= 1995–96 Divizia D =

54th season of the Liga IV, the fourth tier of the Romanian football league

Liga IV
- Season: 1995–96

The 1995–96 Divizia D was the 54th season of the Liga IV, the fourth tier of the Romanian football league system. The champions of each county association play against one from a neighboring county in a promotion play-off played over two legs. A special table was made and teams with the best 16 aggregate results were promoted to the third league.

== Promotion play-off ==
The matches was scheduled to be played on 22 and 26 May 1996.

Team 1	Agg.	Team 2	1st leg	2nd leg	
Acumulatorul București (B)	9–1	(B) Bucur Voința București	6–1	3–0	6–0 Pts.
Electrica Timișoara (TM)	8–3	(HD) Dacia Orăștie	5–2	3–1	6–0 Pts.
Viitorul Oradea (BH)	7–2	(SM) Someșul Satu Mare	4–1	3–1	6–0 Pts.
Arsenal Reșița (CS)	0–5	(MH) Termo Drobeta-Turnu Severin	0–3	0–2	0–6 Pts.
Mecanica Mârșa (SB)	6–2	(MS) Iernut	3–0	3–2	6–0 Pts.
Navol Oltenița (CL)	5–1	(IL) Abatorul Slobozia	2–0	3–1	6–0 Pts.
Foresta Nehoiu (BZ)	0–4	(PH) Metalul Filipeștii de Pădure	0–1	0–3	0–6 Pts.
Minerul Urdari (GJ)	0–3	(VL) Minerul Berbești	0–1	0–2	0–6 Pts.
Metalul Toflea (GL)	9–2	(BR) Dunacor Brăila	7–0	2–2	4–1 Pts.
ASA Rapid Miercurea Ciuc (HR)	1–5	(BV) Romradiatoare Brașov	1–1	0–4	1–4 Pts.
Olt 90 Scornicești (OT)	6–3	(DJ) Petrolul Craiova	4–1	2–2	4–1 Pts.
Hârtia Prundu Bârgăului (BN)	1–4	(MM) Minerul Baia Sprie	0–0	1–4	1–4 Pts.
Spicpo Poroschia (TR)	0–3	(AG) Unirea Pitești	0–0	0–3	1–4 Pts.
Metalul Aiud (AB)	0–3	(AR) CPL Arad	0–0	0–3	1–4 Pts.
Electrica Voința Constanța (CT)	7–2	(TL) Săgeata Stejaru	7–1	0–1	3–3 Pts.
Gloria Zemeș (BC)	3–8	(VS) Steaua Mecanica Huși	3–0	0–8	3–3 Pts.
Minerul Sărmășag (SJ)	2–6	(CJ) Olimpia Gherla	2–0	0–6	3–3 Pts.
Gene Stănești (GR)	6–2	(DB) Electrica Fieni	5–0	1–2	3–3 Pts.
Metalul Botoșani (BT)	5–3	(SV) ASA Câmpulung Moldovenesc	4–1	1–2	3–3 Pts.
Perkö Sânzieni (CV)	2–4	(VN) Siretul Suraia	1–0	1–4	3–3 Pts.
Viitorul 94 Hârlău (IS)	2–3	(NT) Cimentul Bicaz	2–1	0–2	3–3 Pts.

== County leagues ==
- Alba (AB)
- Arad (AR)
- Argeș (AG)
- Bacău (BC)
- Bihor (BH)
- Bistrița-Năsăud (BN)
- Botoșani (BT)
- Brașov (BV)
- Brăila (BR)
- Bucharest (B)
- Buzău (BZ)
- Caraș-Severin (CS)
- Călărași (CL)
- Cluj (CJ)
- Constanța (CT)
- Covasna (CV)
- Dâmbovița (DB)
- Dolj (DJ)
- Galați (GL)
- Giurgiu (GR)
- Gorj (GJ)
- Harghita (HR)
- Hunedoara (HD)
- Ialomița (IL)
- Iași (IS)
- Ilfov (IF)
- Maramureș (MM)
- Mehedinți (MH)
- Mureș (MS)
- Neamț (NT)
- Olt (OT)
- Prahova (PH)
- Satu Mare (SM)
- Sălaj (SJ)
- Sibiu (SB)
- Suceava (SV)
- Teleorman (TR)
- Timiș (TM)
- Tulcea (TL)
- Vaslui (VS)
- Vâlcea (VL)
- Vrancea (VN)

=== Arad County ===
Pos	Team	Pld	W	D	L	GF	GA	GD	Pts	Qualification or relegation
1	CPL Arad (C, Q)	34	25	6	3	92	25	+67	81	Qualification to promotion play-off
2	Indagrara Arad	34	21	2	11	104	39	+65	65	
3	Tricoul Roșu Arad	34	19	1	14	82	50	+32	58	
4	Agroindustrial Curtici	34	17	7	10	80	61	+19	58	
5	Șoimii Lipova	34	17	2	15	71	48	+23	53	
6	Șoimii Romblan Pâncota	34	16	5	13	78	65	+13	53	
7	Ineu	34	16	2	16	56	53	+3	50	
8	Gloria Arad	34	14	7	13	64	54	+10	49	
9	Crișul Chișineu-Criș	34	14	7	13	56	60	−4	49	
10	Vulturii Socodor	34	14	5	15	54	57	−3	47	
11	Victoria Nădlac	34	14	5	15	59	60	−1	47	
12	Petromureș Zădăreni	34	14	4	16	79	64	+15	46	
13	Telecom Arad	34	14	4	16	47	67	−20	46	
14	Dacia Beliu	34	13	6	15	59	82	−23	45	
15	CFR Arad	34	13	6	15	42	48	−6	45	
16	Crișana Sebiș (Note: Crișana Sebiș was spared from relegation due to the promotion of CPL Arad in Divizia C.)	34	13	4	17	61	71	−10	43	Spared from relegation
17	Unirea Șofronea (R)	34	11	3	20	49	86	−37	36	Relegation to Arad County Championship
18	ICRTI Arad (R)	34	2	2	30	15	147	−132	8	Relegation to Arad County Championship

Rules for classification: 1) points; 2) goal difference; 3) number of goals scored.
(C) Champions; (Q) Qualified for the phase indicated; (R) Relegated

=== Bihor County ===
Pos	Team	Pld	W	D	L	GF	GA	GD	Pts	Qualification or relegation
1	Viitorul Oradea (C, Q)	30	28	0	2	122	25	+97	84	Qualification to promotion play-off
2	Voința Oradea	30	19	6	5	60	30	+30	61 (Note: Voința Oradea deducted 2 points.)	
3	Romtrans Oradea	30	18	4	8	54	22	+32	58	
4	INCAST Oradea	30	16	4	10	54	41	+13	52	
5	Oțelul Ștei	30	15	6	9	61	45	+16	51	
6	Crișul Aleșd	30	15	5	10	56	37	+19	50	
7	Minerul Voivozi	30	13	5	12	59	38	+21	44	
8	Blănuri Oradea	30	12	2	16	44	69	−25	38	
9	Bihoreana Petrom Marghita	30	10	5	15	44	48	−4	35	
10	Minerul Șuncuiuș	30	10	4	16	39	52	−13	34	
11	Minerul Vadu Crișului	30	10	4	16	39	75	−36	34	
12	Arovit Valea lui Mihai	30	11	3	16	55	62	−7	33 (Note: Arovit Valea lui Mihai and Crișana Tinca deducted 3 points.)	
13	Bihorul Beiuș	30	11	0	19	39	78	−39	33	
14	Victoria Avram Iancu	30	10	2	18	49	71	−22	32	
15	Petrolul Suplac	30	9	3	18	36	56	−20	30	
16	Crișana Tinca	30	6	1	23	25	87	−62	16	

Rules for classification: 1) Points; 2) Goal difference; 3) Number of goals scored.
(C) Champions; (Q) Qualified for the phase indicated

=== Caraș-Severin County ===
Pos	Team	Pld	W	D	L	GF	GA	GD	Pts	Qualification or relegation
1	Arsenal Reșița (C, Q)	32	25	1	6	117	28	+89	76	Qualification to promotion play-off
2	Metalul Oțelu Roșu	32	23	3	6	79	19	+60	72	
3	Caromet Caransebeș	32	21	4	7	102	29	+73	67	
4	Mundus Caransebeș	32	20	4	8	67	35	+32	64	
5	Minerul Moldova Nouă	32	20	2	10	68	28	+40	62	
6	Minerul Nera Bozovici	32	17	7	8	61	34	+27	58	
7	Muncitorul Reșița	32	15	1	16	61	57	+4	46	
8	Dunărea Moldova Nouă	32	13	2	17	58	59	−1	41	
9	Oravița	32	12	5	15	66	52	+14	41	
10	Olimpia Caransebeș	32	11	6	15	43	52	−9	39	
11	Minerul Cozla	32	11	6	15	42	66	−24	39	
12	Cantara Ciclova Română	32	11	0	21	56	109	−53	33	
13	CFR Caransebeș	32	9	6	17	47	77	−30	33	
14	Metalul Topleț	32	9	6	17	39	61	−22	33	
15	Voința UCMR Energia Poiana Mărului	32	8	6	18	36	79	−43	30	
16	Bistra Glimboca	32	9	2	21	52	105	−53	29	
17	Forest Olimp Zăvoi (R)	32	6	3	23	27	131	−104	21	Relegation to Liga V Caraș-Severin
18	Hercules Băile Herculane (Note: Hercules Băile Herculane withdrew after 26 rounds and all its results were canceled.) (D)	0	0	0	0	0	0	0	0	Withdrew

Rules for classification: 1) Points; 2) Goal difference; 3) Number of goals scored.
(C) Champions; (D) Disqualified; (Q) Qualified for the phase indicated; (R) Relegated

=== Cluj County ===
Pos	Team	Pld	W	D	L	GF	GA	GD	Pts	Qualification or relegation
1	Olimpia Gherla (C, Q)	30	24	3	3	99	10	+89	75	Qualification to promotion play-off
2	Cimentul Turda	30	20	4	6	65	26	+39	64	
3	Dromex Cluj-Napoca	30	17	5	8	53	30	+23	56	
4	Consaur Cluj-Napoca	30	15	7	8	42	20	+22	52	
5	Romhills Cluj-Napoca	30	15	6	9	53	31	+22	51	
6	Clujana Cluj-Napoca	30	14	7	9	45	35	+10	49	
7	Metalurgistul Cluj-Napoca	30	14	6	10	49	43	+6	48	
8	Turdeana Casirom Turda	30	14	4	12	53	48	+5	46	
9	ASA Victoria Someșeni	30	13	5	12	55	35	+20	44	
10	Condor Cluj-Napoca	30	13	5	12	51	41	+10	44	
11	Minerul Ocna Dej	30	13	5	12	33	37	−4	44	
12	Arieșul Câmpia Turzii	30	11	4	15	43	66	−23	37	
13	Minerul Aghireș	30	11	1	18	41	43	−2	34	
14	Electroceramica Turda	30	6	3	21	24	64	−40	21	
15	CFR Cluj-Napoca II	30	5	2	23	25	89	−64	17	
16	Constructorul Chimia Turda	30	0	3	27	17	130	−113	3	

Rules for classification: 1) points; 2) goal difference; 3) number of goals scored.
(C) Champions; (Q) Qualified for the phase indicated

=== Covasna County ===
Pos	Team	Pld	W	D	L	GF	GA	GD	Pts	Qualification or relegation
1	Perkő Sânzieni (C, Q)	28	22	3	3	103	28	+75	69	Qualification to promotion play-off
2	Minerul Baraolt	28	21	2	5	98	22	+76	63 (Note: Minerul Baraolt deducted 2 points.)	
3	Victoria Ozun	28	18	3	7	83	32	+51	57	
4	ICB Malnaș	28	17	3	8	65	29	+36	54	
5	Avântul Catalina	27	17	2	8	63	30	+33	53	
6	Târgu Secuiesc	28	16	4	8	60	33	+27	52	
7	ICB Bixad	28	16	2	10	62	40	+22	50	
8	PRIM Brăduț	28	11	4	13	61	72	−11	37	
9	Stăruința Cernat	28	12	1	15	60	71	−11	37	
10	Nemere Ghelința	28	8	1	19	71	74	−3	25	
11	Spartacus Hăghig	28	7	3	18	56	96	−40	24	
12	Minerul Sfântu Gheorghe	28	6	6	16	31	80	−49	24	
13	Ciucașul Întorsura Buzăului	28	4	9	15	29	85	−56	21	
14	Bradul Zagon	27	6	2	19	27	81	−54	20	
15	Recolta Moacșa (R)	28	5	1	22	32	135	−103	16	Relegation to Liga V Covasna
16	Carpați Covasna (D)	0	0	0	0	0	0	0	0 (Note: Carpați Covasna excluded after 13 rounds and all its results were canceled.)	Excluded

Rules for classification: 1) Points; 2) Goal difference; 3) Number of goals scored.
(C) Champions; (D) Disqualified; (Q) Qualified for the phase indicated; (R) Relegated

=== Dolj County ===
Pos	Team	Pld	W	D	L	GF	GA	GD	Pts	Qualification or relegation
1	Petrolul Craiova (C, Q)	34	26	7	1	105	16	+89	85	Qualification to promotion play-off
2	Elpreco Craiova	34	26	4	4	95	17	+78	82	
3	Morărit-Panificație Craiova	33	20	6	7	58	26	+32	66	
4	Autobuzul Craiova	34	18	10	6	68	24	+44	64	
5	CFR Craiova	34	18	7	9	56	30	+26	61	
6	Armata Craiova	34	17	8	9	56	30	+26	59	
7	Bere Craiova	34	14	11	9	49	28	+21	53	
8	Tractorul Craiova	34	15	5	14	68	38	+30	50	
9	Gaz Metan Ghercești	34	15	5	14	56	45	+11	50	
10	Progresul Băilești	34	14	4	16	61	61	0	46	
11	Victoria Plenița	34	13	4	17	48	54	−6	43	
12	Dunărea Calafat	34	12	3	19	57	68	−11	39	
13	Unirea Tricolor Dăbuleni	34	10	5	19	54	80	−26	35	
14	Victoria Leu	33	10	2	21	38	92	−54	32	
15	Fulgerul Maglavit	34	9	5	20	37	92	−55	32	
16	Tractorul Bechet (R)	34	8	2	24	46	93	−47	26	Relegation to Dolj County Championship
17	Recolta Măceșu de Jos (R)	34	7	3	24	29	128	−99	24	Relegation to Dolj County Championship
18	Energo TMC Filiași (R)	34	6	3	25	36	94	−58	21	Relegation to Dolj County Championship

Rules for classification: 1) Points; 2) Goal difference; 3) Number of goals scored.
(C) Champions; (Q) Qualified for the phase indicated; (R) Relegated

=== Harghita County ===
Pos	Team	Pld	W	D	L	GF	GA	GD	Pts	Qualification or relegation
1	ASA Rapid Miercurea Ciuc (C, Q)	24	22	1	1	103	18	+85	67	Qualification to promotion play-off
2	Vulturul Carpatin Gheorgheni	24	19	2	3	87	16	+71	59	
3	Complexul Gălăuțaș	24	15	2	7	57	32	+25	47	
4	Unirea Cristuru Secuiesc	24	15	1	8	72	39	+33	46	
5	Minerul Bălan	24	14	2	8	68	33	+35	44	
6	Aragonit Corund	24	13	1	10	43	37	+6	40	
7	Harghita Odorheiu Secuiesc	24	9	2	13	50	55	−5	29	
8	Apemin Borsec	24	9	2	13	40	69	−29	29	
9	Amilemn Sânsimion	24	9	2	13	41	75	−34	29	
10	CSȘ Miercurea Ciuc	24	8	3	13	47	78	−31	27	
11	Unirea Lueta	24	7	0	17	50	65	−15	21	
12	Viitorul Gheorgheni	24	3	2	19	21	73	−52	11	
13	Piliske Tușnad Sat	24	2	2	20	25	114	−89	8	
14	Unirea Hodoșa (Note: Unirea Hodoșa, FPL Apemin Sâncrăieni and Meteorul Sânmartin withdrew after 20 rounds and all their results were canceled.) (D)	0	0	0	0	0	0	0	0	Withdrew
15	FPL Apemin Sâncrăieni (D)	0	0	0	0	0	0	0	0	Withdrew
16	Meteorul Sânmartin (D)	0	0	0	0	0	0	0	0	Withdrew

Rules for classification: 1) Points; 2) Goal difference; 3) Number of goals scored.
(C) Champions; (D) Disqualified; (Q) Qualified for the phase indicated

=== Hunedoara County ===
Pos	Team	Pld	W	D	L	GF	GA	GD	Pts	Qualification or relegation
1	Dacia Orăștie (C, Q)	28	21	1	6	82	37	+45	64	Qualification to promotion play-off
2	Minerul Știința Vulcan	28	19	3	6	60	26	+34	60	
3	Favior Orăștie	28	14	6	8	43	27	+16	48	
4	Victoria 90 Călan	28	13	6	9	43	24	+19	45	
5	Minerul Bărbăteni	28	13	6	9	47	29	+18	45	
6	Minerul Aninoasa	28	14	3	11	42	38	+4	45	
7	Aurul Brad	28	13	5	10	58	38	+20	44	
8	Minerul Ghelari	28	12	2	14	41	43	−2	38	
9	Minerul Teliuc	28	10	7	11	45	29	+16	37	
10	Constructorul Hunedoara	28	12	1	15	49	44	+5	37	
11	Jiul Petrila	28	11	3	14	53	49	+4	36	
12	Metalul Crișcior	28	11	3	14	33	50	−17	36	
13	Minerul Livezeni	28	8	5	15	26	52	−26	29	
14	CFR Simeria	28	7	4	17	30	79	−49	25	
15	EGCL Călan	28	4	1	23	26	109	−83	13	
16	Haber Hațeg (Note: Haber Hațeg was excluded after two non show-ups.) (D)	0	0	0	0	0	0	0	0	Excluded

Rules for classification: 1) points; 2) goal difference; 3) number of goals scored.
(C) Champions; (D) Disqualified; (Q) Qualified for the phase indicated

=== Mureș County ===
Pos	Team	Pld	W	D	L	GF	GA	GD	Pts	Qualification or relegation
1	Iernut (C, Q)	28	20	6	2	85	36	+49	66	Qualification to promotion play-off
2	Reghin	28	19	5	4	87	20	+67	62	
3	Electromureș Târgu Mureș	28	19	5	4	55	21	+34	62	
4	Unirea Ungheni	28	15	2	11	52	43	+9	47	
5	Mureșul Romvelo Luduș	28	11	7	10	43	35	+8	40	
6	Berea Reghin	28	11	4	13	59	51	+8	37	
7	Cora Trade Sâncrai	28	10	6	12	43	46	−3	36	
8	Gaz Metan Târgu Mureș	28	9	7	12	51	41	+10	34	
9	Sere Iernut	28	10	4	14	37	57	−20	34	
10	Cetatea ASA Sighișoara	28	9	5	14	29	44	−15	32	
11	Victoria Sărățeni	28	9	5	14	34	56	−22	32	
12	Foresta Sovata	28	9	4	15	36	58	−22	31	
13	Venus Solovăstru	28	7	6	15	41	68	−27	27	
14	Piscicola Zau	28	8	3	17	51	97	−46	27	
15	Voința Miercurea Nirajului	28	7	5	16	33	63	−30	26	
16	Matricon Târgu Mureș (Note: Matricon Târgu Mureș withdrew from championship and all its results were canceled.) (D)	0	0	0	0	0	0	0	0	Withdrew

Rules for classification: 1) points; 2) goal difference; 3) number of goals scored.
(C) Champions; (D) Disqualified; (Q) Qualified for the phase indicated

=== Neamț County ===
Pos	Team	Pld	W	D	L	GF	GA	GD	Pts	Qualification or relegation
1	Cimentul Bicaz (C, Q)	26	26	0	0	133	14	+119	78	Qualification to promotion play-off
2	Laminorul Roman	26	19	3	4	87	24	+63	60	
3	Juventus Piatra Neamț	26	17	2	7	85	26	+59	53	
4	Bradul Roznov	26	15	2	9	66	58	+8	47	
5	Viitorul AGET Podoleni	26	14	3	9	68	46	+22	45	
6	Azochim Săvinești	26	14	2	10	75	47	+28	44	
7	Progresul Doljești	26	13	2	11	62	54	+8	41	
8	Danubiana Roman	26	12	4	10	66	46	+20	40	
9	Energia Poiana Teiului	26	13	0	13	60	53	+7	39	
10	IM Piatra Neamț	26	10	2	14	56	88	−32	32	
11	Șoimii Piatra Șoimului	26	5	3	18	24	86	−62	18	
12	Unirea Dumbrava Roșie	26	5	1	20	23	91	−68	16	
13	Voința Ion Creangă	26	5	1	20	17	85	−68	16	
14	Flacăra Budești	26	1	1	24	14	118	−104	4	

Rules for classification: 1) Points; 2) Goal difference; 3) Number of goals scored.
(C) Champions; (Q) Qualified for the phase indicated

=== Sălaj County ===
Pos	Team	Pld	W	D	L	GF	GA	GD	Pts	Qualification or relegation (Note: After 22 matches the first 2 teams qualified for the play-offs, which was played in a double round-robin tournament.)
1	Minerul Sarmășag (C, Q)	24	19	2	3	114	17	+97	59	Qualification to promotion play-off
2	Silvania Cehu Silvaniei	24	15	4	5	77	35	+42	49	
3	Someșul Jibou	22	14	3	5	44	31	+13	45	
4	Armătura Zalău II (Note: Armătura Zalău II replaced Mobila Șimleu Silvaniei in the second part of the season and took over all its results.)	22	14	1	7	78	40	+38	43	
5	Chimia Zalău	22	12	5	5	50	27	+23	41	
6	Tractorul Nușfalău	22	12	4	6	49	34	+15	40	
7	Minerul Ip	22	8	5	9	34	34	0	29	
8	Inter Gârcei	22	7	3	12	29	50	−21	24	
9	Spartac Crasna	22	6	3	13	32	58	−26	21	
10	Laminorul Zalău	22	5	0	17	22	73	−51	15	
11	Minerul Hida	22	4	1	17	27	87	−60	13	
12	Progresul Bălan	22	3	1	18	30	99	−69	10	

Rules for classification: 1) points; 2) goal difference; 3) number of goals scored.
(C) Champions; (Q) Qualified for the phase indicated

=== Sibiu County ===
Pos	Team	Pld	W	D	L	GF	GA	GD	Pts	Qualification or relegation
1	Mecanica Mârșa (C, Q)	30	25	3	2	104	14	+90	78	Qualification to promotion play-off
2	CSU Mecanica Sembraz Sibiu	30	21	5	4	81	35	+46	68	
3	Record Mediaș	30	20	7	3	98	28	+70	67	
4	Sparta Mediaș	30	18	8	4	73	24	+49	62	
5	Geromed Mediaș	30	19	4	7	75	31	+44	61	
6	Vitrometan Mediaș	30	14	5	11	63	55	+8	47	
7	Textila Cisnădie	30	13	7	10	57	36	+21	46	
8	CFR Retezat Sibiu	30	10	9	11	39	40	−1	39	
9	Cedonia 95 Sibiu	30	11	4	15	47	51	−4	37	
10	Unirea Ocna Sibiului	30	9	6	15	44	79	−35	33	
11	Construcții Sibiu	30	8	6	16	31	63	−32	30	
12	Viitorul Bazna	30	8	5	17	36	77	−41	29	
13	IMIX Agnita	30	7	6	17	52	62	−10	27	
14	Romanofir Tălmaciu	30	6	8	16	36	66	−30	26	
15	Sticla Avrig (Note: Sticla Avrig was spared from relegation due to the promotion of Mecanica Mârșa in Divizia C.)	30	5	3	22	32	114	−82	18	Spared from relegation
16	Silva Săliște (R)	30	2	3	25	41	129	−88	9	Relegation to Sibiu County Championship

Rules for classification: 1) Points; 2) Head-to-head points; 3) Head-to-head goal difference; 4) Head-to-head goals scored; 5) Head-to-head away goals scored; 6) Goal difference; 7) Goals scored.
(C) Champions; (Q) Qualified for the phase indicated; (R) Relegated

=== Timiș County ===
Pos	Team	Pld	W	D	L	GF	GA	GD	Pts	Qualification or relegation
1	Electrica Timișoara (C, Q)	34	24	4	6	118	47	+71	76	Qualification to promotion play-off
2	Recaș	34	22	5	7	72	29	+43	71	
3	Bancom Comloșu Mare	34	19	8	7	60	42	+18	65	
4	Obilici Sânmartinu Sârbesc	34	19	6	9	68	41	+27	63	
5	Șoimii Textila Timișoara	34	17	5	12	60	45	+15	56	
6	Unirea Peciu Nou	34	17	3	14	66	54	+12	54	
7	Modern Timișoara	34	15	8	11	66	57	+9	53	
8	Timișul Șag	34	15	6	13	51	46	+5	51	
9	Laminorul Nădrag	34	15	4	15	67	63	+4	49	
10	Unirea Sânnicolau Mare	34	14	5	15	63	63	0	47	
11	Auto FZB Timișoara	34	13	7	14	40	51	−11	46	
12	ELBA Timișoara	34	14	2	18	63	75	−12	44	
13	Timpuri Noi Giarmata	34	13	4	17	54	57	−3	43	
14	Jimbolia	34	13	3	18	69	89	−20	42	
15	Tehnolemn Timișoara	34	12	5	17	54	71	−17	41 (Note: Tehnolemn are ahead of Tomnatic on Head-to-head away goals scored: Tomnatic 2–2 Tehnolemn, Tehnolemn 1–1 Tomnatic.)	
16	Unirea Tomnatic (R)	34	11	8	15	54	62	−8	41	Relegation to Timiș County Championship
17	Azur Timișoara (R)	34	5	5	24	38	71	−33	20	Relegation to Timiș County Championship
18	Unirea Ghilad (R)	34	3	2	29	38	143	−105	11	Relegation to Timiș County Championship

Rules for classification: 1) points; 2) goal difference; 3) number of goals scored.
(C) Champions; (Q) Qualified for the phase indicated; (R) Relegated

== See also ==
- 1995–96 Divizia A
- 1995–96 Divizia B
