= 1996–97 Divizia D =

55th season of the Liga IV, the fourth tier of the Romanian football league

Liga IV
- Season: 1996–97

The 1996–97 Divizia D was the 55th season of the Liga IV, the fourth tier of the Romanian football league system. The champions of each county association play against one from a neighboring county in a promotion play-off match played on a neutral venue. A special table was made and teams with the best 16 results were promoted to the third league.

== County leagues ==
- Alba (AB)
- Arad (AR)
- Argeș (AG)
- Bacău (BC)
- Bihor (BH)
- Bistrița-Năsăud (BN)
- Botoșani (BT)
- Brașov (BV)
- Brăila (BR)
- Bucharest (B)
- Buzău (BZ)
- Caraș-Severin (CS)
- Călărași (CL)
- Cluj (CJ)
- Constanța (CT)
- Covasna (CV)
- Dâmbovița (DB)
- Dolj (DJ)
- Galați (GL)
- Giurgiu (GR)
- Gorj (GJ)
- Harghita (HR)
- Hunedoara (HD)
- Ialomița (IL)
- Iași (IS)
- Ilfov (IF)
- Maramureș (MM)
- Mehedinți (MH)
- Mureș (MS)
- Neamț (NT)
- Olt (OT)
- Prahova (PH)
- Satu Mare (SM)
- Sălaj (SJ)
- Sibiu (SB)
- Suceava (SV)
- Teleorman (TR)
- Timiș (TM)
- Tulcea (TL)
- Vaslui (VS)
- Vâlcea (VL)
- Vrancea (VN)

== Promotion play-off ==
The matches was played on 11 June 1997.

Team 1	Score	Team 2
Metalul Botoșani (BT)	2–8	(NT) Laminorul Roman
Progresul Șomcuta Mare (MM)	0–4	(SM) Victoria Carei
Rulmentul Bârlad (VS)	5–0	(VN) Siretul Suraia
Fortus Iași (IS)	2–5	(SV) Bucovina Rădăuți
Antilosport București (B)	1–4	(B) Inter Gaz Glin
Olimpia Gherla (CJ)	3–0	(SJ) Minerul Sărmășag
Minerul Urdari (GJ)	1–3	(OT) Alprom Slatina
AC Recaș (TM)	0–2	(BH) Crișul Aleșd
Forestierul Stâlpeni (AG)	0–2	(TR) Rulmentul Alexandria
Severnav Drobeta-Turnu Severin (MH)	2–0	(VL) Flacăra Horezu
Aurora Bacău (BC)	0–2	(HR) ASA Rapid Miercurea Ciuc
Romgal Romanu (BR)	3–4	(GL) Victoria IUG Galați
Indagrara Arad (AR)	2–3	(CS) CFR Caransebeș
Minerul Roșia Montană (AB)	1–2	(BN) Hârtia Prundu Bârgăului
Minerul Baraolt (CV)	1–2	(PH) Minerul Filipeștii de Pădure
Constructorul Craiova (DJ)	1–0	(SB) Sparta Mediaș
FC Reghin (MS)	0–1	(HD) Aurul Brad
Ceres Ciocănești (CL)	1–2	(TL) Săgeata Stejaru
AS Neptun (CT)	0–0 (5–4 p)	(IL) Agricultorul Balaciu
Petrolul Steaua Târgoviște (DB)	1–0	(GR) Petrolul Roata de Jos
Textila Prejmer (BV)	1–2 (a.e.t.)	(BZ) Olimpia Râmnicu Sărat

== Leagues standings ==
=== Arad County ===
Pos	Team	Pld	W	D	L	GF	GA	GD	Pts	Qualification or relegation
1	Indagrara Arad (C, Q)	36	27	3	6	123	39	+84	84	Qualification to promotion play-off
2	AS Vladimirescu	36	26	5	5	102	32	+70	83	
3	Tricoul Roșu Arad	36	21	6	9	101	44	+57	69	
4	Șoimii Lipova	36	20	6	10	99	50	+49	66	
5	Gloria Arad	36	16	6	14	70	55	+15	54	
6	Avântul Târnova	36	17	3	16	53	62	−9	54	
7	FC Ineu	36	16	5	15	57	74	−17	53	
8	Romvest Șofronea	36	16	3	17	80	82	−2	51	
9	Gloria Cermei	36	14	8	14	71	77	−6	50	
10	Șoimii Romblan Pâncota	36	14	8	14	59	66	−7	50	
11	Agroindustrial Curtici	36	14	7	15	61	74	−13	49	
12	Victoria Nădlac	36	13	7	16	55	72	−17	46	
13	Crișul Chișineu-Criș	36	14	1	21	82	89	−7	43	
14	Petromureș Zădăreni	36	11	9	16	69	91	−22	42	
15	Crișana Sebiș	36	12	3	21	57	79	−22	39	
16	Stăruința Dorobanți (R)	36	12	3	21	54	89	−35	39	
17	Vulturii Socodor (R)	36	11	6	19	57	99	−42	39	Relegation to Arad County Championship
18	CFR Șagu (R)	36	10	8	18	66	83	−17	38	Relegation to Arad County Championship
19	Victoria Ceasuri (R)	36	7	5	24	48	107	−59	26	Relegation to Arad County Championship
20	Dacia Beliu (Note: Dacia Beliu withdrew during the season and all its results were canceled.) (R)	0	0	0	0	0	0	0	0	Withdrew

Rules for classification: 1) points; 2) goal difference; 3) number of goals scored.
(C) Champions; (Q) Qualified for the phase indicated; (R) Relegated

=== Bihor County ===
Pos	Team	Pld	W	D	L	GF	GA	GD	Pts	Qualification or relegation
1	Crișul Aleșd (C, Q)	26	22	3	1	64	11	+53	69	Qualification to promotion play-off
2	Romtrans Oradea	26	14	7	5	48	25	+23	49	
3	Minerul Șuncuiuș	26	15	1	10	52	33	+19	46	
4	Olimpia Salonta	26	13	6	7	65	35	+30	45	
5	Blănuri Oradea	26	13	5	8	62	29	+33	44	
6	Oțelul Ștei	26	13	4	9	60	34	+26	43	
7	Minerul Voivozi	26	12	2	12	48	33	+15	38	
8	INCAST Oradea	26	10	8	8	36	26	+10	38	
9	Minerul Vadu Crișului	26	9	3	14	35	69	−34	30	
10	Petrolul Suplac	26	8	3	15	28	43	−15	27	
11	Victoria Avram Iancu	26	9	2	15	42	65	−23	26 (Note: Victoria Avram Iancu deducted 3 points.)	
12	Petrom Marghita	26	5	6	15	25	77	−52	21	
13	Bihorul Beiuș	26	6	2	18	32	74	−42	20	
14	Arovit Valea lui Mihai	26	6	2	18	32	75	−43	20	

Rules for classification: 1) Points; 2) Goal difference; 3) Number of goals scored.
(C) Champions; (Q) Qualified for the phase indicated

=== Caraș-Severin County ===
Pos	Team	Pld	W	D	L	GF	GA	GD	Pts	Qualification or relegation
1	CFR Caransebeș (C, Q)	30	22	5	3	77	17	+60	71	Qualification to promotion play-off
2	Metalul Oțelu Roșu	30	21	5	4	74	22	+52	68	
3	Caromet Caransebeș	30	19	1	10	80	24	+56	58	
4	Oravița	30	18	4	8	62	23	+39	58	
5	Minerul Moldova Nouă	30	17	6	7	62	29	+33	57	
6	Arsenal Reșița	30	14	7	9	44	30	+14	49	
7	Muncitorul Reșița	30	14	3	13	46	41	+5	45	
8	Mundus Caransebeș	30	12	6	12	56	34	+22	42	
9	Dunărea Moldova Nouă	30	11	4	15	43	54	−11	37	
10	Minerul Ocna de Fier	30	11	1	18	43	73	−30	34	
11	Minerul Nera Bozovici	30	9	5	16	35	55	−20	32	
12	Cantara Ciclova Română	30	9	3	18	23	73	−50	30	
13	Metropol Tirol	30	10	0	20	40	97	−57	30	
14	Minerul Cozla	30	8	4	18	34	65	−31	28	
15	Forest Olimp Zăvoi	30	7	4	19	23	59	−36	25	
16	Metalul Topleț	30	7	4	19	23	69	−46	25	
17	Energia Poiana Mărului (Note: Bistra Glimboca and Energia Poiana Mărului withdrew after 29 rounds and all their results were canceled.) (D)	0	0	0	0	0	0	0	0	Withdrew
18	Bistra Glimboca (D)	0	0	0	0	0	0	0	0	Withdrew

Rules for classification: 1) Points; 2) Goal difference; 3) Number of goals scored.
(C) Champions; (D) Disqualified; (Q) Qualified for the phase indicated

=== Cluj County ===
Pos	Team	Pld	W	D	L	GF	GA	GD	Pts	Qualification or relegation
1	Olimpia Gherla (C, Q)	30	25	4	1	111	23	+88	77 (Note: Olimpia Gherla deducted 2 points.)	Qualification to promotion play-off
2	Clujana Cluj-Napoca	30	21	3	6	70	28	+42	66	
3	Turdeana Casirom Turda	30	20	3	7	67	32	+35	63	
4	Romhills Cluj-Napoca	30	18	6	6	49	27	+22	60	
5	Cimentul Turda	30	16	8	6	70	37	+33	56	
6	Minerul Ocna Dej	30	15	5	10	57	32	+25	50	
7	Metalurgistul Cluj-Napoca	30	13	6	11	54	41	+13	45	
8	Victoria Someșeni	30	12	7	11	43	46	−3	43	
9	Minerul Iara	30	13	3	14	43	46	−3	42	
10	Consaur Cluj-Napoca	30	14	3	13	53	42	+11	41 (Note: Consaur Cluj-Napoca deducted 4 points.)	
11	Dromex Cluj-Napoca	30	9	8	13	36	40	−4	35	
12	Minerul Aghireș	30	7	8	15	37	62	−25	29	
13	Arieșul Câmpia Turzii	30	8	5	17	51	69	−18	26 (Note: Arieșul Câmpia Turzii deducted 3 points.)	
14	Electroceramica Turda	30	5	5	20	33	51	−18	20	
15	Prodfuraj Iclod	30	3	2	25	27	145	−118	11	
16	CFR Cluj-Napoca II	30	2	2	26	22	102	−80	8	

Rules for classification: 1) points; 2) goal difference; 3) number of goals scored.
(C) Champions; (Q) Qualified for the phase indicated

=== Covasna County ===
Pos	Team	Pld	W	D	L	GF	GA	GD	Pts	Qualification or relegation
1	Minerul Baraolt (C, Q)	26	22	2	2	78	16	+62	68	Qualification to promotion play-off
2	Fortyogó Târgu Secuiesc	26	21	2	3	104	13	+91	65	
3	Victoria Ozun	26	16	4	6	78	27	+51	52	
4	Avântul Catalina	26	15	3	8	70	27	+43	48	
5	ICB Malnaș	26	15	2	9	61	39	+22	47	
6	Perkő Sânzieni	26	14	4	8	58	49	+9	44 (Note: Perkő Sânzieni deducted 3 points.)	
7	Nemere Ghelința	26	11	3	12	78	61	+17	36	
8	ICB Bixad	26	10	2	14	49	52	−3	32	
9	PRIM Brăduț	26	11	4	11	45	58	−13	31 (Note: PRIM Brăduț, Stăruința Cernat and Bradul Zagon deducted 6 points.)	
10	Stăruința Cernat	26	8	3	15	46	66	−20	21	
11	Târgu Secuiesc	26	6	3	17	37	112	−75	21	
12	Harghita Aita Mare	26	6	2	18	30	80	−50	20	
13	Bradul Zagon	26	4	2	20	20	89	−69	8	
14	Minerul Sfântu Gheorghe (R)	26	4	4	18	28	83	−55	1 (Note: Minerul Sfântu Gheorghe deducted 15 points.)	Relegation to Liga V Covasna
15	Bradul Comandău (D)	0	0	0	0	0	0	0	0 (Note: Bradul Comandău and Spartacus Hăghig withdrew during the season and all their results were canceled.)	Withdrew
16	Spartacus Hăghig (D)	0	0	0	0	0	0	0	0	Withdrew

Rules for classification: 1) Points; 2) Goal difference; 3) Number of goals scored.
(C) Champions; (D) Disqualified; (Q) Qualified for the phase indicated; (R) Relegated

=== Dolj County ===
Pos	Team	Pld	W	D	L	GF	GA	GD	Pts	Qualification or relegation
1	Constructorul Craiova (C, Q)	32	27	2	3	112	19	+93	83	Qualification to promotion play-off
2	Betonul Craiova	32	22	7	3	63	20	+43	73	
3	Bere Craiova	32	23	3	6	67	28	+39	72	
4	Dunărea Calafat	32	18	2	12	67	42	+25	56	
5	Armata Craiova	32	14	9	9	57	30	+27	51	
6	Morărit-Panificație Craiova	32	14	9	9	28	23	+5	51	
7	Gaz Metan Ghercești	32	13	6	13	54	35	+19	45	
8	Autobuzul Craiova	32	12	9	11	52	53	−1	45	
9	Progresul Băilești	32	12	6	14	50	39	+11	42	
10	CFR Craiova	32	10	9	13	37	48	−11	39	
11	Chimia Craiova	32	10	7	15	47	59	−12	37	
12	Petrolul Craiova	32	10	6	16	33	47	−14	36	
13	Tractorul Craiova	32	8	11	13	23	35	−12	35	
14	Victoria Plenița	32	6	10	16	31	61	−30	28	
15	Unirea Tricolor Dăbuleni (R)	32	8	3	21	36	83	−47	24 (Note: Unirea Tricolor Dăbuleni deducted 3 points.)	Qualification to relegation play-off
16	Fulgerul Maglavit (R)	32	5	4	23	26	107	−81	17 (Note: Fulgerul Maglavit deducted 2 points.)	Qualification to relegation play-off
17	Voința Belcin (R)	32	6	5	21	36	93	−57	16 (Note: Voința Belcin deducted 7 points.)	Relegation to Dolj County Championship
18	Victoria Leu (Note: Victoria Leu withdrew during the season and all its results were canceled.) (D)	0	0	0	0	0	0	0	0	Withdrew

Rules for classification: 1) Points; 2) Goal difference; 3) Number of goals scored.
(C) Champions; (D) Disqualified; (Q) Qualified for the phase indicated; (R) Relegated
Notes:

Relegation play-off

The 15th and 16th-placed teams of the Divizia D faces the 2nd placed teams from the two series of Dolj County Championship.
The matches was played on 7 June 1997 at Armata Ground in Craiova and Amărăștii de Jos.

Team 1	Score	Team 2
Mecanica Filiași	5–4	Fulgerul Maglavit
Tractorul Bechet	3–0	Unirea Tricolor Dăbuleni

=== Giurgiu County ===
Pos	Team	Pld	W	D	L	GF	GA	GD	Pts	Qualification or relegation
1	Petrolul Roata de Jos (C, Q)	22	18	2	2	98	14	+84	56	Qualification to promotion play-off
2	Unirea Bolintin Vale	22	18	0	4	65	19	+46	54	
3	Verachim Giurgiu	22	17	1	4	72	21	+51	52	
4	Voința Slobozia	22	11	4	7	63	39	+24	37	
5	Luceafărul Trestieni	22	10	4	8	56	56	0	34	
6	Unirea Joița	22	9	4	9	48	59	−11	31	
7	Dunacon Giurgiu	22	8	4	10	40	63	−23	28	
8	Piscicola Hobaia	22	8	0	14	46	63	−17	24	
9	Spicul Izvoru	22	7	2	13	42	63	−21	23	
10	Speranța Săbăreni	22	6	4	12	29	51	−22	22	
11	Nest Clejani	22	3	2	17	25	84	−59	11	
12	Avântul Cartojani	22	3	1	18	29	81	−52	10	

Rules for classification: 1) Points; 2) Goal difference; 3) Number of goals scored.
(C) Champions; (Q) Qualified for the phase indicated

=== Harghita County ===
Pos	Team	Pld	W	D	L	GF	GA	GD	Pts	Qualification or relegation
1	ASA Rapid Miercurea Ciuc (C, Q)	22	18	3	1	84	16	+68	57	Qualification to promotion play-off
2	Apemin Borsec	21	16	1	4	55	15	+40	49	
3	Minerul Bălan	21	12	5	4	64	20	+44	41	
4	Unirea Cristuru Secuiesc	21	12	3	6	49	32	+17	39	
5	Complexul Gălăuțaș	21	12	0	9	49	21	+28	36	
6	Amilemn Sânsimion	20	9	2	9	27	43	−16	29	
7	Viitorul Gheorgheni	21	8	4	9	29	39	−10	28	
8	Meteorul Sânmartin	21	8	3	10	41	49	−8	27	
9	Metalul Vlăhița	21	7	2	12	34	53	−19	23	
10	Unirea Lueta	21	4	3	14	22	47	−25	15	
11	Piliske Tușnad Sat	22	4	3	15	20	70	−50	15	
12	CSȘ Miercurea Ciuc	22	2	1	19	14	83	−69	7	

Rules for classification: 1) points; 2) goal difference; 3) number of goals scored.
(C) Champions; (Q) Qualified for the phase indicated

=== Hunedoara County ===
Pos	Team	Pld	W	D	L	GF	GA	GD	Pts	Qualification or relegation
1	Aurul Brad (C, Q)	28	19	7	2	72	19	+53	64	Qualification to promotion play-off
2	Favior Orăștie	28	14	7	7	46	31	+15	49	
3	Minerul Teliuc	28	14	5	9	31	24	+7	47	
4	Minerul Știința Vulcan	28	14	3	11	55	46	+9	45	
5	Victoria 90 Călan	28	13	5	10	46	27	+19	44	
6	Minerul Ghelari	28	13	5	10	43	32	+11	44	
7	Constructorul Hunedoara	28	13	5	10	33	27	+6	44	
8	CFR Marmosim Simeria	28	13	4	11	39	39	0	43	
9	Minerul Aninoasa	28	10	8	10	66	33	+33	38	
10	Minerul Bărbăteni	28	11	3	14	56	50	+6	36	
11	Dacia Orăștie	28	9	8	11	50	47	+3	35	
12	Metalul Crișcior	28	9	6	13	34	51	−17	33	
13	Casino Ilia	28	8	5	15	32	53	−21	29	
14	Minerul Livezeni	28	7	6	15	33	54	−21	27	
15	Utilajul Petroșani	28	2	6	20	19	82	−63	12	

Rules for classification: 1) points; 2) goal difference; 3) number of goals scored.
(C) Champions; (Q) Qualified for the phase indicated

=== Mureș County ===
Pos	Team	Pld	W	D	L	GF	GA	GD	Pts	Qualification or relegation
1	FC Reghin (C, Q)	24	20	4	0	87	15	+72	64	Qualification to promotion play-off
2	Mureșul Romvelo Luduș	24	18	2	4	52	19	+33	53 (Note: Mureșul Romvelo Luduș and Olimpia Râciu deducted 3 points.)	
3	Electromureș Târgu Mureș	24	12	5	7	60	24	+36	41	
4	Gaz Metan Târgu Mureș	24	13	2	9	59	38	+21	41	
5	FC Iernut	24	11	2	11	48	41	+7	35	
6	Avântul Miheșu de Câmpie	24	10	5	9	39	35	+4	35	
7	Unirea Ungheni	24	9	5	10	45	41	+4	32	
8	Cetatea ASA Sighișoara	24	8	8	8	36	36	0	32	
9	Constructorul Reghin	24	9	4	11	50	63	−13	31	
10	Foresta Sovata	24	9	4	11	29	43	−14	31	
11	Victoria Sărățeni	24	6	2	16	35	63	−28	20	
12	Cetatea Brâncovenești	24	4	4	16	25	94	−69	16	
13	Olimpia Râciu	24	3	1	20	25	78	−53	7	
14	Sere Iernut (Note: Sere Iernut withdrew after 3 rounds and all its results were canceled.) (D)	0	0	0	0	0	0	0	0	Withdrew
15	Cora Trade Sâncrai (Note: Cora Trade Sâncrai and Piscicola Zau withdrew during the season and all their results were canceled.) (D)	0	0	0	0	0	0	0	0	Withdrew
16	Piscicola Zau (D)	0	0	0	0	0	0	0	0	Withdrew

Rules for classification: 1) points; 2) goal difference; 3) number of goals scored.
(C) Champions; (D) Disqualified; (Q) Qualified for the phase indicated

=== Neamț County ===
Pos	Team	Pld	W	D	L	GF	GA	GD	Pts	Qualification or relegation
1	Laminorul Roman (C, Q)	36	34	2	0	208	10	+198	104	Qualification to promotion play-off
2	Cimentul Bicaz	36	27	4	5	113	32	+81	85	
3	Bradul Roznov	36	18	8	10	84	53	+31	62	
4	Juventus Piatra Neamț	36	17	6	13	107	88	+19	57	
5	Azochim Săvinești	36	16	3	17	90	89	+1	51	
6	Danubiana Roman	36	12	6	18	62	94	−32	42	
7	Progresul Doljești	36	12	3	21	62	134	−72	39	
8	Energia Poiana Teiului	36	12	0	24	56	95	−39	36	
9	Viitorul AGET Podoleni	36	8	1	27	44	120	−76	25	
10	IM Piatra Neamț	36	7	1	28	55	166	−111	22	

Rules for classification: 1) Points; 2) Goal difference; 3) Number of goals scored.
(C) Champions; (Q) Qualified for the phase indicated

=== Sălaj County ===
Pos	Team	Pld	W	D	L	GF	GA	GD	Pts	Qualification or relegation
1	Minerul Sărmășag (C, Q)	24	22	2	0	117	16	+101	68	Qualification to promotion play-off
2	Silvania Cehu Silvaniei	24	20	2	2	99	18	+81	62	
3	Chimia Zalău	24	17	3	4	76	29	+47	54	
4	Tractorul Nușfalău	24	13	3	8	56	36	+20	42	
5	Minerul Ip	24	12	3	9	47	41	+6	38 (Note: Minerul Ip deducted 1 point.)	
6	Rapid Jibou	24	12	1	11	45	51	−6	37	
7	Cibela Crișeni	24	10	3	11	39	53	−14	33	
8	Minerul Hida	24	8	3	13	35	62	−27	27	
9	Gloria Bobota	24	5	5	14	47	63	−16	20	
10	Spartac Crasna	24	5	5	14	36	70	−34	20	
11	Rapid Almaș	24	6	1	17	33	72	−39	15 (Note: Rapid Almaș deducted 4 points.)	
12	Minerul Chieșd	24	4	1	19	21	98	−77	13	
13	Someșul Someș-Odorhei	24	3	1	20	21	68	−47	10	
14	Progresul Bălan (Note: Progresul Bălan withdrew during the season and all its results were canceled.) (D)	0	0	0	0	0	0	0	0	Withdrew

Rules for classification: 1) points; 2) goal difference; 3) number of goals scored.
(C) Champions; (D) Disqualified; (Q) Qualified for the phase indicated

=== Sibiu County ===
Pos	Team	Pld	W	D	L	GF	GA	GD	Pts	Qualification or relegation
1	Sparta Mediaș (C, Q)	30	23	3	4	95	18	+77	72	Qualification to promotion play-off
2	CFR Retezat PIM Sibiu	30	21	2	7	82	26	+56	65	
3	COMESO Șeica Mare	30	19	4	7	72	29	+43	61	
4	Vitrometan Mediaș	30	19	4	7	70	44	+26	61	
5	Geromed Mediaș	30	18	4	8	66	33	+33	58	
6	Record Mediaș	30	16	7	7	97	30	+67	55	
7	Textila Cisnădie	30	16	3	11	61	45	+16	51	
8	Universitatea Mecasem Sibiu	30	15	2	13	71	47	+24	47	
9	Romanofir Tălmaciu	30	12	5	13	62	48	+14	41	
10	Sticla Avrig	30	12	4	14	43	70	−27	40	
11	Construcții Sibiu	30	11	2	17	40	73	−33	35	
12	Unirea Ocna Sibiului	30	8	6	16	41	57	−16	30	
13	Agnita	30	9	1	20	53	80	−27	28	
14	Viitorul Bazna	30	7	5	18	53	92	−39	26	
15	Progresul Dumbrăveni (R)	30	6	3	21	63	121	−58	21	Relegation to Sibiu County Championship
16	Euroil Săliște (R)	30	0	1	29	25	181	−156	1	Relegation to Sibiu County Championship

Rules for classification: 1) Points; 2) Head-to-head points; 3) Head-to-head goal difference; 4) Head-to-head goals scored; 5) Head-to-head away goals scored; 6) Goal difference; 7) Goals scored.
(C) Champions; (Q) Qualified for the phase indicated; (R) Relegated

=== Timiș County ===
Pos	Team	Pld	W	D	L	GF	GA	GD	Pts	Qualification or relegation
1	Recaș (C, Q)	34	29	1	4	96	26	+70	88	Qualification to promotion play-off
2	Șoimii Textila Timișoara	34	23	2	9	79	14	+65	71	
3	Timișul Șag	34	21	6	7	81	31	+50	69	
4	Unirea Sânnicolau Mare	34	17	8	9	59	39	+20	59	
5	Obilici Sânmartinu Sârbesc	34	18	3	13	95	65	+30	57	
6	Mureșul Cenad	34	18	3	13	55	56	−1	57	
7	Tehnolemn Timișoara	34	17	5	12	65	20	+45	56	
8	Unirea Peciu Nou	34	16	6	12	72	48	+24	54	
9	Bancom Comloșu Mare	34	14	6	14	71	58	+13	48	
10	Mondial Lugoj	34	13	8	13	59	42	+17	47	
11	Celuloza Modern Timișoara	34	12	7	15	76	70	+6	43	
12	Timpuri Noi Giarmata	34	12	7	15	51	54	−3	43	
13	Laminorul Nădrag	34	12	5	17	50	89	−39	41	
14	Jimbolia	34	11	6	17	39	76	−37	39	
15	ELBA Făget	34	10	4	20	44	90	−46	34	
16	Phoenix FZB Buziaș (R)	34	7	9	18	46	66	−20	30	Relegation to Timiș County Championship
17	Comtim Timișoara (Note: Rapid GPL Săcălaz was renamed as Comtim Timișoara, after the first part of the season.) (R)	34	7	6	21	54	100	−46	27	Relegation to Timiș County Championship
18	Vulturii Lugoj (R)	34	1	4	29	23	110	−87	7	Relegation to Timiș County Championship

Rules for classification: 1) points; 2) goal difference; 3) number of goals scored.
(C) Champions; (Q) Qualified for the phase indicated; (R) Relegated

=== Vâlcea County ===
Pos	Team	Pld	W	D	L	GF	GA	GD	Pts	Qualification or relegation
1	Flacăra Horezu (C, Q)	34	27	7	0	131	22	+109	88	Qualification to promotion play-off
2	Carpatina Râmnicu Vâlcea	34	26	5	3	104	29	+75	83	
3	Metalul Băbeni	34	23	4	7	78	39	+39	73	
4	Oltchim Râmnicu Vâlcea	34	20	6	8	101	26	+75	66	
5	Oltețul Alunu	34	17	7	10	83	40	+43	58	
6	Peco Râmnicu Vâlcea	34	17	7	10	58	30	+28	58	
7	Lotru Brezoi	34	16	8	10	58	41	+17	56	
8	Petrolul Drăgășani	34	15	8	11	63	44	+19	53	
9	Universal Coop Sutești	34	18	5	11	90	74	+16	53 (Note: Universal Sutești, Sănătatea Govora and Viitorul Budești deducted 6 points.)	
10	Cozia Călimănești	34	15	5	14	79	63	+16	47 (Note: Cozia Călimănești, Minerul Copăceni and Recolta Mateești deducted 3 points.)	
11	Forestierul Băbeni	34	14	3	17	44	63	−19	45	
12	Minerul Copăceni	34	12	6	16	54	64	−10	39	
13	Sănătatea Govora	34	12	2	20	69	95	−26	32	
14	Electra Râmnicu Vâlcea	34	7	6	21	32	82	−50	27	
15	Carpați Râmnicu Vâlcea	34	8	2	24	54	90	−36	26	
16	Viitorul Budești	34	9	3	22	56	125	−69	24	
17	Recolta Mateești	34	5	1	28	31	128	−97	13	
18	Avântul Amărăști	34	2	1	31	29	145	−116	7	

Rules for classification: 1) points; 2) goal difference; 3) number of goals scored.
(C) Champions; (Q) Qualified for the phase indicated

== See also ==
- 1996–97 Divizia A
- 1996–97 Divizia B
- 1996–97 Cupa României
