= ACS Poli Timișoara =

- Full name: Asociația Club Sportiv Poli Timișoara
- Nicknames: Alb-violeții (The White-Purples); Timișorenii (The Timișoara People); Bănățenii (The Banat People); Echipa de pe Bega (The Bega River Team)
- Short name: Poli
- Founded: 2012
- Dissolved: 2021

Asociația Club Sportiv Poli Timișoara (Romanian pronunciation: [timiˈʃo̯ara]), commonly known as ACS Poli Timișoara, Poli Timișoara or simply ACS Poli, was a Romanian professional football club based in the city of Timișoara, Timiș County.

The team was founded in 2012, the year the old FC Politehnica Timișoara went bankrupt. ACS Recaș was moved to Timișoara and—supported by the City Council of Timișoara and the Timiș County Council—was meant to continue the history of the original entity. It was promoted to the top flight in the 2013–14 season, however attendances were modest as the majority of the former fans chose to support ASU Politehnica Timișoara instead. The Polytechnic University of Timișoara ceased the FC Politehnica brand and records for free use to ACS Poli between 2012 and 2021, but then moved them to ASU Politehnica during the latter year. Also in 2021, ACS Poli was excluded from the Liga III championship and dissolved.

ACS Poli Timișoara played in white and purple kits, although it also used variations of black and white during its first years of existence.

== History ==
Chart showing the progress of Politehnica Timișoara's league finishes from their 1940 debut in the national leagues to the present.

In the summer of 2012, ACS Recaș was moved to Timișoara after the dissolution of FC Politehnica Timișoara. The new club is co-owned by the City Council and the County Council and has the backing of the Politehnica University of Timișoara, all three being active members in the legal entity running the club. However, the ultras supporters rejected the move and decided to support an alternative project in the lower leagues, ASU Politehnica Timişoara.

Valentin Velcea continued as head coach, while the roster consisted mostly of the core ACS Recaș players and several players from FC Politehnica. At its conception, the club, established as an NGO, was primarily financed by the local authorities, as Timișoara mayor Nicolae Robu insisted control should not be forfeited to private investors. After initially playing in black/white/yellow kits, in order to avoid legal complications while the court ruled over the rightful owner following the bankruptcy of FC Politehnica, the club returned to its historic white-purple colors starting with the 2015–2016 season. As of February 2016, ACS Poli Timişoara is the sole and full owner of all the rights pertaining to and deriving from the Politehnica Timișoara brand and records, following a court decision which nullified the original agreement between the founding club and record holders, and Marian Iancu's insolvent club.

From a competitive perspective, the club failed to equal the achievements of the Marian Iancu era. A yo-yo-ing between the first two leagues, reminiscent of the Politehnica's travails in the 1980s, ensued. The situation was amplified by the fact that the financing received from the local authorities was deemed illegal in the summer of 2015, which left the club without its main financial benefactor. The highlight season for the new Poli came about in 2016–2017, when the club started with a 14 points penalty, as it failed to reach a points minimum the previous year and recorded unpaid debts. In spite of this, Poli, under the management of Ionuţ Popa, rallied to reach the relegation play-off in the dying minutes of the season and defeated rivals UTA Arad 5–2 on aggregate. Moreover, the club reached the first national cup final, finishing runner-up in the Cupa Ligii, while also reaching the semi-finals of the Romanian Cup.

The following season was another struggle and Poli suffered a reversal of fortunes as they were relegated by courtesy of a goal scored late in the last matchday. With financial pressures mounting, the club declared insolvency during the 2018–2019 Liga 2 season and struggled to stay competitive, becoming involved in another fight to avoid relegation. In order to mitigate costs, it was also forced to relocate from the Dan Păltinişanu stadium to the Electrica stadium.

The Romanian Football Federation announced ahead of the start of the 2021–22 Liga II championship that the Polytechnic University of Timișoara, the owner of the logo, history and all of Politehnica Timișoara's football records, approves the use of these by SSU Politehnica Timișoara. ACS Poli was also excluded from the third division and went bankrupt in September 2021.

== Supporters and Rivalries ==
Historically, Poli has been the most prominent football club in Timișoara after 1945, playing consistently in either the first or the second tier of Romanian football. Local rivalries with CFR Timișoara and UM Timișoara were relevant until the early 2000s. Afterwards, the former was relegated to a semi-professional status in the lower leagues and the latter was dissolved in 2008.

Nationally, there were strong rivalries with UTA Arad and Dinamo București. The matches against UTA were labeled as the West Derby, due to the proximity of Timișoara and Arad. Matches against CFR Cluj, FCSB, and Universitatea Craiova also drew large crowds.

After the club reincarnated as ACS Poli in 2012, the core factions of the ultras movement decided to support an alternative club in the lower leagues, ASU Politehnica Timișoara. ACS Poli struggled to fill the void created by their departure, with smaller fan factions forming to support the club. Although top-bill matches with historic rivals still attract fans to the stadium, attendances have dropped compared to the averages attained in the 2000s.

== Stadia ==
The club's home ground was Electrica stadium, although most of its history it played on Dan Păltinișanu Stadium.

== Honours ==
=== Leagues ===
Liga II

- Winners (1): 2014–15
- Runners-up (1): 2012–13

Liga III:

- Winners (1): 2011–12
- Runners-up (1): 2010–11

Liga IV – Timiș County

- Winners (2): 1996–97, 2008–09
- Runners-up (1): 1995–96

Liga V – Timiș County

- Winners (1): 1994–95

=== Cups ===
- Romanian Cup
  - Winners (0):
  - Runners-up (0):
  - Best finish: Semi-finals: 2016–17 Cupa României
- Cupa Ligii
  - Runners-up (1): 2016–17

== Shirt sponsors and manufacturers ==
Period	Kit manufacturer	Period	Shirt partner
2012–2015	(Italy) Macron	2012–2015
2015–2018	(Spain) Joma	2015–2018	Casa Rusu
2019	(Netherlands) Beltona	2019
2020–2021	(Italy) Acerbis	2020–2021	Dplay Sport

== Notable former players ==
The footballers enlisted below have had international cap(s) for their respective countries at junior and/or senior level and/or more than 50 caps for ACS Poli Timișoara.

- (Romania) Andrei Artean
- (Romania) Cristian Bărbuț
- (Romania) Claudiu Belu
- (Romania) Cosmin Ionut Timis
- (Romania) Cristian Bocșan
- (Romania) Cristian Boldea
- (Romania) Gabriel Cânu
- (Romania) Valentin Crețu
- (Romania) Marius Croitoru
- (Romania) Alexandru Curtean
- (Romania) Cristian Daminuță
- (Romania) Cătălin Doman
- (Romania) Octavian Drăghici
- (Romania) Róbert Elek
- (Romania) Dorin Goga
- (Brazil) Pedro Henrique
- (Spain) Javi Hernández
- (Bulgaria) Mario Kirev
- (Romania) Srdjan Luchin
- (Romania) Sebastian Mailat
- (Serbia) Marko Marović
- (Romania) Cristian Melinte
- (Romania) Florin Nanu
- (Romania) George Neagu
- (England) Alex Nimely
- (Romania) Ovidiu Petre
- (Romania) Adrian Poparadu
- (Romania) Ovidiu Popescu
- (Romania) Alexandru Popovici
- (Romania) Răzvan Raț
- (Bulgaria) Georgi Sarmov
- (Romania) Cristian Scutaru
- (Romania) Alin Șeroni
- (Moldova) Eugen Sidorenco
- (Romania) Cătălin Straton
- (Romania) Bogdan Străuț
- (Romania) Szabolcs Székely
- (Moldova) Igor Țîgîrlaș
- (Romania) Răzvan Trandu
- (Romania) Ianis Zicu

== Notable former managers ==
- (Romania) Dan Alexa
- (Romania) Silviu Bălace
- (Romania) Florin Marin
- (Romania) Ionuț Popa
- (Romania) Aurel Șunda
- (Romania) Valentin Velcea

== Players ==
=== Appearances ===
Competitive, professional matches only. Only pertains to 2012 onwards.

As of 1 March 2019

	Name	Years	League	Cup	Other	Total
1	(Romania) Cristian Bărbuț	2013–2017	120	11	2	133
2	(Romania) Alin Șeroni	2012–2014; 2016–2018	102	10	2	114
3	(Romania) Cristian Scutaru	2012–2017	100	9	1	110
4	(Romania) Gabriel Cânu	2014–2018	96	7	2	105
5	(Romania) Alexandru Popovici	2013–2017; 2018	94	10	1	105

=== Goalscorers ===
Competitive, professional matches only. Appearances, including substitutes, appear in brackets. Only pertains to 2012 onwards.

As of 1 March 2019

#	Name	Years	League	Cup	Other	Total	Ratio
1	(Romania) Szabolcs Szekely	2012–2015	18 (57)	2 (2)	0 (0)	20 (59)	0.34
2	(Brazil) Pedro Henrique	2014–2017	16 (40)	2 (3)	2 (2)	20 (45)	0.44
3	(Romania) Octavian Drăghici	2016–2019	16 (64)	3 (8)	1 (1)	20 (73)	0.27
4	(Romania) Cristian Bărbuț	2012–2017	13 (120)	1 (11)	1 (2)	15 (133)	0.11
5	(Romania) Alexandru Popovici	2013–2017	12 (94)	2 (10)	0 (1)	14 (105)	0.13

== League history ==
Season	Tier	Division	Place	Cupa României
2021–22	3	Liga III (Seria VIII)	10th (R)	
2020–21	3	Liga III (Seria VIII)	6th	
2019–20	3	Liga III (Seria IV)	14th	
2018–19	2	Liga II	18th (R)	
2017–18	1	Liga I	13th (R)	Round of 16

Season	Tier	Division	Place	Cupa României
2016–17	1	Liga I	12th (O)	Semi-finals
2015–16	1	Liga I	13th	Quarter-finals
2014–15	2	Liga II	1st (C, P)	
2013–14	1	Liga I	16th (R)	Round of 16
2012–13	2	Liga II	2nd (P)	
