= Alin Șeroni =

Romanian footballer

Personal information
- Full name: Alin Ioan Șeroni
- Date of birth: 26 March 1987 (age 39)
- Place of birth: Belinț, Romania
- Height: 1.93 m (6 ft 4 in)
- Position: Centre-back

Team information
- Current team: Dumbrăvița
- Number: 30

Youth career
- –2005: CSȘ Lugoj

Senior career*
Years	Team	Apps	(Gls)
2005–2006	Auxerre Lugoj		
2006–2009	Bihor Oradea	13	(1)
2007–2008	→ FC Săcele (loan)	21	(0)
2008–2009	→ Prefab 05 Modelu (loan)	11	(0)
2009–2012	ACS Recaș		
2012–2014	ACS Poli Timișoara	47	(6)
2014	Viitorul Constanța	2	(0)
2015	FC Brașov	0	(0)
2015–2016	Speranța Nisporeni	23	(2)
2016–2018	ACS Poli Timișoara	55	(5)
2018	Dunărea Călărași	7	(0)
2019	UTA Arad	21	(2)
2020–2025	Botoșani	133	(4)
2025	Politehnica Iași	11	(0)
2026–	Dumbrăvița	21	(6)
- * Club domestic league appearances and goals as of 31 October 2026

Alin Ioan Șeroni (born 26 March 1987) is a Romanian professional footballer who plays as a centre-back for Liga II club Dumbrăvița, which he captains.

== Career ==
Șeroni made his Liga I debut playing for ACS Poli Timișoara on 19 July 2013 in a match against Dinamo București.

== Honours ==
Auxerre Lugoj

- Divizia C: 2005–06

ACS Recaș

- Liga III: 2011–12
- Liga IV – Timiș County: 2009–10

ACS Poli Timișoara

- Cupa Ligii runner-up: 2016–17
