= Cristian Boldea =

Romanian footballer

Personal information
- Full name: Cristian Nicolae Boldea
- Date of birth: 12 December 1985 (age 40)
- Place of birth: Oravița, Romania
- Height: 1.75 m (5 ft 9 in)
- Position: Left midfielder

Senior career*
Years	Team	Apps	(Gls)
- AS Oraviţa
- Millenium Giarmata
- Viitorul Sânandrei
2012	ACS Recaș		
2012–2016	Poli Timișoara	72	(12)
- * Club domestic league appearances and goals as of 20 March 2016

Cristian Nicolae Boldea (born 12 December 1985) is a retired Romanian professional footballer who played as a left midfielder.

== Club career ==
Born in Oravița, Cristian Boldea played for a few years at the team from his hometown, AS Oravița, in Liga IV – Caraș-Severin County, then he took the road to Timiș County, where he performed in turns at Millenium Giarmata, Viitorul Sânandrei and ACS Recaș.

With Recaș won the Series V of the 2011–12 Liga III season and made its debut in Liga II in the 2012–13 Liga II season.

Boldea made his Liga I debut playing for ACS Poli Timișoara on 19 July 2013 in a match against Dinamo București.
