= Florin Nanu =

Romanian footballer

Personal information
- Full name: Florin Nanu
- Date of birth: 9 August 1983 (age 43)
- Place of birth: Lugoj, Romania
- Height: 1.72 m (5 ft 7 1/2 in)
- Position: Left midfielder

Team information
- Current team: Dumbrăvița
- Number: 11

Senior career*
Years	Team	Apps	(Gls)
	Progresul Racovița	?	(?)
2008–2009	CSM Reșița	?	(?)
2009–2010	NMM Becicherecu Mic	?	(?)
2010–2012	ACS Recaș	?	(?)
2012–2015	Poli Timișoara	49	(5)
2015–2017	Ripensia Timișoara	4	(0)
2017–	Dumbrăvița	?	(?)
- * Club domestic league appearances and goals as of 15 February 2016

Florin Nanu (born 9 August 1983) is a Romanian professional footballer who plays as a left midfielder for Liga III club ACS Dumbrăvița.

== Club career ==
Nanu made his Liga I debut playing for ACS Poli Timișoara on 19 July 2013 in a match against Dinamo București.
