= Szabolcs Székely =

Romanian footballer

Personal information
- Full name: Szabolcs Gergely Székely
- Date of birth: June 29, 1985 (age 41)
- Place of birth: Aiud, Romania
- Height: 1.84 m (6 ft 0 in)
- Position: Striker

Youth career
- 1994–2000: Metalul Aiud
- 2000–2003: Gloria Bistrița

Senior career*
Years	Team	Apps	(Gls)
2003–2006	Gloria Bistrița	7	(0)
2003–2006	Gloria II Bistrița	8	(1)
2004	→ Oașul Negrești-Oaș (loan)	10	(4)
2005–2006	→ Apulum Alba Iulia (loan)	10	(0)
2006–2009	Unirea Urziceni	4	(0)
2006–2007	→ Poiana Câmpina (loan)	15	(6)
2007–2008	→ Otopeni (loan)	23	(5)
2008	→ Internațional (loan)	14	(6)
2009	→ CFR Timișoara (loan)	13	(7)
2010	CFR Timișoara	6	(1)
2009–2010	Arieșul Turda	6	(0)
2010–2012	Recaș	26	(20)
2012–2014	Poli Timișoara	57	(18)
2015	UTA Arad	14	(3)
2016–2017	Performanța Ighiu	5	(2)
2017	Cetate Deva	9	(5)
2017–2018	Lugoj	19	(6)
2018–2019	Național Sebiș	26	(17)
2019–2020	Progresul Pecica	14	(5)
Total		286	(106)
- * Club domestic league appearances and goals as of 09:13, 6 October 2021 (UTC)

Szabolcs Gergely Székely (born June 29, 1985) is a Romanian former footballer who played as a striker . In his career Székely played in the Liga I for Gloria Bistriţa and Poli Timișoara and in the Liga II or Liga III for various teams such as: Unirea Alba Iulia, Unirea Urziceni, CFR Timișoara, UTA Arad or CSM Lugoj, among others.

== Honours ==
=== Club ===
Gloria Bistrița II

- Divizia C: 2004–05

ACS Recaș

- Liga III: 2011–12
