= Răzvan Trandu =

Romanian footballer

Personal information
- Full name: Răzvan Trandu
- Date of birth: 17 March 1991 (age 35)
- Place of birth: Timișoara, Romania
- Height: 1.78 m (5 ft 10 in)
- Position: Centre midfielder

Team information
- Current team: Avântul Periam
- Number: 9

Youth career
- 2005–2008: UM Timișoara

Senior career*
Years	Team	Apps	(Gls)
2008–2010	Fortuna Covaci	53	(8)
2010–2012	FC Politehnica II	12	(2)
2011–2012	→ Recaș (loan)	29	(11)
2012–2015	Poli Timișoara	71	(8)
2015–2016	Rapid București	20	(6)
2017–2021	Avântul Periam	38	(4)
2022	Ghiroda	10	(1)
2022	Comloșu Mare	18	(5)
2023	Voința Mașloc	18	(6)
2023–2024	Ghiroda	23	(16)
2024–	Avântul Periam	0	(0)
- * Club domestic league appearances and goals as of 13:25, 7 November 2024 (UTC)

Răzvan Trandu (born 17 March 1991) is a Romanian professional footballer who plays as a centre midfielder for Liga III side Avântul Periam.

== Club career ==
Trandu made his Liga I debut playing for ACS Poli Timișoara on 19 July 2013 in a match against Dinamo București.

== Personal life ==
Răzvan Trandu's father, Orlando was a referee, a football coach and a football player who played for UM Timișoara and Politehnica Timișoara and his grandfather Vasile was a footballer who played for UM Timișoara.
