= Liga IV Mureș =

Fourth tier Romanian football league

- Founded: 1968
- Country: Romania
- Level on pyramid: 4
- Promotion to: Liga III
- Relegation to: Liga V Mureș
- Domestic cup: Cupa României – County phase
- Current champions: Transilvania Târgu Mureș (1st title) (2025–26)
- Most championships: Sovata and Iernut (6 titles each)
- Website: frf-ajf.ro/mures
- Current: 2025–26 Liga IV Mureș

Liga IV Mureș, officially known as Liga IV Elite, is one of the regional football divisions of Liga IV, the fourth tier of the Romanian football league system, for clubs based in Mureș County, and is organized by AJF Mureș – Asociația Județeană de Fotbal (lit. 'County Football Association').

It is contested by a variable number of teams, depending on the number of teams relegated from Liga III, the number of teams promoted from Liga V Mureș, and the teams that withdraw or enter the competition. The winner may or may not be promoted to Liga III, depending on the result of a promotion play-off contested against the winner of a neighboring county series.

== History ==
In 1968, following the new administrative and territorial reorganization of the country, each county established its own football championship, integrating teams from the former regional championships as well as those that had previously competed in town and rayon level competitions. The freshly formed Mureș County Championship was placed under the authority of the newly created Consiliul Județean pentru Educație Fizică și Sport (lit. 'County Council for Physical Education and Sports') in Mureș County.

Since then, the structure and organization of Liga IV Mureș, like those of other county championships, have undergone numerous changes. Between 1968 and 1992, the main county competition was known as the Campionatul Județean (County Championship). Between 1992 and 1997, it was renamed Divizia C – Faza Județeană (Divizia C – County Phase), followed by Divizia D starting in 1997, and since 2006, it has been known as Liga IV.

== Promotion ==
The champions of each county association play against one another in a play-off to earn promotion to Liga III. Geographical criteria are taken into consideration when the play-offs are drawn. In total, there are 41 county champions plus the Bucharest municipal champion.

== List of Champions ==
=== Mureș Regional Championship ===
Ed.	Season	Winners
1	1951	Avântul Reghin
2	1952	Avântul Reghin
3	1953	Spartac Târgu Mureș
4	1954	Dinamo Târgu Mureș
5	1955	
6	1956	
7	1957–58	Alimentara Târgu Mureș
8	1958–59	
9	1959–60	Voința Târgu Mureș
10	1960–61	Rapid IRA Târgu Mureș
11	1961–62	Avântul Reghin
12	1962–63	Rapid Târgu Mureș
13	1963–64	ASM Odorheiu Secuiesc
14	1964–65	Progresul Reghin
15	1965–66	Confecția Odorheiu Secuiesc
16	1966–67	Știința Târgu Mureș
17	1967–68	Lemnarul Odorheiu Secuiesc

=== Mureș County Championship ===
Ed.	Season	Winners
1	1968–69	Lemnarul Târgu Mureș
County Championship
2	1969–70	CFR Sighișoara
3	1970–71	Viitorul Târgu Mureș
4	1971–72	Lacul Ursu Sovata
5	1972–73	Avântul Reghin
6	1973–74	Mureșul Luduș
7	1974–75	Mureșul Luduș
8	1975–76	Mureșul Luduș
9	1976–77	Oțelul Reghin
10	1977–78	Sticla Târnaveni
11	1978–79	Faianța Sighișoara
12	1979–80	Electrozahăr Târgu Mureș
13	1980–81	Metalotehnica Târgu Mureș
14	1981–82	Electromureș Târgu Mureș
15	1982–83	Electromureș Târgu Mureș
16	1983–84	Metalul Reghin
17	1984–85	Lacul Ursu Sovata
18	1985–86	Metalul Reghin
19	1986–87	Lacul Ursu Sovata
20	1987–88	IRA Târgu Mureș
21	1988–89	Transportul Târgu Mureș
23	1990–91	Metalul Sighișoara
24	1991–92	Merum Reghin
Divizia C – County phase
25	1992–93	Avicola Unirea Ungheni
26	1993–94	Chimica Târnaveni
27	1994–95	Electromureș Târgu Mureș
28	1995–96	Iernut
29	1996–97	Reghin
Divizia D
30	1997–98	Electromureș Târgu Mureș
31	1998–99	Avântul Silva Reghin
32	1999–00	Gaz Metan Târgu Mureș
33	2000–01	Unirea Ungheni
34	2001–02	Lacul Ursu Mobila Sovata
35	2002–03	Lacul Ursu Mobila Sovata
36	2003–04	Mureșul Romvelo Luduș
37	2004–05	Trans-Sil Târgu Mureș
38	2005–06	Avântul Miheșu de Câmpie

Ed.	Season	Winners
Liga IV
39	2006–07	Gaz Metan Târgu Mureș
40	2007–08	Miercurea Nirajului
41	2008–09	Miercurea Nirajului
42	2009–10	Gaz Metan Târgu Mureș
43	2010–11	FCM Târgu Mureș II
44	2011–12	Lacul Ursu Mobila Sovata
45	2012–13	Mureșul Luduș
46	2013–14	Iernut
47	2014–15	Viitorul Ungheni
48	2015–16	Mureșul Luduș
49	2016–17	Mureșul Rușii-Munți
50	2017–18	MSE 08 Târgu Mureș
51	2018–19	CSM Târgu Mureș
52	2019–20	Unirea Ungheni
53	2020–21	Iernut
54	2021–22	MSE 1898 Târgu Mureș
55	2022–23	Iernut
56	2023–24	Iernut
57	2024–25	ASA Târgu Mureș
58	2025–26	Transilvania Târgu Mureș

== See also ==
=== Main Leagues ===
- Liga I
- Liga II
- Liga III
- Liga IV

=== County Leagues (Liga IV series) ===
North–East

- Liga IV Bacău
- Liga IV Botoșani
- Liga IV Iași
- Liga IV Neamț
- Liga IV Suceava
- Liga IV Vaslui

North–West

- Liga IV Bihor
- Liga IV Bistrița-Năsăud
- Liga IV Cluj
- Liga IV Maramureș
- Liga IV Satu Mare
- Liga IV Sălaj

Center

- Liga IV Alba
- Liga IV Brașov
- Liga IV Covasna
- Liga IV Harghita
- Liga IV Mureș
- Liga IV Sibiu

West

- Liga IV Arad
- Liga IV Caraș-Severin
- Liga IV Gorj
- Liga IV Hunedoara
- Liga IV Mehedinți
- Liga IV Timiș

South–West

- Liga IV Argeș
- Liga IV Dâmbovița
- Liga IV Dolj
- Liga IV Olt
- Liga IV Teleorman
- Liga IV Vâlcea

South

- Liga IV Bucharest
- Liga IV Călărași
- Liga IV Giurgiu
- Liga IV Ialomița
- Liga IV Ilfov
- Liga IV Prahova

South–East

- Liga IV Brăila
- Liga IV Buzău
- Liga IV Constanța
- Liga IV Galați
- Liga IV Tulcea
- Liga IV Vrancea
