= Octavian Drăghici =

Romanian footballer

Personal information
- Full name: Octavian Valentin Drăghici
- Date of birth: 26 November 1985 (age 40)
- Place of birth: Timișoara, Romania
- Height: 1.82 m (5 ft 11 1/2 in)
- Position: Forward

Team information
- Current team: SV Rottenmann
- Number: 11

Youth career
- 1996–2003: UM Timișoara

Senior career*
Years	Team	Apps	(Gls)
2003–2007	UM Timișoara	62	(30)
2007–2008	Fortuna Covaci	24	(16)
2008–2011	Otopeni	51	(17)
2011–2012	Universitatea Cluj	25	(4)
2011	→ UTA Arad (loan)	15	(6)
2013	Gaz Metan Mediaș	5	(0)
2013–2014	Olt Slatina	8	(2)
2014–2015	ASU Politehnica	19	(27)
2015–2016	Racing Beirut	17	(8)
2016–2019	ACS Poli Timișoara	64	(16)
2019	Ripensia Timișoara	15	(4)
2019–2021	Dumbrăvița	25	(17)
2021–	SV Rottenmann	7	(4)
- * Club domestic league appearances and goals as of 10 September 2021

Octavian Valentin Drăghici (born 26 November 1985) is a Romanian football player who plays for Austrian club SV Rottenmann. He made his debut in Liga I on 15 August 2008, in a match between CS Otopeni and FC Timișoara.

== Honours ==
=== Club ===
Fortuna Covaci

- Liga III (1): 2008–09

ASU Politehnica Timișoara

- Liga IV Timiș County: 2014–15
