= Liga IV Covasna =

Fourth tier Romanian football league

- Founded: 1968
- Country: Romania
- Level on pyramid: 4
- Promotion to: Liga III
- Relegation to: Liga V Covasna
- Domestic cup: Cupa României – County phase
- Current champions: Carpați Covasna (6th title) (2025–26)
- Most championships: Stăruința Zagon (8 titles)
- Website: frf-ajf.ro/covasna
- Current: 2025–26 Liga IV Covasna

Liga IV Covasna is one of the regional football divisions of Liga IV, the fourth tier of the Romanian football league system, for clubs based in Covasna County, and is organized by AJF Covasna – Asociația Județeană de Fotbal (lit. 'County Football Association').

It is contested by a variable number of teams, depending on the number of teams relegated from Liga III, the number of teams promoted from Liga V Covasna, and the teams that withdraw or enter the competition. The winner may or may not be promoted to Liga III, depending on the result of a promotion play-off contested against the winner of a neighboring county series.

== History ==
In 1968, following the new administrative and territorial reorganization of the country, each county established its own football championship, integrating teams from the former regional championships as well as those that had previously competed in town and rayon level competitions. The freshly formed Covasna County Championship was placed under the authority of the newly created Consiliul Județean pentru Educație Fizică și Sport (lit. 'County Council for Physical Education and Sports') in Tulcea County.

Since then, the structure and organization of Liga IV Covasna, like those of other county championships, have undergone numerous changes. Between 1968 and 1992, the main county competition was known as the Campionatul Județean (County Championship). Between 1992 and 1997, it was renamed Divizia C – Faza Județeană (Divizia C – County Phase), followed by Divizia D starting in 1997, and since 2006, it has been known as Liga IV.

== Promotion ==
The champions of each county association play against one another in a play-off to earn promotion to Liga III. Geographical criteria are taken into consideration when the play-offs are drawn. In total, there are 41 county champions plus the Bucharest municipal champion.

== List of Champions ==
Ed.	Season	Winners
County Championship
1	1968–69	Carpați Covasna
2	1969–70	Forestierul Târgu Secuiesc
3	1970–71	Carpați Covasna
4	1971–72	Unirea Sfântu Gheorghe
5	1972–73	Unirea Sfântu Gheorghe
6	1973–74	Minerul Baraolt
7	1974–75	Metalul Târgu Secuiesc
8	1975–76	Forestierul Covasna
9	1976–77	Forestierul Covasna
10	1977–78	Izvorul Biborțeni
11	1978–79	Carpați Covasna
12	1979–80	Constructorul Sfântu Gheorghe
13	1980–81	Metalul Sfântu Gheorghe
14	1981–82	Constructorul Sfântu Gheorghe
15	1982–83	IPT Întorsura Buzăului
16	1983–84	Metalul Târgu Secuiesc
17	1984–85	IPT Întorsura Buzăului
18	1985–86	Carpați Covasna
19	1986–87	Carpați Covasna
20	1987–88	IPT Întorsura Buzăului
21	1988–89	IPT Întorsura Buzăului
22	1989–90	IPT Întorsura Buzăului
23	1990–91	Avântul Catalina
24	1991–92	Avântul Catalina
Divizia C – County phase
25	1992–93	IMASA Sfântu Gheorghe
26	1993–94	Victoria Ozun
27	1994–95	Bradul Zagon
28	1995–96	Perkö Sânzieni
29	1996–97	Minerul Baraolt
Divizia D
30	1997–98	Fortyogó Târgu Secuiesc
31	1998–99	Sfântu Gheorghe
32	1999–00	Fortyogó Târgu Secuiesc
33	2000–01	Perkö Sânzieni
34	2001–02	Perkö Sânzieni
35	2002–03	Előre Tălișoara
36	2003–04	KSE Târgu Secuiesc
37	2004–05	Baraolt
38	2005–06	Baraolt

Ed.	Season	Winners
Liga IV
39	2006–07	Zagon
40	2007–08	Zagon
41	2008–09	Zagon
42	2009–10	Zagon
43	2010–11	Zagon
44	2011–12	Zagon
45	2012–13	Păpăuți
46	2013–14	Sepsi Sfântu Gheorghe
47	2014–15	Nemere Ghelința
48	2015–16	Nemere Ghelința
49	2016–17	KSE Târgu Secuiesc
50	2017–18	Nemere Ghelința
51	2018–19	Stăruința Zagon
52	2019–20	Sepsi Sfântu Gheorghe II
–	2020–21	Not disputed (Note: Not disputed due to COVID-19 pandemic in Romania.)
53	2021–22	Baraolt
54	2022–23	Prima Brăduț
55	2023–24	Prima Brăduț
56	2024–25	Stăruința Zagon
57	2025–26	Carpați Covasna

== See also ==
=== Main Leagues ===
- Liga I
- Liga II
- Liga III
- Liga IV

=== County Leagues (Liga IV series) ===
North–East

- Liga IV Bacău
- Liga IV Botoșani
- Liga IV Iași
- Liga IV Neamț
- Liga IV Suceava
- Liga IV Vaslui

North–West

- Liga IV Bihor
- Liga IV Bistrița-Năsăud
- Liga IV Cluj
- Liga IV Maramureș
- Liga IV Satu Mare
- Liga IV Sălaj

Center

- Liga IV Alba
- Liga IV Brașov
- Liga IV Covasna
- Liga IV Harghita
- Liga IV Mureș
- Liga IV Sibiu

West

- Liga IV Arad
- Liga IV Caraș-Severin
- Liga IV Gorj
- Liga IV Hunedoara
- Liga IV Mehedinți
- Liga IV Timiș

South–West

- Liga IV Argeș
- Liga IV Dâmbovița
- Liga IV Dolj
- Liga IV Olt
- Liga IV Teleorman
- Liga IV Vâlcea

South

- Liga IV Bucharest
- Liga IV Călărași
- Liga IV Giurgiu
- Liga IV Ialomița
- Liga IV Ilfov
- Liga IV Prahova

South–East

- Liga IV Brăila
- Liga IV Buzău
- Liga IV Constanța
- Liga IV Galați
- Liga IV Tulcea
- Liga IV Vrancea
