= 2016–17 Cupa Ligii =

Tournament details
- Country: Romania
- Teams: 14

Final positions
- Champions: Dinamo București
- Runners-up: ACS Poli Timișoara

Tournament statistics
- Matches played: 15
- Goals scored: 46 (3.07 per match)

The 2016–17 Cupa Ligii was the third and last official season of the Cupa Ligii. Dinamo București won the title for the first time in its history.

All times are CEST (UTC+2).

== Schedule ==
- Qualifying Round: 9–11 August 2016
- Quarter-finals: 7–8 September 2016

== Prize money ==
- Winner: €265,000
- Runner-up: €165,000
- Semi-final: €50,000
- Quarter-final: €25,000
- Qualifying Round: €20,000

== Qualifying round ==
At this stage, all teams participate in 2016–17 Liga I season except for No. 1 (Astra Giurgiu) and 2 (FCSB) 2015–16 Liga I season which directly qualified for the quarterfinals. Thus in this phase will be 12 teams will be divided in 6 games. The winners of those matches will qualify for the quarterfinals.

The teams qualified in this phase are:

- FC Astra Giurgiu
- FC Botoșani
- CFR Cluj
- CS Concordia Chiajna
- FC Dinamo București
- Gaz Metan Mediaș
- CSM Studențesc Iași
- CS Pandurii Târgu Jiu
- ACS Poli Timișoara
- Universitatea Craiova
- FC Viitorul Constanța
- FC Voluntari

All matches were played on 9–11 August 2016

9 August 2016	Botoșani	1–0	CSM Politehnica Iași	Municipal, Botoșani
19:00	Fülöp 9'

10 August 2016	Gaz Metan Mediaș	0–2	ASA Târgu Mureș	Municipal Gaz Metan, Mediaș
16:30			Zicu 74'; Feketics 80'

10 August 2016	ACS Poli Timișoara	2–1	Viitorul Constanța	Dan Păltinișanu, Timișoara
19:00	Artean 16'; Croitoru 81'		Cioablă 3'

10 August 2016	Concordia Chiajna	1–1 (a.e.t.) (4–3 p)	Pandurii Târgu Jiu	Concordia, Chiajna
21:30	Serediuc 14'		Alexandru 34'

11 August 2016	CFR Cluj	0–0 (a.e.t.) (3–2 p)	Universitatea Craiova	Dr. Constantin Rădulescu, Cluj-Napoca
18:00

11 August 2016	Voluntari	1–2	Dinamo București	Dinamo, Bucharest
21:00	Ivanovici 53'		Popa 13', 25'

== Quarter-finals ==
At this stage, 8 teams qualified:

Astra Giurgiu – 1st place 2015–16 Liga I season

FCSB – 2nd place 2015–16 Liga I season

the 6 teams that won in Qualifying Round

- Botoșani

- ASA Târgu Mureș

- ACS Poli Timișoara

- Concordia Chiajna

- CFR Cluj

- Dinamo București

These teams will be divided in four matches. The winners of those matches will qualify for the semifinals.

7 September 2016	ACS Poli Timișoara	2–1	CS Concordia Chiajna	Dan Păltinișanu, Timișoara
18:00	Artean 13'; Croitoru 78'		Albu 74'

7 September 2016	CFR Cluj	1–1 (a.e.t.) (4–5 p)	ASA Târgu Mureș	Dr. Constantin Rădulescu, Cluj-Napoca
21:00	Bud 83'		Kuku 64'

8 September 2016	Botoșani	0–2	Steaua București	Municipal, Botoșani
20:30			Tudorie 45+2'; Popescu 49'

17 November 2016	Astra Giurgiu	2–5 (a.e.t.)	Dinamo București	Marin Anastasovici, Giurgiu
20:30	Alibec 48'; Budescu 70'		Gnohéré 13'; Palić 52' (pen.); Popa 91'; Hanca 104' (pen.); Hanca 115'	Referee: Marcel Bîrsan

== Semi-finals ==
Four teams qualified for the semifinals, namely the winners of the quarterfinals. They are:

1) ACS Poli Timișoara

2) ASA Târgu Mureș

3) Steaua București

4) Dinamo București

Matches will be played in two legs. The winners of those matches will qualify for the League Cup final.

=== 1st leg ===
21 December 2016	ASA Târgu Mureș	2–4	ACS Poli Timișoara	Târgu Mureș
20:30	Ciolacu 26'; Rus 77'		Artean 11' (pen.); Draghici 61'; Llorente 66'; Popovici 90'	Stadium: Trans-Sil

22 December 2016	Dinamo București	4–1	Steaua București	Bucharest
20:30	Mahlangu 19'; Nistor 65'; Lazăr 79'; Rotariu 90'		Aganovic 78'	Stadium: Arena Națională; Attendance: 9,276; Referee: Horațiu Feșnic

=== 2nd leg ===
28 February 2017	ACS Poli Timișoara	3–1 (7–3 agg.)	ASA Târgu Mureș	Timișoara
20:00	Almeida 17', 21'; Cânu 65'		Sin 48'	Stadium: Dan Păltinișanu; Referee: Cătălin Popa

1 March 2017	Steaua București	1–3 (2–7 agg.)	Dinamo București	Bucharest
20:00	Alibec 64' (pen.)		Nistor 37'; Petre 74'; Hanca 82' (pen.)	Stadium: Arena Națională; Referee: Alexandru Tudor

== Final ==
20 May 2017 Final	Dinamo București	2–0	ACS Poli Timișoara	Bucharest
20:00	Nemec 6', 26'			Stadium: Arena Națională; Referee: Radu Petrescu; Assistant referees: Ciprian Danșa, Daniel Mitruți
