= Liga IV Cluj =

Fourth tier Romanian football league

- Founded: 1968
- Country: Romania
- Level on pyramid: 4
- Promotion to: Liga III
- Relegation to: Liga V Cluj
- Domestic cup: Cupa României – County phase
- Current champions: Victoria Viișoara (1st title) (2025–26)
- Most championships: CM Cluj-Napoca and Atletic Olimpia Gherla (5 titles each)
- Website: frf-ajf.ro/cluj
- Current: 2025–26 Liga IV Cluj

Liga IV Cluj is one of the regional football divisions of Liga IV, the fourth tier of the Romanian football league system, for clubs based in Cluj County, and is organized by AJF Cluj – Asociația Județeană de Fotbal (lit. 'County Football Association').

It is contested by a variable number of teams, depending on the number of teams relegated from Liga III, the number of teams promoted from Liga V Cluj, and the teams that withdraw or enter the competition. The winner may or may not be promoted to Liga III, depending on the result of a promotion play-off contested against the winner of a neighboring county series.

== History ==
In 1968, following the new administrative and territorial reorganization of the country, each county established its own football championship, integrating teams from the former regional championships as well as those that had previously competed in town and rayon level competitions. The freshly formed Cluj County Championship was placed under the authority of the newly created Consiliul Județean pentru Educație Fizică și Sport (lit. 'County Council for Physical Education and Sports') in Cluj County.

Since then, the structure and organization of Cluj’s main county competition, like those of other county championships, have undergone numerous changes. Between 1968 and 1992, it was known as Campionatul Județean (County Championship). In 1992, it was renamed Divizia C – Faza Județeană (Divizia C – County Phase), became Divizia D in 1997, and has been known as Liga IV since 2006.

== Promotion ==
The champions of each county association play against one another in a play-off to earn promotion to Liga III. Geographical criteria are taken into consideration when the play-offs are drawn. In total, there are 41 county champions plus the Bucharest municipal champion.

== List of Champions ==
=== Cluj Regional Championship ===
Ed.	Season	Winners
1	1951	Flamura Roșie Cluj
2	1952	Flamura Roșie Turda
3	1953	Flamura Roșie Cluj
4	1954	Progresul Bistrița
5	1955	
6	1956	Gloria Bistrița
7	1957–58	Metalul Aiud
8	1958–59	
9	1959–60	Sticla Arieșul Turda
10	1960–61	Soda Ocna Mureș
11	1961–62	Unirea Dej
12	1962–63	Gloria Bistrița
13	1963–64	AS Aiud
14	1964–65	CIL Gherla
15	1965–66	Medicina Cluj
16	1966–67	Gloria Bistrița
17	1967–68	Gloria Bistrița (Someș Series); Arieșul Turda (Mureș Series)

=== Cluj County Championship ===
Ed.	Season	Winners
County Championship
1	1968–69	Dermata Cluj
2	1969–70	Cimentul Turda
3	1970–71	Tehnofrig Cluj
4	1971–72	CM Cluj
5	1972–73	Cimentul Turda
6	1973–74	CM Cluj
7	1974–75	Tehnofrig Cluj-Napoca
8	1975–76	Electrometal Cluj-Napoca
9	1976–77	CM Cluj-Napoca
10	1977–78	Viitorul ICMA Cluj-Napoca
11	1978–79	CFR Turda
12	1979–80	Olimpia Gherla
13	1980–81	Olimpia Gherla
14	1981–82	Olimpia Gherla
15	1982–83	Unirea Dej
16	1983–84	Motorul IRA Cluj-Napoca
17	1984–85	Electrometal Cluj-Napoca
18	1985–86	CM Cluj-Napoca
19	1986–87	CM Cluj-Napoca
20	1987–88	CUG Cluj-Napoca
21	1988–89	Unirea Dej
22	1989–90	Electrometal Cluj-Napoca
23	1990–91	Sticla Arieșul Turda
24	1991–92	Dermata Cluj-Napoca
Divizia C – County phase
25	1992–93	Industria Sârmei Câmpia Turzii
26	1993–94	Sticla Arieșul Turda
27	1994–95	Industria Sârmei Câmpia Turzii
28	1995–96	Olimpia Gherla
29	1996–97	Olimpia Gherla
Divizia D
30	1997–98	Cimentul Turda
31	1998–99	Minerul Ocna Dej
32	1999–00	Minerul Iara
33	2000–01	Romsco Cluj-Napoca
34	2001–02	Dej
35	2002–03	Minerul Iara
36	2003–04	Știința Cluj-Napoca
37	2004–05	Sănătatea Cluj-Napoca
38	2005–06	Universitatea 1919 Cluj-Napoca

Ed.	Season	Winners
Liga IV
39	2006–07	Minerul Iara-Băișoara
40	2007–08	CFR Cluj-Napoca II
41	2008–09	Arieșul Turda II
42	2009–10	Unirea Florești
43	2010–11	Leii Tritenii de Jos
44	2011–12	Vulturii Vultureni
45	2012–13	Unirea Jucu
46	2013–14	Plaiul Iacobeni
47	2014–15	Potaissa Turda
48	2015–16	Viitorul Feleacu
49	2016–17	Universitatea Cluj-Napoca
50	2017–18	Sticla Arieșul Turda
51	2018–19	Florești
52	2019–20	Someșul Dej
53	2020–21	Viitorul Cluj
54	2021–22	Supporter 2.0 Cluj-Napoca
55	2022–23	Arieșul Mihai Viteazu
56	2023–24	Vulturul Mintiu Gherlii
57	2024–25	Sticla Arieșul Turda
58	2025–26	Victoria Viișoara

== See also ==
=== Main Leagues ===
- Liga I
- Liga II
- Liga III
- Liga IV

=== County Leagues (Liga IV series) ===
North–East

- Liga IV Bacău
- Liga IV Botoșani
- Liga IV Iași
- Liga IV Neamț
- Liga IV Suceava
- Liga IV Vaslui

North–West

- Liga IV Bihor
- Liga IV Bistrița-Năsăud
- Liga IV Cluj
- Liga IV Maramureș
- Liga IV Satu Mare
- Liga IV Sălaj

Center

- Liga IV Alba
- Liga IV Brașov
- Liga IV Covasna
- Liga IV Harghita
- Liga IV Mureș
- Liga IV Sibiu

West

- Liga IV Arad
- Liga IV Caraș-Severin
- Liga IV Gorj
- Liga IV Hunedoara
- Liga IV Mehedinți
- Liga IV Timiș

South–West

- Liga IV Argeș
- Liga IV Dâmbovița
- Liga IV Dolj
- Liga IV Olt
- Liga IV Teleorman
- Liga IV Vâlcea

South

- Liga IV Bucharest
- Liga IV Călărași
- Liga IV Giurgiu
- Liga IV Ialomița
- Liga IV Ilfov
- Liga IV Prahova

South–East

- Liga IV Brăila
- Liga IV Buzău
- Liga IV Constanța
- Liga IV Galați
- Liga IV Tulcea
- Liga IV Vrancea
