= Liga IV Arad =

Fourth tier Romanian football league

- Founded: 1968
- Country: Romania
- Level on pyramid: 4
- Promotion to: Liga III
- Relegation to: Liga V Arad
- Domestic cup: Cupa României – County phase
- Current champions: Athletico Vinga (1st title) (2025–26)
- Most championships: ACB Ineu (5 titles)
- Website: ajfarad.ro
- Current: 2025–26 Liga IV Arad

Liga IV Arad is one of the regional football divisions of Liga IV, the fourth tier of the Romanian football league system, for clubs based in Arad County, and is organized by AJF Arad – Asociația Județeană de Fotbal (lit. 'County Football Association').

It is contested by a variable number of teams, depending on the number of teams relegated from Liga III, the number of teams promoted from Liga V Arad, and the teams that withdraw or enter the competition. The winner may or may not be promoted to Liga III, depending on the result of a promotion play-off contested against the winner of a neighboring county series.

== History ==
In 1968, following the new administrative and territorial reorganization of the country, each county established its own football championship, integrating teams from the former regional championships as well as those that had previously competed in town and rayon level competitions. The freshly formed Arad County Championship was placed under the authority of the newly created Consiliul Județean pentru Educație Fizică și Sport (lit. 'County Council for Physical Education and Sports') in Arad County.

Since then, the structure and organization of Arad’s main county competition, like those of other county championships, have undergone numerous changes. Between 1968 and 1992, it was known as Campionatul Județean (County Championship). In 1992, it was renamed Divizia C – Faza Județeană (Divizia C – County Phase), became Divizia D in 1997, and has been known as Liga IV since 2006.

== Promotion ==
The champions of each county association play against one another in a play-off to earn promotion to Liga III. Geographical criteria are taken into consideration when the play-offs are drawn. In total, there are 41 county champions plus the Bucharest municipal champion.

== List of champions ==
=== Arad Regional Championship ===
| Ed. | Season | Winners |
|---|---|---|
| 1 | 1951 | Constructorul Arad |
| 2 | 1952 | Metalul AMEFA Arad |
| 3 | 1953 | Constructorul Arad |
| 4 | 1954 | Metalul AMEFA Arad |
| 5 | 1955 | Constructorul Arad |
| 6 | 1956 | |

=== Arad County Championship ===
| Ed. | Season | Winners |
County Championship
| 1 | 1968–69 | Teba Arad |
| 2 | 1969–70 | Gloria Arad |
| 3 | 1970–71 | Gloria Arad |
| 4 | 1971–72 | Constructorul Arad |
| 5 | 1972–73 | Crișana Sebiș |
| 6 | 1973–74 | Gloria Ineu |
| 7 | 1974–75 | Gloria Arad |
| 8 | 1975–76 | Șoimii Lipova |
| 9 | 1976–77 | Libertatea Arad |
| 10 | 1977–78 | Victoria Ineu |
| 11 | 1978–79 | Gloria Ineu |
| 12 | 1979–80 | Șoimii Lipova |
| 13 | 1980–81 | Chimia Arad |
| 14 | 1981–82 | Frontiera Curtici |
| 15 | 1982–83 | Chimia Arad |
| 16 | 1983–84 | Motorul Arad |
| 17 | 1984–85 | Strungul Chișineu-Criș |
| 18 | 1985–86 | CFR Arad |
| 19 | 1986–87 | Motorul IMA Arad |
| 20 | 1987–88 | Petrolul Arad |
| 21 | 1988–89 | Victoria Ineu |
| 22 | 1989–90 | CFR Arad |
| 23 | 1990–91 | CPL Arad |
| 24 | 1991–92 | Șoimii Pâncota |
Divizia C – County phase
| 25 | 1992–93 | CPL Arad |
| 26 | 1993–94 | West Petrom Pecica |
| 27 | 1994–95 | Telecom Arad |
| 28 | 1995–96 | CPL Arad |
| 29 | 1996–97 | Indagrara Arad |
Divizia D
| 30 | 1997–98 | Șoimii Pâncota |
| 31 | 1998–99 | Universitatea Arad |
| 32 | 1999–00 | Motorul Astra Arad |
| 33 | 2000–01 | Tricotaje Ineu |
| 34 | 2001–02 | Frontiera Curtici |
| 35 | 2002–03 | Șiriana Șiria |
| 36 | 2003–04 | Victoria Nădlac |
| 37 | 2004–05 | Gloria CTP Arad |
| 38 | 2005–06 | Voința Macea |

| Ed. | Season | Winners |
Liga IV
| 39 | 2006–07 | CNM Pâncota |
| 40 | 2007–08 | Național Sebiș |
| 41 | 2008–09 | Partizan Satu Mare |
| 42 | 2009–10 | Frontiera Curtici |
| 43 | 2010–11 | Vladimirescu |
| 44 | 2011–12 | Șoimii Pâncota |
| 45 | 2012–13 | Ineu |
| 46 | 2013–14 | UTA Bătrâna Doamnă |
| 47 | 2014–15 | Progresul Pecica |
| 48 | 2015–16 | Gloria Lunca-Teuz Cermei |
| 49 | 2016–17 | Șoimii Lipova |
| 50 | 2017–18 | Crișul Chișineu-Criș |
| 51 | 2018–19 | Progresul Pecica |
| 52 | 2019–20 | Victoria Zăbrani |
| 53 | 2020–21 | Frontiera Curtici |
| 54 | 2021–22 | ACB Ineu |
| 55 | 2022–23 | Socodor |
| 56 | 2023–24 | Viitorul Arad |
| 57 | 2024–25 | Unirea Sântana |
| 58 | 2025–26 | Athletico Vinga |

== See also ==
=== Main Leagues ===
- Liga I
- Liga II
- Liga III
- Liga IV

=== County Leagues (Liga IV series) ===
North–East

- Liga IV Bacău
- Liga IV Botoșani
- Liga IV Iași
- Liga IV Neamț
- Liga IV Suceava
- Liga IV Vaslui

North–West

- Liga IV Bihor
- Liga IV Bistrița-Năsăud
- Liga IV Cluj
- Liga IV Maramureș
- Liga IV Satu Mare
- Liga IV Sălaj

Center

- Liga IV Alba
- Liga IV Brașov
- Liga IV Covasna
- Liga IV Harghita
- Liga IV Mureș
- Liga IV Sibiu

West

- Liga IV Arad
- Liga IV Caraș-Severin
- Liga IV Gorj
- Liga IV Hunedoara
- Liga IV Mehedinți
- Liga IV Timiș

South–West

- Liga IV Argeș
- Liga IV Dâmbovița
- Liga IV Dolj
- Liga IV Olt
- Liga IV Teleorman
- Liga IV Vâlcea

South

- Liga IV Bucharest
- Liga IV Călărași
- Liga IV Giurgiu
- Liga IV Ialomița
- Liga IV Ilfov
- Liga IV Prahova

South–East

- Liga IV Brăila
- Liga IV Buzău
- Liga IV Constanța
- Liga IV Galați
- Liga IV Tulcea
- Liga IV Vrancea
