= Liga IV Caraș-Severin =

Fourth tier Romanian football league

- Founded: 1968
- Country: Romania
- Level on pyramid: 4
- Promotion to: Liga III
- Relegation to: Liga V Caraș-Severin
- Domestic cup: Cupa României – County phase
- Current champions: Nera Bogodinț (2nd title) (2025–26)
- Most championships: CFR Caransebeș (7 titles)
- Website: frf-ajf.ro/caras-severin
- Current: 2025–26 Liga IV Caraș-Severin

Liga IV Caraș-Severin is one of the regional football divisions of Liga IV, the fourth tier of the Romanian football league system, for clubs based in Caraș-Severin County, and is organized by AJF Caraș-Severin – Asociația Județeană de Fotbal (lit. 'County Football Association').

It is contested by a variable number of teams, depending on the number of teams relegated from Liga III, the number of teams promoted from Liga V Caraș-Severin, and the teams that withdraw or enter the competition. The winner may or may not be promoted to Liga III, depending on the result of a promotion play-off contested against the winner of a neighboring county series.

== History ==
In 1968, following the new administrative and territorial reorganization of the country, each county established its own football championship, integrating teams from the former regional championships as well as those that had previously competed in town and rayon level competitions. The freshly formed Caraș-Severin County Championship was placed under the authority of the newly created Consiliul Județean pentru Educație Fizică și Sport (lit. 'County Council for Physical Education and Sports') in Caraș-Severin County.

Since then, the structure and organization of Caraș-Severin’s main county competition, like those of other county championships, have undergone numerous changes. Between 1968 and 1992, it was known as Campionatul Județean (County Championship). In 1992, it was renamed Divizia C – Faza Județeană (Divizia C – County Phase), became Divizia D in 1997, and has been known as Liga IV since 2006.

== Promotion ==
The champions of each county association play against one another in a play-off to earn promotion to Liga III. Geographical criteria are taken into consideration when the play-offs are drawn. In total, there are 41 county champions plus the Bucharest municipal champion.

== List of champions ==
=== Severin Regional Championship ===
Ed.	Season	Winners
1	1951	Flacăra Anina
2	1952	Metalul Reșița

=== Caraș-Severin County Championship ===
Ed.	Season	Winners
County Championship
1	1968–69	CFR Caransebeș
2	1969–70	Minerul Moldova Nouă
3	1970–71	Metalul Oțelu Roșu
4	1971–72	Minerul Oravița
5	1972–73	CFR Caransebeș
6	1973–74	Minerul Oravița
7	1974–75	Gloria Reșița
8	1975–76	Nera Bozovici
9	1976–77	Minerul Oravița
10	1977–78	CFR Caransebeș
11	1978–79	CPL Caransebeș
12	1979–80	CFR Caransebeș
13	1980–81	ICM Caransebeș
14	1981–82	Automecanica Reșița
15	1982–83	Metalul Oțelu Roșu
16	1983–84	CSM Caransebeș
17	1984–85	Automecanica Reșița
18	1985–86	Automecanica Reșița
19	1986–87	Automecanica Reșița
20	1987–88	Foresta Caransebeș
21	1988–89	Constructorul Anina
22	1989–90	Minerul Oravița
23	1990–91	Metalul Oțelu Roșu
24	1991–92	Minerul Oravița
Divizia C – County phase
25	1992–93	Minerul Moldova Nouă
26	1993–94	Vega Caransebeș
27	1994–95	CFR Caransebeș
28	1995–96	Arsenal Reșița
29	1996–97	CFR Caransebeș
Divizia D
30	1997–98	Minerul Moldova Nouă
31	1998–99	Caromet Caransebeș
32	1999–00	Minerul Moldova Nouă
33	2000–01	Metalul Oțelu Roșu
34	2001–02	CFR Caransebeș
35	2002–03	Caromet Caransebeș
36	2003–04	Universitatea Reșița
37	2004–05	Muncitorul Reșița
38	2005–06	Metalul Bocșa

Ed.	Season	Winners
Liga IV
39	2006–07	Gloria Reșița
40	2007–08	Scorilo Caransebeș
41	2008–09	Berzobis Berzovia
42	2009–10	Autocatania Caransebeș
43	2010–11	Gloria Reșița
44	2011–12	Muncitorul Reșița
45	2012–13	Metalul Oțelu Roșu
46	2013–14	Recolta Berzovia
47	2014–15	Voința Lupac
48	2015–16	Școlar Reșița
49	2016–17	Viitorul Caransebeș
50	2017–18	Voința Lupac
51	2018–19	Voința Lupac
52	2019–20	Progresul Ezeriș
53	2020–21	Voința Lupac
54	2021–22	Magica Balta Caransebeș
55	2022–23	Slatina-Timiș
56	2023–24	Magica Balta Caransebeș
57	2024–25	Nera Bogodinț
58	2025–26	Nera Bogodinț

== See also ==
=== Main Leagues ===
- Liga I
- Liga II
- Liga III
- Liga IV

=== County Leagues (Liga IV series) ===
North–East

- Liga IV Bacău
- Liga IV Botoșani
- Liga IV Iași
- Liga IV Neamț
- Liga IV Suceava
- Liga IV Vaslui

North–West

- Liga IV Bihor
- Liga IV Bistrița-Năsăud
- Liga IV Cluj
- Liga IV Maramureș
- Liga IV Satu Mare
- Liga IV Sălaj

Center

- Liga IV Alba
- Liga IV Brașov
- Liga IV Covasna
- Liga IV Harghita
- Liga IV Mureș
- Liga IV Sibiu

West

- Liga IV Arad
- Liga IV Caraș-Severin
- Liga IV Gorj
- Liga IV Hunedoara
- Liga IV Mehedinți
- Liga IV Timiș

South–West

- Liga IV Argeș
- Liga IV Dâmbovița
- Liga IV Dolj
- Liga IV Olt
- Liga IV Teleorman
- Liga IV Vâlcea

South

- Liga IV Bucharest
- Liga IV Călărași
- Liga IV Giurgiu
- Liga IV Ialomița
- Liga IV Ilfov
- Liga IV Prahova

South–East

- Liga IV Brăila
- Liga IV Buzău
- Liga IV Constanța
- Liga IV Galați
- Liga IV Tulcea
- Liga IV Vrancea
