= Liga IV Constanța =

Fourth tier Romanian football league

- Founded: 1968
- Country: Romania
- Level on pyramid: 4
- Promotion to: Liga III
- Relegation to: Liga V Constanța
- Domestic cup(s): Cupa României; Supercupa României
- Current champions: Portul Constanța (2nd title) (2025–26)
- Most championships: CFR Constanța and Electrica Constanța (5 titles each)
- Website: frf-ajf.ro/constanta
- Current: 2025–26 Liga IV Constanța

Liga IV Constanța is one of the regional football divisions of Liga IV, the fourth tier of the Romanian football league system, for clubs based in Constanța County, and is organized by AJF Constanța – Asociația Județeană de Fotbal (lit. 'County Football Association').

It is contested by a variable number of teams, depending on the number of teams relegated from Liga III, the number of teams promoted from Liga V Constanța, and the teams that withdraw or enter the competition. The winner may or may not be promoted to Liga III, depending on the result of a promotion play-off contested against the winner of a neighboring county series.

== History ==
In 1968, following the new administrative and territorial reorganization of the country, each county established its own football championship, integrating teams from the former regional championships as well as those that had previously competed in town and rayon level competitions. The freshly formed Constanța County Championship was placed under the authority of the newly created Consiliul Județean pentru Educație Fizică și Sport (lit. 'County Council for Physical Education and Sports') in Constanța County.

Since then, the structure and organization of Liga IV Constanța, like those of other county championships, have undergone numerous changes. Between 1968 and 1992, the main county competition was known as the Campionatul Județean (County Championship). Between 1992 and 1997, it was renamed Divizia C – Faza Județeană (Divizia C – County Phase), followed by Divizia D starting in 1997, and since 2006, it has been known as Liga IV.

== Promotion ==
The champions of each county association play against one another in a play-off to earn promotion to Liga III. Geographical criteria are taken into consideration when the play-offs are drawn. In total, there are 41 county champions plus the Bucharest municipal champion.

== List of Champions ==
=== Constanța Regional Championship ===
| Ed. | Season | Winners |
Constanța Regional Championship
| 1 | 1951 | Locomotiva PCA Constanța |
| 2 | 1952 | Șantierul Constanța |
| 3 | 1953 | Locomotiva PCA Constanța |
| 4 | 1954 | Flamura Roșie Constanța |
| 5 | 1955 | Metalul SNC Constanța |
| 6 | 1956 | Metalul IMU Medgidia |
| 7 | 1957–58 | Cimentul Medgidia |
| 8 | 1958–59 | Marina Constanța |
| 9 | 1959–60 | Marina Constanța |
Dobrogea Regional Championship
| 10 | 1960–61 | IMU Medgidia |
| 11 | 1961–62 | IMU Medgidia |
| 12 | 1962–63 | Portul Constanța |
| 13 | 1963–64 | Marina Mangalia |
| 14 | 1964–65 | IMU Medgidia |
| 15 | 1965–66 | Stuful Tulcea |
| 16 | 1966–67 | Cimentul Medgidia |
| 17 | 1967–68 | Marina Mangalia |

=== Constanța County Championship ===
| Ed. | Season | Winners |
County Championship
| 1 | 1968–69 | Metalul Mangalia |
| 2 | 1969–70 | Victoria Medgidia |
| 3 | 1970–71 | Șantierul Naval Constanța |
| 4 | 1971–72 | Știința Constanța |
| 5 | 1972–73 | Voința Constanța |
| 6 | 1973–74 | Dunărea Cernavodă |
| 7 | 1974–75 | Gloria Murfatlar |
| 8 | 1975–76 | Șantierul Naval Constanța |
| 9 | 1976–77 | Chimpex Constanța |
| 10 | 1977–78 | Voința Constanța |
| 11 | 1978–79 | Minerul Medgidia |
| 12 | 1979–80 | Metalul Mangalia |
| 13 | 1980–81 | CFR Constanța |
| 14 | 1981–82 | Dobrogea Canal Basarabi |
| 15 | 1982–83 | Electrica Constanța |
| 16 | 1983–84 | Marina Mangalia |
| 17 | 1984–85 | Electrica Constanța |
| 18 | 1985–86 | Litoral Mangalia |
| 19 | 1986–87 | Conpref Constanța |
| 20 | 1987–88 | Marina Mangalia |
| 21 | 1988–89 | Voința Constanța |
| 22 | 1989–90 | Litoral Mangalia |
| 23 | 1990–91 | CFR Constanța |
| 24 | 1991–92 | Cimentul Medgidia |
Divizia C – County phase
| 25 | 1992–93 | Conpref Constanța |
| 26 | 1993–94 | CFR Constanța |
| 27 | 1994–95 | Electrica Voința Constanța |
| 28 | 1995–96 | Electrica Constanța |
| 29 | 1996–97 | Neptun |
Divizia D
| 30 | 1997–98 | Jandarmii Dorobanțu |
| 31 | 1998–99 | Portul Constanța |
| 32 | 1999–00 | Electrica Constanța |
| 33 | 2000–01 | Oil Terminal Constanța |
| 34 | 2001–02 | CFR Constanța |
| 35 | 2002–03 | Aurora 23 August |
| 36 | 2003–04 | Farul Constanța II |
| 37 | 2004–05 | Axiopolis Cernavodă |
| 38 | 2005–06 | Ovidiu |

| Ed. | Season | Winners |
Liga IV
| 39 | 2006–07 | Medgidia |
| 40 | 2007–08 | Eforie |
| 41 | 2008–09 | Oil Terminal Constanța |
| 42 | 2009–10 | Peștera |
| 43 | 2010–11 | Peștera |
| 44 | 2011–12 | Agigea |
| 45 | 2012–13 | Callatis Mangalia |
| 46 | 2013–14 | CFR Constanța |
| 47 | 2014–15 | Viitorul Constanța II |
| 48 | 2015–16 | Axiopolis Cernavodă |
| 49 | 2016–17 | Farul Constanța |
| 50 | 2017–18 | Medgidia |
| 51 | 2018–19 | Poseidon Limanu-2 Mai |
| 52 | 2019–20 | Gloria Albești |
| 53 | 2020–21 | Ovidiu |
| 54 | 2021–22 | Gloria Băneasa |
| 55 | 2022–23 | Axiopolis Cernavodă |
| 56 | 2023–24 | Medgidia |
| 57 | 2024–25 | Agigea |
| 58 | 2025–26 | Portul Constanța |

== See also ==
=== Main Leagues ===
- Liga I
- Liga II
- Liga III
- Liga IV

=== County Leagues (Liga IV series) ===
North–East

- Liga IV Bacău
- Liga IV Botoșani
- Liga IV Iași
- Liga IV Neamț
- Liga IV Suceava
- Liga IV Vaslui

North–West

- Liga IV Bihor
- Liga IV Bistrița-Năsăud
- Liga IV Cluj
- Liga IV Maramureș
- Liga IV Satu Mare
- Liga IV Sălaj

Center

- Liga IV Alba
- Liga IV Brașov
- Liga IV Covasna
- Liga IV Harghita
- Liga IV Mureș
- Liga IV Sibiu

West

- Liga IV Arad
- Liga IV Caraș-Severin
- Liga IV Gorj
- Liga IV Hunedoara
- Liga IV Mehedinți
- Liga IV Timiș

South–West

- Liga IV Argeș
- Liga IV Dâmbovița
- Liga IV Dolj
- Liga IV Olt
- Liga IV Teleorman
- Liga IV Vâlcea

South

- Liga IV Bucharest
- Liga IV Călărași
- Liga IV Giurgiu
- Liga IV Ialomița
- Liga IV Ilfov
- Liga IV Prahova

South–East

- Liga IV Brăila
- Liga IV Buzău
- Liga IV Constanța
- Liga IV Galați
- Liga IV Tulcea
- Liga IV Vrancea
