= Liga IV Bacău =

Fourth tier Romanian football league

- Founded: 1968
- Country: Romania
- Level on pyramid: 4
- Promotion to: Liga III
- Relegation to: Liga V Bacău
- Domestic cup: Cupa României – County phase
- Current champions: Negri (2nd title) (2025–26)
- Most championships: Letea Bacău (5 titles)
- Website: frf-ajf.ro/bacau
- Current: 2025–26 Liga IV Bacău

Liga IV Bacău is one of the regional football divisions of Liga IV, the fourth tier of the Romanian football league system, for clubs based in Bacău County, and is organized by AJF Bacău – Asociația Județeană de Fotbal (lit. 'County Football Association').

It is contested by a variable number of teams, depending on the number of teams relegated from Liga III, the number of teams promoted from Liga V Bacău, and the teams that withdraw or enter the competition. The winner may or may not be promoted to Liga III, depending on the result of a promotion play-off contested against the winner of a neighboring county series.

== History ==
In 1968, following the new administrative and territorial reorganization of the country, each county established its own football championship, integrating teams from the former regional championships as well as those that had previously competed in town and rayon level competitions. The freshly formed Bacău County Championship was placed under the authority of the newly created Consiliul Județean pentru Educație Fizică și Sport (lit. 'County Council for Physical Education and Sports') in Bacău County.

Since then, the structure and organization of Bacău’s main county competition, like those of other county championships, have undergone numerous changes. Between 1968 and 1992, it was known as Campionatul Județean (County Championship). In 1992, it was renamed Divizia C – Faza Județeană (Divizia C – County Phase), became Divizia D in 1997, and has been known as Liga IV since 2006.

== Promotion ==
The champions of each county association play against one another in a play-off to earn promotion to Liga III. Geographical criteria are taken into consideration when the play-offs are drawn. In total, there are 41 county champions plus the Bucharest municipal champion.

== List of Champions ==
=== Bacău Regional Championship ===
Ed.	Season	Winners
1	1951	Flamura Roșie Bacău
2	1952	Dinamo Bacău
3	1953	Flamura Roșie Buhuși
4	1954	Flacăra Moinești
5	1955	Avântul Piatra Neamț
6	1956	Oituz Târgu Ocna
7	1957–58	CSA Bacău
8	1958–59	Steaua Roșie Bacău
9	1959–60	Steaua Roșie Bacău
10	1960–61	Ceahlăul Piatra Neamț
11	1961–62	Textila Buhuși
12	1962–63	Chimia Onești
13	1963–64	Victoria Piatra Neamț
14	1964–65	Minerul Comănești
15	1965–66	Victoria Bacău
16	1966–67	Știința IP Bacău
17	1967–68	Știința IP Bacău

=== Bacău County Championship ===
Ed.	Season	Winners
County Championship
1	1968–69	Minerul Comănești
2	1969–70	Oituz Târgu Ocna
3	1970–71	Oituz Târgu Ocna
4	1971–72	Constructorul Onești
5	1972–73	Energia Onești
6	1973–74	Partizanul Bacău
7	1974–75	Petrolistul Dărmănești
8	1975–76	Partizanul Bacău
9	1976–77	Aripile Bacău
10	1977–78	Victoria IRA Bacău
11	1978–79	Textila Buhuși
12	1979–80	Victoria IRA Bacău
13	1980–81	Barajul TCH Bacău
14	1981–82	Proletarul Bacău
15	1982–83	Proletarul Bacău
16	1983–84	Textila Buhuși
17	1984–85	Proletarul Bacău
18	1985–86	Letea Bacău
19	1986–87	Mecon Onești
20	1987–88	Forestierul Agăș
21	1988–89	Letea Bacău
22	1989–90	Letea Bacău
23	1990–91	CPL Bacău
24	1991–92	Voința Petrobrad Asău
Divizia C – County phase
25	1992–93	Petrolul Moinești
26	1993–94	Borzești
27	1994–95	Letea Bacău
28	1995–96	Gloria Zemeș
29	1996–97	Aurora Bacău
Divizia D
30	1997–98	Gloria Zemeș
31	1998–99	Aerostar Bacău
32	1999–00	Gloria Zemeș
33	2000–01	Consart Bacău
34	2001–02	Letea Bacău
35	2002–03	Willy Bacău
36	2003–04	Pambac Bacău
37	2004–05	Willy Bacău
38	2005–06	Petrom Zemeș

Ed.	Season	Winners
Liga IV
39	2006–07	Mărgineni
40	2007–08	Moinești
41	2008–09	Mesagerul Bacău
42	2009–10	Mesagerul Bacău
43	2010–11	Căiuți
44	2011–12	Moinești
45	2012–13	Negri
46	2013–14	SC Bacău II
47	2014–15	SC Bacău II
48	2015–16	Gauss Răcăciuni
49	2016–17	Viitorul Curița
50	2017–18	Gauss Bacău
51	2018–19	CSM Bacău
52	2019–20	Viitorul Curița
53	2020–21	Dinamo Bacău
54	2021–22	Sportul Onești
55	2022–23	Viitorul Curița
56	2023–24	Sportul Onești
57	2024–25	Bârsănești
58	2025–26	Negri

== See also ==
=== Main Leagues ===
- Liga I
- Liga II
- Liga III
- Liga IV

=== County Leagues (Liga IV series) ===
North–East

- Liga IV Bacău
- Liga IV Botoșani
- Liga IV Iași
- Liga IV Neamț
- Liga IV Suceava
- Liga IV Vaslui

North–West

- Liga IV Bihor
- Liga IV Bistrița-Năsăud
- Liga IV Cluj
- Liga IV Maramureș
- Liga IV Satu Mare
- Liga IV Sălaj

Center

- Liga IV Alba
- Liga IV Brașov
- Liga IV Covasna
- Liga IV Harghita
- Liga IV Mureș
- Liga IV Sibiu

West

- Liga IV Arad
- Liga IV Caraș-Severin
- Liga IV Gorj
- Liga IV Hunedoara
- Liga IV Mehedinți
- Liga IV Timiș

South–West

- Liga IV Argeș
- Liga IV Dâmbovița
- Liga IV Dolj
- Liga IV Olt
- Liga IV Teleorman
- Liga IV Vâlcea

South

- Liga IV Bucharest
- Liga IV Călărași
- Liga IV Giurgiu
- Liga IV Ialomița
- Liga IV Ilfov
- Liga IV Prahova

South–East

- Liga IV Brăila
- Liga IV Buzău
- Liga IV Constanța
- Liga IV Galați
- Liga IV Tulcea
- Liga IV Vrancea
