= Liga IV Iași =

Fourth tier Romanian football league

- Founded: 1968
- Country: Romania
- Level on pyramid: 4
- Promotion to: Liga III
- Relegation to: Liga V Iași
- Domestic cup: Cupa României – County phase
- Current champions: Pașcani (1st title) (2025–26)
- Most championships: Rapid Dumești (6 titles)
- Website: frf-ajf.ro/iasi
- Current: 2025–26 Liga IV Iași

Liga IV Iași is one of the regional football divisions of Liga IV, the fourth tier of the Romanian football league system, for clubs based in Iași County, and is organized by AJF Iași – Asociația Județeană de Fotbal (lit. 'County Football Association').

It is contested by a variable number of teams, depending on the number of teams relegated from Liga III, the number of teams promoted from Liga V Iași, and the teams that withdraw or enter the competition. The winner may or may not be promoted to Liga III, depending on the result of a promotion play-off contested against the winner of a neighboring county series.

== History ==
In 1968, following the new administrative and territorial reorganization of the country, each county established its own football championship, integrating teams from the former regional championships as well as those that had previously competed in town and rayon level competitions. The freshly formed Iași County Championship was placed under the authority of the newly created Consiliul Județean pentru Educație Fizică și Sport (lit. 'County Council for Physical Education and Sports') in Iași County.

Since then, the structure and organization of Liga IV Iași, like those of other county championships, have undergone numerous changes. Between 1968 and 1992, the main county competition was known as the Campionatul Județean (County Championship). Between 1992 and 1997, it was renamed Divizia C – Faza Județeană (Divizia C – County Phase), followed by Divizia D starting in 1997, and since 2006, it has been known as Liga IV.

== Promotion ==
The champions of each county association play against one another in a play-off to earn promotion to Liga III. Geographical criteria are taken into consideration when the play-offs are drawn. In total, there are 41 county champions plus the Bucharest municipal champion.

== List of Champions ==
=== Iași Regional Championship ===
Ed.	Season	Winners
1	1951	Dinamo Iași
2	1952	Locomotiva Pașcani
3	1953	Locomotiva Pașcani
4	1954	Flamura Roșie Iași
5	1955	
6	1956	Energia Metalul Bârlad
7	1957–58	Constructorul Iași
8	1958–59	Progresul Vaslui
9	1959–60	Penicilina Iași
10	1960–61	Penicilina Iași
11	1961–62	Moldova Iași
12	1962–63	Rulmentul Bârlad
13	1963–64	Constructorul Iași
14	1964–65	Unirea Negrești
15	1965–66	Gloria Bârlad
16	1966–67	Medicina Iași
17	1967–68	Foresta Ciurea (Series I); Unirea Negrești (Series II)

=== Iași County Championship ===
Ed.	Season	Winners
County Championship
1	1968–69	ITI Iași
2	1969–70	ITA Pașcani
3	1970–71	Constructorul Iași
4	1971–72	Terom Iași
5	1972–73	Constructorul Iași
6	1973–74	Șoimii Iași
7	1974–75	Spicul Țigănași
8	1975–76	Nicolina Iași
9	1976–77	Viitorul Hârlău
10	1977–78	Recolta Ruginoasa
11	1978–79	ASA Iași
12	1979–80	Tepro Iași
13	1980–81	Integrata Pașcani
14	1981–82	Tehnoton Iași
15	1982–83	Voința Lețcani
16	1983–84	Tepro Iași
17	1984–85	Fortus Iași
18	1985–86	Tepro Iași
19	1986–87	Aurora Târgu Frumos
20	1987–88	Fortus Iași
21	1988–89	Tepro Iași
22	1989–90	Loctrans Iași
23	1990–91	Tepro Iași
24	1991–92	Metalul Podu Iloaiei
Divizia C – County phase
25	1992–93	CFR Tepro Iași
26	1993–94	Mobila Iași
27	1994–95	Foresta Ciurea
28	1995–96	Viitorul 94 Hârlău
29	1996–97	Fortus Iași
Divizia D
30	1997–98	RATC Iași
31	1998–99	CFR Citadin Iași
32	1999–00	Viitorul Pașcani
33	2000–01	RATC Iași
34	2001–02	Viitorul 94 Hârlău
35	2002–03	Mobila Iași
36	2003–04	Poli Unirea Iași II
37	2004–05	Viitorul Târgu Frumos
38	2005–06	Spicul Țigănași

Ed.	Season	Winners
Liga IV
39	2006–07	Iris Iași
40	2007–08	Iris Iași
41	2008–09	Rapid Dumești
42	2009–10	Rapid Dumești
43	2010–11	Rapid Dumești
44	2011–12	Rapid Dumești
45	2012–13	Rapid Dumești
46	2013–14	Rapid Dumești
47	2014–15	Unirea Mircești
48	2015–16	Siretul Lespezi
49	2016–17	Unirea Mircești
50	2017–18	Victoria Lețcani
51	2018–19	Moldova Cristești
52	2019–20	Unirea Mircești
–	2020–21	Not disputed (Note: Not disputed due to COVID-19 pandemic in Romania.)
53	2021–22	Flacăra Erbiceni
54	2022–23	Moldova Cristești
55	2023–24	USV Iași
56	2024–25	Moldova Cristești
57	2025–26	Pașcani

== See also ==
=== Main Leagues ===
- Liga I
- Liga II
- Liga III
- Liga IV

=== County Leagues (Liga IV series) ===
North–East

- Liga IV Bacău
- Liga IV Botoșani
- Liga IV Iași
- Liga IV Neamț
- Liga IV Suceava
- Liga IV Vaslui

North–West

- Liga IV Bihor
- Liga IV Bistrița-Năsăud
- Liga IV Cluj
- Liga IV Maramureș
- Liga IV Satu Mare
- Liga IV Sălaj

Center

- Liga IV Alba
- Liga IV Brașov
- Liga IV Covasna
- Liga IV Harghita
- Liga IV Mureș
- Liga IV Sibiu

West

- Liga IV Arad
- Liga IV Caraș-Severin
- Liga IV Gorj
- Liga IV Hunedoara
- Liga IV Mehedinți
- Liga IV Timiș

South–West

- Liga IV Argeș
- Liga IV Dâmbovița
- Liga IV Dolj
- Liga IV Olt
- Liga IV Teleorman
- Liga IV Vâlcea

South

- Liga IV Bucharest
- Liga IV Călărași
- Liga IV Giurgiu
- Liga IV Ialomița
- Liga IV Ilfov
- Liga IV Prahova

South–East

- Liga IV Brăila
- Liga IV Buzău
- Liga IV Constanța
- Liga IV Galați
- Liga IV Tulcea
- Liga IV Vrancea
