= Liga IV Timiș =

Fourth tier Romanian football league

- Founded: 1968
- Country: Romania
- Level on pyramid: 4
- Promotion to: Liga III
- Relegation to: Liga V Timiș
- Domestic cup: Cupa României – County phase
- Current champions: Sânandrei Carani (1st title) (2025–26)
- Most championships: Auto Timișoara (5 titles)
- Website: frf-ajf.ro/timis
- Current: 2025–26 Liga IV Timiș

Liga IV Timiș is one of the regional football divisions of Liga IV, the fourth tier of the Romanian football league system, for clubs based in Timiș County, and is organized by AJF Timiș – Asociația Județeană de Fotbal (lit. 'County Football Association').

It is contested by a variable number of teams, depending on the number of teams relegated from Liga III, the number of teams promoted from Liga V Timiș, and the teams that withdraw or enter the competition. The winner may or may not be promoted to Liga III, depending on the result of a promotion play-off contested against the winner of a neighboring county series.

== History ==
In 1968, following the new administrative and territorial reorganization of the country, each county established its own football championship, integrating teams from the former regional championships, as well as those that had previously competed in town and rayon level competitions. The freshly formed Timiș County Championship was placed under the authority of the newly created Consiliul Județean pentru Educație Fizică și Sport (lit. 'County Council for Physical Education and Sports') in Timiș County.

Since then, the structure and organization of Liga IV Timiș, as with many other county championships, have undergone numerous changes. Between 1968 and 1992, the main county competition was known as the County Championship. From 1992 to 1997, it was renamed Divizia C – County Phase, followed by Divizia D starting in 1997, and since 2006 it has been known as Liga IV.

== Promotion ==
Since then, the structure and organization of Liga IV Tulcea, like those of other county championships, have undergone numerous changes. Between 1968 and 1992, the main county competition was known as the Campionatul Județean (County Championship). Between 1992 and 1997, it was renamed Divizia C – Faza Județeană (Divizia C – County Phase), followed by Divizia D starting in 1997, and since 2006, it has been known as Liga IV.

== List of champions ==
=== Banat Regional Championship ===
Ed.	Season	Winners
Timișoara Regional Championship
1	1951	Metalul Timișoara
2	1952	Șantierul Lugoj
3	1953	Progresul Timișoara
4	1954	Metalul Oțelul Roșu
5	1955	
6	1956	Energia Reșița
7	1957–58	Metalul Bocșa Română
8	1958–59	
9	1959–60	Minerul Oravița
Banat Regional Championship
10	1960–61	CFR Arad
11	1961–62	Ceramica Jimbolia
12	1962–63	Electromotor Timișoara
13	1963–64	Minerul Anina
14	1964–65	CFR Caransebeș
15	1965–66	Metalul Oțelul Roșu
16	1966–67	UM Timișoara
17	1967–68	Șoimii Timișoara (North Series); Minerul Bocșa Montană (South Series)

=== Timiș County Championship ===
Ed.	Season	Winners
County Championship
1	1968–69	Electromotor Timișoara
2	1969–70	Șoimii Timișoara
3	1970–71	Progresul Timișoara
4	1971–72	Unirea Tomnatic
5	1972–73	Unirea Sânnicolau Mare
6	1973–74	Ceramica Jimbolia
7	1974–75	Constructorul Timișoara
8	1975–76	Laminorul Nădrag
9	1976–77	Dinamo Timișoara
10	1977–78	ICRAL Timișoara
11	1978–79	Textila Timișoara
12	1979–80	Textila Timișoara
13	1980–81	Constructorul Timișoara
14	1981–82	Auto Timișoara
15	1982–83	Auto Timișoara
16	1983–84	Obilici Sânmartinu Sârbesc
17	1984–85	Auto Timișoara
18	1985–86	Progresul Timișoara
19	1986–87	Auto Vulcan Timișoara
20	1987–88	Progresul Gătaia
21	1988–89	Ceramica Jimbolia
22	1989–90	Electromotor Timișoara
23	1990–91	Auto FZB Timișoara
24	1991–92	Venus Lugoj
Divizia C – County phase
25	1992–93	Electrica Timișoara
26	1993–94	Dacia Timișoara
27	1994–95	Furnirul Deta
28	1995–96	Electrica Timișoara
29	1996–97	Recaș
Divizia D
30	1997–98	Obilici Sânmartinu Sârbesc
31	1998–99	Telecom Timișoara
32	1999–00	Politehnica Timișoara
33	2000–01	CFR Timișoara
34	2001–02	CFR Timișoara
35	2002–03	CFR Timișoara
36	2003–04	Jimbolia
37	2004–05	Calor Timișoara
38	2005–06	Timișul Albina

Ed.	Season	Winners
Liga IV
39	2006–07	Nuova Mama Mia Becicherecu Mic
40	2007–08	Progresul Gătaia
41	2008–09	Recaș
42	2009–10	Chișoda
43	2010–11	Flacăra Făget
44	2011–12	Lugoj
45	2012–13	Nuova Mama Mia Becicherecu Mic
46	2013–14	Ghiroda
47	2014–15	Politehnica Timișoara
48	2015–16	Ripensia Timișoara
49	2016–17	Ghiroda
50	2017–18	Dumbrăvița
51	2018–19	Fortuna Becicherecu Mic
52	2019–20	Avântul Periam
53	2020–21	Pobeda Stár Bišnov
54	2021–22	Phoenix Buziaș
55	2022–23	Peciu Nou
56	2023–24	Timișul Șag
57	2024–25	Lugoj
58	2025–26	Sânandrei Carani

== See also ==
=== Main Leagues ===
- Liga I
- Liga II
- Liga III
- Liga IV

=== County Leagues (Liga IV series) ===
North–East

- Liga IV Bacău
- Liga IV Botoșani
- Liga IV Iași
- Liga IV Neamț
- Liga IV Suceava
- Liga IV Vaslui

North–West

- Liga IV Bihor
- Liga IV Bistrița-Năsăud
- Liga IV Cluj
- Liga IV Maramureș
- Liga IV Satu Mare
- Liga IV Sălaj

Center

- Liga IV Alba
- Liga IV Brașov
- Liga IV Covasna
- Liga IV Harghita
- Liga IV Mureș
- Liga IV Sibiu

West

- Liga IV Arad
- Liga IV Caraș-Severin
- Liga IV Gorj
- Liga IV Hunedoara
- Liga IV Mehedinți
- Liga IV Timiș

South–West

- Liga IV Argeș
- Liga IV Dâmbovița
- Liga IV Dolj
- Liga IV Olt
- Liga IV Teleorman
- Liga IV Vâlcea

South

- Liga IV Bucharest
- Liga IV Călărași
- Liga IV Giurgiu
- Liga IV Ialomița
- Liga IV Ilfov
- Liga IV Prahova

South–East

- Liga IV Brăila
- Liga IV Buzău
- Liga IV Constanța
- Liga IV Galați
- Liga IV Tulcea
- Liga IV Vrancea
