= AS Recaș =

Romanian football club

- Full name: Asociația Sportivă Recaș
- Nickname: Viticultorii (The Wine Growers)
- Short name: Recaș
- Founded: 1917; 109 years ago 2001; 25 years ago (refounded); 2013; 13 years ago (refounded)
- Ground: Atletic
- Capacity: 2,500
- Owner: Recaș Town
- Chairman: Ghiță Gheorghe
- Manager: Sorin Micșa
- League: Liga IV
- 2025–26: Liga IV, Timiș County, 14th of 16
Home colours	Away colours

Asociația Sportivă Recaș, commonly known as AS Recaș, or simply as Recaș, is a Romanian football club based in Recaș, Timiș County, which competes in the Liga V. The original club was founded 1917, then re-established in 2001 and once again in 2013.

== History ==
The club was founded in 1917. It played its entire history in the lower county leagues of Romanian football until the summer of 2009.

At the end of the 2008–09 season it finished 1st in the Timiș County Championship and participated at the play-off for the promotion to the Liga III. It was drawn against Partizan Satu Mare, the champion of the Arad County Championship, whom they beat, 7–0, and promoted for the very first time in history to the Liga III.

ACS finished the first half of the championship 1st in the table, surpassing all expectations and having a great chance to promote to the Liga II. The pressure got to them and they finished 3rd in the 2009–10 Liga III season.

The following season they moved up one place and finished 2nd, once again missing the promotion.

At the end of the 2011–12 Liga III season ACS Recaș finished 1st in the series and gained promotion for the very first time in their history to the Liga II, after 95 years of existence.

In the summer of 2012 the club was moved to Timișoara in order to establish a new football club, ACS Poli Timișoara after the dissolution of FC Politehnica Timișoara. After this move the club will continue Poli Timișoara's history thus ending its own, after 95 years of existence and a premiere promotion to the Liga II.

In the summer of 2013, the football club of Recaș was re-established, for the third time, now as AS Recaș.

== Honours ==
Liga III:

- Winners (1): 2011–12
- Runners-up (1): 2010–11

Liga IV – Timiș County

- Winners (2): 1996–97, 2008–09
- Runners-up (1): 1995–96

Liga V – Timiș County

- Winners (2): 1994–95, 2023–24
