= 2016–17 Liga IV =

75th season of the Liga IV, the fourth tier of the Romanian football league

Liga IV
- Season: 2016–17

The 2016–17 Liga IV was the 75th season of Liga IV and the 49th since the 1968 administrative and territorial reorganization of the country, representing the fourth tier of the Romanian football league system. The champions of each county association played against one from a neighbouring county in a play-off for promotion to Liga III.

== County leagues ==
- Alba (AB)
- Arad (AR)
- Argeș (AG)
- Bacău (BC)
- Bihor (BH)
- Bistrița-Năsăud (BN)
- Botoșani (BT)
- Brașov (BV)
- Brăila (BR)
- Bucharest (B)
- Buzău (BZ)
- Caraș-Severin (CS)
- Călărași (CL)
- Cluj (CJ)
- Constanța (CT)
- Covasna (CV)
- Dâmbovița (DB)
- Dolj (DJ)
- Galați (GL)
- Giurgiu (GR)
- Gorj (GJ)
- Harghita (HR)
- Hunedoara (HD)
- Ialomița (IL)
- Iași (IS)
- Ilfov (IF)
- Maramureș (MM)
- Mehedinți (MH)
- Mureș (MS)
- Neamț (NT)
- Olt (OT)
- Prahova (PH)
- Satu Mare (SM)
- Sălaj (SJ)
- Sibiu (SB)
- Suceava (SV)
- Teleorman (TR)
- Timiș (TM)
- Tulcea (TL)
- Vaslui (VS)
- Vâlcea (VL)
- Vrancea (VN)

== Promotion play-off ==
The matches were played on 17 and 24 June 2017.

| Team 1 | Agg. | Team 2 | 1st leg | 2nd leg |
|---|---|---|---|---|
| Strehaia (MH) | 2–12 | (TR) Voința Saelele | 2–4 | 0–8 |
| Pescărușul Sarichioi (TL) | 2–8 | (CT) Farul Constanța | 2–7 | 0–1 |
| Dentaș Tărtășești (DB) | 2–5 | (PH) Petrolul Ploiești | 0–3 | 2–2 |
| Alb-Negru al Studenților Clujeni (CJ) | 14–0 | (MM) Lăpușul Târgu Lăpuș | 8–0 | 6–0 |
| Diosig (BH) | 1–7 | (AR) Șoimii Lipova | 1–6 | 0–1 |
| Avrig (SB) | 4–1 | (AG) Unirea Bascov | 1–0 | 3–1 |
| Progresul Spartac București (B) | 6–5 | (IF) Voința Crevedia | 0–3 (w/o) | 6–2 |
| Mureșul Rușii Munți (MS) | 2–4 | (BV) Viitorul Ghimbav | 0–2 | 2–2 |
| Amara (IL) | 2–9 | (BZ) Metalul Buzău | 0–4 | 2–5 |
| Dunărea Giurgiu (GR) | 2–3 | (CL) Agricola Borcea | 2–2 | 0–1 |
| Pro Mureșul Toplița (HR) | 0–9 | (CV) KSE Târgu Secuiesc | 0–3 | 0–6 |
| Internațional Bălești (GJ) | 5–2 | (DJ) Tractorul Cetate | 2–1 | 3–1 |
| Viitorul Dăești (VL) | 0–2 | (OT) Milcov | 0–0 | 0–2 |
| Unirea Tășnad (SM) | 5–2 | (SJ) Dumbrava Gâlgău Almașului | 2–1 | 3–1 |
| Dumitra (BN) | 1–2 | (SV) Bucovina Rădăuți | 0–0 | 1–2 |
| Sănătatea Darabani (BT) | 5–3 | (BC) Viitorul Curița | 1–0 | 4–3 |
| Victoria Traian (BR) | 7–1 | (VS) Gârceni | 4–0 | 3–1 |
| Unirea Mircești (IS) | 1–2 | (GL) Oțelul Galați | 1–0 | 0–2 |
| Teiul Poiana Teiului (NT) | 3–5 | (VN) Focșani | 1–2 | 2–3 |
| Viitorul Caransebeș (CS) | 2–5 | (AB) Șurianu Sebeș | 1–2 | 1–3 |
| Inter Petrila (HD) | 2–5 | (TM) Ghiroda | 1–2 | 1–3 |

== League standings ==
=== Alba County ===
Team changes from the previous season

- Mureșul Vințu de Jos achieved promotion to Liga III.
- Fortuna Lunca Mureșului (Series II winners) and Sportul Petrești (Series III winners) were promoted from Liga V Alba.
- Industria Galda II (Series I winners) declined promotion from Liga V Alba.
- Cuprirom Abrud (16th place) was relegated to Liga V Alba.
- Euro Șpring and ASC Pianu 2013 withdrew.
- Energia Săsciori (14th place) and Gaz Metan Valea Lungă (14th place) were spared from relegation.
- Transalpina Șugag was admitted upon request.
- Unirea Alba Iulia was admitted upon request to Liga III.

| Pos | Team | Pld | W | D | L | GF | GA | GD | Pts | Qualification or relegation |
|---|---|---|---|---|---|---|---|---|---|---|
| 1 | Șurianu Sebeș (C, Q) | 26 | 23 | 2 | 1 | 101 | 13 | +88 | 71 | Qualification to promotion play-off |
| 2 | Ocna Mureș | 26 | 18 | 3 | 5 | 63 | 23 | +40 | 57 | |
| 3 | Viitorul Spicul Daia Romană | 26 | 16 | 6 | 4 | 54 | 25 | +29 | 54 | |
| 4 | Transalpina Șugag | 26 | 15 | 6 | 5 | 72 | 31 | +41 | 51 | |
| 5 | Sportul Petrești | 26 | 14 | 4 | 8 | 50 | 33 | +17 | 46 | |
| 6 | CIL Blaj | 26 | 13 | 6 | 7 | 54 | 22 | +32 | 45 | |
| 7 | Viitorul Sântimbru | 26 | 12 | 3 | 11 | 49 | 36 | +13 | 39 | |
| 8 | Inter Ciugud | 26 | 10 | 5 | 11 | 50 | 49 | +1 | 35 | |
| 9 | Olimpia Aiud | 26 | 9 | 6 | 11 | 47 | 58 | −11 | 33 | |
| 10 | Dalia Sport Daia Romană | 26 | 8 | 5 | 13 | 32 | 53 | −21 | 29 | |
| 11 | Energia Săsciori | 26 | 7 | 5 | 14 | 40 | 55 | −15 | 26 | |
| 12 | Rapid CFR Teiuș | 26 | 3 | 6 | 17 | 21 | 80 | −59 | 15 | |
| 13 | Fortuna Lunca Mureșului (R) | 26 | 2 | 5 | 19 | 32 | 93 | −61 | 11 | Relegation to Liga V Alba |
| 14 | Gaz Metan Valea Lungă (R) | 26 | 1 | 0 | 25 | 14 | 108 | −94 | 3 | Relegation to Liga V Alba |

Rules for classification: 1) Points; 2) Head-to-head points; 3) Head-to-head goal difference; 4) Head-to-head goals scored; 5) Head-to-head away goals scored; 6) Goal difference; 7) Goals scored.
(C) Champions; (Q) Qualified for the phase indicated; (R) Relegated

=== Arad County ===
Team changes from the previous season

- Gloria Lunca-Teuz Cermei achieved promotion to Liga III.
- CS Dorobanți (Series I winners), Vulturii Socodor (Series II winners) and Cetate Săvârșin (Series I runners-up) were promoted from Liga V Arad.
- Viitorul Șepreuș (Series II runners-up) declined promotion from Liga V Arad.
- Aqua Vest Arad (13th place) was relegated to Liga V Arad.
- Șoimii Șimand (14th place) was spared from relegation.
- Vulturii Socodor was renamed ACS Socodor.
- CS Ineu withdrew from Liga III and was admitted upon request in Liga IV Arad.
- UTA Arad II was admitted upon request to Liga III and was replaced by UTA Arad III.

| Pos | Team | Pld | W | D | L | GF | GA | GD | Pts | Qualification or relegation |
|---|---|---|---|---|---|---|---|---|---|---|
| 1 | Șoimii Lipova (C, Q) | 30 | 28 | 1 | 1 | 118 | 17 | +101 | 85 (Note: Șoimii Lipova–Crișul Chișineu-Criș 0–1; Crișul Chișineu-Criș–Șoimii Lipova 0–2) | Qualification to promotion play-off |
| 2 | Crișul Chișineu-Criș | 30 | 28 | 1 | 1 | 105 | 12 | +93 | 85 | |
| 3 | Frontiera Curtici | 30 | 21 | 1 | 8 | 92 | 40 | +52 | 64 | |
| 4 | Progresul Pecica | 30 | 19 | 6 | 5 | 89 | 42 | +47 | 63 | |
| 5 | Unirea Sântana | 30 | 20 | 0 | 10 | 86 | 50 | +36 | 60 | |
| 6 | Victoria Felnac | 30 | 14 | 4 | 12 | 55 | 44 | +11 | 46 (Note: Victoria Felnac–Victoria Zăbrani 2–0; Victoria Zăbrani–Victoria Felnac 3–2) | |
| 7 | Victoria Zăbrani | 30 | 13 | 7 | 10 | 51 | 48 | +3 | 46 | |
| 8 | Șoimii Șimand | 30 | 12 | 3 | 15 | 70 | 76 | −6 | 39 | |
| 9 | Păulișana Păuliș | 30 | 11 | 5 | 14 | 55 | 64 | −9 | 38 | |
| 10 | Socodor | 30 | 9 | 2 | 19 | 45 | 80 | −35 | 29 (Note: Socodor–Glogovăț 4–0; Glogovăț–Socodor 1–0) | |
| 11 | Glogovăț | 30 | 9 | 2 | 19 | 34 | 92 | −58 | 29 | |
| 12 | Cetate Săvârșin | 30 | 9 | 1 | 20 | 60 | 108 | −48 | 28 | |
| 13 | Voința Mailat | 30 | 7 | 6 | 17 | 45 | 72 | −27 | 27 | |
| 14 | Ineu | 30 | 7 | 3 | 20 | 47 | 93 | −46 | 24 | |
| 15 | UTA Arad III (R) | 30 | 5 | 5 | 20 | 39 | 88 | −49 | 20 | Relegation to Liga V Arad |
| 16 | Dorobanți (R) | 30 | 2 | 5 | 23 | 39 | 104 | −65 | 11 | Relegation to Liga V Arad |

Rules for classification: 1) Points; 2) Head-to-head points; 3) Head-to-head goal difference; 4) Head-to-head goals scored; 5) Head-to-head away goals scored; 6) Goal difference; 7) Goals scored.
(C) Champions; (Q) Qualified for the phase indicated; (R) Relegated

=== Argeș County ===
Team changes from the previous season

- Argeș 1953 Pitești achieved promotion to Liga III.
- CS Mioveni II was admitted upon request to Liga III.
- ACS Poiana Lacului (Center II Series winners) and Young Boys Slobozia (South Series winners) were promoted from Liga V Argeș.
- AS Băiculești (Center II Series winners) and Vulturii Vulturești (North Series winners) declined promotion from Liga V Argeș.
- CS Rucăr (11th place) and Viitorul Ștefănești (12th place) were spared from relegation.
- Atletic Bradu II, CS Albota, Steaua Roșie Slobozia and Basarabi Curtea de Argeș were admitted upon request.

| Pos | Team | Pld | W | D | L | GF | GA | GD | Pts | Qualification or relegation |
|---|---|---|---|---|---|---|---|---|---|---|
| 1 | Unirea Bascov (C, Q) | 30 | 29 | 1 | 0 | 150 | 22 | +128 | 88 | Qualification to promotion play-off |
| 2 | Atletic Bradu II | 30 | 20 | 2 | 8 | 96 | 65 | +31 | 62 | |
| 3 | Viitorul Ștefănești | 30 | 20 | 1 | 9 | 97 | 51 | +46 | 61 | |
| 4 | Victoria Buzoiești | 30 | 17 | 5 | 8 | 80 | 45 | +35 | 56 | |
| 5 | Albota | 30 | 17 | 3 | 10 | 106 | 80 | +26 | 54 (Note: Albota–Vulturii Priboieni 1–1; Vulturii Priboieni–Albota 2–4) | |
| 6 | Vulturii Priboieni | 30 | 16 | 6 | 8 | 93 | 80 | +13 | 54 | |
| 7 | Poiana Lacului | 30 | 16 | 4 | 10 | 90 | 65 | +25 | 52 | |
| 8 | Gloria Berevoești | 30 | 16 | 3 | 11 | 80 | 63 | +17 | 51 (Note: Sporting Pitești–Gloria Berevoești 4–0; Gloria Berevoești–Sporting Pitești 6–1) | |
| 9 | Sporting Pitești | 30 | 15 | 6 | 9 | 86 | 46 | +40 | 51 | |
| 10 | Steaua Roșie Slobozia | 30 | 11 | 4 | 15 | 76 | 71 | +5 | 37 | |
| 11 | Basarabi Curtea de Argeș | 30 | 11 | 2 | 17 | 79 | 81 | −2 | 35 | |
| 12 | DLR Pitești | 30 | 9 | 3 | 18 | 71 | 99 | −28 | 30 | |
| 13 | Rucăr | 30 | 6 | 2 | 22 | 63 | 126 | −63 | 20 (Note: Rucăr–Young Boys Slobozia 1–2; Young Boys Slobozia–Rucăr 0–3) | |
| 14 | Young Boys Slobozia (Note: Young Boys Slobozia was excluded from championship after 17 rounds and lost all the remaining matches with 0–3.) (R) | 30 | 6 | 2 | 22 | 30 | 77 | −47 | 20 | Relegation to Liga V Argeș |
| 15 | Olimpia Suseni (R) | 30 | 6 | 0 | 24 | 47 | 149 | −102 | 18 | Relegation to Liga V Argeș |
| 16 | Micești (R) | 30 | 2 | 2 | 26 | 41 | 165 | −124 | 8 | Relegation to Liga V Argeș |

Rules for classification: 1) Points; 2) Head-to-head points; 3) Head-to-head goal difference; 4) Head-to-head goals scored; 5) Head-to-head away goals scored; 6) Goal difference; 7) Goals scored.
(C) Champions; (Q) Qualified for the phase indicated; (R) Relegated

=== Bacău County ===
Team changes from the previous season

- Aripile Cleja (runners-up) was promoted from Liga V Bacău.
- Uzu Dărmănești (winners) declined promotion from Liga V Bacău.
- Viva Activ Buhuși (18th place; excluded) was relegated to Liga V Bacău.
- Gauss Răcăciuni and AS Tescani withdrew.
- AS Târgu Ocna and Flamura Roșie Sascut were spared from relegation.

| Pos | Team | Pld | W | D | L | GF | GA | GD | Pts | Qualification or relegation |
|---|---|---|---|---|---|---|---|---|---|---|
| 1 | Viitorul Curița (C, Q) | 30 | 26 | 2 | 2 | 126 | 27 | +99 | 80 | Qualification to promotion play-off |
| 2 | Voința Oituz | 30 | 21 | 5 | 4 | 83 | 29 | +54 | 68 | |
| 3 | Viitorul Nicolae Bălcescu | 30 | 20 | 5 | 5 | 101 | 44 | +57 | 65 | |
| 4 | Vulturul Măgirești | 30 | 20 | 4 | 6 | 121 | 49 | +72 | 64 (Note: Vulturul Măgirești–Voința Gârleni 3–0; Voința Gârleni–Vulturul Măgirești 4–3) | |
| 5 | Voința Gârleni | 30 | 20 | 4 | 6 | 99 | 44 | +55 | 64 | |
| 6 | Filipești | 30 | 18 | 3 | 9 | 88 | 58 | +30 | 57 | |
| 7 | Dofteana | 30 | 16 | 4 | 10 | 74 | 57 | +17 | 52 | |
| 8 | Biruința Letea Veche Bacău | 30 | 12 | 4 | 14 | 62 | 72 | −10 | 40 | |
| 9 | Moinești | 30 | 10 | 6 | 14 | 63 | 74 | −11 | 36 | |
| 10 | Negri | 30 | 9 | 6 | 15 | 60 | 73 | −13 | 33 | |
| 11 | Aripile Cleja | 30 | 9 | 3 | 18 | 61 | 101 | −40 | 30 | |
| 12 | Siretul Bacău | 30 | 8 | 5 | 17 | 66 | 78 | −12 | 29 | |
| 13 | Măgura Cașin | 30 | 8 | 3 | 19 | 52 | 94 | −42 | 27 | |
| 14 | Gloria Zemeș | 30 | 7 | 2 | 21 | 59 | 117 | −58 | 23 | |
| 15 | Târgu Ocna (R) | 30 | 4 | 0 | 26 | 46 | 136 | −90 | 12 | Relegation to Liga V Bacău |
| 16 | Flamura Roșie Sascut (R) | 30 | 3 | 2 | 25 | 26 | 134 | −108 | 11 | Relegation to Liga V Bacău |

Rules for classification: 1) Points; 2) Head-to-head points; 3) Head-to-head goal difference; 4) Head-to-head goals scored; 5) Head-to-head away goals scored; 6) Goal difference; 7) Goals scored.
(C) Champions; (Q) Qualified for the phase indicated; (R) Relegated

=== Bihor County ===
Team changes from the previous season

- FC Paleu (Series I winners) Padișul Bihorul Gurani (Series II winners), CS Oșorhei II (Series I runners-up) and Unirea Livada (Series II runners-up) were promoted from Liga V Bihor.
- Victoria Avram Iancu (14th place), Partium Oradea (15th place; excluded) and Bihor Oradea II (16th place; excluded) were relegated to Liga V Bihor.
- FC Hidișelu de Sus and Viitorul Marghita withdrew.
- CSC Sânmartin was admitted upon request.

| Pos | Team | Pld | W | D | L | GF | GA | GD | Pts | Qualification or relegation |
|---|---|---|---|---|---|---|---|---|---|---|
| 1 | Diosig (C, Q) | 28 | 22 | 3 | 3 | 94 | 32 | +62 | 69 | Qualification for promotion play-off |
| 2 | Bihorul Beiuș | 28 | 20 | 6 | 2 | 72 | 24 | +48 | 66 | |
| 3 | Universitatea Oradea | 28 | 19 | 3 | 6 | 82 | 35 | +47 | 60 | |
| 4 | Crișul Sântandrei | 28 | 17 | 4 | 7 | 90 | 45 | +45 | 55 | |
| 5 | Unirea Valea lui Mihai | 28 | 17 | 2 | 9 | 54 | 32 | +22 | 53 | |
| 6 | Unirea Livada | 28 | 15 | 5 | 8 | 62 | 53 | +9 | 50 | |
| 7 | Viitorul Borș | 28 | 11 | 4 | 13 | 62 | 58 | +4 | 37 (Note: Viitorul Borș–Mădăras 7–1; Mădăras–Viitorul Borș 2–1) | |
| 8 | Mădăras | 28 | 11 | 4 | 13 | 60 | 71 | −11 | 37 | |
| 9 | Crișul Aleșd | 28 | 11 | 3 | 14 | 50 | 48 | +2 | 36 (Note: Crișul Aleșd–Ștei 2–0; Ștei–Crișul Aleșd 2–1) | |
| 10 | Ștei | 28 | 8 | 12 | 8 | 41 | 47 | −6 | 36 | |
| 11 | Oșorhei II | 28 | 9 | 7 | 12 | 41 | 62 | −21 | 34 | |
| 12 | Sânmartin | 28 | 7 | 7 | 14 | 44 | 61 | −17 | 28 | |
| 13 | Olimpia Salonta | 28 | 5 | 4 | 19 | 33 | 61 | −28 | 19 | |
| 14 | Paleu (R) | 27 | 2 | 4 | 21 | 15 | 60 | −45 | 10 (Note: Paleu withdrew during the winter break and lost all the matches from the second part of the season with 0–3.) | Relegation to Liga V Bihor |
| 15 | Padișul Bihorul Gurani (R) | 27 | 0 | 2 | 25 | 12 | 123 | −111 | 2 (Note: Padișul Bihorul Gurani was excluded in the second part of the season and lost all the remaining matches with 0–3.) | Relegation to Liga V Bihor |
| 16 | Locadin Țețchea (R) | 0 | 0 | 0 | 0 | 0 | 0 | 0 | 0 (Note: Locadin Țețchea was excluded in the first part of the season and all its results were canceled.) | Excluded |

Rules for classification: Rules for classification: 1) Points 2) Head-to-head points; 3) Head-to-head goal difference; 4) Head-to-head goals scored; 5) Head-to-head away goals scored; 6) Goal difference; 7) Goals scored.
(C) Champions; (Q) Qualified for the phase indicated; (R) Relegated

=== Bistrița-Năsăud County ===
Team changes from the previous season

- FC Bistrița achieved promotion to Liga III.
- Hebe Sângeorz-Băi (Series I winners) Academia Gloria Bistrița (Series II winners) and Minerul Rodna (Series I runners-up) were promoted from Liga V Bistrița-Năsăud.
- Victoria Uriu (Series II runners-up) was promoted from Liga V Bistrița-Năsăud but withdrew before the start of the season.
- Progresul Tăure (13th place ) was spared from relegation.

| Pos | Team | Pld | W | D | L | GF | GA | GD | Pts | Qualification or relegation |
|---|---|---|---|---|---|---|---|---|---|---|
| 1 | Dumitra (C, Q) | 28 | 23 | 3 | 2 | 127 | 36 | +91 | 72 | Qualification to promotion play-off |
| 2 | Voința Cetate | 28 | 19 | 5 | 4 | 136 | 48 | +88 | 62 | |
| 3 | Minerul Rodna | 28 | 18 | 4 | 6 | 84 | 46 | +38 | 58 | |
| 4 | Voința Livezile | 28 | 17 | 5 | 6 | 95 | 40 | +55 | 56 | |
| 5 | Atletico Monor | 28 | 16 | 5 | 7 | 83 | 40 | +43 | 53 | |
| 6 | Academia Gloria Bistrița | 28 | 16 | 3 | 9 | 99 | 40 | +59 | 51 | |
| 7 | Heniu Leșu | 28 | 14 | 5 | 9 | 66 | 46 | +20 | 47 | |
| 8 | Spicul Salva | 28 | 14 | 5 | 9 | 65 | 74 | −9 | 47 | |
| 9 | Progresul Năsăud | 28 | 12 | 5 | 11 | 79 | 60 | +19 | 41 | |
| 10 | Hebe Sângeorz-Băi | 28 | 8 | 3 | 17 | 43 | 88 | −45 | 27 | |
| 11 | Luceafarul Șieu | 28 | 8 | 3 | 17 | 46 | 99 | −53 | 27 | |
| 12 | Silvicultorul Maieru | 28 | 7 | 2 | 19 | 42 | 96 | −54 | 23 | |
| 13 | Eciro Forest Telciu | 28 | 6 | 3 | 19 | 40 | 101 | −61 | 21 | |
| 14 | Progresul Tăure (R) | 28 | 4 | 2 | 22 | 35 | 124 | −89 | 14 | Relegation to Liga V Bistrița-Năsăud |
| 15 | Viitorul Lechința (R) | 28 | 1 | 1 | 26 | 42 | 144 | −102 | 4 | Relegation to Liga V Bistrița-Năsăud |

Rules for classification: 1) Points; 2) Head-to-head points; 3) Head-to-head goal difference; 4) Head-to-head goals scored; 5) Head-to-head away goals scored; 6) Goal difference; 7) Goals scored.
(C) Champions; (Q) Qualified for the phase indicated; (R) Relegated

=== Botoșani County ===
| Pos | Team | Pld | W | D | L | GF | GA | GD | Pts | Qualification or relegation |
|---|---|---|---|---|---|---|---|---|---|---|
| 1 | Sănătatea Darabani (C, Q) | 26 | 25 | 0 | 1 | 100 | 7 | +93 | 75 (Note: TransDor Tudora–Sănătatea Darabani 2–1; Sănătatea Darabani-TransDor Tudora 3–1.) | Qualification to promotion play-off |
| 2 | TransDor Tudora | 26 | 25 | 0 | 1 | 125 | 23 | +102 | 75 | |
| 3 | Europa Hilișeu | 26 | 16 | 2 | 8 | 77 | 51 | +26 | 50 | |
| 4 | Prosport Vârfu Câmpului | 26 | 14 | 4 | 8 | 63 | 46 | +17 | 46 | |
| 5 | Bucovina Rogojești | 26 | 13 | 3 | 10 | 58 | 54 | +4 | 42 | |
| 6 | Rapid Ungureni | 26 | 12 | 3 | 11 | 52 | 41 | +11 | 39 | |
| 7 | Avântul Albești | 26 | 12 | 2 | 12 | 66 | 63 | +3 | 38 | |
| 8 | Sportivul Trușești | 26 | 10 | 4 | 12 | 46 | 66 | −20 | 34 | |
| 9 | Flacăra 1907 Flămânzi | 26 | 11 | 0 | 15 | 56 | 73 | −17 | 33 | |
| 10 | Luceafărul Mihai Eminescu | 26 | 10 | 0 | 16 | 62 | 63 | −1 | 30 (Note: Luceafărul Mihai Eminescu withdrew from the championship and lost all the matches from the second part of the season with 0–3.) | |
| 11 | Viitorul Blândești | 26 | 7 | 3 | 16 | 27 | 81 | −54 | 24 | |
| 12 | Voința Șendriceni | 26 | 6 | 4 | 16 | 46 | 66 | −20 | 22 | |
| 13 | Viitorul Dersca | 26 | 4 | 1 | 21 | 42 | 84 | −42 | 13 | |
| 14 | Victoria Hlipiceni | 26 | 3 | 2 | 21 | 19 | 121 | −102 | 11 | |
| 15 | Progresul Ștefănești (D) | 0 | 0 | 0 | 0 | 0 | 0 | 0 | 0 (Note: Progresul Ștefănești and Flacăra Vlăsinești withdrew in the first part of the season and all their results were canceled.) | Withdrew |
| 16 | Flacăra Vlăsinești (D) | 0 | 0 | 0 | 0 | 0 | 0 | 0 | 0 | Withdrew |

Rules for classification: 1) Points; 2) Head-to-head points; 3) Head-to-head goal difference; 4) Head-to-head goals scored; 5) Head-to-head away goals scored; 6) Goal difference; 7) Goals scored.
(C) Champions; (D) Disqualified; (Q) Qualified for the phase indicated

=== Brașov County ===
| Pos | Team | Pld | W | D | L | GF | GA | GD | Pts | Qualification or relegation |
|---|---|---|---|---|---|---|---|---|---|---|
| 1 | Viitorul Ghimbav (C, Q) | 24 | 20 | 2 | 2 | 105 | 19 | +86 | 62 | Qualification to promotion play-off |
| 2 | Zărnești | 24 | 20 | 2 | 2 | 109 | 21 | +88 | 62 | |
| 3 | Codlea | 24 | 18 | 2 | 4 | 77 | 32 | +45 | 56 | |
| 4 | Precizia Săcele | 24 | 17 | 2 | 5 | 106 | 21 | +85 | 53 | |
| 5 | Inter Cristian | 24 | 17 | 1 | 6 | 82 | 37 | +45 | 52 | |
| 6 | Chimia Victoria | 24 | 13 | 1 | 10 | 63 | 40 | +23 | 40 | |
| 7 | Hălchiu 2013 | 24 | 10 | 4 | 10 | 54 | 62 | −8 | 34 | |
| 8 | Aripile Brașov | 24 | 11 | 0 | 13 | 67 | 55 | +12 | 33 | |
| 9 | Carpați Berivoi | 24 | 7 | 1 | 16 | 45 | 107 | −62 | 22 | |
| 10 | Cetatea Rupea-Homorod | 24 | 7 | 0 | 17 | 37 | 70 | −33 | 21 | |
| 11 | Olimpic Voila | 24 | 4 | 0 | 20 | 29 | 114 | −85 | 12 | |
| 12 | Prietenii Rupea | 24 | 3 | 1 | 20 | 16 | 64 | −48 | 10 | |
| 13 | Steagu Roșu Brașov | 24 | 1 | 0 | 23 | 30 | 178 | −148 | 3 | |

Rules for classification: 1) Points; 2) Head-to-head points; 3) Head-to-head goal difference; 4) Head-to-head goals scored; 5) Head-to-head away goals scored; 6) Goal difference; 7) Goals scored.
(C) Champions; (Q) Qualified for the phase indicated

=== Brăila County ===
| Pos | Team | Pld | W | D | L | GF | GA | GD | Pts | Qualification |
|---|---|---|---|---|---|---|---|---|---|---|
| 1 | Făurei | 20 | 19 | 1 | 0 | 106 | 14 | +92 | 58 | Qualification to championship play-off |
| 2 | Victoria Traian | 20 | 16 | 2 | 2 | 70 | 24 | +46 | 50 | Qualification to championship play-off |
| 3 | Victoria Cazasu | 20 | 10 | 4 | 6 | 64 | 52 | +12 | 34 | Qualification to championship play-off |
| 4 | Viitorul Ianca | 20 | 10 | 2 | 8 | 47 | 37 | +10 | 32 | Qualification to championship play-off |
| 5 | Viitorul Însurăței | 20 | 8 | 3 | 9 | 56 | 49 | +7 | 27 | Qualification to championship play-off |
| 6 | Viitorul Șuțești | 20 | 7 | 4 | 9 | 43 | 47 | −4 | 25 | Qualification to championship play-off |
| 7 | Voința Vișani | 20 | 7 | 3 | 10 | 29 | 52 | −23 | 24 | Qualification to championship play-out |
| 8 | Gloria Movila Miresii | 20 | 5 | 5 | 10 | 30 | 63 | −33 | 20 | Qualification to championship play-out |
| 9 | Dunărea Tichilești | 20 | 6 | 1 | 13 | 39 | 68 | −29 | 19 | Qualification to championship play-out |
| 10 | Dacia Unirea Brăila II | 20 | 4 | 3 | 13 | 27 | 65 | −38 | 15 | Qualification to championship play-out |
| 11 | Pandurii Tudor Vladimirescu | 20 | 3 | 2 | 15 | 29 | 69 | −40 | 11 | Qualification to championship play-out |

Rules for classification: 1) Points; 2) Head-to-head points; 3) Head-to-head goal difference; 4) Head-to-head goals scored; 5) Head-to-head away goals scored; 6) Goal difference; 7) Goals scored.

Championship play-off

The teams started the championship play-off with half of the points accumulated in the regular season.

| Pos | Team | Pld | W | D | L | GF | GA | GD | Pts | Qualification |
|---|---|---|---|---|---|---|---|---|---|---|
| 1 | Victoria Traian (C, Q) | 10 | 8 | 2 | 0 | 29 | 13 | +16 | 51 | Qualification to promotion play-off |
| 2 | Făurei | 10 | 6 | 2 | 2 | 38 | 12 | +26 | 49 | |
| 3 | Viitorul Ianca | 10 | 5 | 3 | 2 | 28 | 18 | +10 | 34 | |
| 4 | Viitorul Însurăței | 10 | 3 | 2 | 5 | 22 | 23 | −1 | 25 | |
| 5 | Victoria Cazasu | 10 | 2 | 1 | 7 | 14 | 39 | −25 | 24 | |
| 6 | Viitorul Șuțești | 10 | 1 | 0 | 9 | 17 | 43 | −26 | 16 | |

Rules for classification: 1) Points; 2) Head-to-head points; 3) Head-to-head goal difference; 4) Head-to-head goals scored; 5) Head-to-head away goals scored; 6) Goal difference; 7) Goals scored.
(C) Champions; (Q) Qualified for the phase indicated

Championship play-out

The teams started the championship play-out with half of the points accumulated in the regular season.

| Pos | Team | Pld | W | D | L | GF | GA | GD | Pts | Relegation |
|---|---|---|---|---|---|---|---|---|---|---|
| 7 | Pandurii Tudor Vladimirescu | 8 | 6 | 0 | 2 | 25 | 18 | +7 | 24 | |
| 8 | Dunărea Tichilești | 8 | 4 | 1 | 3 | 24 | 22 | +2 | 23 | |
| 9 | Voința Vișani | 8 | 3 | 1 | 4 | 20 | 21 | −1 | 22 | |
| 10 | Gloria Movila Miresii (R) | 8 | 3 | 0 | 5 | 15 | 21 | −6 | 19 | Relegation to Liga V Brăila |
| 11 | Dacia Unirea Brăila II (R) | 8 | 3 | 0 | 5 | 20 | 22 | −2 | 17 | Relegation to Liga V Brăila |

Rules for classification: 1) Points; 2) Head-to-head points; 3) Head-to-head goal difference; 4) Head-to-head goals scored; 5) Head-to-head away goals scored; 6) Goal difference; 7) Goals scored.
(R) Relegated

=== Bucharest ===
| Pos | Team | Pld | W | D | L | GF | GA | GD | Pts | Qualification or relegation |
|---|---|---|---|---|---|---|---|---|---|---|
| 1 | Progresul Spartac București (Q) | 28 | 26 | 2 | 0 | 171 | 22 | +149 | 80 | Qualification to championship play-off |
| 2 | Regal Sport Club Ferdinand I (Q) | 28 | 19 | 5 | 4 | 102 | 29 | +73 | 62 | Qualification to championship play-off |
| 3 | Progresul București (Q) | 28 | 20 | 2 | 6 | 91 | 36 | +55 | 62 | Qualification to championship play-off |
| 4 | Termo București (Q) | 28 | 18 | 6 | 4 | 91 | 29 | +62 | 60 | Qualification to championship play-off |
| 5 | Sportul Studențesc București | 28 | 19 | 3 | 6 | 79 | 41 | +38 | 60 | |
| 6 | Olimpic București | 28 | 15 | 2 | 11 | 83 | 63 | +20 | 47 | |
| 7 | Tricolor București | 28 | 13 | 2 | 13 | 66 | 85 | −19 | 41 | |
| 8 | Metaloglobus București II | 28 | 11 | 3 | 14 | 58 | 62 | −4 | 36 | |
| 9 | Comprest GIM București | 28 | 8 | 6 | 14 | 56 | 63 | −7 | 30 | |
| 10 | Progresul 2005 București | 28 | 9 | 2 | 17 | 66 | 110 | −44 | 29 | |
| 11 | Electroaparataj București | 28 | 9 | 0 | 19 | 41 | 60 | −19 | 27 (Note: Electroaparataj București expelled in the second part of the season and lost all remaining matches with 0–3.) | |
| 12 | Venus București | 28 | 8 | 3 | 17 | 55 | 95 | −40 | 27 | |
| 13 | Victoria București | 28 | 7 | 4 | 17 | 46 | 117 | −71 | 25 | |
| 14 | Electrica București | 28 | 3 | 5 | 20 | 31 | 103 | −72 | 14 | |
| 15 | Romprim București (R) | 28 | 1 | 3 | 24 | 31 | 152 | −121 | 6 | Relegation to Liga V Bucharest |
| 16 | Frăția București (R) | 0 | 0 | 0 | 0 | 0 | 0 | 0 | 0 (Note: Frăția București expelled in the first part of the season and all its results were canceled.) | Expelled |

Rules for classification: 1) Points; 2) Head-to-head points; 3) Head-to-head goal difference; 4) Head-to-head goals scored; 5) Head-to-head away goals scored; 6) Goal difference; 7) Goals scored.
(Q) Qualified for the phase indicated; (R) Relegated
Notes:

Championship play-off

Championship play-off played in a single round-robin tournament between the best four teams of the regular season. The teams started the play-off with the following points: 1st place – 3 points, 2nd place – 2 points, 3rd place – 1 point, 4th place – 0 points.

| Pos | Team | Pld | W | D | L | GF | GA | GD | Pts | Qualification |
|---|---|---|---|---|---|---|---|---|---|---|
| 1 | Progresul Spartac București (C, Q) | 3 | 3 | 0 | 0 | 5 | 1 | +4 | 12 | Qualification to promotion play-off |
| 2 | Progresul București | 3 | 2 | 0 | 1 | 5 | 2 | +3 | 7 | |
| 3 | Regal Sport Club Ferdinand I | 3 | 1 | 0 | 2 | 2 | 3 | −1 | 5 | |
| 4 | Termo București | 3 | 0 | 0 | 3 | 1 | 7 | −6 | 0 | |

Rules for classification: 1) Points; 2) Head-to-head points; 3) Head-to-head goal difference; 4) Head-to-head goals scored; 5) Head-to-head away goals scored; 6) Goal difference; 7) Goals scored.
(C) Champions; (Q) Qualified for the phase indicated

=== Buzău County ===
| Pos | Team | Pld | W | D | L | GF | GA | GD | Pts | Qualification or relegation |
|---|---|---|---|---|---|---|---|---|---|---|
| 1 | Metalul Buzău | 30 | 29 | 1 | 0 | 164 | 13 | +151 | 88 | Qualification to promotion play-off |
| 2 | Team Săgeata | 30 | 27 | 0 | 3 | 127 | 25 | +102 | 81 | |
| 3 | Petrolul Berca | 30 | 22 | 2 | 6 | 94 | 49 | +45 | 65 (Note: Petrolul Berca were deducted 3 points) | |
| 4 | Voința Lanurile | 30 | 20 | 4 | 6 | 104 | 36 | +68 | 64 | |
| 5 | Avântul Zărnești | 30 | 20 | 2 | 8 | 105 | 49 | +56 | 62 | |
| 6 | Montana Pătârlagele | 30 | 15 | 5 | 10 | 68 | 60 | +8 | 50 | |
| 7 | Recolta Sălcioara | 30 | 13 | 5 | 12 | 88 | 68 | +20 | 44 | |
| 8 | Tricolorul Gălbinași | 30 | 13 | 2 | 15 | 61 | 74 | −13 | 41 | |
| 9 | Înfrățirea Zoița | 30 | 12 | 3 | 15 | 44 | 60 | −16 | 39 | |
| 10 | Diadema Gherăseni | 30 | 11 | 3 | 16 | 51 | 83 | −32 | 36 | |
| 11 | Viitorul 08 Vernești | 30 | 10 | 2 | 18 | 64 | 91 | −27 | 32 | |
| 12 | Victoria Boboc | 30 | 10 | 1 | 19 | 55 | 81 | −26 | 31 | |
| 13 | Șoimii Siriu | 30 | 8 | 3 | 19 | 60 | 127 | −67 | 27 | |
| 14 | Locomotiva Buzău (O) | 30 | 7 | 3 | 20 | 55 | 112 | −57 | 24 | Qualification to relegation play-off |
| 15 | Gloria Vadu Pașii (R) | 30 | 4 | 0 | 26 | 26 | 125 | −99 | 12 (Note: Gloria Vadu Pașii and Șoimii Costești withdrew during the winter break and lost all the matches from the second part of the season with 0–3.) | Relegation to Liga V Buzău |
| 16 | Șoimii Costești (R) | 30 | 1 | 0 | 29 | 13 | 126 | −113 | 3 | Relegation to Liga V Buzău |

Rules for classification: 1) Points; 2) Head-to-head points; 3) Head-to-head goal difference; 4) Head-to-head goals scored; 5) Head-to-head away goals scored; 6) Goal difference; 7) Goals scored.
(O) Play-off winners; (R) Relegated
Notes:

Promotion/relegation play-off

The 14th of Liga IV Buzău County faces the 2nd-placed teams in the two series of Liga V Buzău County.

| Pos | Team | Pld | W | D | L | GF | GA | GD | Pts | Promotion |
|---|---|---|---|---|---|---|---|---|---|---|
| 1 | Pescărușul Luciu | 2 | 1 | 0 | 1 | 4 | 2 | +2 | 3 | Promotion to Liga IV Buzău |
| 2 | Locomotiva Buzău | 2 | 1 | 0 | 1 | 5 | 5 | 0 | 3 | Remain in Liga IV Buzău |
| 3 | Recolta Blăjani | 2 | 1 | 0 | 1 | 4 | 6 | −2 | 3 | |

Rules for classification: 1) Points; 2) Head-to-head points; 3) Head-to-head goal difference; 4) Head-to-head goals scored; 5) Head-to-head away goals scored; 6) Goal difference; 7) Goals scored.

=== Caraș-Severin County ===
| Pos | Team | Pld | W | D | L | GF | GA | GD | Pts | Qualification or relegation |
|---|---|---|---|---|---|---|---|---|---|---|
| 1 | Viitorul Caransebeș (C, Q) | 24 | 22 | 0 | 2 | 107 | 22 | +85 | 66 | Qualification to promotion play-off |
| 2 | Voința Lupac | 24 | 21 | 2 | 1 | 123 | 9 | +114 | 65 | |
| 3 | Oravița | 24 | 15 | 3 | 6 | 91 | 45 | +46 | 48 | |
| 4 | Berzasca | 24 | 14 | 2 | 8 | 64 | 37 | +27 | 44 | |
| 5 | Minerul Anina | 24 | 11 | 4 | 9 | 89 | 53 | +36 | 37 | |
| 6 | Moldova Nouă | 24 | 11 | 3 | 10 | 61 | 48 | +13 | 36 | |
| 7 | Nera Bozovici | 24 | 11 | 1 | 12 | 63 | 92 | −29 | 34 | |
| 8 | Rapid Buchin | 24 | 9 | 5 | 10 | 70 | 69 | +1 | 32 | |
| 9 | Agmonia Zăvoi | 24 | 10 | 2 | 12 | 46 | 85 | −39 | 32 | |
| 10 | Metalul Bocșa | 24 | 9 | 2 | 13 | 64 | 63 | +1 | 29 | |
| 11 | Muncitorul Reșița | 24 | 7 | 3 | 14 | 50 | 130 | −80 | 24 | |
| 12 | Ad Mediam Mehadia | 24 | 1 | 1 | 22 | 12 | 88 | −76 | 4 (Note: Ad Mediam Mehadia withdrew during the winter break and lost all the remaining matches with 0–3.) | |
| 13 | Recolta Rafnic | 24 | 1 | 0 | 23 | 38 | 137 | −99 | 3 | |

Rules for classification: 1) Points; 2) Head-to-head points; 3) Head-to-head goal difference; 4) Head-to-head goals scored; 5) Head-to-head away goals scored; 6) Goal difference; 7) Goals scored.
(C) Champions; (Q) Qualified for the phase indicated

=== Călărași County ===
| Pos | Team | Pld | W | D | L | GF | GA | GD | Pts | Qualification or relegation |
|---|---|---|---|---|---|---|---|---|---|---|
| 1 | Agricola Borcea (C, Q) | 30 | 27 | 1 | 2 | 131 | 33 | +98 | 82 | Qualification to promotion play-off |
| 2 | Venus Independența | 30 | 25 | 3 | 2 | 143 | 31 | +112 | 78 | |
| 3 | Dunărea Ciocănești | 30 | 23 | 4 | 3 | 132 | 29 | +103 | 73 | |
| 4 | Victoria Chirnogi | 30 | 22 | 3 | 5 | 121 | 45 | +76 | 69 | |
| 5 | Unirea Mânăstirea | 30 | 18 | 2 | 10 | 94 | 56 | +38 | 56 | |
| 6 | Roseți | 30 | 17 | 2 | 11 | 111 | 61 | +50 | 53 | |
| 7 | Spicul Vâlcelele | 30 | 14 | 4 | 12 | 70 | 60 | +10 | 46 | |
| 8 | Dunărea Grădiștea | 30 | 11 | 6 | 13 | 59 | 55 | +4 | 39 | |
| 9 | Victoria Lehliu | 30 | 11 | 6 | 13 | 57 | 53 | +4 | 39 | |
| 10 | Unirea Dragalina | 30 | 10 | 2 | 18 | 49 | 98 | −49 | 32 | |
| 11 | Progresul Fundulea | 30 | 8 | 5 | 17 | 48 | 84 | −36 | 29 | |
| 12 | Vitorul Curcani | 30 | 8 | 3 | 19 | 55 | 143 | −88 | 27 | |
| 13 | Steaua Radovanu | 30 | 7 | 3 | 20 | 59 | 117 | −58 | 24 | |
| 14 | Dinamo Sărulești | 30 | 7 | 1 | 22 | 45 | 122 | −77 | 22 | |
| 15 | Rapid Ulmeni (R) | 30 | 5 | 2 | 23 | 51 | 134 | −83 | 17 | Relegation to Liga V Călărași |
| 16 | Conpet Ștefan Cel Mare (R) | 30 | 3 | 1 | 26 | 36 | 140 | −104 | 10 | Relegation to Liga V Călărași |

Rules for classification: 1) Points; 2) Head-to-head points; 3) Head-to-head goal difference; 4) Head-to-head goals scored; 5) Head-to-head away goals scored; 6) Goal difference; 7) Goals scored.
(C) Champions; (Q) Qualified for the phase indicated; (R) Relegated

=== Cluj County ===
| Pos | Team | Pld | W | D | L | GF | GA | GD | Pts | Qualification or relegation |
|---|---|---|---|---|---|---|---|---|---|---|
| 1 | Alb-Negru Cluj-Napoca (C, Q) | 28 | 27 | 1 | 0 | 167 | 9 | +158 | 82 | Qualification to promotion play-off |
| 2 | Atletic Olimpia Gherla | 28 | 19 | 4 | 5 | 57 | 21 | +36 | 61 | |
| 3 | Sticla Arieșul Turda | 28 | 18 | 6 | 4 | 92 | 42 | +50 | 60 | |
| 4 | Florești | 28 | 16 | 4 | 8 | 80 | 42 | +38 | 52 | |
| 5 | Armenopolis Gherla | 28 | 16 | 1 | 11 | 72 | 67 | +5 | 49 | |
| 6 | Someșul Gilău | 28 | 14 | 3 | 11 | 61 | 67 | −6 | 45 | |
| 7 | Unirea Tritenii de Jos | 28 | 11 | 5 | 12 | 54 | 69 | −15 | 38 | |
| 8 | Arieșul Mihai Viteazu | 28 | 11 | 3 | 14 | 62 | 81 | −19 | 36 | |
| 9 | Ardealul Cluj | 28 | 10 | 2 | 16 | 76 | 69 | +7 | 32 | |
| 10 | Viile Dejului | 28 | 9 | 4 | 15 | 47 | 76 | −29 | 31 | |
| 11 | Industria Sârmei Câmpia Turzii | 28 | 9 | 2 | 17 | 50 | 96 | −46 | 29 | |
| 12 | Vulturul Mintiu Gherlii | 28 | 8 | 4 | 16 | 44 | 68 | −24 | 28 | |
| 13 | Unirea Florești | 28 | 7 | 6 | 15 | 50 | 83 | −33 | 27 | |
| 14 | CFR Dej | 28 | 6 | 1 | 21 | 33 | 79 | −46 | 19 | |
| 15 | Viitorul Mihai Georgescu Cluj-Napoca | 28 | 5 | 2 | 21 | 52 | 128 | −76 | 17 | |

Rules for classification: 1) Points; 2) Head-to-head points; 3) Head-to-head goal difference; 4) Head-to-head goals scored; 5) Head-to-head away goals scored; 6) Goal difference; 7) Goals scored.
(C) Champions; (Q) Qualified for the phase indicated

=== Constanța County ===
| Pos | Team | Pld | W | D | L | GF | GA | GD | Pts | Qualification or relegation |
|---|---|---|---|---|---|---|---|---|---|---|
| 1 | Farul Constanța (C, Q) | 34 | 32 | 1 | 1 | 135 | 14 | +121 | 97 | Qualification to promotion play-off |
| 2 | Viitorul Fântânele | 34 | 25 | 5 | 4 | 125 | 40 | +85 | 80 | |
| 3 | Năvodari | 34 | 23 | 5 | 6 | 117 | 39 | +78 | 74 | |
| 4 | Agigea | 34 | 22 | 2 | 10 | 100 | 67 | +33 | 68 | |
| 5 | Eforie | 34 | 19 | 3 | 12 | 87 | 62 | +25 | 60 | |
| 6 | Gloria Băneasa | 34 | 19 | 2 | 13 | 90 | 82 | +8 | 59 | |
| 7 | Gloria Albești | 34 | 16 | 3 | 15 | 81 | 66 | +15 | 51 | |
| 8 | Victoria Mihai Viteazu | 34 | 14 | 8 | 12 | 91 | 76 | +15 | 50 | |
| 9 | Sparta Techirghiol | 34 | 16 | 2 | 16 | 85 | 94 | −9 | 50 | |
| 10 | Ovidiu | 34 | 15 | 3 | 16 | 81 | 84 | −3 | 48 | |
| 11 | Știința ACALAB Poarta Albă | 34 | 13 | 3 | 18 | 73 | 92 | −19 | 42 | |
| 12 | Mihail Kogălniceanu | 34 | 11 | 4 | 19 | 59 | 92 | −33 | 37 | |
| 13 | Farul Tuzla | 34 | 11 | 4 | 19 | 47 | 89 | −42 | 37 | |
| 14 | Portul Constanța | 34 | 10 | 3 | 21 | 48 | 83 | −35 | 33 | |
| 15 | Avântul Comana | 34 | 8 | 5 | 21 | 56 | 117 | −61 | 29 | |
| 16 | Unirea Topraisar | 34 | 7 | 6 | 21 | 48 | 87 | −39 | 27 | |
| 17 | Voința Valu lui Traian (R) | 34 | 7 | 2 | 25 | 61 | 130 | −69 | 23 | Relegation to Liga V Constanța |
| 18 | CFR Constanța (R) | 34 | 7 | 1 | 26 | 47 | 117 | −70 | 22 | Relegation to Liga V Constanța |

Rules for classification: 1) Points; 2) Head-to-head points; 3) Head-to-head goal difference; 4) Head-to-head goals scored; 5) Head-to-head away goals scored; 6) Goal difference; 7) Goals scored.
(C) Champions; (Q) Qualified for the phase indicated; (R) Relegated

=== Covasna County ===
| Pos | Team | Pld | W | D | L | GF | GA | GD | Pts | Qualification or relegation |
|---|---|---|---|---|---|---|---|---|---|---|
| 1 | KSE Târgu Secuiesc (C, Q) | 30 | 25 | 3 | 2 | 120 | 17 | +103 | 78 | Qualification to promotion play-off |
| 2 | Nemere Ghelința | 30 | 23 | 2 | 5 | 100 | 39 | +61 | 71 | |
| 3 | Păpăuți | 30 | 22 | 3 | 5 | 92 | 35 | +57 | 69 | |
| 4 | Reci | 30 | 18 | 4 | 8 | 83 | 51 | +32 | 58 | |
| 5 | Cernat | 30 | 17 | 5 | 8 | 82 | 34 | +48 | 56 | |
| 6 | Prima Brăduț | 30 | 17 | 5 | 8 | 71 | 41 | +30 | 56 | |
| 7 | BSE Belin | 30 | 12 | 2 | 16 | 46 | 67 | −21 | 38 | |
| 8 | Perko Sânzieni | 30 | 11 | 4 | 15 | 67 | 62 | +5 | 37 | |
| 9 | Venus Ozun | 30 | 11 | 3 | 16 | 58 | 94 | −36 | 36 | |
| 10 | Ojdula | 30 | 11 | 2 | 17 | 48 | 79 | −31 | 35 | |
| 11 | Avântul Ilieni | 30 | 10 | 3 | 17 | 51 | 65 | −14 | 33 | |
| 12 | Harghita Aita Mare | 30 | 10 | 1 | 19 | 49 | 58 | −9 | 31 | |
| 13 | Covasna | 30 | 9 | 4 | 17 | 52 | 85 | −33 | 31 | |
| 14 | Baraolt | 30 | 8 | 3 | 19 | 38 | 120 | −82 | 27 | |
| 15 | Brețcu (R) | 30 | 7 | 3 | 20 | 37 | 92 | −55 | 24 | Relegation to Liga V Covasna |
| 16 | Oltul Chilieni (R) | 30 | 4 | 3 | 23 | 23 | 78 | −55 | 15 (Note: Oltul Chilieni withdrew from championship during the winter break and lost all the remaining matches with 0–3.) | Relegation to Liga V Covasna |

Rules for classification: 1) Points; 2) Head-to-head points; 3) Head-to-head goal difference; 4) Head-to-head goals scored; 5) Head-to-head away goals scored; 6) Goal difference; 7) Goals scored.
(C) Champions; (Q) Qualified for the phase indicated; (R) Relegated

=== Dâmbovița County ===
| Pos | Team | Pld | W | D | L | GF | GA | GD | Pts | Qualification or relegation |
|---|---|---|---|---|---|---|---|---|---|---|
| 1 | Dentaș Tărtășești (C, Q) | 30 | 24 | 5 | 1 | 127 | 24 | +103 | 77 | Qualification to promotion play-off |
| 2 | Gloria Cornești | 30 | 24 | 1 | 5 | 154 | 39 | +115 | 73 | |
| 3 | Recolta Gura Șuții | 30 | 23 | 2 | 5 | 102 | 44 | +58 | 71 | |
| 4 | Voința Perșinari | 30 | 19 | 4 | 7 | 116 | 75 | +41 | 61 | |
| 5 | Brezoaele | 30 | 15 | 6 | 9 | 104 | 73 | +31 | 51 | |
| 6 | Bradul Moroeni | 30 | 14 | 8 | 8 | 68 | 46 | +22 | 50 | |
| 7 | Unirea Ungureni | 30 | 16 | 1 | 13 | 74 | 70 | +4 | 49 | |
| 8 | Petrolul Târgoviște | 30 | 12 | 4 | 14 | 59 | 70 | −11 | 40 | |
| 9 | Viitorul I.L. Caragiale | 30 | 10 | 4 | 16 | 55 | 100 | −45 | 34 | |
| 10 | Atletic Fieni | 30 | 9 | 6 | 15 | 87 | 79 | +8 | 33 | |
| 11 | Luceafărul Dragomirești | 30 | 8 | 3 | 19 | 68 | 84 | −16 | 27 | |
| 12 | Progresul Mătăsaru | 30 | 8 | 3 | 19 | 59 | 104 | −45 | 27 | |
| 13 | Flacara Zăvoiu | 30 | 7 | 4 | 19 | 54 | 124 | −70 | 25 | |
| 14 | Spic de Grâu Ghimpați | 30 | 7 | 3 | 20 | 50 | 120 | −70 | 24 | |
| 15 | PAS Pucioasa (R) | 30 | 6 | 5 | 19 | 48 | 85 | −37 | 23 | Relegation to Liga V Dâmbovița |
| 16 | Petrești (R) | 30 | 6 | 5 | 19 | 56 | 144 | −88 | 22 (Note: Petrești deducted one point.) | Relegation to Liga V Dâmbovița |
| 17 | Gaz Metan Finta (D) | 0 | 0 | 0 | 0 | 0 | 0 | 0 | 0 (Note: Gaz Metan Finta withdrew after 9 rounds and all its results were canceled.) | Withdrew |
| 18 | Libertatea Urziceanca (D) | 0 | 0 | 0 | 0 | 0 | 0 | 0 | 0 (Note: Libertatea Urziceanca withdrew after 6 rounds and all its results were canceled.) | Withdrew |

Rules for classification: 1) Points; 2) Head-to-head points; 3) Head-to-head goal difference; 4) Head-to-head goals scored; 5) Head-to-head away goals scored; 6) Goal difference; 7) Goals scored.
(C) Champions; (D) Disqualified; (Q) Qualified for the phase indicated; (R) Relegated

=== Dolj County ===
| Pos | Team | Pld | W | D | L | GF | GA | GD | Pts | Qualification or relegation |
|---|---|---|---|---|---|---|---|---|---|---|
| 1 | Viitorul Cârcea | 22 | 19 | 1 | 2 | 116 | 22 | +94 | 58 | Qualification to play-off |
| 2 | Tractorul Cetate | 22 | 16 | 4 | 2 | 94 | 33 | +61 | 52 | Qualification to play-off |
| 3 | Progresul Segarcea | 22 | 16 | 3 | 3 | 82 | 31 | +51 | 51 | Qualification to play-off |
| 4 | Metropolitan Ișalnița | 22 | 16 | 2 | 4 | 75 | 23 | +52 | 50 | Qualification to play-off |
| 5 | Știința Danubius Bechet | 22 | 14 | 3 | 5 | 81 | 32 | +49 | 45 | Qualification to play-off |
| 6 | Recolta Ostroveni | 22 | 9 | 3 | 10 | 40 | 64 | −24 | 30 | Qualification to play-off |
| 7 | Dunărea Calafat | 22 | 7 | 2 | 13 | 48 | 64 | −16 | 23 | Qualification to play-out |
| 8 | Unirea Leamna | 22 | 5 | 4 | 13 | 32 | 68 | −36 | 19 | Qualification to play-out |
| 9 | Ajax Dobrotești | 22 | 6 | 1 | 15 | 36 | 74 | −38 | 19 | Qualification to play-out |
| 10 | Arena Bulls Preajba | 22 | 3 | 4 | 15 | 31 | 81 | −50 | 13 | Qualification to play-out |
| 11 | Știința Malu Mare | 22 | 3 | 2 | 17 | 23 | 122 | −99 | 11 | Qualification to play-out |
| 12 | Luceafărul Craiova | 22 | 3 | 1 | 18 | 20 | 64 | −44 | 10 (Note: Luceafărul Craiova withdrew in the second part of the Regular season and lost all remaining matches with 0–3.) | Qualification to play-out |

Rules for classification: 1) Points; 2) Head-to-head points; 3) Head-to-head goal difference; 4) Head-to-head goals scored; 5) Head-to-head away goals scored; 6) Goal difference; 7) Goals scored.
Notes:

Championship play-off

Teams started the play-off with their points from the Regular season halved, rounded upwards, and no other records carried over from the Regular season.

| Pos | Team | Pld | W | D | L | GF | GA | GD | Pts | Qualification |
|---|---|---|---|---|---|---|---|---|---|---|
| 1 | Tractorul Cetate (C, Q) | 10 | 9 | 1 | 0 | 38 | 11 | +27 | 54 | Qualification for promotion play-off |
| 2 | Viitorul Cârcea | 10 | 8 | 0 | 2 | 28 | 15 | +13 | 53 | |
| 3 | Știința Danubius Bechet | 10 | 5 | 0 | 5 | 27 | 27 | 0 | 38 | |
| 4 | Metropolitan Ișalnița | 10 | 3 | 2 | 5 | 17 | 23 | −6 | 36 | |
| 5 | Progresul Segarcea | 10 | 1 | 4 | 5 | 15 | 19 | −4 | 33 | |
| 6 | Recolta Ostroveni | 10 | 0 | 1 | 9 | 13 | 43 | −30 | 16 | |

Rules for classification: 1) Points; 2) Head-to-head points; 3) Head-to-head goal difference; 4) Head-to-head goals scored; 5) Head-to-head away goals scored; 6) Goal difference; 7) Goals scored.
(C) Champions; (Q) Qualified for the phase indicated

Championship play-out

Teams started the play-out with their points from the Regular season halved, rounded upwards, and no other records carried over from the Regular season.

| Pos | Team | Pld | W | D | L | GF | GA | GD | Pts | Relegation |
|---|---|---|---|---|---|---|---|---|---|---|
| 7 | Dunărea Calafat | 8 | 8 | 0 | 0 | 58 | 0 | +58 | 36 | |
| 8 | Unirea Leamna | 8 | 4 | 1 | 3 | 16 | 24 | −8 | 23 | |
| 9 | Ajax Dobrotești | 8 | 4 | 0 | 4 | 20 | 12 | +8 | 22 | |
| 10 | Arena Bulls Preajba | 8 | 2 | 0 | 6 | 8 | 29 | −21 | 13 | |
| 11 | Știința Malu Mare (R) | 8 | 1 | 1 | 6 | 14 | 51 | −37 | 10 | Relegation to Liga V Dolj |
| 12 | Luceafărul Craiova (D) | 0 | 0 | 0 | 0 | 0 | 0 | 0 | 0 (Note: Luceafărul Craiova withdrew in the second part of the regular season.) | Withdrew |

Rules for classification: 1) Points; 2) Head-to-head points; 3) Head-to-head goal difference; 4) Head-to-head goals scored; 5) Head-to-head away goals scored; 6) Goal difference; 7) Goals scored.
(D) Disqualified; (R) Relegated

=== Galați County ===
| Pos | Team | Pld | W | D | L | GF | GA | GD | Pts | Qualification or relegation |
|---|---|---|---|---|---|---|---|---|---|---|
| 1 | Oțelul Galați (C, Q) | 26 | 26 | 0 | 0 | 185 | 14 | +171 | 78 | Qualification to promotion play-off |
| 2 | Avântul Vânători | 26 | 17 | 1 | 8 | 85 | 57 | +28 | 52 | |
| 3 | Victoria Independența | 26 | 16 | 3 | 7 | 63 | 45 | +18 | 51 | |
| 4 | Gloria Ivești | 26 | 16 | 2 | 8 | 74 | 44 | +30 | 50 | |
| 5 | Zimbrul Slobozia Conachi | 26 | 14 | 5 | 7 | 78 | 53 | +25 | 47 | |
| 6 | Unirea Braniștea | 26 | 14 | 3 | 9 | 63 | 48 | +15 | 45 | |
| 7 | Viitorul Costache Negri | 26 | 11 | 6 | 9 | 61 | 67 | −6 | 39 | |
| 8 | Muncitorul Ghidigeni | 26 | 11 | 4 | 11 | 57 | 51 | +6 | 37 | |
| 9 | Quantum Club Galați | 26 | 10 | 6 | 10 | 64 | 59 | +5 | 36 | |
| 10 | Juventus Toflea | 26 | 8 | 2 | 16 | 56 | 94 | −38 | 26 | |
| 11 | Siretul Piscu | 26 | 8 | 1 | 17 | 52 | 98 | −46 | 25 | |
| 12 | Avântul Drăgănești | 26 | 5 | 3 | 18 | 44 | 122 | −78 | 18 | |
| 13 | CSȘ Tecuci (R) | 26 | 4 | 5 | 17 | 39 | 94 | −55 | 17 | Relegation to Liga V Galați |
| 14 | Bujorii Târgu Bujor (R) | 26 | 1 | 1 | 24 | 15 | 90 | −75 | 4 | Relegation to Liga V Galați |

Rules for classification: 1) Points; 2) Head-to-head points; 3) Head-to-head goal difference; 4) Head-to-head goals scored; 5) Head-to-head away goals scored; 6) Goal difference; 7) Goals scored
(C) Champions; (Q) Qualified for the phase indicated; (R) Relegated

=== Giurgiu County ===
South Series

| Pos | Team | Pld | W | D | L | GF | GA | GD | Pts | Qualification or relegation |
|---|---|---|---|---|---|---|---|---|---|---|
| 1 | Mihai Bravu (Q) | 26 | 25 | 1 | 0 | 155 | 28 | +127 | 76 | Qualification to championship play-off |
| 2 | Dunărea Giurgiu (Q) | 26 | 22 | 3 | 1 | 144 | 13 | +131 | 69 | Qualification to championship play-off |
| 3 | Dunărea Oinacu | 26 | 17 | 3 | 6 | 55 | 30 | +25 | 54 | |
| 4 | Unirea Izvoarele | 26 | 14 | 2 | 10 | 69 | 42 | +27 | 44 | |
| 5 | Real Colibași | 26 | 13 | 0 | 13 | 81 | 78 | +3 | 39 | |
| 6 | Giganții Vărăști | 26 | 12 | 2 | 12 | 91 | 76 | +15 | 38 | |
| 7 | Voința Slobozia | 26 | 12 | 2 | 12 | 53 | 68 | −15 | 38 | |
| 8 | Victoria Adunații-Copăceni | 26 | 10 | 4 | 12 | 63 | 89 | −26 | 34 | |
| 9 | Spicul Izvoru | 26 | 9 | 2 | 15 | 51 | 68 | −17 | 27 (Note: Spicul Izvoru, Progresul Valea Dragului and Prundu deducted 2 points.) | |
| 10 | Progresul Valea Dragului | 26 | 9 | 2 | 15 | 57 | 83 | −26 | 27 | |
| 11 | Viitorul Vedea | 26 | 7 | 3 | 16 | 50 | 91 | −41 | 24 | |
| 12 | Prundu | 26 | 6 | 5 | 15 | 59 | 103 | −44 | 21 | |
| 13 | Unirea Frătești | 26 | 6 | 2 | 18 | 41 | 117 | −76 | 20 | |
| 14 | Mihai Viteazu Călugăreni | 26 | 4 | 1 | 21 | 35 | 118 | −83 | 13 | |

Rules for classification: 1) Points; 2) Head-to-head points; 3) Head-to-head goal difference; 4) Head-to-head goals scored; 5) Head-to-head away goals scored; 6) Goal difference; 7) Goals scored.
(Q) Qualified for the phase indicated
Notes:

North Series

| Pos | Team | Pld | W | D | L | GF | GA | GD | Pts | Qualification or relegation |
|---|---|---|---|---|---|---|---|---|---|---|
| 1 | Petrolul Roata de Jos (Q) | 28 | 22 | 3 | 3 | 103 | 31 | +72 | 69 | Qualification to championship play-off |
| 2 | Voința Toporu | 28 | 20 | 5 | 3 | 102 | 49 | +53 | 65 | Ineligible for promotion |
| 3 | Unirea Vânătorii Mici (Q) | 28 | 19 | 4 | 5 | 90 | 33 | +57 | 61 | Qualification to championship play-off |
| 4 | Avântul Florești | 28 | 16 | 3 | 9 | 75 | 51 | +24 | 51 | |
| 5 | Luceafărul Trestieni | 28 | 13 | 4 | 11 | 80 | 72 | +8 | 43 | |
| 6 | Bolintin-Deal | 28 | 13 | 3 | 12 | 75 | 73 | +2 | 42 | |
| 7 | Bolintin Malu Spart | 28 | 11 | 9 | 8 | 64 | 63 | +1 | 42 | |
| 8 | Silver Inter Zorile | 28 | 10 | 4 | 14 | 67 | 76 | −9 | 34 | |
| 9 | Zmeii Ogrezeni | 28 | 8 | 5 | 15 | 56 | 60 | −4 | 29 | |
| 10 | Unirea Joița | 28 | 10 | 5 | 13 | 59 | 69 | −10 | 29 (Note: Unirea Joița deducted 6 points.) | |
| 11 | Voința Podișor | 28 | 8 | 3 | 17 | 67 | 110 | −43 | 25 (Note: Voința Podișor, Argeșul Mihăilești, Olimpia Mârșa and Singureni deducted 2 points.) | |
| 12 | Viitorul Tântava | 28 | 8 | 2 | 18 | 72 | 90 | −18 | 26 | |
| 13 | Singureni | 28 | 7 | 4 | 17 | 48 | 105 | −57 | 23 | |
| 14 | Argeșul Mihăilești | 28 | 7 | 5 | 16 | 56 | 80 | −24 | 24 | |
| 15 | Olimpia Mârșa | 28 | 7 | 3 | 18 | 43 | 95 | −52 | 22 | |

Rules for classification: 1) Points; 2) Head-to-head points; 3) Head-to-head goal difference; 4) Head-to-head goals scored; 5) Head-to-head away goals scored; 6) Goal difference; 7) Goals scored.
(Q) Qualified for the phase indicated
Notes:

Championship play-off

The championship play-off played between the best two ranked teams in each series of the regular season. All matches were played at Comunal Stadium in Izvoarele on 6 and 7 June 2017 the semi-finals and on 10 June 2017 the final.

Semi-finals

| Team 1 | Score | Team 2 |
|---|---|---|
| Mihai Bravu | 4–0 | Unirea Vânătorii Mici |
| Petrolul Roata de Jos | 1–2 | Dunărea Giurgiu |

Final

| Team 1 | Score | Team 2 |
|---|---|---|
| Dunărea Giurgiu | 2–0 | Mihai Bravu |

Dunărea Giurgiu won the 2016–17 Liga IV Giurgiu County and qualify to promotion play-off in Liga III.

=== Gorj County ===
| Pos | Team | Pld | W | D | L | GF | GA | GD | Pts | Qualification or relegation |
|---|---|---|---|---|---|---|---|---|---|---|
| 1 | Internațional Bălești (C, Q) | 30 | 27 | 3 | 0 | 122 | 13 | +109 | 84 | Qualification to promotion play-off |
| 2 | Știința Turceni | 30 | 25 | 2 | 3 | 101 | 28 | +73 | 77 | |
| 3 | Gilortul Târgu Cărbunești | 30 | 24 | 3 | 3 | 99 | 33 | +66 | 75 | |
| 4 | Petrolul Țicleni | 30 | 16 | 6 | 8 | 73 | 61 | +12 | 54 | |
| 5 | Petrolul Bustuchin | 30 | 15 | 7 | 8 | 77 | 57 | +20 | 52 | |
| 6 | Parângul Bumbești-Jiu | 30 | 14 | 6 | 10 | 68 | 65 | +3 | 48 | |
| 7 | Vulturii Fărcășești | 30 | 12 | 6 | 12 | 77 | 77 | 0 | 42 | |
| 8 | Știința Hurezeni | 30 | 11 | 5 | 14 | 57 | 77 | −20 | 38 | |
| 9 | Energetica Tismana | 30 | 10 | 6 | 14 | 56 | 53 | +3 | 36 | |
| 10 | Minerul Mătăsari II | 30 | 11 | 3 | 16 | 45 | 60 | −15 | 36 | |
| 11 | Novaci | 30 | 10 | 3 | 17 | 48 | 74 | −26 | 33 | |
| 12 | Unirea Crușeț | 30 | 8 | 5 | 17 | 66 | 74 | −8 | 29 | |
| 13 | Jiul Rovinari | 30 | 5 | 9 | 16 | 38 | 71 | −33 | 24 | |
| 14 | Stejari | 30 | 6 | 3 | 21 | 47 | 73 | −26 | 21 | |
| 15 | Petrolul Stoina | 30 | 6 | 3 | 21 | 35 | 109 | −74 | 21 | |
| 16 | Viitorul Negomir | 30 | 3 | 4 | 23 | 36 | 120 | −84 | 13 | |

Rules for classification: 1) Points; 2) Head-to-head points; 3) Head-to-head goal difference; 4) Head-to-head goals scored; 5) Head-to-head away goals scored; 6) Goal difference; 7) Goals scored.
(C) Champions; (Q) Qualified for the phase indicated

=== Harghita County ===
| Pos | Team | Pld | W | D | L | GF | GA | GD | Pts | Qualification or relegation |
|---|---|---|---|---|---|---|---|---|---|---|
| 1 | Pro Mureșul Toplița | 18 | 13 | 2 | 3 | 69 | 15 | +54 | 41 | Qualification to championship play-off |
| 2 | Unirea Cristuru Secuiesc | 18 | 13 | 1 | 4 | 54 | 24 | +30 | 40 | Qualification to championship play-off |
| 3 | Miercurea Ciuc II | 18 | 12 | 1 | 5 | 86 | 21 | +65 | 37 | Qualification to championship play-off |
| 4 | MÜ Frumoasa | 18 | 9 | 3 | 6 | 38 | 35 | +3 | 30 | Qualification to championship play-off |
| 5 | Homorod Merești | 18 | 7 | 3 | 8 | 36 | 44 | −8 | 24 | Qualification to play-off |
| 6 | Tulgheș | 18 | 7 | 3 | 8 | 40 | 68 | −28 | 24 | Qualification to play-off |
| 7 | Bastya Lăzarea | 18 | 6 | 3 | 9 | 22 | 51 | −29 | 21 | Qualification to play-off |
| 8 | Minerul Bălan | 18 | 8 | 2 | 8 | 42 | 43 | −1 | 20 (Note: Minerul Bălan deducted 6 points.) | Qualification to relegation play-out |
| 9 | Roseal Odorheiu Secuiesc | 18 | 4 | 1 | 13 | 29 | 56 | −27 | 13 | Qualification to relegation play-out |
| 10 | Délhegy Ciumani | 18 | 1 | 1 | 16 | 18 | 77 | −59 | 4 | Qualification to relegation play-out |

Rules for classification: 1) Points; 2) Head-to-head points; 3) Head-to-head goal difference; 4) Head-to-head goals scored; 5) Head-to-head away goals scored; 6) Goal difference; 7) Goals scored.
Notes:

Championship play-off

The teams start ed the play-off with half of the points accumulated in the regular season.

| Pos | Team | Pld | W | D | L | GF | GA | GD | Pts | Qualification |
|---|---|---|---|---|---|---|---|---|---|---|
| 1 | Pro Mureșul Toplița (C, Q) | 6 | 3 | 1 | 2 | 13 | 8 | +5 | 31 | Qualification to promotion play-off |
| 2 | Unirea Cristuru Secuiesc | 6 | 3 | 0 | 3 | 17 | 17 | 0 | 29 | |
| 3 | Miercurea Ciuc II | 6 | 3 | 0 | 3 | 17 | 9 | +8 | 28 | |
| 4 | MÜ Frumoasa | 6 | 2 | 1 | 3 | 10 | 23 | −13 | 22 | |

Rules for classification: 1) Points; 2) Head-to-head points; 3) Head-to-head goal difference; 4) Head-to-head goals scored; 5) Head-to-head away goals scored; 6) Goal difference; 7) Goals scored.
(C) Champions; (Q) Qualified for the phase indicated

Play-off

The teams start ed the play-off with half of the points accumulated in the regular season.

| Pos | Team | Pld | W | D | L | GF | GA | GD | Pts |
|---|---|---|---|---|---|---|---|---|---|
| 5 | Tulgheș | 4 | 2 | 1 | 1 | 7 | 5 | +2 | 19 |
| 6 | Homorod Merești | 4 | 2 | 0 | 2 | 12 | 13 | −1 | 18 |
| 7 | Bastya Lăzarea | 4 | 1 | 1 | 2 | 10 | 11 | −1 | 15 |

Rules for classification: 1) Points; 2) Head-to-head points; 3) Head-to-head goal difference; 4) Head-to-head goals scored; 5) Head-to-head away goals scored; 6) Goal difference; 7) Goals scored.

Relegation play-out

The teams start ed the play-out with half of the points accumulated in the regular season.

| Pos | Team | Pld | W | D | L | GF | GA | GD | Pts | Relegation |
|---|---|---|---|---|---|---|---|---|---|---|
| 8 | Minerul Bălan | 4 | 3 | 0 | 1 | 16 | 8 | +8 | 19 | |
| 9 | Roseal Odorheiu Secuiesc | 4 | 3 | 0 | 1 | 14 | 9 | +5 | 16 | |
| 10 | Délhegy Ciumani (R) | 4 | 0 | 0 | 4 | 5 | 18 | −13 | 2 | Relegation to Liga V Harghita |

Rules for classification: 1) Points; 2) Head-to-head points; 3) Head-to-head goal difference; 4) Head-to-head goals scored; 5) Head-to-head away goals scored; 6) Goal difference; 7) Goals scored.
(R) Relegated

=== Hunedoara County ===
Team changes from the previous season

- FC Hunedoara was admitted upon request after withdrawing from Liga III.
- Gloria Geoagiu (10th place; withdrew) and Cetate Deva II (14th place; withdrew) were relegated to Liga V Hunedoara.
- Vulcan withdrew.

| Pos | Team | Pld | W | D | L | GF | GA | GD | Pts | Qualification or relegation |
|---|---|---|---|---|---|---|---|---|---|---|
| 1 | Inter Petrila (C, Q) | 22 | 17 | 2 | 3 | 84 | 17 | +67 | 53 | Qualification to promotion play-off |
| 2 | Șoimul Băița | 22 | 14 | 3 | 5 | 69 | 19 | +50 | 45 (Note: 1. Șoimul Băița 7 Pts; 2. Retezatul Hațeg 7 Pts; 3. Hercules Lupeni 2 Pts) | |
| 3 | Retezatul Hațeg | 22 | 14 | 3 | 5 | 54 | 28 | +26 | 45 | |
| 4 | Hercules Lupeni (Note: Hercules Lupeni deducted 3 points.) | 22 | 15 | 3 | 4 | 59 | 19 | +40 | 45 | |
| 5 | Hunedoara | 22 | 13 | 4 | 5 | 55 | 18 | +37 | 43 | |
| 6 | Aurul Brad | 22 | 13 | 2 | 7 | 51 | 27 | +24 | 41 | |
| 7 | Aurul Certej | 22 | 10 | 2 | 10 | 45 | 46 | −1 | 32 | |
| 8 | Victoria Călan | 22 | 9 | 4 | 9 | 37 | 47 | −10 | 28 (Note: Victoria Călan deducted 3 points.) | |
| 9 | Jiul Petroșani | 22 | 6 | 1 | 15 | 22 | 61 | −39 | 19 | |
| 10 | Universitatea Petroșani | 22 | 4 | 2 | 16 | 27 | 64 | −37 | 14 | |
| 11 | Metalul Crișcior | 22 | 1 | 2 | 19 | 19 | 94 | −75 | 5 | |
| 12 | Minerul Uricani | 22 | 1 | 2 | 19 | 15 | 97 | −82 | 5 | |

Rules for classification: 1) Points; 2) Head-to-head points; 3) Head-to-head goal difference; 4) Head-to-head goals scored; 5) Head-to-head away goals scored; 6) Goal difference; 7) Goals scored.
(C) Champions; (Q) Qualified for the phase indicated

=== Ialomița County ===
Team changes from the previous season

- Olimpia Rădulești (14th place; withdrew) and Voința Reviga (16th place) were relegated to Liga V Ialomița.
- Bărăganul Ciulnița (Series I winners), Secunda Adâncata (Series II winners) and Voința Maia (Series II runners-up and promotion/relegation play-offs winners) were promoted from Liga V Ialomița.
- Andrias Andrășești withdrew.
- CS Amara (15th place and promotion/relegation play-offs losers) was spared from relegation.

| Pos | Team | Pld | W | D | L | GF | GA | GD | Pts | Qualification or relegation |
|---|---|---|---|---|---|---|---|---|---|---|
| 1 | Amara (C, Q) | 30 | 25 | 3 | 2 | 94 | 28 | +66 | 78 | Qualification to promotion play-off |
| 2 | Recolta Gheorghe Doja | 30 | 22 | 3 | 5 | 103 | 46 | +57 | 69 | |
| 3 | Rapid Fetești | 30 | 20 | 3 | 7 | 94 | 51 | +43 | 63 | |
| 4 | Victoria Munteni-Buzău | 30 | 20 | 2 | 8 | 85 | 45 | +40 | 62 | |
| 5 | Abatorul Slobozia | 30 | 17 | 4 | 9 | 74 | 55 | +19 | 55 | |
| 6 | Unirea Ion Roată | 30 | 14 | 2 | 14 | 84 | 73 | +11 | 44 | |
| 7 | Bărăganul Ciulnița | 30 | 14 | 1 | 15 | 75 | 75 | 0 | 43 | |
| 8 | Victoria Țăndărei | 30 | 11 | 8 | 11 | 67 | 56 | +11 | 41 | |
| 9 | Recolta Gheorghe Lazăr | 30 | 12 | 2 | 16 | 74 | 71 | +3 | 38 | |
| 10 | Viitorul Axintele | 30 | 12 | 2 | 16 | 66 | 73 | −7 | 38 | |
| 11 | Spicul Colilia | 30 | 11 | 5 | 14 | 74 | 82 | −8 | 38 | |
| 12 | Secunda Adâncata | 30 | 12 | 1 | 17 | 66 | 81 | −15 | 37 | |
| 13 | Recolta Bărcănești | 30 | 11 | 3 | 16 | 52 | 70 | −18 | 36 | |
| 14 | Voința Maia (R) | 30 | 9 | 5 | 16 | 67 | 92 | −25 | 32 | Relegation to Liga V Ialomița |
| 15 | Traian (R) | 30 | 5 | 1 | 24 | 52 | 142 | −90 | 16 | Relegation to Liga V Ialomița |
| 16 | Fulgerul Fierbinți (R) | 30 | 1 | 3 | 26 | 18 | 105 | −87 | 6 (Note: Fulgerul Fierbinți withdrew after 26 rounds and lost all remaining matches with 0–3.) | Relegation to Liga V Ialomița |

Rules for classification: 1) Points; 2) Head-to-head points; 3) Head-to-head goal difference; 4) Head-to-head goals scored; 5) Head-to-head away goals scored; 6) Goal difference; 7) Goals scored.
(C) Champions; (Q) Qualified for the phase indicated; (R) Relegated

=== Iași County ===
Team changes from the previous season

- Siretul Lespezi achieved promotion to Liga III.
- AS Holboca (15th place) was relegated to Liga V Iași.
- Unirea Scânteia (Series I winners), Flacăra Erbiceni (Series II winners), Voința Moțca (Series I winners) and Foresta Ciurea (Series I runners-up and promotion play-offs winners) (Note: Foresta Ciurea won the runners-up promotion play-off, after 3–1 vs. Zimbrul Boureni and 1–0 vs. Știința Movileni (final table: Foresta Ciurea 4 pts, 4–1; Știința Movileni 1 pts, 2–3; Zimbrul Boureni 1 pt, 3–5).) were promoted from Liga V Iași.
- Forța Podu Iloaiei widhrew.
- Foresta Ciurea was renamed CS Ciurea.

| Pos | Team | Pld | W | D | L | GF | GA | GD | Pts | Qualification or relegation |
|---|---|---|---|---|---|---|---|---|---|---|
| 1 | Unirea Mircești (C, Q) | 28 | 25 | 1 | 2 | 119 | 20 | +99 | 76 | Qualification to promotion play-off |
| 2 | Unirea Ruginoasa | 28 | 23 | 3 | 2 | 103 | 26 | +77 | 72 | |
| 3 | Steaua Magică Iași | 28 | 18 | 4 | 6 | 86 | 27 | +59 | 58 | |
| 4 | Flacăra Erbiceni | 28 | 17 | 2 | 9 | 86 | 46 | +40 | 53 | |
| 5 | Stejarul Sinești | 28 | 14 | 7 | 7 | 66 | 35 | +31 | 49 | |
| 6 | Viitorul Hârlău | 28 | 15 | 4 | 9 | 62 | 45 | +17 | 49 | |
| 7 | Viitorul Lungani | 28 | 12 | 5 | 11 | 42 | 44 | −2 | 41 | |
| 8 | Stejarul Bârnova | 28 | 11 | 2 | 15 | 56 | 61 | −5 | 35 | |
| 9 | Unirea Scânteia | 28 | 10 | 3 | 15 | 48 | 59 | −11 | 33 | |
| 10 | Ciurea | 28 | 8 | 6 | 14 | 53 | 70 | −17 | 30 | |
| 11 | Tomești | 28 | 8 | 4 | 16 | 47 | 65 | −18 | 28 | |
| 12 | Gloria Bălțați | 28 | 9 | 1 | 18 | 46 | 79 | −33 | 28 | |
| 13 | Voința Moțca | 28 | 6 | 2 | 20 | 35 | 104 | −69 | 20 | |
| 14 | Olimpia Popricani (R) | 28 | 6 | 1 | 21 | 32 | 117 | −85 | 19 | Relegation to Liga V Iași |
| 15 | Gloria Balș (R) | 28 | 4 | 3 | 21 | 27 | 110 | −83 | 15 | Relegation to Liga V Iași |
| 16 | Venus Butea (D) | 0 | 0 | 0 | 0 | 0 | 0 | 0 | 0 (Note: Venus Butea withdrew after 7 rounds and all its results were canceled.) | Withdrew |

Rules for classification: 1) Points; 2) Head-to-head points; 3) Head-to-head goal difference; 4) Head-to-head goals scored; 5) Head-to-head away goals scored; 6) Goal difference; 7) Goals scored.
(C) Champions; (D) Disqualified; (Q) Qualified for the phase indicated; (R) Relegated

=== Ilfov County ===
Team changes from the previous season

- Fulgerul Cernica and Ștefănești II withdrew.
- FC 1 Decembrie, Metalplast Jilava, Voința Crevedia II, Viitorul Berceni and Codrii Vlăsiei Moara Vlăsiei were admitted upon request.
- CS Ciorogârla was renamed Sportul Ciorogârla.

Series I

| Pos | Team | Pld | W | D | L | GF | GA | GD | Pts | Qualification or relegation |
|---|---|---|---|---|---|---|---|---|---|---|
| 1 | Bragadiru (Q) | 24 | 20 | 0 | 4 | 96 | 23 | +73 | 60 | Qualification to championship final |
| 2 | Voința Buftea | 24 | 19 | 0 | 5 | 91 | 38 | +53 | 57 | |
| 3 | Voluntari III | 24 | 14 | 3 | 7 | 52 | 39 | +13 | 45 | |
| 4 | Athletico Floreasca | 24 | 13 | 3 | 8 | 68 | 50 | +18 | 42 | |
| 5 | Viitorul Domnești II | 24 | 12 | 4 | 8 | 62 | 60 | +2 | 40 | |
| 6 | Chitila | 22 | 11 | 1 | 10 | 68 | 42 | +26 | 34 (Note: Chitila, Glina and Voința Crevedia withdrew during the winter half and lost all remaining matches with 0–3.) | |
| 7 | Sportul Ciorogârla | 24 | 9 | 4 | 11 | 51 | 74 | −23 | 31 | |
| 8 | Glina | 22 | 9 | 2 | 11 | 69 | 47 | +22 | 29 | |
| 9 | Periș | 24 | 8 | 2 | 14 | 51 | 67 | −16 | 26 | |
| 10 | Dărăști | 23 | 6 | 4 | 13 | 47 | 93 | −46 | 22 | |
| 11 | 1 Decembrie | 23 | 6 | 3 | 14 | 37 | 85 | −48 | 21 | |
| 12 | Metalplast Jilava | 24 | 5 | 4 | 15 | 47 | 97 | −50 | 19 | |
| 13 | Voința Crevedia | 22 | 5 | 0 | 17 | 31 | 55 | −24 | 15 | |
| 14 | Măgurele (D) | 0 | 0 | 0 | 0 | 0 | 0 | 0 | 0 (Note: Măgurele withdrew after 6 rounds and all its results were canceled.) | Withdrew |

Rules for classification: 1) Points; 2) Head-to-head points; 3) Head-to-head goal difference; 4) Head-to-head goals scored; 5) Head-to-head away goals scored; 6) Goal difference; 7) Goals scored.
(D) Disqualified; (Q) Qualified for the phase indicated
Notes:

Series II

| Pos | Team | Pld | W | D | L | GF | GA | GD | Pts | Qualification or relegation |
|---|---|---|---|---|---|---|---|---|---|---|
| 1 | Voința Crevedia II (Q) | 26 | 24 | 0 | 2 | 147 | 26 | +121 | 72 | Qualification to championship final |
| 2 | Viitorul Dragomirești-Vale | 26 | 19 | 2 | 5 | 95 | 34 | +61 | 59 | |
| 3 | Pescărușul Grădiștea | 26 | 18 | 2 | 6 | 107 | 47 | +60 | 56 | |
| 4 | Cornetu | 26 | 15 | 1 | 10 | 69 | 57 | +12 | 46 | |
| 5 | Viitorul Petrăchioaia | 26 | 15 | 0 | 11 | 75 | 47 | +28 | 45 | |
| 6 | Speranța Săbăreni | 26 | 13 | 3 | 10 | 74 | 71 | +3 | 42 | |
| 7 | Victoria Tânganu | 26 | 12 | 5 | 9 | 76 | 70 | +6 | 41 | |
| 8 | Corbeanca | 26 | 11 | 2 | 13 | 56 | 73 | −17 | 35 | |
| 9 | Gloria Islaz | 26 | 10 | 5 | 11 | 57 | 79 | −22 | 35 | |
| 10 | Vulturul Pasărea | 26 | 10 | 1 | 15 | 51 | 78 | −27 | 31 | |
| 11 | Viitorul Berceni | 26 | 8 | 2 | 16 | 54 | 87 | −33 | 26 | |
| 12 | Gloria Buriaș | 26 | 7 | 0 | 19 | 53 | 131 | −78 | 21 | |
| 13 | Viitorul Găneasa | 26 | 4 | 1 | 21 | 50 | 107 | −57 | 13 | |
| 14 | Codrii Vlăsiei Moara Vlăsiei | 26 | 3 | 2 | 21 | 32 | 89 | −57 | 11 (Note: Codrii Vlăsiei Moara Vlăsiei withdrew in the second part of the season and lost all the remaining matches with 0–3.) | |

Rules for classification: 1) Points; 2) Head-to-head points; 3) Head-to-head goal difference; 4) Head-to-head goals scored; 5) Head-to-head away goals scored; 6) Goal difference; 7) Goals scored.
(Q) Qualified for the phase indicated
Notes:

Championship final

| Team 1 | Agg. | Team 2 | 1st leg | 2nd leg |
|---|---|---|---|---|
| Bragadiru | 3–8 | Voința Crevedia II | 2–4 | 1–4 |

Voința Crevedia II won the Liga IV Ilfov County and qualified for the promotion play-off in Liga III.

=== Maramureș County ===
Team changes from the previous season

- Viitorul Ulmeni achieved promotion to Liga III.
- Viitorul Culcea-Săcălășeni (Series I winners) and Solaris Pribilești (Series II winners) declined promotion from Liga V Maramureș.
- Luceafărul Strâmtura, Tisa Sarasău, Unirea Săsar and Electrica Baia Mare withdrew.
- Rozalina Rozavlea withdrew during the previous season.
- Bradul Vișeu was reinstated after withdrew during the previous season.
- CSO Borșa and Plimob Sighetu Marmației were admitted upon request.

North Series

| Pos | Team | Pld | W | D | L | GF | GA | GD | Pts | Qualification or relegation |
|---|---|---|---|---|---|---|---|---|---|---|
| 1 | Avântul Bârsana (Q) | 20 | 17 | 1 | 2 | 89 | 22 | +67 | 52 | Qualification to championship final |
| 2 | Iza Dragomirești | 20 | 15 | 1 | 4 | 95 | 30 | +65 | 46 | |
| 3 | Recolta Săliștea de Sus | 20 | 13 | 1 | 6 | 63 | 30 | +33 | 40 | |
| 4 | Plimob Sighetu Marmației | 20 | 12 | 1 | 7 | 74 | 53 | +21 | 37 | |
| 5 | Bradul Vișeu | 20 | 10 | 3 | 7 | 44 | 39 | +5 | 33 | |
| 6 | Zorile Moisei | 20 | 9 | 5 | 6 | 43 | 34 | +9 | 32 | |
| 7 | Metalul Bogdan Vodă | 20 | 5 | 3 | 12 | 38 | 58 | −20 | 18 | |
| 8 | Remeți | 20 | 5 | 3 | 12 | 38 | 67 | −29 | 18 | |
| 9 | Borșa | 20 | 4 | 3 | 13 | 38 | 91 | −53 | 15 | |
| 10 | Salina Ocna Șugatag | 20 | 3 | 5 | 12 | 37 | 85 | −48 | 14 | |
| 11 | Foresta Câmpulung la Tisa | 20 | 3 | 2 | 15 | 25 | 75 | −50 | 11 | |

Rules for classification: 1) Points; 2) Head-to-head points; 3) Head-to-head goal difference; 4) Head-to-head goals scored; 5) Head-to-head away goals scored; 6) Goal difference; 7) Goals scored.
(Q) Qualified for the phase indicated

South Series

| Pos | Team | Pld | W | D | L | GF | GA | GD | Pts | Qualification or relegation |
|---|---|---|---|---|---|---|---|---|---|---|
| 1 | Lăpușul Târgu Lăpuș (Q) | 16 | 12 | 3 | 1 | 58 | 13 | +45 | 39 | Qualification to championship final |
| 2 | Fărcașa | 16 | 9 | 3 | 4 | 47 | 27 | +20 | 30 | |
| 3 | Progresul Șomcuta Mare | 16 | 9 | 2 | 5 | 55 | 27 | +28 | 29 | |
| 4 | Progresul Dumbrăvița | 16 | 9 | 1 | 6 | 42 | 27 | +15 | 28 | |
| 5 | Unirea Șișești | 16 | 9 | 1 | 6 | 42 | 41 | +1 | 28 | |
| 6 | Gloria Chechiș | 16 | 6 | 4 | 6 | 30 | 29 | +1 | 22 | |
| 7 | Seini | 16 | 4 | 3 | 9 | 25 | 44 | −19 | 15 | |
| 8 | Comuna Satulung | 16 | 4 | 1 | 11 | 22 | 63 | −41 | 13 | |
| 9 | Minerul Cavnic | 16 | 0 | 2 | 14 | 10 | 60 | −50 | 2 (Note: Minerul Cavnic withdrew in the second part of the season and lost all remaining matches with 0–3.) | |

Rules for classification: 1) Points; 2) Head-to-head points; 3) Head-to-head goal difference; 4) Head-to-head goals scored; 5) Head-to-head away goals scored; 6) Goal difference; 7) Goals scored.
(Q) Qualified for the phase indicated
Notes:

Championship final

The match was played on 10 June 2017 at Viorel Mateianu Stadium in Baia Mare.

| Team 1 | Score | Team 2 |
|---|---|---|
| Lăpușul Târgu Lăpuș | 3–0 | Avântul Bârsana |

Lăpușul Târgu Lăpuș won the Liga IV Maramureș County and qualified for the promotion play-off in Liga III.

=== Mehedinți County ===
The Liga IV Mehedinți County was played in a double round-robin format with eight teams, followed by a championship play-off for the top four teams and a play-out for the bottom four, both contested in a double round-robin format, with teams starting with half of their regular season points, rounded up, and no other records carried over.

Team changes from the previous season

- Real Vânju Mare (winners) and Dunărea Hinova (runners-up) declined promotion from Liga V Mehedinți.
- Pandurii Cerneți, Coșuștea Căzănești and Dunărea Gruia withdrew.
- FC Drobeta 2013, Dierna Orșova and Dunărea Pristol were admitted upon request.

| Pos | Team | Pld | W | D | L | GF | GA | GD | Pts | Qualification or relegation |
|---|---|---|---|---|---|---|---|---|---|---|
| 1 | Viitorul Șimian | 14 | 12 | 0 | 2 | 42 | 12 | +30 | 36 | Qualification to championship play-off |
| 2 | Strehaia | 14 | 8 | 2 | 4 | 27 | 16 | +11 | 26 | Qualification to championship play-off |
| 3 | Drobeta 2013 | 14 | 8 | 2 | 4 | 20 | 12 | +8 | 26 | Qualification to championship play-off |
| 4 | Dierna Orșova | 14 | 6 | 1 | 7 | 25 | 30 | −5 | 19 | Qualification to championship play-off |
| 5 | Recolta Dănceu | 14 | 5 | 3 | 6 | 28 | 26 | +2 | 18 | Qualification to championship play-out |
| 6 | Viitorul Cujmir | 14 | 5 | 2 | 7 | 18 | 22 | −4 | 17 | Qualification to championship play-out |
| 7 | Dunărea Pristol | 14 | 3 | 5 | 6 | 22 | 34 | −12 | 14 | Qualification to championship play-out |
| 8 | Corcova | 14 | 1 | 1 | 12 | 12 | 42 | −30 | 4 | Qualification to championship play-out |

Rules for classification: 1) Points; 2) Head-to-head points; 3) Head-to-head goal difference; 4) Head-to-head goals scored; 5) Head-to-head away goals scored; 6) Goal difference; 7) Goals scored.

Championship play-off

| Pos | Team | Pld | W | D | L | GF | GA | GD | Pts | Qualification |
|---|---|---|---|---|---|---|---|---|---|---|
| 1 | Strehaia (C, Q) | 6 | 4 | 0 | 2 | 11 | 6 | +5 | 25 | Qualification to promotion play-off |
| 2 | Viitorul Șimian | 6 | 2 | 1 | 3 | 7 | 8 | −1 | 25 | |
| 3 | Drobeta 2013 | 6 | 2 | 1 | 3 | 8 | 8 | 0 | 20 | |
| 4 | Dierna Orșova | 6 | 3 | 0 | 3 | 7 | 11 | −4 | 19 | |

Rules for classification: 1) Points; 2) Head-to-head points; 3) Head-to-head goal difference; 4) Head-to-head goals scored; 5) Head-to-head away goals scored; 6) Goal difference; 7) Goals scored.
(C) Champions; (Q) Qualified for the phase indicated

Championship play-out

| Pos | Team | Pld | W | D | L | GF | GA | GD | Pts |
|---|---|---|---|---|---|---|---|---|---|
| 5 | Recolta Dănceu | 6 | 5 | 1 | 0 | 23 | 7 | +16 | 25 |
| 6 | Viitorul Cujmir | 6 | 2 | 1 | 3 | 14 | 14 | 0 | 16 |
| 7 | Corcova | 6 | 3 | 0 | 3 | 18 | 18 | 0 | 11 |
| 8 | Dunărea Pristol | 6 | 1 | 0 | 5 | 6 | 22 | −16 | 10 |

Rules for classification: 1) Points; 2) Head-to-head points; 3) Head-to-head goal difference; 4) Head-to-head goals scored; 5) Head-to-head away goals scored; 6) Goal difference; 7) Goals scored.

=== Mureș County ===
Team changes from the previous season

- ASA Târgu Mureș II was enrolled upon request in Liga III.
- Unirea Tricolor Târnăveni (16th place) and Arena Sighișoara (18th place) were relegated to Liga V Mureș.
- Atletico Bălăușeri (Series I winners) and Gloria Goreni (Series II winners) declined promotion from Liga V Mureș.
- Rază de Soare Acățari was spared from relegation.
- Juvenes Târgu Mureș was admitted upon request.

| Pos | Team | Pld | W | D | L | GF | GA | GD | Pts | Qualification or relegation |
|---|---|---|---|---|---|---|---|---|---|---|
| 1 | Mureșul Rușii-Munți (C, Q) | 28 | 24 | 1 | 3 | 88 | 27 | +61 | 73 | Qualification to promotion play-off |
| 2 | Mureșul Luduș | 28 | 21 | 4 | 3 | 111 | 31 | +80 | 67 | |
| 3 | Juvenes Târgu Mureș | 28 | 18 | 6 | 4 | 79 | 38 | +41 | 60 | |
| 4 | MSE 08 Târgu Mureș | 28 | 18 | 3 | 7 | 97 | 54 | +43 | 57 | |
| 5 | Miercurea Nirajului | 28 | 14 | 3 | 11 | 82 | 67 | +15 | 45 | |
| 6 | Lacul Ursu Mobila Sovata | 28 | 14 | 3 | 11 | 68 | 54 | +14 | 45 | |
| 7 | Târnava Mică Sângeorgiu de Pădure | 28 | 13 | 5 | 10 | 72 | 60 | +12 | 44 | |
| 8 | Atletic Târgu Mureș | 28 | 12 | 3 | 13 | 74 | 59 | +15 | 39 | |
| 9 | Viitorul Ungheni | 28 | 12 | 1 | 15 | 57 | 63 | −6 | 37 | |
| 10 | Gaz Metan Târgu Mureș | 28 | 10 | 2 | 16 | 51 | 83 | −32 | 32 | |
| 11 | Mureșul Nazna | 28 | 8 | 1 | 19 | 30 | 85 | −55 | 25 | |
| 12 | Gaz Metan Daneș | 28 | 8 | 1 | 19 | 47 | 107 | −60 | 25 | |
| 13 | Mureșul Cuci | 28 | 7 | 3 | 18 | 47 | 83 | −36 | 24 | |
| 14 | Sărmașu | 28 | 5 | 8 | 15 | 41 | 76 | −35 | 23 | |
| 15 | Rază de Soare Acățari (R) | 28 | 3 | 2 | 23 | 36 | 93 | −57 | 11 | Relegation to Liga V Mureș |
| 16 | Avântul Miheșu de Câmpie (R) | 0 | 0 | 0 | 0 | 0 | 0 | 0 | 0 (Note: Avântul Miheșu de Câmpie withdrew after 2 rounds and all its results were canceled.) | Withdrew |

Rules for classification: 1) Points; 2) Head-to-head points; 3) Head-to-head goal difference; 4) Head-to-head goals scored; 5) Head-to-head away goals scored; 6) Goal difference; 7) Goals scored.
(C) Champions; (Q) Qualified for the phase indicated; (R) Relegated

=== Neamț County ===
The Liga IV Neamț County was played in a double round-robin format, with the top four teams advancing to the championship play-off, which was contested in a single round-robin tournament. The teams started the play-off with the following points: 1st place – 3 points, 2nd place – 2 points, 3rd place – 1 point, and 4th place – 0 points.

Team changes from the previous season

- Vulturul Costișa (Series II winners) was promoted from Liga V Neamț.
- Voința Bozieni (Series I winners) declined promotion from Liga V Neamț.
- Unirea Tămășeni and LPS Piatra Neamț were spared from relegation.
- Victoria Horia and Voința Rediu withdrew.
- Steel-Man Târgu Neamț was admitted upon request.

| Pos | Team | Pld | W | D | L | GF | GA | GD | Pts | Qualification or relegation |
|---|---|---|---|---|---|---|---|---|---|---|
| 1 | Teiul Poiana Teiului | 28 | 25 | 1 | 2 | 114 | 21 | +93 | 76 | Qualification to championship play-off |
| 2 | Bradul Borca | 28 | 24 | 2 | 2 | 106 | 25 | +81 | 74 | Qualification to championship play-off |
| 3 | Speranța Răucești | 28 | 20 | 3 | 5 | 100 | 30 | +70 | 63 | Qualification to championship play-off |
| 4 | Moldova Cordun | 28 | 18 | 3 | 7 | 79 | 37 | +42 | 57 | Qualification to championship play-off |
| 5 | Cimentul Bicaz | 28 | 16 | 4 | 8 | 93 | 36 | +57 | 52 | |
| 6 | Voința Ion Creangă | 28 | 16 | 4 | 8 | 79 | 49 | +30 | 52 | |
| 7 | Bradul Roznov | 28 | 16 | 3 | 9 | 80 | 39 | +41 | 51 | |
| 8 | Vulturul Costișa | 28 | 12 | 3 | 13 | 62 | 56 | +6 | 39 | |
| 9 | Steel-Man Târgu Neamț | 28 | 9 | 3 | 16 | 51 | 76 | −25 | 30 | |
| 10 | Zimbrul Vânători-Neamț | 28 | 8 | 5 | 15 | 50 | 82 | −32 | 29 | |
| 11 | Tineretul Cândești | 25 | 6 | 4 | 15 | 38 | 62 | −24 | 22 (Note: Tineretul Cândești, Unirea Tămășeni, Voința Dobreni and Zimbrul Pâncești withdrew in the second part of the season and lost all the remaining matches with 0–3.) | |
| 12 | Unirea Tămășeni | 25 | 6 | 2 | 17 | 34 | 57 | −23 | 20 | |
| 13 | LPS Piatra Neamț | 28 | 6 | 0 | 22 | 38 | 166 | −128 | 18 | |
| 14 | Voința Dobreni | 25 | 2 | 0 | 23 | 10 | 108 | −98 | 6 | |
| 15 | Zimbrul Pâncești | 25 | 1 | 1 | 23 | 12 | 102 | −90 | 4 | |
| 16 | LPS Roman (D) | 0 | 0 | 0 | 0 | 0 | 0 | 0 | 0 (Note: LPS Roman withdrew after 4 rounds and all its results were canceled.) | Withdrew |

Rules for classification: 1) Points; 2) Head-to-head points; 3) Head-to-head goal difference; 4) Head-to-head goals scored; 5) Head-to-head away goals scored; 6) Goal difference; 7) Goals scored.
(D) Disqualified
Notes:

Championship play-off

All matches were played at Bradul Stadium in Roznov.

| Pos | Team | Pld | W | D | L | GF | GA | GD | Pts | Qualification | TPT | BBO | SPR | MCO |
|---|---|---|---|---|---|---|---|---|---|---|---|---|---|---|
| 1 | Teiul Poiana Teiului (C, Q) | 3 | 3 | 0 | 0 | 13 | 2 | +11 | 12 | Qualification for promotion play-off | — | 4–1 | 3–1 | 6–0 |
| 2 | Bradul Borca | 3 | 1 | 1 | 1 | 9 | 8 | +1 | 6 | | — | — | 2–2 | 6–2 |
| 3 | Speranța Răucești | 3 | 1 | 1 | 1 | 8 | 7 | +1 | 5 | | — | — | — | 5–2 |
| 4 | Moldova Cordun | 3 | 0 | 0 | 3 | 4 | 17 | −13 | 0 | | — | — | — | — |

Legend: Blue = home team win; Yellow = draw; Red = away team win.
Rules for classification: 1) Points; 2) Head-to-head points; 3) Head-to-head goal difference; 4) Head-to-head goals scored; 5) Head-to-head away goals scored; 6) Goal difference; 7) Goals scored.
(C) Champions; (Q) Qualified for the phase indicated

=== Olt County ===
Team changes from the previous season.

- CSȘ Slatina, Oltețul Osica, Romanați Caracal and Juventus Slatina were admitted upon request.
- Unirea Bărăști (Series I winners), Gloria Bistrița (Series II winners), Valea Oltului Ipotești (Series III winners), Valea Oltului Cilieni (Series IV winners), and Dunărea Corabia (Series V winners) declined promotion from Liga V Olt.

| Pos | Team | Pld | W | D | L | GF | GA | GD | Pts | Qualification or relegation |
|---|---|---|---|---|---|---|---|---|---|---|
| 1 | Milcov (C, Q) | 26 | 24 | 0 | 2 | 118 | 22 | +96 | 72 | Qualification to promotion play-off |
| 2 | Voința Băbiciu | 26 | 21 | 1 | 4 | 86 | 28 | +58 | 64 | |
| 3 | Vedea Văleni Nicolae Titulescu | 26 | 20 | 1 | 5 | 90 | 39 | +51 | 61 | |
| 4 | Juventus Slatina | 26 | 17 | 2 | 7 | 87 | 42 | +45 | 53 | |
| 5 | Vedița Colonești | 26 | 13 | 4 | 9 | 72 | 53 | +19 | 43 | |
| 6 | Viitorul Grădinile | 26 | 13 | 2 | 11 | 56 | 58 | −2 | 41 | |
| 7 | Petrolul Potcoava | 26 | 11 | 2 | 13 | 53 | 54 | −1 | 35 | |
| 8 | Oltul Curtișoara | 26 | 11 | 1 | 14 | 44 | 63 | −19 | 34 | |
| 9 | Avântul Coteana | 26 | 10 | 3 | 13 | 46 | 49 | −3 | 33 | |
| 10 | CSȘ Slatina | 26 | 9 | 1 | 16 | 58 | 74 | −16 | 28 | |
| 11 | Romanați Caracal | 26 | 7 | 3 | 16 | 51 | 65 | −14 | 24 | |
| 12 | Olt Scornicești | 26 | 5 | 4 | 17 | 41 | 96 | −55 | 19 | |
| 13 | Oltețul Osica | 26 | 4 | 2 | 20 | 37 | 103 | −66 | 14 | |
| 14 | Viitorul Rusănești | 26 | 2 | 4 | 20 | 18 | 111 | −93 | 10 | |
| 15 | Recolta Stoicănești (D) | 0 | 0 | 0 | 0 | 0 | 0 | 0 | 0 (Note: Recolta Stoicănești withdrew from the championship after 6 rounds and all the results were canceled.) | Expelled |
| 16 | Victoria Dobrun (D) | 0 | 0 | 0 | 0 | 0 | 0 | 0 | 0 (Note: Victoria Dobrun withdrew from the championship after 3 rounds and all the results were canceled.) | Expelled |

Rules for classification: 1) Points; 2) Head-to-head points; 3) Head-to-head goal difference; 4) Head-to-head goals scored; 5) Head-to-head away goals scored; 6) Goal difference; 7) Goals scored.
(C) Champions; (D) Disqualified; (Q) Qualified for the phase indicated

=== Prahova County ===
Team changes from the previous season

- CS Păulești declined promotion to Liga III.
- Petrolul Băicoi (winners) and Cetatea Coada Izvorului (runners-up) were promoted from Liga V Prahova
- Voința Găzarul Surani (16th place) was relegated to Liga V Prahova.
- Astra II Ciorani and Progresul Drăgănești withdrew.
- Unirea Urlați (15th place) was spared from relegation.
- Cetatea Coada Izvorului was renamed Mănești Coada Izvorului

| Pos | Team | Pld | W | D | L | GF | GA | GD | Pts | Qualification or relegation |
|---|---|---|---|---|---|---|---|---|---|---|
| 1 | Petrolul Ploiești (C, Q) | 30 | 25 | 5 | 0 | 125 | 11 | +114 | 80 | Qualification to promotion play-off |
| 2 | Blejoi | 30 | 22 | 3 | 5 | 96 | 32 | +64 | 69 | |
| 3 | Bănești-Urleta | 30 | 21 | 3 | 6 | 98 | 30 | +68 | 66 | |
| 4 | Păulești | 30 | 17 | 8 | 5 | 104 | 39 | +65 | 59 | |
| 5 | Plopeni | 30 | 15 | 6 | 9 | 84 | 56 | +28 | 51 | |
| 6 | Cornu | 30 | 15 | 5 | 10 | 62 | 56 | +6 | 50 | |
| 7 | Petrolul Băicoi | 30 | 13 | 8 | 9 | 47 | 35 | +12 | 47 | |
| 8 | Teleajenul Vălenii de Munte | 30 | 12 | 8 | 10 | 58 | 58 | 0 | 44 | |
| 9 | Avântul Măneciu | 30 | 14 | 1 | 15 | 48 | 67 | −19 | 43 | |
| 10 | Mănești Coada Izvorului | 30 | 9 | 8 | 13 | 53 | 85 | −32 | 35 | |
| 11 | Brebu | 30 | 9 | 6 | 15 | 54 | 70 | −16 | 33 (Note: Brebu–Tricolorul Breaza 1–2; Tricolorul Breaza–Brebu 0–1.) | |
| 12 | Tricolorul Breaza | 30 | 9 | 6 | 15 | 36 | 65 | −29 | 33 | |
| 13 | Ceptura | 30 | 10 | 2 | 18 | 69 | 96 | −27 | 32 | |
| 14 | Tufeni Băicoi | 30 | 5 | 4 | 21 | 49 | 108 | −59 | 19 | |
| 15 | Unirea Urlați (R) | 30 | 3 | 2 | 25 | 24 | 107 | −83 | 11 | Relegation to Liga V Prahova |
| 16 | Unirea Cocorăștii Colț (R) | 30 | 1 | 5 | 24 | 36 | 128 | −92 | 8 | Relegation to Liga V Prahova |

Rules for classification: 1) Points; 2) Head-to-head points; 3) Head-to-head goal difference; 4) Head-to-head goals scored; 5) Head-to-head away goals scored; 6) Goal difference; 7) Goals scored.
(C) Champions; (Q) Qualified for the phase indicated; (R) Relegated

=== Satu Mare County ===
Team changes from the previous season

- Recolta Dorolț achieved promotion to Liga III.
- Victoria Apa (Series A winners) and Energia Negrești-Oaș (Series A runners-up) were promoted from Liga V Satu Mare.
- Real Andrid (Series B winners) and Schwaben Kalmandi Cămin (Series B runners-up) declined promotion from Liga V Satu Mare.
- Someșul Oar and Cetate 2010 Ardud withdrew.
- Știința Beltiug (13th place) was spared from relegation.
- Recolta Dorolț II was admitted upon request.

| Pos | Team | Pld | W | D | L | GF | GA | GD | Pts | Qualification or relegation |
|---|---|---|---|---|---|---|---|---|---|---|
| 1 | Unirea Tășnad (C, Q) | 22 | 18 | 3 | 1 | 71 | 15 | +56 | 57 | Qualification to promotion play-off |
| 2 | Victoria Carei | 22 | 15 | 2 | 5 | 52 | 24 | +28 | 47 | |
| 3 | Luceafărul Decebal | 22 | 15 | 1 | 6 | 53 | 28 | +25 | 46 | |
| 4 | Energia Negrești-Oaș | 22 | 14 | 3 | 5 | 50 | 31 | +19 | 45 | |
| 5 | Talna Orașu Nou | 22 | 13 | 2 | 7 | 60 | 42 | +18 | 41 | |
| 6 | Știința Beltiug | 22 | 10 | 3 | 9 | 49 | 28 | +21 | 33 | |
| 7 | Voința Doba | 21 | 10 | 0 | 11 | 43 | 58 | −15 | 30 | |
| 8 | Turul Micula | 22 | 8 | 2 | 12 | 44 | 53 | −9 | 26 | |
| 9 | Crasna Moftinu Mare | 22 | 7 | 1 | 14 | 45 | 44 | +1 | 22 | |
| 10 | Recolta Dorolț II | 21 | 6 | 2 | 13 | 47 | 53 | −6 | 20 | |
| 11 | Victoria Apa | 22 | 5 | 1 | 16 | 28 | 82 | −54 | 16 | |
| 12 | Viitorul Vetiș | 22 | 0 | 0 | 22 | 12 | 96 | −84 | 0 | |

Rules for classification: 1) Points; 2) Head-to-head points; 3) Head-to-head goal difference; 4) Head-to-head goals scored; 5) Head-to-head away goals scored; 6) Goal difference; 7) Goals scored.
(C) Champions; (Q) Qualified for the phase indicated

=== Sălaj County ===
Team changes from the previous season

- Cetatea Buciumi (East Series winners) and Inter Pericei (West Series winners) were promoted from Liga V Sălaj.
- Sportul Șimleu Silvaniei (13th place) and Benfica Ileanda (14th place) were spared from relegation.
- Gloria Ban withdrew.
- Real Crișeni was admitted upon request.

| Pos | Team | Pld | W | D | L | GF | GA | GD | Pts | Qualification or relegation |
|---|---|---|---|---|---|---|---|---|---|---|
| 1 | Dumbrava Gâlgău Almașului (C, Q) | 28 | 23 | 2 | 3 | 131 | 25 | +106 | 71 | Qualification to promotion play-off |
| 2 | Rapid Jibou | 28 | 22 | 4 | 2 | 103 | 33 | +70 | 70 | |
| 3 | Unirea Mirșid | 28 | 22 | 2 | 4 | 171 | 35 | +136 | 68 | |
| 4 | Flacăra Halmășd | 28 | 20 | 4 | 4 | 106 | 46 | +60 | 64 | |
| 5 | Barcău Nușfalău | 28 | 16 | 10 | 2 | 96 | 39 | +57 | 58 | |
| 6 | Crasna | 28 | 12 | 5 | 11 | 57 | 47 | +10 | 41 | |
| 7 | Sportul Șimleu Silvaniei | 28 | 12 | 3 | 13 | 67 | 82 | −15 | 39 | |
| 8 | Cetatea Buciumi | 28 | 10 | 6 | 12 | 71 | 75 | −4 | 36 | |
| 9 | Olimpic Bocșa | 28 | 10 | 3 | 15 | 65 | 86 | −21 | 33 | |
| 10 | Silvania Cehu Silvaniei | 28 | 10 | 2 | 16 | 64 | 76 | −12 | 32 | |
| 11 | Hida | 28 | 8 | 2 | 18 | 52 | 100 | −48 | 26 | |
| 12 | Benfica Ileanda | 28 | 6 | 4 | 18 | 35 | 82 | −47 | 22 | |
| 13 | Real Crișeni | 28 | 4 | 6 | 18 | 47 | 89 | −42 | 18 | |
| 14 | Chieșd | 28 | 5 | 3 | 20 | 45 | 149 | −104 | 18 | |
| 15 | Inter Pericei | 28 | 1 | 2 | 25 | 28 | 174 | −146 | 5 | |
| 16 | Gloria Bobota (D) | 0 | 0 | 0 | 0 | 0 | 0 | 0 | 0 (Note: Gloria Bobota withdrew in the first part of the season and all its results were canceled.) | Withdrew |

Rules for classification: 1) Points; 2) Head-to-head points; 3) Head-to-head goal difference; 4) Head-to-head goals scored; 5) Head-to-head away goals scored; 6) Goal difference; 7) Goals scored.
(C) Champions; (D) Disqualified; (Q) Qualified for the phase indicated

=== Sibiu County ===
Team changes from the previous season

- AFC Hermannstadt achieved promotion to Liga III.
- Măgura Cisnădie withdrew from Liga III and was enrolled in Liga IV Sibiu.
- Sion Săliște (Sibiu Series II winners) was promoted from Liga V Sibiu.
- Vulturul Poplaca (Sibiu Series I winners) and Gloria Smig (Mediaș Series winners) declined promotion from Liga V Sibiu
- Măgura Cisnădie II was disbanded following the enrollment of the first team in Liga IV Sibiu.
- AFC Hermannstadt II, Athletic Șura Mare and Viitorul Șelimbăr were admitted upon request.

| Pos | Team | Pld | W | D | L | GF | GA | GD | Pts | Qualification or relegation |
|---|---|---|---|---|---|---|---|---|---|---|
| 1 | Avrig (C, Q) | 28 | 26 | 1 | 1 | 155 | 10 | +145 | 79 | Qualification to promotion play-off |
| 2 | Păltiniș Rășinari | 28 | 24 | 2 | 2 | 145 | 35 | +110 | 74 | |
| 3 | Măgura Cisnădie | 28 | 23 | 1 | 4 | 154 | 26 | +128 | 70 | |
| 4 | Hermannstadt II | 28 | 21 | 1 | 6 | 123 | 36 | +87 | 64 | |
| 5 | Unirea Miercurea Sibiului | 28 | 20 | 2 | 6 | 115 | 45 | +70 | 62 | |
| 6 | Viitorul Șelimbăr | 28 | 15 | 2 | 11 | 77 | 52 | +25 | 47 | |
| 7 | Voința Sibiu | 28 | 13 | 2 | 13 | 93 | 78 | +15 | 41 | |
| 8 | Agnita | 28 | 12 | 4 | 12 | 64 | 58 | +6 | 40 | |
| 9 | Progresul Terezian Sibiu | 28 | 9 | 6 | 13 | 51 | 102 | −51 | 33 | |
| 10 | Tălmaciu | 28 | 10 | 1 | 17 | 51 | 73 | −22 | 31 | |
| 11 | Sparta Mediaș | 28 | 9 | 1 | 18 | 62 | 140 | −78 | 28 | |
| 12 | Athletic Șura Mare | 28 | 7 | 2 | 19 | 45 | 129 | −84 | 23 | |
| 13 | ASA Sibiu | 28 | 4 | 1 | 23 | 32 | 141 | −109 | 13 | |
| 14 | Sion Săliște (R) | 28 | 3 | 2 | 23 | 41 | 140 | −99 | 11 | Relegation to Liga V Sibiu |
| 15 | Continental Sibiu (Note: Continental Sibiu withdrew during the winter break and lost all matches from the second half of the season with 0–3.) (R) | 28 | 0 | 0 | 28 | 10 | 153 | −143 | 0 | Relegation to Liga V Sibiu |

Rules for classification: 1) Points; 2) Head-to-head points; 3) Head-to-head goal difference; 4) Head-to-head goals scored; 5) Head-to-head away goals scored; 6) Goal difference; 7) Goals scored.
(C) Champions; (Q) Qualified for the phase indicated; (R) Relegated

=== Suceava County ===
Team changes from the previous season

- Bucovina Rădăuți was relegated from Liga III.
- Viitorul Verești (13th place) and Știința Vicovu de Sus (14th place) were relegated to Liga V Suceava.
- Bucovina Rădăuți II was demoted to Liga V Suceava following the relegation of the first team.
- Forestierul Frumosu (West Series winners) was promoted from Liga V Suceava.
- Voința Zvoriștea (East Series winners) declined promotion from Liga V Suceava.
- Dorna Vatra Dornei withdrew.
- Stejarul Cajvana and Avântul Volovăț were admitted upon request.
- Rapid II Siret was renamed Foresta II Siret.

| Pos | Team | Pld | W | D | L | GF | GA | GD | Pts | Qualification or relegation |
|---|---|---|---|---|---|---|---|---|---|---|
| 1 | Bucovina Rădăuți (C, Q) | 26 | 23 | 3 | 0 | 86 | 2 | +84 | 72 | Qualification to promotion play-off |
| 2 | Viitorul Liteni | 26 | 19 | 1 | 6 | 80 | 34 | +46 | 58 | |
| 3 | Progresul Frătăuții Vechi | 26 | 18 | 3 | 5 | 60 | 19 | +41 | 57 | |
| 4 | Șomuz Fălticeni | 26 | 16 | 4 | 6 | 65 | 28 | +37 | 52 | |
| 5 | Șomuzul Preutești | 26 | 14 | 4 | 8 | 75 | 52 | +23 | 46 | |
| 6 | Foresta II Siret | 26 | 11 | 3 | 12 | 48 | 48 | 0 | 36 | |
| 7 | Stejarul Cajvana | 26 | 11 | 2 | 13 | 56 | 95 | −39 | 35 | |
| 8 | Moldova Drăgușeni | 26 | 12 | 2 | 12 | 48 | 58 | −10 | 32 (Note: Moldova Drăgușeni deducted 6 points.) | |
| 9 | Forestierul Frumosu | 26 | 9 | 2 | 15 | 48 | 87 | −39 | 29 | |
| 10 | Victoria Vatra Moldoviței | 26 | 8 | 4 | 14 | 38 | 61 | −23 | 28 | |
| 11 | Recolta Fântânele | 26 | 8 | 1 | 17 | 46 | 63 | −17 | 25 | |
| 12 | Gura Humorului | 26 | 7 | 2 | 17 | 33 | 60 | −27 | 23 | |
| 13 | Bradul Putna (R) | 26 | 7 | 0 | 19 | 43 | 57 | −14 | 21 (Note: Bradul Putna and Avântul Volovăț were withdrew during the winter break and lost all the matches from the second part of the season with 0–3.) | Relegation to Liga V Suceava |
| 14 | Avântul Volovăț (R) | 26 | 3 | 1 | 22 | 20 | 82 | −62 | 10 | Relegation to Liga V Suceava |

Rules for classification: 1) Points; 2) Head-to-head points; 3) Head-to-head goal difference; 4) Head-to-head goals scored; 5) Head-to-head away goals scored; 6) Goal difference; 7) Goals scored.
(C) Champions; (Q) Qualified for the phase indicated; (R) Relegated

=== Teleorman County ===
Team changes from the previous season

- FCM Alexandria achieved promotion to Liga III.
- Metalul Frăsinet (15th place; withdrew) and Spicpo Poroschia (16th place; withdrew) were relegated to Liga V Teleorman.
- Tineretul Siliștea (Series I winners) and Ajax Botoroaga (Series II winners) were promoted from Liga V Teleorman.
- Avântul Stejaru (Series I runners-up and promotion play-off winners) (Note: Avântul Stejaru defeated Valea Dunării Pietroșani, 2–0, the runners-up of Series II, in the promotion play-off.) declined promotion from Liga V Teleorman.
- Dunărea Zimnicea withdrew.
- ACS Drăgănești-Vlașca was admitted upon request.

| Pos | Team | Pld | W | D | L | GF | GA | GD | Pts | Qualification or relegation |
|---|---|---|---|---|---|---|---|---|---|---|
| 1 | Voința Saelele (C, Q) | 28 | 24 | 4 | 0 | 135 | 12 | +123 | 76 | Qualification to promotion play-off |
| 2 | Viață Nouă Olteni | 28 | 18 | 4 | 6 | 91 | 32 | +59 | 58 | |
| 3 | Ajax Botoroaga | 28 | 17 | 3 | 8 | 73 | 56 | +17 | 54 | |
| 4 | Rapid Buzescu | 28 | 15 | 8 | 5 | 86 | 35 | +51 | 53 | |
| 5 | Unirea Țigănești | 28 | 14 | 7 | 7 | 77 | 47 | +30 | 49 | |
| 6 | Avântul Bragadiru | 28 | 14 | 0 | 14 | 76 | 66 | +10 | 42 | |
| 7 | Astra Plosca | 28 | 12 | 4 | 12 | 84 | 62 | +22 | 40 | |
| 8 | Seaca | 28 | 12 | 4 | 12 | 56 | 53 | +3 | 40 | |
| 9 | Unirea Brânceni (R) | 28 | 13 | 0 | 15 | 63 | 59 | +4 | 39 (Note: Unirea Brânceni withdrew after 15 rounds, lost all remaining matches with 0–3 and relegated.) | Relegation to Liga V Teleorman |
| 10 | Unirea Petrolul Videle | 28 | 10 | 3 | 15 | 54 | 84 | −30 | 33 | |
| 11 | Metalul Peretu | 28 | 9 | 2 | 17 | 59 | 74 | −15 | 29 | |
| 12 | Tineretul Siliștea | 28 | 8 | 5 | 15 | 53 | 102 | −49 | 29 | |
| 13 | Atletic Orbeasca | 28 | 8 | 3 | 17 | 48 | 86 | −38 | 27 | |
| 14 | Drăgănești-Vlașca | 28 | 8 | 1 | 19 | 55 | 105 | −50 | 25 | |
| 15 | Nanov | 28 | 3 | 2 | 23 | 37 | 174 | −137 | 11 | Spared from relegation |

Rules for classification: 1) Points; 2) Head-to-head points; 3) Head-to-head goal difference; 4) Head-to-head goals scored; 5) Head-to-head away goals scored; 6) Goal difference; 7) Goals scored.
(C) Champions; (Q) Qualified for the phase indicated; (R) Relegated

=== Timiș County ===
Team changes from the previous season

- Ripensia Timișoara achieved promotion to Liga III.
- CFR Timișoara (17th place) and Lorena Giarmata-Vii (18th place; withdrew) were relegated to Liga V Timiș.
- AS Seceani (Series I winners), Unirea Banloc (Series II winners) and CSM Lugoj II (Series III winners) were promoted from Liga V Timiș.
- Poli Timișoara II was enrolled upon request in Liga III.
- Progresul 1906 Ciacova was admitted upon request.

| Pos | Team | Pld | W | D | L | GF | GA | GD | Pts | Qualification or relegation |
|---|---|---|---|---|---|---|---|---|---|---|
| 1 | Ghiroda (C, Q) | 34 | 27 | 5 | 2 | 138 | 39 | +99 | 86 | Qualification to promotion play-off |
| 2 | Voința Biled | 34 | 23 | 3 | 8 | 99 | 54 | +45 | 72 | |
| 3 | Pobeda Dudeștii Vechi | 34 | 21 | 7 | 6 | 83 | 40 | +43 | 70 | |
| 4 | Lugoj II | 34 | 23 | 2 | 9 | 83 | 46 | +37 | 68 (Note: Lugoj II deducted 3 points.) | |
| 5 | Voința Mașloc | 34 | 21 | 4 | 9 | 93 | 47 | +46 | 67 | |
| 6 | Dumbrăvița | 34 | 18 | 7 | 9 | 85 | 44 | +41 | 61 | |
| 7 | Avântul Periam | 34 | 17 | 7 | 10 | 84 | 61 | +23 | 58 | |
| 8 | Cocoșul Orțișoara | 34 | 15 | 3 | 16 | 67 | 62 | +5 | 48 | |
| 9 | Unirea Sânnicolau Mare | 34 | 13 | 8 | 13 | 59 | 42 | +17 | 47 | |
| 10 | Murani | 34 | 15 | 2 | 17 | 74 | 97 | −23 | 47 | |
| 11 | Seceani | 34 | 13 | 4 | 17 | 62 | 70 | −8 | 43 | |
| 12 | Timișul Șag | 34 | 10 | 10 | 14 | 57 | 61 | −4 | 40 | |
| 13 | Progresul Gătaia | 34 | 11 | 3 | 20 | 74 | 115 | −41 | 36 | |
| 14 | Arsenal Flacăra Făget | 34 | 11 | 3 | 20 | 76 | 98 | −22 | 36 | |
| 15 | Progresul 1906 Ciacova | 34 | 10 | 5 | 19 | 42 | 86 | −44 | 35 | |
| 16 | Peciu Nou (Note: Peciu Nou was spared from relegation due to the promotion of Ghiroda to Liga III.) | 34 | 10 | 4 | 20 | 45 | 88 | −43 | 34 | Spared from relegation |
| 17 | Unirea Banloc (R) | 34 | 8 | 1 | 25 | 55 | 115 | −60 | 25 | Relegation to Liga V Timiș |
| 18 | Marcel Băban Jimbolia (R) | 34 | 1 | 0 | 33 | 16 | 127 | −111 | 3 (Note: Marcel Băban Jimbolia withdrew and lost all the matches from the second half with 0–3.) | Relegation to Liga V Timiș |

Rules for classification: 1) Points; 2) Head-to-head points; 3) Head-to-head goal difference; 4) Head-to-head goals scored; 5) Head-to-head away goals scored; 6) Goal difference; 7) Goals scored.
(C) Champions; (Q) Qualified for the phase indicated; (R) Relegated

=== Tulcea County ===
Team changes from the previous season

- Viitorul Frecăței, Izbânda Mihail Kogălniceanu, Tractorul Horia, Național Somova, Heracleea Enisala, Beroe Ostrov, Egreta Sabangia, Sarica Niculițel and Triumful Turda were promoted from Liga V Tulcea.
- Racheta Dăeni, Delta Aegyssus Tulcea, Gloria Agighiol, Laguna Ceamurlia de Jos, Luceafărul Slava Cercheză were admitted upon request.

Series A

| Pos | Team | Pld | W | D | L | GF | GA | GD | Pts | Qualification or relegation |
|---|---|---|---|---|---|---|---|---|---|---|
| 1 | Șoimii Topolog (Q) | 18 | 17 | 1 | 0 | 103 | 18 | +85 | 52 | Qualification to championship play-off |
| 2 | Delta Stars Tulcea (Q) | 18 | 13 | 2 | 3 | 53 | 21 | +32 | 41 | Qualification to championship play-off |
| 3 | Hamangia Baia | 18 | 12 | 1 | 5 | 42 | 28 | +14 | 37 | |
| 4 | Granitul Babadag | 18 | 11 | 2 | 5 | 82 | 32 | +50 | 35 | |
| 5 | Izbânda Mihail Kogălniceanu | 18 | 8 | 1 | 9 | 51 | 50 | +1 | 25 | |
| 6 | Luceafărul Slava Cercheză | 17 | 7 | 3 | 7 | 44 | 41 | +3 | 24 | |
| 7 | Egreta Sabangia | 17 | 6 | 1 | 10 | 39 | 48 | −9 | 19 | |
| 8 | Laguna Ceamurlia de Jos | 18 | 3 | 1 | 14 | 36 | 78 | −42 | 10 | |
| 9 | Heracleea Enisala | 18 | 3 | 0 | 15 | 26 | 83 | −57 | 9 | |
| 10 | Gloria Agighiol | 18 | 3 | 0 | 15 | 24 | 101 | −77 | 9 | |

Rules for classification: 1) Points; 2) Head-to-head points; 3) Head-to-head goal difference; 4) Head-to-head goals scored; 5) Head-to-head away goals scored; 6) Goal difference; 7) Goals scored.
(Q) Qualified for the phase indicated

Series B

| Pos | Team | Pld | W | D | L | GF | GA | GD | Pts | Qualification or relegation |
|---|---|---|---|---|---|---|---|---|---|---|
| 1 | Pescărușul Sarichioi (Q) | 18 | 17 | 1 | 0 | 160 | 20 | +140 | 52 | Qualification to championship play-off |
| 2 | Delta Aegyssus Tulcea (Q) | 18 | 15 | 1 | 2 | 101 | 21 | +80 | 46 | Qualification to championship play-off |
| 3 | Triumf Cerna | 18 | 11 | 1 | 6 | 58 | 51 | +7 | 34 | |
| 4 | Racheta Dăeni | 18 | 8 | 3 | 7 | 60 | 58 | +2 | 27 | |
| 5 | Național Somova | 18 | 9 | 0 | 9 | 44 | 62 | −18 | 27 | |
| 6 | Viitorul Frecăței | 16 | 7 | 0 | 9 | 48 | 46 | +2 | 21 | |
| 7 | Beroe Ostrov | 18 | 6 | 3 | 9 | 32 | 59 | −27 | 21 | |
| 8 | Triumful Turda | 18 | 5 | 4 | 9 | 37 | 86 | −49 | 19 | |
| 9 | Tractorul Horia | 16 | 1 | 2 | 13 | 22 | 79 | −57 | 5 | |
| 10 | Sarica Niculițel | 16 | 0 | 1 | 15 | 13 | 93 | −80 | 1 | |

Rules for classification: 1) Points; 2) Head-to-head points; 3) Head-to-head goal difference; 4) Head-to-head goals scored; 5) Head-to-head away goals scored; 6) Goal difference; 7) Goals scored.
(Q) Qualified for the phase indicated

Championship play-off
Semi-finals

The 1st leg matches were played on 21 May, and the 2nd leg on 28 May and 4 June 2017.

| Team 1 | Agg. | Team 2 | 1st leg | 2nd leg |
|---|---|---|---|---|
| Delta Stars Tulcea | 5–5 | Șoimii Topolog | 2–2 | 3–3 |
| Pescărușul Sarichioi | 4–0 | Delta Aegyssus Tulcea | 3–0 | 1–0 |

Final

The match was played on 11 June 2017 at Delta Stadium in Tulcea.

| Team 1 | Score | Team 2 |
|---|---|---|
| Pescărușul Sarichioi | 6–2 | Delta Stars Tulcea |

Pescărușul Sarichioi won the Liga IV Tulcea County and qualified for the promotion play-off in Liga III.

=== Vaslui County ===
The Liga IV Vaslui County was played over two stages. The regular season consisted of a double round-robin tournament featuring ten teams. At the end of this phase, the top four teams qualified for the championship play-off, while the bottom two teams were relegated to Liga V Vaslui.

Team changes from the previous season

- Victoria Muntenii de Jos (winners) and Avântul Zăpodeni (runners-up) declined promotion from Liga V Vaslui.
- SMART Negrești withdrew during the previous season.
- Viitorul Rebricea withdrew.
- Flacăra Murgeni was spared from relegation.
- Juventus Fălciu and Atletic Bârlad were admitted upon request.

| Pos | Team | Pld | W | D | L | GF | GA | GD | Pts | Qualification or relegation |
|---|---|---|---|---|---|---|---|---|---|---|
| 1 | Pajura Huși | 18 | 15 | 1 | 2 | 74 | 25 | +49 | 46 | Qualification to championship play-off |
| 2 | Gârceni | 18 | 14 | 0 | 4 | 67 | 26 | +41 | 42 | Qualification to championship play-off |
| 3 | Vitis Șuletea | 18 | 11 | 4 | 3 | 51 | 29 | +22 | 37 | Qualification to championship play-off |
| 4 | Vaslui | 18 | 10 | 4 | 4 | 56 | 34 | +22 | 34 | Qualification to championship play-off |
| 5 | Juventus Fălciu | 18 | 10 | 0 | 8 | 54 | 42 | +12 | 30 | |
| 6 | Atletic Bârlad | 18 | 9 | 2 | 7 | 57 | 26 | +31 | 29 | |
| 7 | Sporting Bârlad | 18 | 7 | 4 | 7 | 45 | 37 | +8 | 25 | |
| 8 | Multim Perieni | 18 | 3 | 0 | 15 | 19 | 83 | −64 | 9 | |
| 9 | Unirea Banca (R) | 18 | 2 | 1 | 15 | 28 | 106 | −78 | 7 | Relegation to Liga V Vaslui |
| 10 | Flacăra Murgeni (R) | 18 | 1 | 0 | 17 | 13 | 56 | −43 | 3 | Relegation to Liga V Vaslui |

Rules for classification: 1) Points; 2) Head-to-head points; 3) Head-to-head goal difference; 4) Head-to-head goals scored; 5) Head-to-head away goals scored; 6) Goal difference; 7) Goals scored.
(R) Relegated

Championship play-off

| Pos | Team | Pld | W | D | L | GF | GA | GD | Pts | Qualification |
|---|---|---|---|---|---|---|---|---|---|---|
| 1 | Gârceni (C, Q) | 6 | 4 | 2 | 0 | 18 | 8 | +10 | 14 | Qualification to promotion play-off |
| 2 | Vaslui | 6 | 3 | 1 | 2 | 13 | 9 | +4 | 10 | |
| 3 | Vitis Șuletea | 6 | 2 | 1 | 3 | 8 | 13 | −5 | 7 | |
| 4 | Pajura Huși | 6 | 1 | 0 | 5 | 9 | 18 | −9 | 3 | |

Rules for classification: 1) Points; 2) Head-to-head points; 3) Head-to-head goal difference; 4) Head-to-head goals scored; 5) Head-to-head away goals scored; 6) Goal difference; 7) Goals scored.
(C) Champions; (Q) Qualified for the phase indicated

=== Vâlcea County ===
Team changes from the previous season

- CS Șirineasa achieved promotion to Liga III.
- Viitorul Valea Mare (12th place), Minerul Ocnele Mari (14th place; excluded), Chimia 2012 Râmnicu Vâlcea (15th place) and AS Crețeni (16th place) were relegated to Liga V Vâlcea.
- Căpșunarii Bunești (South Series winners) and Luncavățul Popești (North Series winners) declined promotion from Liga V Vâlcea.
- Cavalerul Trac Cernișoara and AS Mihăești withdrew.
- Minerul Costești (13th place) was spared from relegation.
- FC Păușești Otăsău and Lotru Brezoi were admitted upon request.

| Pos | Team | Pld | W | D | L | GF | GA | GD | Pts | Qualification or relegation (Note: Teams are split into two groups (play-off and play-out) after each have played 20 matches.) |
|---|---|---|---|---|---|---|---|---|---|---|
| 1 | Viitorul Dăești (C, Q) | 30 | 26 | 1 | 3 | 115 | 26 | +89 | 79 | Qualification for promotion play-off |
| 2 | Posada Perișani | 30 | 21 | 5 | 4 | 109 | 35 | +74 | 68 | |
| 3 | Flacăra Horezu | 30 | 22 | 1 | 7 | 111 | 40 | +71 | 67 | |
| 4 | Vointa Orlești | 30 | 13 | 6 | 11 | 75 | 67 | +8 | 45 | |
| 5 | Cozia Călimănești | 30 | 9 | 9 | 12 | 64 | 63 | +1 | 36 | |
| 6 | Băbeni | 30 | 10 | 6 | 14 | 76 | 84 | −8 | 36 | |
| 7 | Unirea Tomșani | 28 | 13 | 5 | 10 | 96 | 97 | −1 | 44 | |
| 8 | Mădulari | 28 | 8 | 3 | 17 | 63 | 103 | −40 | 27 | |
| 9 | Lotru Brezoi (R) | 28 | 8 | 1 | 19 | 48 | 115 | −67 | 25 | Qualification to relegation play-off |
| 10 | Minerul Costești (R) | 28 | 4 | 3 | 21 | 49 | 109 | −60 | 15 | Qualification to relegation play-off |
| 11 | Păușești Otăsău (R) | 28 | 3 | 6 | 19 | 55 | 122 | −67 | 15 | Relegation to Liga V Vâlcea |

Rules for classification: 1) Points; 2) Head-to-head points; 3) Head-to-head goal difference; 4) Head-to-head goals scored; 5) Head-to-head away goals scored; 6) Goal difference; 7) Goals scored.
(C) Champions; (Q) Qualified for the phase indicated; (R) Relegated
Notes:

Relegation play-off

The 9th and 10th-placed teams of Liga IV Vâlcea faces the 2nd-placed teams in the two series of Liga V Vâlcea.

| Team 1 | Agg. | Team 2 | 1st leg | 2nd leg |
|---|---|---|---|---|
| Oltețul Bălcești | 4–2 | Lotru Brezoi | 1–0 | 3–2 |
| Minerul Costești | 5–6 | Stejarul Vlădești | 4–2 | 1–4 |

=== Vrancea County ===
Team changes from the previous season

- CSM Focșani and Național Golești were admitted upon request.
- Șoimii Internațional Mircești, Voința Răstoaca, Podgoria Cotești, Viitorul Biliești, Victoria Vânători, Unirea Milcovul, AS Suraia, Gloria Răcoasa, Viitorul Homocea, Trotusul Ruginești withdrew

| Pos | Team | Pld | W | D | L | GF | GA | GD | Pts | Qualification or relegation |
|---|---|---|---|---|---|---|---|---|---|---|
| 1 | Focșani (C, Q) | 22 | 21 | 1 | 0 | 151 | 11 | +140 | 64 | Qualification to promotion play-off |
| 2 | Victoria Gugești | 22 | 14 | 5 | 3 | 63 | 34 | +29 | 47 | |
| 3 | Național Golești | 22 | 14 | 5 | 3 | 54 | 27 | +27 | 47 | |
| 4 | Euromania Dumbrăveni | 22 | 13 | 3 | 6 | 62 | 30 | +32 | 42 | |
| 5 | Voința Cârligele | 22 | 10 | 3 | 9 | 59 | 50 | +9 | 33 | |
| 6 | Tractorul Nănești | 22 | 9 | 6 | 7 | 55 | 55 | 0 | 33 | |
| 7 | Unirea Țifești | 22 | 7 | 8 | 7 | 47 | 54 | −7 | 29 | |
| 8 | Adjud | 22 | 7 | 5 | 10 | 43 | 71 | −28 | 26 | |
| 9 | Dinamo Tătăranu | 22 | 6 | 1 | 15 | 35 | 98 | −63 | 19 | |
| 10 | Odobești | 21 | 4 | 3 | 14 | 39 | 66 | −27 | 15 (Note: Odobești and Voința Pufești withdrew in the second part of the season and lost all remaining matches with 0–3.) | |
| 11 | Voința Slobozia Ciorăști | 22 | 5 | 0 | 17 | 33 | 76 | −43 | 15 | |
| 12 | Voința Pufești | 21 | 1 | 0 | 20 | 7 | 76 | −69 | 3 | |

Rules for classification: 1) Points; 2) Head-to-head points; 3) Head-to-head goal difference; 4) Head-to-head goals scored; 5) Head-to-head away goals scored; 6) Goal difference; 7) Goals scored.
(C) Champions; (Q) Qualified for the phase indicated

== See also ==
- 2016–17 Liga I
- 2016–17 Liga II
- 2016–17 Liga III
- 2016–17 Cupa României
