= AFC Progresul Spartac București =

Romanian association football team

Progresul Spartac București
- Full name: Asociația Fotbal Club Progresul Spartac 1944 București
- Nicknames: Progresiștii (The Progressive People); Bleu-Albaștrii (The Bleu and Blues); Cavalerii frunzei de platan (The Knights of the Sycamore Leaf)
- Founded: 16 June 2014; 12 years ago
- Ground: Progresul Spartac
- Capacity: 1,030
- Owner: Gabriel Rădulescu
- Chairman: Radu Mandache
- Manager: Andrei Erimia
- League: Liga III
- 2025–26: Liga III, Seria V, 7th
- Website: https://progresulspartac.com/
Home colours	Away colours	Third colours

Asociația Fotbal Club Progresul Spartac 1944 București, commonly known as Progresul Spartac București or simply as Progresul Spartac, is a Romanian professional football club based in Bucharest, that competes in the Liga III.

The club was founded by a wing of the former club, Progresul București, but does not claim the record, logo or the succession of the old entity, despite the fact that it uses some elements of the original brand (bleu and blue colors; the sycamore leaf), called itself "direct descendant of Progresul București" and its objective is "to revive the spirit of Progresul from Cotroceni".

== History ==
Founded on 16 June 2014 by a wing of the former club, FC Progresul București, Progresul Spartac București is a club that does not claim the record, logo or the succession of the old entity, despite the fact that it uses some elements of the original brand (bleu and blue colors; the sycamore leaf), called itself "direct descendant of Progresul București" and its objective is "to revive the spirit of Progresul from Cotroceni".

In the 2016–17 season, at two years after foundation, the team won Liga IV – Bucharest series and qualified for the promotion play-off where it played against Voința Crevedia, Ilfov County champions. After the first leg, played in Bucharest, the Romanian Football Federation declared forfeit in favor of Voința Crevedia, because Progresul Spartac did not have a doctor at the match. One week later, in the second leg, played this time in Crevedia, Progresul Spartac overturned the situation, winning with 6–2 and gained promotion in the Liga III.

In the first season of Liga III, Progresiștii were the revelation of the second series where after a tough duel against Farul Constanța and even a 7–0 win against them, Progresul had to see itself defeated in the end and finished the season only on the 2nd place. Next season the bleu and blues were again a hard-to-beat team, winning against the big favourite of the series Rapid București and bringing to the stadium located in the "Sparrow's entry" a second division club, Universitatea Cluj, with the occasion of a round of 32 Romanian Cup match.

== Ground ==
With Progresul Spartac Stadium not being eligible for Liga II matches, the club announced in August 2022 that the team will play its home matches on CNAF Stadium in Buftea, a stadium with a capacity of 1,600 seats.

Alternatively, Progresul could also play on the Clinceni Stadium, arena that was the team's home in its first match of the season, while CNAF Stadium will host the home matches of Concordia Chiajna.

== Support ==
Starting with the 2016–17 season, Progresul Spartac is supported by FC Progresul's former fan groups. Progresul supporters consider FC Argeș Pitești supporters to be their allies, fans of both teams has the opportunity to support the other during matches.

== Honours ==
Liga III

- Winners (1): 2021–22
- Runners-up (1): 2017–18

Liga IV – Bucharest

- Winners (1): 2016–17

== Players ==
=== First team squad ===
As of 10 September 2024

Note: Flags indicate national team as defined under FIFA eligibility rules; some limited exceptions apply. Players may hold more than one non-FIFA nationality.

No.	Pos.	Nation	Player
1	GK	ROU	David Dumitrescu (on loan from CSA Steaua)
3	MF	ROU	Vlad Istrate
4	MF	ROU	Adrian Neacșu
6	MF	ROU	Andrei Grigore
8	MF	ROU	Răzvan Stîngă
11	MF	ROU	Luca Mitrică
12	GK	ROU	Mihai Ciontoș
13	MF	ROU	Alexandru Bărbuț
14	DF	ROU	Eduard Radu
16	DF	ROU	Vlad Calea
17	MF	ROU	Roberto Guță
18	MF	ROU	Nicolas Tong

No.	Pos.	Nation	Player
19	MF	ROU	Ionuț Costea
20	FW	ROU	Andrei Ohaci
21	MF	ROU	Vlad Papa (on loan from Sport Team)
22	DF	ROU	Darius Dumitrescu
23	FW	ROU	Rareș Mirea
24	DF	ROU	Florin Dinu
26	FW	ROU	David Micu
27	MF	ROU	Andrei Coșeru
28	FW	ROU	Patrick Cristian
31	GK	ROU	Matei Vlaicu
37	DF	ROU	Sebastian Radu
66	MF	ROU	Mario Iordan
77	DF	ROU	Deian Geană
99	DF	ROU	Răzvan Iacob

=== Out on loan ===
Note: Flags indicate national team as defined under FIFA eligibility rules; some limited exceptions apply. Players may hold more than one non-FIFA nationality.

No. / Pos. / Nation / Player	No. / Pos. / Nation / Player

== Club Officials ==
=== Board of directors ===
Role	Name
Owner	(Romania) Gabriel Rădulescu
President	(Romania) Radu Mandache
Sporting director	(Romania) Adrian Loghin
Head of Youth Center	(Romania) Mihai Mărăscu

=== Current technical staff ===
Role	Name
Head coach	(Romania) Andrei Erimia
Assistant coach	(Romania) Robert Oancea
Goalkeeping coach	(Romania) Mihai Albu
Fitness coach	(Romania) Cristian Matache
Performance analyst	(Romania) Alexandru Borisov
Club doctor	(Romania) Mircea Cojocaru

== League history ==
Season	Tier	Division	Place	Notes	Cupa României
2026–27	3	Liga III	TBD		TBD
2025–26	3	Liga III (Seria V)	7th	Play-out	Second round
2024–25	3	Liga III (Seria IV)	3rd		Second round
2023–24	2	Liga II	20th (R)	Relegated	Third round
2022–23	2	Liga II	16th	Spared from relegation	Third round
2021–22	3	Liga III (Seria IV)	1st (C, P)	Promoted	Third round
2020–21	3	Liga III (Seria IV)	3rd		Round of 32
2019–20	3	Liga III (Seria III)	1st (C)		Third round
2018–19	3	Liga III (Seria II)	3rd		Round of 32
2017–18	3	Liga III (Seria II)	2nd		–
2016–17	4	Liga IV (B)	1st (C, P)	Promoted	–
2015–16	5	Liga V (B)	9th		–
