= Stadionul Progresul Spartac =

Romanian football stadium

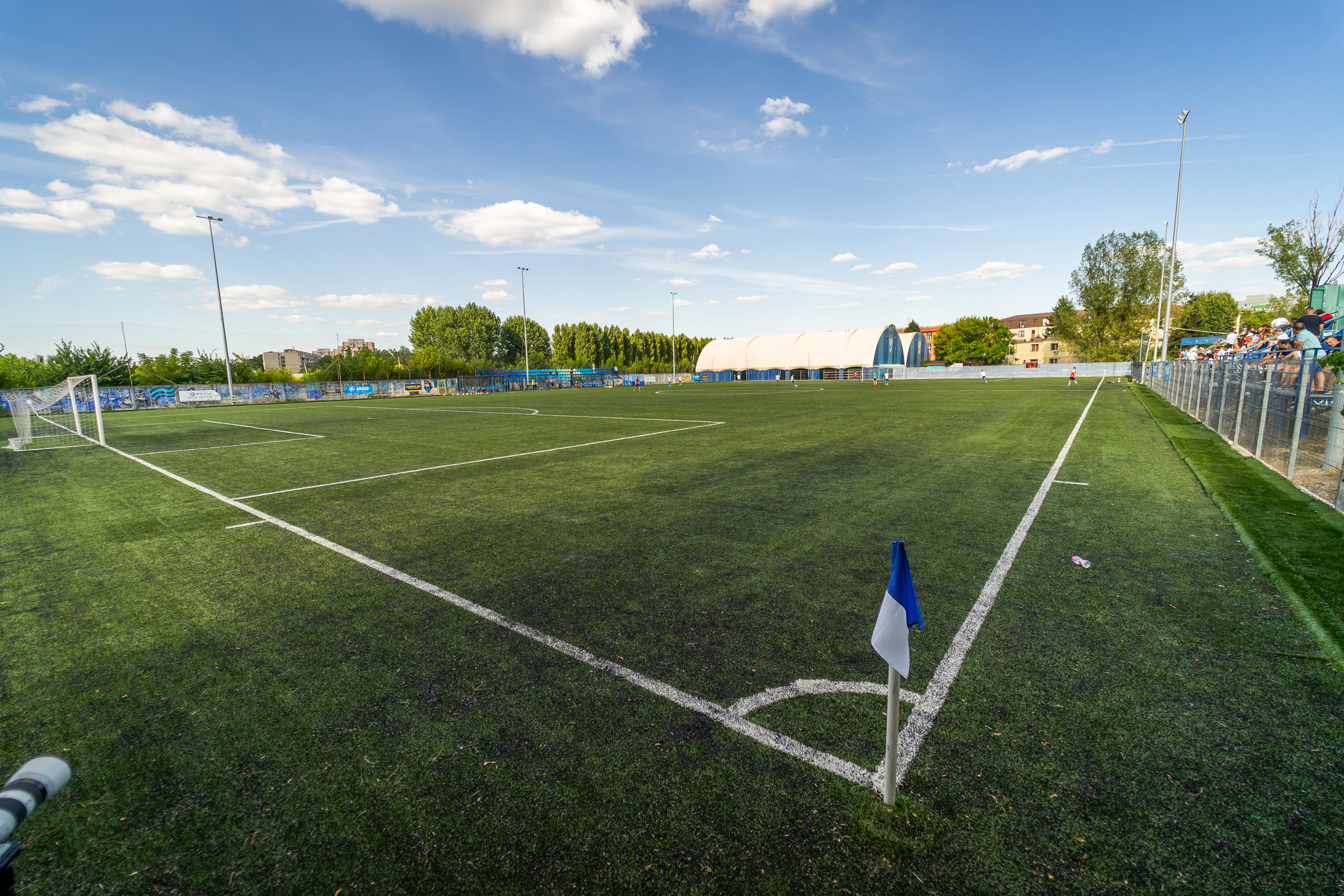
- Interactive map of Stadionul Progresul Spartac
- Former names: Stadionul Prefabricate
- Address: Str. Intrarea Vrabiei 30
- Location: Bucharest, Romania
- Coordinates: 44°22′50.1″N 26°05′16.2″E
- Owner: Progresul Spartac
- Operator: Progresul Spartac
- Capacity: 1,030 seated
- Surface: Artificial turf
- Field size: 102 x 64m

Construction
- Renovated: 2017–2019
- Expanded: 2017–2019

Tenant
- Progresul Spartac (2014–present)

Stadionul Progresul Spartac is a football-specific stadium in Bucharest, Romania. It is the home ground of Progresul Spartac București and has a capacity of 1,030 seats. The stadium was formerly known as Stadionul Prefabricate, but in 2014 it was bought by Progresul Spartac București and renamed. After the transaction, the newly formed club, which considers itself as a direct successor of FC Progresul București, began numerous modernization works, so the pitch (which was in a very bad condition) was changed with an artificial one, three stands were installed (Main Stand - 300 seats, Second Stand - 230 seats, East End - 500 seats), a flood-light installation with a capacity of 200 lux and two other indoor football grounds.
