= 1984–85 Divizia C =

Third tier Romanian football league

Divizia C
- Season: 1984–85

The 1984–85 Divizia C was the 29th season of Liga III, the third tier of the Romanian football league system.

The format was maintained with twelve series, each comprising 16 teams. At the end of the season, the winners of each series were promoted to Divizia B, while the bottom two teams from each series were relegated to the County Championship.

== Team changes ==
=== To Divizia C ===
Relegated from Divizia B

- Delta Tulcea
- Nitramonia Făgăraș
- CFR Victoria Caransebeș
- CSM Borzești
- ROVA Roșiori
- Steaua CFR Cluj-Napoca
- Unirea Slobozia
- Constructorul TCI Craiova
- Someșul Satu Mare
- Dunărea Călărași
- Chimia Turnu Măgurele
- Rapid Arad

Promoted from County Championship

- Viitorul Câmpulung Moldovenesc
- Luceafărul Botoșani
- Textila Buhuși
- Unirea Negrești
- Marina Mangalia
- Avântul Matca
- Constructorul TCIAZ Giurgiu
- ASA Buzău
- Agronomia Slobozia
- TMB București
- Avicola Crevedia
- Metalul Alexandria
- Victoria Craiova
- Forestierul Băbeni
- CSM Caransebeș
- Obilici Sânmartinu Sârbesc
- Recolta Salonta
- Constructorul Satu Mare
- Energia Prundu Bârgăului
- IS Sighetu Marmației
- Motorul IRA Cluj-Napoca
- Târnavele Blaj
- Cimentul Hoghiz
- Progresul Odorheiu Secuiesc

=== From Divizia C ===
Promoted to Divizia B

- CFR Pașcani
- FEPA 74 Bârlad
- Metalul Mangalia
- AS Mizil
- Mecanica Fină Steaua București
- Flacăra-Automecanica Moreni
- Drobeta-Turnu Severin
- Mureșul Deva
- Strungul Arad
- Sticla Arieșul Turda
- Unirea Alba Iulia
- Tractorul Brașov

Relegated to County Championship

- Cristalul Dorohoi
- Unirea Săveni
- Proletarul Bacău
- Energia Gheorghe Gheorghiu-Dej
- Victoria TC Galați
- Șoimii Cernavodă
- Tractorul Viziru
- Unirea Urziceni
- Constructorul Călărași
- FCM Giurgiu
- Petrolul Videle
- Cetatea Turnu Măgurele
- Lotru Brezoi
- Celuloza Drobeta-Turnu Severin
- Minerul Ghelar
- Minerul Aninoasa
- Bihoreana Marghita
- Rapid Jibou
- Construcții Electrometal Cluj-Napoca
- Unirea Dej
- Șurianu Sebeș
- Textila Năsăud
- Torpedo Zărnești
- Chimia Victoria

=== Renamed teams ===
Viitorul Câmpulung Moldovenesc was renamed Explorări Câmpulung Moldovenesc.

Celuloza Piatra Neamț merged with Bradul Roznov and was renamed Celuloza Bradul Roznov.

Luceafărul Botoșani was renamed Electro Luceafărul Botoșani.

Voința Gloria Odobești was renamed Constructorul Flacăra Odobești.

Victoria Gugești was renamed Foresta Gugești.

Laminorul Brăila was moved from Brăila to Viziru and was renamed Laminorul Viziru.

Chimia Buzău was renamed Chimia Victoria Buzău.

Agronomia Slobozia was renamed Olimpia Slobozia.

Argeșul 30 Decembrie was renamed Sportul 30 Decembrie.

TMB București was renamed Mecon București.

Metalul Mihăești was moved from Mihăești to Râmnicu Vâlcea and was renamed Metalul Râmnicu Vâlcea.

Energia Prundu Bârgăului was moved from Prundu Bârgăului to Beclean and was renamed Energia Progresul Beclean.

Foresta Bistrița merged with Textila Năsăud, the first one being absorbed by the second one and was renamed Chimforest Năsăud.

Motorul IRA Cluj-Napoca was renamed Viitorul IRA Cluj-Napoca.

=== Other changes ===
CSM Lugoj took the place of Constructorul Timișoara.

Luceafărul București was the team of the junior training center of the Romanian Football Federation and was enrolled directly in the third tier.

== League tables ==
=== Seria I ===
Pos	Team	Pld	W	D	L	GF	GA	GD	Pts	Promotion or relegation
1	Minerul Vatra Dornei (C, P)	30	20	4	6	51	20	+31	44	Promotion to Divizia B
2	Siretul Pașcani	30	18	6	6	65	27	+38	42	
3	Carpați Gălănești	30	15	4	11	44	37	+7	34	
4	Relonul Săvinești	30	13	7	10	48	24	+24	33	
5	Minerul Gura Humorului	30	13	6	11	38	32	+6	32	
6	Metalul Rădăuți	30	13	5	12	40	34	+6	31	
7	Explorări Câmpulung Moldovenesc	30	14	3	13	44	47	−3	31	
8	Cetatea Târgu Neamț	30	13	4	13	43	38	+5	30	
9	Avântul TCMM Frasin	30	13	3	14	38	47	−9	29	
10	Celuloza Bradul Roznov	30	11	6	13	36	32	+4	28	
11	Electro Siretul Bucecea	30	12	4	14	36	56	−20	28	
12	Constructorul Iași	30	12	3	15	46	48	−2	27	
13	Zimbrul Siret	30	11	5	14	32	48	−16	27	
14	Electro Luceafărul Botoșani	30	12	1	17	31	48	−17	25	
15	Tepro Iași (R)	30	9	3	18	32	56	−24	21	Relegation to County Championship
16	ASA Câmpulung Moldovenesc (R)	30	7	4	19	25	55	−30	18	Relegation to County Championship

Source: romaniansoccer.ro
Rules for classification: 1) points; 2) goal difference; 3) number of goals scored.
(C) Champions; (P) Promoted; (R) Relegated

=== Seria II ===
Pos	Team	Pld	W	D	L	GF	GA	GD	Pts	Promotion or relegation
1	Aripile Bacău (C, P)	30	19	4	7	74	25	+49	42	Promotion to Divizia B
2	Mecanica Vaslui	30	17	5	8	65	28	+37	39	
3	CSM Borzești	30	14	5	11	45	39	+6	33	
4	Textila Buhuși	30	15	2	13	59	48	+11	32	
5	Inter Vaslui	30	13	6	11	33	35	−2	32	
6	Laminorul Roman	30	15	1	14	53	46	+7	31	
7	Petrolul Moinești	30	14	1	15	51	33	+18	29	
8	Chimia Mărășești	30	12	5	13	38	49	−11	29	
9	Victoria Tecuci	30	10	8	12	41	39	+2	28	
10	Constructorul Flacăra Odobești	30	12	4	14	35	58	−23	28	
11	Foresta Gugești	30	9	9	12	29	38	−9	27	
12	Luceafărul Adjud	30	11	4	15	26	39	−13	26	
13	Unirea Negrești	30	10	6	14	51	67	−16	26	
14	Minerul Comănești	30	12	2	16	39	56	−17	26	
15	Letea Bacău (R)	30	11	4	15	38	56	−18	26	Relegation to County Championship
16	Viticultorul Panciu (R)	30	10	6	14	33	54	−21	26	Relegation to County Championship

Source: romaniansoccer.ro
Rules for classification: 1) points; 2) goal difference; 3) number of goals scored.
(C) Champions; (P) Promoted; (R) Relegated

=== Seria III ===
Pos	Team	Pld	W	D	L	GF	GA	GD	Pts	Promotion or relegation
1	Delta Tulcea (C, P)	30	18	7	5	57	15	+42	43	Promotion to Divizia B
2	IMU Medgidia	30	15	7	8	61	30	+31	37	
3	Chimia Brăila	30	14	7	9	49	33	+16	35	
4	Portul Constanța	30	14	6	10	50	28	+22	34	
5	Petrolul Ianca Brăila	30	14	4	12	38	43	−5	32	
6	DVA Portul Galați	30	13	4	13	44	41	+3	30	
7	Voința Constanța	30	13	3	14	49	48	+1	29	
8	Cimentul Medgidia	30	14	1	15	45	42	+3	29	
9	Șantierul Naval Tulcea	30	13	3	14	43	43	0	29	
10	Ancora Galați	30	13	3	14	29	47	−18	29	
11	Laminorul Viziru	30	13	2	15	47	44	+3	28	
12	Marina Mangalia	30	12	4	14	38	50	−12	28	
13	Progresul Isaccea	30	13	2	15	28	68	−40	28	
14	Arrubium Măcin	30	12	3	15	46	44	+2	27	
15	Avântul Matca (R)	30	11	4	15	47	63	−16	26	Relegation to County Championship
16	Chimpex Constanța (Note: ChImpex Constanța was excluded from the championship for failing to appear in three matches.) (R)	30	6	4	20	30	62	−32	16	Relegation to County Championship

Source: romaniansoccer.ro
Rules for classification: 1) points; 2) goal difference; 3) number of goals scored.
(C) Champions; (P) Promoted; (R) Relegated

=== Seria IV ===
Pos	Team	Pld	W	D	L	GF	GA	GD	Pts	Promotion or relegation
1	Dunărea Călărași (C, P)	30	15	11	4	59	28	+31	40 (Note: Dunărea Călărași were deducted 1 point.)	Promotion to Divizia B
2	Chimia Victoria Buzău	30	13	7	10	49	29	+20	33	
3	Petrolul Berca	30	13	6	11	36	40	−4	32	
4	Carpați Nehoiu	30	14	3	13	50	43	+7	31	
5	Constructorul TCIAZ Giurgiu	30	14	3	13	37	44	−7	31	
6	Metalul Buzău	30	11	8	11	45	34	+11	30	
7	ISCIP Ulmeni	30	11	8	11	40	36	+4	30	
8	ICPB Bolintin-Vale	30	12	6	12	38	35	+3	30	
9	Șantierul Naval Oltenița	30	12	6	12	33	30	+3	30	
10	ASA Buzău	30	13	3	14	39	49	−10	29	
11	Unirea Slobozia	30	12	4	14	42	43	−1	28	
12	Olimpia Slobozia	30	9	10	11	42	44	−2	28	
13	Victoria Țăndărei	30	13	2	15	40	50	−10	28	
14	Viitorul Chirnogi	30	10	8	12	37	47	−10	28	
15	Rapid Fetești (R)	30	12	4	14	30	41	−11	28	Relegation to County Championship
16	Victoria Lehliu (R)	30	10	3	17	35	59	−24	23	Relegation to County Championship

Source: romaniansoccer.ro
Rules for classification: 1) points; 2) goal difference; 3) number of goals scored.
(C) Champions; (P) Promoted; (R) Relegated

=== Seria V ===
Pos	Team	Pld	W	D	L	GF	GA	GD	Pts	Promotion or relegation
1	ICSIM București (C, P)	32	17	9	6	67	23	+44	43	Promotion to Divizia B
2	Sportul 30 Decembrie	32	17	8	7	45	27	+18	42	
3	IUPS Chitila	32	15	7	10	39	30	+9	37	
4	Danubiana București	32	15	6	11	44	36	+8	36	
5	Mecon București	32	12	10	10	39	28	+11	34	
6	Chimia Brazi	32	16	2	14	44	41	+3	34	
7	Avicola Crevedia	32	14	6	12	45	47	−2	34	
8	Poiana Câmpina	32	15	3	14	38	37	+1	33	
9	Petrolul Băicoi	32	16	1	15	32	40	−8	33	
10	Tehnometal București	32	14	4	14	46	43	+3	32	
11	Viscofil București	32	14	4	14	40	41	−1	32	
12	Minerul Filipeștii de Pădure	32	13	6	13	32	40	−8	32	
13	Carpați Sinaia	32	14	3	15	36	39	−3	31	
14	Abatorul București	32	10	10	12	42	37	+5	30	
15	Flacăra Roșie București	32	12	6	14	32	40	−8	30	
16	Aversa București (R)	32	7	4	21	31	60	−29	18	Relegation to County Championship
17	Luceafărul București (R)	32	4	5	23	29	72	−43	13	Relegation to County Championship

Source: romaniansoccer.ro
Rules for classification: 1) points; 2) goal difference; 3) number of goals scored.
(C) Champions; (P) Promoted; (R) Relegated

=== Seria VI ===
Pos	Team	Pld	W	D	L	GF	GA	GD	Pts	Promotion or relegation
1	Muscelul Câmpulung (C, P)	30	18	5	7	61	26	+35	41	Promotion to Divizia B
2	Electrica Titu	30	18	4	8	60	25	+35	40	
3	Progresul Corabia	30	13	5	12	52	33	+19	31	
4	Cimentul Fieni	30	14	3	13	36	37	−1	31	
5	Metalul Alexandria	30	14	2	14	32	35	−3	30	
6	Chimia Găești	30	13	4	13	46	57	−11	30	
7	Sportul Muncitoresc Caracal	30	13	3	14	37	43	−6	29	
8	Chimia Turnu Măgurele	30	11	7	12	26	33	−7	29	
9	ROVA Roșiori	30	13	3	14	30	39	−9	29	
10	Metalul Mija	30	14	1	15	31	41	−10	29	
11	Textila Roșiori	30	13	3	14	30	41	−11	29	
12	Dacia Pitești	30	12	4	14	40	34	+6	28	
13	Recolta Stoicănești	30	12	4	14	42	37	+5	28	
14	Electronistul Curtea de Argeș	30	12	4	14	42	44	−2	28	
15	Dunărea Venus Zimnicea (R)	30	13	1	16	37	47	−10	27	Relegation to County Championship
16	Știința Drăgănești-Olt (R)	30	9	3	18	29	59	−30	21	Relegation to County Championship

Source: romaniansoccer.ro
Rules for classification: 1) points; 2) goal difference; 3) number of goals scored.
(C) Champions; (P) Promoted; (R) Relegated

=== Seria VII ===
Pos	Team	Pld	W	D	L	GF	GA	GD	Pts	Promotion or relegation
1	Electroputere Craiova (C, P)	30	20	5	5	78	16	+62	45	Promotion to Divizia B
2	Viitorul Drăgășani	30	14	4	12	45	40	+5	32	
3	Pandurii Târgu Jiu	30	12	7	11	39	30	+9	31	
4	Constructorul TCI Craiova	30	12	7	11	48	41	+7	31	
5	Jiul Rovinari	30	13	5	12	36	31	+5	31	
6	Victoria Craiova	30	13	5	12	42	49	−7	31	
7	Progresul Băilești	30	12	6	12	43	46	−3	30	
8	Dierna Orșova	30	12	5	13	46	37	+9	29	
9	Metalurgistul Sadu	30	13	3	14	41	38	+3	29	
10	Armătura Strehaia	30	11	7	12	33	37	−4	29	
11	Mecanizatorul Șimian	30	13	3	14	39	47	−8	29	
12	Petrolul Țicleni	30	12	4	14	39	48	−9	28	
13	CFR Craiova	30	10	7	13	32	36	−4	27	
14	Forestierul Băbeni	30	11	5	14	33	61	−28	27	
15	Metalul Râmnicu Vâlcea (R)	30	10	6	14	30	53	−23	26	Relegation to County Championship
16	Dunărea Calafat (R)	30	10	5	15	35	49	−14	25	Relegation to County Championship

Source: romaniansoccer.ro
Rules for classification: 1) points; 2) goal difference; 3) number of goals scored.
(C) Champions; (P) Promoted; (R) Relegated

=== Seria VIII ===
Pos	Team	Pld	W	D	L	GF	GA	GD	Pts	Promotion or relegation
1	Metalul Bocșa (C, P)	30	17	4	9	55	34	+21	38	Promotion to Divizia B
2	CSM Caransebeș	30	14	5	11	53	31	+22	33	
3	Rapid Arad	30	14	5	11	56	38	+18	31 (Note: Rapid Arad were deducted 2 points.)	
4	CSM Lugoj	30	14	3	13	59	43	+16	31	
5	Unirea Sânnicolau Mare	30	13	5	12	41	41	0	31	
6	Unirea Tomnatic	30	14	3	13	45	56	−11	31	
7	Minerul Oravița	30	14	2	14	51	38	+13	30	
8	Minerul Anina	30	14	2	14	43	54	−11	30	
9	UM Timișoara	30	12	5	13	50	38	+12	29	
10	Metalul Oțelu Roșu	30	14	1	15	42	46	−4	29	
11	Obilici Sânmartinu Sârbesc	30	13	3	14	42	48	−6	29	
12	Minerul Moldova Nouă	30	13	2	15	43	42	+1	28	
13	Șoimii Lipova	30	11	6	13	38	48	−10	28	
14	CFR Victoria Caransebeș	30	11	6	13	34	51	−17	28	
15	Victoria Ineu (R)	30	11	4	15	34	56	−22	26	Relegation to County Championship
16	CFR Arad (R)	30	10	6	14	34	56	−22	26	Relegation to County Championship

Source: romaniansoccer.ro
Rules for classification: 1) points; 2) goal difference; 3) number of goals scored.
(C) Champions; (P) Promoted; (R) Relegated

=== Seria IX ===
Pos	Team	Pld	W	D	L	GF	GA	GD	Pts	Promotion or relegation
1	Înfrățirea Oradea (C, P)	30	17	8	5	43	16	+27	42	Promotion to Divizia B
2	Recolta Salonta	30	17	4	9	47	26	+21	38	
3	Unio Satu Mare	30	14	5	11	41	23	+18	33	
4	Victoria FIUT Carei	30	15	3	12	46	32	+14	33	
5	Someșul Satu Mare	30	12	8	10	44	39	+5	32	
6	Minerul Bihor	30	13	6	11	41	37	+4	32	
7	Minerul Sărmășag	30	13	6	11	40	41	−1	32	
8	Oțelul Bihor	30	11	8	11	47	36	+11	30	
9	Voința Oradea	30	12	5	13	36	34	+2	29	
10	Oașul Negrești-Oaș	30	12	4	14	34	39	−5	28	
11	Olimpia Gherla	30	12	4	14	31	41	−10	28	
12	Unirea Valea lui Mihai	30	11	6	13	28	43	−15	28	
13	Chimia Tășnad	30	13	2	15	40	57	−17	28	
14	Minerul Șuncuiuș	30	10	7	13	40	48	−8	27	
15	Silvania Cehu Silvaniei (R)	30	11	5	14	42	53	−11	27	Relegation to County Championship
16	Constructorul Satu Mare (R)	30	3	7	20	22	57	−35	13	Relegation to County Championship

Source: romaniansoccer.ro
Rules for classification: 1) points; 2) goal difference; 3) number of goals scored.
(C) Champions; (P) Promoted; (R) Relegated

=== Seria X ===
Pos	Team	Pld	W	D	L	GF	GA	GD	Pts	Promotion or relegation
1	CIL Sighetu Marmației (C, P)	30	19	4	7	61	22	+39	42	Promotion to Divizia B
2	Minerul Băița	30	13	7	10	41	34	+7	33	
3	Metalotehnica Târgu Mureș	30	14	4	12	46	31	+15	32	
4	Chimforest Năsăud	30	14	3	13	48	36	+12	31	
5	Minerul Baia Sprie	30	14	2	14	38	37	+1	30	
6	Minerul Rodna	30	14	2	14	39	43	−4	30	
7	Electromureș Târgu Mureș	30	13	3	14	41	29	+12	29	
8	Mureșul Luduș	30	13	3	14	44	40	+4	29	
9	Minerul Băiuț	30	14	1	15	36	38	−2	29	
10	Cuprom Baia Mare	30	14	1	15	35	45	−10	29	
11	Energia Progresul Beclean	30	12	5	13	35	57	−22	29	
12	Bradul Vișeu de Sus	30	13	2	15	35	41	−6	28	
13	Oțelul Reghin	30	13	2	15	35	44	−9	28	
14	Lăpușul Târgu Lăpuș	30	12	4	14	32	44	−12	28	
15	IS Sighetu Marmației (R)	30	11	6	13	34	51	−17	28	Relegation to County Championship
16	Minerul Baia Borșa (R)	30	9	7	14	43	51	−8	25	Relegation to County Championship

Source: romaniansoccer.ro
Rules for classification: 1) points; 2) goal difference; 3) number of goals scored.
(C) Champions; (P) Promoted; (R) Relegated

=== Seria XI ===
Pos	Team	Pld	W	D	L	GF	GA	GD	Pts	Promotion or relegation
1	Mecanica Orăștie (C, P)	30	18	5	7	50	20	+30	41	Promotion to Divizia B
2	Minerul Paroșeni	30	17	6	7	39	25	+14	40	
3	Viitorul IRA Cluj-Napoca	30	13	6	11	42	38	+4	32	
4	Metalul Aiud	30	11	9	10	39	29	+10	31	
5	Steaua CFR Cluj-Napoca	30	14	2	14	37	26	+11	30	
6	Minerul Știința Vulcan	30	12	5	13	52	36	+16	29	
7	Inter Sibiu	30	12	5	13	30	32	−2	29	
8	IMIX Agnita	30	14	1	15	37	42	−5	29	
9	Victoria Călan	30	12	5	13	40	47	−7	29	
10	Mecanica Alba Iulia	30	12	5	13	43	52	−9	29	
11	Dacia Orăștie	30	12	4	14	46	43	+3	28	
12	Unirea Ocna Sibiului	30	10	8	12	38	45	−7	28	
13	Minerul Certej	30	12	4	14	34	53	−19	28	
14	Metalul Sighișoara	30	11	5	14	32	41	−9	27	
15	Soda Ocna Mureș (R)	30	11	3	16	33	48	−15	25	Relegation to County Championship
16	Târnavele Blaj (R)	30	10	5	15	32	47	−15	25	Relegation to County Championship

Source: romaniansoccer.ro
Rules for classification: 1) points; 2) goal difference; 3) number of goals scored.
(C) Champions; (P) Promoted; (R) Relegated

=== Seria XII ===
Pos	Team	Pld	W	D	L	GF	GA	GD	Pts	Promotion or relegation
1	ICIM Brașov (C, P)	32	20	4	8	55	24	+31	42 (Note: ICIM Brașov were deducted 2 points.)	Promotion to Divizia B
2	Nitramonia Făgăraș	32	17	7	8	75	30	+45	41	
3	Metalul Târgu Secuiesc	32	17	5	10	61	37	+24	39	
4	Progresul Odorheiu Secuiesc	32	17	3	12	40	41	−1	37	
5	Minerul Baraolt	32	14	5	13	38	43	−5	33	
6	Cimentul Hoghiz	32	14	5	13	37	44	−7	33	
7	Metrom Brașov	32	13	5	14	57	50	+7	31	
8	Mureșul Toplița	32	14	2	16	44	46	−2	30	
9	Mobila Măgura Codlea	32	13	4	15	35	38	−3	30	
10	Electro Sfântu Gheorghe	32	13	4	15	40	43	−3	30	
11	Utilajul Făgăraș	32	13	4	15	36	47	−11	30	
12	Viitorul Gheorgheni	32	13	3	16	37	39	−2	29	
13	Precizia Săcele	32	12	5	15	42	48	−6	29	
14	Unirea Cristuru Secuiesc	32	13	3	16	35	57	−22	29	
15	Minerul Bălan	32	12	4	16	30	52	−22	28	
16	Celuloza Zărnești (R)	32	12	3	17	41	44	−3	27	Relegation to County Championship
17	Textila Prejmer (R)	32	10	4	18	26	46	−20	24	Relegation to County Championship

Source: romaniansoccer.ro
Rules for classification: 1) points; 2) goal difference; 3) number of goals scored.
(C) Champions; (P) Promoted; (R) Relegated

== See also ==
- 1984–85 Divizia A
- 1984–85 Divizia B
- 1984–85 County Championship
- 1984–85 Cupa României
