= 1984–85 County Championship =

43rd season of the Liga IV, the fourth tier of the Romanian football league

Liga IV
- Season: 1984–85

The 1984–85 County Championship was the 43rd season of the Liga IV, the fourth tier of the Romanian football league system. The champions of each county association play against one from a neighboring county in a play-off to gain promotion to Divizia C.

== County championships ==
- Alba (AB)
- Arad (AR)
- Argeș (AG)
- Bacău (BC)
- Bihor (BH)
- Bistrița-Năsăud (BN)
- Botoșani (BT)
- Brașov (BV)
- Brăila (BR)
- Bucharest (B)
- Buzău (BZ)
- Caraș-Severin (CS)
- Călărași (CL)
- Cluj (CJ)
- Constanța (CT)
- Covasna (CV)
- Dâmbovița (DB)
- Dolj (DJ)
- Galați (GL)
- Giurgiu (GR)
- Gorj (GJ)
- Harghita (HR)
- Hunedoara (HD)
- Ialomița (IL)
- Iași (IS)
- Ilfov (IF)
- Maramureș (MM)
- Mehedinți (MH)
- Mureș (MS)
- Neamț (NT)
- Olt (OT)
- Prahova (PH)
- Satu Mare (SM)
- Sălaj (SJ)
- Sibiu (SB)
- Suceava (SV)
- Teleorman (TR)
- Timiș (TM)
- Tulcea (TL)
- Vaslui (VS)
- Vâlcea (VL)
- Vrancea (VN)

== Promotion play-off ==
Teams promoted to Divizia C without a play-off matches as teams from less represented counties in the third division.

- (IL) Unirea Urziceni
- (SJ) Victoria Chimia Zalău
- (BT) Cristalul Dorohoi

Preliminary round

Team 1	Agg.	Team 2	1st leg	2nd leg
Voința București (B)	11–2	(IF) Unirea Tricolor Balotești	4–0	7–2

Play-off round

The matches was played on 7 and 14 July 1985.

Team 1	Agg.	Team 2	1st leg	2nd leg
Victoria Florești (PH)	5–2	(BR) Progresul Brăila	5–0	0–2
Cetatea Turnu Măgurele (TR)	2–4	(B) Voința București	1–2	1–2
CFR Simeria (HD)	6–2	(AB) Cuprom Abrud	4–2	2–0
Jiul IEELIF Craiova (DJ)	0–0 (3–4 p)	(VL) Chimistul Râmnicu Vâlcea	0–0	0–0
CSU Mecanica Sibiu (SB)	4–2	(AG) Gloria Berevoești	3–1	1–1
Stăruința Berveni (SM)	3–7	(CJ) Electrometal Cluj-Napoca	2–2	1–5
Strungul Chișineu-Criș (AR)	3–2	(TM) Auto Timișoara	1–0	2–2
Danubiana Roman (NT)	5–4	(SV) Filatura Fălticeni	5–1	0–3
Lacul Ursu Sovata (MS)	2–2 (4–3 p)	(BN) Laminorul Beclean	2–0	0–2
Petrolistul Râmnicu Sărat (BZ)	4–2	(VN) Laminorul Focșani	3–2	1–0
Unirea Mânăstirea (CL)	2–5	(TL) Granitul Babadag	2–0	0–5
Gloria Ivești (GL)	1–6	(VS) Metalul Huși	0–2	1–4
Gloria Beiuș (BH)	4–1	(MM) Recolta Rozavlea	3–0	1–1
Fortus Iași (IS)	1–2	(BC) Proletarul Bacău	1–0	0–2
IPT Întorsura Buzăului (CV)	2–2 (Note: IPT Întorsura Buzăului won on the away goals rule.)	(HR) Tractorul Miercurea Ciuc	1–0	1–2
Torpedo Zărnești (BV)	3–2	(DB) Petrolul Târgoviște	3–1	0–1
Petrolul Roata de Jos (GR)	2–6	(CT) Electrica Constanța	2–2	0–4
Metalul Scornicești (OT)	3–1	(MH) Victoria Vânju Mare	2–1	1–0
Automecanica Reșița (CS)	1–2	(GJ) Minerul Mătăsari	1–0	0–2

== Championships standings ==
=== Arad County ===
Series A

Pos	Team	Pld	W	D	L	GF	GA	GD	Pts	Qualification or relegation
1	Motorul Arad (Q)	34	30	2	2	108	11	+97	62	Qualification to championship final
2	Progresul Pecica	34	28	6	0	111	26	+85	62	
3	Tricoul Roșu Arad	34	18	2	14	58	39	+19	38	
4	Mureșul Zădăreni	34	17	3	14	77	60	+17	37	
5	Victoria Felnac	34	14	6	14	55	44	+11	34	
6	Stăruința Dorobanți	34	14	5	15	52	45	+7	33	
7	Victoria Zăbrani	34	13	7	14	54	54	0	33	
8	Victoria Nădlac	34	13	6	15	61	57	+4	32	
9	Frontiera Curtici	34	14	3	17	53	60	−7	31	
10	Victoria Ceasuri Arad	34	12	7	15	46	53	−7	31	
11	Voința Macea	34	13	5	16	44	71	−27	31	
12	Foresta Sânpetru German	34	13	4	17	46	47	−1	30	
13	Viitorul Turnu	34	14	2	18	54	90	−36	30	
14	Unirea Șofronea	34	11	7	16	57	84	−27	29	
15	CPL Arad	34	12	4	18	50	58	−8	28	
16	Înfrățirea Iratoșu	34	9	9	16	39	57	−18	27	
17	Semlecana Semlac	34	10	5	19	32	64	−32	25	
18	Înainte Sânmartin	34	7	5	22	32	109	−77	19	

Rules for classification: 1) Points; 2) Goal difference; 3) Number of goals scored.
(Q) Qualified for the phase indicated

Series B

Pos	Team	Pld	W	D	L	GF	GA	GD	Pts	Qualification or relegation
1	Strungul Chișineu-Criș (Q)	33	26	4	3	92	17	+75	56	Qualification to championship final
2	Șoimii Pâncota	33	19	5	9	70	38	+32	43	
3	Gloria Arad	33	19	4	10	67	37	+30	42	
4	Olimpia Pădureni	33	18	2	13	61	41	+20	38	
5	Olimpia ISD Arad	33	16	3	14	71	51	+20	35	
6	Gloria Ineu	33	15	5	13	40	37	+3	35	
7	Unirea Sântana	33	15	2	16	55	59	−4	32	
8	Confecția Hălmagiu	33	15	2	16	52	61	−9	32	
9	Victoria Seleuș	33	13	5	15	45	41	+4	31	
10	Chimia Arad	33	13	5	15	62	61	+1	31	
11	Fulgerul Arad	33	13	4	16	49	51	−2	30	
12	Dacia Beliu	33	14	2	17	45	62	−17	30	
13	Crișana Sebiș	33	12	6	15	53	78	−25	30	
14	Unirea Ineu	33	11	7	15	46	48	−2	29	
15	Șiriana Șiria	33	12	5	16	51	54	−3	29	
16	CFR Gurahonț	33	12	5	16	36	90	−54	29	
17	Cermei	33	13	2	18	47	64	−17	28	
18	Agrișu Mic	33	5	4	24	34	86	−52	14	

Rules for classification: 1) Points; 2) Goal difference; 3) Number of goals scored.
(Q) Qualified for the phase indicated

Championship final

The matches was played on 11 and 15 June 1985.

Team 1	Agg.	Team 2	1st leg	2nd leg
Motorul Arad	1–2	Strungul Chișineu-Criș	1–0	0–2

Strungul Chișineu-Criș won the Arad County Championship and qualify for promotion play-off in Divizia C.

=== Botoșani County ===
Pos	Team	Pld	W	D	L	GF	GA	GD	Pts	Qualification or relegation
1	Cristalul Dorohoi (C, Q)	26	25	0	1	146	16	+130	50	Qualification to promotion play-off
2	Metalul Botoșani	26	22	1	3	126	18	+108	45	
3	Avântul Abator Răchiți	26	14	3	9	54	45	+9	31	
4	Ceramica Mașini Unelte Dorohoi	26	11	4	11	51	61	−10	25 (Note: Ceramica Mașini Unelte Dorohoi deducted 1 point.)	
5	Voința Șendriceni	26	11	3	12	42	68	−26	25	
6	Sănătatea Darabani	26	11	4	11	55	42	+13	24 (Note: Sănătatea Darabani, Sportivul Trușești, Zorile Roma, Confecția Săveni, Textila Botoșani and Electro Botoșani deducted 2 points.)	
7	Sportivul Trușești	26	10	3	13	88	65	+23	21	
8	Zorile Roma	26	11	1	14	48	62	−14	21	
9	Confecția Săveni	26	9	4	13	39	63	−24	20	
10	Textila Botoșani	26	8	5	13	36	68	−32	19	
11	Viitorul Dersca	26	9	1	16	48	83	−35	19	
12	Electro Botoșani	26	9	1	16	41	75	−34	17	
13	Unirea Săveni	26	8	5	13	37	86	−49	16 (Note: Unirea Săveni deducted 5 points.)	
14	Avântul Albești	26	5	3	18	32	71	−39	10 (Note: Avântul Albești deducted 3 points.)	

Rules for classification: 1) Points; 2) Goal difference; 3) Number of goals scored.
(C) Champions; (Q) Qualified for the phase indicated

=== Bucharest ===
Pos	Team	Pld	W	D	L	GF	GA	GD	Pts	Qualification or relegation
1	Voința București (C, Q)	30	17	9	4	42	18	+24	43	Qualification to promotion play-off
2	IMGB București	30	17	8	5	49	25	+24	42	
3	Automecanica București	30	13	9	8	38	21	+17	35	
4	URBIS București	30	14	6	10	37	32	+5	34	
5	CFR BTA București	30	14	4	12	50	43	+7	32	
6	ICME București	30	9	12	9	32	26	+6	30	
7	Mașini Unelte București	30	11	7	12	36	42	−6	29	
8	Electra București	30	11	7	12	27	33	−6	29	
9	Granitul București	30	11	7	12	30	42	−12	29	
10	Mecos București	30	11	6	13	36	37	−1	28	
11	Calculatorul București	30	11	6	13	36	39	−3	28	
12	Gloria București	30	9	10	11	28	33	−5	28	
13	Icar București	30	10	6	14	28	35	−7	26	
14	Laromet București	30	10	6	14	38	46	−8	26	
15	Electroaparataj București	30	8	7	15	23	30	−7	23	
16	Electromagnetica București (R)	30	6	6	18	28	56	−28	18	Relegation to Bucharest Championship II

Rules for classification: 1) Points; 2) Goal difference; 3) Number of goals scored.
(C) Champions; (Q) Qualified for the phase indicated; (R) Relegated

=== Caraș-Severin County ===
Pos	Team	Pld	W	D	L	GF	GA	GD	Pts	Qualification or relegation
1	Automecanica Reșița (C, Q)	30	23	4	3	81	17	+64	50	Qualification to promotion play-off
2	Metalul Reșița	30	20	4	6	87	32	+55	44	
3	Hercules Băile Herculane	30	18	7	5	76	29	+47	43	
4	Autoforesta Bocșa	30	20	2	8	68	37	+31	42	
5	Foresta Zăvoi	30	18	1	11	65	35	+30	37	
6	Metalul Topleț	30	17	1	12	80	37	+43	33 (Note: Metalul Topleț deducted 2 points.)	
7	Minerul Ocna de Fier	30	15	2	13	57	54	+3	32	
8	Muncitorul Știința Reșița	30	12	5	13	54	56	−2	29	
9	Minerul Sasca Montană	29	10	4	15	45	58	−13	24	
10	Nera Bozovici	30	9	5	16	43	62	−19	23	
11	Minerul Mehadia	30	10	3	17	36	66	−30	23	
12	Minerul Rușchița	30	11	1	18	38	105	−67	23	
13	Bistra Glimboca	30	8	6	16	48	64	−16	22	
14	Turist Reșița	30	7	7	16	48	78	−30	21	
15	Șoimii Sichevița	29	6	4	19	36	70	−34	16	
16	Unirea Reșița	30	4	5	21	22	82	−60	13	

Rules for classification: 1) Points; 2) Goal difference; 3) Number of goals scored.
(C) Champions; (Q) Qualified for the phase indicated

=== Harghita County ===
Pos	Team	Pld	W	D	L	GF	GA	GD	Pts	Qualification or relegation
1	Tractorul Miercurea Ciuc (C, Q)	26	23	1	2	83	19	+64	47	Qualification to promotion play-off
2	Harghita Miercurea Ciuc	26	15	5	6	55	25	+30	35	
3	Constructorul Miercurea Ciuc	26	13	5	8	71	61	+10	31	
4	Metalul Vlăhița	26	12	6	8	58	35	+23	30	
5	Avicola Cristuru Secuiesc	26	12	6	8	41	25	+16	30	
6	Mobila Ditrău	26	10	8	8	47	32	+15	28	
7	Harghita Odorheiu Secuiesc	26	10	6	10	47	43	+4	26	
8	Complexul Gălăuțaș	26	10	5	11	45	35	+10	25	
9	IPEG Tomești	26	9	6	11	33	47	−14	24	
10	Unirea Hodoșa	26	9	5	12	38	55	−17	23	
11	Viață Nouă Remetea	26	8	3	15	47	59	−12	19	
12	Făgetul Borsec	26	7	5	14	46	82	−36	19	
13	Șoimii Băile Tușnad (Note: Șoimii Băile Tușnad was spared from relegation due to the expansion of the championship to 15 teams.)	26	8	1	17	40	83	−43	17	Spared from relegation
14	ITA Cârța (R)	26	4	3	19	30	80	−50	11	Relegation to Harghita County Championship II

Rules for classification: 1) Points; 2) Goal difference; 3) Number of goals scored.
(C) Champions; (Q) Qualified for the phase indicated; (R) Relegated

=== Hunedoara County ===
Pos	Team	Pld	W	D	L	GF	GA	GD	Pts	Qualification or relegation
1	CFR Simeria (C, Q)	30	23	5	2	101	23	+78	51	Qualification to promotion play-off
2	Minerul Aninoasa	30	21	5	4	73	16	+57	47	
3	Minerul Ghelari	30	20	0	10	70	27	+43	40	
4	Constructorul Hunedoara	30	15	4	11	55	33	+22	34	
5	Avântul Hațeg	30	15	4	11	50	44	+6	34	
6	Parângul Lonea	30	13	7	10	63	45	+18	33	
7	Preparatorul Petrila	30	16	1	13	55	44	+11	33	
8	Minerul Uricani	30	13	6	11	41	46	−5	32	
9	Voința CLF Ilia	30	12	3	15	42	58	−16	27	
10	Streiul Simeria Veche	30	9	8	13	39	61	−22	26	
11	Minerul Teliuc	30	11	3	16	46	52	−6	25	
12	Metalul Crișcior	30	10	5	15	40	50	−10	25	
13	CFR Petroșani	30	7	7	16	40	78	−38	21	
14	Măgura Minerul Pui	30	7	7	16	37	83	−46	21	
15	Minerul Bărbăteni	30	7	5	18	33	85	−52	19	
16	Dacia Hunedoara	30	4	4	22	25	65	−40	12	

Rules for classification: 1) Points; 2) Goal difference; 3) Number of goals scored.
(C) Champions; (Q) Qualified for the phase indicated

=== Maramureș County ===
North Series

Pos	Team	Pld	W	D	L	GF	GA	GD	Pts	Qualification or relegation
1	Recolta Rozavlea (Q)	22	14	5	3	70	19	+51	33	Qualification to championship final
2	Zorile Moisei	22	12	3	7	72	39	+33	27	
3	Recolta Remeți	22	12	1	9	57	50	+7	25	
4	Maramureșana Sighetu Marmației	22	9	6	7	52	34	+18	24	
5	Bradul Vișeu de Sus II	22	11	2	9	47	50	−3	24	
6	IPP Coștiui	22	11	0	11	60	72	−12	22	
7	Iza Dragomirești	22	8	5	9	34	39	−5	21	
8	Forestiera Câmpulung la Tisa	22	8	3	11	42	40	+2	19	
9	Metalul Bogdan Vodă	22	9	1	12	40	60	−20	19	
10	Avântul Bârsana	22	7	3	12	27	56	−29	17	
11	AEI Sighetu Marmației	22	7	3	12	38	46	−8	16 (Note: AEI Sighetu Marmației and Voința Sighetu Marmației were deducted 1 point.)	
12	Voința Sighetu Marmației	22	5	4	13	35	69	−34	13	

(Q) Qualified for the phase indicated
Notes:

South Series

Pos	Team	Pld	W	D	L	GF	GA	GD	Pts	Qualification or relegation
1	Electrica Baia Mare (Q)	22	17	3	2	71	18	+53	37	Qualification to championship final
2	Stăruința Recea	22	16	3	3	76	21	+55	35	
3	Unirea Seini	22	13	3	6	68	21	+47	29	
4	Tractorul Satulung	22	12	3	7	65	29	+36	27	
5	Sticla Ulmeni	22	10	3	9	54	50	+4	23	
6	Prefabricate Mireșu Mare	22	10	1	11	49	40	+9	21	
7	Sportul Muncitoresc Cavnic	22	9	3	10	43	46	−3	21	
8	Someșul Cicârlău	22	8	2	12	32	44	−12	18	
9	Spicul Mocira	22	7	3	12	34	68	−34	17	
10	Progresul Șomcuta Mare	22	6	4	12	28	52	−24	16	
11	Spicul Ardusat	22	4	3	15	24	88	−64	11	
12	Olimpia Baia Mare	22	3	2	17	23	90	−67	8	

(Q) Qualified for the phase indicated

Championship final

The championship final was played on 13 June 1985 at CIL Stadium in Sighetu Marmației.

Team 1	Score	Team 2
Recolta Rozavlea	1–0	Electrica Baia Mare

Recolta Rozavlea won the Liga IV Maramureș County and qualify to promotion play-off in Divizia C.

=== Mureș County ===
Pos	Team	Pld	W	D	L	GF	GA	GD	Pts	Qualification or relegation
1	Lacul Ursu Sovata (C, Q)	26	18	3	5	56	22	+34	39	Qualification to promotion play-off
2	Metalul Reghin	26	16	4	6	50	19	+31	36	
3	IRA Târgu Mureș	26	16	3	7	42	27	+15	35	
4	ILEFOR Târgu Mureș	26	12	3	11	37	35	+2	27	
5	Faianța Sighișoara	26	11	4	11	30	33	−3	26	
6	Voința Sângeorgiu de Pădure	26	12	2	12	34	42	−8	26	
7	Valea Mureșului Gornești	26	10	5	11	32	33	−1	25	
8	Autobuzul Târnăveni	26	11	3	12	49	55	−6	25	
9	Sticla Târnăveni	26	10	3	13	48	38	+10	23	
10	Viitorul Prodcomplex Târgu Mureș	26	9	5	12	31	28	+3	23	
11	Energia Iernut	26	8	7	11	31	34	−3	23	
12	Constructorul Târgu Mureș	26	8	6	12	29	31	−2	22	
13	Voința Miercurea Nirajului (Note: Voința Miercurea Nirajului was spared from relegation due to the promotion of Lacul Ursu Sovata in Divizia C.)	26	7	8	11	30	39	−9	22	Spared from relegation
14	Recolta Vidrasău (R)	26	4	4	18	24	87	−63	12	Relegation to Mureș County Championship II

Rules for classification: 1) Points; 2) Goal difference; 3) Number of goals scored.
(C) Champions; (Q) Qualified for the phase indicated; (R) Relegated

=== Neamț County ===
Pos	Team	Pld	W	D	L	GF	GA	GD	Pts	Qualification or relegation
1	Danubiana Roman (C, Q)	26	20	2	4	93	26	+67	42	Qualification to promotion play-off
2	Cimentul Bicaz	26	18	3	5	69	24	+45	39	
3	Metalul IM Roman	26	16	3	7	48	30	+18	35	
4	Voința Târgu Neamț	26	13	2	11	44	53	−9	28	
5	Șoimii Piatra Șoimului	26	9	8	9	49	38	+11	26	
6	Vulturul Zănești	26	10	6	10	42	42	0	26	
7	Energia Săbăoani	26	10	3	13	42	46	−4	23	
8	ITA Piatra Neamț	26	8	7	11	43	47	−4	23	
9	IM Piatra Neamț	26	8	7	11	40	54	−14	23	
10	Unirea Trifești	26	10	3	13	31	61	−30	23	
11	CPL Piatra Neamț	26	9	4	13	46	54	−8	22	
12	Viitorul Podoleni	26	10	1	15	38	63	−25	21	
13	Biruința Negrești (Note: Biruința Negrești was spared from relegation due to the promotion of Danubiana Roman in Divizia C.)	26	10	1	15	41	61	−20	19 (Note: Biruința Negrești deducted 2 points.)	Spared from relegation
14	Recolta Horia (R)	26	5	2	19	31	58	−27	12	Relegation to Neamț County Championship II

Rules for classification: 1) Points; 2) Goal difference; 3) Number of goals scored.
(C) Champions; (Q) Qualified for the phase indicated; (R) Relegated

=== Prahova County ===
Pos	Team	Pld	W	D	L	GF	GA	GD	Pts	Qualification or relegation
1	Victoria Florești (C, Q)	34	23	7	4	74	26	+48	53	Qualification to promotion play-off
2	Geamul Scăieni	34	20	10	4	79	22	+57	50	
3	Caraimanul Bușteni	34	19	4	11	64	31	+33	42	
4	Neptun Câmpina	34	18	4	12	46	28	+18	40	
5	Chimistul Valea Călugărească	34	16	6	12	53	34	+19	38	
6	Unirea Teleajen Ploiești	34	15	6	13	38	36	+2	36	
7	Petrolistul Boldești	34	16	3	15	41	32	+9	35	
8	Sportul Muncitoresc Câmpina	34	13	9	12	38	39	−1	35	
9	Oțelul Câmpina	34	13	8	13	40	38	+2	34	
10	Avântul Măneciu	34	12	9	13	56	37	+19	33	
11	Metalul Filipeștii de Pădure	34	13	7	14	40	45	−5	33	
12	Carotajul Ploiești	34	12	8	14	37	62	−25	32	
13	IUC Ploiești	34	13	5	16	42	43	−1	31	
14	Precizia Breaza	34	12	7	15	38	49	−11	31	
15	Feroemail Ploiești	34	13	4	17	38	50	−12	30	
16	Știința CSU Ploiești	34	9	6	19	45	59	−14	24	
17	Voința Vărbilău	34	6	6	22	36	105	−69	18	
18	Spartac Filipeștii de Târg (R)	34	1	5	28	20	103	−83	7	Relegation to Prahova County Championship II

Rules for classification: 1) Points; 2) Goal difference; 3) Number of goals scored.
(C) Champions; (Q) Qualified for the phase indicated; (R) Relegated

=== Sălaj County ===
Series I

Pos	Team	Pld	W	D	L	GF	GA	GD	Pts	Qualification or relegation
1	Victoria Chimia Zalău (Q)	30	25	1	4	108	21	+87	51	Qualification to championship final
2	Rapid Jibou	30	23	4	3	138	24	+114	50	
3	Integrata-Confecția Jibou	30	19	5	6	78	35	+43	43	
4	Energia Sânmihaiu Almașului	30	17	4	9	65	38	+27	38	
5	Minerul Surduc	30	15	2	13	94	52	+42	32	
6	Unirea Hida	30	14	4	12	69	59	+10	32	
7	Progresul Bălan	30	13	6	11	74	65	+9	32	
8	Speranța Sânpetru Almașului	30	14	1	15	54	55	−1	29	
9	Victoria Românași	30	10	4	16	59	76	−17	24	
10	Calmin Băbeni	30	11	2	17	55	86	−31	24	
11	Recolta Agrij	30	11	2	17	50	100	−50	24	
12	Topitorul Someș-Odorhei	30	10	3	17	42	83	−41	23	
13	Luceafărul Năpradea	30	9	4	17	46	92	−46	22	
14	Flacăra Rona	30	9	3	18	41	85	−44	21	
15	Voința Motiș	30	9	1	20	39	85	−46	19	
16	Minerul Letca	30	6	4	20	34	90	−56	16	

(Q) Qualified for the phase indicated

Series II

Pos	Team	Pld	W	D	L	GF	GA	GD	Pts	Qualification or relegation
1	Recolta Sărmășag (Q)	30	23	4	3	97	24	+73	50	Qualification to championship final
2	Gloria Armătura Șimleu Silvaniei	30	22	1	7	94	30	+64	45	
3	Gloria Bobota	30	18	5	7	92	34	+58	41	
4	Recolta Crișeni	30	18	3	9	73	42	+31	39	
5	Recolta Zăuan	30	16	5	9	61	42	+19	37	
6	Minerul Ip	30	15	4	11	56	42	+14	34	
7	Voința Derșida	30	13	3	14	49	52	−3	29	
8	Recolta Sălățig	30	13	3	14	63	72	−9	29	
9	Olimpic Bocșa	30	13	2	15	60	72	−12	28	
10	Spartac Crasna	30	11	3	16	46	51	−5	25	
11	Voința Aghireș	30	11	2	17	47	86	−39	24	
12	Avântul Lompirt	30	11	2	17	43	83	−40	24	
13	Cetatea Valcău de Jos	30	11	1	18	51	93	−42	23	
14	Minerul Sighetu Silvaniei	30	10	1	19	56	68	−12	21	
15	Unirea Hereclean	30	6	4	20	31	75	−44	16	
16	9 Mai Zalnoc	30	7	1	22	39	92	−53	15	

(Q) Qualified for the phase indicated

Championship final

The match was played on 16 June 1985 at 23 August Stadium in Zalău.

Team 1	Score	Team 2
Victoria Chimia Zalău	3–0	Recolta Sărmășag

Victoria Chimia Zalău won the Sălaj County Championship and qualify to promotion play-off in Divizia C.

=== Sibiu County ===
Pos	Team	Pld	W	D	L	GF	GA	GD	Pts	Qualification or relegation
1	CSU Mecanica Sibiu (C, Q)	30	23	6	1	68	16	+52	52	Qualification to promotion play-off
2	Carbomet Copșa Mică	30	23	5	2	65	14	+51	51	
3	Textila Cisnădie	30	18	5	7	69	34	+35	41	
4	Vitrometan Mediaș	30	15	6	9	38	28	+10	36	
5	Progresul Dumbrăveni	30	14	5	11	59	32	+27	33	
6	Construcții Sibiu	30	15	3	12	40	42	−2	33	
7	Relee Mediaș	30	12	6	12	41	43	−2	30	
8	Firul Roșu Tălmaciu	30	10	8	12	37	45	−8	28	
9	Automecanica Mediaș	30	10	7	13	42	39	+3	27	
10	Record Mediaș	30	9	9	12	43	56	−13	27	
11	Metalul IO Sibiu	30	8	9	13	49	51	−2	25	
12	Sparta Mediaș	30	11	3	16	49	54	−5	25	
13	CFR Sibiu	30	9	4	17	51	72	−21	22	
14	ITA-Geamuri Mediaș	30	7	7	16	32	43	−11	21	
15	Voința-Balanța Sibiu	30	5	6	19	19	55	−36	16	
16	Cibinul Cristian	30	3	5	22	25	109	−84	11	

Rules for classification: 1) Points; 2) Goal difference; 3) Number of goals scored.
(C) Champions; (Q) Qualified for the phase indicated

== See also ==
- 1984–85 Divizia A
- 1984–85 Divizia B
- 1984–85 Divizia C
- 1984–85 Cupa României
