= 1985–86 Divizia C =

Third tier Romanian football league

Divizia C
- Season: 1985–86

The 1985–86 Divizia C was the 30th season of Liga III, the third tier of the Romanian football league system.

== Team changes ==
=== To Divizia C ===
Relegated from Divizia B

- FEPA 74 Bârlad
- Metalul București
- Metalurgistul Cugir
- Metalul Mangalia
- Unirea Alexandria
- Sticla Arieșul Turda
- Partizanul Bacău
- Autobuzul București
- Gloria Reșița
- Unirea Dinamo Focșani
- Minerul Motru
- Industria Sârmei Câmpia Turzii

Promoted from County Championship

- Danubiana Roman
- Cristalul Dorohoi
- Petrolistul Râmnicu Sărat
- Proletarul Bacău
- Metalul Huși
- Granitul Babadag
- Unirea Urziceni
- Electrica Constanța
- Voința București
- Metalul Scornicești
- Minerul Mătăsari
- Chimistul Râmnicu Vâlcea
- Strungul Chișineu-Criș
- CFR Simeria
- Gloria Beiuș
- Electrometal Cluj-Napoca
- Victoria Chimia Zalău
- CSU-Mecanica Sibiu
- Lacul Ursu Sovata
- Torpedo Zărnești
- IPT Întorsura Buzăului
- Victoria Florești

=== From Divizia C ===
Promoted to Divizia B

- Minerul Vatra Dornei
- Aripile Bacău
- Delta Tulcea
- Dunărea Călărași
- ICSIM București
- Muscelul Câmpulung
- Electroputere Craiova
- Metalul Bocșa
- Înfrățirea Oradea
- CIL Sighetu Marmației
- Mecanica Orăștie
- ICIM Brașov

Relegated to County Championship

- Tepro Iași
- ASA Câmpulung Moldovenesc
- Letea Bacău
- Viticultorul Panciu
- Avântul Matca
- Chimpex Constanța
- Rapid Fetești
- Victoria Lehliu
- Aversa București
- Luceafărul București
- Dunărea Venus Zimnicea
- Știința Drăgănești-Olt
- Metalul Râmnicu Vâlcea
- Dunărea Calafat
- Victoria Ineu
- CFR Arad
- Silvania Cehu Silvaniei
- Constructorul Satu Mare
- IS Sighetu Marmației
- Minerul Baia Borșa
- Soda Ocna Mureș
- Târnavele Blaj
- Celuloza Zărnești
- Textila Prejmer

=== Renamed teams ===
Electro Siretul Bucecea was renamed as CSM Bucecea.

Petrolistul Râmnicu Sărat was renamed as Voința Petrolul Râmnicu Sărat.

Foresta Gugești was renamed as Victoria Gugești.

Metalul Huși was renamed as Steaua Mecanica Huși.

Victoria Tecuci was renamed as Victoria IRA Tecuci.

Constructorul TCIAZ Giurgiu was renamed as Constructorul IACPB Giurgiu.

Metalul Scornicești was renamed as Viitorul Scornicești.

Unirea Alexandria was renamed as Automatica Alexandria.

Victoria Craiova was renamed as Armata Craiova.

Pandurii Târgu Jiu was renamed as Gloria Pandurii Târgu Jiu.

IMIX Agnita was renamed as Carpați Agnita.

Petrolul Băicoi was renamed as Petrolul FSH Băicoi.

=== Other changes ===
Dunărea Giurgiu took the place of ICPB Bolintin-Vale.

== League tables ==
=== Seria I ===
Pos	Team	Pld	W	D	L	GF	GA	GD	Pts	Promotion or relegation
1	Minerul Gura Humorului (C, P)	30	23	1	6	60	25	+35	70	Promotion to Divizia B
2	Siretul Pașcani	30	21	2	7	72	29	+43	65	
3	Relonul Săvinești	30	13	7	10	56	37	+19	46	
4	Explorări Câmpulung Moldovenesc	30	13	6	11	58	39	+19	45	
5	Cetatea Târgu Neamț	30	13	5	12	39	48	−9	44	
6	Laminorul Roman	30	13	4	13	37	30	+7	43	
7	Metalul Rădăuți	30	13	3	14	40	41	−1	42	
8	Constructorul Iași	30	12	4	14	41	47	−6	40	
9	Carpați Gălănești	30	13	0	17	31	53	−22	39	
10	Electro Luceafărul Botoșani	30	12	2	16	51	52	−1	38	
11	Cristalul Dorohoi	30	12	2	16	45	50	−5	38	
12	Avântul TCMM Frasin	30	11	5	14	39	47	−8	38	
13	Zimbrul Siret	30	12	2	16	40	53	−13	38	
14	CSM Bucecea	30	11	5	14	50	72	−22	38	
15	Danubiana Roman (R)	30	11	4	15	46	57	−11	37	Relegation to County Championship
16	Celuloza Bradul Roznov (R)	30	10	2	18	26	51	−25	32	Relegation to County Championship

Source: romaniansoccer.ro
Rules for classification: 1) points; 2) goal difference; 3) number of goals scored.
(C) Champions; (P) Promoted; (R) Relegated

=== Seria II ===
Pos	Team	Pld	W	D	L	GF	GA	GD	Pts	Promotion or relegation
1	Unirea Dinamo Focșani (C, P)	30	23	3	4	84	25	+59	70 (Note: Unirea Dinamo Focșani and Petrolul Moinești deducted 2 points.)	Promotion to Divizia B
2	Inter Vaslui	30	20	4	6	50	21	+29	64	
3	Mecanica Vaslui	30	16	5	9	58	28	+30	53	
4	CSM Borzești	30	13	7	10	48	33	+15	46	
5	Steaua Mecanica Huși	30	15	1	14	47	44	+3	46	
6	Unirea Negrești	30	13	3	14	32	52	−20	42	
7	Partizanul Bacău	30	12	5	13	48	33	+15	41	
8	Petrolul Moinești	30	12	7	11	44	36	+8	41	
9	Minerul Comănești	30	12	5	13	42	61	−19	41	
10	Textila Buhuși	30	12	2	16	41	48	−7	38	
11	Constructorul Flacăra Odobești	30	12	2	16	37	50	−13	38	
12	Proletarul Bacău	30	12	1	17	48	55	−7	37	
13	Victoria Gugești	30	12	1	17	26	45	−19	37	
14	Luceafărul Adjud	30	10	4	16	27	31	−4	34	
15	Voința Petrolul Râmnicu Sărat (R)	30	10	3	17	36	69	−33	33	Relegation to County Championship
16	Chimia Mărășești (R)	30	8	3	19	27	64	−37	27	Relegation to County Championship

Source: romaniansoccer.ro
Rules for classification: 1) points; 2) goal difference; 3) number of goals scored.
(C) Champions; (P) Promoted; (R) Relegated

=== Seria III ===
Pos	Team	Pld	W	D	L	GF	GA	GD	Pts	Promotion or relegation
1	FEPA 74 Bârlad (C, P)	30	19	5	6	64	29	+35	62	Promotion to Divizia B
2	Petrolul Ianca Brăila	30	15	3	12	39	38	+1	48	
3	Chimia Brăila	30	14	3	13	49	42	+7	45	
4	Petrolul Berca	30	15	1	14	45	39	+6	44 (Note: Petrolul Berca and ASA Buzău deducted 2 points.)	
5	Progresul Isaccea	30	14	1	15	43	65	−22	43	
6	Chimia Victoria Buzău	30	13	3	14	50	40	+10	42	
7	Laminorul Viziru	30	13	3	14	43	39	+4	42	
8	Metalul Buzău	30	13	3	14	34	32	+2	42	
9	DVA Portul Galați	30	12	6	12	32	32	0	42	
10	Arrubium Măcin	30	13	3	14	35	48	−13	42	
11	Carpați Nehoiu	30	13	2	15	45	46	−1	41	
12	Șantierul Naval Tulcea	30	13	2	15	35	39	−4	41	
13	Victoria IRA Tecuci	30	12	5	13	42	46	−4	41	
14	Granitul Babadag	30	13	2	15	40	46	−6	41	
15	ASA Buzău (R)	30	13	2	15	42	50	−8	39	Relegation to County Championship
16	Ancora Galați (R)	30	12	2	16	38	45	−7	38	Relegation to County Championship

Source: romaniansoccer.ro
Rules for classification: 1) points; 2) goal difference; 3) number of goals scored.
(C) Champions; (P) Promoted; (R) Relegated

=== Seria IV ===
Pos	Team	Pld	W	D	L	GF	GA	GD	Pts	Promotion or relegation
1	Unirea Slobozia (C, P)	30	21	2	7	80	32	+48	65	Promotion to Divizia B
2	Sportul 30 Decembrie	30	19	6	5	59	17	+42	63	
3	Portul Constanța	30	16	3	11	51	29	+22	51	
4	IMU Medgidia	30	15	3	12	55	33	+22	48	
5	ISCIP Ulmeni	30	13	7	10	37	33	+4	46	
6	Voința Constanța	30	12	6	12	53	46	+7	42	
7	Șantierul Naval Oltenița	30	12	6	12	46	49	−3	42	
8	Unirea Urziceni	30	12	3	15	42	64	−22	39	
9	Cimentul Medgidia	30	11	5	14	55	51	+4	38	
10	Viitorul Chirnogi	30	13	1	16	37	55	−18	38 (Note: Viitorul Chirnogi, Victoria Țăndărei and Olimpia Slobozia deducted 2 points.)	
11	Dunărea Giurgiu	30	10	7	13	36	40	−4	37	
12	Metalul Mangalia	30	10	6	14	44	47	−3	36	
13	Victoria Țăndărei	30	11	4	15	37	56	−19	35	
14	Olimpia Slobozia	30	11	4	15	36	66	−30	35	
15	Marina Mangalia (R)	30	10	4	16	25	56	−31	34	Relegation to County Championship
16	Electrica Constanța (R)	30	7	7	16	29	48	−19	28	Relegation to County Championship

Source: romaniansoccer.ro
Rules for classification: 1) points; 2) goal difference; 3) number of goals scored.
(C) Champions; (P) Promoted; (R) Relegated

=== Seria V ===
Pos	Team	Pld	W	D	L	GF	GA	GD	Pts	Promotion or relegation
1	Autobuzul București (C, P)	30	20	4	6	52	18	+34	61 (Note: Autobuzul București and Avicola Crevedia deducted 3 points.)	Promotion to Divizia B
2	IUPS Chitila	30	18	3	9	50	30	+20	57	
3	Mecon București	30	16	5	9	52	36	+16	53	
4	Metalul București	30	14	6	10	55	28	+27	48	
5	Avicola Crevedia	30	13	9	8	45	32	+13	45	
6	Metalul Mija	30	12	8	10	52	38	+14	44	
7	Electrica Titu	30	13	4	13	57	46	+11	43	
8	Voința București	30	13	3	14	35	48	−13	42	
9	Abatorul București	30	11	8	11	37	31	+6	41	
10	Tehnometal București	30	11	7	12	45	46	−1	40	
11	Viscofil București	30	12	4	14	45	47	−2	40	
12	Cimentul Fieni	30	11	6	13	32	36	−4	39	
13	Danubiana București	30	12	3	15	38	47	−9	39	
14	Chimia Găești	30	11	4	15	35	53	−18	37	
15	Flacăra Roșie București (R)	30	10	2	18	38	70	−32	32	Relegation to County Championship
16	Constructorul IACPB Giurgiu (R)	30	3	4	23	22	84	−62	13	Relegation to County Championship

Source: romaniansoccer.ro
Rules for classification: 1) points; 2) goal difference; 3) number of goals scored.
(C) Champions; (P) Promoted; (R) Relegated

=== Seria VI ===
Pos	Team	Pld	W	D	L	GF	GA	GD	Pts	Promotion or relegation
1	ROVA Roșiori (C, P)	30	19	4	7	66	33	+33	61	Promotion to Divizia B
2	Automatica Alexandria	30	18	4	8	48	17	+31	58	
3	Sportul Muncitoresc Caracal	30	14	3	13	50	36	+14	45	
4	Chimia Turnu Măgurele	30	14	2	14	50	38	+12	44	
5	Electronistul Curtea de Argeș	30	14	2	14	33	58	−25	44	
6	Viitorul Drăgășani	30	14	1	15	33	55	−22	43	
7	Viitorul Scornicești	30	11	8	11	36	34	+2	41	
8	Progresul Băilești	30	13	2	15	36	44	−8	41	
9	Recolta Stoicănești	30	13	2	15	56	46	+10	41	
10	Progresul Corabia	30	12	4	14	46	39	+7	40	
11	Constructorul TCI Craiova	30	12	4	14	46	41	+5	40	
12	Dacia Pitești	30	12	4	14	34	50	−16	40	
13	Textila Roșiori	30	12	4	14	26	38	−12	40	
14	CFR Craiova	30	11	6	13	43	33	+10	39	
15	Armata Craiova (R)	30	11	5	14	43	60	−17	38	Relegation to County Championship
16	Metalul Alexandria (R)	30	10	5	15	30	54	−24	35	Relegation to County Championship

Source: romaniansoccer.ro
Rules for classification: 1) points; 2) goal difference; 3) number of goals scored.
(C) Champions; (P) Promoted; (R) Relegated

=== Seria VII ===
Pos	Team	Pld	W	D	L	GF	GA	GD	Pts	Promotion or relegation
1	Gloria Pandurii Târgu Jiu (C, P)	30	20	2	8	63	19	+44	62	Promotion to Divizia B
2	Gloria Reșița	30	18	0	12	47	27	+20	54	
3	Minerul Moldova Nouă	30	15	2	13	47	41	+6	47	
4	Minerul Anina	30	15	1	14	65	40	+25	46	
5	Minerul Oravița	30	14	4	12	50	43	+7	46	
6	Metalul Oțelu Roșu	30	14	2	14	48	47	+1	44	
7	Dierna Orșova	30	14	2	14	39	50	−11	44	
8	Minerul Motru	30	13	4	13	38	40	−2	43	
9	Mecanizatorul Șimian	30	13	3	14	44	42	+2	42	
10	Minerul Mătăsari	30	13	2	15	42	41	+1	41	
11	Petrolul Țicleni	30	13	2	15	45	46	−1	41	
12	Jiul Rovinari	30	12	5	13	39	49	−10	41	
13	Armătura Strehaia	30	11	5	14	35	59	−24	38	
14	Metalurgistul Sadu	30	11	5	14	31	44	−13	38	
15	Chimistul Râmnicu Vâlcea (R)	30	11	4	15	29	52	−23	37	Relegation to County Championship
16	Forestierul Băbeni (R)	30	11	1	18	38	60	−22	34	Relegation to County Championship

Source: romaniansoccer.ro
Rules for classification: 1) points; 2) goal difference; 3) number of goals scored.
(C) Champions; (P) Promoted; (R) Relegated

=== Seria VIII ===
Pos	Team	Pld	W	D	L	GF	GA	GD	Pts	Promotion or relegation
1	Minerul Paroșeni (C, P)	30	17	5	8	60	27	+33	56	Promotion to Divizia B
2	CSM Lugoj	30	17	3	10	50	30	+20	54	
3	Rapid Arad	30	16	2	12	56	36	+20	50	
4	Minerul Știința Vulcan	30	14	5	11	51	36	+15	47	
5	UM Timișoara	30	13	6	11	50	40	+10	45	
6	Unirea Tomnatic	30	14	3	13	53	46	+7	45	
7	Strungul Chișineu-Criș	30	14	2	14	42	38	+4	44	
8	Obilici Sânmartinu Sârbesc	30	13	4	13	58	39	+19	43	
9	Șoimii Lipova	30	13	4	13	52	53	−1	43	
10	CFR Simeria	30	13	2	15	46	53	−7	41	
11	CSM Caransebeș	30	11	6	13	29	41	−12	39	
12	CFR Victoria Caransebeș	30	12	3	15	35	52	−17	39	
13	Victoria Călan	30	12	3	15	28	61	−33	39	
14	Unirea Sânnicolau Mare	30	12	2	16	45	52	−7	38	
15	Minerul Certej (R)	30	10	4	16	31	52	−21	34	Relegation to County Championship
16	Dacia Orăștie (R)	30	10	4	16	31	61	−30	34	Relegation to County Championship

Source: romaniansoccer.ro
Rules for classification: 1) points; 2) goal difference; 3) number of goals scored.
(C) Champions; (P) Promoted; (R) Relegated

=== Seria IX ===
Pos	Team	Pld	W	D	L	GF	GA	GD	Pts	Promotion or relegation
1	Steaua CFR Cluj-Napoca (C, P)	30	20	2	8	87	27	+60	62	Promotion to Divizia B
2	Metalurgistul Cugir	30	19	4	7	67	28	+39	61	
3	Sticla Arieșul Turda	30	17	3	10	60	42	+18	54	
4	Oțelul Bihor	30	15	7	8	53	32	+21	52	
5	Metalul Aiud	30	16	2	12	47	36	+11	50	
6	Industria Sârmei Câmpia Turzii	30	13	4	13	49	35	+14	42 (Note: Industria Sârmei Câmpia Turzii deducted 1 point.)	
7	Mecanica Alba Iulia	30	12	3	15	51	55	−4	39	
8	Minerul Șuncuiuș	30	11	6	13	40	47	−7	39	
9	Minerul Bihor	30	12	3	15	38	48	−10	39	
10	Gloria Beiuș	30	11	6	13	37	56	−19	39	
11	Viitorul IRA Cluj-Napoca	30	12	2	16	35	47	−12	38	
12	Recolta Salonta	30	12	2	16	39	55	−16	38	
13	Unirea Valea lui Mihai	30	12	2	16	65	53	+12	38	
14	Olimpia Gherla	30	11	5	14	35	59	−24	38	
15	Voința Oradea (R)	30	11	1	18	30	56	−26	34	Relegation to County Championship
16	Electrometal Cluj-Napoca (R)	30	9	2	19	38	62	−24	29	Relegation to County Championship

Source: romaniansoccer.ro
Rules for classification: 1) points; 2) goal difference; 3) number of goals scored.
(C) Champions; (P) Promoted; (R) Relegated

=== Seria X ===
Pos	Team	Pld	W	D	L	GF	GA	GD	Pts	Promotion or relegation
1	Unio Satu Mare (C, P)	30	18	5	7	61	22	+39	59	Promotion to Divizia B
2	Someșul Satu Mare	30	15	7	8	48	25	+23	52	
3	Chimforest Năsăud	30	17	0	13	50	34	+16	51	
4	Minerul Băiuț	30	16	2	12	50	39	+11	50	
5	Victoria FIUT Carei	30	14	4	12	45	26	+19	46	
6	Chimia Tășnad	30	14	1	15	48	49	−1	43	
7	Oașul Negrești-Oaș	30	14	1	15	36	46	−10	43	
8	Minerul Băița	30	13	3	14	37	41	−4	42	
9	Energia Progresul Beclean	30	12	5	13	34	39	−5	41	
10	Minerul Sărmășag	30	13	2	15	36	43	−7	41	
11	Bradul Vișeu de Sus	30	12	5	13	28	39	−11	41	
12	Minerul Baia Sprie	30	11	7	12	36	34	+2	40	
13	Victoria Chimia Zalău	30	11	3	16	29	50	−21	36	
14	Minerul Rodna	30	11	5	14	35	44	−9	35 (Note: Minerul Rodna and Cuprom Baia Mare deducted 3 points.)	
15	Lăpușul Târgu Lăpuș (R)	30	11	2	17	30	57	−27	35	Relegation to County Championship
16	Cuprom Baia Mare (R)	30	11	2	17	39	57	−18	32	Relegation to County Championship

Source: romaniansoccer.ro
Rules for classification: 1) points; 2) goal difference; 3) number of goals scored.
(C) Champions; (P) Promoted; (R) Relegated

=== Seria XI ===
Pos	Team	Pld	W	D	L	GF	GA	GD	Pts	Promotion or relegation
1	Inter Sibiu (C, P)	30	19	4	7	71	24	+47	61	Promotion to Divizia B
2	Electromureș Târgu Mureș	30	19	4	7	64	23	+41	61	
3	Progresul Odorheiu Secuiesc	30	16	6	8	47	32	+15	54	
4	Metalotehnica Târgu Mureș	30	16	2	12	58	36	+22	50	
5	Carpați Agnita	30	15	2	13	36	37	−1	47	
6	Unirea Cristuru Secuiesc	30	13	4	13	37	41	−4	43	
7	Minerul Bălan	30	13	2	15	35	52	−17	41	
8	Unirea Ocna Sibiului	30	12	4	14	32	54	−22	40	
9	Viitorul Gheorgheni	30	12	3	15	34	38	−4	39	
10	Mureșul Luduș	30	11	5	14	37	40	−3	38	
11	CSU-Mecanica Sibiu	30	12	2	16	41	45	−4	38	
12	Oțelul Reghin	30	11	5	14	40	46	−6	38	
13	Metalul Sighișoara	30	11	5	14	34	41	−7	38	
14	Minerul Baraolt	30	11	5	14	30	40	−10	38	
15	Mureșul Toplița (R)	30	11	4	15	39	44	−5	37	Relegation to County Championship
16	Lacul Ursu Sovata (R)	30	8	3	19	24	66	−42	27	Relegation to County Championship

Source: romaniansoccer.ro
Rules for classification: 1) points; 2) goal difference; 3) number of goals scored.
(C) Champions; (P) Promoted; (R) Relegated

=== Seria XII ===
Pos	Team	Pld	W	D	L	GF	GA	GD	Pts	Promotion or relegation
1	Poiana Câmpina (C, P)	30	18	4	8	51	31	+20	58	Promotion to Divizia B
2	Nitramonia Făgăraș	30	16	2	12	62	33	+29	50	
3	Metalul Târgu Secuiesc	30	14	3	13	52	33	+19	45	
4	Minerul Filipeștii de Pădure	30	13	5	12	37	36	+1	44	
5	Mobila Măgura Codlea	30	14	2	14	36	48	−12	44	
6	Torpedo Zărnești	30	14	1	15	35	36	−1	43	
7	Carpați Sinaia	30	14	1	15	39	44	−5	43	
8	IPT Întorsura Buzăului	30	13	4	13	42	51	−9	43	
9	Chimia Brazi	30	12	6	12	47	28	+19	42	
10	Petrolul FSH Băicoi	30	13	3	14	33	42	−9	42	
11	Cimentul Hoghiz	30	13	3	14	33	46	−13	42	
12	Electro Sfântu Gheorghe	30	13	3	14	37	54	−17	42	
13	Precizia Săcele	30	12	5	13	34	40	−6	41	
14	Victoria Florești	30	11	6	13	49	47	+2	39	
15	Metrom Brașov (R)	30	11	6	13	36	37	−1	39	Relegation to County Championship
16	Utilajul Făgăraș (R)	30	9	6	15	38	55	−17	33	Relegation to County Championship

Source: romaniansoccer.ro
Rules for classification: 1) points; 2) goal difference; 3) number of goals scored.
(C) Champions; (P) Promoted; (R) Relegated

== See also ==
- 1985–86 Divizia A
- 1985–86 Divizia B
- 1985–86 County Championship
- 1985–86 Cupa României
