= Liga IV Sălaj =

Fourth tier Romanian football league

- Founded: 1968
- Country: Romania
- Level on pyramid: 4
- Promotion to: Liga III
- Relegation to: Liga V Sălaj
- Domestic cup: Cupa României – County phase
- Current champions: Barcău Nușfalău (2nd title) (2025–26)
- Most championships: Rapid Jibou (12 titles)
- Website: frf-ajf.ro/salaj
- Current: 2025–26 Liga IV Sălaj

Liga IV Sălaj is one of the regional football divisions of Liga IV, the fourth tier of the Romanian football league system, for clubs based in Sălaj County, and is organized by AJF Sălaj – Asociația Județeană de Fotbal (lit. 'County Football Association').

It is contested by a variable number of teams, depending on the number of teams relegated from Liga III, the number of teams promoted from Liga V Sălaj, and the teams that withdraw or enter the competition. The winner may or may not be promoted to Liga III, depending on the result of a promotion play-off contested against the winner of a neighboring county series.

== History ==
In 1968, following the new administrative and territorial reorganization of the country, each county established its own football championship, integrating teams from the former regional championships as well as those that had previously competed in town and rayon level competitions. The freshly formed Sălaj County Championship was placed under the authority of the newly created Consiliul Județean pentru Educație Fizică și Sport (lit. 'County Council for Physical Education and Sports') in Sălaj County.

Since then, the structure and organization of Liga IV Sălaj, like those of other county championships, have undergone numerous changes. Between 1968 and 1992, the main county competition was known as the Campionatul Județean (County Championship). Between 1992 and 1997, it was renamed Divizia C – Faza Județeană (Divizia C – County Phase), followed by Divizia D starting in 1997, and since 2006, it has been known as Liga IV.

== Promotion ==
The champions of each county association play against one another in a play-off to earn promotion to Liga III. Geographical criteria are taken into consideration when the play-offs are drawn. In total, there are 41 county champions plus the Bucharest municipal champion.

== List of Champions ==
Ed.	Season	Winners
County Championship
1	1968–69	Progresul Cehu Silvaniei
2	1969–70	Măgura Șimleu Silvaniei
3	1970–71	Măgura Șimleu Silvaniei
4	1971–72	Rapid Jibou
5	1972–73	Victoria Zalău
6	1973–74	Minerul Sărmășag
7	1974–75	Mobila Șimleu Silvaniei
8	1975–76	Victoria Zalău
9	1976–77	Rapid Jibou
10	1977–78	Viitorul Șimleu Silvaniei
11	1978–79	Victoria Elcond Zalău
12	1979–80	Rapid Jibou
13	1980–81	Silvania Cehu Silvaniei
14	1981–82	Minerul Sărmășag
15	1982–83	Chimia Zalău
16	1983–84	Izolatorul Armătura Șimleu Silvaniei
17	1984–85	Victoria Chimia Zalău
18	1985–86	Silvania Cehu Silvaniei
19	1986–87	Izomat Șimleu Silvaniei
20	1987–88	Rapid Jibou
21	1988–89	Silvania Cehu Silvaniei
22	1989–90	Rapid Jibou
23	1990–91	Rapid Jibou
24	1991–92	Minerul Ip
Divizia C – County phase
25	1992–93	Minerul Sărmășag
26	1993–94	Minerul Sărmășag
27	1994–95	Mobila Șimleu Silvaniei
28	1995–96	Minerul Sărmășag
29	1996–97	Minerul Sărmășag
Divizia D
30	1997–98	Minerul Sărmășag
31	1998–99	Silvania Cehu Silvaniei
32	1999–00	Chimia Zalău
33	2000–01	Rapid Jibou
34	2001–02	Rapid Jibou
35	2002–03	Mobila Șimleu Silvaniei
36	2003–04	Juventus Crișeni
37	2004–05	Rapid Jibou
38	2005–06	Zalău

Ed.	Season	Winners
Liga IV
39	2006–07	Zalău
40	2007–08	Zalău
41	2008–09	Silvania Șimleu Silvaniei II
42	2009–10	Someșul Ileanda
43	2010–11	Meseșul Treznea
44	2011–12	Flacăra Halmășd
45	2012–13	Rapid Jibou
46	2013–14	Sportul Șimleu Silvaniei
47	2014–15	Luceafărul Bălan
48	2015–16	Unirea Mirșid
49	2016–17	Dumbrava Gâlgău Almașului
50	2017–18	Unirea Mirșid
51	2018–19	Unirea Mirșid
52	2019–20	Sportul Șimleu Silvaniei
53	2020–21	Rapid Jibou
54	2021–22	Rapid Jibou
55	2022–23	Luceafărul Bălan
56	2023–24	Barcău Nușfalău
57	2024–25	Chieșd
58	2025–26	Barcău Nușfalău

== See also ==
=== Main Leagues ===
- Liga I
- Liga II
- Liga III
- Liga IV

=== County Leagues (Liga IV series) ===
North–East

- Liga IV Bacău
- Liga IV Botoșani
- Liga IV Iași
- Liga IV Neamț
- Liga IV Suceava
- Liga IV Vaslui

North–West

- Liga IV Bihor
- Liga IV Bistrița-Năsăud
- Liga IV Cluj
- Liga IV Maramureș
- Liga IV Satu Mare
- Liga IV Sălaj

Center

- Liga IV Alba
- Liga IV Brașov
- Liga IV Covasna
- Liga IV Harghita
- Liga IV Mureș
- Liga IV Sibiu

West

- Liga IV Arad
- Liga IV Caraș-Severin
- Liga IV Gorj
- Liga IV Hunedoara
- Liga IV Mehedinți
- Liga IV Timiș

South–West

- Liga IV Argeș
- Liga IV Dâmbovița
- Liga IV Dolj
- Liga IV Olt
- Liga IV Teleorman
- Liga IV Vâlcea

South

- Liga IV Bucharest
- Liga IV Călărași
- Liga IV Giurgiu
- Liga IV Ialomița
- Liga IV Ilfov
- Liga IV Prahova

South–East

- Liga IV Brăila
- Liga IV Buzău
- Liga IV Constanța
- Liga IV Galați
- Liga IV Tulcea
- Liga IV Vrancea
