= Liga IV Neamț =

Fourth tier Romanian football league

- Founded: 1968
- Country: Romania
- Level on pyramid: 4
- Promotion to: Liga III
- Relegation to: Liga V Neamț
- Domestic cup: Cupa României – County phase
- Current champions: Cimentul Bicaz (6th title) (2025–26)
- Most championships: Roman and Cimentul Bicaz (6 titles each)
- Website: frf-ajf.ro/neamt
- Current: 2025–26 Liga IV Neamț

Liga IV Neamț is one of the regional football divisions of Liga IV, the fourth tier of the Romanian football league system, for clubs based in Neamț County, and is organized by AJF Neamț – Asociația Județeană de Fotbal (lit. 'County Football Association').

It is contested by a variable number of teams, depending on the number of teams relegated from Liga III, the number of teams promoted from Liga V Neamț, and the teams that withdraw or enter the competition. The winner may or may not be promoted to Liga III, depending on the result of a promotion play-off contested against the winner of a neighboring county series.

== History ==
In the decades following the 1950 administrative and territorial organization of the Romanian People's Republic, football teams from the area of Neamț County developed within the Bacău Region, where local teams competed in Bacău regional and rayon championships.

In 1968, following the new administrative and territorial reorganization of the country, each county established its own football championship, incorporating teams from the former regional championships as well as those that had previously competed at town and rayon level. The newly formed Neamț County Championship was placed under the authority of the Consiliul Județean pentru Educație Fizică și Sport (lit. 'County Council for Physical Education and Sports').

Since then, the structure and organization of Neamț’s main county competition, as well as other county championships, have undergone several changes. Between 1968 and 1992, the competition was known as Campionatul Județean (County Championship). Beginning in 1992, football in Neamț County was organized under the Asociația Județeană de Fotbal (lit. 'County Football Association'), and the competition was renamed Divizia C – Faza Județeană (Divizia C – County Phase). In 1997, it was renamed Divizia D, and since 2006 it has been known as Liga IV, following a trademark dispute involving the name Divizia A, after which the Romanian Football Federation decided to standardize the naming of the lower leagues.

== Promotion ==
The champions of each county association play against one another in a play-off to earn promotion to Liga III. Geographical criteria are taken into consideration when the play-offs are drawn. In total, there are 41 county champions plus the Bucharest municipal champion.

== List of Champions ==
Ed.	Season	Winners
County Championship
1	1968–69	Constructorul Piatra Neamț
2	1969–70	Cimentul Bicaz
3	1970–71	Danubiana Roman
4	1971–72	Relonul Săvinești
5	1972–73	Bradul Roznov
6	1973–74	Laminorul Roman
7	1974–75	Ozana Târgu Neamț
8	1975–76	ITA Piatra Neamț
9	1976–77	IJIL Piatra Neamț
10	1977–78	Danubiana Roman
11	1978–79	Celuloza Piatra Neamț
12	1979–80	CPL Piatra Neamț
13	1980–81	Voința Roznov
14	1981–82	AZO-TCM Săvinești
15	1982–83	Cimentul Bicaz
16	1983–84	Danubiana Roman
17	1984–85	Danubiana Roman
18	1985–86	Metalul IM Roman
19	1986–87	Celuloza ITA Piatra Neamț
20	1987–88	Metalul IM Roman
21	1988–89	Voința Roman
22	1989–90	Voința Roman
23	1990–91	Laminorul Roman
24	1991–92	CSȘ Roman
Divizia C – County phase
25	1992–93	Laminorul Roman
26	1993–94	Laminorul Roman
27	1994–95	Cimentul Bicaz
28	1995–96	Cimentul Bicaz
29	1996–97	Laminorul Roman
Divizia D
30	1997–98	Cimentul Bicaz
31	1998–99	Ozana Târgu Neamț
32	1999–00	CSȘ Târgu Neamț
33	2000–01	Sirius Bodești
34	2001–02	Hidroconstrucția Poiana Teiului
35	2002–03	Laminorul Roman II
36	2003–04	LPS Piatra Neamț
37	2004–05	Flacăra Brusturi
38	2005–06	Ceahlăul Piatra Neamț II

Ed.	Season	Winners
Liga IV
39	2006–07	Cetatea Târgu Neamț
40	2007–08	Voința Pângărați
41	2008–09	Voința Pângărați
42	2009–10	Energia Girov
43	2010–11	Energia Girov
44	2011–12	Biruința Negrești
45	2012–13	Cetatea Târgu Neamț
46	2013–14	Voința Ion Creangă
47	2014–15	Speranța Răucești
48	2015–16	Voința Ion Creangă
49	2016–17	Teiul Poiana Teiului
50	2017–18	Ceahlăul Piatra Neamț
51	2018–19	Ozana Târgu Neamț
52	2019–20	Bradu Borca
–	2020–21	Not disputed (Note: Not disputed due to COVID-19 pandemic in Romania)
53	2021–22	Speranța Răucești
54	2022–23	Victoria Horia
55	2023–24	Ceahlăul Piatra Neamț II
56	2024–25	Roman
57	2025–26	Cimentul Bicaz

== See also ==
=== Main Leagues ===
- Liga I
- Liga II
- Liga III
- Liga IV

=== County Leagues (Liga IV series) ===
North–East

- Liga IV Bacău
- Liga IV Botoșani
- Liga IV Iași
- Liga IV Neamț
- Liga IV Suceava
- Liga IV Vaslui

North–West

- Liga IV Bihor
- Liga IV Bistrița-Năsăud
- Liga IV Cluj
- Liga IV Maramureș
- Liga IV Satu Mare
- Liga IV Sălaj

Center

- Liga IV Alba
- Liga IV Brașov
- Liga IV Covasna
- Liga IV Harghita
- Liga IV Mureș
- Liga IV Sibiu

West

- Liga IV Arad
- Liga IV Caraș-Severin
- Liga IV Gorj
- Liga IV Hunedoara
- Liga IV Mehedinți
- Liga IV Timiș

South–West

- Liga IV Argeș
- Liga IV Dâmbovița
- Liga IV Dolj
- Liga IV Olt
- Liga IV Teleorman
- Liga IV Vâlcea

South

- Liga IV Bucharest
- Liga IV Călărași
- Liga IV Giurgiu
- Liga IV Ialomița
- Liga IV Ilfov
- Liga IV Prahova

South–East

- Liga IV Brăila
- Liga IV Buzău
- Liga IV Constanța
- Liga IV Galați
- Liga IV Tulcea
- Liga IV Vrancea
