= 1985–86 County Championship =

44th season of the Liga IV, the fourth tier of the Romanian football league

Liga IV
- Season: 1985–86

The 1985–86 County Championship was the 44th season of the Liga IV, the fourth tier of the Romanian football league system. The champions of each county association play against one from a neighboring county in a play-off to gain promotion to Divizia C.

== County championships ==
- Alba (AB)
- Arad (AR)
- Argeș (AG)
- Bacău (BC)
- Bihor (BH)
- Bistrița-Năsăud (BN)
- Botoșani (BT)
- Brașov (BV)
- Brăila (BR)
- Bucharest (B)
- Buzău (BZ)
- Caraș-Severin (CS)
- Călărași (CL)
- Cluj (CJ)
- Constanța (CT)
- Covasna (CV)
- Dâmbovița (DB)
- Dolj (DJ)
- Galați (GL)
- Giurgiu (GR)
- Gorj (GJ)
- Harghita (HR)
- Hunedoara (HD)
- Ialomița (IL)
- Iași (IS)
- Ilfov (IF)
- Maramureș (MM)
- Mehedinți (MH)
- Mureș (MS)
- Neamț (NT)
- Olt (OT)
- Prahova (PH)
- Satu Mare (SM)
- Sălaj (SJ)
- Sibiu (SB)
- Suceava (SV)
- Teleorman (TR)
- Timiș (TM)
- Tulcea (TL)
- Vaslui (VS)
- Vâlcea (VL)
- Vrancea (VN)

== Promotion play-off ==
Teams promoted to Divizia C without a play-off matches as teams from less represented counties in the third division.

- (BT) Metalul Botoșani
- (SJ) Silvania Cehu Silvanlei
- (GL) Gloria Galați
- (VL) Lotru Brezoi
- (VN) Energia Focșani
- (IS) Tepro Iași
- (GR) Petrolul Roata de Jos

Preliminary round

Team 1	Agg.	Team 2	1st leg	2nd leg
CFR BTA București (B)	1–0	(IF) IAB Pantelimon	0–0	1–0

The matches was played on 6 and 13 July 1986.

Team 1	Agg.	Team 2	1st leg	2nd leg
Flacăra Murgeni (VS)	4–5	(NT) Metalul IM Roman	3–2	1–3
Minerul Mahmudia (TL)	5–4	(BR) Progresul Brăila	4–1	1–3
Locomotiva Buzău (BZ)	1–4	(PH) Sportul Muncitoresc Câmpina	1–1	0–3
Jiul IELIF Craiova (DJ)	3–5	(MH) Înainte Foresta Vânju Mare	2–1	1–4
Automecanica Reșița (CS)	1–4	(TM) Progresul Timișoara	0–2	1–2
Energia Rovinari (GJ)	3–5	(HD) Minerul Ghelari	2–1	1–4
Bihoreana Marghita (BH)	3–2	(CJ) CM Cluj-Napoca	2–0	1–2
Carpați Brașov (BV)	1–1 (4–5 p)	(SB) Automecanica Mediaș	1–0	0–1
Foresta Satu Mare (SM)	0–2	(MM) Minerul Baia Borșa	0–1	0–1
Metalul Reghin (MS)	5–4	(HR) Tractorul Miercurea Ciuc	4–2	1–2
CFR BTA București (B)	5–1	(IL) Rapid Fetești	5–0	0–1
CFR Arad (AR)	1–5	(AB) Tâmavele Blaj	1–3	0–2
Victoria Lehliu (CL)	2–2 (Note: Victoria Lehliu won on the away goals rule.)	(CT) Litoral Mangalia	1–0	1–2
Minerul Șotânga (DB)	2–1	(TR) Cetatea Turnu Măgurele	2–0	0–1
Rapid Piatra-Olt (OT)	1–4	(AG) Constructorul Pitești	1–2	0–2
Carpați Covasna (CV)	4–5	(BC) Letea Bacău	4–2	0–3
Unirea Emil Bodnăraș (SV)	4–7	(BN) Mecanica Bistrița	3–4	1–3

== Championships standings ==
=== Bihor County ===
Pos	Team	Pld	W	D	L	GF	GA	GD	Pts	Qualification or relegation
1	Bihoreana Marghita (C, Q)	30	24	1	5	85	19	+66	49	Qualification to promotion play-off
2	Stăruința Săcuieni	30	22	3	5	68	24	+44	47	
3	Crișul Aleșd	30	19	3	8	63	24	+39	41	
4	Victoria Avram Iancu	30	17	2	11	58	45	+13	36	
5	IAMT Oradea	30	16	3	11	55	33	+22	35	
6	Minerul Voivozi	30	12	9	9	35	31	+4	33	
7	Crișana Tinca	30	14	1	15	50	48	+2	29	
8	Recolta Diosig	30	13	3	14	51	49	+2	29	
9	Biharea Vașcău	30	14	1	15	47	47	0	29	
10	Termalul Livada	30	11	4	15	48	52	−4	26	
11	Avântul Mizieș	30	10	4	16	40	57	−17	24	
12	Stînca Vadu Crișului	30	10	4	16	42	65	−23	24	
13	Sticla Pădurea Neagră	30	10	4	16	27	77	−50	24	
14	Cetatea Biharia	30	10	3	17	31	58	−27	23	
15	Constructorul Oradea (R)	30	7	3	20	28	57	−29	17	Relegation to Bihor County Championship II
16	Lotus Băile Felix (R)	30	5	4	21	18	60	−42	14	Relegation to Bihor County Championship II

Rules for classification: 1) Points; 2) Goal difference; 3) Number of goals scored.
(C) Champions; (Q) Qualified for the phase indicated; (R) Relegated

=== Botoșani County ===
Pos	Team	Pld	W	D	L	GF	GA	GD	Pts	Qualification or relegation
1	Metalul Botoșani (C, Q)	30	27	2	1	113	9	+104	56	Qualification to promotion play-off
2	Avântul Abator Răchiți	30	19	5	6	86	35	+51	43	
3	ASSAI Botoșani	30	21	1	8	61	20	+41	43	
4	Sănătatea Darabani	30	18	1	11	58	39	+19	36 (Note: Sănătatea Darabani, Textila Botoșani and Acumularea Rogojești deducted 1 point.)	
5	Săveni	30	16	5	9	72	43	+29	34 (Note: Săveni and Flacăra Flămânzi deducted 3 points.)	
6	Viitorul Dersca	30	14	6	10	71	58	+13	34	
7	Ceramica Dorohoi	30	15	6	9	49	37	+12	34 (Note: Ceramica Dorohoi, Sportivul Trușești and Voința Șendriceni deducted 2 points.)	
8	Unirea Stăuceni	30	12	7	11	59	48	+11	31	
9	Sportivul Trușești	30	11	3	16	57	63	−6	23	
10	Textila Botoșani	30	9	6	15	42	63	−21	23	
11	Spicul Iacobeni	30	12	2	16	50	70	−20	22 (Note: Spicul Iacobeni and Avântul Albești deducted 4 points.)	
12	Acumularea Rogojești	30	10	3	17	45	84	−39	22	
13	Flacăra Flămânzi	30	10	2	18	45	70	−25	19	
14	Voința Șendriceni	30	9	1	20	55	88	−33	17	
15	Avântul Albești	30	8	0	22	45	94	−49	12	
16	Zorile Roma (R)	30	2	2	26	23	116	−93	6	Relegation to Botoșani County Championship II

Rules for classification: 1) Points; 2) Goal difference; 3) Number of goals scored.
(C) Champions; (Q) Qualified for the phase indicated; (R) Relegated

=== Bucharest ===
The ranking combined points of the senior (3 points for a win) and junior (2 points for a win) teams.

Pos	Team	Pld	W	D	L	GF	GA	GD	Pts	Qualification or relegation
1	CFR BTA București (C, Q)	64	43	15	6	119	43	+76	101	Qualification to promotion play-off
2	IMGB București	64	43	11	10	151	54	+97	97	
3	ICME București	64	38	12	14	100	48	+52	88	
4	Automecanica București	64	25	15	24	77	75	+4	65	
5	Laromet București	64	26	11	27	95	100	−5	63	
6	Mecos București	64	27	8	29	104	105	−1	62	
7	Aversa București	64	24	12	28	92	115	−22	59	
8	Gloria București	64	22	14	28	91	96	−5	58	
9	Calculatorul București	64	24	10	30	84	97	−13	58	
10	Mașini Unelte București	64	17	24	23	70	98	−28	58	
11	URBIS București	64	22	12	30	84	90	−6	56	
12	Chimistul București	64	22	12	30	80	96	−16	56	
13	Electroaparataj București	64	20	16	28	75	95	−20	56	
14	Granitul București	64	20	16	28	72	95	−23	56	
15	Electra București	64	20	14	30	63	92	−29	54	
16	Vulcan București	64	19	13	32	70	102	−32	51	
17	Icar București	64	17	15	32	75	106	−31	49	Relegation to Bucharest Championship II

Rules for classification: 1) Points; 2) Goal difference; 3) Number of goals scored.
(C) Champion; (Q) Qualified for the phase indicated

=== Caraș-Severin County ===
Pos	Team	Pld	W	D	L	GF	GA	GD	Pts	Qualification or relegation
1	Automecanica Reșița (C, Q)	30	25	2	3	89	17	+72	77	Qualification to promotion play-off
2	Hercules ACH Băile Herculane	30	19	4	7	73	32	+41	61	
3	Metalul Reșița	30	19	4	7	70	34	+36	61	
4	Muncitorul Știința Reșița	30	15	5	10	60	40	+20	50	
5	Minerul Ocna de Fier	30	13	8	9	50	46	+4	47	
6	Metalul Topleț	30	15	0	15	77	41	+36	45	
7	Foresta Zăvoi	30	14	2	14	38	40	−2	44	
8	Energia ACH Caransebeș	30	13	4	13	57	51	+6	43	
9	Autoforesta Bocșa	30	13	3	14	69	50	+19	42	
10	Nera Bozovici	30	10	6	14	48	62	−14	36	
11	Minerul Rușchița	30	11	3	16	40	64	−24	36	
12	Minerul Mehadia	30	10	4	16	38	57	−19	34	
13	Minerul Dognecea	30	10	3	17	38	81	−43	33	
14	Bistra Glimboca	30	10	2	18	39	81	−42	32	
15	Avântul Anina	30	9	2	19	56	94	−38	29	
16	Turist Reșița	30	7	2	21	33	85	−52	23	

Rules for classification: 1) Points; 2) Goal difference; 3) Number of goals scored.
(C) Champions; (Q) Qualified for the phase indicated

=== Harghita County ===
Pos	Team	Pld	W	D	L	GF	GA	GD	Pts	Qualification or relegation
1	Tractorul Miercurea Ciuc (C, Q)	28	22	3	3	86	29	+57	47	Qualification to promotion play-off
2	Metalul Vlăhița	28	17	4	7	74	33	+41	38	
3	Harghita Miercurea Ciuc	28	16	5	7	55	28	+27	37	
4	Mureșul Suseni	28	14	6	8	68	40	+28	34	
5	Harghita Odorheiu Secuiesc	28	15	4	9	67	44	+23	34	
6	Mobila Ditrău	28	14	3	11	57	47	+10	31	
7	Avicola Cristuru Secuiesc	28	13	5	10	45	38	+7	31	
8	Făgetul Borsec	28	12	5	11	47	47	0	29	
9	Unirea Hodoșa	28	11	4	13	50	47	+3	26	
10	Constructorul Miercurea Ciuc	28	10	6	12	54	53	+1	26	
11	IPEG Harghita Tomești	28	11	4	13	46	58	−12	26	
12	Complexul Gălăuțaș	28	9	4	15	39	61	−22	22	
13	Viață Nouă Remetea	28	7	5	16	46	71	−25	19	
14	Șoimii Băile Tușnad (R)	28	7	3	18	35	99	−64	17	Relegation to Harghita County Championship II
15	Flamura Roșie Sânsimion (Note: Flamura Roșie Sânsimion was excluded from championship.) (R)	28	0	3	25	14	88	−74	3	Relegation to Harghita County Championship II

Rules for classification: 1) Points; 2) Goal difference; 3) Number of goals scored.
(C) Champions; (Q) Qualified for the phase indicated; (R) Relegated

=== Hunedoara County ===
Pos	Team	Pld	W	D	L	GF	GA	GD	Pts	Qualification or relegation
1	Minerul Ghelari (C, Q)	30	25	3	2	91	22	+69	53	Qualification to promotion play-off
2	Minerul Aninoasa	30	20	4	6	90	27	+63	44	
3	Preparatorul Petrila	30	15	8	7	68	36	+32	38	
4	Minerul Uricani	30	17	4	9	63	41	+22	38	
5	Minerul Teliuc	30	17	3	10	72	34	+38	37	
6	Parângul Lonea	30	15	7	8	64	33	+31	37	
7	Voința CLF Ilia	30	12	8	10	53	41	+12	32	
8	Utilajul Petroșani	30	14	4	12	62	52	+10	32	
9	Avântul Hațeg	30	14	2	14	55	44	+11	30	
10	Metalul Crișcior	30	13	4	13	52	70	−18	30	
11	Rapid Simeria Triaj	30	10	7	13	40	56	−16	27	
12	Constructorul Hunedoara	30	9	5	16	41	59	−18	23	
13	Măgura Minerul Pui	30	9	5	16	41	67	−26	23	
14	Minerul Bărbăteni	30	10	1	19	30	60	−30	21	
15	CFR Petroșani	30	5	3	22	32	88	−56	13	
16	Streiul Simeria Veche	30	1	0	29	8	132	−124	2	

Rules for classification: 1) Points; 2) Goal difference; 3) Number of goals scored.
(C) Champions; (Q) Qualified for the phase indicated

=== Maramureș County ===
Championship final

The championship final was played on 18 June 1986 at 23 August Stadium in Baia Mare.

Team 1	Score	Team 2
Unirea Seini	2–3	Minerul Baia Borșa

Minerul Baia Borșa won the Maramureș County Championship and qualify to promotion play-off in Divizia C.

=== Mureș County ===
Pos	Team	Pld	W	D	L	GF	GA	GD	Pts	Qualification or relegation
1	Metalul Reghin (C, Q)	26	16	5	5	57	19	+38	37	Qualification to promotion play-off
2	Valea Mureșului Gornești	26	13	8	5	45	27	+18	34	
3	Sticla Târnăveni	26	12	5	9	49	35	+14	29	
4	IRA Târgu Mureș	26	12	5	9	43	39	+4	29	
5	Voința Sângeorgiu de Pădure	26	9	8	9	33	33	0	26	
6	Avântul Târgu Mureș	26	9	7	10	34	34	0	25	
7	Voința Sărmașu	26	11	3	12	42	43	−1	25	
8	Voința Miercurea Nirajului	26	10	5	11	31	36	−5	25	
9	Faianța Sighișoara	26	8	9	9	33	39	−6	25	
10	Flamura Roșie Bogata	26	11	3	12	44	54	−10	25	
11	Voința Târnăveni	26	10	4	12	37	43	−6	24	
12	Viitorul Prodcomplex Târgu Mureș	26	8	7	11	31	45	−14	23	
13	Constructorul Târgu Mureș	26	9	4	13	40	43	−3	22	
14	Energia Iernut	26	5	5	16	21	50	−29	15	

Rules for classification: 1) Points; 2) Goal difference; 3) Number of goals scored.
(C) Champions; (Q) Qualified for the phase indicated

=== Neamț County ===
Pos	Team	Pld	W	D	L	GF	GA	GD	Pts	Qualification or relegation
1	Metalul IM Roman (C, Q)	26	20	3	3	67	20	+47	43	Qualification to promotion play-off
2	Cimentul Bicaz	26	19	1	6	68	21	+47	39	
3	IM Piatra Neamț	26	15	5	6	72	23	+49	35	
4	CPL Piatra Neamț	26	16	1	9	60	37	+23	31 (Note: CPL Piatra Neamț, Energia Săbăoani, Șoimii Piatra Șoimului, Viitorul Podoleni and Biruința Negrești deducted 2 points.)	
5	Energia Săbăoani	26	12	5	9	69	50	+19	27	
6	ITA Piatra Neamț	26	10	7	9	43	30	+13	27	
7	AZO-TCM Săvinești	26	12	2	12	42	49	−7	26	
8	Șoimii Piatra Șoimului	26	11	3	12	49	47	+2	23	
9	Vulturul Zănești	26	11	1	14	39	47	−8	23	
10	Voința Târgu Neamț	26	9	4	13	38	42	−4	22	
11	Voința Roman	26	9	2	15	49	44	+5	20	
12	Viitorul Podoleni	26	8	5	13	43	58	−15	19	
13	Unirea Trifești (R)	26	7	1	18	39	78	−39	15	Relegation to Neamț County Championship II
14	Biruința Negrești (R)	26	2	2	22	22	154	−132	4	Relegation to Neamț County Championship II

Rules for classification: 1) Points; 2) Goal difference; 3) Number of goals scored.
(C) Champions; (Q) Qualified for the phase indicated; (R) Relegated

=== Prahova County ===
Pos	Team	Pld	W	D	L	GF	GA	GD	Pts	Qualification or relegation
1	Sportul Muncitoresc Câmpina (C, Q)	36	28	3	5	61	21	+40	59	Qualification to promotion play-off
2	Caraimanul Bușteni	36	28	2	6	76	18	+58	58	
3	Neptun Câmpina	36	19	7	10	55	22	+33	45	
4	Chimistul Valea Călugărească	36	18	6	12	51	38	+13	42	
5	Geamul Scăieni	36	17	5	14	58	45	+13	39	
6	IUC Ploiești	36	14	8	14	45	45	0	36	
7	Metalul Filipeștii de Pădure	36	15	6	15	47	33	+14	36	
8	Precizia Breaza	36	15	4	17	53	50	+3	34	
9	Feroemail Ploiești	36	15	5	16	60	62	−2	35	
10	Oțelul Câmpina	36	13	8	15	53	35	+18	34	
11	Petrolistul Boldești	36	12	9	15	48	53	−5	33	
12	Progresul Ploiești	36	14	5	17	42	52	−10	33	
13	Avântul Măneciu	36	15	4	17	54	49	+5	34	
14	CSU Ploiești	36	13	6	17	47	50	−3	32	
15	Cristalul Azuga	36	11	10	15	42	47	−5	32	
16	Carotajul Ploiești	36	13	6	17	49	64	−15	32	
17	Unirea Teleajen Ploiești	36	11	10	15	29	47	−18	32	
18	Voința Vărbilău	36	12	5	19	37	74	−37	29	
19	Minerul Slănic (R)	36	4	1	31	20	122	−102	9	Relegation to Prahova County Championship II

Rules for classification: 1) Points; 2) Goal difference; 3) Number of goals scored.
(C) Champions; (Q) Qualified for the phase indicated; (R) Relegated

=== Sălaj County ===
Series I

Pos	Team	Pld	W	D	L	GF	GA	GD	Pts	Qualification or relegation
1	Rapid Jibou (Q)	30	22	6	2	113	21	+92	50	Qualification to championship final
2	Minerul Surduc	30	17	3	10	84	52	+32	37	
3	Integrata-Confecția Jibou	30	14	6	10	66	43	+23	34	
4	Progresul Bălan	30	16	2	12	66	69	−3	34	
5	Energia Sânmihaiu Almașului	30	15	2	13	63	58	+5	32	
6	SEIAMC Benesat (Note: SEIAMC Benesat replaced Recolta Agrij after 8 rounds and took over all its results.)	30	15	2	13	70	69	+1	32	
7	Victoria Românași	30	14	3	13	70	75	−5	31	
8	Olimpia Aluniș	30	13	3	14	49	64	−15	29	
9	Unirea Hida	30	12	4	14	70	69	+1	28	
10	Someșul Ileanda	30	12	3	15	67	66	+1	27	
11	Unirea Gârbou	30	12	3	15	65	72	−7	27	
12	Calmin Băbeni	30	12	2	16	60	86	−26	26	
13	Topitorul Someș-Odorhei	30	13	0	17	45	75	−30	26	
14	Luceafărul Năpradea	30	11	3	16	57	71	−14	25	
15	Speranța Sânpetru Almașului	30	11	3	16	61	77	−16	25	
16	Flacăra Rona	30	7	3	20	37	76	−39	17	

(Q) Qualified for the phase indicated
Notes:

Series II

Pos	Team	Pld	W	D	L	GF	GA	GD	Pts	Qualification or relegation
1	Silvania Cehu Silvaniei (Q)	30	27	2	1	134	26	+108	56	Qualification to championship final
2	Izolatorul Armătura Șimleu Silvaniei (Note: Izolatorul Armătura Șimleu Silvaniei started the championship as Gloria Armătura Șimleu Silvaniei, but was renamed before the start of the second part.)	30	19	3	8	109	37	+72	41	
3	Recolta Crișeni	30	18	4	8	87	63	+24	40	
4	Minerul Ip	30	18	3	9	69	35	+34	39	
5	Cetatea Valcău de Jos	30	19	1	10	71	62	+9	39	
6	Recolta Sălățig	30	15	1	14	63	61	+2	31	
7	Recolta Sighetu Silvaniei	30	13	5	12	52	55	−3	31	
8	Recolta Zăuan	30	12	5	13	51	70	−19	29	
9	Gloria Bobota	30	11	5	14	65	67	−2	27	
10	Recolta Sărmășag	30	11	3	16	75	75	0	25	
11	Voința Aghireș	30	11	3	16	54	69	−15	25	
12	Olimpic Bocșa	30	10	4	16	50	59	−9	24	
13	Minerul Chieșd	30	11	2	17	54	100	−46	24	
14	Avântul Lompirt	30	8	5	17	38	74	−36	21	
15	Voința Derșida	30	6	6	18	43	77	−34	18	
16	9 Mai Zalnoc	30	3	4	23	25	110	−85	10	

(Q) Qualified for the phase indicated
Notes:

Championship final

The match was played on 29 June 1986 at 23 August Stadium in Zalău.

Team 1	Score	Team 2
Silvania Cehu Silvaniei	3–2	Rapid Jibou

Silvania Cehu Silvaniei won the Sălaj County Championship and qualify to promotion play-off in Divizia C.

=== Sibiu County ===
Pos	Team	Pld	W	D	L	GF	GA	GD	Pts	Qualification or relegation
1	Automecanica Mediaș (C, Q)	30	22	6	2	72	17	+55	50	Qualification to promotion play-off
2	Record Mediaș	30	22	3	5	58	32	+26	47	
3	Textila Cisnădie	30	17	6	7	67	22	+45	40	
4	Carbomet Copșa Mică	30	16	5	9	55	34	+21	37	
5	Vitrometan Mediaș	30	15	6	9	52	30	+22	36	
6	Construcții Sibiu	30	15	6	9	43	29	+14	36	
7	Metalul IO Sibiu	30	15	4	11	57	39	+18	34	
8	Relee Mediaș	30	12	7	11	27	25	+2	31	
9	Firul Roșu Tălmaciu	30	11	9	10	41	46	−5	31	
10	CFR-IUPS Sibiu	30	10	3	17	47	62	−15	23	
11	Sparta Mediaș	30	7	9	14	23	42	−19	23	
12	Voința-Balanța Sibiu	30	9	5	16	35	54	−19	21 (Note: Voința-Balanța Sibiu deducted 2 points.)	
13	ITA-Geamuri Mediaș	30	7	6	17	30	45	−15	20	
14	Textila Mediaș	30	6	8	16	31	61	−30	20	
15	Progresul Dumbrăveni (Note: Progresul Dumbrăveni was spared from relegation due to the promotion of Automecanica Mediaș in Divizia C.)	30	5	5	20	25	77	−52	15	Spared from relegation
16	Cibinul Cristian (R)	30	6	2	22	30	78	−48	11 (Note: Cibinul Cristian deducted 3 points.)	Relegation to Sibiu County Championship II

Rules for classification: 1) Points; 2) Goal difference; 3) Number of goals scored.
(C) Champions; (Q) Qualified for the phase indicated; (R) Relegated

=== Suceava County ===
Series I

Pos	Team	Pld	W	D	L	GF	GA	GD	Pts	Qualification or relegation
1	Stimas Suceava (Q)	34	22	5	7	77	40	+37	49	Qualification to championship final
2	Filatura Fălticeni	34	21	4	9	84	44	+40	46	
3	Metalul IMU Suceava	34	19	5	10	74	59	+15	43	
4	Sportul Muncitoresc Pojorâta	34	20	1	13	91	72	+19	41	
5	Șoimii Preutești	34	17	3	14	67	52	+15	37	
6	Stejarul Cajvana	34	15	4	15	84	69	+15	34	
7	Bistrița Broșteni	34	14	7	13	60	68	−8	34 (Note: Bistrița Broșteni, Fuiorul Cornu Luncii, Foresta Moldovița, Foresta Râșca and Bradul Vama deducted 1 point.)	
8	Minerul Iacobeni	34	14	5	15	85	78	+7	33	
9	Minerul Crucea	34	14	4	16	64	49	+15	32	
10	Minerul Fundu Moldovei	34	14	3	17	62	71	−9	31	
11	Sportul Muncitoresc Suceava	34	12	6	16	61	73	−12	30	
12	Gloria Măzănăești	34	13	4	17	73	85	−12	30	
13	Victoria Păltinoasa	34	13	4	17	59	76	−17	30	
14	Forestierul Frumosu	34	13	4	17	63	90	−27	30	
15	Fuiorul Cornu Luncii	34	13	4	17	64	66	−2	29	
16	Foresta Moldovița	34	13	4	17	58	79	−21	29	
17	Foresta Râșca	34	14	1	19	55	66	−11	28	
18	Bradul Vama	34	9	4	21	39	83	−44	21	

(Q) Qualified for the phase indicated
Notes:

Series II

Pos	Team	Pld	W	D	L	GF	GA	GD	Pts	Qualification or relegation
1	Unirea Emil Bodnăraș (Q)	34	22	5	7	84	29	+55	49	Qualification to championship final
2	Locomotiva Dornești	34	18	4	12	79	47	+32	40	
3	Unirea Iacobești	34	19	2	13	74	62	+12	39 (Note: Unirea Iacobești, Avântul Todirești, Forestierul Falcău, Victoria Solca, Dumbrava Dumbrăveni, Constructorul Dărmănești and Avântul IPL Rădăuți deducted 1 point.)	
4	Viitorul Negostina	34	19	0	15	59	49	+10	38	
5	Recolta Fântânele	34	16	5	13	72	73	−1	37	
6	Viitorul Verești	34	17	3	14	57	60	−3	37	
7	Avântul Todirești	34	17	3	14	66	49	+17	36	
8	Bucovina Calafindești	34	16	4	14	81	84	−3	36	
9	Forestierul Falcău	34	17	1	16	59	50	+9	34	
10	Victoria Solca	34	16	3	15	71	71	0	34	
11	Metalul Putna	34	14	6	14	51	61	−10	34	
12	Dumbrava Dumbrăveni	34	13	6	15	54	57	−3	31	
13	Constructorul Dărmănești	34	15	2	17	60	85	−25	31	
14	Viitorul Arbore	34	14	2	18	60	70	−10	30	
15	Progresul Salcea	34	12	5	17	63	84	−21	29	
16	Unirea Horodnic	34	13	2	19	77	79	−2	28	
17	Avântul IPL Rădăuți	34	11	5	18	56	66	−10	26	
18	Hidrotehnica CNA Grămești	34	7	2	25	35	82	−47	16	

(Q) Qualified for the phase indicated
Notes:

Championship final

The championship final was played on 22 June 1986 at Tineretului Stadium in Câmpulung Moldovenesc.

Team 1	Score	Team 2
Unirea Emil Bodnăraș	0–0 (a.e.t.) (4–3 p)	Stimas Suceava

Unirea Emil Bodnăraș won the Suceava County Championship and qualify to promotion play-off in Divizia C.

== See also ==
- 1985–86 Divizia A
- 1985–86 Divizia B
- 1985–86 Divizia C
- 1985–86 Cupa României
