= 1985–86 Divizia B =

Divizia B
- Season: 1985–86
- Promoted: Oțelul Galați; Flacăra Moreni; Jiul Petroșani
- Relegated: Metalul Plopeni; Muscelul Câmpulung; CFR Timișoara; Dunărea Călărași; Avântul Reghin; Unirea Alba Iulia; Chimia Fălticeni; Șoimii IPA Sibiu; Înfrățirea Oradea; Minerul Vatra Dornei; ICSIM București; Minerul Lupeni

The 1985–86 Divizia B was the 46th season of the second tier of the Romanian football league system.

The format has been maintained to three series, each of them having 18 teams. At the end of the season the winners of the series promoted to Divizia A and the last four places from each series relegated to Divizia C.

== Team changes ==
=== To Divizia B ===
Promoted from Divizia C

- Minerul Vatra Dornei
- Aripile Bacău
- Delta Tulcea
- Dunărea Călărași
- ICSIM București
- Muscelul Câmpulung
- Electroputere Craiova
- Metalul Bocșa
- Înfrățirea Oradea
- CIL Sighetu Marmației
- Mecanica Orăștie
- ICIM Brașov

Relegated from Divizia A

- Jiul Petroșani
- Baia Mare
- Politehnica Iași

=== From Divizia B ===
Relegated to Divizia C

- FEPA 74 Bârlad
- Metalul București
- Metalurgistul Cugir
- Metalul Mangalia
- Unirea Alexandria
- Sticla Arieșul Turda
- Partizanul Bacău
- Autobuzul București
- Gloria Reșița
- Unirea Dinamo Focșani
- Minerul Motru
- IS Câmpia Turzii

Promoted to Divizia A

- Petrolul Ploiești
- Dinamo Victoria București
- Universitatea Cluj

=== Renamed teams ===
CSM Drobeta-Turnu Severin was renamed as AS Drobeta-Turnu Severin.

FC Baia Mare was renamed as FC Maramureș Baia Mare.

Flacăra-Automecanica Moreni was renamed as Flacăra Moreni.

IP Aluminiu Slatina was renamed as Sportul Muncitoresc Slatina.

== League tables ==
=== Serie I ===
Pos	Team	Pld	W	D	L	GF	GA	GD	Pts	Promotion or relegation
1	Oțelul Galați (C, P)	34	24	4	6	86	29	+57	52	Promotion to Divizia A
2	Politehnica Iași	34	17	5	12	48	42	+6	39	
3	Dunărea CSU Galați	34	16	5	13	47	44	+3	37	
4	FC Constanța	34	14	7	13	49	36	+13	35	
5	CSM Suceava	34	14	7	13	48	41	+7	35	
6	CFR Pașcani	34	14	7	13	48	43	+5	35	
7	Progresul Brăila	34	15	4	15	44	36	+8	34	
8	Steaua Mizil	34	15	4	15	45	42	+3	34	
9	CS Botoșani	34	15	4	15	41	43	−2	34	
10	Delta Tulcea	34	17	0	17	42	45	−3	34	
11	Ceahlăul Piatra Neamț	34	15	3	16	43	47	−4	33	
12	Olimpia Râmnicu Sărat	34	13	7	14	38	42	−4	33	
13	Prahova CSU Ploiești	34	14	5	15	43	50	−7	33	
14	Aripile Bacău	34	13	7	14	55	62	−7	33	
15	Metalul Plopeni (R)	34	14	4	16	57	46	+11	32	Relegation to Divizia C
16	Dunărea Călărași (R)	34	12	8	14	38	44	−6	32	Relegation to Divizia C
17	Chimia Fălticeni (R)	34	11	6	17	30	62	−32	28	Relegation to Divizia C
18	Minerul Vatra Dornei (R)	34	8	3	23	23	71	−48	19	Relegation to Divizia C

Source: romaniansoccer.ro (in Romanian)
Rules for classification: 1) Points; 2) Goal difference; 3) Goals scored; 4) Head-to-head points; 5) Head-to-head goal difference; 6) Head-to-head goals scored; 7) Head-to-head away goals scored.
(C) Champions; (P) Promoted; (R) Relegated

=== Serie II ===
Pos	Team	Pld	W	D	L	GF	GA	GD	Pts	Promotion or relegation
1	Flacăra Moreni (C, P)	34	20	8	6	46	25	+21	48	Promotion to Divizia A
2	Progresul Vulcan București	34	16	10	8	60	31	+29	42	
3	CS Târgoviște	34	17	8	9	53	26	+27	42	
4	ICIM Brașov	34	17	2	15	51	48	+3	36	
5	Gaz Metan Mediaș	34	16	3	15	46	35	+11	35	
6	Drobeta-Turnu Severin	34	15	5	14	43	42	+1	35	
7	Carpați Mârșa	34	16	3	15	56	56	0	35	
8	Electroputere Craiova	34	15	4	15	71	50	+21	34	
9	Chimica Târnăveni	34	15	4	15	51	53	−2	34	
10	Tractorul Brașov	34	13	7	14	42	38	+4	33	
11	Sportul Muncitoresc Slatina	34	12	9	13	34	39	−5	33	
12	Automatica București	34	14	5	15	43	53	−10	33	
13	IMASA Sfântu Gheorghe	34	13	7	14	42	52	−10	33	
14	MF Steaua București	34	12	7	15	49	51	−2	31	
15	Muscelul Câmpulung (R)	34	13	4	17	40	50	−10	30	Relegation to Divizia C
16	Avântul Reghin (R)	34	11	7	16	34	53	−19	29	Relegation to Divizia C
17	Șoimii IPA Sibiu (R)	34	9	9	16	43	53	−10	27	Relegation to Divizia C
18	ICSIM București (R)	34	8	6	20	27	76	−49	22	Relegation to Divizia C

Source: romaniansoccer.ro (in Romanian)
Rules for classification: 1) Points; 2) Goal difference; 3) Goals scored; 4) Head-to-head points; 5) Head-to-head goal difference; 6) Head-to-head goals scored; 7) Head-to-head away goals scored.
(C) Champions; (P) Promoted; (R) Relegated

=== Serie III ===
Pos	Team	Pld	W	D	L	GF	GA	GD	Pts	Promotion or relegation
1	Jiul Petroșani (C, P)	34	22	4	8	72	30	+42	48	Promotion to Divizia A
2	Maramureș Baia Mare	34	20	8	6	65	29	+36	48	
3	Gloria Bistrița	34	18	6	10	68	30	+38	42	
4	UTA Arad	34	17	2	15	49	44	+5	36	
5	Aurul Brad	34	16	3	15	41	41	0	35	
6	Olimpia Satu Mare	34	15	4	15	56	42	+14	34	
7	CIL Sighetu Marmației	34	15	4	15	39	46	−7	34	
8	CSM Reșița	34	13	7	14	45	40	+5	33	
9	Mureșul Deva	34	16	1	17	46	58	−12	33	
10	Armătura Zalău	34	14	5	15	41	58	−17	33	
11	Strungul Arad	34	13	6	15	56	54	+2	32	
12	Minerul Cavnic	34	15	2	17	51	50	+1	32	
13	Mecanica Orăștie	34	13	6	15	50	57	−7	32	
14	Metalul Bocșa	34	13	6	15	47	61	−14	32	
15	CFR Timișoara (R)	34	12	6	16	39	48	−9	30	Relegation to Divizia C
16	Unirea Alba Iulia (R)	34	14	2	18	47	66	−19	30	Relegation to Divizia C
17	Înfrățirea Oradea (R)	34	10	6	18	29	47	−18	26	Relegation to Divizia C
18	Minerul Lupeni (R)	34	8	6	20	25	65	−40	22	Relegation to Divizia C

Source: romaniansoccer.ro (in Romanian)
Rules for classification: 1) Points; 2) Goal difference; 3) Goals scored; 4) Head-to-head points; 5) Head-to-head goal difference; 6) Head-to-head goals scored; 7) Head-to-head away goals scored.
(C) Champions; (P) Promoted; (R) Relegated

== See also ==
- 1985–86 Divizia A
- 1985–86 Divizia C
- 1985–86 County Championship
- 1985–86 Cupa României
