= 1986–87 County Championship =

45th season of the Liga IV, the fourth tier of the Romanian football league

Liga IV
- Season: 1986–87

The 1986–87 County Championship was the 45th season of the Liga IV, the fourth tier of the Romanian football league system. The champions of each county association play against one from a neighboring county in a play-off to gain promotion to Divizia C.

== County championships ==
- Alba (AB)
- Arad (AR)
- Argeș (AG)
- Bacău (BC)
- Bihor (BH)
- Bistrița-Năsăud (BN)
- Botoșani (BT)
- Brașov (BV)
- Brăila (BR)
- Bucharest (B)
- Buzău (BZ)
- Caraș-Severin (CS)
- Călărași (CL)
- Cluj (CJ)
- Constanța (CT)
- Covasna (CV)
- Dâmbovița (DB)
- Dolj (DJ)
- Galați (GL)
- Giurgiu (GR)
- Gorj (GJ)
- Harghita (HR)
- Hunedoara (HD)
- Ialomița (IL)
- Iași (IS)
- Ilfov (IF)
- Maramureș (MM)
- Mehedinți (MH)
- Mureș (MS)
- Neamț (NT)
- Olt (OT)
- Prahova (PH)
- Satu Mare (SM)
- Sălaj (SJ)
- Sibiu (SB)
- Suceava (SV)
- Teleorman (TR)
- Timiș (TM)
- Tulcea (TL)
- Vaslui (VS)
- Vâlcea (VL)
- Vrancea (VN)

== Promotion play-off ==
Teams promoted to Divizia C without a play-off matches as teams from less represented counties in the third division.

- (MH) Celuloza Drobeta-Turnu Severin
- (SJ) Izomat Șimleu Silvaniei
- (BR) Progresul Brăila
- (VL) Dacia Metalul Râmnicu Vâlcea
- (IL) Victoria Munteni-Buzău
- (IS) Aurora Târgu Frumos
- (GR) Utilaje Grele Giurgiu

Preliminary round

Team 1	Agg.	Team 2	1st leg	2nd leg
IMGB București (B)	1–0	(IF) IAB Pantelimon	1–0	0–0

The matches was played on 12 and 19 July 1987.

Team 1	Agg.	Team 2	1st leg	2nd leg
Celuloza ITA Piatra Neamț (NT)	4–0	(BT) ASSAI Botoșani	2–0	2–0
Filatura Fălticeni (SV)	2–5	(MS) Lacul Ursu Sovata	1–3	1–2
Mecon Gheorghe Gheorghiu-Dej (BC)	1–0	(BV) Chimia Victoria	1–0	0–0
Avântul Liești (GL)	1–5	(VS) Moldosin Vaslui	1–0	0–5
Săgeata Stejaru (TL)	4–8	(CT) Conpref Constanța	2–2	2–6
Autobuzul Laminorul Focșani (VN)	1–5	(BZ) ASA Buzău	1–2	0–3
Montana Sinaia (PH)	5–0	(CL) Oțelul Roșu Călărași	3–0	2–0
Laminorul Zimnicea (TR)	1–5	(B) IMGB București	1–1	0–4
Petrolul Târgoviște (DB)	10–1	(OT) Sporting Slatina	5–0	5–1
Edilul IJGCL Pitești (AG)	3–2	(DJ) ASA Craiova	0–1	3–1
Jiul ACH Târgu Jiu (GJ)	2–5	(CS) Automecanica Reșița	1–2	1–3
Minerul Uricani (HD)	0–3	(TM) Auto Timișoara	0–2	0–1
Textila Cisnădie (SB)	5–0	(AB) Surianul Sebeș	1–0	4–0
Cuprom Baia Mare (MM)	5–2	(SM) Someșul Odoreu	2–1	3–1
Motorul IMA Arad (AR)	4–1	(BH) Voința Oradea	3–0	1–1
CM Cluj-Napoca (CJ)	1–2	(BN) Hebe Sângeorz-Băi	1–0	0–2
Mureșul Topiița (HR)	2–3	(CV) Carpați Covasna	1–0	1–3

== Championships standings ==
=== Arad County ===
Pos	Team	Pld	W	D	L	GF	GA	GD	Pts	Qualification or relegation
1	Motorul IMA Arad (C, Q)	34	26	3	5	78	18	+60	55	Qualification to promotion play-off
2	CFR Arad	34	19	5	10	71	34	+37	43	
3	Progresul Pecica	34	20	3	11	62	31	+31	43	
4	Unirea Ineu	34	18	6	10	57	42	+15	42	
5	Mureșul Zădăreni	34	18	4	12	82	48	+34	40	
6	Victoria Ineu	34	17	4	13	61	40	+21	38	
7	Foresta Sânpetru German	34	16	2	16	66	63	+3	34	
8	Olimpia Pădureni	34	14	6	14	47	50	−3	34	
9	Unirea Șofronea	34	13	6	15	52	53	−1	32	
10	Agronomia Șagu	34	14	4	16	48	71	−23	32	
11	Voința Felnac	34	14	2	18	51	59	−8	30	
12	Victoria Ceasuri Arad	34	12	6	16	45	67	−22	30	
13	Olimpia ISD Arad	34	14	2	18	44	68	−24	30	
14	Explormin Hălmagiu	34	13	3	18	60	48	+12	29	
15	Tricoul Roșu Arad	34	14	1	19	51	72	−21	29	
16	Șoimii Pâncota	34	13	2	19	39	69	−30	28	
17	Gloria Ineu	34	8	8	18	41	66	−25	24	
18	Voința Macea	34	7	5	22	40	96	−56	19	

Rules for classification: 1) Points; 2) Goal difference; 3) Number of goals scored.
(C) Champions; (Q) Qualified for the phase indicated

=== Bucharest ===
The ranking combined points of the senior (3 points for a win) and junior (2 points for a win) teams.

Pos	Team	Pld	W	D	L	GF	GA	GD	Pts	Qualification or relegation
1	IMGB București (C, Q)	68	46	12	10	174	53	+121	128	Qualification to promotion play-off
2	Calculatorul București	68	37	13	18	104	63	+41	103	
3	ICME București	68	36	16	16	112	56	+56	102	
4	Mecos București	68	35	17	16	109	71	+38	98	
5	URBIS București	68	30	19	19	94	60	+34	90	
6	Mașini Unelte București	68	27	18	23	91	73	+18	83	
7	Laromet București	68	26	13	29	95	103	−8	78	
8	Granitul București	68	24	13	31	70	92	−22	78	
9	Vulcan București	68	25	14	29	90	113	−23	78	
10	Gloria București	68	25	13	30	88	93	−5	76	
11	Automecanica București	68	23	14	31	80	92	−12	76	
12	Electroaparataj București	68	23	16	29	93	88	+5	75	
13	Aversa București	68	25	14	29	88	94	−6	75	
14	Flacăra Roșie București	68	22	20	26	87	95	−8	75	
15	Electra București	68	24	11	13	89	128	−39	73	
16	Electromagnetica București	68	24	10	34	75	119	−44	70	
17	Ascensorul București	68	19	12	37	67	111	−44	59	
18	Chimistul București	68	12	13	43	45	149	−104	46	

Rules for classification: 1) Points; 2) Goal difference; 3) Number of goals scored.
(C) Champion; (Q) Qualified for the phase indicated

=== Botoșani County ===
Pos	Team	Pld	W	D	L	GF	GA	GD	Pts	Qualification or relegation
1	ASSAI Botoșani (C, Q)	28	24	2	2	79	15	+64	50	Qualification to promotion play-off
2	Sănătatea Darabani	28	22	2	4	70	22	+48	46	
3	Ceramica Dorohoi	28	21	0	7	81	24	+57	41 (Note: Ceramica Dorohoi, Viitorul Dersca, Avântul Albești, Spicul Iacobeni and Flacăra Flămânzi deducted 1 point.)	
4	Viitorul Dersca	28	19	1	8	74	58	+16	38	
5	Victoria Săveni	28	18	0	10	88	39	+49	36	
6	Voința Șendriceni	28	14	1	13	69	76	−7	29	
7	Avântul Albești	28	12	3	13	48	47	+1	26	
8	Avântul Mihai Eminescu	28	13	0	15	68	73	−5	26	
9	Spicul Iacobeni	28	12	2	14	58	61	−3	25	
10	Unirea Stăuceni	28	12	1	15	61	73	−12	25	
11	Sportivul Trușești	28	10	1	17	55	68	−13	21	
12	Flacăra Flămânzi	28	10	2	16	43	60	−17	21	
13	Speranța Dumbrăvița	28	7	1	20	50	89	−39	15	
14	Acumularea Rogojești	28	5	2	21	31	82	−51	10 (Note: Acumularea Rogojești and Zorile Vorniceni deducted 2 points.)	
15	Zorile Vorniceni	28	2	0	26	20	108	−88	2	
16	Textila Botoșani (Note: Textila Botoșani withdrew from the championship and all their results were canceled.)	0	0	0	0	0	0	0	0	Withdrew

Rules for classification: 1) Points; 2) Goal difference; 3) Number of goals scored.
(C) Champions; (Q) Qualified for the phase indicated

=== Caraș-Severin County ===
Pos	Team	Pld	W	D	L	GF	GA	GD	Pts	Qualification or relegation
1	Automecanica Reșița (C, Q)	34	25	5	4	87	26	+61	80	Qualification to promotion play-off
2	Hercules ACH Băile Herculane	34	24	4	6	89	38	+51	76	
3	Muncitorul Știința Reșița	34	18	6	10	62	36	+26	60	
4	Metalul Topleț	34	19	2	13	80	41	+39	59	
5	Metalul Reșița	34	17	6	11	86	56	+30	57	
6	Energia Caransebeș	34	18	3	13	59	49	+10	57	
7	Minerul Ocna de Fier	34	15	6	13	58	50	+8	51	
8	Nera Bozovici	34	15	2	17	66	68	−2	49 (Note: Nera Bozovici deducted 2 points.)	
9	Foresta Caransebeș	34	14	4	16	46	46	0	46	
10	Unirea Grădinari	34	13	5	16	65	82	−17	44	
11	Minerul Rușchița	34	13	3	18	43	63	−20	42	
12	Foresta Zăvoi	34	13	2	19	49	62	−13	41	
13	Minerul Dognecea	34	13	1	20	41	77	−36	40	
14	Bistra Glimboca	34	12	3	19	48	81	−33	39	
15	Avântul Anina	34	12	2	20	59	71	−12	38	
16	Autoforesta Bocșa	34	11	4	19	42	58	−16	37	
17	Minerul Mehadia	34	11	4	19	51	100	−49	37	
18	Voința Reșița	34	10	4	20	41	74	−33	34	

Rules for classification: 1) Points; 2) Goal difference; 3) Number of goals scored.
(C) Champions; (Q) Qualified for the phase indicated

=== Covasna County ===
Pos	Team	Pld	W	D	L	GF	GA	GD	Pts	Qualification or relegation
1	Carpați Covasna (C, Q)	30	20	9	1	88	35	+53	79	Qualification to promotion play-off
2	Avântul Catalina	30	16	7	7	76	44	+32	69	
3	Perkő Sânzieni	30	16	6	8	62	30	+32	68	
4	Stăruința Bodoc	30	15	4	11	69	50	+19	64	
5	Diatomita Filia	30	14	4	12	54	40	+14	62	
6	Progresul Brateș	30	11	8	11	49	66	−17	60	
7	Harghita Aita Mare	30	11	7	12	64	55	+9	59	
8	Victoria Ozun	30	13	3	14	55	74	−19	59	
9	Minerul Sfântu Gheorghe	30	11	6	13	56	57	−1	58	
10	Spartacus Hăghig	30	12	4	14	50	66	−16	58	
11	Unirea Reci	30	10	7	13	49	55	−6	57	
12	Constructorul Sfântu Gheorghe	30	12	3	15	42	52	−10	57	
13	Stăruința Zagon	30	11	4	15	74	69	+5	56	
14	Recolta Moacșa	30	10	4	16	44	86	−42	54	
15	Nemere Poian (R)	30	9	5	16	44	69	−25	53	Relegation to Covasna County Championship II
16	Agricultorul Angheluș (R)	30	6	5	19	40	67	−27	43 (Note: Agricultorul Angheluș deducted 4 points.)	Relegation to Covasna County Championship II

Rules for classification: 1) Points; 2) Goal difference; 3) Number of goals scored.
(C) Champions; (Q) Qualified for the phase indicated; (R) Relegated

=== Harghita County ===
Pos	Team	Pld	W	D	L	GF	GA	GD	Pts	Qualification or relegation
1	Mureșul Toplița (C, Q)	28	24	2	2	105	16	+89	50	Qualification to promotion play-off
2	Rapid Miercurea Ciuc	28	20	4	4	77	16	+61	44	
3	Metalul Vlăhița	28	20	3	5	98	38	+60	43	
4	Mureșul Suseni	28	18	3	7	70	22	+48	39	
5	Tractorul Miercurea Ciuc	28	18	3	7	58	29	+29	39	
6	Avicola Cristuru Secuiesc	28	12	3	13	51	35	+16	27	
7	Mobila Ditrău	28	11	1	16	54	59	−5	23	
8	Unirea Hodoșa	28	10	2	16	50	75	−25	22	
9	Complexul Gălăuțaș	28	9	4	15	38	71	−33	22	
10	IPEG Harghita Tomești	28	9	3	16	48	72	−24	21	
11	Constructorul Miercurea Ciuc	28	9	3	16	36	62	−26	21	
12	Bastionul Lăzarea	28	9	3	16	34	67	−33	21	
13	Viață Nouă Remetea	28	9	3	16	40	82	−42	21	
14	Făgetul Borsec	28	7	3	18	26	51	−25	17	
15	Forestierul Lunca de Jos	28	4	2	22	31	121	−90	10	

Rules for classification: 1) Points; 2) Goal difference; 3) Number of goals scored.
(C) Champions; (Q) Qualified for the phase indicated

=== Hunedoara County ===
Pos	Team	Pld	W	D	L	GF	GA	GD	Pts	Qualification or relegation
1	Minerul Uricani (C, Q)	30	26	2	2	92	19	+73	54	Qualification to promotion play-off
2	Minerul Certej	30	24	3	3	87	18	+69	51	
3	Avântul Hațeg	30	21	2	7	66	33	+33	44	
4	Minerul Teliuc	30	17	5	8	75	29	+46	39	
5	Minerul Aninoasa	30	17	4	9	74	32	+42	37 (Note: Minerul Aninoasa, Utilajul Petroșani, Parângul Lonea, CFR Petroșani, Măgura Minerul Pui and Auto RMR Brazi deducted 1 point.)	
6	Inox Hunedoara	30	16	4	10	44	36	+8	36	
7	Voința CLF Ilia	30	14	4	12	61	57	+4	32	
8	Utilajul Petroșani	30	13	6	11	62	43	+19	31	
9	Parângul Lonea	30	14	4	12	56	49	+7	31	
10	Constructorul Hunedoara	30	14	2	14	62	67	−5	30	
11	Metalul Crișcior	30	13	2	15	53	52	+1	28	
12	Rapid Simeria Triaj	30	9	6	15	42	62	−20	20 (Note: Rapid Simeria Triaj deducted 4 points.)	
13	CFR Petroșani	30	6	2	22	30	80	−50	13	
14	Măgura Minerul Pui	30	5	2	23	35	94	−59	11	
15	Jiul Petroșani II	30	2	5	23	19	80	−61	7 (Note: Jiul Petroșani II deducted 2 points.)	
16	Auto RMR Brazi	30	0	1	29	19	129	−110	0	

Rules for classification: 1) Points; 2) Goal difference; 3) Number of goals scored.
(C) Champions; (Q) Qualified for the phase indicated

=== Maramureș County ===
North Series

Pos	Team	Pld	W	D	L	GF	GA	GD	Pts	Qualification or relegation
1	IS Sighetu Marmației (Q)	22	17	3	2	82	15	+67	37	Qualification to championship final
2	Voința Ocna Șugatag	22	16	4	2	67	26	+41	36	
3	Maramureșana Sighetu Marmației	22	14	1	7	51	32	+19	29	
4	Metalul Bogdan Vodă	22	11	1	10	52	43	+9	23	
5	AEI Sighetu Marmației	22	11	1	10	50	52	−2	23	
6	Avântul Bârsana	22	10	3	9	35	39	−4	23	
7	Voința Poienile de sub Munte	22	8	3	11	47	60	−13	19	
8	Zorile Moisei	22	8	2	12	43	54	−11	18	
9	Recolta Rozavlea	22	7	2	13	31	48	−17	16	
10	Iza Dragomirești	22	7	1	14	28	61	−33	15	
11	Tisa Sarasău	22	5	3	14	29	55	−26	13	
12	Forestiera Câmpulung la Tisa	22	5	2	15	26	56	−30	12	

(Q) Qualified for the phase indicated

South Series

Pos	Team	Pld	W	D	L	GF	GA	GD	Pts	Qualification or relegation
1	Cuprom Baia Mare (Q)	22	20	0	2	103	16	+87	40	Qualification to championship final
2	Unirea Seini	22	19	2	1	92	13	+79	40	
3	Voința Târgu Lăpuș	22	11	5	6	50	29	+21	27	
4	Tractorul Satulung	22	10	6	6	50	34	+16	26	
5	Stăruința Recea	22	11	3	8	48	36	+12	25	
6	Sticla Ulmeni	22	12	1	9	43	43	0	25	
7	Progresul Șomcuta Mare	22	10	3	9	50	54	−4	23	
8	Electrica Baia Mare	22	6	3	13	30	57	−27	15	
9	Someșul Cicârlău	22	5	3	14	27	58	−31	13	
10	Victoria FNC Baia Mare	22	5	3	14	33	80	−47	13	
11	Unirea Săsar	22	3	4	15	32	87	−55	10	
12	Prefabricate Mireșu Mare	22	3	1	18	26	77	−51	7	

(Q) Qualified for the phase indicated

Championship final

The championship final was played on 11 June 1987 at 23 August Stadium in Baia Mare.

Team 1	Score	Team 2
Cuprom Baia Mare	2–0	IS Sighetu Marmației

Cuprom Baia Mare won the Maramureș County Championship and qualify to promotion play-off in Divizia C.

=== Mureș County ===
Pos	Team	Pld	W	D	L	GF	GA	GD	Pts	Qualification or relegation
1	Lacul Ursu Sovata (C, Q)	30	22	3	5	82	26	+56	47	Qualification to promotion play-off
2	IRA Târgu Mureș	30	19	4	7	84	31	+53	42	
3	Sticla Târnăveni	30	17	5	8	56	31	+25	39	
4	IMATEX Târgu Mureș	30	13	7	10	39	36	+3	33	
5	Faianța Sighișoara	30	15	2	13	42	43	−1	32	
6	Viitorul Prodcomplex Târgu Mureș	30	11	8	11	41	35	+6	30	
7	Voința Sângeorgiu de Pădure	30	14	2	14	33	40	−7	30	
8	Avântul Târgu Mureș	30	11	6	13	51	42	+9	28	
9	Voința Miercurea Nirajului	30	11	6	13	34	54	−20	28	
10	Voința Sărmașu	30	12	3	15	39	56	−17	27	
11	Voința Târnăveni	30	11	4	15	49	51	−2	26	
12	Energia Iernut	30	11	4	15	43	53	−10	26	
13	TCMRIC Târgu Mureș	29	8	9	12	43	48	−5	25	
14	Flamura Roșie Bogata	29	10	4	15	43	87	−44	24	
15	Constructorul Târgu Mureș	30	9	5	16	38	52	−14	23	
16	Valea Mureșului Gornești	30	7	4	19	28	60	−32	18	

Rules for classification: 1) Points; 2) Goal difference; 3) Number of goals scored.
(C) Champions; (Q) Qualified for the phase indicated

=== Neamț County ===
Pos	Team	Pld	W	D	L	GF	GA	GD	Pts	Qualification or relegation
1	Celuloza ITA Piatra Neamț (C, Q)	26	17	7	2	65	13	+52	41	Qualification to promotion play-off
2	Voința Roman	26	16	2	8	55	27	+28	34	
3	Rapid Piatra Neamț	26	12	6	8	34	32	+2	30	
4	Energia Săbăoani	26	11	6	9	56	36	+20	28	
5	Viitorul Podoleni	26	12	4	10	39	47	−8	28	
6	Voința Târgu Neamț	26	9	9	8	38	29	+9	27	
7	Cimentul Bicaz	26	11	5	10	38	33	+5	27	
8	Danubiana Roman	26	8	8	10	39	42	−3	24	
9	IM Piatra Neamț	26	9	5	12	34	45	−11	23	
10	AZO-TCM Săvinești	26	8	7	11	32	50	−18	23	
11	Spicul Tămășeni	26	8	6	12	37	53	−16	22	
12	Șoimii Piatra Șoimului	26	8	6	12	26	46	−20	22	
13	Bradul Roznov	26	8	5	13	41	47	−6	21	
14	CPL Piatra Neamț	26	5	4	17	25	59	−34	14	

Rules for classification: 1) Points; 2) Goal difference; 3) Number of goals scored.
(C) Champions; (Q) Qualified for the phase indicated

=== Prahova County ===
Pos	Team	Pld	W	D	L	GF	GA	GD	Pts	Qualification or relegation
1	Montana Sinaia (C, Q)	34	21	12	1	61	16	+45	54	Qualification to promotion play-off
2	Metalul Filipeștii de Pădure	34	23	7	4	67	14	+53	53	
3	Chimistul Valea Călugărească	34	22	8	4	70	22	+48	52	
4	Viitorul Pleașa	34	16	5	13	43	53	−10	37	
5	Oțelul Câmpina	34	12	12	10	44	36	+8	36	
6	Avântul Măneciu	34	14	9	11	53	34	+19	35 (Note: Avântul Măneciu and Voința Vărbilău deducted 2 points.)	
7	Petrolistul Boldești	34	13	7	14	45	45	0	33	
8	IUC Ploiești	34	12	9	13	42	46	−4	33	
9	Caraimanul Bușteni	34	12	9	13	41	40	+1	32 (Note: Caraimanul Bușteni deducted 1 point.)	
10	Geamul Scăieni	34	11	10	13	41	42	−1	32	
11	Metalul CSU Vălenii de Munte	34	11	9	14	36	54	−18	31	
12	Progresul Ploiești	34	11	8	15	35	34	+1	30	
13	Precizia Breaza	34	11	8	15	38	44	−6	30	
14	Unirea Teleajen Ploiești	34	10	10	14	34	48	−14	30	
15	Carotajul Ploiești	34	11	8	15	43	58	−15	30	
16	Feroemail Ploiești	34	11	7	16	46	51	−5	29	
17	Cristalul Azuga	34	10	9	15	34	49	−15	29	
18	Voința Vărbilău (R)	34	0	3	31	15	102	−87	1	Relegation to Prahova County Championship II

Rules for classification: 1) Points; 2) Goal difference; 3) Number of goals scored.
(C) Champions; (Q) Qualified for the phase indicated; (R) Relegated

=== Sălaj County ===
Pos	Team	Pld	W	D	L	GF	GA	GD	Pts	Qualification or relegation
1	Izomat Șimleu Silvaniei (C, Q)	22	16	6	0	92	24	+68	38	Qualification to promotion play-off
2	Rapid Jibou	22	15	3	4	76	23	+53	33	
3	Minerul Surduc	22	10	3	9	43	40	+3	23	
4	Cetatea Valcău de Jos	22	10	3	9	43	54	−11	23	
5	SEIAMC Benesat	22	10	2	10	41	26	+15	22	
6	Minerul Ip	22	10	2	10	42	42	0	22	
7	Olimpic Bocșa	22	10	2	10	38	43	−5	22	
8	Recolta Zăuan	22	6	7	9	37	52	−15	19	
9	Voința Aghireș	22	7	3	12	43	60	−17	17	
10	Progresul Bălan	22	6	5	11	37	56	−19	17	
11	Recolta Crișeni	22	6	4	12	32	61	−29	16	
12	Energia Sânmihaiu Almașului	22	3	6	13	26	69	−43	12	

Rules for classification: 1) Points; 2) Goal difference; 3) Number of goals scored.
(C) Champions; (Q) Qualified for the phase indicated

=== Sibiu County ===
Pos	Team	Pld	W	D	L	GF	GA	GD	Pts	Qualification or relegation
1	Textila Cisnădie (C, Q)	30	24	2	4	69	15	+54	50	Qualification to promotion play-off
2	Metalul IO Sibiu	30	22	5	3	62	14	+48	49	
3	Carbomet Copșa Mică	30	18	4	8	78	37	+41	40	
4	Voința-Balanța Sibiu	30	14	8	8	54	38	+16	36	
5	Record Mediaș	30	13	4	13	49	36	+13	30	
6	Relee Mediaș	30	11	8	11	37	36	+1	30	
7	Construcții Sibiu	30	9	11	10	37	32	+5	29	
8	Vitrometan Mediaș	30	11	9	10	42	41	+1	29 (Note: Vitrometan Mediaș deducted 2 points.)	
9	Sparta Mediaș	30	9	10	11	36	42	−6	28	
10	CFR-IUPS Sibiu	30	12	3	15	43	47	−4	27	
11	ITA-Geamuri Mediaș	30	10	7	13	30	38	−8	27	
12	Textila Mediaș	30	11	5	14	38	50	−12	27	
13	Firul Roșu Tălmaciu	30	11	3	16	48	46	+2	25	
14	Tractorul Sibiu	30	10	5	15	35	59	−24	25	
15	Bradul Ardelean (R)	30	4	5	21	28	106	−78	13	Relegation to Sibiu County Championship II
16	Progresul Dumbrăveni (R)	30	3	7	20	18	67	−49	10 (Note: Progresul Dumbrăveni deducted 3 points.)	Relegation to Sibiu County Championship II

Rules for classification: 1) Points; 2) Goal difference; 3) Number of goals scored.
(C) Champions; (Q) Qualified for the phase indicated; (R) Relegated

=== Suceava County ===
Pos	Team	Pld	W	D	L	GF	GA	GD	Pts	Qualification or relegation
1	Filatura Fălticeni (C, Q)	30	21	4	5	100	18	+82	46	Qualification to promotion play-off
2	Sportul Muncitoresc Metalul Suceava	30	21	4	5	96	23	+73	46	
3	Stimas Suceava	30	16	7	7	55	25	+30	36 (Note: Stimas Suceava deducted 3 points.)	
4	Minerul Crucea	30	15	3	12	49	42	+7	33	
5	Unirea Emil Bodnăraș	30	16	2	12	65	53	+12	32 (Note: Unirea Emil Bodnăraș deducted 2 points)	
6	Stejarul Cajvana	30	14	4	12	61	50	+11	31 (Note: Stejarul Cajvana, Minerul Iacobeni and Recolta Fântânele deducted 1 point.)	
7	Șoimii Preutești	30	11	6	13	63	49	+14	28	
8	Locomotiva Dornești	30	12	3	15	41	60	−19	27	
9	Minerul Iacobeni	30	11	6	13	39	65	−26	27	
10	Recolta Fântânele	30	11	5	14	62	64	−2	26	
11	Avântul Todirești	30	10	6	14	36	54	−18	26	
12	Bucovina Calafindești	30	9	8	13	51	73	−22	26	
13	Victoria Solca	30	13	0	17	57	81	−24	26	
14	Minerul Fundu Moldovei	30	12	1	17	49	62	−13	25	
15	Sportul Muncitoresc Pojorâta	30	9	1	20	40	98	−58	19	
16	Viitorul Negostina	30	8	2	20	26	73	−47	18	

Rules for classification: 1) Points; 2) Goal difference; 3) Number of goals scored.
(C) Champions; (Q) Qualified for the phase indicated

== See also ==
- 1986–87 Divizia A
- 1986–87 Divizia B
- 1986–87 Cupa României
