= CSO Viitorul Darabani =

Romanian football club

Viitorul Darabani
- Full name: Clubul Sportiv Orășenesc Viitorul Darabani
- Nicknames: Dărăbănenii (The People from Darabani)
- Short name: Darabani
- Founded: 1968; 58 years ago as Sănătatea Darabani; 2019; 7 years ago as Sporting Darabani
- Ground: Chirică Pușcașu
- Capacity: 1,000
- Owner: Darabani Town
- Chairman: Dan Dănilă
- Manager: Radu Cașuba
- League: Liga V
- 2025–26: Liga V, Seria Nord, 2nd
Home colours	Away colours

Clubul Sportiv Orășenesc Viitorul Darabani, commonly known as Viitorul Darabani, is a Romanian professional football club based in Darabani, Botoșani County. The club last competed in the 2022–23 Liga III season before being excluded for two no-shows.

The club has evolved throughout its existence under the names of Sănătatea Darabani, Recolta Darabani, CS Darabani and Sporting Darabani. The current name was adopted in the summer of 2022 after the club won the promotion to Liga III.

== History ==
The team from the northernmost town of the country was founded in 1968 as Sănătatea Darabani and played mostly in the Botoșani County Championship.

Sănătatea won the County Championship in the 1981–82 season, losing the promotion to third division in front of Zimbrul Suceava, the winner of Suceava County Championship.

In the 2016–17 season, under the leadership of Radu Cașuba, Sănătatea promoted for the first time in third division winning the Liga IV – Botoșani County and the promotion play-off against Viitorul Curița, the winner of Liga IV – Bacău County (1–0 at home and 4–3 away).

In the first season in Liga III, Sănătatea avoided relegation from 12th place, but went down after finished 15th in the 2018–19 season, relegated after two years in the third division.

After the relegation, the club was reorganized in the fifth league as Sporting Darabani being in the 7th place of the North Series when the league was suspended in March 2020 due to the COVID-19 pandemic.

Sporting Darabani won the Liga IV – Botoșani County in 2021–22 season, then obtain a 6–4 victory on aggregate against Flacăra Erbiceni, the winner of Liga IV – Iași County in the promotion play-off, promoted to Liga III.

== Honours ==
Liga IV – Botoșani County

- Winners (3): 1981–82, 2016–17, 2021–22
- Runners-up (3): 1970–71, 1986–87, 1991–92

Cupa României – Botoșani County

- Winners (2): 2006–07, 2021–22

== League history ==
Season	Tier	Division	Place	Notes	Cupa României
2023–24	3	Liga III (Seria I)	10th	Withdrew	First round
2022–23	3	Liga III (Seria I)	8th		Second round

Season	Tier	Division	Place	Notes	Cupa României
2021–22	4	Liga IV (BT)	1st (C)	Promoted	County phase
