= 1976–77 Divizia C =

Third tier Romanian football league

Divizia C
- Season: 1976–77

The 1976–77 Divizia C was the 21st season of Liga III, the third tier of the Romanian football league system.

The format was maintained with twelve series, each consisting of 16 teams. At the end of the season, the winner of each series was promoted to Divizia B, while the bottom two teams from each series were relegated to the County Championships.

== Team changes ==
=== To Divizia C ===
Relegated from Divizia B

- CS Botoșani
- Minerul Motru
- Minerul Moldova Nouă
- Cimentul Medgidia
- Metalul Mija
- Gaz Metan Mediaș
- Viitorul Vaslui
- Metrom Brașov
- Victoria Carei
- Tulcea
- Autobuzul București
- Unirea Tomnatic

Promoted from County Championship

- ITA Piatra Neamț
- Partizanul Bacău
- Nicolina Iași
- Dinamo Focșani
- Recolta Săhăteni
- Metalosport Galați
- Victoria Țăndărei
- Șantierul Naval Constanța
- Abatorul București
- Viitorul Chirnogi
- Progresul Pucioasa
- Dacia Pitești
- Petrolul Videle
- Laminorul IPA Slatina
- Laminorul Nădrag
- Nera Bozovici
- Victoria Zalău
- Oțelul Bihor
- Mureșul Luduș
- Lăpușul Târgu Lăpuș
- Mureșul Toplița
- Măgura Codlea
- FIL Orăștie
- Automecanica Mediaș

=== From Divizia C ===
Promoted to Divizia B

- Minerul Gura Humorului
- Relonul Săvinești
- Olimpia Râmnicu Sărat
- Portul Constanța
- Tehnometal București
- Flacăra-Automecanica Moreni
- Minerul Lupeni
- Aurul Brad
- Armătura Zalău
- Minerul Cavnic
- Chimica Târnăveni
- Oltul Sfântu Gheorghe

Relegated to County Championship

- ~~Foresta Moldovița~~
- ~~Metalurgistul Iași~~
- Locomotiva Adjud
- Tractorul Văleni
- Petrolul Berca
- Carpați Nehoiu
- Granitul Babadag
- Voința Constanța
- IPRECA Călărași
- Rapid Fetești
- Electrica Titu
- Voința Caracal
- Victoria Craiova
- ~~Unirea Drobeta-Turnu Severin~~
- CFR Caransebeș
- Minerul Oravița
- Rapid Jibou
- Constructorul Satu Mare
- CM Cluj-Napoca
- Progresul Năsăud
- Vitrometan Mediaș
- Lacul Ursu Sovata
- Miercurea Ciuc
- Metalul Târgu Secuiesc

=== Renamed teams ===
Metalurgistul Iași was renamed Tepro Iași.

Chimia Brăila was renamed Unirea Tricolor Brăila.

Viitorul Brăila was renamed Dacia Unirea Brăila.

Gloria Murfatlar was renamed Gloria Poarta Albă.

Triumf București was renamed Automecanica București.

FOB Balș was renamed IOB Balș.

Cimentul Victoria Târgu Jiu was renamed Pandurii Târgu Jiu.

Dinamo Orșova was renamed Dierna Orșova.

Constructorul Timișoara was renamed Banatul Timișoara.

UPA Sibiu was renamed IPA Sibiu.

Minerul Teliuc was renamed Laminorul Teliuc.

=== Other changes ===
Vulturii Muscelului Câmpulung merged with ARO Câmpulung, with the former being absorbed by the latter, and the club was renamed Muscelul Câmpulung.

Meva Drobeta-Turnu Severin and Metalul Drobeta-Turnu Severin merged, with the former being absorbed by the latter. After the merger, the club was renamed CSM Drobeta-Turnu Severin.

Unirea Drobeta-Turnu Severin was spared from relegation due to the merger of Meva Drobeta-Turnu Severin and Metalul Drobeta-Turnu Severin.

Dinamo MIU Oradea merged with Înfrățirea Oradea, with the former being absorbed by the latter.

Metalul Botoșani took the place of Constructorul Botoșani.

Spicul Țigănași and Victoria Roman withdrew.

Foresta Moldovița and Metalurgistul Iași were spared from relegation.

== League tables ==
=== Seria I ===
Pos	Team	Pld	W	D	L	GF	GA	GD	Pts	Promotion or relegation
1	CS Botoșani (C, P)	30	20	5	5	78	20	+58	45	Promotion to Divizia B
2	Laminorul Roman	30	19	5	6	44	26	+18	43	
3	Foresta Fălticeni	30	15	4	11	43	27	+16	34	
4	Avântul Frasin	30	15	4	11	50	38	+12	34	
5	Metalul Rădăuți	30	15	3	12	65	36	+29	33	
6	Metalul Botoșani	30	13	7	10	43	30	+13	33	
7	ASA Câmpulung Moldovenesc	30	14	4	12	59	42	+17	32	
8	Dorna Vatra Dornei	30	12	6	12	47	49	−2	30	
9	Cristalul Dorohoi	30	13	3	14	41	45	−4	29	
10	Cimentul Bicaz	30	11	7	12	44	52	−8	29	
11	Cetatea Târgu Neamț	30	13	2	15	45	66	−21	28	
12	ITA Piatra Neamț	30	11	5	14	30	49	−19	27	
13	Bradul Roznov	30	12	2	16	30	39	−9	26	
14	Progresul Fălticeni	30	8	8	14	25	38	−13	24	
15	Danubiana Roman (R)	30	9	5	16	35	56	−21	23	Relegation to County Championship
16	Foresta Moldovița (R)	30	3	4	23	20	86	−66	10	Relegation to County Championship

Source: romaniansoccer.ro
Rules for classification: 1) points; 2) goal difference; 3) number of goals scored.
(C) Champions; (P) Promoted; (R) Relegated

=== Seria II ===
Pos	Team	Pld	W	D	L	GF	GA	GD	Pts	Promotion or relegation
1	Viitorul Vaslui (C, P)	30	20	3	7	64	23	+41	43	Promotion to Divizia B
2	Energia Gheorghiu-Dej	30	18	5	7	59	26	+33	41	
3	Chimia Mărășești	30	17	6	7	54	36	+18	40	
4	Petrolul Moinești	30	15	7	8	49	29	+20	37	
5	Letea Bacău	30	15	6	9	61	33	+28	36	
6	Constructorul Iași	30	16	3	11	52	37	+15	35	
7	Constructorul Vaslui	30	15	2	13	30	32	−2	32	
8	Minerul Comănești	30	14	3	13	55	41	+14	31	
9	Rulmentul Bârlad	30	11	8	11	32	40	−8	30	
10	Partizanul Bacău	30	13	3	14	31	42	−11	29	
11	Oituz Târgu Ocna	30	12	3	15	34	48	−14	27	
12	Nicolina Iași	30	9	4	17	31	43	−12	22	
13	Petrolistul Dărmănești	30	7	8	15	31	61	−30	22	
14	Tepro Iași	30	9	3	18	30	48	−18	21	
15	Hușana Huși (R)	30	7	4	19	33	75	−42	18	Relegation to County Championship
16	Textila Buhuși (R)	30	7	2	21	25	57	−32	16	Relegation to County Championship

Source: romaniansoccer.ro
Rules for classification: 1) points; 2) goal difference; 3) number of goals scored.
(C) Champions; (P) Promoted; (R) Relegated

=== Seria III ===
Pos	Team	Pld	W	D	L	GF	GA	GD	Pts	Promotion or relegation
1	Carpați Sinaia (C, P)	30	21	4	5	66	23	+43	46	Promotion to Divizia B
2	IRA Câmpina	30	20	4	6	66	20	+46	44	
3	Chimia Buzău	30	19	3	8	70	24	+46	41	
4	Poiana Câmpina	30	15	6	9	58	32	+26	36	
5	Petrolul Teleajen Ploiești	30	15	5	10	48	33	+15	35	
6	Chimia Brazi	30	14	4	12	41	39	+2	32	
7	Victoria Florești	30	10	10	10	44	34	+10	30	
8	Ancora Galați	30	14	2	14	54	46	+8	30	
9	Caraimanul Bușteni	30	12	5	13	47	38	+9	29	
10	Dinamo Focșani	30	13	3	14	53	49	+4	29	
11	Petrolistul Boldești	30	12	5	13	35	43	−8	29	
12	Avântul Măneciu	30	12	2	16	39	62	−23	26	
13	Foresta Gugești	30	9	5	16	36	49	−13	23	
14	Luceafărul Focșani	30	9	5	16	33	72	−39	23	
15	Recolta Săhăteni (R)	30	4	8	18	20	74	−54	16	Relegation to County Championship
16	Metalosport Galați (R)	30	3	5	22	16	88	−72	11	Relegation to County Championship

Source: romaniansoccer.ro
Rules for classification: 1) points; 2) goal difference; 3) number of goals scored.
(C) Champions; (P) Promoted; (R) Relegated

=== Seria IV ===
Pos	Team	Pld	W	D	L	GF	GA	GD	Pts	Promotion or relegation
1	Tulcea (C, P)	30	19	8	3	64	20	+44	46	Promotion to Divizia B
2	Progresul Brăila	30	20	5	5	61	24	+37	45	
3	Cimentul Medgidia	30	18	4	8	75	37	+38	40	
4	Unirea Tricolor Brăila	30	16	8	6	54	33	+21	40	
5	Dunărea Tulcea	30	15	4	11	50	36	+14	34	
6	IMU Medgidia	30	11	11	8	39	30	+9	33	
7	Unirea Știința Eforie Nord	30	14	4	12	34	33	+1	32	
8	Dunărea Cernavodă	30	14	3	13	38	44	−6	31	
9	Victoria Țăndărei	30	13	4	13	46	48	−2	30	
10	Marina Mangalia	30	10	7	13	41	59	−18	27	
11	Dacia Unirea Brăila	30	10	6	14	32	38	−6	26	
12	Minerul Măcin	30	11	3	16	29	51	−22	25	
13	Electrica Constanța	30	9	5	16	35	37	−2	23	
14	Autobuzul Făurei	30	7	6	17	30	53	−23	20	
15	Șantierul Naval Constanța (R)	30	7	5	18	23	48	−25	19	Relegation to County Championship
16	Gloria Poarta Albă (R)	30	3	3	24	20	80	−60	9	Relegation to County Championship

Source: romaniansoccer.ro
Rules for classification: 1) points; 2) goal difference; 3) number of goals scored.
(C) Champions; (P) Promoted; (R) Relegated

=== Seria V ===
Pos	Team	Pld	W	D	L	GF	GA	GD	Pts	Promotion or relegation
1	Autobuzul București (C, P)	30	18	11	1	71	13	+58	47	Promotion to Divizia B
2	Unirea Tricolor București	30	18	7	5	53	27	+26	43	
3	TMB București	30	12	14	4	35	16	+19	38	
4	Automatica București	30	15	7	8	43	29	+14	37	
5	Flacăra Roșie București	30	11	11	8	37	35	+2	33	
6	ICSIM București	30	10	12	8	42	35	+7	32	
7	Azotul Slobozia	30	13	4	13	41	49	−8	30	
8	Abatorul București	30	9	11	10	32	36	−4	29	
9	IOR București	30	10	8	12	43	40	+3	28	
10	Electronica Obor București	30	10	7	13	38	35	+3	27	
11	Automecanica București	30	9	8	13	33	34	−1	26	
12	Sirena București	30	10	5	15	30	37	−7	25	
13	Avântul Urziceni	30	8	9	13	29	43	−14	25	
14	Șoimii Tarom București	30	7	11	12	27	41	−14	25	
15	Viitorul Chirnogi (R)	30	10	5	15	31	54	−23	25	Relegation to County Championship
16	Olimpia Giurgiu (R)	30	3	4	23	24	85	−61	10	Relegation to County Championship

Source: romaniansoccer.ro
Rules for classification: 1) points; 2) goal difference; 3) number of goals scored.
(C) Champions; (P) Promoted; (R) Relegated

=== Seria VI ===
Pos	Team	Pld	W	D	L	GF	GA	GD	Pts	Promotion or relegation
1	Muscelul Câmpulung (C, P)	30	20	5	5	77	22	+55	45	Promotion to Divizia B
2	Petrolul Târgoviște	30	16	6	8	53	35	+18	38	
3	Metalul Mija	30	15	7	8	56	33	+23	37	
4	Dacia Pitești	30	13	8	9	50	37	+13	34	
5	Petrolul Videle	30	14	6	10	47	39	+8	34	
6	Progresul Corabia	30	15	4	11	43	43	0	34	
7	Viitorul Scornicești	30	12	8	10	47	44	+3	32	
8	Rova Roșiorii de Vede	30	13	4	13	36	39	−3	30	
9	Cimentul Fieni	30	12	5	13	38	40	−2	29	
10	Cetatea Turnu Măgurele	30	9	9	12	45	46	−1	27	
11	Chimia Găești	30	10	6	14	41	43	−2	26	
12	Recolta Stoicănești	30	9	8	13	35	55	−20	26	
13	Progresul Pucioasa	30	9	7	14	40	56	−16	25	
14	Constructorul Pitești	30	9	7	14	38	57	−19	25	
15	Răsăritul Caracal (R)	30	8	9	13	24	47	−23	25	Relegation to County Championship
16	Oțelul Târgoviște (R)	30	5	3	22	31	65	−34	13	Relegation to County Championship

Source: romaniansoccer.ro
Rules for classification: 1) points; 2) goal difference; 3) number of goals scored.
(C) Champions; (P) Promoted; (R) Relegated

=== Seria VII ===
Pos	Team	Pld	W	D	L	GF	GA	GD	Pts	Promotion or relegation
1	Pandurii Târgu Jiu (C, P)	30	21	6	3	61	16	+45	48	Promotion to Divizia B
2	Drobeta-Turnu Severin	30	17	9	4	57	16	+41	43	
3	Minerul Motru	30	15	5	10	58	35	+23	35	
4	Metalurgistul Sadu	30	14	5	11	45	33	+12	33	
5	Dierna Orșova	30	14	3	13	31	43	−12	31	
6	Progresul Băilești	30	13	4	13	40	47	−7	30	
7	Lotru Brezoi	30	13	3	14	41	37	+4	29	
8	FOB Balș	30	12	4	14	42	47	−5	28	
9	Minerul Rovinari	30	10	6	14	35	39	−4	26	
10	Unirea Drăgășani	30	9	8	13	38	45	−7	26	
11	Chimistul Râmnicu Vâlcea	30	11	4	15	39	37	+2	26	
12	Unirea Drobeta-Turnu Severin	30	10	6	14	29	56	−27	26	
13	Constructorul TCI Craiova	30	10	5	15	33	45	−12	25	
14	CFR Craiova	30	10	5	15	25	45	−20	25	
15	Laminorul IPA Slatina (R)	30	10	5	15	37	59	−22	25	Relegation to County Championship
16	Dunărea Calafat (R)	30	8	8	14	34	45	−11	24	Relegation to County Championship

Source: romaniansoccer.ro
Rules for classification: 1) points; 2) goal difference; 3) number of goals scored.
(C) Champions; (P) Promoted; (R) Relegated

=== Seria VIII ===
Pos	Team	Pld	W	D	L	GF	GA	GD	Pts	Promotion or relegation
1	Minerul Moldova Nouă (C, P)	30	18	5	7	59	36	+23	41	Promotion to Divizia B
2	Minerul Anina	30	14	9	7	46	18	+28	37	
3	Laminorul Nădrag	30	16	3	11	53	46	+7	35	
4	Strungul Arad	30	14	6	10	59	47	+12	34	
5	Unirea Tomnatic	30	14	4	12	53	30	+23	32	
6	Vulturii Textila Lugoj	30	13	4	13	50	34	+16	30	
7	Electromotor Timișoara	30	13	4	13	45	37	+8	30	
8	Unirea Sânnicolau Mare	30	13	3	14	35	48	−13	29	
9	Metalul Oțelu Roșu	30	12	5	13	42	55	−13	29	
10	Gloria Arad	30	12	5	13	28	45	−17	29	
11	Gloria Reșița	30	12	4	14	51	41	+10	28	
12	Constructorul Arad	30	12	4	14	39	33	+6	28	
13	Nera Bozovici	30	12	4	14	45	60	−15	28	
14	Metalul Bocșa	30	13	2	15	43	64	−21	28	
15	Ceramica Jimbolia (R)	30	12	2	16	35	59	−24	26	Relegation to County Championship
16	Banatul Timișoara (R)	30	5	6	19	32	62	−30	16	Relegation to County Championship

Source: romaniansoccer.ro
Rules for classification: 1) points; 2) goal difference; 3) number of goals scored.
(C) Champions; (P) Promoted; (R) Relegated

=== Seria IX ===
Pos	Team	Pld	W	D	L	GF	GA	GD	Pts	Promotion or relegation
1	Victoria Carei (C, P)	30	20	4	6	58	15	+43	44	Promotion to Divizia B
2	Înfrățirea Oradea	30	17	7	6	59	28	+31	41	
3	Voința Oradea	30	13	8	9	52	30	+22	34	
4	Bihoreana Marghita	30	15	4	11	55	38	+17	34	
5	Recolta Salonta	30	13	5	12	42	49	−7	31	
6	Oțelul Bihor	30	12	7	11	42	50	−8	31	
7	Minerul Baia Sprie	30	11	8	11	41	35	+6	30	
8	Minerul Băița	30	13	4	13	53	50	+3	30	
9	Minerul Bihor	30	13	4	13	52	51	+1	30	
10	Minerul Șuncuiuș	30	13	3	14	32	44	−12	29	
11	Someșul Satu Mare	30	11	6	13	55	44	+11	28	
12	Cuprom Baia Mare	30	9	8	13	41	49	−8	26	
13	Oașul Negrești	30	11	4	15	34	47	−13	26	
14	Voința Carei	30	11	3	16	46	62	−16	25	
15	Gloria Șimleu Silvaniei (R)	30	9	7	14	36	52	−16	25	Relegation to County Championship
16	Victoria Zalău (R)	30	5	6	19	29	83	−54	16	Relegation to County Championship

Source: romaniansoccer.ro
Rules for classification: 1) points; 2) goal difference; 3) number of goals scored.
(C) Champions; (P) Promoted; (R) Relegated

=== Seria X ===
Pos	Team	Pld	W	D	L	GF	GA	GD	Pts	Promotion or relegation
1	Avântul Reghin (C, P)	30	18	4	8	44	27	+17	40	Promotion to Divizia B
2	Minerul Rodna	30	17	5	8	66	37	+29	39	
3	Metalul Aiud	30	17	3	10	56	35	+21	37	
4	Unirea Dej	30	18	1	11	55	37	+18	37	
5	Mureșul Luduș	30	14	5	11	56	32	+24	33	
6	Bradul Vișeu de Sus	30	14	5	11	32	45	−13	33	
7	Minerul Băiuț	30	14	4	12	44	44	0	32	
8	Metalul Sighișoara	30	14	3	13	42	35	+7	31	
9	Soda Ocna Mureș	30	14	2	14	44	43	+1	30	
10	Lăpușul Târgu Lăpuș	30	12	4	14	38	37	+1	28	
11	Foresta Bistrița	30	13	2	15	30	38	−8	28	
12	CIL Gherla	30	10	5	15	35	47	−12	25	
13	Tehnofrig Cluj-Napoca	30	8	9	13	24	37	−13	25	
14	Dermata Cluj-Napoca	30	8	6	16	31	59	−28	22	
15	Cimentul Turda (R)	30	9	3	18	46	53	−7	21	Relegation to County Championship
16	Minerul Borșa (Note: Minerul Borșa was expelled from championship after 23 rounds.) (R)	30	8	3	19	32	69	−37	19	Relegation to County Championship

Source: romaniansoccer.ro
Rules for classification: 1) points; 2) goal difference; 3) number of goals scored.
(C) Champions; (P) Promoted; (R) Relegated

=== Seria XI ===
Pos	Team	Pld	W	D	L	GF	GA	GD	Pts	Promotion or relegation
1	ICIM Brașov (C, P)	28	14	9	5	56	21	+35	37	Promotion to Divizia B
2	Viitorul Gheorgheni	28	13	7	8	34	25	+9	33	
3	Torpedo Zărnești	28	14	4	10	35	28	+7	32	
4	CSU Brașov	28	14	3	11	51	30	+21	31	
5	Metrom Brașov	28	11	9	8	30	23	+7	31	
6	Progresul Odorheiu Secuiesc	28	14	1	13	34	24	+10	29	
7	Minerul Baraolt	28	10	8	10	29	34	−5	28	
8	Chimia Orașul Victoria	28	11	6	11	27	34	−7	28	
9	Utilajul Făgăraș	28	11	4	13	42	33	+9	26	
10	Minerul Bălan	28	11	4	13	27	44	−17	26	
11	Carpați Brașov	28	8	9	11	20	22	−2	25	
12	Precizia Săcele	28	9	6	13	20	26	−6	24	
13	Forestierul Târgu Secuiesc	28	9	6	13	26	51	−25	24	
14	Unirea Sfântu Gheorghe	28	7	9	12	28	41	−13	23	
15	Mureșul Toplița (R)	28	8	7	13	33	56	−23	23	Relegation to County Championship
16	Măgura Codlea (Note: Măgura Codlea was expelled from championship after 10 rounds and all its results were canceled.) (D)	0	0	0	0	0	0	0	0	Expelled

Source: romaniansoccer.ro
Rules for classification: 1) points; 2) goal difference; 3) number of goals scored.
(C) Champions; (D) Disqualified; (P) Promoted; (R) Relegated

=== Seria XII ===
Pos	Team	Pld	W	D	L	GF	GA	GD	Pts	Promotion or relegation
1	Gaz Metan Mediaș (C, P)	30	18	7	5	54	15	+39	43	Promotion to Divizia B
2	Știința Petroșani	30	19	4	7	61	28	+33	42	
3	Laminorul Teliuc	30	15	5	10	51	36	+15	35	
4	IPA Sibiu	30	15	3	12	39	38	+1	33	
5	Metalul Copșa Mică	30	14	4	12	43	30	+13	32	
6	Unirea Alba Iulia	30	14	4	12	46	33	+13	32	
7	IMIX Agnita	30	15	2	13	40	47	−7	32	
8	Textila Cisnădie	30	14	3	13	39	36	+3	31	
9	Minerul Ghelar	30	13	4	13	35	26	+9	30	
10	Inter Sibiu	30	11	7	12	34	32	+2	29	
11	FIL Orăștie	30	13	3	14	36	43	−7	29	
12	CFR Simeria	30	11	5	14	39	36	+3	27	
13	Automecanica Mediaș	30	10	7	13	34	48	−14	27	
14	Constructorul Alba Iulia	30	10	5	15	38	36	+2	25	
15	CIL Blaj (R)	30	11	2	17	39	45	−6	24	Relegation to County Championship
16	Textila Sebeș (R)	30	4	1	25	19	118	−99	9	Relegation to County Championship

Source: romaniansoccer.ro
Rules for classification: 1) points; 2) goal difference; 3) number of goals scored.
(C) Champions; (P) Promoted; (R) Relegated

== See also ==
- 1976–77 Divizia A
- 1976–77 Divizia B
- 1976–77 County Championship
- 1976–77 Cupa României
