= Gloria Stadium =

Gloria Stadium may refer to:

- Jean Pădureanu Stadium, in Bistrița, Romania, home ground of Gloria Bistrița
- Gloria Stadium in Reșița, Romania, home ground of the former CS Gloria Reșița
