= 1975–76 County Championship =

34th season of the Liga IV, the fourth tier of the Romanian football league

Liga IV
- Season: 1975–76

The 1975–76 County Championship was the 34th season of the Liga IV, the fourth tier of the Romanian football league system. The champions of each county association play against one from a neighboring county in a play-off to gain promotion to Divizia C.

== County championships ==
- Alba (AB)
- Arad (AR)
- Argeș (AG)
- Bacău (BC)
- Bihor (BH)
- Bistrița-Năsăud (BN)
- Botoșani (BT)
- Brașov (BV)
- Brăila (BR)
- Bucharest (B)
- Buzău (BZ)
- Caraș-Severin (CS)
- Cluj (CJ)
- Constanța (CT)
- Covasna (CV)
- Dâmbovița (DB)
- Dolj (DJ)
- Galați (GL)
- Gorj (GJ)
- Harghita (HR)
- Hunedoara (HD)
- Ialomița (IL)
- Iași (IS)
- Ilfov (IF)
- Maramureș (MM)
- Mehedinți (MH)
- Mureș (MS)
- Neamț (NT)
- Olt (OT)
- Prahova (PH)
- Satu Mare (SM)
- Sălaj (SJ)
- Sibiu (SB)
- Suceava (SV)
- Teleorman (TR)
- Timiș (TM)
- Tulcea (TL)
- Vaslui (VS)
- Vâlcea (VL)
- Vrancea (VN)

== Promotion play-off ==
Teams promoted to Divizia C without a play-off matches as teams from less represented counties in the third division.

- (AG) Dacia Pitești
- (IF) Viitorul Chirnogi
- (TR) Petrolul Videle
- (GL) Metalosport Galați
- (IL) Victoria Țăndărei
- (SJ) Victoria Zalău
- (MS) Mureșul Luduș
- (BZ) Recolta Săhăteni

The matches were played on 4 and 11 July 1976.

Team 1	Agg.	Team 2	1st leg	2nd leg
Oțelul Bihor (BH)	4–1	(SM) Minerul Turț	4–0	0–1
Progresul Pucioasa (DB)	3–3 (Note: Progresul Pucioasa won on the away goals rule.)	(VL) Cozia Călimănești	2–0	1–3
Automecanica Mediaș (SB)	5–4	(AB) CFR Teiuș	4–1	1–3
FIL Orăștie (HD)	3–2	(GJ) Petrolul Țicleni	3–0	0–2
Sportul Muncitoresc Suceava (SV)	1–2	(NT) ITA Piatra Neamț	1–0	0–2
Mecanizatorul Șimian (MH)	0–4	(CS) Nera Bozovici	0–1	0–3
Șantierul Naval Constanța (CT)	7–5	(TL) Alumina Tulcea	5–0	2–5
Lăpușul Târgu Lăpuș (MM)	4–2	(CJ) Electrometal Cluj-Napoca	4–0	0–2
Laminorul IPA Slatina (OT)	7–1	(DJ) Steagul Roșu Plenița	6–0	1–1
Nicolina lași (IS)	4–2	(BT) Metalul Botoșani	2–0	2–2
IUC Ploiești (PH)	1–6	(B) Abatorul București	0–2	1–4
Măgura Codlea (BV)	5–1	(CV) Forestierul Covasna	3–0	2–1
Șoimii Lipova (AR)	1–2	(TM) Laminorul Nădrag	1–0	0–2 (a.e.t.)
Mureșul Toplița (HR)	8–1	(BN) Constructorul Bistrița	5–1	3–0
Fulgerul PTTR Vaslui (VS)	2–3	(BC) Partizanul Bacău	2–1	0–2
Constructorul Brăila (BR)	3–4	(VN) Dinamo Focșani	2–1	1–3

== Championships standings ==
=== Arad County ===
Team changes from the previous season

Relegated from Divizia C

- Crișana Sebiș

Promoted to Divizia C

- Gloria Arad

Promoted from Arad County Championship II

- Victoria Zăbrani
- Unirea Sântana

Relegated to Arad County Championship II

- Electrometal Lipova (18th place)

Other changes

- Mureșul Arad withdrew.
- Libertatea Arad (17th place) was spared from relegation.

Pos	Team	Pld	W	D	L	GF	GA	GD	Pts	Promotion or relegation
1	Șoimii Lipova (C, Q)	34	24	3	7	57	23	+34	51	Qualification to promotion play-off
2	Gloria Ineu	34	19	11	4	55	23	+32	49	
3	Foresta Arad	34	16	7	11	58	42	+16	39	
4	Unirea Șofronea	34	17	4	13	68	58	+10	38	
5	Victoria Ineu	34	13	12	9	45	45	0	38	
6	Înfrățirea Iratoșu	34	15	7	12	46	35	+11	37	
7	Stăruința Dorobanți	34	15	5	14	47	42	+5	35	
8	Victoria Zăbrani	34	12	10	12	53	50	+3	34	
9	Șiriana Șiria	34	11	10	13	40	42	−2	32	
10	Libertatea Arad	34	12	8	14	54	59	−5	32	
11	Frontiera Curtici	34	13	6	15	61	69	−8	32	
12	Unirea Sântana	34	11	9	14	47	52	−5	31	
13	Șoimii Pâncota	34	12	7	15	28	39	−11	31	
14	Crișana Sebiș	34	11	7	16	44	50	−6	29	
15	Victoria Chișineu-Criș	34	10	8	16	45	61	−16	28	
16	Foresta Beliu	34	9	8	17	49	61	−12	26	
17	Progresul Pecica	34	10	6	18	30	56	−26	26	Spared from relegation
18	FZ Arad	34	8	8	18	33	53	−20	24	Spared from relegation

Rules for classification: 1) Points; 2) Goal difference; 3) Number of goals scored.
(C) Champions; (Q) Qualified for the phase indicated

=== Caraș-Severin County ===
Pos	Team	Pld	W	D	L	GF	GA	GD	Pts	Qualification or relegation
1	Nera Bozovici (C, Q)	30	21	4	5	83	26	+57	46	Qualification to promotion play-off
2	Muncitorul Reșița	30	17	6	7	82	34	+48	40	
3	Siderurgistul Reșița	30	18	4	8	77	31	+46	40	
4	CPL Caransebeș	30	17	6	7	61	34	+27	40	
5	Electrica Reșița	30	14	8	8	57	43	+14	36	
6	Metalul Topleț	30	15	4	11	56	58	−2	34	
7	Foresta Bocșa	30	13	7	10	52	35	+17	33	
8	CFR Oravița	30	14	4	12	66	52	+14	32	
9	Victoria Caransebeș	30	13	4	13	57	44	+13	30	
10	Bistra Glimboca	30	13	4	13	45	65	−20	30	
11	Energia Reșița	30	12	5	13	37	36	+1	29	
12	Foresta Zăvoi	30	11	4	15	46	61	−15	26	
13	Minerul Ocna de Fier	30	9	5	16	45	64	−19	23	
14	Metalul Anina	29	7	5	17	47	66	−19	19	
15	Minerul Dognecea	30	4	5	21	29	88	−59	13	
16	Metalul Caransebeș	29	3	1	25	22	125	−103	7	

Rules for classification: 1) Points; 2) Goal difference; 3) Number of goals scored.
(C) Champions; (Q) Qualified for the phase indicated

=== Dolj County ===
Series I

Pos	Team	Pld	W	D	L	GF	GA	GD	Pts	Qualification or relegation
1	Autotransport Craiova (Q)	26	14	7	5	53	21	+32	35	Qualification to championship final
2	Chimia Craiova	26	12	8	6	54	31	+23	32	
3	Progresul Segarcea	26	13	4	9	66	36	+30	30	
4	Jiul TCIF Craiova	26	12	4	10	53	33	+20	28	
5	Avântul Filiași	26	12	4	10	56	51	+5	28	
6	Știința Craiova	26	12	4	10	45	54	−9	28	
7	Progresul Radovan	26	11	3	12	54	40	+14	25	
8	Progresul Cârcea	26	10	5	11	47	68	−21	25	
9	Viitorul Coșoveni	26	11	2	13	49	59	−10	24	
10	Unirea Tricolor Dăbuleni	26	11	1	14	52	58	−6	23	
11	Tractorul Predești	26	10	3	13	51	62	−11	23	
12	Fulgerul Mârșani	26	10	3	13	45	66	−21	23	
13	Victoria Bratovoiești	26	10	2	14	43	54	−11	22	
14	Viitorul Terpezița	26	7	2	17	49	90	−41	16	

Rules for classification: 1) Points; 2) Goal difference; 3) Number of goals scored.
(Q) Qualified for the phase indicated

Series II

Pos	Team	Pld	W	D	L	GF	GA	GD	Pts	Qualification or relegation
1	Steagul Roșu Plenița (Q)	24	15	3	6	62	29	+33	33	Qualification to championship final
2	Unirea Goicea Mare	24	15	2	7	53	24	+29	32	
3	Dunărea Bistreț	24	14	4	6	61	37	+24	32	
4	Progresul Goicea Mică	24	13	4	7	50	29	+21	30	
5	Recolta Dunăreni	24	11	6	7	39	31	+8	28	
6	Fulgerul Maglavit	24	12	4	8	46	46	0	28	
7	Recolta Urzicuța	24	11	4	9	36	41	−5	26	
8	Avântul Bârca	24	10	3	11	35	30	+5	23	
9	Eruga Siliștea Crucii	24	10	2	12	50	41	+9	22	
10	Recolta Măceșu de Jos	24	8	5	11	25	39	−14	21	
11	Recolta Ostroveni	24	6	4	14	28	54	−26	16	
12	Electrica Băilești	24	5	3	16	31	58	−27	13	
13	Desnățuiul Giurgița	24	3	2	19	19	76	−57	8	
14	Recolta Afumați (Note: Recolta Afumați was excluded in the first part of the season and all its results were canceled.) (D)	0	0	0	0	0	0	0	0	Withdrew

Rules for classification: 1) Points; 2) Goal difference; 3) Number of goals scored.
(D) Disqualified; (Q) Qualified for the phase indicated
Notes:

Championship final

The matches were played on 6 and 13 June 1976.

Team 1	Agg.	Team 2	1st leg	2nd leg
Steagul Roșu Plenița	8–3	Autotransport Craiova	3–0	5–3

Steagul Roșu Plenița won the Dolj County Championship and qualify for promotion play-off in Divizia C.

=== Harghita County ===
Team changes from the previous season

Relegated from Divizia C

- Unirea Cristuru Secuiesc

Promoted to Divizia C

- —

Promoted from Harghita County Championship II

- Voința Toplița
- ASM Odorheiu Secuiesc

Relegated to Harghita County Championship II

- Rapid Ciceu (14th place)
- Harghita Odorheiu Secuiesc (16th place, withdrew)

Other changes

- Harghita Cârța withdrew.
- Bucin Joseni (13th place) was spared from relegation.
- Recolta Ditrău was renamed Mobila Ditrău.

Pos	Team	Pld	W	D	L	GF	GA	GD	Pts	Qualification or relegation
1	Mureșul Toplița (C, Q)	30	24	3	3	103	20	+83	51	Qualification to promotion play-off
2	Metalul Vlăhița	30	22	4	4	88	18	+70	48	
3	Unirea Cristuru Secuiesc	30	19	3	8	78	34	+44	41	
4	Flamura Roșie Sânsimion	30	17	4	9	68	33	+35	38	
5	Voința Toplița	30	13	7	10	56	34	+22	33	
6	ASM Odorheiu Secuiesc	30	13	5	12	59	49	+10	31	
7	Explorarea Bălan	30	15	0	15	63	45	+18	30	
8	Bastionul Lăzarea	30	12	6	12	48	54	−6	30	
9	Unirea Tulgheș	30	11	5	14	44	51	−7	27	
10	Mobila Ditrău	30	11	5	14	35	48	−13	27	
11	Minerul Lueta	30	11	3	16	47	73	−26	25	
12	Apemin Borsec	30	10	4	16	55	84	−29	24	
13	Mureșul Suseni	30	8	6	16	43	84	−41	22	
14	Complexul Gălăuțaș	30	8	4	18	45	87	−42	20	
15	Bucin Joseni (Note: Bucin Joseni was excluded after 29 rounds and lost the remaining match with 0–3.) (R)	30	8	2	20	34	100	−66	18	Relegation to Harghita County Championship II
16	Bradul Hodoșa (R)	30	5	7	18	35	70	−35	17	Relegation to Harghita County Championship II

Rules for classification: 1) Points; 2) Goal difference; 3) Number of goals scored.
(C) Champions; (Q) Qualified for the phase indicated; (R) Relegated

=== Hunedoara County ===
Pos	Team	Pld	W	D	L	GF	GA	GD	Pts	Qualification or relegation
1	FIL Orăștie (C, Q)	28	21	1	6	61	23	+38	43	Qualification to promotion play-off
2	Laminatorul Hunedoara	28	18	5	5	68	26	+42	41	
3	Minerul Vulcan	28	18	1	9	54	24	+30	37	
4	Minerul Aninoasa	28	15	2	11	50	43	+7	32	
5	Aurul Certej	28	12	6	10	41	33	+8	30	
6	Autotransport Hațeg	28	14	2	12	54	48	+6	30	
7	Constructorul Hunedoara	28	13	4	11	46	48	−2	30	
8	Sportul Studențesc Hunedoara	28	10	7	11	34	44	−10	27	
9	EGCL Hunedoara	28	11	3	14	52	54	−2	25	
10	Dacia Vețel	28	10	4	14	43	49	−6	24	
11	Energia Paroșeni	28	11	2	15	66	75	−9	24	
12	Minerul Uricani	28	11	2	15	47	69	−22	24	
13	Parângul Lonea	28	8	6	14	38	50	−12	22	
14	Preparatorul Petrila	28	6	5	17	36	62	−26	17	
15	Metalul Crișcior	28	6	2	20	32	74	−42	14	

Rules for classification: 1) Points; 2) Goal difference; 3) Number of goals scored.
(C) Champions; (Q) Qualified for the phase indicated

=== Iași County ===
Team changes from the previous season

Relegated from Divizia C

- Nicolina Iași

Promoted to Divizia C

- Spicul Țigănași

Promoted from Iași County Championship II

- Locomotiva Pașcani
- Avântul Brătești
- Biruința Miroslovești
- Unirea Valea Seacă
- Siretul Lespezi
- Tehnoton Iași
- Recolta Gropnița
- Progresul Trifești
- Olimpia Popricani

Relegated to Iași County Championship II

- —

Other changes

- Viitorul Târgu Frumos and ITC Iași withdrew.
- URA Iași was renamed IRA Iași.
- Recolta Podu Iloaiei was renamed Unirea Podu Iloaiei.

Series I

Pos	Team	Pld	W	D	L	GF	GA	GD	Pts	Qualification or relegation
1	Podgoria Cotnari (Q)	28	20	6	2	93	34	+59	46	Qualification to championship final
2	Șoimii Iași	28	20	5	3	95	25	+70	45	
3	Viitorul Hârlau	28	19	4	5	82	16	+66	42	
4	Recolta Ruginoasa	28	16	4	8	72	37	+35	36	
5	Voința Moțca	28	11	6	11	57	40	+17	28	
6	Recolta Conțești	28	13	2	13	57	65	−8	28	
7	Locomotiva Pașcani	28	10	6	12	44	56	−12	26	
8	Biruința Miroslovești	28	11	3	14	57	63	−6	25	
9	IRA Iași	28	10	5	13	45	75	−30	25	
10	Siretul Lespezi	28	10	4	14	41	68	−27	24	
11	Avântul Brătești	28	10	0	18	52	70	−18	20	
12	Avântul Todirești	28	10	2	16	57	77	−20	22	
13	Olimpia Iași	28	7	5	16	48	64	−16	19	
14	Unirea Valea Seacă	28	8	3	17	54	88	−34	19	
15	Moldova Cristești	28	5	5	18	37	87	−50	15	

Rules for classification: 1) Points; 2) Goal difference; 3) Number of goals scored.
(Q) Qualified for the phase indicated

Series II

Pos	Team	Pld	W	D	L	GF	GA	GD	Pts	Qualification or relegation
1	Nicolina Iași (Q)	30	25	4	1	105	18	+87	54	Qualification to championship final
2	ASA Iași	30	22	6	2	113	32	+81	50	
3	Victoria ȚM Iași	30	18	5	7	70	47	+23	41	
4	Unirea Podu Iloaiei	30	16	9	5	76	57	+19	41	
5	Biruința Movileni	30	16	3	11	67	40	+27	35	
6	Prutul Prisăcani	30	16	1	13	57	44	+13	33	
7	Voința Bivolari	30	15	3	12	66	63	+3	33	
8	Moldova Tricotaje Iași	30	14	2	14	64	57	+7	30	
9	Tehnoton Iași	30	12	3	15	49	56	−7	27	
10	Mobila Iași	30	10	7	13	56	75	−19	27	
11	Chimia Iași	30	11	4	15	81	92	−11	26	
12	Zorile Lungani	30	11	2	17	66	80	−14	24	
13	Recolta Gropnița	30	10	2	18	55	88	−33	22	
14	Olimpia Popricani	30	8	2	20	47	95	−48	18	
15	Progresul Trifești	30	6	4	20	52	103	−51	16	
16	Luceafărul Vlădeni	30	2	0	28	23	104	−81	4	

Rules for classification: 1) Points; 2) Goal difference; 3) Number of goals scored.
(Q) Qualified for the phase indicated

Championship final

The match was played on 20 June 1976 at CFR Stadium in Pașcani.

Team 1	Score	Team 2
Nicolina Iași	2–1	Podgoria Cotnari

Nicolina Iași won the Iași County Championship and qualify for promotion play-off in Divizia C.

=== Maramureș County ===
Pos	Team	Pld	W	D	L	GF	GA	GD	Pts	Qualification or relegation
1	Lăpușul Târgu Lăpuș (C, Q)	26	21	2	3	87	24	+63	44	Qualification to promotion play-off
2	Minerul Ilba	26	18	4	4	72	15	+57	40	
3	Someșul Seini	26	18	2	6	63	26	+37	38	
4	Maramureșana Sighetu Marmației	26	13	8	5	61	32	+29	34	
5	Gloria Baia Mare	26	14	4	8	75	29	+46	32	
6	Oțelul Baia Mare	26	10	6	10	53	38	+15	26	
7	Iza Dragomirești	26	9	6	11	52	69	−17	24	
8	Voința Baia Mare	26	9	5	12	47	51	−4	23	
9	Tractorul Satulung	26	8	4	14	37	57	−20	20	
10	Pietrosul Borșa	26	9	2	15	32	64	−32	20	
11	Forestiera Câmpulung la Tisa	26	8	3	15	36	58	−22	19	
12	Electrica Baia Mare	26	7	5	14	37	45	−8	19	
13	Olimpia Baia Mare	26	4	5	17	28	80	−52	13	
14	Voința Sighetu Marmației	26	4	4	18	18	80	−62	12	
15	Ronișoara Rona de Sus (Note: Ronișoara Rona de Sus and Aurul Săsar withdrew in the first part of the season and all their results were canceled.) (D)	0	0	0	0	0	0	0	0	Withdrew
16	Aurul Săsar (D)	0	0	0	0	0	0	0	0	Withdrew

Rules for classification: 1) Points; 2) Goal difference; 3) Number of goals scored.
(C) Champions; (D) Disqualified; (Q) Qualified for the phase indicated

=== Mureș County ===
Team changes from the previous season

Relegated from Divizia C

- Viitorul Târgu Mureș

Promoted to Divizia C

- —

Promoted from Mureș County Championship II

- Recolta Vălenii de Mureș
- Arieșul Hădăreni

Relegated to Mureș County Championship II

- Fabrica de Zahăr Târgu Mureș
- Dermagant Târgu Mureș
- ILEFOR Târgu Mureș

Other changes

- Metalul Sighișoara was renamed Victoria Sighișoara.

Pos	Team	Pld	W	D	L	GF	GA	GD	Pts	Qualification or relegation
1	Mureșul Luduș (C, Q)	30	20	5	5	76	37	+39	45	Qualification to promotion play-off
2	Metalotehnica Târgu Mureș	30	18	5	7	60	24	+36	41	
3	Viitorul Târgu Mureș	30	15	6	9	55	39	+16	36	
4	Oțelul Reghin	30	14	7	9	50	30	+20	35	
5	Energia Iernut	30	14	6	10	70	44	+26	34	
6	Voința Miercurea Nirajului	30	12	7	11	48	39	+9	31	
7	Electromureș Târgu Mureș	30	14	3	13	42	42	0	31	
8	Sticla Târnăveni	30	13	4	13	54	44	+10	30	
9	Viitorul Aluniș	30	14	1	15	51	72	−21	29	
10	Lemnarul Târgu Mureș	30	10	8	12	41	42	−1	28	
11	Victoria Sighișoara	30	11	6	13	40	58	−18	28	
12	Recolta Vălenii de Mureș	30	11	4	15	42	52	−10	26	
13	Arieșul Hădăreni	30	11	4	15	48	66	−18	26	
14	Tractorul Sărmașu	30	9	7	14	31	42	−11	25	
15	Voința Sâncraiu de Mureș (R)	30	10	2	18	38	63	−25	22	Relegation to Mureș County Championship II
16	Unirea Bahnea (R)	30	3	7	20	21	73	−52	13	Relegation to Mureș County Championship II

Rules for classification: 1) Points; 2) Goal difference; 3) Number of goals scored.
(C) Champions; (Q) Qualified for the phase indicated; (R) Relegated

=== Neamț County ===
Team changes from the previous season

Relegated from Divizia C

- —

Promoted to Divizia C

- Ozana Târgu Neamț

Promoted from Neamț County Championship II

- Recolta Bâra
- Voința Târgu Neamț

Relegated to Neamț County Championship II

- Biruința Negrești

Pos	Team	Pld	W	D	L	GF	GA	GD	Pts	Qualification or relegation
1	ITA Piatra Neamț (C, Q)	26	15	6	5	74	35	+39	36	Qualification to promotion play-off
2	Vulturul Zănești	26	14	6	6	50	29	+21	34	
3	Azochim Săvinești	26	14	6	6	44	32	+12	34	
4	Celuloza Piatra Neamț	26	12	9	5	65	23	+42	33	
5	Volvatir Târgu Neamț	26	13	5	8	49	40	+9	31	
6	Metalul Piatra Neamț	26	12	7	7	43	35	+8	31	
7	Industria Locală Piatra Neamț	26	11	3	12	43	40	+3	25	
8	Hârtia Piatra Neamț	26	8	9	9	42	42	0	25	
9	Spicul Tămășeni	26	10	4	12	37	54	−17	24	
10	Victoria Tarcău	26	8	6	12	43	47	−4	22	
11	Voința Borlești	26	6	7	13	45	48	−3	19	
12	Metalul Bicaz	26	6	6	14	31	56	−25	18	
13	Recolta Bâra	26	7	4	15	40	70	−30	18	
14	Voința Târgu Neamț	26	4	4	18	26	81	−55	12	

Rules for classification: 1) Points; 2) Goal difference; 3) Number of goals scored.
(C) Champions; (Q) Qualified for the phase indicated

=== Olt County ===
Championship final

Team 1	Agg.	Team 2	1st leg	2nd leg
Laminorul IPA Slatina	6–3	Rapid Piatra-Olt	2–1	4–2

Laminorul IPA Slatina won the Olt County Championship and qualify for promotion play-off in Divizia C.

=== Prahova County ===
Team changes from the previous season

Relegated from Divizia C

- —

Promoted to Divizia C

- —

Promoted from Prahova County Championship II

- Flacăra Ploiești (winners)
- Feroemail Ploiești (runners-up)

Relegated to Prahova County Championship II

- Flacăra Câmpina (15th place)
- Energia Vălenii de Munte (16th place)

Other changes

- Flacăra Ploiești was renamed Carotajul Ploiești.

Pos	Team	Pld	W	D	L	GF	GA	GD	Pts	Qualification or relegation
1	IUC Ploiești (C, Q)	30	15	11	4	58	33	+25	41	Qualification to promotion play-off
2	Electromotor Câmpina	30	15	8	7	54	27	+27	38	
3	Dacia Ploiești	30	14	9	7	43	27	+16	37	
4	Chimistul Valea Călugărească	30	15	7	8	51	37	+14	37	
5	Petrolul Băicoi	30	13	10	7	43	21	+22	36	
6	PECO Ploiești	30	12	11	7	55	35	+20	35	
7	Tricolorul Breaza	30	14	6	10	41	41	0	34	
8	Metalul Câmpina	30	8	12	10	33	36	−3	28	
9	Feroemail Ploiești	30	8	12	10	34	38	−4	28	
10	Petrolul Urlați	30	11	6	13	36	50	−14	28	
11	Flamura Roșie Dorobanțul Ploiești	30	11	4	15	28	44	−16	26	
12	Carotajul Ploiești	30	8	9	13	40	46	−6	25	
13	Rapid Mizil	30	8	7	15	37	52	−15	23	
14	Geamuri Scăeni	30	7	8	15	33	36	−3	22	
15	Viitorul Slănic (R)	30	8	6	16	34	64	−30	22	Relegation to Prahova County Championship II
16	Electrica Câmpina (R)	30	7	6	17	26	59	−33	20	Relegation to Prahova County Championship II

Rules for classification: 1) Points; 2) Goal difference; 3) Number of goals scored.
(C) Champions; (Q) Qualified for the phase indicated; (R) Relegated

=== Sălaj County ===
Pos	Team	Pld	W	D	L	GF	GA	GD	Pts	Qualification or relegation
1	Victoria Zalău (C, Q)	26	24	2	0	115	8	+107	50	Qualification to promotion play-off
2	Minerul Sărmășag	26	19	3	4	70	23	+47	41	
3	Energia Sânmihaiu Almașului	26	16	5	5	57	24	+33	37	
4	Silvania Cehu Silvaniei	26	12	4	10	48	48	0	28	
5	Elcond Zalău (Note: Elcond Zalău replaced Porolissum Ortelec during the winter break and took over all its results.)	26	12	3	11	63	44	+19	27	
6	Unirea Hida	26	11	4	11	52	50	+2	26	
7	Progresul Bălan	26	12	2	12	59	63	−4	26	
8	Constructorul Zalău	26	10	5	11	41	49	−8	25	
9	Minerul Surduc	26	11	2	13	55	51	+4	24	
10	Someșul Ileanda	26	11	2	13	50	61	−11	24	
11	Unirea Tricolor Nadiș	26	7	4	15	34	63	−29	18	
12	Spartac Crasna	26	6	4	16	52	87	−35	16	
13	Recolta Almaș	26	5	5	16	40	97	−57	15	
14	Drum Nou Dragu	26	2	3	21	30	98	−68	7	

Rules for classification: 1) Points; 2) Goal difference; 3) Number of goals scored.
(C) Champions; (Q) Qualified for the phase indicated

=== Sibiu County ===
Championship final

Team 1	Score	Team 2
Automecanica Mediaș	1–0	Construcții Sibiu

Automecanica Mediaș won the Sibiu County Championship and qualify for promotion play-off in Divizia C.

=== Suceava County ===
Series I

Pos	Team	Pld	W	D	L	GF	GA	GD	Pts	Qualification or relegation
1	Sportul Muncitoresc Suceava (Q)	34	25	2	7	87	32	+55	52	Qualification to championship final
2	Siretul Dolhasca	34	22	2	10	111	44	+67	46	
3	Viitorul Liteni	34	20	4	10	87	72	+15	44	
4	Avântul Todirești	34	21	1	12	104	50	+54	43	
5	Fuiorul Cornu Luncii	34	20	3	11	84	48	+36	43	
6	Scânteia Prelipca	34	18	5	11	74	47	+27	41	
7	Recolta Dumbrăveni	34	17	4	13	85	55	+30	38	
8	Recolta Bosanci	34	17	4	13	69	54	+15	38	
9	Zimbrul Suceava	34	14	8	12	70	74	−4	36	
10	Recolta Fîntînele	34	16	3	15	58	62	−4	35	
11	Viitorul Verești (R)	34	16	2	16	70	61	+9	34	Relegation to Suceava County Championship II
12	Viitorul Chilișeni (R)	34	14	2	18	69	64	+5	30	Relegation to Suceava County Championship II
13	Progresul Salcea (R)	34	13	2	19	65	88	−23	28	Relegation to Suceava County Championship II
14	Voința Bunești (R)	34	13	2	19	63	99	−36	28	Relegation to Suceava County Championship II
15	Forestierul Cacica (R)	34	12	2	20	60	73	−13	26	Relegation to Suceava County Championship II
16	Spartac Suceava (Note: Spartac Suceava and Știința Vadu Moldovei withdrew after the first half of the season and lost all their remaining matches 0–3.) (R)	34	8	4	22	36	73	−37	20	Relegation to Suceava County Championship II
17	Victoria Dolhești (R)	34	8	2	24	53	106	−53	18	Relegation to Suceava County Championship II
18	Știința Vadu Moldovei (R)	34	2	1	31	13	129	−116	5	Relegation to Suceava County Championship II

Rules for classification: 1) Points; 2) Goal difference; 3) Number of goals scored.
(Q) Qualified for the phase indicated; (R) Relegated
Notes:

Series II

Pos	Team	Pld	W	D	L	GF	GA	GD	Pts	Qualification or relegation
1	Bistrița Broșteni (Q)	28	24	2	2	83	25	+58	50	Qualification to championship final
2	Bradul Vama	28	22	1	5	80	22	+58	45	
3	Unirea Siret	28	18	1	9	72	46	+26	37	
4	Avântul Gălănești	28	16	4	8	58	42	+16	36	
5	Flacăra Vicovu de Jos	28	16	3	9	66	49	+17	35	
6	Forestierul Falcău	28	16	1	11	53	34	+19	33	
7	Progresul Rădăuți	28	13	6	9	46	37	+9	32	
8	Constructorul Câmpulung Moldovenesc	28	14	3	11	56	47	+9	31	
9	Victoria Solca	28	11	3	14	49	69	−20	25	
10	Locomotiva Dornești (R)	28	9	4	15	45	53	−8	22	Relegation to Suceava County Championship II
11	CFR Suceava (R)	28	9	4	15	38	47	−9	22	Relegation to Suceava County Championship II
12	Progresul Câmpulung Moldovenesc (R)	28	8	4	16	47	66	−19	20	Relegation to Suceava County Championship II
13	Minerul Fundu Moldovei (R)	28	10	0	18	49	71	−22	20	Relegation to Suceava County Championship II
14	Energia Putna (R)	28	5	0	23	24	91	−67	10	Relegation to Suceava County Championship II
15	Forestierul Sucevița (Note: Forestierul Sucevița withdrew after the first half of the season and lost all its remaining matches 0–3.) (R)	28	2	0	26	12	78	−66	4	Relegation to Suceava County Championship II

Rules for classification: 1) Points; 2) Goal difference; 3) Number of goals scored.
(Q) Qualified for the phase indicated; (R) Relegated
Notes:

Championship final

The first and second leg matches were played on 6 and 13 June 1976, and a third match was necessary, played on 16 June 1976 on neutral ground at Câmpulung Moldovenesc.

Team 1	Series	Team 2	Game 1	Game 2	Game 3
Sportul Muncitoresc Suceava	4–4 (7–5 p)	Bistrița Broșteni	2–0	0–2	2–2 (a.e.t.)

Sportul Muncitoresc Suceava won the Suceava County Championship and qualify for promotion play-off in Divizia C.

== See also ==
- 1975–76 Divizia A
- 1975–76 Divizia B
- 1975–76 Divizia C
- 1975–76 Cupa României
