= 1976–77 Divizia B =

37th season of the second tier of the Romanian football league system

Divizia B
- Season: 1976–77
- Promoted: Petrolul Ploiești; CS Târgoviște; Olimpia Satu Mare
- Relegated: Unirea Focșani; Flacăra-Automecanica Moreni; Sticla Arieșul Turda; Borzești; Voința București; Rapid Arad; Minerul Gura Humorului; SN Oltenița; IS Câmpia Turzii; Olimpia Râmnicu Sărat; Tehnometal București; Minerul Cavnic

The 1976–77 Divizia B was the 37th season of the second tier of the Romanian football league system. The format has been maintained to three series, each of them having 18 teams. At the end of the season the winners of the series promoted to Divizia A and the last four places from each series relegated to Divizia C.

== Team changes ==
=== To Divizia B ===
Promoted from Divizia C

- Minerul Gura Humorului
- Relonul Săvinești
- Olimpia Râmnicu Sărat
- Portul Constanța
- Tehnometal București
- Flacăra-Automecanica Moreni
- Minerul Lupeni
- Aurul Brad
- Armătura Zalău
- Minerul Cavnic
- Chimica Târnăveni
- Oltul Sfântu Gheorghe

Relegated from Divizia A

- Olimpia Satu Mare
- CFR Cluj
- Universitatea Cluj

=== From Divizia B ===
Relegated to Divizia C

- CS Botoșani
- Minerul Motru
- Minerul Moldova Nouă
- Cimentul Medgidia
- Metalul Mija
- Gaz Metan Mediaș
- Viitorul Vaslui
- Metrom Brașov
- Victoria Carei
- Tulcea
- Autobuzul București
- Unirea Tomnatic

Promoted to Divizia A

- FCM Galați
- Progresul București
- Corvinul Hunedoara

== League tables ==
=== Serie I ===
Pos	Team	Pld	W	D	L	GF	GA	GD	Pts	Promotion or relegation
1	Petrolul Ploiești (C, P)	34	24	8	2	73	16	+57	56	Promotion to Divizia A
2	Gloria Buzău	34	15	9	10	42	29	+13	39	
3	Relonul Săvinești	34	16	6	12	42	40	+2	38	
4	Metalul Plopeni	34	15	7	12	53	35	+18	37	
5	Oltul Sfântu Gheorghe	34	14	7	13	33	32	+1	35	
6	CSM Suceava	34	14	7	13	30	39	−9	35	
7	CSU Galați	34	14	6	14	59	47	+12	34	
8	Prahova Ploiești	34	13	8	13	42	38	+4	34	
9	FC Brăila	34	11	12	11	51	51	0	34	
10	Ceahlăul Piatra Neamț	34	14	6	14	38	45	−7	34	
11	CFR Pașcani	34	13	7	14	43	38	+5	33	
12	Victoria Tecuci	34	12	9	13	43	53	−10	33	
13	Portul Constanța	34	11	10	13	39	47	−8	32	
14	Celuloza Călărași	34	14	3	17	36	38	−2	31	
15	Unirea Focșani (R)	34	12	7	15	33	41	−8	31	Relegation to Divizia C
16	Borzești (R)	34	11	8	15	19	35	−16	30	Relegation to Divizia C
17	Minerul Gura Humorului (R)	34	10	8	16	37	43	−6	28	Relegation to Divizia C
18	Olimpia Râmnicu Sărat (R)	34	4	10	20	19	65	−46	18	Relegation to Divizia C

Source: romaniansoccer.ro (in Romanian)
Rules for classification: 1) Points; 2) Goal difference; 3) Goals scored; 4) Head-to-head points; 5) Head-to-head goal difference; 6) Head-to-head goals scored; 7) Head-to-head away goals scored.
(C) Champions; (P) Promoted; (R) Relegated

=== Serie II ===
Pos	Team	Pld	W	D	L	GF	GA	GD	Pts	Promotion or relegation
1	CS Târgoviște (C, P)	34	21	6	7	65	21	+44	48	Promotion to Divizia A
2	Steagul Roșu Brașov	34	22	2	10	51	32	+19	46	
3	Chimia Râmnicu Vâlcea	34	22	1	11	69	42	+27	45	
4	Unirea Alexandria	34	16	5	13	42	25	+17	37	
5	Nitramonia Făgăraș	34	17	3	14	44	37	+7	37	
6	Metalul București	34	15	5	14	41	43	−2	35	
7	Chimica Târnăveni	34	16	3	15	40	44	−4	35	
8	Dinamo Slatina	34	15	4	15	45	38	+7	34	
9	Electroputere Craiova	34	12	10	12	56	51	+5	34	
10	FCM Giurgiu	34	13	8	13	42	46	−4	34	
11	Șoimii Sibiu	34	13	7	14	49	41	+8	33	
12	Chimia Turnu Măgurele	34	14	5	15	41	43	−2	33	
13	Metalurgistul Cugir	34	14	5	15	29	33	−4	33	
14	Tractorul Brașov	34	13	7	14	37	47	−10	33	
15	Flacăra-Automecanica Moreni (R)	34	14	4	16	37	37	0	32	Relegation to Divizia C
16	Voința București (R)	34	10	5	19	29	54	−25	25	Relegation to Divizia C
17	SN Oltenița (R)	34	10	3	21	27	56	−29	23	Relegation to Divizia C
18	Tehnometal București (R)	34	5	5	24	18	72	−54	15	Relegation to Divizia C

Source: romaniansoccer.ro (in Romanian)
Rules for classification: 1) Points; 2) Goal difference; 3) Goals scored; 4) Head-to-head points; 5) Head-to-head goal difference; 6) Head-to-head goals scored; 7) Head-to-head away goals scored.
(C) Champions; (P) Promoted; (R) Relegated

=== Serie III ===
Pos	Team	Pld	W	D	L	GF	GA	GD	Pts	Promotion or relegation
1	Olimpia Satu Mare (C, P)	34	23	3	8	61	26	+35	49	Promotion to Divizia A
2	Gloria Bistrița	34	17	5	12	54	51	+3	39	
3	Baia Mare	34	15	6	13	53	36	+17	36	
4	CFR Timișoara	34	17	2	15	48	47	+1	36	
5	CIL Sighetu Marmației	34	16	4	14	47	48	−1	36	
6	Aurul Brad	34	16	3	15	50	42	+8	35	
7	Armătura Zalău	34	15	5	14	45	45	0	35	
8	UM Timișoara	34	16	2	16	62	51	+11	34	
9	CFR Cluj	34	14	6	14	38	40	−2	34	
10	Mureșul Deva	34	15	4	15	37	43	−6	34	
11	Victoria Călan	34	15	3	16	44	52	−8	33	
12	Universitatea Cluj	34	14	4	16	37	40	−3	32	
13	Minerul Lupeni	34	13	6	15	37	47	−10	32	
14	Dacia Orăștie	34	15	2	17	41	54	−13	32	
15	Sticla Arieșul Turda (R)	34	13	5	16	38	43	−5	31	Relegation to Divizia C
16	Rapid Arad (R)	34	13	4	17	42	49	−7	30	Relegation to Divizia C
17	IS Câmpia Turzii (R)	34	12	5	17	50	62	−12	29	Relegation to Divizia C
18	Minerul Cavnic (R)	34	9	7	18	41	49	−8	25	Relegation to Divizia C

Source: romaniansoccer.ro (in Romanian)
Rules for classification: 1) Points; 2) Goal difference; 3) Goals scored; 4) Head-to-head points; 5) Head-to-head goal difference; 6) Head-to-head goals scored; 7) Head-to-head away goals scored.
(C) Champions; (P) Promoted; (R) Relegated

== See also ==
- 1976–77 Divizia A
- 1976–77 Divizia C
- 1976–77 County Championship
- 1976–77 Cupa României
