= 1974–75 Divizia C =

Third tier Romanian football league

Divizia C
- Season: 1974–75

The 1974–75 Divizia C was the 19th season of Liga III, the third tier of the Romanian football league system.

== Team changes ==
=== To Divizia C ===
Relegated from Divizia B

- Viitorul Vaslui
- Caraimanul Bușteni
- Petrolul Moinești
- Victoria Roman
- Minerul Motru
- Carpați Brașov
- Nitramonia Făgăraș
- Dunărea Giurgiu
- Olimpia Oradea
- Minerul Cavnic
- Textila Odorheiu Secuiesc
- Gloria Bistrița

Promoted from County Championship

- Laminorul Roman
- Foresta Moldovița
- Recolta Văleni
- Partizanul Bacău
- Petrolul Teleajen Ploiești
- Dinamo Focșani
- Mecanizatorul Târgu Bujor
- Dunărea Cernavodă
- Recolta Frecăței
- IPRECA Călărași
- Automatica București
- Viitorul Scornicești
- Oțelul Târgoviște
- Progresul Băilești
- Dinamo Orșova
- Ceramica Jimbolia
- Minerul Oravița
- Voința Oradea
- CM Cluj-Napoca
- Minerul Băiuț
- Unirea Tășnad
- Inter Sibiu
- Minerul Baraolt
- Măgura Codlea

=== From Divizia C ===
Promoted to Divizia B

- Foresta Fălticeni
- Relonul Săvinești
- Unirea Focșani
- Chimia Brăila
- Voința București
- Automatica Alexandria
- Victoria Călan
- Minerul Moldova Nouă
- Metalul Aiud
- Minerul Baia Sprie
- Oltul Sfântu Gheorghe
- CSU Brașov

Relegated to County Championship

- Victoria PTTR Botoșani
- ITA Iași
- Foresta Gugești
- Locomotiva Adjud
- Portul Brăila
- Carpați Nehoiu
- Constructorul Tulcea
- Arrubium Măcin
- Argeșul Mihăilești
- Sportul Ciorogârla
- ARO Câmpulung
- Petrolul Videle
- Metalul Topleț
- Petrolul Țicleni
- Furnirul Deta
- Gloria Arad
- Tehnofrig Cluj-Napoca
- Someșul Beclean
- Gloria Baia Mare
- Măgura Șimleu Silvaniei
- Mureșul Toplița
- Hebe Sângeorz-Băi
- Carpați Mârșa
- Oltul Râmnicu Vâlcea

=== Renamed teams ===
Trotușul Gheorghe Gheorghiu-Dej was renamed Carom Gheorghe Gheorghiu-Dej.

Recolta Văleni was renamed Tractorul Văleni before of the start of second part.

Mecanizatorul Târgu Bujor was renamed Bujorii Târgu Bujor.

Dinamo Slobozia was renamed Voința Slobozia.

Răsăritul Caracal was renamed Vagonul Caracal.

Energia Rovinari was renamed Minerul Rovinari.

AS Bocșa was renamed Metalul Bocșa.

Unirea Zalău was renamed Armătura Zalău.

Topitorul Baia Mare was renamed Cuprom Baia Mare.

Textila Odorheiu Secuiesc was renamed Progresul Odorheiu Secuiesc.

== League tables ==
=== Seria I ===
Pos	Team	Pld	W	D	L	GF	GA	GD	Pts	Promotion or relegation
1	Botoșani (C, P)	30	21	3	6	68	21	+47	45	Promotion to Divizia B
2	Danubiana Roman	30	16	5	9	56	30	+26	37	
3	ASA Câmpulung Moldovenesc	30	15	5	10	54	34	+20	35	
4	Laminorul Roman	30	15	4	11	57	39	+18	34	
5	Constructorul Iași	30	14	4	12	40	39	+1	32	
6	Minerul Gura Humorului	30	13	5	12	38	39	−1	31	
7	Avântul Frasin	30	12	6	12	35	42	−7	30	
8	Metalul Rădăuți	30	12	5	13	44	39	+5	29	
9	Dorna Vatra Dornei	30	13	3	14	44	50	−6	29	
10	Foresta Moldovița	30	13	3	14	29	49	−20	29	
11	Victoria Roman	30	11	6	13	43	37	+6	28	
12	Constructorul Botoșani	30	12	4	14	36	33	+3	28	
13	Cristalul Dorohoi	30	13	2	15	43	46	−3	28	
14	Unirea Iași	30	12	4	14	40	47	−7	28	
15	Sportul Muncitoresc Suceava (R)	30	10	5	15	37	50	−13	25	Relegation to County Championship
16	Nicolina Iași (R)	30	4	4	22	25	94	−69	12	Relegation to County Championship

Source: romaniansoccer.ro
(C) Champions; (P) Promoted; (R) Relegated

=== Seria II ===
Pos	Team	Pld	W	D	L	GF	GA	GD	Pts	Promotion or relegation
1	Viitorul Vaslui (C, P)	30	22	6	2	67	24	+43	50	Promotion to Divizia B
2	Petrolul Moinești	30	18	8	4	62	22	+40	44	
3	Letea Bacău	30	15	10	5	55	31	+24	40	
4	Energia Gheorghe Gheorghiu-Dej	30	16	7	7	49	16	+33	39	
5	Carom Gheorghe Gheorghiu-Dej	30	14	2	14	38	37	+1	30	
6	Cimentul Bicaz	30	12	5	13	53	39	+14	29	
7	Rulmentul Bârlad	30	10	9	11	25	28	−3	29	
8	Textila Buhuși	30	10	8	12	42	34	+8	28	
9	Minerul Comănești	30	10	8	12	43	37	+6	28	
10	Constructorul Vaslui	30	12	4	14	32	46	−14	28	
11	Oituz Târgu Ocna	30	11	5	14	30	45	−15	27	
12	Hușana Huși	30	10	5	15	42	55	−13	25	
13	Tractorul Văleni	30	11	3	16	35	68	−33	25	
14	Bradul Roznov	30	8	8	14	36	51	−15	24	
15	Partizanul Bacău (R)	30	8	2	20	36	68	−32	18	Relegation to County Championship
16	Constructorul Gheorghe Gheorghiu-Dej (Note: Constructorul Gheorghe Gheorghiu-Dej was excluded from championship at the end of first part.) (R)	30	7	2	21	23	67	−44	16	Relegation to County Championship

Source: romaniansoccer.ro
(C) Champions; (P) Promoted; (R) Relegated

=== Seria III ===
Pos	Team	Pld	W	D	L	GF	GA	GD	Pts	Promotion or relegation
1	Prahova Ploiești (C, P)	30	22	3	5	74	16	+58	47	Promotion to Divizia B
2	Poiana Câmpina	30	19	2	9	75	34	+41	40	
3	Chimia Brazi	30	15	6	9	59	32	+27	36	
4	Olimpia Râmnicu Sărat	30	14	6	10	55	55	0	34	
5	Chimia Buzău	30	12	8	10	32	33	−1	32	
6	Petrolul Teleajen Ploiești	30	12	7	11	40	27	+13	31	
7	IRA Câmpina	30	13	5	12	50	38	+12	31	
8	Carpați Sinaia	30	12	6	12	38	39	−1	30	
9	URA Tecuci	30	12	5	13	41	48	−7	29	
10	Victoria Florești	30	10	8	12	45	47	−2	28	
11	Avântul Măneciu	30	11	6	13	39	51	−12	28	
12	Petrolistul Boldești	30	9	8	13	43	55	−12	26	
13	Petrolul Berca	30	11	4	15	35	57	−22	26	
14	Luceafărul Focșani	30	9	6	15	36	49	−13	24	
15	Dinamo Focșani (R)	30	9	5	16	50	74	−24	23	Relegation to County Championship
16	Bujorii Târgu Bujor (R)	30	6	3	21	34	91	−57	15	Relegation to County Championship

Source: romaniansoccer.ro
(C) Champions; (P) Promoted; (R) Relegated

=== Seria IV ===
Pos	Team	Pld	W	D	L	GF	GA	GD	Pts	Promotion or relegation
1	Cimentul Medgidia (C, P)	30	20	7	3	51	16	+35	47	Promotion to Divizia B
2	Electrica Constanța	30	19	4	7	57	31	+26	42	
3	Ancora Galați	30	19	2	9	46	27	+19	40	
4	IMU Medgidia	30	15	8	7	48	24	+24	38	
5	Viitorul Brăila	30	13	6	11	39	35	+4	32	
6	Dunărea Tulcea	30	13	5	12	44	28	+16	31	
7	Marina Mangalia	30	13	5	12	37	32	+5	31	
8	Dunărea Cernavodă	30	12	6	12	28	30	−2	30	
9	Rapid Fetești	30	11	7	12	33	33	0	29	
10	Comerțul Brăila	30	11	6	13	23	27	−4	28	
11	Portul Constanța	30	10	7	13	50	35	+15	27	
12	Voința Constanța	30	10	7	13	41	46	−5	27	
13	Granitul Babadag	30	10	6	14	33	48	−15	26	
14	Știința Constanța	30	10	5	15	37	40	−3	25	
15	Tehnometal Galați (R)	30	8	5	17	27	55	−28	21	Relegation to County Championship
16	Recolta Frecăței (Note: 'Recolta Frecăței was excluded from championship after 24 rounds.) (R)	30	2	2	26	10	97	−87	6	Relegation to County Championship

Source: romaniansoccer.ro
(C) Champions; (P) Promoted; (R) Relegated

=== Seria V ===
Pos	Team	Pld	W	D	L	GF	GA	GD	Pts	Promotion or relegation
1	Dunărea Giurgiu (C, P)	30	19	5	6	55	17	+38	43	Promotion to Divizia B
2	Unirea Tricolor București	30	15	10	5	53	33	+20	40	
3	Azotul Slobozia	30	17	4	9	54	41	+13	38	
4	Olimpia Giurgiu	30	14	4	12	39	36	+3	32	
5	Sirena București	30	8	15	7	39	36	+3	31	
6	Automatica București	30	11	9	10	38	36	+2	31	
7	Șoimii Tarom București	30	10	10	10	54	34	+20	30	
8	TMB București	30	11	8	11	49	41	+8	30	
9	Tehnometal București	30	12	6	12	31	36	−5	30	
10	Electronica Obor București	30	11	8	11	21	39	−18	30	
11	Triumf București	30	9	10	11	27	30	−3	28	
12	Flacăra Roșie București	30	9	10	11	35	46	−11	28	
13	IOR București	30	6	13	11	37	40	−3	25	
14	IPRECA Călărași	30	9	5	16	39	55	−16	23	
15	Voința Slobozia (R)	30	6	10	14	21	42	−21	22	Relegation to County Championship
16	Laromet București (R)	30	5	9	16	26	56	−30	19	Relegation to County Championship

Source: romaniansoccer.ro
(C) Champions; (P) Promoted; (R) Relegated

=== Seria VI ===
Pos	Team	Pld	W	D	L	GF	GA	GD	Pts	Promotion or relegation
1	Chimia Turnu Măgurele (C, P)	30	19	6	5	72	26	+46	44	Promotion to Divizia B
2	Rova Roșiori	30	16	8	6	51	30	+21	40	
3	Cetatea Turnu Măgurele	30	14	5	11	46	37	+9	33	
4	Chimistul Râmnicu Vâlcea	30	13	7	10	45	46	−1	33	
5	Recolta Stoicănești	30	13	6	11	32	39	−7	32	
6	Viitorul Scornicești	30	12	7	11	32	34	−2	31	
7	Vulturii Câmpulung	30	13	5	12	39	45	−6	31	
8	Oțelul Târgoviște	30	10	10	10	40	40	0	30	
9	Lotru Brezoi	30	14	2	14	51	53	−2	30	
10	Petrolul Târgoviște	30	12	5	13	42	42	0	29	
11	Unirea Drăgășani	30	12	5	13	37	48	−11	29	
12	Cimentul Fieni	30	12	4	14	45	47	−2	28	
13	Vagonul Caracal	30	11	4	15	45	41	+4	26	
14	Chimia Găești	30	9	8	13	42	43	−1	26	
15	Dacia Pitești (R)	30	10	6	14	38	43	−5	26	Relegation to County Championship
16	Textilistul Pitești (R)	30	4	4	22	21	64	−43	12	Relegation to County Championship

Source: romaniansoccer.ro
(C) Champions; (P) Promoted; (R) Relegated

=== Seria VII ===
Pos	Team	Pld	W	D	L	GF	GA	GD	Pts	Promotion or relegation
1	Minerul Motru (C, P)	30	20	3	7	60	22	+38	43	Promotion to Divizia B
2	Meva Drobeta-Turnu Severin	30	19	4	7	39	24	+15	42	
3	Minerul Lupeni	30	17	3	10	54	28	+26	37	
4	FOB Balș	30	17	1	12	50	44	+6	35	
5	Cimentul Târgu Jiu	30	14	4	12	49	31	+18	32	
6	Progresul Corabia	30	13	4	13	44	37	+7	30	
7	CFR Craiova	30	12	6	12	42	40	+2	30	
8	Progresul Băilești	30	13	3	14	36	36	0	29	
9	Dunărea Calafat	30	11	6	13	45	46	−1	28	
10	Metalurgistul Sadu	30	12	4	14	34	37	−3	28	
11	Dinamo Orșova	30	12	3	15	39	43	−4	27	
12	Minerul Rovinari	30	12	2	16	29	30	−1	26	
13	Victoria Craiova	30	10	6	14	27	39	−12	26	
14	CIL Drobeta-Turnu Severin	30	11	2	17	38	57	−19	24	
15	Progresul Strehaia (R)	30	10	4	16	31	60	−29	24	Relegation to County Championship
16	Steagul Roșu Plenița (R)	30	8	3	19	27	70	−43	19	Relegation to County Championship

Source: romaniansoccer.ro
(C) Champions; (P) Promoted; (R) Relegated

=== Seria VIII ===
Pos	Team	Pld	W	D	L	GF	GA	GD	Pts	Promotion or relegation
1	Unirea Tomnatic (C, P)	30	20	4	6	55	21	+34	44	Promotion to Divizia B
2	Metalul Oțelu Roșu	30	20	3	7	79	23	+56	43	
3	CFR Simeria	30	14	4	12	48	36	+12	32	
4	Constructorul Arad	30	12	8	10	39	34	+5	32	
5	Minerul Ghelar	30	12	7	11	51	35	+16	31	
6	Electromotor Timișoara	30	13	4	13	45	40	+5	30	
7	Unirea Sânnicolau Mare	30	12	6	12	35	38	−3	30	
8	Știința Petroșani	30	10	9	11	32	33	−1	29	
9	Ceramica Jimbolia	30	10	9	11	40	48	−8	29	
10	Minerul Teliuc	30	12	4	14	35	32	+3	28	
11	CFR Caransebeș	30	11	6	13	42	51	−9	28	
12	Strungul Arad	30	11	6	13	37	46	−9	28	
13	Minerul Oravița	30	9	10	11	32	42	−10	28	
14	Metalul Bocșa	30	13	1	16	45	44	+1	27	
15	Progresul Timișoara (R)	30	10	7	13	39	47	−8	27	Relegation to County Championship
16	Crișana Sebiș (R)	30	5	4	21	16	100	−84	14	Relegation to County Championship

Source: romaniansoccer.ro
(C) Champions; (P) Promoted; (R) Relegated

=== Seria IX ===
Pos	Team	Pld	W	D	L	GF	GA	GD	Pts	Promotion or relegation
1	Dacia Orăștie (C, P)	30	23	3	4	64	22	+42	49	Promotion to Divizia B
2	Olimpia Oradea	30	22	2	6	65	24	+41	46	
3	Voința Oradea	30	15	4	11	50	44	+6	34	
4	Aurul Brad	30	14	5	11	66	33	+33	33	
5	Minerul Dr.Petru Groza	30	14	4	12	56	43	+13	32	
6	Soda Ocna Mureș	30	13	5	12	40	38	+2	31	
7	Recolta Salonta	30	13	4	13	34	34	0	30	
8	Dermata Cluj-Napoca	30	11	7	12	34	28	+6	29	
9	Unirea Alba Iulia	30	13	3	14	41	49	−8	29	
10	Constructorul Alba Iulia	30	12	3	15	44	42	+2	27	
11	Textila Sebeș	30	10	6	14	32	59	−27	26	
12	CM Cluj-Napoca	30	9	7	14	37	40	−3	25	
13	CIL Blaj	30	11	2	17	41	63	−22	24	
14	Cimentul Turda	30	8	6	16	40	56	−16	22	
15	Arieșul Câmpia Turzii (R)	30	8	6	16	31	70	−39	22	Relegation to County Championship
16	Minaur Zlatna (R)	30	8	5	17	25	55	−30	21	Relegation to County Championship

Source: romaniansoccer.ro
(C) Champions; (P) Promoted; (R) Relegated

=== Seria X ===
Pos	Team	Pld	W	D	L	GF	GA	GD	Pts	Promotion or relegation
1	CIL Sighetu Marmației (C, P)	30	21	4	5	65	14	+51	46	Promotion to Divizia B
2	Minerul Cavnic	30	17	5	8	64	27	+37	39	
3	Armătura Zalău	30	16	6	8	50	27	+23	38	
4	Minerul Baia Borșa	30	14	5	11	52	36	+16	33	
5	Rapid Jibou	30	14	2	14	46	41	+5	30	
6	Bradul Vișeu de Sus	30	12	6	12	32	38	−6	30	
7	Bihoreana Marghita	30	11	7	12	44	35	+9	29	
8	Minerul Băița	30	12	5	13	49	45	+4	29	
9	Voința Carei	30	13	2	15	41	58	−17	28	
10	Someșul Satu Mare	30	12	3	15	52	60	−8	27	
11	Oașul Negrești-Oaș	30	12	3	15	39	53	−14	27	
12	Minerul Băiuț	30	10	7	13	38	54	−16	27	
13	Minerul Șuncuiuș	30	11	5	14	40	59	−19	27	
14	Cuprom Baia Mare	30	9	8	13	50	60	−10	26	
15	Unirea Tășnad (R)	30	10	5	15	36	58	−22	25	Relegation to County Championship
16	Victoria Zalău (R)	30	6	7	17	22	55	−33	19	Relegation to County Championship

Source: romaniansoccer.ro
(C) Champions; (P) Promoted; (R) Relegated

=== Seria XI ===
Pos	Team	Pld	W	D	L	GF	GA	GD	Pts	Promotion or relegation
1	Gloria Bistrița (C, P)	30	20	5	5	70	13	+57	45	Promotion to Divizia B
2	Unirea Dej	30	20	3	7	59	27	+32	43	
3	Viitorul Gheorgheni	30	18	0	12	69	47	+22	36	
4	Chimica Târnăveni	30	16	2	12	45	33	+12	34	
5	Metalul Copșa Mică	30	14	4	12	33	36	−3	32	
6	Minerul Rodna	30	11	7	12	43	45	−2	29	
7	Lacul Ursu Sovata	30	13	3	14	35	48	−13	29	
8	Miercurea Ciuc	30	13	2	15	47	41	+6	28	
9	CIL Gherla	30	11	6	13	37	36	+1	28	
10	Foresta Bistrița	30	12	4	14	30	36	−6	28	
11	Minerul Bălan	30	11	5	14	35	36	−1	27	
12	Vitrometan Mediaș	30	11	5	14	35	42	−7	27	
13	Avântul Reghin	30	12	3	15	35	51	−16	27	
14	CFR Sighișoara	30	11	5	14	25	41	−16	27	
15	Viitorul Târgu Mureș (R)	30	9	6	15	42	56	−14	24	Relegation to County Championship
16	Unirea Cristuru Secuiesc (R)	30	5	6	19	23	75	−52	16	Relegation to County Championship

Source: romaniansoccer.ro
(C) Champions; (P) Promoted; (R) Relegated

=== Seria XII ===
Pos	Team	Pld	W	D	L	GF	GA	GD	Pts	Promotion or relegation
1	Nitramonia Făgăraș (C, P)	30	17	8	5	79	27	+52	42	Promotion to Divizia B
2	Caraimanul Bușteni	30	16	3	11	56	41	+15	35	
3	Precizia Săcele	30	15	5	10	41	27	+14	35	
4	Torpedo Zărnești	30	14	6	10	44	29	+15	34	
5	ICIM Brașov	30	13	7	10	48	34	+14	33	
6	Chimia Victoria	30	14	5	11	43	30	+13	33	
7	UPA Sibiu	30	14	4	12	39	34	+5	32	
8	Progresul Odorheiu Secuiesc	30	12	6	12	37	30	+7	30	
9	Textila Cisnădie	30	13	3	14	50	49	+1	29	
10	Inter Sibiu	30	12	5	13	35	41	−6	29	
11	Forestierul Târgu Secuiesc	30	12	5	13	37	63	−26	29	
12	Unirea Sfântu Gheorghe	30	12	4	14	40	51	−11	28	
13	Carpați Brașov	30	9	9	12	40	35	+5	27	
14	Minerul Baraolt	30	11	4	15	43	65	−22	26	
15	Măgura Codlea (R)	30	11	4	15	33	57	−24	26	Relegation to County Championship
16	Carpați Covasna (R)	30	4	4	22	20	72	−52	12	Relegation to County Championship

Source: romaniansoccer.ro
(C) Champions; (P) Promoted; (R) Relegated

== See also ==
- 1974–75 Divizia A
- 1974–75 Divizia B
- 1974–75 County Championship
- 1974–75 Cupa României
