= 1975–76 Divizia B =

Divizia B
- Season: 1975–76
- Promoted: FCM Galați; Progresul București; Corvinul Hunedoara
- Relegated: CS Botoșani; Minerul Motru; Minerul Moldova Nouă; Cimentul Medgidia; Metalul Mija; Gaz Metan Mediaș; Viitorul Vaslui; Metrom Brașov; Victoria Carei; Tulcea; Autobuzul București; Unirea Tomnatic

The 1975–76 Divizia B was the 36th season of the second tier of the Romanian football league system.

The format has been maintained to three series, each of them having 18 teams. At the end of the season the winners of the series promoted to Divizia A and the last four places from each series relegated to Divizia C.

== Team changes ==
=== To Divizia B ===
Promoted from Divizia C

- CS Botoșani
- Viitorul Vaslui
- Prahova Ploiești
- Cimentul Medgidia
- Dunărea Giurgiu
- Chimia Turnu Măgurele
- Minerul Motru
- Unirea Tomnatic
- Dacia Orăștie
- CIL Sighetu Marmației
- Gloria Bistrița
- Nitramonia Făgăraș

Relegated from Divizia A

- Steagul Roșu Brașov
- Chimia Râmnicu Vâlcea
- FC Galați

=== From Divizia B ===
Relegated to Divizia C

- Foresta Fălticeni
- Flacăra Moreni
- Minerul Baia Sprie
- Chimia Brăila
- Metalul Turnu Severin
- Minerul Anina
- Oțelul Galați
- Oltul Sfântu Gheorghe
- Vulturii Textila Lugoj
- Relonul Săvinești
- CSU Brașov
- Metalul Aiud

Promoted to Divizia A

- SC Bacău
- Rapid București
- Bihor Oradea

=== Renamed teams ===
Arieșul Turda was renamed as Sticla Arieșul Turda.

Automatica Alexandria was renamed as Unirea Alexandria.

Dunărea Giurgiu was renamed as FCM Giurgiu.

FC Galați was renamed as FCM Galați.

Minerul Baia Mare was renamed as FC Baia Mare.

Progresul Brăila was renamed as FC Brăila.

=== Other teams ===
Știința Bacău and CAROM Onești merged, the first one being absorbed by the second one. After the merge, CAROM was moved to Borzești, a village (now part of Onești) and renamed as CSM Borzești.

Constructorul Galați and Victoria Tecuci merged, the first one being absorbed by the second one.

== League tables ==
=== Serie I ===
Pos	Team	Pld	W	D	L	GF	GA	GD	Pts	Promotion or relegation
1	FCM Galați (C, P)	34	22	6	6	67	25	+42	50	Promotion to Divizia A
2	FC Brăila	34	17	7	10	55	27	+28	41	
3	Petrolul Ploiești	34	13	12	9	56	36	+20	38	
4	CSU Galați	34	12	14	8	44	29	+15	38	Qualification to Cup Winners' Cup first round
5	CFR Pașcani	34	15	7	12	54	40	+14	37	
6	CSM Suceava	34	15	5	14	33	41	−8	35	
7	Prahova Ploiești	34	12	10	12	38	33	+5	34	
8	Gloria Buzău	34	13	7	14	45	38	+7	33	
9	Borzești	34	13	7	14	32	34	−2	33	
10	Victoria Tecuci	34	12	9	13	28	34	−6	33	
11	Celuloza Călărași	34	14	5	15	38	56	−18	33	
12	Metalul Plopeni	34	14	4	16	46	40	+6	32	
13	Ceahlăul Piatra Neamț	34	12	8	14	31	37	−6	32	
14	Unirea Focșani	34	14	4	16	32	43	−11	32	
15	CS Botoșani (R)	34	11	10	13	30	41	−11	32	Relegation to Divizia C
16	Cimentul Medgidia (R)	34	11	8	15	39	53	−14	30	Relegation to Divizia C
17	Viitorul Vaslui (R)	34	11	8	15	35	56	−21	30	Relegation to Divizia C
18	Tulcea (R)	34	5	9	20	23	63	−40	19	Relegation to Divizia C

Source: romaniansoccer.ro (in Romanian)
Rules for classification: 1) Points; 2) Goal difference; 3) Goals scored; 4) Head-to-head points; 5) Head-to-head goal difference; 6) Head-to-head goals scored; 7) Head-to-head away goals scored.
(C) Champions; (P) Promoted; (R) Relegated

=== Serie II ===
Pos	Team	Pld	W	D	L	GF	GA	GD	Pts	Promotion or relegation
1	Progresul București (C, P)	34	22	6	6	60	31	+29	50	Promotion to Divizia A
2	Dinamo Slatina	34	19	6	9	64	26	+38	44	
3	Steagul Roșu Brașov	34	18	7	9	52	30	+22	43	
4	CS Târgoviște	34	19	2	13	57	41	+16	40	
5	Electroputere Craiova	34	18	2	14	57	44	+13	38	
6	FCM Giurgiu	34	15	5	14	38	49	−11	35	
7	Tractorul Brașov	34	13	8	13	42	42	0	34	
8	Metalul București	34	13	8	13	37	38	−1	34	
9	Chimia Turnu Măgurele	34	14	6	14	35	47	−12	34	
10	Chimia Râmnicu Vâlcea	34	12	8	14	49	47	+2	32	
11	Nitramonia Făgăraș	34	13	6	15	44	50	−6	32	
12	Unirea Alexandria	34	11	10	13	27	33	−6	32	
13	SN Oltenița	34	13	6	15	36	51	−15	32	
14	Voința București	34	11	9	14	41	52	−11	31	
15	Minerul Motru (R)	34	12	6	16	42	42	0	30	Relegation to Divizia C
16	Metalul Mija (R)	34	11	6	17	44	60	−16	28	Relegation to Divizia C
17	Metrom Brașov (R)	34	10	4	20	33	45	−12	24	Relegation to Divizia C
18	Autobuzul București (R)	34	7	5	22	27	57	−30	19	Relegation to Divizia C

Source: romaniansoccer.ro (in Romanian)
Rules for classification: 1) Points; 2) Goal difference; 3) Goals scored; 4) Head-to-head points; 5) Head-to-head goal difference; 6) Head-to-head goals scored; 7) Head-to-head away goals scored.
(C) Champions; (P) Promoted; (R) Relegated

=== Serie III ===
Pos	Team	Pld	W	D	L	GF	GA	GD	Pts	Promotion or relegation
1	Corvinul Hunedoara (C, P)	34	23	5	6	61	23	+38	51	Promotion to Divizia A
2	Șoimii Sibiu	34	18	11	5	47	21	+26	47	
3	Baia Mare	34	17	5	12	46	31	+15	39	
4	Gloria Bistrița	34	16	5	13	54	34	+20	37	
5	CIL Sighetu Marmației	34	14	6	14	43	45	−2	34	
6	CFR Timișoara	34	14	6	14	40	45	−5	34	
7	Sticla Arieșul Turda	34	13	8	13	29	35	−6	34	
8	UM Timișoara	34	12	9	13	46	42	+4	33	
9	IS Câmpia Turzii	34	14	5	15	42	39	+3	33	
10	Victoria Călan	34	14	5	15	41	41	0	33	
11	Dacia Orăștie	34	13	7	14	30	31	−1	33	
12	Metalurgistul Cugir	34	15	3	16	33	46	−13	33	
13	Rapid Arad	34	14	5	15	33	48	−15	33	
14	Mureșul Deva	34	14	4	16	48	48	0	32	
15	Minerul Moldova Nouă (R)	34	14	4	16	42	47	−5	32	Relegation to Divizia C
16	Gaz Metan Mediaș (R)	34	12	7	15	44	39	+5	31	Relegation to Divizia C
17	Victoria Carei (R)	34	9	8	17	28	51	−23	26	Relegation to Divizia C
18	Unirea Tomnatic (R)	34	6	5	23	21	62	−41	17	Relegation to Divizia C

Source: romaniansoccer.ro (in Romanian)
Rules for classification: 1) Points; 2) Goal difference; 3) Goals scored; 4) Head-to-head points; 5) Head-to-head goal difference; 6) Head-to-head goals scored; 7) Head-to-head away goals scored.
(C) Champions; (P) Promoted; (R) Relegated

== See also ==
- 1975–76 Divizia A
- 1975–76 Divizia C
- 1975–76 County Championship
- 1975–76 Cupa României
