= 1974–75 County Championship =

33rd season of the Liga IV, the fourth tier of the Romanian football league

Liga IV
- Season: 1974–75

The 1974–75 County Championship was the 33rd season of the Liga IV, the fourth tier of the Romanian football league system. The champions of each county association play against one from a neighboring county in a play-off to gain promotion to Divizia C.

== County championships ==
- Alba (AB)
- Arad (AR)
- Argeș (AG)
- Bacău (BC)
- Bihor (BH)
- Bistrița-Năsăud (BN)
- Botoșani (BT)
- Brașov (BV)
- Brăila (BR)
- Bucharest (B)
- Buzău (BZ)
- Caraș-Severin (CS)
- Cluj (CJ)
- Constanța (CT)
- Covasna (CV)
- Dâmbovița (DB)
- Dolj (DJ)
- Galați (GL)
- Gorj (GJ)
- Harghita (HR)
- Hunedoara (HD)
- Ialomița (IL)
- Iași (IS)
- Ilfov (IF)
- Maramureș (MM)
- Mehedinți (MH)
- Mureș (MS)
- Neamț (NT)
- Olt (OT)
- Prahova (PH)
- Satu Mare (SM)
- Sălaj (SJ)
- Sibiu (SB)
- Suceava (SV)
- Teleorman (TR)
- Timiș (TM)
- Tulcea (TL)
- Vaslui (VS)
- Vâlcea (VL)
- Vrancea (VN)

== Promotion play-off ==
Teams promoted to Divizia C without a play-off matches as teams from less represented counties in the third division.

- (AG) Constructorul Pitești
- (IF) Avântul ICFT Urziceni
- (IS) Spicul Țigănași
- (TL) Minerul Măcin
- (CT) Gloria Murfatlar
- (SJ) Mobila Șimleu Silvaniei
- (VN) Foresta Gugești
- (BN) Progresul Năsăud

The matches were played on 13 and 20 July 1975.

Team 1	Agg.	Team 2	1st leg	2nd leg
Gloria Arad (AR)	4–2	(BH) Bihorul Beiuș	3–0	1–2
Autobuzul Cugir (AB)	3–4	(SB) IMIX Agnita	3–1	0–3
Constructorul Timișoara (TM)	3–0	(HD) Constructorul Hunedoara	2–0	1–0
Constructorul TCI Craiova (DJ)	10–1	(MH) TCI Drobeta-Turnu Severin	6–0	4–1
Constructorul Satu Mare (SM)	7–6	(MM) Lăpușul Târgu Lăpuș	2–0	5–6
Gloria Reșița (CS)	7–3	(GJ) Petrolul Țicleni	7–1	0–2
Tehnofrig Cluj-Napoca (CJ)	5–4	(MS) Mureșul Luduș	4–1	1–3
Carpați Nehoiu (BZ)	5–4	(BC) Petrolistul Dărmănești	4–1	1–3
Utilajul Făgăraș (BV)	3–0	(PH) IUC Ploiești	2–0	1–0
Petrolul Videle (TR)	0–2	(DB) Viitorul Titu	0–0	0–2
Victoria Lehliu (IL)	3–6	(B) ICSIM București	1–3	2–3
Cozia Călimănești (VL)	2–3	(OT) Voința Caracal	2–1	0–2
Mureșul Toplița (HR)	1–2	(CV) Metalul Târgu Secuiesc	2–0	0–4
Avântul Huși (VS)	1–4	(NT) Ozana Târgu Neamț	0–2	1–2
Unirea Săveni (BT)	1–7	(SV) Progresul Fălticeni	1–4	0–3
Autobuzul Făurei (BR)	–	(GL) Flamura Roșie Tecuci	–	–

== Championships standings ==
=== Arad County ===
Pos	Team	Pld	W	D	L	GF	GA	GD	Pts	Promotion or relegation
1	Gloria Arad (C, Q)	34	25	7	2	72	21	+51	57	Qualification to promotion play-off
2	Gloria Ineu	34	22	5	7	98	25	+73	49	
3	Victoria Ineu	34	22	5	7	68	29	+39	49	
4	Șoimii Lipova	34	20	4	10	79	44	+35	44	
5	Șoimii Pâncota	34	17	6	11	63	45	+18	40	
6	Foresta Arad	34	15	9	10	53	41	+12	39	
7	Victoria Chișineu-Criș	34	18	3	13	69	55	+14	39	
8	Frontiera Curtici	34	17	3	14	49	59	−10	37	
9	Unirea Șofronea	34	15	6	13	59	62	−3	36	
10	Progresul Pecica	34	13	7	14	54	53	+1	33	
11	Stăruința Dorobanți	34	10	12	12	46	42	+4	32	
12	Șiriana Șiria	34	11	6	17	52	72	−20	28	
13	Înfrățirea Iratoșu	34	12	3	19	44	55	−11	27	
14	FZ Arad	34	11	5	18	40	56	−16	27	
15	Foresta Beliu	34	12	3	19	49	79	−30	27	
16	Mureșul Arad	34	10	1	23	48	90	−42	21	
17	Libertatea Arad (R)	34	7	4	23	36	88	−52	18	Relegation to Arad County Championship II
18	Electrometal Lipova (R)	34	2	5	27	28	91	−63	9	Relegation to Arad County Championship II

Rules for classification: 1) Points; 2) Goal difference; 3) Number of goals scored.
(C) Champions; (Q) Qualified for the phase indicated; (R) Relegated

=== Bihor County ===
Pos	Team	Pld	W	D	L	GF	GA	GD	Pts	Qualification or relegation
1	Bihorul Beiuș (C, Q)	32	20	9	3	77	24	+53	49	Qualification to promotion play-off
2	Minerul Voivozi	32	22	1	9	66	31	+35	45	
3	Unirea Valea lui Mihai	32	20	5	7	63	29	+34	45	
4	Metalul Oradea	32	16	7	9	64	51	+13	39	
5	Înfrățirea Oradea	32	18	3	11	45	33	+12	39	
6	Forestierul Tileagd	32	17	4	11	63	44	+19	38	
7	Sticla Pădurea Neagră	32	15	6	11	54	41	+13	36	
8	Oțelul Bihor	32	14	6	12	55	39	+16	34	
9	CLA Aleșd	32	15	3	14	63	53	+10	33	
10	Dinamo Oradea	32	13	6	13	75	43	+32	32	
11	Biharea Vașcău	32	11	6	15	63	73	−10	28	
12	Recolta Diosig	32	11	3	18	46	74	−28	25	
13	Crișul Girișu de Criș	32	8	8	16	36	74	−38	24	
14	Petrolul Suplac	32	6	11	15	35	63	−28	23	
15	Fierarul Oradea	32	10	3	19	43	77	−34	23	
16	Stăruința Săcuieni	32	5	6	21	27	72	−45	16	
17	Crișana Tinca	32	5	5	22	35	93	−58	15	

Rules for classification: 1) Points; 2) Goal difference; 3) Number of goals scored.
(C) Champions; (Q) Qualified for the phase indicated

=== Botoșani County ===
Pos	Team	Pld	W	D	L	GF	GA	GD	Pts	Qualification or relegation
1	Unirea Săveni (C, Q)	22	18	3	1	80	23	+57	39	Qualification to promotion play-off
2	Siretul Bucecea	22	18	1	3	84	19	+65	37	
3	Metalul Botoșani	22	18	0	4	94	27	+67	36	
4	Spicul Iacobeni	22	10	5	7	47	39	+8	25	
5	Victoria Botoșani	22	10	2	10	39	41	−2	22	
6	Avîntul Mihai Eminescu	22	10	2	10	52	64	−12	22	
7	Sportivul Trușești	22	10	1	11	41	37	+4	21	
8	Sănătatea Darabani	22	10	1	11	51	76	−25	21	
9	Ceramica Dorohoi	22	6	3	13	42	72	−30	15	
10	Rapid Ungureni	22	5	2	15	24	50	−26	12	
11	Biruința Gorbănești	22	4	3	15	33	75	−42	11	
12	Victoria Nicolae Bălcescu	22	3	1	18	19	83	−64	7	
13	Gloria Frumușica (D)	0	0	0	0	0	0	0	0	Withdrew
14	Progresul Ștefănești (D)	0	0	0	0	0	0	0	0	Withdrew
15	Sănătatea Botoșani (D)	0	0	0	0	0	0	0	0	Withdrew
16	Constructorul Botoșani II (D)	0	0	0	0	0	0	0	0	Withdrew

Rules for classification: 1) Points; 2) Goal difference; 3) Number of goals scored.
(C) Champions; (D) Disqualified; (Q) Qualified for the phase indicated

=== Caraș-Severin County ===
Pos	Team	Pld	W	D	L	GF	GA	GD	Pts	Qualification or relegation
1	Gloria Reșița (C, Q)	32	25	3	4	116	29	+87	53	Qualification to promotion play-off
2	Nera Bozovici	32	20	4	8	87	36	+51	44	
3	CFR Oravița	32	19	2	11	90	58	+32	40	
4	Siderurgistul Reșița	32	17	6	9	69	43	+26	40	
5	Muncitorul Reșița	32	16	6	10	57	35	+22	38	
6	Minerul Ocna de Fier	32	16	4	12	64	45	+19	36	
7	Electrica Reșița	32	14	6	12	70	53	+17	34	
8	Victoria Caransebeș	32	14	4	14	65	53	+12	32	
9	Metalul Anina	32	13	3	16	60	64	−4	29	
10	Metalul Topleț	32	11	5	16	51	64	−13	27	
11	Energia Reșița	32	10	7	15	31	46	−15	27	
12	CPL Caransebeș	32	12	3	17	60	78	−18	27	
13	Foresta Zăvoi	32	12	3	17	60	88	−28	27	
14	ICM Caransebeș	32	12	3	17	51	79	−28	27	
15	Bistra Glimboca	32	10	3	19	34	79	−45	23	
16	Minerul Dognecea	32	10	2	20	43	114	−71	22	
17	Progresul Băile Herculane	32	6	6	20	31	75	−44	18	

Rules for classification: 1) Points; 2) Goal difference; 3) Number of goals scored.
(C) Champions; (Q) Qualified for the phase indicated

=== Harghita County ===
Pos	Team	Pld	W	D	L	GF	GA	GD	Pts	Qualification or relegation
1	Mureșul Toplița (C, Q)	28	25	2	1	116	10	+106	52	Qualification to promotion play-off
2	Explorarea Bălan	28	22	2	4	104	28	+76	46	
3	Flamura Roșie Sânsimion	28	18	3	7	94	37	+57	39	
4	Metalul Vlăhița	28	15	3	10	80	50	+30	33	
5	Bastionul Lăzarea	28	16	0	12	70	53	+17	32	
6	Harghita Cârța	28	15	2	11	52	44	+8	32	
7	Recolta Ditrău	28	11	6	11	35	36	−1	28	
8	Minerul Lueta	28	12	4	12	50	55	−5	28	
9	Apemin Borsec	28	12	4	12	51	61	−10	28	
10	Mureșul Suseni	28	12	1	15	42	54	−12	25	
11	Unirea Tulgheș	28	11	3	14	42	83	−41	25	
12	Complexul Gălăuțaș	28	10	2	16	40	50	−10	22	
13	Bradul Hodoșa	28	7	1	20	34	76	−42	15	
14	Rapid Ciceu (R)	28	3	2	23	15	77	−62	8	Relegation to Harghita County Championship II
15	Bucin Joseni (R)	28	3	1	24	19	129	−110	7	Relegation to Harghita County Championship II
16	Harghita Odorheiu Secuiesc (Note: Harghita Odorheiu Secuiesc withdrew in the first part of the season and all its results were canceled.) (D)	0	0	0	0	0	0	0	0	Withdrew

Rules for classification: 1) Points; 2) Goal difference; 3) Number of goals scored.
(C) Champions; (D) Disqualified; (Q) Qualified for the phase indicated; (R) Relegated

=== Iași County ===
Series I

Pos	Team	Pld	W	D	L	GF	GA	GD	Pts	Qualification or relegation
1	Șoimii Iași (Q)	22	18	0	4	82	27	+55	36	Qualification to championship play-off
2	Viitorul Târgu Frumos (Q)	22	13	5	4	62	29	+33	31	Qualification to championship play-off
3	Recolta Ruginoasa	22	13	5	4	63	31	+32	31	
4	Recolta Conțești	22	11	3	8	43	45	−2	25	
5	Voința Moțca	22	9	4	9	38	45	−7	22	
6	ITC Iași	22	8	5	9	41	38	+3	21	
7	Viitorul Hârlau	22	9	1	12	54	59	−5	19	
8	URA Iași	22	8	3	11	34	42	−8	19	
9	Olimpia Iași	22	7	4	11	36	46	−10	18	
10	Podgoria Cotnari	22	6	5	11	36	42	−6	17	
11	Avântul Todirești	22	7	0	15	44	68	−24	14	
12	Moldova Cristești	22	3	5	14	29	69	−40	11	

Rules for classification: 1) Points; 2) Goal difference; 3) Number of goals scored.
(Q) Qualified for the phase indicated

Series II

Pos	Team	Pld	W	D	L	GF	GA	GD	Pts	Qualification or relegation
1	Spicul Țigănași (Q)	22	19	2	1	61	9	+52	40	Qualification to championship play-off
2	Biruința Movileni (Q)	22	15	5	2	46	12	+34	35	Qualification to championship play-off
3	Recolta Podu Iloaiei	22	13	2	7	49	33	+16	28	
4	Moldova Tricotaje Iași	22	10	3	9	43	42	+1	23	
5	Chimia Iași	22	10	3	9	39	42	−3	23	
6	ASA Iași	22	9	4	9	55	45	+10	22	
7	Victoria TM Iași	22	9	3	10	43	37	+6	21	
8	Voința Bivolari	22	7	6	9	36	43	−7	20	
9	Mobila Iași	22	6	5	11	39	45	−6	17	
10	Prutul Prisăcani	22	5	3	14	34	52	−18	13	
11	Zorile Lungani	22	5	2	15	27	68	−41	12	
12	Luceafărul Vlădeni	22	3	4	15	40	75	−35	10	

Rules for classification: 1) Points; 2) Goal difference; 3) Number of goals scored.
(Q) Qualified for the phase indicated

Championship play-off

Pos	Team	Pld	W	D	L	GF	GA	GD	Pts	Qualification
1	Spicul Țigănași (C, Q)	3	2	0	1	9	6	+3	4	Qualification to promotion play-off
2	Șoimii Iași	3	2	0	1	8	6	+2	4	
3	Viitorul Târgu Frumos	3	1	1	1	3	5	−2	3	
4	Biruința Movileni	3	0	1	2	2	5	−3	1	

Rules for classification: 1) Points; 2) Goal difference; 3) Number of goals scored.
(C) Champions; (Q) Qualified for the phase indicated

=== Mureș County ===
Pos	Team	Pld	W	D	L	GF	GA	GD	Pts	Qualification or relegation
1	Mureșul Luduș (C, Q)	30	20	4	6	78	21	+57	44	Qualification to promotion play-off
2	Sticla Târnăveni	30	18	7	5	54	26	+28	43	
3	Viitorul Aluniș	30	17	2	11	55	46	+9	36	
4	Energia Iernut	30	15	4	11	58	34	+24	34	
5	Oțelul Reghin	30	15	4	11	58	34	+24	34	
6	Metalotehnica Târgu Mureș	30	16	2	12	47	30	+17	34	
7	Voința Miercurea Nirajului	30	13	7	10	38	34	+4	33	
8	Metalul Sighișoara	30	12	5	13	52	49	+3	29	
9	Lemnarul Târgu Mureș	30	10	8	12	40	38	+2	28	
10	Electromureș Târgu Mureș	30	10	6	14	35	48	−13	26	
11	Voința Sâncraiu de Mureș	30	10	6	14	30	43	−13	26	
12	Tractorul Sărmașu	30	12	2	16	31	45	−14	26	
13	Unirea Bahnea	30	11	3	16	33	72	−39	25	
14	Fabrica de Zahăr Târgu Mureș (R)	30	10	4	16	33	42	−9	24	Relegation to Mureș County Championship II
15	Dermagant Târgu Mureș (R)	30	8	4	18	33	64	−31	20	Relegation to Mureș County Championship II
16	ILEFOR Târgu Mureș (R)	30	6	6	18	27	76	−49	18	Relegation to Mureș County Championship II

Rules for classification: 1) Points; 2) Goal difference; 3) Number of goals scored.
(C) Champions; (Q) Qualified for the phase indicated; (R) Relegated

=== Neamț County ===
Pos	Team	Pld	W	D	L	GF	GA	GD	Pts	Qualification or relegation
1	Ozana Târgu Neamț (C, Q)	26	15	6	5	49	28	+21	36	Qualification to promotion play-off
2	Celuloza Piatra Neamț	26	13	7	6	78	48	+30	33	
3	Metalul Piatra Neamț	26	13	7	6	48	26	+22	33	
4	Azochim Săvinești	26	11	10	5	46	29	+17	32	
5	Vulturul Zănești	26	14	2	10	45	33	+12	30	
6	Voința Borlești	26	9	9	8	42	40	+2	27	
7	Volvatir Târgu Neamț	26	11	4	11	56	45	+11	26	
8	ITA Piatra Neamț	26	10	6	10	41	43	−2	26	
9	Industria Locală Piatra Neamț	26	9	7	10	40	45	−5	25	
10	Hârtia Piatra Neamț	26	8	6	12	41	41	0	22	
11	Spicul Tămășeni	26	9	3	14	37	51	−14	21	
12	Victoria Tarcău	26	6	7	13	41	56	−15	19	
13	Metalul Bicaz (Note: Metalul Bicaz was spared from relegation due to the promotion of Ozana Târgu Neamț in Divizia C.)	26	6	5	15	28	63	−35	17	Spared from relegation
14	Biruința Negrești (R)	26	6	5	15	23	67	−44	17	Relegation to Neamț County Championship II

Rules for classification: 1) Points; 2) Goal difference; 3) Number of goals scored.
(C) Champions; (Q) Qualified for the phase indicated; (R) Relegated

=== Prahova County ===
Pos	Team	Pld	W	D	L	GF	GA	GD	Pts	Qualification or relegation
1	IUC Ploiești (C, Q)	30	18	7	5	52	19	+33	43	Qualification to promotion play-off
2	Tricolorul Breaza	30	17	5	8	48	26	+22	39	
3	Dacia Ploiești	30	15	7	8	50	35	+15	37	
4	Viitorul Slănic	30	15	5	10	43	28	+15	35	
5	Flamura Roșie Dorobanțul Ploieşti	30	11	10	9	41	31	+10	32	
6	Electromotor Câmpina	30	13	5	12	48	40	+8	31	
7	Chimistul Valea Călugărească	30	12	7	11	40	38	+2	31	
8	Rapid Mizil	30	12	5	13	45	50	−5	29	
9	Geamuri Scăieni	30	12	3	15	34	43	−9	27	
10	Petrolul Băicoi	30	10	6	14	33	41	−8	26	
11	PECO Ploiești	30	9	8	13	29	38	−9	26	
12	Metalul Câmpina	30	9	8	13	31	41	−10	26	
13	Petrolul Urlați	30	10	6	14	33	45	−12	26	
14	Electrica Câmpina	30	10	5	15	34	50	−16	25	
15	Flacăra Câmpina (R)	30	10	4	16	29	40	−11	24	Relegation to Prahova County Championship II
16	Energia Vălenii de Munte (R)	30	8	7	15	26	51	−25	23	Relegation to Prahova County Championship II

Rules for classification: 1) Points; 2) Goal difference; 3) Number of goals scored.
(C) Champions; (Q) Qualified for the phase indicated; (R) Relegated

=== Sibiu County ===
Series I

Pos	Team	Pld	W	D	L	GF	GA	GD	Pts	Qualification or relegation
1	Construcții Sibiu (Q)	26	22	2	2	84	26	+58	46	Qualification to championship final
2	Metalul IO Sibiu	26	15	5	6	55	32	+23	35	
3	Metalurgica Sibiu	26	14	6	6	60	33	+27	34	
4	CFR Sibiu	26	13	5	8	57	34	+23	31	
5	Unirea Tălmaciu	26	14	2	10	37	41	−4	30	
6	Carpați Mârșa	26	11	6	9	68	49	+19	28	
7	Șantierul Sibiu	26	10	3	13	49	31	+18	23	
8	Unirea Ocna Sibiului	26	9	3	14	43	54	−11	21	
9	IT Sibiu	26	7	7	12	31	51	−20	21	
10	Electrica Sibiu	26	8	4	14	38	49	−11	20	
11	Sticla Avrig	26	6	8	12	30	65	−35	20	
12	Balanța Sibiu	26	6	6	14	25	57	−32	18	
13	Flamura Roșie Cârța	26	7	3	16	41	82	−41	17	
14	IRUM Sibiu	26	5	5	16	28	62	−34	15	

Rules for classification: 1) Points; 2) Goal difference; 3) Number of goals scored.
(Q) Qualified for the phase indicated

Series II

Pos	Team	Pld	W	D	L	GF	GA	GD	Pts	Qualification or relegation
1	IMIX Agnita (Q)	26	22	2	2	73	14	+59	46	Qualification to championship final
2	Automecanica Mediaș	26	21	2	3	37	15	+22	44	
3	Carbosin Copșa Mică	26	16	2	8	63	37	+26	34	
4	Record Mediaș	26	15	3	8	54	34	+20	33	
5	Textila Mediaș	26	14	4	8	53	25	+28	32	
6	ELCA Mediaș	26	13	3	10	48	29	+19	29	
7	Spicul Șeica Mare	26	12	4	10	60	54	+6	28	
8	Viitorul Târnava	26	11	3	12	57	64	−7	25	
9	Recolta Alma	26	11	0	15	45	47	−2	22	
10	Sparta Mediaș	26	9	3	14	32	40	−8	21	
11	Avântul Dârlos	26	9	0	17	25	55	−30	18	
12	Speranța Biertan	26	8	0	18	33	74	−41	16	
13	Recolta Moșna	26	7	0	19	30	70	−40	14	
14	Geamul Mediaș	26	0	0	26	14	122	−108	0	

Rules for classification: 1) Points; 2) Goal difference; 3) Number of goals scored.
(Q) Qualified for the phase indicated

Championship final

The match was played on 15 June 1975 at Șoimii Stadium in Sibiu.

Team 1	Score	Team 2
Construcții Sibiu	1–3 (a.e.t.)	IMIX Agnita

IMIX Agnita won the Sibiu County Championship and qualified for the promotion play-off in Divizia C.

== See also ==
- 1974–75 Divizia A
- 1974–75 Divizia B
- 1974–75 Divizia C
- 1974–75 Cupa României
