= FC Armătura Zalău =

Romanian football club

Armătura Zalău
- Full name: Fotbal Club Armătura Zalău
- Nickname(s): Zălăuanii (The people from Zalău)
- Short name: Armătura
- Founded: 1946 as CS Zalău
- Dissolved: 2005
- Ground: Municipal
- Capacity: 4.000
Home colours	Away colours

Fotbal Club Armătura Zalău, commonly known as Armătura Zalău, was a Romanian professional football club based in Zalău, Sălaj County. The club was founded in 1946 as CS Zalău and since 1975 was owned by IAIFO (Interprinderea de Armături Industriale din Fontă și Oțel - The Industrial Fittings Cast Iron and Steel Enterprise).

Armătura was the most representative football team of Zalău and Sălaj County, playing at the national level and at its best, in the second tier. Over time, notable players such as Mircea Bolba, Alin Chibulcutean, Claudiu Cornaci, Vasile Dobrău, Adrian Gongolea, Vasile Jula, Florin Sabou or Gabriel Vașvari wore the red and black kits of Armătura and managers such as Leontin Grozavu or Iosif Vigu, among others, led "the Steelworkes" from the technical bench.

== History ==
The club was founded in 1946 as Clubul Sportiv Zalău and played in the first postwar season of Divizia C, ranking 9th in the 6th series. Then, for twenty-two years, Zalău will no longer exceed the level of the regional and county championship.

The situation of Zalău football changes in 1969, when the Divizia C side Dinamo Oradea was moved at Zalău and renamed as Dinamo Zalău. The club managed to obtain the 14th place in the 7th series, of the 1969–70 season.

In the following years, after was renamed as Unirea in 1970, the club competitive performance will be as follows: 7th place (1970–71), 4th place (1971–72) and 11th place (1972–73).

In the spring of 1974, the club was renamed as CS Zalău and finished the 1973–74 season in 2nd place. ”Zalăuanii” confirmed the good form from the previous season finishing 3rd in the 1974–75 season.

In January 1975, the club was taken over by IAIFO (Interprinderea de Armături Industriale din Fontă și Oțel - The Industrial Fittings Cast Iron and Steel Enterprise) and under the guidance of Carol Călina finished the 1975–76 season in 1st place. The promotion squad in Divizia B was composed among others by: Mircea Cornaci, Mihai Bumbuț, Ioan Nistor, Ștefan Both, I. Antal, Ioan Fabian, Alexandru Munteanu, Gheorghe Bumbuț, Arpad Mathe, Andrei Vaida, Aurel Petreanu, C. Mureșan, Zoltan Ardeleanu, Francisc Feierstein.

Vasile Băluțiu was hired as the new head coach and important players such as Vasile Stâncel, Dorin Barbu, I. Pașcalău, Tiberiu Damian among others were transferred. Armătura occupied the 7th place in the third series at the end of 1976–77 season. Finished 16th in the following season with Emil Chirilă as head coach.

Four championships followed in third tier in which was ranked twice in 2nd place (1978–79 and 1979–80), 9th ( 1980–81) and 1st in 1981–82 season, promoting for the second time in Divizia B. The team coached by Ioan Cotruț consisted of the following players: Grigore Marian, M.Cornaci, Doruț Ghețe, M. Bumbuț, A.Petreanu, Emil Terheș, Gheorghe Terluș, Ciulean, Florin Pop, Grigore Pășcuță, Pasca, Vasile Cheregi, Eugen Crișan, Dumitru Crișan, Gh. Bumbuț, A.Vaida, Z.Ardeleanu, Ioan Chiș, Butan and Roman.

Returned to second division, Armătura played in the third series occupying the 5th place in the 1982–83 season and 4th place in the 1983–84 season, 6th in the 1984–85 season, 10th in the 1985–86 season, 8th 1986–87 season, 12th 1987–88 season, 10th in the 1988–89 season, 8th 1989–90 season, 8th in the 1990–91 season, 12th in the 1991–92 season, 14th 1992–93 season, 15th in the 1993–94 season and 18th in the 1994–95 season relegating after thirteen years in the second division.

In this period, "the Steelworkes" coaches Ioan Cotruț, Alexandru Constantinescu, Dorin Barbu, Vasile Stâncel, Iosif Vigu and Virgil Crăciunescu had the following players at his disposal: M.Lăzăreanu, M. Bumbuț, E. Terheș, Z.Ardeleanu, Vasiliu, A.Petreanu, Gyula Mathe, Gr.Pășcuță, Drăgan, Ioan Tașnadi, Ovidiu Darie, Radu Petruțiu, Moldovan, Stere, D.Crișan, Pop, V.Dobrău, Traian Bode, Gh. Bumbuț, Grigore Boca, Costel Nuțu, Romeo Predeanu, D.Ghețe, Gr.Marian, Zaha among others.

Armătura Zalău, coached by Florin Mureșan, promoted to Divizia B at the end of the 2002–03 season. The squad was composed of: Adrian Noțigan, Ovidiu Suciu, Petru Săraz, Sergiu Lonca, Alin Chibulcutean, Laurențiu Mândru, Cristian Vesa, Marius Muntean, Alexandru Pop, Cristian Mureșan, Ciprian Hădade, Grigore Molnar, Lucian Zoicaș, Cosmin Sabău, Cristian Oroș, Marius Cozma and Marian Ignat.

After the promotion, Leo Grozavu was appointed as the new head coach and in the first year it took the 7th place in the third series. In the 2004–05 season ranked 6th, and in the fall of 2005, Liviu Olar Pop, the main sponsor of the club, decided to withdraw its support and Armătura Zalău was disbanded after remaining without financial support from both the private sector and local authorities.

== Ground ==
Armătura played its home matches on Municipal Stadium in Zalău, with a capacity of 3,500 seats.

== Honours ==
Liga III

- Winners (3): 1975–76, 1981–82, 2002–03
- Runners-up (3): 1973–74, 1978–79, 1979–80

== League history ==
Season	Tier	Division	Place	Notes	Cupa României
2005–06	2	Divizia B (Seria III)	16th	Dissolved	
2004–05	2	Divizia B (Seria III)	6th		
2003–04	2	Divizia B (Seria III)	7th		

Season	Tier	Division	Place	Notes	Cupa României
2002–03	3	Divizia C (Seria VIII)	1st (C)	Promoted	
2001–02	3	Divizia C (Seria VIII)	5th		
2000–01	3	Divizia C (Seria VIII)	6th		
