= CS Gloria Reșița =

Romanian football club

Gloria Reșița
- Full name: Club Sportiv Gloria Reșița
- Nicknames: Reșițenii (The People from Reșița); Alb-Albaștrii (The White and Blues); Echipa din Govândari (The Team from Govândari)
- Short name: Gloria
- Founded: 1951
- Dissolved: 2014
- Ground: Gloria
- Capacity: 5,000
- 2012–13: Liga IV, Caraș-Severin, 8th
Home colours	Away colours

Club Sportiv Gloria Reșița, commonly known as CS Gloria Reșița, or simply as Gloria Reșița, was a Romanian professional football club based in Reșița, Caraș-Severin County. The club was originally established in 1951 and was the second most powerful club of the city, after CSM Reșița. Gloria was dissolved in 2014, due to lack of financing.

The "white and blues" have represented Govândari neighborhood of Reșița and had over time important rivalries with other local sides such as CSM Reșița or Muncitorul Reșița. Gloria was for most of its history a second and third-tier side, then during the 1990s achieved its best form (4th place) and was considered as a regular second division member, especially under the management of Victor Roșca.

== History ==
=== Reșița's second team (1951–1998) ===
CS Gloria Reșița was established in 1951, in the Govândari neighborhood of Reșița and its colors were white and blue. Gloria was for most of its life the second club as importance in the city, after CSM Reșița. The team based in Govândari promoted for the first time in the national competitions (Divizia C) at the end of the 1974–75 edition, period in which the football from the city was in one of its best moments, with CSM as a top-flight member since 1972. In the next six seasons, Gloria consolidated its position and obtained in generally top-table rankings: 4th (1975–76), 11th (1976–77), 8th (1977–78), 5th (1978–79), 4th (1979–80) and 8th (1980–81).

At the end of the 1981–82 season, Gloria won the 9th series of the Divizia C and promoted to Divizia B, for the first time in its history. During that season, Gloria won 18 matches, registered 3 ties and 9 loses, table line that resulted in a well deserved first place, with 2 points ahead of CFR Arad and 5 points ahead of Minerul Anina and Șoimii Lipova.

Since 1982, Gloria started to develop an interesting local rivalry against CSM Reșița, team that relegated in 1978 from the top-flight. At the end of the first season of second tier for Gloria, the team based in the Bârzava Meadow was ranked 10th, with two points behind CSM (7th), but also far away from the relegation zone. In the next two seasons, Gloria was ranked 13th (1983–84) and 17th (1984–85), while CSM was ranked 3rd in both seasons. The 17th ranking brought also the relegation for "the white and blues", but who would be promoted again in the summer of 1987, after winning the 7th series of the Divizia C with 1 point ahead of Minerul Motru.

The next 11 years was Gloria's most prolific period. "Reșițenii" fought for surviving in the first years after promotion, but then, during the 1990s CSM promoted in the first tier (with two occasions) and Gloria demonstrated that could be a very tough opponent at the level of the second tier, especially in the years in which the club was managed by its former player Victor Roșca. After the first two seasons, Gloria settled in the middle of the second division table and at the end of the 1990–91 edition achieved an unexpected 6th place. Since 1992, Roșca was named as the manager, appointment which coincided with CSM's promotion in the first league. With a top-flight team based in Reșița, Gloria had also much more opportunities to develop and at the end of the 1992–93 season, Govândari's team obtained its best ranking ever, 4th place.

=== The fall of Gloria (1998–2014) ===
In the next seasons, Gloria return to the middle of the table and after a tough battle for avoiding the relegation during the 1995–96 season, finally returned to the third tier in 1998, after a weak season, in which they were ranked 18th of 18. The season in which the team relegated after 11 years of constant presence at the level of Divizia B coincided with the departure of Victor Roșca, who was promoted as the manager of CSM Reșița in 1997. Gloria struggle to promote back, but instead of a promotion, Govândari's team relegated in the fourth tier at the end of the 2000–01 edition, for the first time in the last 26 years. The "white and blues" promoted again in 2004, but relegated after only one season.

During the 2000s, the football clubs based in Reșița, as the city itself, suffered important economic losses. Reșița was well known in Romania for its iron plants, TMK Reșița and UCM Reșița, plants went into financial difficulties during this period. The dissolution of the plants affected almost irreversible the city's economic life and thus the economical life of the football clubs. Local football rivalries in Reșița were interesting over time, but not as bitter as in other cities. In fact the clubs worked in a pyramidal system, with CSM Reșița as the top club (1st and 2nd tier), Gloria Reșița as the second club (2nd and 3rd tier) and Muncitorul Reșița as the third club (mainly in the 3rd tier). During the 2000s CSM was dissolved, the re-founded and in the early 2010s played in the fourth league, CSM's fall brought with it also the fall of Gloria and Muncitorul.

After a last season spent at the level of Liga III, during the 2011–12 edition, Gloria relegated back at county level, played another season, then the senior squad was dissolved. The youth teams played one more season, subsequently the club disappeared definitive in 2014.

== Ground ==
Gloria Reșița played its home matches on Gloria Stadium in Reșița, Caraș-Severin County. The stadium is located in the Govândari neighborhood and has a capacity of 5,000 people, the 2nd largest arena in Reșița and Caraș-Severin County, after Mircea Chivu Stadium.

Since 2014, the stadium was abandoned and reached an advanced state of degradation. In 2016, Municipality of Reșița came into possession of the stadium after a lawsuit with the Recons Company, the company which privatized one of the old plants, claiming the stadium as well. The Municipality of Reșița remedied the more serious problems and re-introduced the stadium in the football circuit, youth teams of CSM Reșița and other lower division clubs are playing here now.

== Honours ==
Liga III

- Winners (2): 1982–83, 1986–87
- Runners-up (1): 1985–86

Liga IV – Caraș-Severin County

- Winners (3): 1974–75, 2006–07, 2010–11
- Runners-up (3): 1973–74, 2002–03, 2003–04

=== Other performances ===
- Appearances in Liga II: 14
- Best finish in Liga II: 4th (1992–93)
- Best finish in Cupa României: Round of 32 (1974–75, 1977–78)

== Notable former players ==
The footballers enlisted below have had cap(s) for CS Gloria Reșița in the Liga II or matches played at the level of Liga I, considering that Gloria Reșița never achieved that level.

- (Romania) Dorin Arcanu
- (Romania) Marius Bălean
- (Romania) Gaia Beloia
- (Romania) Adrian Ciocan
- (Romania) Gheorghe Ciurea
- (Romania) Lavinius Copocean
- (Romania) Florin Dincă
- (Romania) Leontin Doană
- (Romania) Marcu Florescu
- (Romania) Laurențiu Furdui
- (Romania) Florin Ianu
- (Romania) Tiberiu Kapornyai
- (Romania) Árpád Laczkó
- (Romania) Lucian Manole
- (Romania) Alexandru Marcă
- (Romania) Ovidiu Panaitescu
- (Romania) Mihai Panc
- (Romania) Victor Roșca
- (Romania) Octavian Rus
- (Romania) Romeo Rus
- (Romania) Cătălin Toader
- (Romania) Mihail Tuluc
- (Romania) Gheorghe Zsizsik

== Former managers ==
- (Romania) Victor Roșca (1992–1996)
