= 1975–76 Divizia C =

Third tier Romanian football league

Divizia C
- Season: 1975–76

The 1975–76 Divizia C was the 20th season of Liga III, the third tier of the Romanian football league system.

== Team changes ==
=== To Divizia C ===
Relegated from Divizia B

- Foresta Fălticeni
- Chimia Brăila
- Oțelul Galați
- Relonul Săvinești
- Flacăra Moreni
- Metalul Drobeta-Turnu Severin
- Oltul Sfântu Gheorghe
- CSU Brașov
- Minerul Baia Sprie
- Minerul Anina
- Vulturii Textila Lugoj
- Metalul Aiud

Promoted from County Championship

- Progresul Fălticeni
- Spicul Țigănași
- Ozana Târgu Neamț
- Petrolistul Dărmănești
- Locomotiva Adjud
- Foresta Gugești
- Chimia Mărășești
- Carpați Nehoiu
- Autobuzul Făurei
- Gloria Murfatlar
- Minerul Măcin
- ICSIM București
- Avântul Urziceni
- Constructorul Pitești
- Electrica Titu
- Voința Caracal
- Constructorul TCI Craiova
- Gloria Reșița
- Constructorul Timișoara
- Gloria Arad
- Gloria Șimleu Silvaniei
- Constructorul Satu Mare
- Tehnofrig Cluj-Napoca
- Progresul Năsăud
- IMIX Agnita
- Utilajul Făgăraș
- Metalul Târgu Secuiesc

=== From Divizia C ===
Promoted to Divizia B

- CS Botoșani
- Viitorul Vaslui
- Prahova Ploiești
- Cimentul Medgidia
- Dunărea Giurgiu
- Chimia Turnu Măgurele
- Minerul Motru
- Unirea Tomnatic
- Dacia Orăștie
- CIL Sighetu Marmației
- Gloria Bistrița
- Nitramonia Făgăraș

Relegated to County Championship

- Sportul Muncitoresc Suceava
- Nicolina Iași
- Partizanul Bacău
- Constructorul Gheorghiu-Dej
- Dinamo Focșani
- Bujorii Târgu Bujor
- Tehnometal Galați
- Recolta Frecăței
- Voința Slobozia
- Laromet București
- Dacia Pitești
- Textilistul Pitești
- Progresul Strehaia
- Steagul Roșu Plenița
- Progresul Timișoara
- Crișana Sebiș
- Arieșul Câmpia Turzii
- Minaur Zlatna
- Unirea Tășnad
- Victoria Zalău
- Viitorul Târgu Mureș
- Unirea Cristuru Secuiesc
- Măgura Codlea
- Carpați Covasna

=== Renamed teams ===
Comerțul Brăila was renamed as Progresul Brăila.

Știința Constanța was renamed as Unirea Știința Eforie Nord.

Cimentul Târgu Jiu was renamed as Cimentul Victoria Târgu Jiu.

Dinamo Orșova was renamed as Dierna Orșova.

CIL Drobeta-Turnu Severin was renamed as Unirea Drobeta-Turnu Severin.

Olimpia Oradea merged with Dinamo Oradea and was renamed as Dinamo MIU Oradea.

CFR Sighișoara was renamed as Metalul Sighișoara.

=== Other changes ===
Oțelul Galați was disbanded.

Știința Bacău and Carom Onești merged, the first one being absorbed by the second one. After the merge, Carom was moved to Borzești, a village (now part of Onești), renamed as CSM Borzești and took the place in second division of Știința Bacău.

Constructorul Galați and Victoria Tecuci merged, the first one being absorbed by the second one. Third division club Victoria Tecuci therefore took Constructorul Galați place in the second division.

== League tables ==
=== Seria I ===
Pos	Team	Pld	W	D	L	GF	GA	GD	Pts	Promotion or relegation
1	Minerul Gura Humorului (C, P)	30	21	3	6	66	23	+43	45	Promotion to Divizia B
2	Laminorul Roman	30	18	4	8	61	23	+38	40	
3	ASA Câmpulung Moldovenesc	30	17	4	9	56	31	+25	38	
4	Constructorul Iași	30	15	4	11	51	32	+19	34	
5	Foresta Fălticeni	30	13	7	10	31	22	+9	33	
6	Metalul Rădăuți	30	15	2	13	48	50	−2	32	
7	Avântul Frasin	30	13	5	12	33	39	−6	31	
8	Danubiana Roman	30	12	6	12	45	44	+1	30	
9	Constructorul Botoșani	30	14	2	14	38	43	−5	30	
10	Dorna Vatra Dornei	30	11	7	12	40	49	−9	29	
11	Progresul Fălticeni	30	11	3	16	32	42	−10	25	
12	Spicul Țigănași	30	11	3	16	31	45	−14	25	
13	Cristalul Dorohoi	30	10	5	15	30	50	−20	25	
14	Victoria Roman	30	8	8	14	36	48	−12	24	
15	Foresta Moldovița (R)	30	8	7	15	25	58	−33	23	Relegation to County Championship
16	Metalurgistul Iași (R)	30	5	6	19	26	50	−24	16	Relegation to County Championship

(C) Champions; (P) Promoted; (R) Relegated

=== Seria II ===
Pos	Team	Pld	W	D	L	GF	GA	GD	Pts	Promotion or relegation
1	Relonul Săvinești (C, P)	30	25	2	3	90	13	+77	52	Promotion to Divizia B
2	Petrolul Moinești	30	25	2	3	74	15	+59	52	
3	Letea Bacău	30	20	4	6	90	24	+66	44	
4	Energia Gheorghiu-Dej	30	17	5	8	45	34	+11	39	
5	Constructorul Vaslui	30	16	6	8	56	29	+27	38	
6	Oituz Târgu Ocna	30	13	5	12	49	50	−1	31	
7	Minerul Comănești	30	14	2	14	50	42	+8	30	
8	Rulmentul Bârlad	30	13	4	13	51	42	+9	30	
9	Textila Buhuși	30	10	6	14	38	45	−7	26	
10	Bradul Roznov	30	8	8	14	25	44	−19	24	
11	Hușana Huși	30	9	5	16	27	54	−27	23	
12	Ozana Târgu Neamț	30	9	4	17	36	77	−41	22	
13	Cimentul Bicaz	30	8	3	19	30	52	−22	19	
14	Petrolistul Dărmănești	30	7	4	19	43	78	−35	18	
15	Locomotiva Adjud (R)	30	5	8	17	23	68	−45	18	Relegation to County Championship
16	Tractorul Văleni (Note: Tractorul Văleni was excluded from championship after 26 rounds.) (R)	30	6	2	22	30	90	−60	14	Relegation to County Championship

(C) Champions; (P) Promoted; (R) Relegated

=== Seria III ===
Pos	Team	Pld	W	D	L	GF	GA	GD	Pts	Promotion or relegation
1	Olimpia Râmnicu Sărat (C, P)	30	17	7	6	53	33	+20	41	Promotion to Divizia B
2	Carpați Sinaia	30	16	8	6	41	19	+22	40	
3	Poiana Câmpina	30	17	4	9	57	29	+28	38	
4	Caraimanul Bușteni	30	17	4	9	55	32	+23	38	
5	IRA Câmpina	30	15	5	10	39	26	+13	35	
6	Petrolul Teleajen Ploiești	30	14	6	10	40	27	+13	34	
7	Chimia Brazi	30	14	5	11	45	36	+9	33	
8	Foresta Gugești	30	11	6	13	43	46	−3	28	
9	Avântul Măneciu	30	11	6	13	38	47	−9	28	
10	Victoria Florești	30	10	7	13	37	42	−5	27	
11	Luceafărul Focșani	30	11	5	14	40	48	−8	27	
12	Petrolistul Boldești	30	11	5	14	32	40	−8	27	
13	Chimia Buzău	30	9	8	13	39	42	−3	26	
14	Chimia Mărășești	30	10	6	14	37	50	−13	26	
15	Petrolul Berca (R)	30	9	4	17	33	58	−25	22	Relegation to County Championship
16	Carpați Nehoiu (R)	30	4	2	24	19	73	−54	10	Relegation to County Championship

(C) Champions; (P) Promoted; (R) Relegated

=== Seria IV ===
Pos	Team	Pld	W	D	L	GF	GA	GD	Pts	Promotion or relegation
1	Portul Constanța (C, P)	30	21	5	4	65	19	+46	47	Promotion to Divizia B
2	Progresul Brăila	30	15	9	6	35	22	+13	39	
3	IMU Medgidia	30	14	8	8	36	21	+15	36	
4	Chimia Brăila	30	13	8	9	41	27	+14	34	
5	Viitorul Brăila	30	13	8	9	40	37	+3	34	
6	Unirea Știința Eforie Nord	30	10	13	7	42	31	+11	33	
7	Dunărea Tulcea	30	12	9	9	44	35	+9	33	
8	Electrica Constanța	30	9	12	9	39	27	+12	30	
9	Dunărea Cernavodă	30	12	6	12	56	49	+7	30	
10	Ancora Galați	30	10	8	12	33	33	0	28	
11	Autobuzul Făurei	30	11	6	13	32	42	−10	28	
12	Marina Mangalia	30	11	3	16	43	39	+4	25	
13	Gloria Murfatlar	30	8	7	15	23	41	−18	23	
14	Minerul Măcin	30	8	7	15	30	58	−28	23	
15	Granitul Babadag (R)	30	8	5	17	25	61	−36	21	Relegation to County Championship
16	Voința Constanța (R)	30	6	4	20	16	58	−42	16	Relegation to County Championship

(C) Champions; (P) Promoted; (R) Relegated

=== Seria V ===
Pos	Team	Pld	W	D	L	GF	GA	GD	Pts	Promotion or relegation
1	Tehnometal București (C, P)	30	17	8	5	55	25	+30	42	Promotion to Divizia B
2	Unirea Tricolor București	30	16	10	4	46	19	+27	42	
3	Azotul Slobozia	30	14	6	10	42	38	+4	34	
4	ICSIM București	30	10	12	8	37	31	+6	32	
5	Triumf București	30	11	9	10	34	31	+3	31	
6	TMB București	30	10	10	10	49	46	+3	30	
7	Șoimii Tarom București	30	11	7	12	45	34	+11	29	
8	Flacăra Roșie București	30	8	13	9	44	39	+5	29	
9	Automatica București	30	9	11	10	38	38	0	29	
10	IOR București	30	10	9	11	33	35	−2	29	
11	Avântul Urziceni	30	9	10	11	39	45	−6	28	
12	Electronica Obor București	30	11	5	14	28	33	−5	27	
13	Olimpia Giurgiu	30	9	9	12	36	43	−7	27	
14	Sirena București	30	8	10	12	37	45	−8	26	
15	IPRECA Călărași (R)	30	9	8	13	24	39	−15	26	Relegation to County Championship
16	Rapid Fetești (R)	30	6	7	17	31	77	−46	19	Relegation to County Championship

(C) Champions; (P) Promoted; (R) Relegated

=== Seria VI ===
Pos	Team	Pld	W	D	L	GF	GA	GD	Pts	Promotion or relegation
1	Flacăra-Automecanica Moreni (C, P)	30	21	7	2	65	17	+48	49	Promotion to Divizia B
2	Rova Roșiori	30	20	6	4	61	19	+42	46	
3	Vulturii Câmpulung	30	16	6	8	59	28	+31	38	
4	Viitorul Scornicești	30	14	7	9	61	31	+30	35	
5	Petrolul Târgoviște	30	12	7	11	41	27	+14	31	
6	FOB Balș	30	13	4	13	37	37	0	30	
7	Recolta Stoicănești	30	11	8	11	43	53	−10	30	
8	Constructorul Pitești	30	11	7	12	37	38	−1	29	
9	Chimia Găești	30	11	6	13	33	45	−12	28	
10	Progresul Corabia	30	12	3	15	39	51	−12	27 (Note: The match Voința Caracal – Progresul Corabia, from round 14, was lost by both teams with 0–3)	
11	Cimentul Fieni	30	10	7	13	32	46	−14	27	
12	Cetatea Turnu Măgurele	30	11	4	15	47	56	−9	26	
13	Oțelul Târgoviște	30	10	6	14	41	49	−8	26	
14	Vagonul Caracal	30	10	6	14	34	46	−12	26	
15	Electrica Titu (R)	30	10	6	14	31	48	−17	26	Relegation to County Championship
16	Voința Caracal (Note: Voința Caracal retired from the championship at the end of first part.) (R)	30	0	4	26	6	82	−76	4	Relegation to County Championship

(C) Champions; (P) Promoted; (R) Relegated

=== Seria VII ===
Pos	Team	Pld	W	D	L	GF	GA	GD	Pts	Promotion or relegation
1	Minerul Lupeni (C, P)	30	17	9	4	52	13	+39	43	Promotion to Divizia B
2	Cimentul Victoria Târgu Jiu	30	16	5	9	49	31	+18	37	
3	Metalurgistul Sadu	30	15	6	9	35	27	+8	36	
4	Lotru Brezoi	30	16	3	11	50	33	+17	35	
5	Metalul Drobeta-Turnu Severin	30	15	5	10	47	30	+17	35	
6	Progresul Băilești	30	14	6	10	52	36	+16	34	
7	Dierna Orșova	30	12	7	11	47	40	+7	31	
8	Chimistul Râmnicu Vâlcea	30	11	8	11	35	33	+2	30	
9	Dunărea Calafat	30	11	7	12	41	54	−13	29	
10	Meva Drobeta-Turnu Severin	30	11	5	14	38	44	−6	27	
11	Unirea Drăgășani	30	10	7	13	27	35	−8	27	
12	Constructorul TCI Craiova	30	11	5	14	39	55	−16	27	
13	CFR Craiova	30	9	7	14	29	47	−18	25	
14	Minerul Rovinari	30	8	7	15	27	38	−11	23	
15	Victoria Craiova (R)	30	7	8	15	29	55	−26	22	Relegation to County Championship
16	Unirea Drobeta-Turnu Severin (R)	30	7	5	18	37	63	−26	19	Relegation to County Championship

(C) Champions; (P) Promoted; (R) Relegated

=== Seria VIII ===
Pos	Team	Pld	W	D	L	GF	GA	GD	Pts	Promotion or relegation
1	Aurul Brad (C, P)	28	16	7	5	57	23	+34	39	Promotion to Divizia B
2	Minerul Anina	28	13	6	9	46	28	+18	32	
3	Vulturii Textila Lugoj	28	11	8	9	32	25	+7	30	
4	Gloria Reșița	28	14	2	12	47	43	+4	30	
5	Constructorul Timișoara	28	11	6	11	41	28	+13	28	
6	Ceramica Jimbolia	28	12	4	12	29	40	−11	28	
7	Minerul Ghelar	28	11	5	12	41	46	−5	27	
8	Unirea Sânnicolau Mare	28	12	3	13	35	45	−10	27	
9	Știința Petroșani	28	12	2	14	34	35	−1	26	
10	Electromotor Timișoara	28	10	6	12	31	34	−3	26	
11	Minerul Teliuc	28	12	2	14	33	38	−5	26	
12	Metalul Oțelu Roșu	28	10	6	12	38	51	−13	26	
13	CFR Simeria	28	11	3	14	39	38	+1	25	
14	Metalul Bocșa	28	10	5	13	46	54	−8	25	
15	CFR Caransebeș (R)	28	12	1	15	36	57	−21	25	Relegation to County Championship
16	Minerul Oravița (R)	0	0	0	0	0	0	0	0 (Note: Minerul Oravița was excluded from championship after the incidents from the match with Constructorul Timișoara (2–2, in round 8) and its results were canceled.)	Expelled

(C) Champions; (P) Promoted; (R) Relegated

=== Seria IX ===
Pos	Team	Pld	W	D	L	GF	GA	GD	Pts	Promotion or relegation
1	Armătura Zalău (C, P)	30	20	6	4	66	19	+47	46	Promotion to Divizia B
2	Strungul Arad	30	18	6	6	53	22	+31	42	
3	Constructorul Arad	30	16	6	8	56	29	+27	38	
4	Bihoreana Marghita	30	16	5	9	72	41	+31	37	
5	Recolta Salonta	30	14	9	7	42	38	+4	37	
6	Voința Oradea	30	15	4	11	54	43	+11	34	
7	Minerul Bihor	30	12	7	11	36	40	−4	31	
8	Someșul Satu Mare	30	11	8	11	41	29	+12	30	
9	Oașul Negrești	30	12	4	14	47	43	+4	28	
10	Dinamo MIU Oradea	30	10	7	13	35	41	−6	27	
11	Gloria Arad	30	10	6	14	37	49	−12	26	
12	Minerul Șuncuiuș	30	8	9	13	30	47	−17	25	
13	Gloria Șimleu Silvaniei	30	10	5	15	35	68	−33	25	
14	Voința Carei	30	7	10	13	33	58	−25	24	
15	Rapid Jibou (R)	30	8	5	17	44	53	−9	21	Relegation to County Championship
16	Constructorul Satu Mare (R)	30	3	3	24	24	85	−61	9	Relegation to County Championship

(C) Champions; (P) Promoted; (R) Relegated

=== Seria X ===
Pos	Team	Pld	W	D	L	GF	GA	GD	Pts	Promotion or relegation
1	Minerul Cavnic (C, P)	30	20	4	6	67	31	+36	44	Promotion to Divizia B
2	Unirea Dej	30	16	6	8	51	28	+23	38	
3	Minerul Rodna	30	15	4	11	60	43	+17	34	
4	Cuprom Baia Mare	30	14	6	10	54	37	+17	34	
5	Dermata Cluj-Napoca	30	12	8	10	48	41	+7	32	
6	Minerul Baia Sprie	30	11	9	10	50	34	+16	31	
7	CIL Gherla	30	11	9	10	52	40	+12	31	
8	Foresta Bistrița	30	13	4	13	43	40	+3	30	
9	Minerul Băiuț	30	14	2	14	50	67	−17	30	
10	Minerul Borșa	30	12	5	13	35	48	−13	29	
11	Tehnofrig Cluj-Napoca	30	10	8	12	39	40	−1	28	
12	Bradul Vișeu de Sus	30	12	4	14	39	52	−13	28	
13	Cimentul Turda	30	9	8	13	41	46	−5	26	
14	Minerul Băița	30	11	3	16	46	57	−11	25	
15	CM Cluj-Napoca (R)	30	9	6	15	36	44	−8	24	Relegation to County Championship
16	Progresul Năsăud (R)	30	5	6	19	22	85	−63	16	Relegation to County Championship

(C) Champions; (P) Promoted; (R) Relegated

=== Seria XI ===
Pos	Team	Pld	W	D	L	GF	GA	GD	Pts	Promotion or relegation
1	Chimica Târnăveni (C, P)	30	21	6	3	74	9	+65	48	Promotion to Divizia B
2	Metalul Aiud	30	22	4	4	82	18	+64	48	
3	Unirea Alba Iulia	30	18	4	8	45	37	+8	40	
4	Inter Sibiu	30	16	5	9	51	27	+24	37	
5	Textila Cisnădie	30	14	4	12	51	45	+6	32	
6	Metalul Copșa Mică	30	13	6	11	42	40	+2	32	
7	UPA Sibiu	30	12	7	11	41	38	+3	31	
8	Metalul Sighișoara	30	12	5	13	47	37	+10	29	
9	Constructorul Alba Iulia	30	13	3	14	39	44	−5	29	
10	CIL Blaj	30	10	8	12	48	47	+1	28	
11	Soda Ocna Mureș	30	12	3	15	39	38	+1	27	
12	Avântul Reghin	30	10	4	16	38	38	0	24	
13	IMIX Agnita	30	8	5	17	36	59	−23	21	
14	Textila Sebeș	30	8	4	18	25	81	−56	20	
15	Vitrometan Mediaș (R)	30	8	3	19	25	57	−32	19	Relegation to County Championship
16	Lacul Ursu Sovata (R)	30	7	1	22	22	90	−68	15	Relegation to County Championship

(C) Champions; (P) Promoted; (R) Relegated

=== Seria XII ===
Pos	Team	Pld	W	D	L	GF	GA	GD	Pts	Promotion or relegation
1	Oltul Sfântu Gheorghe (C, P)	30	17	8	5	54	20	+34	42	Promotion to Divizia B
2	Progresul Odorheiu Secuiesc	30	16	6	8	60	27	+33	38	
3	Viitorul Gheorgheni	30	17	4	9	45	29	+16	38	
4	CSU Brașov	30	15	7	8	46	28	+18	37	
5	ICIM Brașov	30	12	7	11	53	40	+13	31	
6	Carpați Brașov	30	11	8	11	34	29	+5	30	
7	Unirea Sfântu Gheorghe	30	11	8	11	40	39	+1	30	
8	Chimia Orașul Victoria	30	10	9	11	32	33	−1	29	
9	Minerul Baraolt	30	13	3	14	35	50	−15	29	
10	Precizia Săcele	30	11	6	13	30	36	−6	28	
11	Torpedo Zărnești	30	8	10	12	28	36	−8	26	
12	Utilajul Făgăraș	30	11	4	15	36	50	−14	26	
13	Forestierul Târgu Secuiesc	30	10	6	14	26	48	−22	26	
14	Minerul Bălan	30	9	7	14	35	46	−11	25	
15	Miercurea Ciuc (R)	30	10	5	15	33	45	−12	25	Relegation to County Championship
16	Metalul Târgu Secuiesc (R)	30	7	6	17	24	55	−31	20	Relegation to County Championship

(C) Champions; (P) Promoted; (R) Relegated

== See also ==
- 1975–76 Divizia A
- 1975–76 Divizia B
- 1975–76 County Championship
- 1975–76 Cupa României
