= ACS Cristalul Cavnic =

Cristalul Cavnic
- Full name: Asociația Club Sportiv; Cristalul Cavnic
- Nickname: Minerii (The Miners)
- Short name: Cavnic
- Founded: 1934; 92 years ago as Minerul Cavnic; 2001; 25 years ago (refounded); 2024; 2 years ago as Cristalul Cavnic
- Ground: Pintea Viteazul
- Capacity: 1,000
- Owner: Cavnic Town
- Manager: Nicolae Rai
- 2024–25: Liga IV, Maramureș County, 8th of 17 (withdrew)
Home colours	Away colours

Asociația Club Sportiv Cristalul Cavnic, commonly known as Cristalul Cavnic or simply as Cavnic, is a Romanian football club based in Cavnic, Maramureș County, founded in 1934, re-founded in 2001 and 2024. During the 1970s and 1980s, financially supported by the mining industry, the club was a constant presence in the Divizia C and at its best, reached even the Divizia B.

== History ==
Minerul Cavnic former logo

Founded in 1934, Minerul Cavnic represented the non-ferrous ore mining enterprise in Cavnic and competed in the district, regional, and county championships. At the end of the 1970–71 season, the Miners earned promotion to Divizia C, the third tier of Romanian football, after winning the Maramureș County Championship under head coach Ștefan Mezei, with standout players including Daubner, Ciutacu, Görög, Imre, Blaj, Csor, and Lachner.

After only two seasons, Minerul Cavnic gained the promotion to Divizia B, finishing the 1972–73 season on the second place, which assured a second division place in the next season. After relegating at the end of the season, Minerul won the promotion back in 1976, but relegated again.

The team established itself as a Divizia B regular after the 1977–78 season, when Minerul promoted for the third time in the second division and managed to avoid relegation back to Divizia C for the first time. After this third promotion, Minerul played nine consecutive editions in the second division, finishing two times on the sixth position, their all-time best performance.

The team relegated at the end of 1986–87 season, returned again after just one season to the second division, but then relegated to Divizia C. Minerul played in the third tier until 1996, when the team relegated in Divizia D. Since then, the team plays in the fourth division.

In the summer of 2024, the team was re-founded under the name of Cristalul Cavnic and was enrolled in the 4th tier.

== Honours ==
=== Leagues ===
Liga III

- Winners (4): 1975–76, 1977–78, 1987–88, 1990–91
- Runners-up (2): 1972–73, 1974–75

Liga IV – Maramureș County

- Winners (1): 1970–71

=== Other performances ===
- Appearances in Liga II: 13
- Best finish in Liga II: 6th (1979–80, 1982–83)
- Appearances in Liga III: 12
