= Liga IV Galați =

Fourth tier Romanian football league

- Founded: 1968
- Country: Romania
- Level on pyramid: 4
- Promotion to: Liga III
- Relegation to: Liga V Galați
- Domestic cup: Cupa României – County phase
- Current champions: Gloria Ivești (3rd title) (2025–26)
- Most championships: Victoria Galați (5 titles)
- Website: frf-ajf.ro/galati
- Current: 2025–26 Liga IV Galați

Liga IV Galați is one of the regional football divisions of Liga IV, the fourth tier of the Romanian football league system, for clubs based in Galați County, and is organized by AJF Galați – Asociația Județeană de Fotbal (lit. 'County Football Association').

It is contested by a variable number of teams, depending on the number of teams relegated from Liga III, the number of teams promoted from Liga V Galați, and the teams that withdraw or enter the competition. The winner may or may not be promoted to Liga III, depending on the result of a promotion play-off contested against the winner of a neighboring county series.

== History ==
Football arrived in Galați around 1908, brought by foreign commercial companies and the efforts of Officer Vladovici, a career officer who had studied in France. The first matches involved military teams, such as the one from the 3rd Heavy Artillery Regiment founded by Vladovici, which played against the English sailors stationed in the port. A year later, the Cavalry Regiment from Galați established a second team from the city, and this facilitated the organization of more football matches in Galați. In 1919, students from Vasile Alecsandri High School formed a team, Liceul Vasile Alecsandri (LVA), followed in 1920 by Olimpia and Niki, formed by immigrants from Turkey, Greece, and Armenia. As football grew in popularity, inter-city matches with Brăila, Tulcea, and Reni became more common, alongside local games between Internaționala, Niki, Olimpia, Șoimii Dacia, Atlas, and LVA.

In 1922, Șoimii Dacia and LVA merged to form Dacia Vasile Alecsandri Galați (DVA), which soon became one of the region’s strongest teams. More clubs emerged, including Maccabi, Aviația, Școala Comercială, Sportul, and Baza Navală. The first regional championship took place in 1926, featuring ten teams from Galați (including the neighborhood teams Șoimii and Gloria), two from Reni (Maccabi and Dunărea), and one from Tulcea. DVA was crowned the inaugural champion. However, economic hardships in the late 1920s led to the dissolution of many clubs, leaving only DVA, Gloria, and Șoimii active.

In 1927, Gloria and Șoimii merged as Gloria Șoimii, and in 1932, they joined CFR Galați to establish Gloria CFR Galați, backed by railroad workers. Gloria CFR quickly established itself as a key competitor in the Lower Danube District Championship, facing experienced teams such as DVA, Ermis, Marina Danubiană, and Unirea Tulcea. In the 1934–35 season, Gloria CFR won the district title, securing its place in Galați’s football history after earning promotion to Divizia C.

In 1968, following the new administrative and territorial reorganization of the country, each county established its own football championship, integrating teams from the former regional championships as well as those that had previously competed in town and rayon level competitions. The freshly formed Galați County Championship was placed under the authority of the newly created Consiliul Județean pentru Educație Fizică și Sport (lit. 'County Council for Physical Education and Sports') in Galați County.

Since then, the structure and organization of Liga IV Galați, like those of other county championships, have undergone numerous changes. Between 1968 and 1992, the main county competition was known as the Campionatul Județean (County Championship). Between 1992 and 1997, it was renamed Divizia C – Faza Județeană (Divizia C – County Phase), followed by Divizia D starting in 1997, and since 2006, it has been known as Liga IV.

== Promotion ==
The champions of each county association play against one another in a play-off to earn promotion to Liga III. Geographical criteria are taken into consideration when the play-offs are drawn. In total, there are 41 county champions plus the Bucharest municipal champion.

== List of Champions ==
=== Galați Regional Championship ===
Ed.	Season	Winners
1	1951	Metalul Brăila
2	1952	Metalul Brăila
3	1953	Dinamo Galați
4	1954	Locomotiva Galați
5	1955	
6	1956	Energia Metalul Galați
7	1957–58	Industria Sârmei Brăila
8	1958–59	Marina Brăila
9	1959–60	CSM Brăila
10	1960–61	Știința Galați
11	1961–62	Flamura Roșie Tecuci
12	1962–63	Metalosport Galați
13	1963–64	Constructorul Brăila
14	1964–65	Ancora Galați
15	1965–66	Ancora Galați
16	1966–67	SUT Galați
17	1967–68	Chimia Mărășești

=== Galați County Championship ===
Ed.	Season	Winners
County Championship
1	1968–69	Unirea ITO Galați
2	1969–70	Dacia Galați
3	1970–71	Gloria Tecuci
4	1971–72	Metalosport Galați
5	1972–73	Tehnometal Galați
6	1973–74	Mecanizatorul Târgu Bujor
7	1974–75	Victoria Tecuci
8	1975–76	Metalosport Galați
9	1976–77	Oțelul Galați
10	1977–78	Metalosport Galați
11	1978–79	Recolta Tudor Vladimirescu
12	1979–80	Avântul Matca
13	1980–81	Gloria Galați
14	1981–82	DVA Portul Galați
15	1982–83	Victoria TC Galați
16	1983–84	Avântul Matca
17	1984–85	Gloria Ivești
18	1985–86	Gloria Galați
19	1986–87	Avântul Liești
20	1987–88	Mecanosport Galați
21	1988–89	Gloria Ivești
22	1989–90	Metalurgistul Tecuci
23	1990–91	Șantierul Naval Galați
24	1991–92	Hidraulica Galați
Divizia C – County phase
25	1992–93	Dunărea Romport Galați
26	1993–94	Victoria IUG Galați
27	1994–95	Șantierul Naval Galați
28	1995–96	Metalul Toflea
29	1996–97	Victoria IUG Galați
Divizia D
30	1997–98	Avântul Liești
31	1998–99	Șantierul Naval Galați
32	1999–00	Viitorul Costache Negri
33	2000–01	Ancora Galați
34	2001–02	Victoria TC Galați
35	2002–03	Viitorul Costache Negri
36	2003–04	Junkers Galați
37	2004–05	Politehnica Galați
38	2005–06	Sporting Tecuci

Ed.	Season	Winners
Liga IV
39	2006–07	Bujorii Târgu Bujor
40	2007–08	Sporting Tecuci
41	2008–09	Dunărea Galați II
42	2009–10	Avântul Vânători
43	2010–11	Metalul Toflea
44	2011–12	Sporting Liești
45	2012–13	Sporting Liești
46	2013–14	Metalosport Galați
47	2014–15	Avântul Valea Mărului
48	2015–16	Avântul Valea Mărului
49	2016–17	Oțelul Galați
50	2017–18	CSU Galați
51	2018–19	CSU Galați
52	2019–20	Avântul Valea Mărului
–	2020–21	Not disputed (Note: Not disputed due to COVID-19 pandemic in Romania.)
53	2021–22	Unirea Braniștea
54	2022–23	Voința Cudalbi
55	2023–24	Voința Cudalbi
56	2024–25	Voința Cudalbi
57	2025–26	Gloria Ivești

== See also ==
=== Main Leagues ===
- Liga I
- Liga II
- Liga III
- Liga IV

=== County Leagues (Liga IV series) ===
North–East

- Liga IV Bacău
- Liga IV Botoșani
- Liga IV Iași
- Liga IV Neamț
- Liga IV Suceava
- Liga IV Vaslui

North–West

- Liga IV Bihor
- Liga IV Bistrița-Năsăud
- Liga IV Cluj
- Liga IV Maramureș
- Liga IV Satu Mare
- Liga IV Sălaj

Center

- Liga IV Alba
- Liga IV Brașov
- Liga IV Covasna
- Liga IV Harghita
- Liga IV Mureș
- Liga IV Sibiu

West

- Liga IV Arad
- Liga IV Caraș-Severin
- Liga IV Gorj
- Liga IV Hunedoara
- Liga IV Mehedinți
- Liga IV Timiș

South–West

- Liga IV Argeș
- Liga IV Dâmbovița
- Liga IV Dolj
- Liga IV Olt
- Liga IV Teleorman
- Liga IV Vâlcea

South

- Liga IV Bucharest
- Liga IV Călărași
- Liga IV Giurgiu
- Liga IV Ialomița
- Liga IV Ilfov
- Liga IV Prahova

South–East

- Liga IV Brăila
- Liga IV Buzău
- Liga IV Constanța
- Liga IV Galați
- Liga IV Tulcea
- Liga IV Vrancea
