= Liga IV Maramureș =

Fourth tier Romanian football league

- Founded: 1968
- Country: Romania
- Level on pyramid: 4
- Promotion to: Liga III
- Relegation to: Liga V Maramureș
- Domestic cup: Cupa României – County phase
- Current champions: Academica Recea (5th title) (2025–26)
- Most championships: Sighetu Marmaţiei (7 titles)
- Website: frf-ajf.ro/maramures
- Current: 2025–26 Liga IV Maramureș

Liga IV Maramureș is one of the regional football divisions of Liga IV, the fourth tier of the Romanian football league system, for clubs based in Maramureș County, and is organized by AJF Maramureș – Asociația Județeană de Fotbal (lit. 'County Football Association').

It is contested by a variable number of teams, depending on the number of teams relegated from Liga III, the number of teams promoted from Liga V Maramureș, and the teams that withdraw or enter the competition. The winner may or may not be promoted to Liga III, depending on the result of a promotion play-off contested against the winner of a neighboring county series.

== History ==
In 1968, following the new administrative and territorial reorganization of the country, each county established its own football championship, integrating teams from the former regional championships as well as those that had previously competed in town and rayon level competitions. The freshly formed Maramureș County Championship was placed under the authority of the newly created Consiliul Județean pentru Educație Fizică și Sport (lit. 'County Council for Physical Education and Sports') in Maramureș County.

Since then, the structure and organization of Liga IV Maramureș, like those of other county championships, have undergone numerous changes. Between 1968 and 1992, the main county competition was known as the Campionatul Județean (County Championship). Between 1992 and 1997, it was renamed Divizia C – Faza Județeană (Divizia C – County Phase), followed by Divizia D starting in 1997, and since 2006, it has been known as Liga IV.

== Promotion ==
The champions of each county association play against one another in a play-off to earn promotion to Liga III. Geographical criteria are taken into consideration when the play-offs are drawn. In total, there are 41 county champions plus the Bucharest municipal champion.

== List of Champions ==
=== Maramureș Regional Championship ===
Ed.	Season	Winners
Baia Mare Regional Championship
1	1951	Metalul Satu Mare
2	1952	Avântul Sighetu Marmației
3	1953	Avântul Sighetu Marmației
4	1954	Metalul Satu Mare
5	1955	Recolta Carei
6	1956	Dinamo Baia Mare
7	1957–58	Stăruința Satu Mare
8	1958–59	Minerul Baia Sprie
9	1959–60	Dinamo Săsar
Maramureș Regional Championship
10	1960–61	Voința Satu Mare
11	1961–62	Minerul Baia Sprie
12	1962–63	Minerul Baia Sprie
13	1963–64	Forestiera Sighetu Marmației
14	1964–65	Unio Satu Mare
15	1965–66	Topitorul Baia Mare
16	1966–67	Unio Satu Mare
17	1967–68	Topitorul Baia Mare

=== Maramureș County Championship ===
Ed.	Season	Winners
County Championship
1	1968–69	Chimistul Baia Mare
2	1969–70	Minerul Baia Sprie
3	1970–71	Minerul Cavnic
4	1971–72	Minerul Baia Borșa
5	1972–73	Gloria Baia Mare
6	1973–74	Minerul Băiuț
7	1974–75	Lăpușul Târgu Lăpuș
8	1975–76	Lăpușul Târgu Lăpuș
9	1976–77	Minerul Ilba-Seini
10	1977–78	Minerul Baia Borșa
11	1978–79	Simared Baia Mare
12	1979–80	Minerul Baia Borșa
13	1980–81	Bradul Vișeu de Sus
14	1981–82	IS Sighetu Marmației
15	1982–83	Simared Baia Mare
16	1983–84	IS Sighetu Marmației
17	1984–85	Recolta Rozavlea
18	1985–86	Minerul Baia Borșa
19	1986–87	Cuprom Baia Mare
20	1987–88	Bradul Vișeu de Sus
21	1988–89	Voința Târgu Lăpuș
22	1989–90	Unirea Seini
23	1990–91	Minerul Băiuț
24	1991–92	Viitorul Ocna Șugatag
Divizia C – County phase
25	1992–93	Avântul Bârsana
26	1993–94	Viitorul Darcadia Coltău
27	1994–95	Minerul Borșa
28	1995–96	Minerul Baia Sprie
29	1996–97	Progresul Șomcuta Mare
Divizia D
30	1997–98	Progresul Șomcuta Mare
31	1998–99	Progresul Șomcuta Mare
32	1999–00	Lăpușul Târgu Lăpuș
33	2000–01	Marmația Sighetu Marmației
34	2001–02	Plastunion Satulung
35	2002–03	Gloria Renel Baia Mare
36	2003–04	Suciu de Sus
37	2004–05	Marmația Sighetu Marmației
38	2005–06	Marmația Sighetu Marmației II

Ed.	Season	Winners
Liga IV
39	2006–07	Marmația Sighetu Marmației
40	2007–08	Spicul Mocira
41	2008–09	Someșul Ulmeni
42	2009–10	Spicul Mocira
43	2010–11	Marmația Sighetu Marmației
44	2011–12	Plimob Sighetu Marmației
45	2012–13	Baia Mare
46	2013–14	Sighetu Marmației
47	2014–15	Comuna Recea
48	2015–16	Viitorul Ulmeni
49	2016–17	Lăpușul Târgu Lăpuș
50	2017–18	Minaur Baia Mare
51	2018–19	Viitorul Ulmeni
52	2019–20	Progresul Șomcuta Mare
53	2020–21	Sighetu Marmației
54	2021–22	Sighetu Marmației
55	2022–23	Academica Recea
56	2023–24	Academica Recea
57	2024–25	Academica Recea
58	2025–26	Academica Recea

== See also ==
=== Main Leagues ===
- Liga I
- Liga II
- Liga III
- Liga IV

=== County Leagues (Liga IV series) ===
North–East

- Liga IV Bacău
- Liga IV Botoșani
- Liga IV Iași
- Liga IV Neamț
- Liga IV Suceava
- Liga IV Vaslui

North–West

- Liga IV Bihor
- Liga IV Bistrița-Năsăud
- Liga IV Cluj
- Liga IV Maramureș
- Liga IV Satu Mare
- Liga IV Sălaj

Center

- Liga IV Alba
- Liga IV Brașov
- Liga IV Covasna
- Liga IV Harghita
- Liga IV Mureș
- Liga IV Sibiu

West

- Liga IV Arad
- Liga IV Caraș-Severin
- Liga IV Gorj
- Liga IV Hunedoara
- Liga IV Mehedinți
- Liga IV Timiș

South–West

- Liga IV Argeș
- Liga IV Dâmbovița
- Liga IV Dolj
- Liga IV Olt
- Liga IV Teleorman
- Liga IV Vâlcea

South

- Liga IV Bucharest
- Liga IV Călărași
- Liga IV Giurgiu
- Liga IV Ialomița
- Liga IV Ilfov
- Liga IV Prahova

South–East

- Liga IV Brăila
- Liga IV Buzău
- Liga IV Constanța
- Liga IV Galați
- Liga IV Tulcea
- Liga IV Vrancea
