= Liga IV Prahova =

- Founded: 1968
- Country: Romania
- Level on pyramid: 4
- Promotion to: Liga III
- Relegation to: Liga V Prahova
- Domestic cup: Cupa României – County phase
- Current champions: Progresul Drăgănești (1st title) (2025–26)
- Most championships: Victoria Florești (5 titles)
- Website: frf-ajf.ro/prahova
- Current: 2025–26 Liga IV Prahova

Liga IV Prahova, officially known as Liga A Prahova, is one of the regional football divisions of Liga IV, the fourth tier of the Romanian football league system, for clubs based in Prahova County, and is organized by AJF Prahova – Asociația Județeană de Fotbal (lit. 'County Football Association').

It is contested by a variable number of teams, depending on the number of teams relegated from Liga III, the number of teams promoted from Liga V Prahova, and the teams that withdraw or enter the competition. The winner may or may not be promoted to Liga III, depending on the result of a promotion play-off contested against the winner of a neighboring county series.

== History ==
Until 1924, Prahova football was represented at the national level by teams participating in competitions organized by the Central Commission of Foot-ball Bucharest. In August 1924, the Ploiești Regional Football Sub-Committee was established as the first official football organization in the county, bringing together teams from Prahova and Buzău. The regional championship was divided into Category II and Category III, under the supervision of the Central Commission in Bucharest. The first champion of the Sub-Committee, Venus Ploiești, took part in the promotion play-off for a place in the Bucharest championship.

In the summer of 1927, the Sub-Committee organized the first local championship, called District A, allowing the champion team to participate in the final tournament to determine Romania’s national champion. The 1927–28 season included six teams—five from Ploiești and one from Buzău. At the same time, Category I, District B Ploiești was created, featuring teams from Câmpina, Ploiești, and Bușteni.

In 1950, the Romanian People's Republic underwent an administrative and territorial reorganization, dividing the country into regions and districts, each with its own football championship.

In 1968, following the new administrative and territorial reorganization of the country, each county established its own football championship, integrating teams from the former regional championships as well as those that had previously competed in town and rayon level competitions. The freshly formed Prahova County Championship was placed under the authority of the newly created Consiliul Județean pentru Educație Fizică și Sport (lit. 'County Council for Physical Education and Sports') in Prahova County.

Since then, the structure and organization of Liga IV Prahova, like many other county leagues, has undergone numerous changes. From 1968 to 1992, the top county competition was known as Campionatul Județean (County Championship). Between 1992 and 1997, it was renamed Divizia C – Faza Județeană (Divizia C – County Phase), followed by Divizia D from 1997 to 2006, and Liga A Prahova from 2006 to the present.

== Promotion ==
The champions of each county association play against one another in a play-off to earn promotion to Liga III. Geographical criteria are taken into consideration when the play-offs are drawn. In total, there are 41 county champions plus the Bucharest municipal champion.

== List of champions ==
=== Prahova District Championship ===
Ed.	Season	Winners
1	1927–28	Tricolor Ploiești
2	1928–29	Tricolor Ploiești
3	1929–30	Tricolor Ploiești
4	1930–31	Prahova Ploiești
5	1931–32	Tricolor Ploiești
6	1932–33	Prahova Ploiești
7	1933–34	Prahova Ploiești
8	1934–35	Sportul Muncitoresc Câmpina
9	1935–36	Venus Câmpina
10	1936–37	Sportul Muncitoresc Câmpina
11	1937–38	Astra Română Moreni
12	1938–39	Feroemail Ploiești
13	1939–40	Astra Română Moreni
14	1940–41	Mărășești Valea Călugărească
15	1945–46	Prahova Ploiești
16	1946–47	Astra Română Ploiești
17	1947–48	Sindicatul Metalo-Chimic Sinaia
18	1948	Româno-Americană Teleajen
19	1949	Astra Poiana Câmpina
20	1950	Partizanul Câmpina

=== Prahova Regional Championship ===
Ed.	Season	Winners
Prahova Regional Championship
1	1951	Flacăra Poiana Câmpina
2	1952	Flacăra Târgoviște
Ploiești Regional Championship
3	1953	Metalul Uzina „1 Mai” Ploiești
4	1954	Metalul 113 Plopeni
5	1955	Flacăra Târgoviște
6	1956	Rafinăria 4 Câmpina
7	1957–58	Rapid Plopeni
8	1958–59	Olimpia Pucioasa
9	1959–60	Rapid Plopeni
10	1960–61	Carpați Sinaia
11	1961–62	Rapid Plopeni
12	1962–63	Rapid Mizil
13	1963–64	Rapid Plopeni
14	1964–65	Rafinăria Câmpina
15	1965–66	Metalul Buzău
16	1966–67	Victoria Boboc
17	1967–68	Prahova Ploiești

=== Prahova County Championship ===
Ed.	Season	Winners
County Championship
1	1968–69	Vagonul Ploiești
2	1969–70	Victoria Florești
3	1970–71	Viitorul Slănic
4	1971–72	Chimia Brazi
5	1972–73	Avântul Măneciu
6	1973–74	Petrolul Teleajen Ploiești
7	1974–75	IUC Ploiești
8	1975–76	IUC Ploiești
9	1976–77	Petrolul Băicoi
10	1977–78	ICIM Câmpina
11	1978–79	Victoria Florești
12	1979–80	ICIM Ploiești
13	1980–81	Minerul Filipeștii de Pădure
14	1981–82	Victoria Florești
15	1982–83	Avântul Măneciu
16	1983–84	Victoria Florești
17	1984–85	Victoria Florești
18	1985–86	SM Câmpina
19	1986–87	Montana Sinaia
20	1987–88	Metalul IUM Filipeștii de Pădure
21	1988–89	Rafinorul Ploiești
22	1989–90	Carpați Sinaia
23	1990–91	Unirea Dealu Mare Urlați
24	1991–92	Astra Ploiești
Divizia C – County phase
25	1992–93	Metalul Filipeștii de Pădure
26	1993–94	Petrolistul Boldești
27	1994–95	Petrolul Teleajen Ploiești
28	1995–96	Metalul Filipeștii de Pădure
29	1996–97	Minerul Filipeștii de Pădure
Divizia D
30	1997–98	Chimia Brazi
31	1998–99	Conpet Ploiești
32	1999–00	Petrolistul Boldești
33	2000–01	Hidrojet Breaza
34	2001–02	Metalul Băicoi
35	2002–03	UZTEL Ploiești
36	2003–04	Carpați Sinaia
37	2004–05	Matizol Ploiești
38	2005–06	Avântul Măneciu

Ed.	Season	Winners
Liga IV
39	2006–07	Filipeștii de Pădure
40	2007–08	Voința Kaproni Gornet
41	2008–09	Petrolul Teleajen Ploiești
42	2009–10	Plopeni
43	2010–11	Prahova 2010 Tomșani
44	2011–12	Unirea Câmpina
45	2012–13	Câmpina
46	2013–14	Astra II Ciorani
47	2014–15	Petrolistul Boldești
48	2015–16	Păulești
49	2016–17	Petrolul Ploiești
50	2017–18	Blejoi
51	2018–19	Blejoi
52	2019–20	Plopeni
53	2020–21	Petrolul 95 Ploiești
54	2021–22	Păulești
55	2022–23	Tricolorul Breaza
56	2023–24	Băicoi
57	2024–25	Teleajenul Vălenii de Munte
58	2025–26	Progresul Drăgănești

== Performance by club ==
=== Prahova County Championship (1968–) ===
Club	Winners	Runners-up	Winning seasons	Runner-up seasons
Victoria Florești	5		1969–70, 1978–79, 1981–82, 1983–84, 1984–85	
Metalul Filipeștii de Pădure	3		1987–88, 1992–93, 1995–96	
Avântul Măneciu	3	1	1972–73, 1982–83, 2005–06	2009–10
Petrolul Teleajen Ploiești	3		1973–74, 1994–95, 2008–09	
Boldești-Scăeni	3	4	1993–94, 1999–00, 2014–15	1987–88, 1990–91, 2012–13, 2013–14
IUC Ploiești	2		1974–75, 1975–76	
Astra Ploiești	2		1988–89, 1991–92	
Minerul Filipeștii de Pădure	2		1980–81, 1996–97	
Chimia Brazi	2		1971–72, 1997–98	
Carpați Sinaia	2	1	1989–90, 2003–04	1988–89
Blejoi	2	4	2017–18, 2018–19	2011–12, 2014–15, 2015–16, 2016–17
Plopeni	2		2009–10, 2019–20	
Păulești	2	1	2015–16, 2021–22	2017–18
Tricolorul Breaza	2	3	2000–01, 2022–23	1974–75, 1976–77, 2019–20
Băicoi	2	3	1976–77, 2023–24	1969–70, 1971–72, 2020–21
Vagonul Ploiești	1	2	1968–69	1970–71, 1972–73
Viitorul Slănic	1		1970–71	
ICIM Câmpina	1		1977–78	
ICIM Ploiești	1		1979–80	
SM Câmpina	1		1985–86	
Montana Sinaia	1		1986–87	
Unirea Urlați	1		1990–91	
Conpet Ploiești	1		1998–99	
Metalul Băicoi	1	1	2001–02	1997–98
UZTEL Ploiești	1		2002–03	
Matizol Ploiești	1		2004–05	
Filipeștii de Pădure	1		2006–07	
Voința Kaproni Gornet	1	1	2007–08	2006–07
Prahova 2010 Tomșani	1		2010–11	
Unirea Câmpina	1		2011–12	
Câmpina	1		2012–13	
Astra II Ciorani	1		2013–14	
Petrolul Ploiești	1		2016–17	
Petrolul 95 Ploiești	1		2020–21	
Teleajenul Vălenii de Munte	1	1	2024–25	2023–24
Progresul Drăgănești	1		2025–26	
Electromotor Câmpina		5		1975–76, 1977–78, 1978–79, 1979–80, 1980–81
UZUC Ploiești		1		1968–69
Chimistul Valea Călugărească		2		1981–82, 1989–90
Oțelul Câmpina		1		1983–84
Geamul Scăieni		1		1984–85
Petrolul Ploiești II		1		2008–09
Ceptura		1		2010–11
Bănești-Urleta		1		2018–19
Atletic United 1906 Ploiești		1		2021–22
Câmpina		1		2022–23
Cornu		1		2025–26

=== Ploiești Regional Championship (1951–1968) ===
Club	Winners	Winning seasons
Plopeni	5	1954, 1957–58, 1959–60, 1961–62, 1963–64
Flacăra Târgoviște	2	1952, 1955
Rafinăria Câmpina	2	1956, 1964–65
Prahova Ploiești	2	1953, 1967–68
Flacăra Poiana Câmpina	1	1951
Olimpia Pucioasa	1	1958–59
Carpați Sinaia	1	1960–61
Rapid Mizil	1	1962–63
Metalul Buzău	1	1965–66
Victoria Boboc	1	1966–67

=== Ploiești District Championship (1928–1950) ===
Club	Winners	Winning seasons
Tricolor Ploiești	4	1927–28, 1928–29, 1929–30, 1931–32
Prahova Ploiești	4	1930–31, 1932–33, 1933–34, 1945–46
Sportul Muncitoresc Câmpina	2	1934–35, 1936–37
Astra Română Moreni	2	1937–38, 1946–47
Venus Câmpina	1	1935–36
Feroemail Ploiești	1	1938–39
Mărășești Valea Călugărească	1	1940–41
Astra Română Ploiești	1	1946–47
Sindicatul Metalo-Chimic Sinaia	1	1947–48
Româno-Americană Teleajen	1	1948
Astra Poiana Câmpina	1	1949
Partizanul Câmpina	1	1950

== See also ==
=== Main Leagues ===
- Liga I
- Liga II
- Liga III
- Liga IV

=== County Leagues (Liga IV series) ===
North–East

- Liga IV Bacău
- Liga IV Botoșani
- Liga IV Iași
- Liga IV Neamț
- Liga IV Suceava
- Liga IV Vaslui

North–West

- Liga IV Bihor
- Liga IV Bistrița-Năsăud
- Liga IV Cluj
- Liga IV Maramureș
- Liga IV Satu Mare
- Liga IV Sălaj

Center

- Liga IV Alba
- Liga IV Brașov
- Liga IV Covasna
- Liga IV Harghita
- Liga IV Mureș
- Liga IV Sibiu

West

- Liga IV Arad
- Liga IV Caraș-Severin
- Liga IV Gorj
- Liga IV Hunedoara
- Liga IV Mehedinți
- Liga IV Timiș

South–West

- Liga IV Argeș
- Liga IV Dâmbovița
- Liga IV Dolj
- Liga IV Olt
- Liga IV Teleorman
- Liga IV Vâlcea

South

- Liga IV Bucharest
- Liga IV Călărași
- Liga IV Giurgiu
- Liga IV Ialomița
- Liga IV Ilfov
- Liga IV Prahova

South–East

- Liga IV Brăila
- Liga IV Buzău
- Liga IV Constanța
- Liga IV Galați
- Liga IV Tulcea
- Liga IV Vrancea
