= Liga IV Hunedoara =

Fourth tier Romanian football league

- Founded: 1968
- Country: Romania
- Level on pyramid: 4
- Promotion to: Liga III
- Relegation to: Liga V Hunedoara
- Domestic cup: Cupa României – County phase
- Current champions: Deva (3rd title) (2025–26)
- Most championships: Dacia Orăștie (7 titles)
- Website: frf-ajf.ro/hunedoara
- Current: 2025–26 Liga IV Hunedoara

Liga IV Hunedoara is one of the regional football divisions of Liga IV, the fourth tier of the Romanian football league system, for clubs based in Hunedoara County, and is organized by AJF Hunedoara – Asociația Județeană de Fotbal (lit. 'County Football Association').

It is contested by a variable number of teams, depending on the number of teams relegated from Liga III, the number of teams promoted from Liga V Hunedoara, and the teams that withdraw or enter the competition. The winner may or may not be promoted to Liga III, depending on the result of a promotion play-off contested against the winner of a neighboring county series.

== History ==
In 1968, following the new administrative and territorial reorganization of the country, each county established its own football championship, integrating teams from the former regional championships as well as those that had previously competed in town and rayon level competitions. The freshly formed Hunedoara County Championship was placed under the authority of the newly created Consiliul Județean pentru Educație Fizică și Sport (lit. 'County Council for Physical Education and Sports') in Hunedoara County.

Since then, the structure and organization of Liga IV Hunedoara, like those of other county championships, have undergone numerous changes. Between 1968 and 1992, the main county competition was known as the Campionatul Județean (County Championship). Between 1992 and 1997, it was renamed Divizia C – Faza Județeană (Divizia C – County Phase), followed by Divizia D starting in 1997, and since 2006, it has been known as Liga IV.

== Promotion ==
The champions of each county association play against one another in a play-off to earn promotion to Liga III. Geographical criteria are taken into consideration when the play-offs are drawn. In total, there are 41 county champions plus the Bucharest municipal champion.

== List of champions ==
=== Hunedoara Regional Championship ===
Ed.	Season	Winners
1	1951	Metalul Hunedoara
2	1952	Metalul Hunedoara
3	1953	Constructorul Hunedoara
4	1954	Metalul 108 Cugir
5	1955	Flacăra 14 Orăștie
6	1956	Progresul Brad
7	1957–58	CFR Simeria
8	1958–59	Minerul Aninoasa
9	1959–60	Aurul Brad
10	1960–61	Minerul Deva
11	1961–62	Metalurgistul Cugir
12	1962–63	Victoria Călan
13	1963–64	Minerul Aninoasa
14	1964–65	Știința Petroșani
15	1965–66	Aurul Zlatna
16	1966–67	Aurul Brad
17	1967–68	Știința Petroșani (Valea Jiului Series); Aurul Zlatna (Valea Mureșului Series)

=== Hunedoara County Championship ===
Ed.	Season	Winners
County Championship
1	1968–69	Minerul Teliuc
2	1969–70	CFR Simeria
3	1970–71	Constructorul Hunedoara
4	1971–72	Dacia Orăștie
5	1972–73	Dacia Orăștie
6	1973–74	Sportul Studențesc Hunedoara
7	1974–75	Constructorul Hunedoara
8	1975–76	FIL Orăștie
9	1976–77	Minerul Vulcan
10	1977–78	Aurul Certej
11	1978–79	Explorări Deva
12	1979–80	Minerul Paroșeni
13	1980–81	Minerul Aninoasa
14	1981–82	Constructorul Hunedoara
15	1982–83	Mecanica Orăștie
16	1983–84	CFR Simeria
17	1984–85	CFR Simeria
18	1985–86	Minerul Ghelari
19	1986–87	Minerul Uricani
20	1987–88	Retezatul Hațeg
21	1988–89	Dacia Orăștie
22	1989–90	Minerul Uricani
23	1990–91	Parângul Lonea
24	1991–92	Metaloplastica Orăștie
Divizia C – County phase
25	1992–93	Parângul Lonea
26	1993–94	Mureșul Deva
27	1994–95	Minerul Certej
28	1995–96	Dacia Orăștie
29	1996–97	Aurul Brad
Divizia D
30	1997–98	Aurul Brad
31	1998–99	Parângul Lonea
32	1999–00	CFR Marmosim Simeria
33	2000–01	Vulcan
34	2001–02	Vulcan
35	2002–03	Minerul Bărbăteni
36	2003–04	Deva II
37	2004–05	Minerul Uricani
38	2005–06	Dacia Orăștie

Ed.	Season	Winners
Liga IV
39	2006–07	CFR Marmosim Simeria
40	2007–08	Dacia Orăștie
41	2008–09	Retezatul Hațeg
42	2009–10	Hunedoara
43	2010–11	Jiul Petroșani
44	2011–12	Vulcan
45	2012–13	Universitatea Petroșani
47	2014–15	Cetate Deva
48	2015–16	Hercules Lupeni
49	2016–17	Inter Petrila
50	2017–18	Hunedoara
51	2018–19	Retezatul Hațeg
52	2019–20	Jiul Petroșani
53	2020–21	Aurul Brad
54	2021–22	Retezatul Hațeg
55	2022–23	Gloria Geoagiu
56	2023–24	Minerul Lupeni
57	2024–25	Unirea DMO
58	2025–26	Deva

== See also ==
=== Main Leagues ===
- Liga I
- Liga II
- Liga III
- Liga IV

=== County Leagues (Liga IV series) ===
North–East

- Liga IV Bacău
- Liga IV Botoșani
- Liga IV Iași
- Liga IV Neamț
- Liga IV Suceava
- Liga IV Vaslui

North–West

- Liga IV Bihor
- Liga IV Bistrița-Năsăud
- Liga IV Cluj
- Liga IV Maramureș
- Liga IV Satu Mare
- Liga IV Sălaj

Center

- Liga IV Alba
- Liga IV Brașov
- Liga IV Covasna
- Liga IV Harghita
- Liga IV Mureș
- Liga IV Sibiu

West

- Liga IV Arad
- Liga IV Caraș-Severin
- Liga IV Gorj
- Liga IV Hunedoara
- Liga IV Mehedinți
- Liga IV Timiș

South–West

- Liga IV Argeș
- Liga IV Dâmbovița
- Liga IV Dolj
- Liga IV Olt
- Liga IV Teleorman
- Liga IV Vâlcea

South

- Liga IV Bucharest
- Liga IV Călărași
- Liga IV Giurgiu
- Liga IV Ialomița
- Liga IV Ilfov
- Liga IV Prahova

South–East

- Liga IV Brăila
- Liga IV Buzău
- Liga IV Constanța
- Liga IV Galați
- Liga IV Tulcea
- Liga IV Vrancea
