= Liga IV Bihor =

Fourth tier Romanian football league

- Founded: 1968
- Country: Romania
- Level on pyramid: 4
- Promotion to: Liga III
- Relegation to: Liga V Bihor
- Domestic cup: Cupa României – County phase
- Current champions: Transilvania Sport Academy (1st title) (2025–26)
- Most championships: Minerul Ștei (8 titles)
- Website: frf-ajf.ro/bihor
- Current: 2025–26 Liga IV Bihor

Liga IV Bihor is one of the regional football divisions of Liga IV, the fourth tier of the Romanian football league system, for clubs based in Bihor County, and is organized by AJF Bihor – Asociația Județeană de Fotbal (lit. 'County Football Association').

It is contested by a variable number of teams, depending on the number of teams relegated from Liga III, the number of teams promoted from Liga V Bihor, and the teams that withdraw or enter the competition. The winner may or may not be promoted to Liga III, depending on the result of a promotion play-off contested against the winner of a neighboring county series.

== History ==
In 1968, following the new administrative and territorial reorganization of the country, each county established its own football championship, integrating teams from the former regional championships as well as those that had previously competed in town and rayon level competitions. The freshly formed Bihor County Championship was placed under the authority of the newly created Consiliul Județean pentru Educație Fizică și Sport (lit. 'County Council for Physical Education and Sports') in Bihor County.

Since then, the structure and organization of Bihor’s main county competition, like those of other county championships, have undergone numerous changes. Between 1968 and 1992, it was known as Campionatul Județean (County Championship). From 1992, football in Bihor County was organized by Asociația Județeană de Fotbal (lit. 'County Football Association'). The competition was renamed Divizia C – Faza Județeană (Divizia C – County phase), became Divizia D in 1997, and has been known as Liga IV since 2006, following a trademark dispute involving the name Divizia A, after which the Romanian Football Federation decided to standardize the naming of the lower leagues.

== Promotion ==
The champions of Bihor County are eligible for promotion to Liga III through a promotion play-off determined by geographical criteria against the champions of neighboring counties, although in some seasons the play-off was not held.

Over the years, Liga IV Bihor County has been one of the most successful and prolific fourth-tier divisions in Romanian football, providing numerous clubs for Liga III, or Divizia C as it was known until 2006. Among the teams that have earned promotion from the Bihor County Championship are Bihoreana Marghita, Crișul Aleșd, Oșorhei, Sânmartin, Luceafărul Oradea, Minerul Ștei, Minerul Șuncuiuș, Olimpia Salonta, Oțelul Ștei, Unirea Valea lui Mihai, Tricolorul Oradea and Voința Oradea.

== List of champions ==
=== Bihor Regional Championship ===
Ed.	Season	Winners
Bihor Regional Championship
1	1951	Metalul Oradea
2	1952	Spartac Salonta
Oradea Regional Championship
3	1953	Spartac Salonta
4	1954	Flamura Roșie Salonta
5	1955	
6	1956	Flamura Roșie Oradea
7	1957–58	Gloria CFR Oradea
8	1958–59	Granit Dr. Petru Groza
9	1959–60	Voința Oradea
Crișana Regional Championship
10	1960–61	Crișul Oradea
11	1961–62	Voința Oradea
12	1962–63	Steaua Roșie Salonta
13	1963–64	Dinamo Oradea
14	1964–65	Dinamo Oradea
15	1965–66	Gloria Ioșia
16	1966–67	Voința Oradea
17	1967–68	Dinamo Oradea (North Series); Știința Oradea (South Series)

=== Bihor County Championship ===
Ed.	Season	Winners
County Championship
1	1968–69	Minerul Bihor
2	1969–70	Minerul Bihor
3	1970–71	Bihoreana Marghita
4	1971–72	Minerul Bihor
5	1972–73	Minerul Șuncuiuș
6	1973–74	Voința Oradea
7	1974–75	Bihorul Beiuș
8	1975–76	Oțelul Bihor
9	1976–77	Minerul Voivozi
10	1977–78	Tricolorul Beiuș
11	1978–79	Alumina Oradea
12	1979–80	Unirea Valea lui Mihai
13	1980–81	Tricolorul Oradea
14	1981–82	Minerul Bihor
15	1982–83	Minerul Șuncuiuș
16	1983–84	Recolta Salonta
17	1984–85	Gloria Beiuș
18	1985–86	Bihoreana Marghita
19	1986–87	Voința Oradea
20	1987–88	Voința Oradea
21	1988–89	Minerul Bihor
22	1989–90	Olimpia Salonta
23	1990–91	Minerul Voivozi
24	1991–92	Minerul Voivozi
Divizia C – County phase
25	1992–93	Olimpia Salonta
26	1993–94	Minerul Ștei
27	1994–95	Minerul Ștei
28	1995–96	Viitorul Oradea
29	1996–97	Crișul Aleșd
Divizia D
30	1997–98	Minerul Șuncuiuș
31	1998–99	Olimpia Salonta
32	1999–00	Oțelul Ștei
33	2000–01	Viitorul Oradea
34	2001–02	Foresta Tileagd
35	2002–03	Minerul Ștei
36	2003–04	Olimpia Salonta
37	2004–05	Lotus Băile Felix
38	2005–06	Tricolorul Damore Alparea

Ed.	Season	Winners
Liga IV
39	2006–07	Bihor II Tileagd
40	2007–08	Liberty II Marghita
41	2008–09	Luceafărul Oradea
42	2009–10	Bioland Paleu
43	2010–11	Unirea Valea lui Mihai
44	2011–12	Tricolorul Alparea
45	2012–13	Kinder Junior Paleu
46	2013–14	Sânmartin
47	2014–15	Luceafărul Oradea
48	2015–16	Hidișelu de Sus
49	2016–17	Diosig Bihardiószeg
50	2017–18	Sânmartin
51	2018–19	Sânmartin
52	2019–20	CA Oradea
–	2020–21	Not disputed (Note: Not disputed due to COVID-19 pandemic in Romania.)
53	2021–22	Viitorul Borș
54	2022–23	Crișul Sântandrei
55	2023–24	Diosig Bihardiószeg
56	2024–25	Bihorul Beiuș
57	2025–26	Transilvania Sport Academy

== See also ==
=== Main Leagues ===
- Liga I
- Liga II
- Liga III
- Liga IV

=== County Leagues (Liga IV series) ===
North–East

- Liga IV Bacău
- Liga IV Botoșani
- Liga IV Iași
- Liga IV Neamț
- Liga IV Suceava
- Liga IV Vaslui

North–West

- Liga IV Bihor
- Liga IV Bistrița-Năsăud
- Liga IV Cluj
- Liga IV Maramureș
- Liga IV Satu Mare
- Liga IV Sălaj

Center

- Liga IV Alba
- Liga IV Brașov
- Liga IV Covasna
- Liga IV Harghita
- Liga IV Mureș
- Liga IV Sibiu

West

- Liga IV Arad
- Liga IV Caraș-Severin
- Liga IV Gorj
- Liga IV Hunedoara
- Liga IV Mehedinți
- Liga IV Timiș

South–West

- Liga IV Argeș
- Liga IV Dâmbovița
- Liga IV Dolj
- Liga IV Olt
- Liga IV Teleorman
- Liga IV Vâlcea

South

- Liga IV Bucharest
- Liga IV Călărași
- Liga IV Giurgiu
- Liga IV Ialomița
- Liga IV Ilfov
- Liga IV Prahova

South–East

- Liga IV Brăila
- Liga IV Buzău
- Liga IV Constanța
- Liga IV Galați
- Liga IV Tulcea
- Liga IV Vrancea
