= 1958–59 Divizia C =

Third tier Romanian football league

Divizia C
- Season: 1958–59

The 1958–59 Divizia C was the 7th season of Liga III, the third tier of the Romanian football league system.

The format was changed from four series of fourteen teams each to six series of ten teams each. At the end of the season, the winners of the series qualified for the promotion play-off to Divizia B, while the bottom three teams from each series were relegated to the Regional Championship.

However, it was later decided to shut down Divizia C. As a result, all of the top two teams from each series were promoted, while the 3rd-placed teams competed in another promotion play-off for three additional spots in Divizia B.

== Team changes ==
=== To Divizia C ===
Relegated from Divizia B

- Partizanul Reghin
- CFR Cluj
- Progresul CPCS București
- CSU București

Promoted from Regional Championship

- Stăruința Satu Mare
- CSA Bacău
- ITB București
- Oltul Turnu Măgurele
- Metalul Aiud
- Cimentul Medgidia
- Dinamo Jiul Craiova
- Industria Sârmei Brăila
- CFR Simeria
- Constructorul Iași
- Alimentara Târgu Mureș
- Gloria CFR Oradea
- Unirea Pitești
- Rapid Plopeni
- Chimia Făgăraș
- Minerul Câmpulung Moldovenesc
- Metalul Bocșa Română

=== From Divizia C ===
Promoted to Divizia B

- Unirea Iași
- Metalul Titanii București
- Știința Craiova
- Gloria Bistrița

Relegated to Regional Championship

- Steaua Roșie Bacău
- Rulmentul Bârlad
- Oituz Târgu Ocna
- Sinteza Victoria
- Dinamo Pitești
- Olimpia Giurgiu
- Petrolul Pitești
- Rovine Grivița Craiova (excluded)
- Flacăra Orăștie
- Constructorul Arad (excluded)
- Recolta Salonta
- Stăruința Oradea
- Chimica Târnăveni

=== Renamed teams ===
Locomotiva Pașcani was renamed CFR Pașcani.

Știința IMF Iași was renamed Unirea Iași II.

Șantierul Naval Constanța was renamed Șantierul Naval Maritim Constanța.

Tisa Sighetu Marmației was renamed Stăruința Sighetu Marmației.

Gloria CFR Oradea was renamed Rapid Oradea.

Unirea Pitești was renamed Metalul Pitești.

Confecția București was renamed Victoria București.

CSU București was renamed Știința București.

Flamura Roșie Oradea was renamed Voința Oradea.

Partizanul Reghin was renamed Avântul Reghin.

ITB București was renamed Cetatea București.

Dinamo Jiul Craiova was renamed Dinamo Craiova.

Feroviarul Craiova was renamed CFR Rovine Craiova on 14 September 1958, and then Jiul Craiova in April 1959.

=== Other changes ===
CSA Bacău was moved to Piatra Neamț and renamed CS Piatra Neamț.

Drobeta Turnu Severin took the place of CFR Turnu Severin.

Victoria Tecuci was moved to Buzău and renamed Victoria Buzău.

Unirea Râmnicu Vâlcea was moved to Băile Govora and renamed Șantierul Govora.

== League tables ==
=== Seria I ===
Pos	Team	Pld	W	D	L	GF	GA	GD	Pts	Qualification or relegation
1	CFR Pașcani (C, P)	18	13	2	3	37	8	+29	28	Promotion to Divizia B
2	Sportul Muncitoresc Rădăuți (P)	18	13	2	3	36	14	+22	28	Promotion to Divizia B
3	CS Piatra Neamț (Q)	18	9	3	6	33	20	+13	21	Qualification to promotion play-off
4	Petrolul Moinești	18	8	3	7	21	32	−11	19	
5	Textila Buhuși	18	7	2	9	22	20	+2	16	
6	Minerul Câmpulung Moldovenesc	18	7	2	9	17	28	−11	16	
7	CSMS Iași II	18	6	3	9	24	30	−6	15	
8	Textila Botoșani	18	5	4	9	19	27	−8	14	
9	Gloria Dorohoi	18	5	3	10	25	36	−11	13	
10	Știința IMF Iași	18	4	2	12	18	37	−19	10	

Source: romaniansoccer.ro
Rules for classification: 1) Points; 2) Goal difference; 3) Number of goals scored.
(C) Champions; (P) Promoted; (Q) Qualified for the phase indicated

=== Seria II ===
Pos	Team	Pld	W	D	L	GF	GA	GD	Pts	Qualification or relegation
1	Victoria Buzău (C, P)	18	12	2	4	40	14	+26	26	Promotion to Divizia B
2	SNM Constanța (P)	18	11	2	5	32	18	+14	24	Promotion to Divizia B
3	Dinamo Miliție București (Q)	18	10	2	6	48	27	+21	22	Qualification to promotion play-off
4	Industria Sârmei Brăila	18	9	3	6	29	21	+8	21	
5	IMU Medgidia	18	7	3	8	22	28	−6	17	
6	CSM Galați	18	7	3	8	21	28	−7	17	
7	CPCS București	18	7	2	9	27	26	+1	16	
8	Știința Galați	18	6	3	9	26	33	−7	15	
9	Cimentul Medgidia	18	6	2	10	19	41	−22	14	
10	Ancora Galați	18	3	2	13	14	42	−28	8	

Source: romaniansoccer.ro
Rules for classification: 1) Points; 2) Goal difference; 3) Number of goals scored.
(C) Champions; (P) Promoted; (Q) Qualified for the phase indicated

=== Seria III ===
Pos	Team	Pld	W	D	L	GF	GA	GD	Pts	Qualification or relegation
1	Știința București (C, P)	18	12	4	2	35	14	+21	28	Promotion to Divizia B
2	Jiul Craiova (P)	18	9	5	4	29	19	+10	23	Promotion to Divizia B
3	Metalul Târgoviște (Q)	18	10	3	5	31	21	+10	23	Qualification to promotion play-off
4	Rapid Plopeni	18	10	0	8	37	21	+16	20	
5	Victoria București	18	6	6	6	15	16	−1	18	
6	Dinamo Craiova	18	4	10	4	11	14	−3	18	
7	Cetatea București	18	5	6	7	26	20	+6	16	
8	Metalul Pitești	18	4	5	9	11	19	−8	13	
9	Oltul Turnu Măgurele	18	4	4	10	17	42	−25	12	
10	Dunărea Corabia	18	4	1	13	9	35	−26	9	

Source: romaniansoccer.ro
Rules for classification: 1) Points; 2) Goal difference; 3) Number of goals scored.
(C) Champions; (P) Promoted; (Q) Qualified for the phase indicated

=== Seria IV ===
Pos	Team	Pld	W	D	L	GF	GA	GD	Pts	Qualification or relegation
1	Chimia Făgăraș (C, P)	18	11	5	2	36	23	+13	27	Promotion to Divizia B
2	Carpați Sinaia (P)	18	10	4	4	40	21	+19	24	Promotion to Divizia B
3	Textila Sfântu Gheorghe (Q)	18	10	2	6	26	21	+5	22	Qualification to promotion play-off
4	Metalul Aiud	18	7	5	6	36	27	+9	19	
5	Rafinăria Câmpina	18	8	3	7	42	32	+10	19	
6	Voința Târgu Mureș	18	5	7	6	17	19	−2	17	
7	Alimentara Târgu Mureș	18	6	4	8	28	33	−5	16	
8	Avântul Reghin	18	7	1	10	33	37	−4	15	
9	Torpedo Tohan	18	5	1	12	24	42	−18	11	
10	Mureșul Toplița	18	4	2	12	11	38	−27	10	

Source: romaniansoccer.ro
Rules for classification: 1) Points; 2) Goal difference; 3) Number of goals scored.
(C) Champions; (P) Promoted; (Q) Qualified for the phase indicated

=== Seria V ===
Pos	Team	Pld	W	D	L	GF	GA	GD	Pts	Qualification or relegation
1	Rapid Cluj (C, P)	18	12	4	2	46	17	+29	28	Promotion to Divizia B
2	CFR Cluj (P)	18	10	3	5	26	17	+9	23	Promotion to Divizia B
3	Recolta Carei (Q)	18	10	2	6	39	22	+17	22	Qualification to promotion play-off
4	Arieșul Turda	18	8	1	9	38	38	0	17	
5	Dinamo Săsar	18	7	3	8	21	23	−2	17	
6	Rapid Oradea	18	7	3	8	22	25	−3	17	
7	Someșul Satu Mare	18	7	2	9	25	29	−4	16	
8	Stăruința Satu Mare	18	4	6	8	24	35	−11	14	
9	Stăruința Sighetu Marmației	18	7	0	11	26	44	−18	14	
10	Voința Oradea	18	5	2	11	19	36	−17	12	

Source: romaniansoccer.ro
Rules for classification: 1) Points; 2) Goal difference; 3) Number of goals scored.
(C) Champions; (P) Promoted; (Q) Qualified for the phase indicated

=== Seria VI ===
Pos	Team	Pld	W	D	L	GF	GA	GD	Pts	Qualification or relegation
1	Metalul Oțelu Roșu (C, P)	18	11	3	4	44	20	+24	25	Promotion to Divizia B
2	Drobeta Turnu Severin (P)	18	12	1	5	35	20	+15	25	Promotion to Divizia B
3	Aurul Brad (Q)	18	11	1	6	42	23	+19	23	Qualification to promotion play-off
4	Șantierul Govora	18	9	3	6	25	25	0	21	
5	Metalul Bocșa Română	18	8	3	7	26	21	+5	19	
6	CFR Simeria	18	7	3	8	22	21	+1	17	
7	Olimpia Reșița	18	8	1	9	27	30	−3	17	
8	Flacăra Târgu Jiu	18	5	5	8	26	35	−9	15	
9	UM Cugir	18	5	1	12	18	41	−23	11	
10	Indagrara Arad	18	1	5	12	10	39	−29	7	

Source: romaniansoccer.ro
Rules for classification: 1) Points; 2) Goal difference; 3) Number of goals scored.
(C) Champions; (P) Promoted; (Q) Qualified for the phase indicated

== Promotion play-off ==
The promotion play-off was contested between the winners of each series, with matches held in Arad and Ploiești. The first two teams from each group were set to be promoted to Divizia B. However, it was later decided to shut down Divizia C. As a result, all of the top two teams from each series were promoted, while the 3rd-placed teams competed in another promotion play-off, held in Ploiești, Cluj and Bucharest for three additional spots.

First promotion play-off
Group I (Arad)

Pos	Team	Pld	W	D	L	GF	GA	GD	Pts	Promotion
1	Rapid Cluj (P)	2	1	1	0	3	2	+1	3	Promotion to Divizia B
2	Metalul Oțelu Roșu (P)	2	1	0	1	2	2	0	2	Promotion to Divizia B
3	Chimia Făgăraș (P)	2	0	1	1	3	4	−1	1	Promotion to Divizia B

Rules for classification: 1) Points 2) Head-to-head points; 3) Head-to-head goal difference; 4) Head-to-head goals scored; 5) Head-to-head away goals scored; 6) Goal difference; 7) Goals scored.
(P) Promoted

Group II (Ploiești)

Pos	Team	Pld	W	D	L	GF	GA	GD	Pts	Promotion
1	CFR Pașcani (P)	2	2	0	0	3	0	+3	4	Promotion to Divizia B
2	Victoria Buzău (P)	2	1	0	1	1	2	−1	2	Promotion to Divizia B
3	Știința București (P)	2	0	0	2	0	2	−2	0	Promotion to Divizia B

Rules for classification: 1) Points 2) Head-to-head points; 3) Head-to-head goal difference; 4) Head-to-head goals scored; 5) Head-to-head away goals scored; 6) Goal difference; 7) Goals scored.
(P) Promoted

Second promotion play-off
Group I (Arad)

Pos	Team	Pld	W	D	L	GF	GA	GD	Pts	Promotion
1	Dinamo Miliție București (P)	2	1	1	0	5	4	+1	3	Promotion to Divizia B
2	Metalul Târgoviște (P)	2	1	0	1	10	3	+7	2	Qualification to promotion play-off
3	CS Piatra Neamț	2	0	1	1	2	10	−8	1	

Rules for classification: 1) Points 2) Head-to-head points; 3) Head-to-head goal difference; 4) Head-to-head goals scored; 5) Head-to-head away goals scored; 6) Goal difference; 7) Goals scored.
(P) Promoted

Group II (Ploiești)

Pos	Team	Pld	W	D	L	GF	GA	GD	Pts	Promotion
1	Recolta Carei (P)	2	1	1	0	2	1	+1	3	Promotion to Divizia B
2	Textila Sfântu Gheorghe	2	1	0	1	2	2	0	2	Qualification to promotion play-off
3	Aurul Brad	2	0	1	1	2	3	−1	1	

Rules for classification: 1) Points 2) Head-to-head points; 3) Head-to-head goal difference; 4) Head-to-head goals scored; 5) Head-to-head away goals scored; 6) Goal difference; 7) Goals scored.
(P) Promoted

Third promotion-play-off

The match was played on 24 August 1959 at Dinamo Stadium in Bucharest.

Team 1	Score	Team 2
Metalul Târgoviște	2–0	Textila Sfântu Gheorghe

== See also ==
- 1958–59 Divizia A
- 1958–59 Divizia B
- 1958–59 Regional Championship
- 1958–59 Cupa României
