= Liga IV Argeș =

Fourth tier Romanian football league

- Founded: 1968; 58 years ago
- Country: Romania
- Level on pyramid: 4
- Promotion to: Liga III
- Relegation to: Liga V Argeș
- Domestic cup: Cupa României – County phase
- Current champions: Petrolul Hârtiești (1st title) (2025–26)
- Most championships: ARO Muscelul Câmpulung (5 titles)
- Website: frf-ajf.ro/arges
- Current: 2025–26 Liga IV Argeș

Liga IV Argeș is one of the regional football divisions of Liga IV, the fourth tier of the Romanian football league system, for clubs based in Argeș County, and is organized by AJF Argeș – Asociația Județeană de Fotbal (lit. 'County Football Association').

It is contested by a variable number of teams, depending on the number of teams relegated from Liga III, the number of teams promoted from Liga V Argeș, and the teams that withdraw or enter the competition. The winner may or may not be promoted to Liga III, depending on the result of a promotion play-off contested against the winner of a neighboring county series.

== History ==
In 1968, following the new administrative and territorial reorganization of the country, each county established its own football championship, integrating teams from the former regional championships as well as those that had previously competed in town and rayon level competitions. The freshly formed Argeș County Championship was placed under the authority of the newly created Consiliul Județean pentru Educație Fizică și Sport (lit. 'County Council for Physical Education and Sports') in Argeș County.

Since then, the structure and organization of Argeș’s main county competition, like those of other county championships, have undergone numerous changes. Between 1968 and 1992, it was known as Campionatul Județean (County Championship). In 1992, it was renamed Divizia C – Faza Județeană (Divizia C – County Phase), became Divizia D in 1997, and has been known as Liga IV since 2006.

== Promotion ==
The champions of each county association play against one another in a play-off to earn promotion to Liga III. Geographical criteria are taken into consideration when the play-offs are drawn. In total, there are 41 county champions plus the Bucharest municipal champion.

== List of Champions ==
=== Argeș Regional Championship ===
Ed.	Season	Winners
Argeș Regional Championship
1	1951	Spartac Curtea de Argeș
2	1952	Progresul Găești
Pitești Regional Championship
3	1953	Bucegi Câmpulung
4	1954	Flamura Roșie Râmnicu Vâlcea
5	1955	Dinamo Pitești
6	1956	Flacăra Leordeni
7	1957–58	Unirea Pitești
8	1958–59	Dinamo Pitești
9	1959–60	Chimia Govora
Argeș Regional Championship
10	1960–61	Muscelul IMS Câmpulung
11	1961–62	Metalul Pitești
12	1962–63	Metalul Pitești
13	1963–64	Minerul Câmpulung
14	1964–65	Oltul CIL Râmnicu Vâlcea
15	1965–66	Metalul Pitești
16	1966–67	Metalul Pitești
17	1967–68	Unirea Drăgășani

=== Argeș County Championship ===
Ed.	Season	Winners
County Championship
1	1968–69	Metalul Pitești
2	1969–70	Rapid Pitești
3	1970–71	Muscelul Câmpulung
4	1971–72	Textilistul Pitești
5	1972–73	Vulturii Muscelului Câmpulung
6	1973–74	Topoloveni
7	1974–75	Constructorul Pitești
8	1975–76	Dacia Pitești
9	1976–77	Automobilul Curtea de Argeș
10	1977–78	Gloria Berevoești
11	1978–79	Gloria Berevoești
12	1979–80	Petrolul Bascov
13	1980–81	Constructorul Pitești
14	1981–82	Progresul Topoloveni
15	1982–83	Avântul ICRA Pitești
16	1983–84	Progresul Topoloveni
17	1984–85	Gloria Berevoești
18	1985–86	Constructorul Pitești
19	1986–87	Edilul IJGCL Pitești
20	1987–88	Mecanică Fină Costești
21	1988–89	Minerul Câmpulung
22	1989–90	Foresta CPL Pitești
23	1990–91	Rapid Pitești
24	1991–92	Viitorul INC Costești
Divizia C – County phase
25	1992–93	ARO Câmpulung
26	1993–94	ARO Câmpulung
27	1994–95	Viitorul Costești
28	1995–96	Unirea Pitești
29	1996–97	Forestierul Stâlpeni
Divizia D
30	1997–98	Forestierul Stâlpeni
31	1998–99	Curtea de Argeș
32	1999–00	Juventus Bascov
33	2000–01	Forestierul Stâlpeni
34	2001–02	Fulgerul Lerești
35	2002–03	Juventus Bascov
36	2003–04	Arpechim Pitești
37	2004–05	Dacia Mioveni II
38	2005–06	Unirea Costești

Ed.	Season	Winners
Liga IV
39	2006–07	Juventus Bascov
40	2007–08	Albota
41	2008–09	Albota
42	2009–10	Atletic Bradu
43	2010–11	Rucăr
44	2011–12	SCM Pitești
45	2012–13	Atletic Bradu
46	2013–14	CNDG Câmpulung
47	2014–15	Unirea Bascov
48	2015–16	Argeș 1953 Pitești
49	2016–17	Unirea Bascov
50	2017–18	Unirea Bascov
51	2018–19	Real Bradu
52	2019–20	Voința Budeasa
53	2020–21	Real Bradu
54	2021–22	Rucăr
55	2022–23	ARO Muscelul Câmpulung
56	2023–24	Speed Academy Pitești
57	2024–25	Zimbrii Lerești
58	2025–26	Petrolul Hârtiești

== See also ==
=== Main Leagues ===
- Liga I
- Liga II
- Liga III
- Liga IV

=== County Leagues (Liga IV series) ===
North–East

- Liga IV Bacău
- Liga IV Botoșani
- Liga IV Iași
- Liga IV Neamț
- Liga IV Suceava
- Liga IV Vaslui

North–West

- Liga IV Bihor
- Liga IV Bistrița-Năsăud
- Liga IV Cluj
- Liga IV Maramureș
- Liga IV Satu Mare
- Liga IV Sălaj

Center

- Liga IV Alba
- Liga IV Brașov
- Liga IV Covasna
- Liga IV Harghita
- Liga IV Mureș
- Liga IV Sibiu

West

- Liga IV Arad
- Liga IV Caraș-Severin
- Liga IV Gorj
- Liga IV Hunedoara
- Liga IV Mehedinți
- Liga IV Timiș

South–West

- Liga IV Argeș
- Liga IV Dâmbovița
- Liga IV Dolj
- Liga IV Olt
- Liga IV Teleorman
- Liga IV Vâlcea

South

- Liga IV Bucharest
- Liga IV Călărași
- Liga IV Giurgiu
- Liga IV Ialomița
- Liga IV Ilfov
- Liga IV Prahova

South–East

- Liga IV Brăila
- Liga IV Buzău
- Liga IV Constanța
- Liga IV Galați
- Liga IV Tulcea
- Liga IV Vrancea
