= Liga IV Dolj =

Fourth tier Romanian football league

- Founded: 1968
- Country: Romania
- Level on pyramid: 4
- Promotion to: Liga III
- Relegation to: Liga V Dolj
- Domestic cup: Cupa României – County phase
- Current champions: Avântul Pielești (1st title) (2025–26)
- Most championships: Dunărea Calafat (7 titles)
- Website: frf-ajf.ro/dolj
- Current: 2025–26 Liga IV Dolj

Liga IV Dolj is one of the regional football divisions of Liga IV, the fourth tier of the Romanian football league system, for clubs based in Dolj County, and is organized by AJF Dolj – Asociația Județeană de Fotbal (lit. 'County Football Association').

It is contested by a variable number of teams, depending on the number of teams relegated from Liga III, the number of teams promoted from Liga V Dolj, and the teams that withdraw or enter the competition. The winner may or may not be promoted to Liga III, depending on the result of a promotion play-off contested against the winner of a neighboring county series.

== History ==
In its early days, football in Craiova was nurtured by three major human “reservoirs” – the military units and military high schools, as well as the “Mihai Viteazul” orphanage, which provided soldiers, officers, high school students, and young orphans who escaped the discipline of the barracks or the orphanage to play on improvised fields, in the streets of neighborhoods or on small lawns, until the first sports facilities appeared, such as the Generala field, arranged by the Commercial Employees’ Association, the CFR field near Calea București, and the ONEF stadium belonging to the City Hall. In this context, the first organized teams began to emerge. Between 1915 and 1919, groups such as Excelsior (later renamed Gladiator), Macabi, Oltenia, Asler, Gloria Craiovei, Tinerimea, along with several school teams, were active.

Having a regional character, the first District Championship of Craiova took place in the 1924–25 season, with participants including Oltul Slatina, Craiu Iovan Craiova, Rovine Grivița Craiova, Excelsior Craiova, Oltenia Craiova, Tinerimea Craiova, and Generala Craiova. The competition was won by Oltul Slatina, which represented the region in the national championship but was eliminated by Jahn Cernăuți 4–0. Subsequently, the competition was also known as the Oltenia District Championship, maintaining its regional character and being dominated by several teams from Craiova – especially Craiu Iovan, Generala, and Rovine Grivița – alongside Oltul Slatina, teams that became protagonists of the interwar football scene in the area.

After the administrative-territorial reform of 1950, with the establishment of Dolj Region, covering a territory similar to present-day Dolj County plus parts of what is now Olt County, the Dolj Regional Championship was created under the organization of the Regional Football Commission, intended for teams from this area. Following the country’s reorganization in September 1952, which unified the Dolj and Gorj regions, the Craiova Region was formed, and starting with the 1953 season, the competition became known as the Craiova Regional Championship.

In 1960, the region and the championship were renamed again, becoming Oltenia Region and Oltenia Regional Championship, respectively. This structure functioned until 1968, when a new administrative and territorial reorganization take place, and each county established its own football championship, integrating teams from the former regional championships as well as those that had previously competed in town and rayon level competitions. The freshly formed Dolj County Championship was placed under the authority of the newly created Consiliul Județean pentru Educație Fizică și Sport (lit. 'County Council for Physical Education and Sports') in Dolj County.

Since then, the structure and organization of Liga IV Dolj, like those of other county championships, have undergone numerous changes. Between 1968 and 1992, the main county competition was known as the Campionatul Județean (County Championship). Between 1992 and 1997, it was renamed Divizia C – Faza Județeană (Divizia C – County Phase), followed by Divizia D starting in 1997, and since 2006, it has been known as Liga IV.

== Promotion ==
The champions of each county association play against one another in a play-off to earn promotion to Liga III. Geographical criteria are taken into consideration when the play-offs are drawn. In total, there are 41 county champions plus the Bucharest municipal champion.

== List of champions ==
=== Dolj Regional Championship ===
Ed.	Season	Winners
Dolj Regional Championship
1	1950	Armata Craiova
2	1951	Locomotiva Craiova
3	1952	Locomotiva Craiova
Craiova Regional Championship
4	1953	Constructorul Craiova
5	1954	Știința Craiova
6	1955	
7	1956	Flacăra Târgu Jiu
8	1957–58	Dinamo Jiul Craiova
9	1958–59	CSA Craiova
10	1959–60	Electroputere Craiova
Oltenia Regional Championship
11	1960–61	Dinamo Craiova
12	1961–62	Drobeta Turnu Severin
13	1962–63	AS Târgu Jiu
14	1963–64	Metalul 7 Noiembrie Craiova
15	1964–65	Progresul Strehaia
16	1965–66	Autorapid Craiova
17	1966–67	Minerul Motru
18	1967–68	Steagul Roșu Plenița (Series I); Autorapid Craiova (Series II)

=== Dolj County Championship ===
Ed.	Season	Winners
County Championship
1	1968–69	Constructorul Craiova
2	1969–70	Autorapid Craiova
3	1970–71	Progresul Băilești
4	1971–72	Victoria Craiova
5	1972–73	CFR Craiova
6	1973–74	Progresul Băilești
7	1974–75	Constructorul Craiova
8	1975–76	Steagul Roșu Plenița
9	1976–77	Victoria Craiova
10	1977–78	Dunărea Calafat
11	1978–79	Dunărea Calafat
12	1979–80	Victoria Craiova
13	1980–81	Unirea Tricolor Dăbuleni
14	1981–82	Progresul Băilești
15	1982–83	Progresul Băilești
16	1983–84	Victoria Craiova
17	1984–85	Jiul IEELIF Craiova
18	1985–86	Jiul IEELIF Craiova
19	1986–87	ASA Craiova
20	1987–88	Constructorul Șoimii Craiova
21	1988–89	Jiul IEELIF Craiova
22	1989–90	Jiul IEELIF Craiova
23	1990–91	Autobuzul IJTL Craiova
24	1991–92	Dunărea Calafat
Divizia C – County phase
25	1992–93	Constructorul U Craiova
26	1993–94	Progresul Segarcea
27	1994–95	Autobuzul Craiova
28	1995–96	Petrolul Craiova
29	1996–97	Constructorul Craiova
Divizia D
30	1997–98	Bere Craiova
31	1998–99	Dinamo Segarcea
32	1999–00	Dunărea Calafat
33	2000–01	Pan Group Armata Craiova
34	2001–02	Chimia Craiova
35	2002–03	Știința CFR Craiova
36	2003–04	ȘF "Gică Popescu" Craiova
37	2004–05	Dunărea Calafat
38	2005–06	Gaz Metan Podari

Ed.	Season	Winners
Liga IV
39	2006–07	CFR Craiova
40	2007–08	Prometeu Craiova
41	2008–09	Avântul Bârca
42	2009–10	Sopot
43	2010–11	Sopot
44	2011–12	Apa Craiova
45	2012–13	Podari
46	2013–14	Filiași
47	2014–15	Universitatea Craiova II
48	2015–16	Tractorul Cetate
49	2016–17	Tractorul Cetate
50	2017–18	FCU 1948 Craiova
51	2018–19	Tractorul Cetate
52	2019–20	Unirea Tricolor Dăbuleni
53	2020–21	Dunărea Calafat
54	2021–22	Dunărea Calafat
55	2022–23	FCU 1948 Craiova II
56	2023–24	Metropolitan Ișalnița
57	2024–25	Cârcea
58	2025–26	Avântul Pielești

== See also ==
=== Main Leagues ===
- Liga I
- Liga II
- Liga III
- Liga IV

=== County Leagues (Liga IV series) ===
North–East

- Liga IV Bacău
- Liga IV Botoșani
- Liga IV Iași
- Liga IV Neamț
- Liga IV Suceava
- Liga IV Vaslui

North–West

- Liga IV Bihor
- Liga IV Bistrița-Năsăud
- Liga IV Cluj
- Liga IV Maramureș
- Liga IV Satu Mare
- Liga IV Sălaj

Center

- Liga IV Alba
- Liga IV Brașov
- Liga IV Covasna
- Liga IV Harghita
- Liga IV Mureș
- Liga IV Sibiu

West

- Liga IV Arad
- Liga IV Caraș-Severin
- Liga IV Gorj
- Liga IV Hunedoara
- Liga IV Mehedinți
- Liga IV Timiș

South–West

- Liga IV Argeș
- Liga IV Dâmbovița
- Liga IV Dolj
- Liga IV Olt
- Liga IV Teleorman
- Liga IV Vâlcea

South

- Liga IV Bucharest
- Liga IV Călărași
- Liga IV Giurgiu
- Liga IV Ialomița
- Liga IV Ilfov
- Liga IV Prahova

South–East

- Liga IV Brăila
- Liga IV Buzău
- Liga IV Constanța
- Liga IV Galați
- Liga IV Tulcea
- Liga IV Vrancea
