= 1957–58 Divizia C =

Third tier Romanian football league

Divizia C
- Season: 1957–58

The 1957–58 Divizia C was the 6th season of Liga III, the third tier of the Romanian football league system. This was the first season played using the autumn–spring system, following the previous season which was played under the spring–autumn system—a format imposed by the Soviet influence present in the country.

The format was maintained with four geographical series, each consisting of 14 teams. At the end of the season, the winners of each series were promoted to Divizia B, and the third-from-bottom teams in each series were relegated to the Regional Championship. At the end of the season, CFR Iași in Series I, Metalul Titanii București in Series II, Știința Craiova in Series III, and Gloria Bistrița in Series IV. topped their respective series and secured promotion to the 1958–59 Divizia B.

== Team changes ==
=== To Divizia C ===
Relegated from Divizia B

- Progresul Satu Mare
- Locomotiva Turnu Severin
- Locomotiva Iași
- Flamura Roșie Bacău

Promoted from Regional Championship

- Oituz Târgu Ocna
- Energia Metalul Bârlad
- Textila Botoșani
- Energia Metalul Galați
- Rafinăria Câmpina
- Metalul Medgidia
- Confecția București
- Sinteza Victoria
- Flacăra Leordeni
- Progresul Brad
- Flacăra Târgu Jiu
- Energia Reșița
- Gloria Bistrița
- Flamura Roșie Oradea
- Dinamo Baia Mare

=== From Divizia C ===
Promoted to Divizia B

- Recolta Fălticeni
- Locomotiva MCF București
- Energia Baia Mare
- Energia Metalul Arad

Relegated to Regional Championship

- Recolta Piatra Neamț
- Voința Tecuci
- Constructorul Constanța
- Flamura Roșie București
- Progresul Călărași
- ~~Energia Turda~~
- Locomotiva Oradea
- Progresul Timișoara
- Locomotiva Simeria

=== Renamed teams ===
Locomotiva Iași was renamed CFR Iași.

Energia Brăila was renamed Dinamo Brăila.

Progresul Rădăuți was renamed Sportul Muncitoresc Rădăuți.

Energia Moinești was renamed Petrolul Moinești.

Flamura Roșie Buhuși was renamed Textila Buhuși.

Dinamo Dorohoi was renamed Gloria Dorohoi.

Flamura Roșie Bacău was renamed Steaua Roșie Bacău.

Energia Metalul Bârlad was renamed Rulmentul Bârlad.

Energia Târgoviște was renamed Metalul Târgoviște.

Energia București was renamed Metalul Titanii București.

Energia Sinaia was renamed Carpați Sinaia.

Energia Tohan was renamed Torpedo Tohan.

Metalul Constanța was renamed Șantierul Naval Constanța.

Metalul Medgidia was renamed IMU Medgidia.

Locomotiva Galați was renamed Gloria CFR Galați.

Flamura Roșie Giurgiu was renamed Olimpia Giurgiu.

Flamura Roșie Râmnicu Vâlcea was renamed Unirea Râmnicu Vâlcea.

Locomotiva Turnu Severin was renamed CFR Turnu Severin.

Energia Oțelu Roșu was renamed Metalul Oțelu Roșu.

Progresul Brad was renamed Aurul Brad.

Progresul Corabia was renamed Dunărea Corabia.

Locomotiva Craiova was renamed Feroviarul Craiova.

Energia Cugir was renamed UM Cugir.

Energia Craiova was renamed Rovine Grivița Craiova.

Energia Reșița was renamed Olimpia Reșița.

Flamura Roșie 7 Noiembrie Arad was renamed Indagrara Arad.

Energia Orăștie was renamed Flacăra Orăștie.

Flamura Roșie Cluj was renamed Rapid Cluj.

Dinamo Târgu Mureș was renamed Voința Târgu Mureș.

Flamura Roșie Sfântu Gheorghe was renamed Textila Sfântu Gheorghe.

Recolta Sighetu Marmației was renamed Tisa Sighetu Marmației.

Recolta Toplița was renamed Mureșul Toplița.

Progresul Satu Mare was renamed Someșul Satu Mare.

Energia Oradea was renamed Stăruința Oradea.

Energia Târnăveni was renamed Chimica Târnăveni.

=== Other changes ===
Energia Metalul Galați merged with Dinamo Galați to form Ancora Galați.

Flacăra Leordeni was moved to Pitești and renamed Petrolul Pitești.

Progresul Turda and Energia Turda merged, the first one being absorbed by the second one. The new entity was named Arieșul Turda.

== League tables ==
=== Seria I ===
Pos	Team	Pld	W	D	L	GF	GA	GD	Pts	Qualification or relegation
1	CFR Iași (C, P)	26	19	4	3	67	19	+48	42	Promotion to Divizia B
2	Dinamo Brăila	26	14	9	3	51	22	+29	37	
3	Victoria Tecuci	26	14	5	7	34	26	+8	33	
4	Locomotiva Pașcani	26	12	7	7	42	26	+16	31	
5	Știința Galați	26	8	9	9	43	35	+8	25	
6	Sportul Muncitoresc Rădăuți	26	9	7	10	36	36	0	25	
7	Petrolul Moinești	26	10	5	11	34	37	−3	25	
8	Textila Buhuși	26	10	4	12	35	36	−1	24	
9	Gloria Dorohoi	26	8	8	10	36	45	−9	24	
10	Textila Botoșani	26	8	6	12	36	44	−8	22	
11	Știința IMF Iași	26	7	7	12	24	41	−17	21	
12	Steaua Roșie Bacău (R)	26	8	5	13	21	37	−16	21	Relegation to Regional Championship
13	Rulmentul Bârlad (R)	26	6	7	13	22	56	−34	19	Relegation to Regional Championship
14	Oituz Târgu Ocna (R)	26	6	3	17	19	40	−21	15	Relegation to Regional Championship

Source: romaniansoccer.ro
Rules for classification: 1) Points; 2) Goal difference; 3) Number of goals scored.
(C) Champions; (P) Promoted; (R) Relegated

=== Seria II ===
Pos	Team	Pld	W	D	L	GF	GA	GD	Pts	Qualification or relegation
1	Metalul Titanii București (C, P)	26	19	5	2	71	25	+46	43	Promotion to Divizia B
2	Metalul Târgoviște	26	17	2	7	70	28	+42	36	
3	Carpați Sinaia	26	14	4	8	74	44	+30	32	
4	Torpedo Tohan	26	11	7	8	45	34	+11	29	
5	Șantierul Naval Constanța	26	11	5	10	39	38	+1	27	
6	Rafinăria Câmpina	26	11	4	11	56	55	+1	26	
7	Gloria CFR Galați	26	9	7	10	38	37	+1	25	
8	Ancora Galați	26	10	5	11	35	36	−1	25	
9	IMU Medgidia	26	10	4	12	36	39	−3	24	
10	Confecția București	26	10	3	13	33	41	−8	23	
11	Sinteza Victoria (R)	26	10	3	13	35	51	−16	23	Relegation to Regional Championship
12	Dinamo Pitești (R)	26	9	3	14	30	46	−16	21	Relegation to Regional Championship
13	Olimpia Giurgiu (R)	26	7	4	15	38	68	−30	18	Relegation to Regional Championship
14	Petrolul Pitești (R)	26	4	4	18	27	85	−58	12	Relegation to Regional Championship

Source: romaniansoccer.ro
Rules for classification: 1) Points; 2) Goal difference; 3) Number of goals scored.
(C) Champions; (P) Promoted; (R) Relegated

=== Seria III ===
Pos	Team	Pld	W	D	L	GF	GA	GD	Pts	Qualification or relegation
1	Știința Craiova (C, P)	24	15	4	5	46	17	+29	34	Promotion to Divizia B
2	Unirea Râmnicu Vâlcea	24	15	4	5	59	23	+36	34	
3	Metalul Oțelu Roșu	24	14	1	9	44	32	+12	29	
4	Aurul Brad	24	10	6	8	36	28	+8	26	
5	CFR Turnu Severin	24	10	5	9	44	36	+8	25	
6	Dunărea Corabia	24	10	4	10	33	37	−4	24	
7	Feroviarul Craiova	24	10	3	11	42	40	+2	23	
8	UM Cugir	24	9	4	11	32	37	−5	22	
9	Flacăra Târgu Jiu	24	9	3	12	35	46	−11	21	
10	Rovine Grivița Craiova (Note: Rovine Grivița Craiova was excluded from the championship due to repeated irregularities.) (R)	24	7	7	10	22	38	−16	21	Relegation to Regional Championship
11	Olimpia Reșița	24	8	4	12	36	39	−3	20	
12	Indagrara Arad	24	5	8	11	22	39	−17	18	
13	Flacăra Orăștie (R)	24	6	3	15	22	61	−39	15	Relegation to Regional Championship
14	Constructorul Arad (Note: Constructorul Arad was excluded after 12 rounds and all its results were canceled.) (D)	0	0	0	0	0	0	0	0	Excluded

Source: romaniansoccer.ro
Rules for classification: 1) Points; 2) Goal difference; 3) Number of goals scored.
(C) Champions; (D) Disqualified; (P) Promoted; (R) Relegated

=== Seria IV ===
Pos	Team	Pld	W	D	L	GF	GA	GD	Pts	Qualification or relegation
1	Gloria Bistrița (C, P)	26	17	4	5	62	24	+38	38	Promotion to Divizia B
2	Flamura Roșie Oradea	26	11	9	6	53	25	+28	31	
3	Arieșul Turda	26	10	9	7	50	37	+13	29	
4	Rapid Cluj	26	9	11	6	22	28	−6	29	
5	Voința Târgu Mureș	26	9	9	8	44	38	+6	27	
6	Dinamo Baia Mare	26	10	7	9	33	39	−6	27	
7	Textila Sfântu Gheorghe	26	7	12	7	32	31	+1	26	
8	Tisa Sighetu Marmației	26	8	10	8	39	38	+1	26	
9	Mureșul Toplița	26	8	10	8	29	41	−12	26	
10	Recolta Carei	26	8	9	9	34	33	+1	25	
11	Someșul Satu Mare	26	9	6	11	43	45	−2	24	
12	Recolta Salonta (R)	26	7	9	10	30	43	−13	23	Relegation to Regional Championship
13	Stăruința Oradea (R)	26	6	7	13	27	45	−18	19	Relegation to Regional Championship
14	Chimica Târnăveni (R)	26	4	6	16	36	67	−31	14	Relegation to Regional Championship

Source: romaniansoccer.ro
Rules for classification: 1) Points; 2) Goal difference; 3) Number of goals scored.
(C) Champions; (P) Promoted; (R) Relegated

== See also ==
- 1957–58 Divizia A
- 1957–58 Divizia B
- 1957–58 Regional Championship
- 1957–58 Cupa României
