= 1959–60 Divizia B =

Divizia B
- Season: 1959–60
- Country: Romania
- Teams: 42 (3x14)
- Promoted: CSMS Iași; Știința Timișoara; Corvinul Hunedoara
- Relegated: Victoria Buzău; Metalul Oțelu Roșu; CFR Arad; Sportul Muncitoresc Radăuți; Carpați Sinaia; CS Târgu Mureș

The 1959–60 Divizia B was the 20th season of the second tier of the Romanian football league system.

The league was expanded from two series to three series of 14 teams. At the end of the season the winners of the series promoted to Divizia A and the last two places from each series relegated to Regional Championship.

== Team changes ==
=== To Divizia B ===
Promoted from Divizia C

- CFR Pașcani
- Victoria Buzău
- Știința București
- Chimia Făgăraș
- Rapid Cluj
- Metalul Oțelu Roșu
- Sportul Muncitoresc Radăuți
- SNM Constanța
- Jiul Craiova
- Carpați Sinaia
- CFR Cluj
- Drobeta-Turnu Severin
- Dinamo Miliție București
- Recolta Carei
- Metalul Târgoviște

Relegated from Divizia A

- Știința Timișoara

=== From Divizia B ===
Relegated to Regional Championship

- —

Promoted to Divizia A

- Minerul Lupeni

=== Other changes ===
CSA Sibiu was renamed ASA Sibiu.

Jiul Craiova was renamed CS Craiova.

Pompierul București was renamed Dinamo Obor București.

Victoria Suceava was renamed Dinamo Suceava.

Dinamo Miliție București and Dinamo Pitești merged, the first one being absorbed by the second one.

TAROM București merged with its mother club, Locomotiva GR București, being absorbed.

Știința Cluj was spared from relegation to Divizia B, after the merge of TAROM București with Locomotiva GR București.

== League tables ==
=== Serie I ===
Pos	Team	Pld	W	D	L	GF	GA	GD	Pts	Promotion or relegation
1	CSMS Iași (C, P)	26	19	4	3	79	24	+55	42	Promotion to Divizia A
2	Dinamo Galați	26	17	2	7	59	35	+24	36	
3	Prahova Ploiești	26	8	11	7	50	39	+11	27	
4	Dinamo Suceava	26	10	7	9	40	41	−1	27	
5	Știința București	26	10	5	11	51	38	+13	25	
6	SNM Constanța	26	9	7	10	36	40	−4	25	
7	Foresta Fălticeni	26	9	7	10	32	47	−15	25	
8	Unirea Iași	26	9	6	11	34	34	0	24	
9	Gloria Bistrița	26	9	6	11	33	36	−3	24	
10	CFR Pașcani	26	9	6	11	30	34	−4	24	
11	Unirea Focșani	26	7	10	9	32	47	−15	24	
12	Rulmentul Bârlad	26	10	4	12	31	49	−18	24	
13	Victoria Buzău (R)	26	7	7	12	32	41	−9	21	Relegation to Regional Championship
14	Sportul Muncitoresc Radăuți (R)	26	6	4	16	26	60	−34	16	Relegation to Regional Championship

Source: romaniansoccer.ro
Rules for classification: 1) Points 2) Head-to-head points; 3) Head-to-head goal difference; 4) Head-to-head goals scored; 5) Head-to-head away goals scored; 6) Goal difference; 7) Goals scored.
(C) Champions; (P) Promoted; (R) Relegated

=== Serie II ===
Pos	Team	Pld	W	D	L	GF	GA	GD	Pts	Promotion or relegation
1	Știința Timișoara (C, P)	26	17	4	5	60	20	+40	38	Promotion to Divizia A
2	Dinamo Obor București	26	13	7	6	44	33	+11	33	
3	Dinamo Pitești	26	13	5	8	50	41	+9	31	
4	Poiana Câmpina	26	11	6	9	29	29	0	28	
5	Flacăra Moreni	26	13	2	11	41	48	−7	28	
6	CFR Timișoara	26	11	5	10	45	34	+11	27	
7	Metalul Târgoviște	26	12	3	11	45	39	+6	27	
8	CS Craiova	26	10	6	10	33	46	−13	26	
9	Metalul Titanii București	26	11	3	12	35	40	−5	25	
10	Știința Craiova	26	10	4	12	33	29	+4	24	
11	CSM Reșița	26	10	3	13	51	40	+11	23	
12	Drobeta-Turnu Severin	26	8	5	13	39	54	−15	21	
13	Metalul Oțelu Roșu (R)	26	7	5	14	32	54	−22	19	Relegation to Regional Championship
14	Carpați Sinaia (R)	26	5	4	17	26	56	−30	14	Relegation to Regional Championship

Source: romaniansoccer.ro
Rules for classification: 1) Points 2) Head-to-head points; 3) Head-to-head goal difference; 4) Head-to-head goals scored; 5) Head-to-head away goals scored; 6) Goal difference; 7) Goals scored.
(C) Champions; (P) Promoted; (R) Relegated

=== Serie III ===
Pos	Team	Pld	W	D	L	GF	GA	GD	Pts	Promotion or relegation
1	Corvinul Hunedoara (C, P)	26	14	9	3	59	26	+33	37	Promotion to Divizia A
2	Baia Mare	26	15	6	5	53	24	+29	36	
3	CS Oradea	26	14	5	7	43	27	+16	33	
4	IS Câmpia Turzii	26	9	9	8	41	34	+7	27	
5	Recolta Carei	26	10	7	9	35	40	−5	27	
6	ASA Sibiu	26	7	12	7	35	31	+4	26	
7	Rapid Cluj	26	9	8	9	32	35	−3	26	
8	CFR Cluj	26	11	2	13	33	36	−3	24	
9	AMEFA Arad	26	9	5	12	26	33	−7	23	
10	Chimia Făgăraș	26	10	3	13	35	47	−12	23	
11	Gaz Metan Mediaș	26	7	9	10	25	42	−17	23	
12	Tractorul Orașul Stalin	26	6	10	10	27	28	−1	22	
13	CFR Arad (R)	26	8	4	14	23	35	−12	20	Relegation to Regional Championship
14	CS Târgu Mureș (R)	26	7	3	16	21	50	−29	17	Relegation to Regional Championship

Source: romaniansoccer.ro
Rules for classification: 1) Points 2) Head-to-head points; 3) Head-to-head goal difference; 4) Head-to-head goals scored; 5) Head-to-head away goals scored; 6) Goal difference; 7) Goals scored.
(C) Champions; (P) Promoted; (R) Relegated

== See also ==
- 1959–60 Divizia A
- 1959–60 Regional Championship
- 1959–60 Cupa României
