= CSM Bucovina Rădăuți =

Romanian football club

Bucovina Rădăuți
- Full name: Clubul Sportiv Municipal Bucovina Rădăuți
- Nicknames: Bucovinenii (The People from Bucovina); Rădăuțenii (The People from Rădăuți)
- Short name: Bucovina
- Founded: 1950; 76 years ago as Spartac Rădăuți; 2012; 14 years ago as CSM Bucovina Rădăuți
- Ground: Municipal
- Capacity: 2,000
- Owner: Rădăuți Municipality
- League: Liga IV
- 2025–26: Liga III, Seria I, 8th
Home colours	Away colours

Clubul Sportiv Municipal Bucovina Rădăuți, commonly known as Bucovina Rădăuți, is a Romanian professional football club based in Rădăuți, Romania, founded in 1956. Currently the team plays in Liga IV.

== History ==
Bucovina Rădăuți was founded in 1950 as Spartac Rădăuți, continuing the football tradition in Rădăuți that began before World War II with clubs such as Jahn Rădăuți, Hagwiruch Rădăuți, and Hatmanul Luca Arbore Rădăuți.

Renamed Progresul Rădăuți, the team finished as runners-up in the 1954 Suceava Regional Championship and earned promotion to the newly re-established Divizia C at the end of the 1955 season, after winning one of the regional championship series but losing the championship final to Dinamo Dorohoi.

In Divizia C, Progresul Rădăuți competed in Series I and finished 10th in the 1956 season. In the summer of 1957, the team was renamed Sportul Muncitoresc Rădăuți and went on to finish 6th in the 1957–58 season. Promotion to Divizia B was achieved at the end of the 1958–59 season after a 2nd place finish, and as the second division was expanded to three series while Divizia C was once again shut down.

In the second division, Bucovinenii lasted only one season, finishing last and being relegated to the regional championship. After relegation, the team merged with Metalul Rădăuți, a club supported by IMIL (Întreprinderea Metalurgică de Industrie Locală, lit. 'Local Industry Metallurgical Enterprise'), to form ASM Rădăuți. The newly formed team finished 1st in the 1960–61 Suceava Regional Championship but placed last in Series I of the promotion play-off, held in Râmnicu Vâlcea.

The club played under the name of Metalul Rădăuți, the name under which it competed throughout the communist period. In 1990, the club was renamed Bucovina Rădăuți, after the historical region in which the town of Rădăuți is located, and competed in Series I of Divizia C, finishing 4th in the 1990–91 and 1991–92 seasons, then 13th in the 1992–93 season, before being excluded during the first part of the 1993–94 campaign, with all its results subsequently canceled.

Bucovina Rădăuți returned to the third division at the end of the 2000–01 season, after winning Divizia D – Suceava County and securing promotion with a 1–0 victory in the play-off against Sirius Bodești, the champions of Neamț County.

In Divizia C, Bucovina narrowly avoided relegation in two consecutive seasons, finishing 14th out of 16 in both the 2001–02 and 2002–03 campaigns.

However, at the end of the 2003–04 season, Bucovina Rădăuți finished 12th out of 14 teams in Divizia C, which led to their relegation back to the fourth division. Despite several attempts in the following years, the team was unable to return to the third tier for a considerable period.

In the 2011–12 season, Bucovina Frătăuții Noi won the Liga IV – Suceava County and earned promotion to Liga III after defeating Pro Someș Feldru 3–1 in the play-off match. Then, in the summer of the same year, the team was moved from Frătăuții Noi to Rădăuți and renamed Bucovina Rădăuți, reviving the town's football tradition. Lucian Burlacu was appointed as the new head coach and led the team to an 8th-place finish in the first series of the 2012–13 Liga III season.

Bucovina started the 2013–14 season with Daniel Stoica as head coach, who guided the team to a 10th overall finish. Stoica resigned at the end of the first part of the following season and was replaced by veteran Ionel Ionesi, who secured 7th position in the table.

In the 2015–16 Liga III season, the team led by Ionesi finished the first part in 9th position without any concerns about relegation. However, Rădăuțenii encountered financial problems and withdrew from the league during the winter break.

In the summer of 2016, the team was enrolled in Liga IV – Suceava County with Ioan Lavric as head coach. He was replaced during the winter break by Daniel Bălan. After one year, Bucovina earned promotion back to Liga III by winning the county league title and defeating Bistrița-Năsăud County champions ACS Dumitra in the promotion play-off, 2–1 on aggregate (0–0 away and 2–1 at home).

== Honours ==
=== Leagues ===
Liga III:

- Winners (2): 2020–21, 2023–24
- Runners-up (2): 1958–59, 2018–19

Liga IV – Suceava County

- Winners (5): 1969–70, 1972–73, 1996–97, 2000–01, 2016–17
- Runners-up (1): 2008–09

==== Cups ====
Cupa României – Suceava County

- Winners (1): 2016–17

== Players ==
=== First team squad ===
As of 10 September 2024

Note: Flags indicate national team as defined under FIFA eligibility rules; some limited exceptions apply. Players may hold more than one non-FIFA nationality.

No.	Pos.	Nation	Player
1	GK	ROU	Ionuț Puianu
2	MF	ROU	Gabriel Derevlean
3	DF	ROU	Gabriel Rotaru
4	DF	RUS	Ianuș Jaman
5	MF	ROU	Valentin Zamă
6	MF	ROU	Daniel Bejenar (Captain)
7	MF	ROU	Adrian Stroe
8	MF	ROU	Ioan Anton
9	FW	ROU	Ionel Stoian
10	MF	ROU	Denis Bîzgă

No.	Pos.	Nation	Player
11	MF	ROU	Andrei Buceag
14	MF	ROU	Mugurel Florescu
16	MF	ROU	Alin Hrușcovschi
18	MF	ROU	Iulian Serediuc
27	FW	ROU	Iulian Coroamă
33	DF	ROU	Andrei Alecsandru
44	MF	ROU	David Gafencu
77	DF	ROU	Alexandru Ciobanu
93	GK	ROU	Cristian Butnariu
99	FW	ROU	Ioan Cîrloanță

=== Out on loan ===
Note: Flags indicate national team as defined under FIFA eligibility rules; some limited exceptions apply. Players may hold more than one non-FIFA nationality.

No. / Pos. / Nation / Player	No. / Pos. / Nation / Player

== Club officials ==
=== Board of directors ===
Role	Name
Owner	(Romania) Rădăuți Municipality
President	(Romania) Corneliu Lucescu
Executive Director	(Romania) Cosmin Nichiforiuc
Sporting director	(Romania) Vichentie Popescu
Accountant	(Romania) Ioan Cîmpan
Organizer of competitions	(Romania) Cezar Caunii
Stadium Administrator	(Romania) Dragoș Tătar
Photo Reporter	(Romania) Cristian Plosceac

=== Current technical staff ===
Role	Name
Manager	(Romania) Daniel Stoica
Assistant coach	(Romania) Radu Teleagă
Goalkeeping coach	(Romania) Cristian Butnariu
Club Doctors	(Romania) Adrian Popescu (Romania) Dănuț Lavric
Fitness Coach	(Romania) Adrian Levițchi

== League history ==
Season	Tier	Division	Place	Notes	Cupa României
2025–26	3	Liga III (Seria I)	TBD		
2024–25	3	Liga III (Seria I)	6th		Third round
2023–24	3	Liga III (Seria I)	1st (C)		Third round
2022–23	3	Liga III (Seria I)	4th		First round
2021–22	3	Liga III (Seria I)	4th		Second round
2020–21	3	Liga III (Seria I)	1st (C)		Second round
2019–20	3	Liga III (Seria I)	4th		Third round
2018–19	3	Liga III (Seria I)	2nd		Round of 32

Season	Tier	Division	Place	Notes	Cupa României
2017–18	3	Liga III (Seria I)	5th		First round
2016–17	4	Liga IV (SV)	1st (C)	Promoted	
2015–16	3	Liga III (Seria I)	12th	Relegated	
2014–15	3	Liga III (Seria I)	7th		
2013–14	3	Liga III (Seria I)	10th		
2012–13	3	Liga III (Seria I)	8th		
2011–12	4	Liga IV (SV)	1st (C)	Promoted	

== Former managers ==
- (Romania) Teofil Codreanu (1984–1986)
- (Romania) Lucian Burlacu (2012–2013)
- (Romania) Daniel Stoica (2013–2014)
- (Romania) Ionel Ionesi (2015–2016)
- (Romania) Ioan Lavric (2016)
- (Romania) Daniel Bălan (2017)
- (Romania) Dorin Goian (2017–2020)
- (Romania) Ionel Ionesi (2020–2021)
- (Romania) Ionuț Plămadă (2021–2023)
- (Romania) Marius Lup (2023–2025)
- (Romania) Daniel Stoica (2025–)
