= CSM Victoria Carei =

Association football club in Romania

Victoria Carei
- Full name: Club Sportiv Municipal; Victoria Carei
- Nicknames: Alb-negrii (The White and Blacks); Careienii (The People from Carei)
- Founded: 1923; 103 years ago
- Ground: Victoria
- Capacity: 4,000 (400 seated)
- Owner: Carei Municipality
- Chairman: Zsolt Tabi
- Head coach: Zsolt Tabi
- League: Liga IV
- 2025–26: Liga IV, Satu Mare County, 6th of 8
Home colours	Away colours

Club Sportiv Municipal Victoria Carei, commonly known as Victoria Carei, is a Romanian football club based in Carei, Satu Mare County and currently playing in the Liga IV – Satu Mare County, the fourth tier of the Romanian football.

Founded in 1923, Victoria Carei played sixteen seasons in the second division between 1935 and 1988 and thirty-seven seasons in the third division between 1946 and 2024. Their highest league finish was 3rd place in the 1935–36 season of Divizia B.

== History ==
=== First years and ascension (1923–1990) ===
After the end of World War I and the Union of Transylvania with Romania, ratified in 1920 by the Treaty of Trianon, football activities resumed starting with the 1920–21 season. The teams from Satu Mare County took part in the Oradea District Championship, within the Northern Regional League, with the city of Carei being represented in the early seasons by Club Atletic Carei.

Victoria Carei was founded in 1923 and competed in the Maramureș District Championship, finishing in 4th place in its first season. The team earned promotion to the Romanian second division at the end of the 1934–35 season, winning the Satu Mare District Championship and clinching the North League title by defeating Astra Sighet (4–1), Macabi Oradea (2–0), and CM Cluj (4–2) in the final. In the promotion/relegation play-off, Victoria faced Ceramica Bistrița, the last-placed team from Series III of Divizia B, securing a 1–0 victory away and following up with a decisive 3–0 win at home. The squad, coached by Muller, included players such as Corodi, Prunar, Stier II, Sabău, Danca, Albu, Tătar, Filipescu, Stier I, Almași and Hragyel.

Victoria Carei made its Divizia B debut in the 1935–36 season of Divizia B, finishing in a respectable 3rd place on the league table. Follow another four consecutive seasons in the second division: 1936–37 - 13th place; 1937–38 - 9th place; 1938–39 - 8th place and 1939–40 in which withdrew at the start of the second half and lost the remaining nine matches with 0–3, ranking last and relegated. Also qualified to the second round proper of the 1937–38 Cupa României, eliminated after losing 0–7 with Unirea Tricolor București.

Victoria Carei moved in the Hungarian football league system due to the Second Vienna Award which was signed on 30 August 1940, territory of Northern Transylvania being assigned from Romania to Hungary.

Renamed Victoria CFR Carei, the club returned to the Romanian football league system for 1946–47 Divizia C, the first season of the third division after the World War II, finishing 6th in the Series VI. With the exception of the 1948–49 Divizia C season, in which it finished 4th in Series II of Divizia C, the team from Carei, renamed in the meanwhile as CFR and then as Recolta, played in the following seasons in the Regional Championship, due to the Divizia C was not organized until 1956.

Followed three seasons in the third tier, in which Recolta was ranked as follows: 10th in 1956 season, 10th in 1957–58 season and 3rd at the end of 1958–59 season. Due to expansion of second division from two series to three series of 14 teams, the teams ranked 3rd in all six series of Divizia C played a promotion play-off, Recolta promoted to Divizia B, after nineteen years of absence, after 1–1 with Aurul Brad and 1–0 with Textila Sfântu Gheorghe. The club remained in the second division for the next four seasons finished 5th in 1959–60, 9th in 1960–61, 9th in 1961–62 and 11th in 1962–63 relegated to the third division due to another format change of the second tier.

The 1963–64 season saw the club promoted back to second division winning the North Series of Divizia C and reached the first round proper of Cupa României losing 0–4 to Rapid București.

In the 1964–65 season in Divizia B finishing 12th barely avoided relegation and reached again the first round of Cupa României this time losing 0–1 in front of Farul Constanța. The following year Recolta were relegated to Divizia C at goal difference, finishing in 13th place out of 14 with 21 points tied with Minerul Lupeni and CSM Sibiu.

In the 1966–67 season occupied the 3rd place in the North Series of the third division, and in the summer of 1967, the club reverted to its old name, Victoria Carei, finishing again in 3rd position at the end of the 1967–68 season.

=== Ups and downs (1970–2007) ===
In the next four seasons, the club continue to challenge for promotion, finishing 2nd in 1968–69 and 1969–70 seasons, 3rd in 1970–71 and 1st in 1971–72 season, missing the promotion after lost the play-off played against Metrom Brașov (1–3) and Industria Sârmei Câmpia Turzii (0–4).

In the 1972–73 season, Victoria Carei earned promotion to Divizia B, ending seven consecutive seasons in the third tier after winning the tenth series of Divizia C. The squad, coached by Alexandru Papp, included players such as Silviu Lung, Ștefan Feher, Gheorghe Erdei, József Vancsa, Tibor Újvári, Lajos Keizer, Árpád Bereczki, Alexandru Nagy, Árpád Danka, Ștefan Béres, Ștefan Fésús, Tibor Szabó, A. Budai, and L. Fésús.

Victoria spent the next three seasons in the second division finishing 7th in 1973–74 season, 14th in 1974–75 season and 17th in 1975–76 season relegated back to third division. The 1976–77 campaign saw the club win the tenth series of Divizia C secured an immediate return to the second division. However, at the end of the next season they were relegated again after finishing 17th out of 18.

Victoria stayed in Divizia C nine consecutive seasons: In 1978–79 finished on 9th place and qualified to the first round proper of the Cupa României being eliminated after losing 0–1 to Sportul Studențesc, the next season unsuccessfully contested the promotion finishing on 2nd place 3 points behind CIL Sighetu Marmației, the 5th position from 1980–81 season follows two second places, in 1981–82 four points behind Armătura Zalău and 1982–83 at just one points behind Steaua CFR Cluj-Napoca, 12th place 1983–84, 4th place in 1984–85, 5th place in 1985–86 and 3rd place in 1986–87. In the summer of 1987, due to the merger between Unio Satu Mare and Olimpia Satu Mare, Victoria Carei took the place of Unio in 1987–88 season of Divizia B, suffering an immediately relegation ranking last in his series.

In the next seasons of Divizia C, Victoria was a top-table finisher team, but not a serious contender for promotion, ranking as follows: 8th (1988–89), 6th (1989–90), 4th (1990–91), 4th (1991–92), 8th (1992–93), but at the end of 1993–94 season finished in 19th place out of 20 and relegated to the fourth division. In the 1996–97 season, Victoria Carei won the Divizia D – Satu Mare County and promoted to Divizia C after defeating the winner of Divizia D – Maramureș County, Progresul Șomcuta Mare, 1–0 in the promotion play-off.

The presence in the third division was short, at the end of the 1997–98 season relegated back to the fourth division after finished 16th in the fourth series. In the 2001–02 season, Victoria Carei promoted again to the third division after won Divizia D – Satu Mare County and after beating Rapid Jibou, the winner of Divizia D – Sălaj County, 3–0 in the promotion play-off.

In Divizia C, Victoria finished two seasons at the mid-table, 8th in 2002–03 and 7th in 2003–04, and two seasons as runners-up in 2004–05 and 2005–06, before relegated again to Liga IV, at the end of the 2006–07 season, after finishing 16th out of 18.

=== County leagues (2007–2022) ===
With Florin Fabian as player-coach, Victoria won the Liga IV – Satu Mare County in the 2007–08 season but missed promotion to the third league after losing the promotion play-off 1–3 to Liberty II Marghita, the winner of Liga IV – Bihor County.

In the 2008–09 season, under the guidance of Zsolt Tabi, Victoria won Series B of Liga IV – Satu Mare County but lost the county league final 1–2 against the Series A winner, Turul Micula, at Olimpia Stadium in Satu Mare. Tabi led the team from Carei to once again claim the Liga IV – Satu Mare County title in the 2009–10 season but lost the promotion play-off 0–4 to Spicul Mocira, the Liga IV – Maramureș County winner.

The following season brought significant changes to Carei, with Alexandru Bagossyi appointed as the new head coach. The club signed several new players and promoted from the youth squads, aiming to recover from financial struggles and debt. However, Victoria finished 3rd in Series B in the 2010–11 season and ended the following season in 13th place. In the summer of 2012, Victoria withdrew from Liga IV and entered a two-year hiatus, remaining active only at the junior level.

The 2018–19 campaign started with Ioan Dragomir as the new head coach, but he was replaced during the winter break by Marius Botan, who led Victoria to a 2nd-place finish in Series C and 2nd place in the play-in round group for a spot in the championship semifinals.

Marius Botan continued in charge during the 2019–20 campaign, with the White and Blacks sitting in 2nd place in Series C at the time of the interruption caused by the COVID-19 pandemic, which was later concluded after AJF Satu Mare decided that teams could not comply with the conditions imposed by the medical protocol.

Victoria won the 2020–21 Liga IV – Satu Mare County title, but missed promotion after losing 0–3 on neutral ground at Gaz Metan Stadium in Mediaș to Real Bradu, the winners of Liga IV – Argeș County, in the preliminary round of the promotion play-off. The squad led by Marius Botan consisted of Mitracica, Menesi, Mihale, Dascăl, G. Griszhaber, Orosz, D. Griszhaber, Tilinger, Kinczel, Ghiarfaș, Bakai, I. Mihai, Zbona, Vereș, Szabolcs, Nagy, Holczberger, Krajczar, Schuller, and Veszpremi.

=== Back in the national leagues (2022–present) ===
After fifteen years in the fourth division, Victoria Carei, under the guidance of Marius Botan, was promoted to Liga III after winning the 2021–22 Liga IV Satu Mare County and the promotion play-off against Supporter 2.0 Cluj-Napoca (1–1 at Cluj and 3–0 at Carei), the winner of Liga IV – Cluj County.

In the 2022–23 season of Liga III, Victoria finished 9th in the regular season and narrowly avoided relegation, ranking 8th in the relegation play-out of Series X. In the 2023–24 season, Victoria improved to 6th in the regular season and finished 5th overall after the play-out round. However, after two seasons in the third division, Victoria withdrew due to financial problems and returned to Liga IV – Satu Mare County.

== Honours ==
Liga III

- Winners (4): 1963–64, 1971–72, 1972–73, 1976–77
- Runners-up (7): 1968–69, 1969–70, 1979–80, 1981–82, 1982–83, 2004–05, 2005–06

Liga IV – Satu Mare County

- Winners (6): 1996–97, 2001–02, 2007–08, 2009–10, 2020–21, 2021–22
- Runners-up (2): 2008–09, 2016–17

== Club officials ==
=== Board of directors ===
Role	Name
Owner	(Romania) Carei Municipality
President	(Romania) Zsolt Tabi

=== Current technical staff ===
Role	Name
Manager	(Romania) Zsolt Tabi

== League history ==
Season	Tier	Division	Place	Notes	Cupa României
2024–25	4	Liga IV (SM)	TBD		
2023–24	3	Liga III (Seria X)	5th	Withdrew	
2022–23	3	Liga III (Seria X)	8th		
2021–22	4	Liga IV (SM)	1st (C)	Promoted	
2020–21	4	Liga IV (SM) (Seria B)	1st (C)		
2019–20	4	Liga IV (SM) (Seria C)	2nd		
2018–19	4	Liga IV (SM) (Seria C)	2nd		
2017–18	4	Liga IV (SM)	5th		

Season	Tier	Division	Place	Notes	Cupa României
2016–17	4	Liga IV (SM)	2nd		
2015–16	4	Liga IV (SM)	7th		
2014–15	5	Liga V (SM) (Seria B)	6th		
2012–14	Active only at junior level.				
2011–12	4	Liga IV (SM) (Seria B)	13th		
2010–11	4	Liga IV (SM) (Seria B)	3rd		
2009–10	4	Liga IV (SM) (Seria B)	1st (C)		
