= 1957–58 Regional Championship =

16th season of the Liga IV, the fourth tier of the Romanian football league

Liga IV
- Season: 1957–58

The 1957–58 Regional Championship was the 16th season of the Regional Championship, the fourth tier of the Romanian football league system.

The promotion play-off did not take place this season as the top teams from each regional championships were promoted to Divizia C.

== Regional championships ==
- Baia Mare (BM)
- Bacău (BC)
- Bucharest Municipality (B)
- Bucharest Region (B)
- Cluj (CJ)
- Constanța (CT)
- Craiova (CR)
- Galați (GL)
- Hunedoara (HD)
- Iași (IS)
- Mureș (MS)
- Oradea (OR)
- Pitești (PI)
- Ploiești (PL)
- Stalin (ST)
- Suceava (SV)
- Timișoara (TM)

== Championships standings ==
=== Baia Mare Region ===
Pos	Team	Pld	W	D	L	GF	GA	GD	Pts	Qualification or relegation
1	Stăruința Satu Mare (C, Q)	26	23	1	2	93	13	+80	47	Promotion to Divizia C
2	Chimistul Baia Mare	26	20	4	2	79	14	+65	44	
3	Minerul Baia Sprie	26	13	5	8	42	32	+10	31	
4	Progresul Vișeu de Sus	26	14	2	10	45	42	+3	30	
5	Topitorul Ferneziu	26	12	5	9	46	48	−2	29	
6	Voința Tășnad	26	12	3	11	39	34	+5	27	
7	Voința Carei	26	11	5	10	41	42	−1	27	
8	Recolta Bixad	26	12	1	13	40	44	−4	25	
9	Progresul Cehu Silvaniei	26	9	7	10	53	46	+7	25	
10	Stăruința Sighetu Marmației	26	9	5	12	34	43	−9	23	
11	Minerul Săsar	26	7	9	10	32	52	−20	23	
12	Unirea Seini	26	6	10	10	32	52	−20	22	
13	Rapid Satu Mare	26	4	2	20	22	69	−47	10	
14	Recolta Vișeu de Sus	26	0	0	26	2	76	−74	0	

Rules for classification: 1) points; 2) goal difference; 3) number of goals scored.
(C) Champions; (Q) Qualified for the phase indicated

=== Bucharest Region ===
Pos	Team	Pld	W	D	L	GF	GA	GD	Pts	Qualification or relegation
1	Oltul Turnu Măgurele (C, P)	24	17	3	4	68	21	+47	37	Promotion to Divizia C
2	CFR Roșiori	24	15	2	7	50	31	+19	32	
3	Progresul Alexandria	24	11	7	6	47	37	+10	29	
4	Șantierul Naval Oltenița	24	12	4	8	40	37	+3	28	
5	Dunărea Giurgiu	24	11	5	8	48	32	+16	27	
6	Olimpia Călărași	24	11	5	8	48	32	+16	27	
7	Sporting Roșiori	24	12	2	10	53	54	−1	26	
8	Gloria Necșești	24	8	8	8	47	42	+5	24	
9	Unirea Mânăstirea	24	9	5	10	39	42	−3	23	
10	Voința Călărași	24	6	10	8	36	43	−7	22	
11	Ialomița Nouă Slobozia	24	7	4	13	45	51	−6	18	
12	Energia Buftea	24	6	2	16	34	54	−20	14	
13	Voința Alexandria	24	2	1	21	22	92	−70	5	
14	Recolta Lehliu (Note: Recolta Lehliu was excluded in the first part of the season and all its results were canceled.) (D)	0	0	0	0	0	0	0	0	Excluded

Rules for classification: 1) points; 2) goal difference; 3) number of goals scored.
(C) Champions; (D) Disqualified; (P) Promoted

=== Galați Region ===
Teams changes from previous season

Relegated from Divizia C

- Voința Tecuci

Promoted to Divizia C

- Energia Metalul Galați

Other changes

- Energia 11 Iunie Galați was renamed during the winter break as Tehnometal Galați.
- Locomotiva Brăila was renamed during the winter break as Dunărea Brăila.
- Energia IS Brăila was renamed during the winter break as Industria Sârmei Brăila.
- Energia IMD Brăila was renamed during the winter break as IMD Brăila.
- Energia UMP Brăila was renamed during the winter break as UMP Brăila.
- Flamura Roșie Ghidigeni was renamed during the winter break as Muncitorul Ghidigeni.
- Locomotiva Mărășești was renamed during the winter break as FC Mărășești.

Pos	Team	Pld	W	D	L	GF	GA	GD	Pts	Qualification or relegation
1	Industria Sârmei Brăila (C, P)	24	22	2	0	93	14	+79	46	Promotion to Divizia C
2	IMD Brăila	24	18	3	3	67	14	+53	39	
3	Progresul Naval Brăila	24	18	2	4	83	26	+57	38	
4	Dunărea Brăila	24	13	4	7	64	46	+18	30	
5	UMP Brăila	24	12	5	7	62	33	+29	29	
6	Recolta Făurei	24	13	2	9	59	40	+19	28	
7	Muncitorul Ghidigeni	24	8	6	10	43	59	−16	22	
8	Voința Galați	24	7	7	10	32	41	−9	21	
9	Voința Tecuci	24	7	2	15	35	62	−27	16	
10	Tehnometal Galați	24	6	2	16	27	60	−33	14	
11	Mărășești	24	4	4	16	27	67	−40	12	
12	Recolta Ianca	24	5	1	18	31	95	−64	11	
13	Recolta Ivești	24	2	2	20	15	82	−67	6	
14	Recolta Odobești (Note: Recolta Odobești was excluded in the first part of the season and all its results were canceled.) (D)	0	0	0	0	0	0	0	0	Excluded

Rules for classification: 1) points; 2) goal difference; 3) number of goals scored.
(C) Champions; (D) Disqualified; (P) Promoted

=== Hunedoara Region ===
Pos	Team	Pld	W	D	L	GF	GA	GD	Pts	Qualification or relegation
1	CFR Simeria (C, P)	26	17	3	6	81	31	+50	37	Promotion to Divizia C
2	Minerul Aninoasa	26	15	3	8	65	29	+36	33	
3	Șurianul Sebeș	26	13	7	6	46	25	+21	33	
4	Parângul Lonea	26	14	4	8	81	44	+37	32	
5	Aurul Zlatna	26	14	1	11	50	51	−1	29	
6	Unirea Alba Iulia	26	12	3	11	34	41	−7	27	
7	Corvinul Deva	26	11	3	12	41	53	−12	25	
8	Metalul Cugir	26	10	4	12	41	48	−7	24	
9	Victoria Călan	26	10	4	12	44	52	−8	24	
10	Dinamo Orăștie	26	9	5	12	32	43	−11	23	
11	Constructorul Hunedoara	26	11	1	14	37	59	−22	23	
12	Minerul Vulcan	26	6	9	11	45	56	−11	21	
13	CFR Teiuș	26	6	6	14	35	67	−32	18	
14	Minerul Ghelar	26	6	3	17	28	61	−33	15	

Rules for classification: 1) points; 2) goal difference; 3) number of goals scored.
(C) Champions; (P) Promoted

=== Oradea Region ===
Teams changes from previous season

Relegated from Divizia C

- Locomotiva Oradea

Promoted to Divizia C

- Flamura Roșie Oradea

Other changes

- Flamura Roșie Salonta was renamed as Voința Salonta.
- Locomotiva Oradea was renamed during the winter break as Gloria CFR Oradea.
- Progresul Ineu was renamed during the winter break as Crișul Ineu.
- Flamura Roșie Valea lui Mihai was renamed during the winter break as Spartac Valea lui Mihai.
- Progresul Șimleu Silvaniei was renamed during the winter break as Măgura Șimleu Silvaniei.
- Recolta Marghita was renamed during the winter break as Victoria Marghita.
- Flamura Roșie Sebiș was renamed during the winter break as Crișana Sebiș.

Pos	Team	Pld	W	D	L	GF	GA	GD	Pts	Qualification or relegation
1	Gloria CFR Oradea (P)	26	18	4	4	85	20	+65	40	Promotion to Divizia C
2	Biharia Vașcău	26	17	3	6	53	24	+29	37	
3	Granit Dr. Petru Groza	26	12	7	7	35	30	+5	31	
4	Recolta Săcuieni	26	13	4	9	69	34	+35	30	
5	Electrica Oradea	26	13	4	9	40	34	+6	30	
6	Dinamo Oradea	26	11	5	10	44	33	+11	27	
7	Crișul Ineu	26	12	3	11	42	47	−5	27	
8	Spartac Valea lui Mihai	26	8	9	9	43	36	+7	25	
9	Măgura Șimleu Silvaniei	26	10	4	12	41	44	−3	24	
10	Voința Oradea	25	9	5	11	44	54	−10	23	
11	Victoria Marghita	26	8	5	13	35	56	−21	21	
12	Voința Salonta	26	6	4	16	38	71	−33	16	
13	Crișana Sebiș (Note: Crișana Sebiș was spared from relegation due to the merger between Voința Oradea and Flamura Roșie Oradea.)	25	4	6	15	35	64	−29	14	Spared from relegation
14	Progresul Aleșd (R)	26	3	5	18	34	84	−50	11	Relegation to Oradea District Championship

Rules for classification: 1) points; 2) goal difference; 3) number of goals scored.
(P) Promoted; (R) Relegated

=== Ploiești Region ===
Pos	Team	Pld	W	D	L	GF	GA	GD	Pts	Qualification or relegation
1	Rapid Plopeni (C, P)	28	23	2	3	91	28	+63	48	Promotion to Divizia C
2	CFR Buzău	28	19	4	5	74	23	+51	42	
3	Cimentul Fieni	28	15	9	4	76	30	+46	39	
4	Olimpia Pucioasa	28	16	2	10	53	42	+11	34	
5	Unirea Azuga	28	14	4	10	55	32	+23	32	
6	Mecano-Petrol Moreni	28	12	6	10	52	44	+8	30	
7	Zefir Brănești	28	12	5	11	56	50	+6	29	
8	Petrolul Ochiuri	28	9	8	11	53	52	+1	26	
9	Petrolul Teleajen Ploiești	28	9	7	12	32	57	−25	25	
10	Metalul Mija	28	9	5	14	44	60	−16	23	
11	Tricolor Ploiești	28	9	5	14	46	67	−21	23	
12	Petrolul Băicoi	28	7	8	13	40	59	−19	22	
13	Muncitorul Schela Mare	28	6	9	13	45	59	−14	21	
14	Voința Râmnicu Sărat	28	6	4	18	36	71	−35	16	
15	Petrolistul Boldești	28	4	2	22	26	105	−79	10	

Rules for classification: 1) points; 2) goal difference; 3) number of goals scored.
(C) Champions; (P) Promoted

=== Stalin Region ===
Pos	Team	Pld	W	D	L	GF	GA	GD	Pts	Qualification or relegation
1	Chimia Făgăraș (P)	26	15	9	2	75	26	+49	39	Promotion to Divizia C
2	Metrom Orașul Stalin	26	16	6	4	67	21	+46	38	
3	Independența Sibiu	26	14	6	6	55	38	+17	34	
4	Victoria Copșa Mică	26	13	5	8	34	23	+11	31	
5	Vitrometan Mediaș	26	11	6	9	33	33	0	28	
6	Măgura Codlea	26	10	7	9	33	39	−6	27	
7	IAS Orașul Stalin	26	9	8	9	39	39	0	26	
8	Locomotiva Sighișoara	26	10	5	11	47	57	−10	25	
9	Textila Mediaș	26	10	4	12	39	46	−7	24	
10	Voința Târnăveni	26	10	4	12	38	52	−14	24	
11	Celuloza Zărnești	26	8	5	13	38	43	−5	21	
12	Electroprecizia Săcele	26	7	6	13	36	52	−16	20	
13	Record Mediaș	25	6	6	13	26	41	−15	18	
14	Politehnica Orașul Stalin	25	3	1	21	17	67	−50	7	

Rules for classification: 1) points; 2) goal difference; 3) number of goals scored.
(P) Promoted

=== Suceava Region ===
Pos	Team	Pld	W	D	L	GF	GA	GD	Pts	Qualification or relegation
1	Minerul Câmpulung Moldovenesc (C, P)	22	19	1	2	85	16	+69	39	Promotion to Divizia C
2	Dinamo Botoșani	22	19	1	2	87	27	+60	39	
3	Avântul Frasin	22	16	3	3	57	18	+39	35	
4	Minerul Vatra Dornei	22	14	1	7	50	33	+17	29	
5	Recolta Rădăuți	22	11	1	10	54	46	+8	23	
6	Energia Moldovița	22	9	1	12	37	40	−3	19	
7	CFR Ițcani	22	7	4	11	33	67	−34	18	
8	Recolta Albești (Note: Recolta Albești and Bradul Vama were excluded in the second part of the season and lost all remaining matches with 0–3.)	22	7	1	14	32	61	−29	15	
9	Voința Vatra Dornei	22	6	2	14	34	63	−29	14	
10	Recolta Siret	22	6	2	14	23	55	−32	14	
11	Voința Botoșani	22	6	1	15	46	62	−16	13	
12	Bradul Vama	22	2	2	18	16	66	−50	6	

Rules for classification: 1) points; 2) goal difference; 3) number of goals scored.
(C) Champions; (P) Promoted

== See also ==
- 1957–58 Divizia A
- 1957–58 Divizia B
- 1957–58 Divizia C
- 1957–58 Cupa României
