= 1957–58 Divizia B =

Divizia B
- Season: 1957–58
- Promoted: Știința Cluj; Farul Constanța
- Relegated: Partizanul Reghin; Progresul CPCS București; CFR Cluj; CSU București

The 1957–58 Divizia B was the 18th season of the second tier of the Romanian football league system.

The format with two series has been maintained, both of them having 14 teams. At the end of the season the winners of the series promoted to Divizia A, the last two places from each series relegated to Divizia C. This was the first season played in the autumn-spring system, after seven seasons played in the spring-autumn system, a system imposed by the Soviet influence existing in the country.

== Team changes ==
=== To Divizia B ===
Promoted from Divizia C

- Foresta Fălticeni
- Locomotiva MCF București
- Energia Baia Mare
- Metalul Arad

Relegated from Divizia A

- Locomotiva Timișoara
- Știința Cluj
- Dinamo Bacău

=== From Divizia B ===
Relegated to Divizia C

- Progresul Satu Mare
- Locomotiva Iași
- Locomotiva Turnu Severin
- Flamura Roșie Bacău

Promoted to Divizia A

- Recolta Târgu Mureș
- Metalul Steagul Roșu

=== Renamed teams ===
Avântul Reghin was renamed as Partizanul Reghin.

Dinamo 6 București was renamed as Dinamo Obor București.

Energia 1 Mai Ploiești was renamed as Prahova Ploiești.

Energia Baia Mare was renamed as Minerul Baia Mare.

Energia Câmpia Turzii was renamed as IS Câmpia Turzii.

Energia Câmpina was renamed as Poiana Câmpina.

Energia Hunedoara was renamed as Corvinul Hunedoara.

Energia Mediaș was renamed as Gaz Metan Mediaș.

Locomotiva Arad was renamed as CFR Arad.

Locomotiva Cluj was renamed as CFR Cluj.

Locomotiva Constanța was renamed as Farul Constanța.

Locomotiva MCF București was renamed as Rapid II București.

Locomotiva Timișoara was renamed as CFR Timișoara.

Metalul Arad was renamed as AMEF Arad.

Metalul Tractorul Orașul Stalin was renamed as Tractorul Orașul Stalin.

Progresul Focșani was renamed as Unirea Focșani.

Știința București was renamed as CSU București.

=== Other teams ===
Flamura Roşie Burdujeni was moved from Burdujeni to Suceava and merged with the local team forming a new club, Progresul Suceava.

== League tables ==
=== Serie I ===
Pos	Team	Pld	W	D	L	GF	GA	GD	Pts	Promotion or relegation
1	Știința Cluj (C, P)	26	17	3	6	58	23	+35	37	Promotion to Divizia A
2	Corvinul Hunedoara	26	15	6	5	52	25	+27	36	
3	IS Câmpia Turzii	26	13	6	7	48	32	+16	32	
4	Minerul Baia Mare	26	12	7	7	52	50	+2	31	
5	Progresul Sibiu	26	13	3	10	57	47	+10	29	
6	Minerul Lupeni	26	9	9	8	53	41	+12	27	
7	AMEF Arad	26	9	9	8	24	35	−11	27	
8	CFR Arad	26	9	7	10	33	42	−9	25	
9	CFR Timișoara	26	9	6	11	36	41	−5	24	
10	Metalul Reșița	26	10	3	13	50	45	+5	23	
11	Tractorul Orașul Stalin	26	9	5	12	41	39	+2	23	
12	Gaz Metan Mediaș	26	8	6	12	20	29	−9	22	
13	Partizanul Reghin (R)	26	6	5	15	27	62	−35	17	Relegation to Divizia C
14	CFR Cluj (R)	26	3	5	18	31	71	−40	11	Relegation to Divizia C

Source: romaniansoccer.ro
Rules for classification: 1) Points 2) Head-to-head points; 3) Head-to-head goal difference; 4) Head-to-head goals scored; 5) Head-to-head away goals scored; 6) Goal difference; 7) Goals scored.
(C) Champions; (P) Promoted; (R) Relegated

=== Serie II ===
Pos	Team	Pld	W	D	L	GF	GA	GD	Pts	Promotion or relegation
1	Farul Constanța (C, P)	26	16	6	4	68	30	+38	38	Promotion to Divizia A
2	Dinamo Bacău	26	13	8	5	64	25	+39	34	
3	Rapid II București	26	13	5	8	46	28	+18	31	
4	Știința Iași	26	10	9	7	35	44	−9	29	
5	Dinamo Obor București	26	9	8	9	50	42	+8	26	
6	Dinamo Bârlad	26	10	6	10	39	51	−12	26	
7	Foresta Fălticeni	26	10	6	10	29	40	−11	26	
8	Prahova Ploiești	26	8	7	11	42	47	−5	23	
9	Flacăra Moreni	26	8	7	11	38	44	−6	23	
10	Poiana Câmpina	26	8	7	11	36	44	−8	23	
11	Progresul Suceava	26	8	7	11	30	40	−10	23	
12	Unirea Focșani	26	10	3	13	35	50	−15	23	
13	Progresul CPCS București (R)	26	7	6	13	36	49	−13	20	Relegation to Divizia C
14	CSU București (R)	26	7	5	14	37	51	−14	19	Relegation to Divizia C

Source: romaniansoccer.ro
Rules for classification: 1) Points 2) Head-to-head points; 3) Head-to-head goal difference; 4) Head-to-head goals scored; 5) Head-to-head away goals scored; 6) Goal difference; 7) Goals scored.
(C) Champions; (P) Promoted; (R) Relegated

== See also ==
- 1957–58 Divizia A
