= 1956 Regional Championship =

15th season of the Liga IV, the fourth tier of the Romanian football league

Liga IV
- Season: 1956

The 1956 Regional Championship was the 15th season of the Regional Championship, the fourth tier of the Romanian football league system.

The promotion play-off did not take place this season. The winners of the each regional championship series were promoted to the 1957–58 Divizia C, as each series of the third tier was expanded from twelve to fourteen teams.

== Regional championships ==
- Arad (AR)
- Bacău (BC)
- Baia Mare (BM)
- Bârlad (BD)
- Bucharest Municipality (B)
- Bucharest Region (B)
- Cluj (CJ)
- Constanța (CT)
- Craiova (CR)
- Galați (GL)
- Hunedoara (HD)
- Iași (IS)
- Mureș (MS)
- Oradea (OR)
- Pitești (PI)
- Ploiești (PL)
- Stalin (ST)
- Suceava (SV)
- Timișoara (TM)

== Championships standings ==
=== Baia Mare Region ===
Pos	Team	Pld	W	D	L	GF	GA	GD	Pts	Qualification or relegation
1	Dinamo Baia Mare (C, P)	26	21	3	2	77	18	+59	45	Promotion to Divizia C
2	Energia IC Baia Mare	26	18	2	6	52	20	+32	38	
3	Metalul Unio Satu Mare	26	14	8	4	52	29	+23	36	
4	Energia Józsa Béla Baia Sprie	26	15	2	9	53	42	+11	32	
5	Recolta Oaș Bixad	26	13	5	8	49	33	+16	31	
6	Voința Sighetu Marmației	26	12	6	8	43	35	+8	30	
7	Voința Carei	26	11	5	10	46	39	+7	27	
8	Progresul Cehu Silvaniei	26	12	3	11	54	52	+2	27	
9	Progresul Vișeu de Sus	26	10	6	10	36	47	−11	26	
10	Recolta Vișeu de Sus	26	9	5	12	44	50	−6	23	
11	Recolta Tășnad	26	10	3	13	44	53	−9	23	
12	Energia 1 Mai Baia Mare	26	6	4	16	24	46	−22	16	
13	Recolta Satu Mare	26	3	2	21	19	63	−44	8	
14	Voința Baia Mare	26	0	2	24	10	76	−66	2	

Rules for classification: 1) points; 2) goal difference; 3) number of goals scored.
(C) Champions; (P) Promoted

=== Galați Region ===
Series I

Pos	Team	Pld	W	D	L	GF	GA	GD	Pts	Qualification or relegation
1	Energia Metalul Galați (Q)	16	15	0	1	74	4	+70	30	Qualification to championship final
2	Energia IMD Brăila	16	14	1	1	44	10	+34	29	
3	Progresul Naval Brăila	16	8	2	6	35	25	+10	18	
4	Flamura Roșie Ghidigeni	16	7	2	7	31	37	−6	16	
5	Locomotiva Brăila	16	7	1	8	34	29	+5	15	
6	Recolta Odobești	16	6	1	9	24	32	−8	13	
7	Progresul Galați	16	5	2	9	33	44	−11	12	
8	Progresul Panciu	16	4	3	9	21	53	−32	11	
9	Recolta Urechești	16	0	0	16	16	68	−52	0	

Rules for classification: 1) points; 2) goal difference; 3) number of goals scored.
(Q) Qualified for the phase indicated

Series II

Pos	Team	Pld	W	D	L	GF	GA	GD	Pts	Qualification or relegation
1	Energia UM Progresul Brăila (Q)	16	16	0	0	61	13	+48	32	Qualification to championship final
2	Recolta Făurei	16	12	1	3	54	17	+37	25	
3	Locomotiva Mărășești	16	7	4	5	29	23	+6	18	
4	Energia 11 Iunie Galați	16	8	1	7	34	33	+1	17	
5	Energia Construcții Galați	16	7	2	7	33	37	−4	16	
6	Locomotiva Măcin	16	5	1	10	24	28	−4	11	
7	Dinamo Brăila	16	5	0	11	21	49	−28	10	
8	Recolta Galați	16	2	2	12	13	48	−35	6	
9	Avântul Gugești	16	2	1	13	10	43	−33	5	

Rules for classification: 1) points; 2) goal difference; 3) number of goals scored.
(Q) Qualified for the phase indicated

Championship final

The match was played on 14 October 1956 at Progresul Stadium in Focșani.

Team 1	Score	Team 2
Energia Metalul Galați	1–0	UM Progresul Brăila

Energia Metalul Galați won the Galați Regional Championship and promoted to Divizia C.

=== Oradea Region ===
Series I

Pos	Team	Pld	W	D	L	GF	GA	GD	Pts	Qualification or relegation
1	Flamura Roșie Oradea (Q)	16	12	2	2	47	13	+34	26	Qualification to championship final
2	Dinamo Oradea	16	8	4	4	27	14	+13	20	
3	Flamura Roșie Valea lui Mihai	16	9	2	5	36	22	+14	20	
4	Progresul Șimleu Silvaniei	16	6	4	6	20	23	−3	16	
5	Recolta Marghita	16	6	3	7	30	28	+2	15	
6	Energia Sărmășag	16	7	1	8	23	32	−9	15	
7	Metalul Energia Oradea	16	5	5	6	20	29	−9	15	
8	Recolta Săcuieni	16	4	5	7	23	23	0	13	
9	Energia Voivozi	16	1	2	13	13	55	−42	4	
10	Metalul Aleșd (Note: Metalul Aleșd was excluded in the first part of the season and all its results were canceled.) (D)	0	0	0	0	0	0	0	0	Excluded

Rules for classification: 1) points; 2) goal difference; 3) number of goals scored.
(D) Disqualified; (Q) Qualified for the phase indicated
Notes:

Series II

Pos	Team	Pld	W	D	L	GF	GA	GD	Pts	Qualification or relegation
1	Energia Minerul B (Q)	18	16	1	1	57	12	+45	33	Qualification to championship final
2	Flamura Roșie Salonta	18	14	2	2	51	16	+35	30	
3	Progresul Ineu	18	9	3	6	34	23	+11	21	
4	Recolta Sebiș	18	9	2	7	29	27	+2	20	
5	Dinamo Chișinău-Criș	18	8	1	9	25	20	+5	17	
6	Voința Oradea	18	7	3	8	26	26	0	17	
7	Flamura Roșie Gurahonț	18	7	2	9	27	44	−17	16	
8	Progresul Beiuș	18	6	3	9	23	33	−10	15	
9	Recolta Chișinău-Criș	18	5	0	13	18	40	−22	10	
10	Recolta Tinca	18	0	1	17	7	56	−49	1	

Rules for classification: 1) points; 2) goal difference; 3) number of goals scored.
(Q) Qualified for the phase indicated

Championship final

The matches were played on 21 and 28 October 1956.

Team 1	Agg.	Team 2	1st leg	2nd leg
Energia Minerul B	2–5	Flamura Roșie Oradea	1–1	1–4

Flamura Roșie Oradea won the Oradea Regional Championship and promoted to Divizia C.

=== Pitești Region ===
Pos	Team	Pld	W	D	L	GF	GA	GD	Pts	Qualification or relegation
1	Flacăra Leordeni (C, P)	26	19	5	2	72	14	+58	43	Promotion to Divizia C
2	Progresul Găești	26	18	2	6	78	31	+47	38	
3	Flamura Roșie Pitești	26	16	5	5	61	32	+29	37	
4	Victoria Râmnicu Vâlcea	26	14	5	7	61	31	+30	33	
5	Minerul Câmpulung	26	13	4	9	46	41	+5	30	
6	Metalul IMS Câmpulung	26	10	8	8	47	36	+11	28	
7	Flamura Roșie Curtea de Argeș	26	11	6	9	46	42	+4	28	
8	Progresul Slatina	26	10	5	11	46	50	−4	25	
9	Progresul Drăgășani	26	9	5	12	44	65	−21	23	
10	Recolta Drăgănești-Olt	26	7	8	11	46	58	−12	22	
11	Voința Pitești	26	7	4	15	31	68	−37	18	
12	Recolta Horezu	26	6	4	16	36	78	−42	16	
13	Locomotiva Pitești	26	5	5	16	42	65	−23	15	
14	Dinamo Pitești II	26	3	2	21	26	71	−45	8	

Rules for classification: 1) points; 2) goal difference; 3) number of goals scored.
(C) Champions; (P) Promoted

=== Ploiești Region ===
Pos	Team	Pld	W	D	L	GF	GA	GD	Pts	Qualification or relegation
1	Rafinăria 4 Câmpina (C, P)	25	17	6	2	61	25	+36	40	Promotion to Divizia C
2	Metalul 113 Plopeni	26	19	1	6	83	26	+57	39	
3	Energia GRT Moreni	25	17	3	5	68	28	+40	37	
4	Metalul 135 Mija	25	13	5	7	45	39	+6	31	
5	Energia Fieni	26	11	8	7	45	34	+11	30	
6	Energia Uzina Ploiești	25	10	9	6	46	33	+13	29	
7	Progresul Pucioasa	25	10	6	9	36	40	−4	26	
8	Energia Băicoi	25	7	8	10	28	43	−15	22	
9	Locomotiva Buzău	25	9	2	14	61	55	+6	20	
10	Energia Ochiuri	25	6	7	12	49	61	−12	19	
11	Energia Boldești	25	7	5	13	37	61	−24	19	
12	Energia OTAU Ploiești	25	6	6	13	35	48	−13	18	
13	Feroemail Ploiești	25	4	3	18	24	78	−54	11	
14	Energia Bușteni	25	5	1	19	17	64	−47	11	

Updated to match(es) played on unknown. Source:
Rules for classification: 1) points; 2) goal difference; 3) number of goals scored.
(C) Champions; (P) Promoted

== See also ==
- 1956 Divizia A
- 1956 Divizia B
- 1956 Divizia C
- 1956 Cupa României
