= 1958–59 Regional Championship =

17th season of the Liga IV, the fourth tier of the Romanian football league

Liga IV
- Season: 1958–59

The 1958–59 Regional Championship was the 17th season of the Regional Championship, the fourth tier of the Romanian football league system.

The promotion play-off did not take place this season as Divizia C was shutting down and no teams were promoted.

== Regional championships ==
- Baia Mare (BM)
- Bacău (BC)
- Bucharest Municipality (B)
- Bucharest Region (B)
- Cluj (CJ)
- Constanța (CT)
- Craiova (CR)
- Galați (GL)
- Hunedoara (HD)
- Iași (IS)
- Mureș (MS)
- Oradea (OR)
- Pitești (PI)
- Ploiești (PL)
- Stalin (ST)
- Suceava (SV)
- Timișoara (TM)

== Championships standings ==
=== Baia Mare Region ===
Pos	Team	Pld	W	D	L	GF	GA	GD	Pts	Qualification or relegation
1	Minerul Baia Sprie (C)	26	18	6	2	94	25	+69	42	Champions
2	CSM Baia Mare II	26	18	5	3	79	20	+59	41	
3	Voința Carei	26	12	5	9	57	47	+10	29	
4	Lăpușul Târgu Lăpuș	26	11	7	8	33	30	+3	29	
5	Stăruința Sighetu Marmației II	26	10	7	9	51	48	+3	27	
6	Voința Tășnad	26	11	3	12	56	47	+9	25	
7	Progresul Vișeu de Sus	26	10	5	11	35	42	−7	25	
8	Unirea Seini	26	9	6	11	25	33	−8	24	
9	Flamura Roșie Satu Mare	26	10	3	13	43	63	−20	23	
10	Progresul Cehu Silvaniei	26	10	2	14	37	63	−26	22	
11	Dinamo Săsar II	26	9	4	13	30	51	−21	22	
12	Dinamo Sighetu Marmației	26	9	3	14	55	57	−2	21	
13	Topitorul Ferneziu	26	8	4	14	38	57	−19	20	
14	Recolta Bixad	26	5	4	17	27	77	−50	14	

Rules for classification: 1) points; 2) goal difference; 3) number of goals scored.
(C) Champions

=== Bacău Region ===
Pos	Team	Pld	W	D	L	GF	GA	GD	Pts	Qualification or relegation
1	Steaua Roșie Bacău (C)	24	17	2	5	75	26	+49	36	Champions
2	Rapid Piatra Neamț	24	16	3	5	59	28	+31	35	
3	Hidroenergia Bicaz	24	15	3	6	57	20	+37	33	
4	Laminorul Roman	24	15	3	6	58	28	+30	33	
5	Hârtia Piatra Neamț	24	14	3	7	52	29	+23	31	
6	Bradul Roznov	24	11	1	12	47	49	−2	23	
7	Petrolul Onești	24	9	5	10	27	35	−8	23	
8	Cimentul Bicaz	24	10	2	12	43	40	+3	22	
9	Partizanul Bacău	24	6	7	11	30	49	−19	19	
10	Petrolulistul Dărmănești	24	6	4	14	35	70	−35	16	
11	Locomotiva Adjud (Note: Locomotiva Adjud started the season as Trotușul Adjud.)	24	7	1	16	31	69	−38	15	
12	Minerul Târgu Ocna (Note: Minerul Târgu Ocna started the season as Oituz Târgu Ocna.)	24	6	2	16	20	60	−40	14	
13	Minerul Comănești	24	3	6	15	19	50	−31	12	
14	Victoria Bacău (Note: Victoria Bacău was excluded in the first part of the season and all its results were canceled.) (D)	0	0	0	0	0	0	0	0	Excluded

Rules for classification: 1) points; 2) goal difference; 3) number of goals scored.
(C) Champions; (D) Disqualified

=== Bucharest Municipality ===
Pos	Team	Pld	W	D	L	GF	GA	GD	Pts	Qualification or relegation
1	Bumbacul București (C)	21	11	7	3	40	18	+22	29	Champions
2	Armata București	21	10	6	5	43	28	+15	26	
3	Timpuri Noi București	22	9	8	5	40	29	+11	26	
4	Bere Rahova	21	8	5	8	28	28	0	21	
5	Icar București	22	6	9	7	28	31	−3	21	
6	IOR București	22	5	10	7	25	27	−2	20	
7	Vestitorul București	22	7	6	9	30	35	−5	20	
8	Abatorul București	22	5	10	7	17	20	−3	20	
9	Aeronautica București	22	9	2	11	33	39	−6	20	
10	Laminorul București	22	7	6	9	32	38	−6	20	
11	Quadrat București	21	8	4	9	32	41	−9	20	
12	Filaret București	22	6	5	11	25	39	−14	17	

Rules for classification: 1) points; 2) goal difference; 3) number of goals scored.
(C) Champions

=== Bucharest Region ===
Pos	Team	Pld	W	D	L	GF	GA	GD	Pts	Qualification or relegation
1	CFR Roșiori (C)	24	16	3	5	68	15	+53	35	Champions
2	Olimpia Giurgiu	24	14	5	5	52	25	+27	33	
3	SN Oltenița	24	14	5	5	53	34	+19	33	
4	Dunărea Giurgiu	24	9	11	4	37	21	+16	29	
5	Unirea Buftea	24	13	3	8	40	40	0	29	
6	Sporting Roșiori	24	12	4	8	61	30	+31	28	
7	Unirea Mânăstirea	24	10	6	8	47	30	+17	26	
8	CSM Giurgiu	24	9	5	10	49	43	+6	23	
9	Unirea Călărași (Note: Voința Călărași and Olimpia Călărași merge on 31 October 1958 to form Unirea Călărași.)	23	8	3	12	21	38	−17	19	
10	Ialomița Nouă Slobozia	23	7	3	13	24	58	−34	17	
11	Progresul Alexandria	24	7	2	15	32	48	−16	16	
12	Unirea Videle	24	5	3	16	19	35	−16	13	
13	Partizanul Ciulnița	24	3	3	18	21	73	−52	9	
14	Olimpia Călărași (D)	0	0	0	0	0	0	0	0	Disbanded

Rules for classification: 1) points; 2) goal difference; 3) number of goals scored.
(C) Champions; (D) Disqualified

=== Constanța Region ===
Pos	Team	Pld	W	D	L	GF	GA	GD	Pts	Qualification or relegation
1	Marina Constanța (C)	20	18	1	1	88	7	+81	37	Champions
2	Dinamo Constanța	20	15	0	5	42	23	+19	30	
3	Fetești	20	8	6	6	32	22	+10	22	
4	Electrica CFR Constanța	20	9	4	7	28	31	−3	22	
5	Ideal Cernavodă	20	9	2	9	35	36	−1	20	
6	Steaua Mangalia	20	7	3	10	36	40	−4	17	
7	Locomotiva Fetești	20	7	3	10	23	32	−9	17	
8	Flamura Roșie Tulcea	20	8	1	11	28	40	−12	17	
9	Spartac Constanța	20	6	3	11	26	44	−18	15	
10	Petrolul Constanța	20	4	6	10	29	55	−26	14	
11	Locomotiva Medgidia	20	1	3	16	17	57	−40	5	

Rules for classification: 1) points; 2) goal difference; 3) number of goals scored.
(C) Champions

=== Craiova Region ===
Pos	Team	Pld	W	D	L	GF	GA	GD	Pts	Qualification or relegation
1	CSA Craiova (C)	25	18	6	1	73	14	+59	42	Champions
2	Progresul Băilești	25	16	1	8	60	40	+20	33	
3	Electroputere Craiova	26	14	4	8	61	28	+33	32	
4	Dunărea Calafat	26	15	1	10	54	36	+18	31	
5	Metalurgistul Sadu	25	12	6	7	41	23	+18	30	
6	Progresul Caracal	26	12	6	8	56	46	+10	30	
7	Metalul 7 Noiembrie Craiova	26	11	6	9	41	31	+10	28	
8	Progresul Balș	26	11	5	10	44	49	−5	27	
9	Dinamo Turnu Severin	26	11	4	11	49	44	+5	26	
10	Progresul Strehaia	26	8	6	12	26	49	−23	22	
11	Confecția Târgu Jiu	26	8	5	13	26	40	−14	21	
12	Progresul Segarcea	25	6	4	15	34	72	−38	16	
13	Jiul Craiova II	26	5	1	20	31	77	−46	11	
14	Drobeta Turnu Severin II	26	5	1	20	17	64	−47	11	

Rules for classification: 1) points; 2) goal difference; 3) number of goals scored.
(C) Champions

=== Galați Region ===
Pos	Team	Pld	W	D	L	GF	GA	GD	Pts	Qualification or relegation
1	Marina Brăila (C)	26	20	4	2	70	16	+54	44	Champions
2	Progresul Brăila	26	21	1	4	83	14	+69	43	
3	Celuloza IMD Brăila	26	18	3	5	68	31	+37	39	
4	Grivița Roșie Făurei	26	16	4	6	58	42	+16	36	
5	Metalosport Galați	26	15	3	8	51	29	+22	33	
6	Voința Focșani	26	10	6	10	46	44	+2	26	
7	Dunărea Brăila	26	12	1	13	43	43	0	25	
8	Recolta Ianca	26	10	3	13	43	59	−16	23	
9	Recolta Însurăței	26	7	6	13	22	59	−37	20	
10	Chimica Mărășești	26	6	7	13	26	42	−16	19	
11	Flamura Roșie Tecuci	26	6	5	15	34	61	−27	17	
12	Muncitorul Ghidigeni	26	6	4	16	32	56	−24	16	
13	Dinamo Galați II	26	5	4	17	38	66	−28	14	
14	Voința Galați	26	3	3	20	18	73	−55	9	

Rules for classification: 1) points; 2) goal difference; 3) number of goals scored.
(C) Champions

=== Hunedoara Region ===
Pos	Team	Pld	W	D	L	GF	GA	GD	Pts	Qualification or relegation
1	Minerul Aninoasa (C)	26	20	2	4	65	23	+42	42	Champions
2	Dacia Orăștie	26	16	5	5	59	28	+31	37	
3	Corvinul Hunedoara II	26	16	3	7	50	35	+15	35	
4	Parângul Lonea	26	15	1	10	49	35	+14	31	
5	Corvinul Deva	26	12	7	7	39	30	+9	31	
6	Unirea Alba Iulia	26	13	4	9	55	42	+13	30	
7	Minerul Vulcan	26	12	5	9	46	42	+4	29	
8	Corvinul Hunedoara III	26	9	5	12	42	38	+4	23	
9	Șurianul Sebeș	26	9	4	13	50	53	−3	22	
10	Metalul Cugir	26	10	2	14	39	52	−13	22	
11	Victoria Călan	26	8	5	13	38	51	−13	21	
12	Dinamo Orăștie	26	8	4	14	45	57	−12	20	
13	Aurul Zlatna	26	7	5	14	37	47	−10	19	
14	Victoria Hațeg	26	0	2	24	14	98	−84	2	

Rules for classification: 1) points; 2) goal difference; 3) number of goals scored.
(C) Champions

=== Iași Region ===
Pos	Team	Pld	W	D	L	GF	GA	GD	Pts	Qualification or relegation
1	Progresul Vaslui (C)	22	16	3	3	62	18	+44	35	Champions
2	Gloria Pașcani	22	17	1	4	52	17	+35	35	
3	Dinamo Iași	22	15	3	4	75	25	+50	33	
4	Penicilina Iași	22	15	1	6	57	23	+34	31	
5	Țesătura Iași	21	15	0	6	53	16	+37	30	
6	Victoria Vaslui	22	11	5	6	42	29	+13	27	
7	Victoria Huși	22	7	1	14	29	70	−41	15	
8	Flacăra Murgeni	22	5	3	14	31	60	−29	13	
9	Progresul Hârlău	21	5	2	14	20	48	−28	12	
10	Rulmentul Bârlad	22	5	1	16	29	55	−26	11	
11	Unirea Negrești	22	4	1	17	30	72	−42	9	
12	Progresul Huși	22	4	1	17	20	67	−47	9	

Rules for classification: 1) points; 2) goal difference; 3) number of goals scored.
(C) Champions

=== Oradea Region ===
Pos	Team	Pld	W	D	L	GF	GA	GD	Pts	Qualification or relegation
1	Granit Dr.Petru Groza (C)	26	19	5	2	68	18	+50	43	Champions
2	Stăruința Salonta	26	17	6	3	53	17	+36	40	
3	Recolta Săcuieni	26	17	5	4	72	49	+23	39	
4	Crișana Sebiș	26	13	5	8	44	43	+1	31	
5	Dinamo Oradea	26	12	3	11	48	38	+10	27	
6	Spartac Valea lui Mihai	26	10	7	9	39	37	+2	27	
7	Crișul Ineu	26	9	7	10	42	41	+1	25	
8	Electrica Oradea	26	10	1	15	63	52	+11	21	
9	Victoria Chișineu-Criș	26	8	4	14	33	51	−18	20	
10	Măgura Șimleu Silvaniei	26	8	4	14	36	63	−27	20	
11	Victoria Marghita	26	6	7	13	39	59	−20	19	
12	Bihorul Beiuș	26	6	7	13	28	46	−18	19	
13	Biharia Vașcău	26	8	2	16	31	60	−29	18	
14	Minerul Sărmășag	26	4	3	19	35	77	−42	11	

Rules for classification: 1) points; 2) goal difference; 3) number of goals scored.
(C) Champions

=== Pitești Region ===
Pos	Team	Pld	W	D	L	GF	GA	GD	Pts	Qualification or relegation
1	Dinamo Pitești (C)	25	20	3	2	87	21	+66	43	Champions
2	Progresul Curtea de Argeș	25	11	9	5	57	37	+20	31 (Note: Spartac Curtea de Argeș was renamed Progresul Curtea de Argeș during the second half of the season.)	
3	Muscelul IMS Câmpulung	25	11	8	6	51	35	+16	30	
4	Oltul Râmnicu Vâlcea	25	12	3	10	41	40	+1	27	
5	Rapid Piatra-Olt	25	11	5	9	33	40	−7	27	
6	Unirea Drăgășani	25	11	3	11	38	36	+2	25	
7	Petrolul Vedea	25	10	4	11	49	48	+1	24	
8	Progresul Găești	25	9	6	10	44	37	+7	24 (Note: Petrolul Găești was renamed Progresul Găești during the second half of the season.)	
9	Victoria Slatina	25	9	3	13	44	45	−1	21	
10	CSA Râmnicu Vâlcea	25	6	7	12	28	45	−17	19	
11	Oltul Drăgănești-Olt	25	8	1	16	46	56	−10	17	
12	Lotru Brezoi	25	5	7	13	43	61	−18	17	
13	CSA Câmpulung	25	6	2	17	27	76	−49	14 (Note: CSA Câmpulung withdrew during the second half of the season.)	
14	Șoimii Colibași (D)	13	2	5	6	17	28	−11	9 (Note: Șoimii Colibași merged with Unirea Pitești from Divizia C during the winter break to form Metalul Pitești.)	Disbanded

Rules for classification: 1) points; 2) goal difference; 3) number of goals scored.
(C) Champions; (D) Disqualified

=== Ploiești Region ===
Pos	Team	Pld	W	D	L	GF	GA	GD	Pts	Qualification or relegation
1	Olimpia Pucioasa (C)	28	18	4	6	60	21	+39	40	Champions
2	Unirea Azuga	28	17	4	7	60	38	+22	38	
3	Zefir Brănești	28	15	6	7	46	37	+9	36	
4	CFR Buzău	28	14	7	7	56	31	+25	35	
5	Cimentul Fieni	28	13	9	6	48	28	+20	35	
6	Unirea Ploiești	28	13	4	11	52	44	+8	30	
7	Muncitorul Schela Mare	28	11	7	10	60	44	+16	29	
8	Dinamo Câmpina	28	10	7	11	46	41	+5	27	
9	Metalul Mija	28	9	9	10	50	58	−8	27	
10	Petrolul Băicoi	28	10	4	14	47	59	−12	24	
11	Tricolor Ploiești	28	7	10	11	32	53	−21	24	
12	Rapid Mizil	28	8	6	14	48	60	−12	22	
13	Victoria Moreni	28	8	5	15	29	42	−13	21	
14	Petrolul Ochiuri	28	6	5	17	38	67	−29	17	
15	Petrolul Teleajen Ploiești	28	5	5	18	28	77	−49	15	

Rules for classification: 1) points; 2) goal difference; 3) number of goals scored.
(C) Champions

=== Suceava Region ===
Pos	Team	Pld	W	D	L	GF	GA	GD	Pts	Qualification or relegation
1	Minerul Vatra Dornei (C)	24	20	2	2	113	11	+102	42	Champions
2	Dinamo Botoșani	24	19	2	3	106	22	+84	40	
3	Constructorul Vatra Dornei	24	17	3	4	77	40	+37	37	
4	Avântul Frasin	24	14	3	7	66	49	+17	31	
5	Steagul Roșu CFR Suceava	24	11	6	7	50	41	+9	28	
6	Energia Moldovița	24	11	4	9	52	51	+1	26	
7	Filatura Fălticeni	24	10	3	11	44	46	−2	23	
8	Metalul Rădăuți	24	9	3	12	57	74	−17	21	
9	Fulgerul Suceava	24	8	3	13	46	83	−37	19	
10	IRA 10 Siret	24	4	6	14	28	72	−44	14	
11	Voința Botoșani	24	4	4	16	23	72	−49	12	
12	Unirea Gura Humorului	24	4	2	18	25	83	−58	10	
13	Feroviarul Câmpulung Moldovenesc	24	3	3	18	15	58	−43	9	
14	Bradul Vama	0	0	0	0	0	0	0	0 (Note: Bradul Vama was excluded in the first part of the season and all its results were canceled.)	Excluded

Rules for classification: 1) points; 2) goal difference; 3) number of goals scored.
(C) Champions

== See also ==
- 1958–59 Divizia A
- 1958–59 Divizia B
- 1958–59 Divizia C
- 1958–59 Cupa României
