= Stadionul Șoimii =

Sports stadium in Romania

- Interactive map of Stadionul Șoimii
- Address: Str. Luncii, nr. 9
- Location: Pâncota, Romania
- Coordinates: 46°19′51.8″N 21°41′1.1″E
- Owner: Pâncota City Hall
- Operator: Podgoria Pâncota
- Capacity: 2,000 seated
- Surface: Grass

Construction
- Opened: 1930
- Renovated: 2013, 2014

Tenants
- Șoimii Pâncota (1938–2016); Podgoria Pâncota (2016–present); Șoimii Lipova (2017–2020)

Stadionul Șoimii is a multi-use stadium in Pâncota, Romania. It is used mostly for football matches and is the home ground of Podgoria Pâncota. It was the home ground of Șoimii Pâncota between 1938 and 2016. The stadium holds 2,000 people.
