= 1979–80 Divizia B =

Divizia B
- Season: 1979–80
- Promoted: FCM Brașov; Progresul Vulcan București; Corvinul Hunedoara
- Relegated: Muscelul Câmpulung; Energia Slatina; Unirea Alba Iulia; ICIM Brașov; Carpați Mârșa; IS Câmpia Turzii; Energia Gheorghiu-Dej; Chimia Turnu Magurele; Someșul Satu Mare; Portul Constanța; FCM Giurgiu; Strungul Arad

The 1979–80 Divizia B was the 40th season of the second tier of the Romanian football league system.

The format has been maintained to three series, each of them having 18 teams. At the end of the season the winners of the series promoted to Divizia A and the last four places from each series relegated to Divizia C.

== Team changes ==
=== To Divizia B ===
Promoted from Divizia C

- CS Botoșani
- Energia Gheorghiu-Dej
- Unirea Focșani
- Cimentul Medgidia
- Mecanică Fină București
- Flacăra-Automecanica Moreni
- Pandurii Târgu Jiu
- Unirea Alba Iulia
- Strungul Arad
- Someșul Satu Mare
- Carpați Mârșa
- Viitorul Gheorgheni

Relegated from Divizia A

- Corvinul Hunedoara
- UTA Arad
- Bihor Oradea

=== From Divizia B ===
Relegated to Divizia C

- Relon Ceahlăul Piatra Neamț
- Drobeta Turnu-Severin
- Mureșul Deva
- Oltul Sfântu Gheorghe
- Electroputere Craiova
- CIL Sighetu Marmației
- Victoria Tecuci
- SN Oltenița
- Victoria Călan
- Constructorul Iași
- Chimia Brazi
- CFR Timișoara

Promoted to Divizia A

- FCM Galați
- Viitorul Scornicești
- Universitatea Cluj

=== Renamed teams ===
Dinamo Slatina was renamed as Energia Slatina.

Steagul Roșu Brașov was renamed as FCM Brașov.

== League tables ==
=== Serie I ===
Pos	Team	Pld	W	D	L	GF	GA	GD	Pts	Promotion or relegation
1	FCM Brașov (C, P)	34	22	7	5	65	18	+47	51	Promotion to Divizia A
2	FC Constanța	34	19	3	12	66	39	+27	41	
3	CS Botoșani	34	18	2	14	48	41	+7	38	
4	Unirea Focșani	34	16	4	14	55	39	+16	36	
5	Delta Tulcea	34	15	6	13	46	42	+4	36	
6	Viitorul Vaslui	34	15	5	14	51	46	+5	35	
7	CSM Suceava	34	14	6	14	40	42	−2	34	
8	FC Brăila	34	14	6	14	46	50	−4	34	
9	Cimentul Medgidia	34	16	2	16	53	60	−7	34	
10	Nitramonia Făgăraș	34	16	2	16	38	47	−9	34	
11	Minerul Gura Humorului	34	14	6	14	30	52	−22	34	
12	Viitorul Gheorgheni	34	13	7	14	48	49	−1	33	
13	Tractorul Brașov	34	12	8	14	45	42	+3	32	
14	Progresul Brăila	34	14	4	16	48	47	+1	32	
15	Muscelul Câmpulung (R)	34	12	8	14	49	53	−4	32	Relegation to Divizia C
16	ICIM Brașov (R)	34	11	8	15	48	47	+1	30	Relegation to Divizia C
17	Energia Gheorghiu-Dej (R)	34	11	5	18	39	58	−19	27	Relegation to Divizia C
18	Portul Constanța (R)	34	6	7	21	23	66	−43	19	Relegation to Divizia C

Source: romaniansoccer.ro (in Romanian)
Rules for classification: 1) Points; 2) Goal difference; 3) Goals scored; 4) Head-to-head points; 5) Head-to-head goal difference; 6) Head-to-head goals scored; 7) Head-to-head away goals scored.
(C) Champions; (P) Promoted; (R) Relegated

=== Serie II ===
Pos	Team	Pld	W	D	L	GF	GA	GD	Pts	Promotion or relegation
1	Progresul Vulcan București (C, P)	34	18	8	8	63	38	+25	44	Promotion to Divizia A
2	Rapid București	34	19	4	11	61	37	+24	42	
3	Petrolul Ploiești	34	17	5	12	51	37	+14	39	
4	Metalul Plopeni	34	16	6	12	46	32	+14	38	
5	Rulmentul Alexandria	34	15	7	12	46	33	+13	37	
6	Poiana Câmpina	34	18	0	16	47	50	−3	36	
7	Metalul București	34	15	5	14	44	37	+7	35	
8	Șoimii Sibiu	34	16	3	15	42	47	−5	35	
9	Autobuzul București	34	13	8	13	64	48	+16	34	
10	Chimica Târnăveni	34	15	4	15	55	47	+8	34	
11	Gaz Metan Mediaș	34	15	4	15	53	51	+2	34	
12	Flacăra-Automecanica Moreni	34	15	4	15	48	55	−7	34	
13	Pandurii Târgu Jiu	34	15	4	15	48	59	−11	34	
14	Mecanică Fină București	34	12	9	13	47	43	+4	33	
15	Energia Slatina (R)	34	15	3	16	47	52	−5	33	Relegation to Divizia C
16	Carpați Mârșa (R)	34	12	2	20	35	74	−39	26	Relegation to Divizia C
17	Chimia Turnu Măgurele (R)	34	9	7	18	39	60	−21	25	Relegation to Divizia C
18	FCM Giurgiu (R)	34	6	7	21	25	61	−36	19	Relegation to Divizia C

Source: romaniansoccer.ro (in Romanian)
Rules for classification: 1) Points; 2) Goal difference; 3) Goals scored; 4) Head-to-head points; 5) Head-to-head goal difference; 6) Head-to-head goals scored; 7) Head-to-head away goals scored.
(C) Champions; (P) Promoted; (R) Relegated

=== Serie III ===
Pos	Team	Pld	W	D	L	GF	GA	GD	Pts	Promotion or relegation
1	Corvinul Hunedoara (C, P)	34	23	3	8	90	42	+48	49	Promotion to Divizia A
2	Bihor Oradea	34	19	5	10	76	47	+29	43	
3	UTA Arad	34	18	4	12	59	40	+19	40	
4	Gloria Bistrița	34	17	3	14	75	52	+23	37	
5	Aurul Brad	34	15	5	14	66	50	+16	35	
6	Minerul Cavnic	34	15	5	14	54	56	−2	35	
7	FCM Reșița	34	15	4	15	61	46	+15	34	
8	Metalurgistul Cugir	34	15	4	15	51	57	−6	34	
9	Minerul Anina	34	16	1	17	51	63	−12	33	
10	CFR Cluj	34	14	4	16	47	54	−7	32	
11	UM Timișoara	34	15	2	17	40	50	−10	32	
12	Minerul Moldova Nouă	34	15	2	17	40	61	−21	32	
13	Înfrățirea Oradea	34	15	1	18	45	43	+2	31	
14	Dacia Orăștie	34	14	3	17	39	56	−17	31	
15	Unirea Alba Iulia (R)	34	13	5	16	38	67	−29	31	Relegation to Divizia C
16	IS Câmpia Turzii (R)	34	13	3	18	50	59	−9	29	Relegation to Divizia C
17	Someșul Satu Mare (R)	34	13	3	18	43	60	−17	29	Relegation to Divizia C
18	Strungul Arad (R)	34	12	1	21	44	66	−22	25	Relegation to Divizia C

Source: romaniansoccer.ro (in Romanian)
Rules for classification: 1) Points; 2) Goal difference; 3) Goals scored; 4) Head-to-head points; 5) Head-to-head goal difference; 6) Head-to-head goals scored; 7) Head-to-head away goals scored.
(C) Champions; (P) Promoted; (R) Relegated

== See also ==
- 1979–80 Divizia A
- 1979–80 Divizia C
- 1979–80 County Championship
