= 1980–81 Divizia C =

Third tier Romanian football league

Divizia C
- Season: 1980–81

The 1980–81 Divizia C was the 25th season of Liga III, the third tier of the Romanian football league system.

== Team changes ==
=== To Divizia C ===
Relegated from Divizia B

- Muscelul Câmpulung
- Energia Slatina
- Unirea Alba Iulia
- ICIM Brașov
- Carpați Mârșa
- Industria Sârmei Câmpia Turzii
- Energia Gheorghiu-Dej
- Chimia Turnu Magurele
- Someșul Satu Mare
- Portul Constanța
- FCM Giurgiu
- Strungul Arad

Promoted from County Championship

- Unirea Siret
- Tepro Iași
- Victoria IRA Bacău
- FEPA 74 Bârlad
- Avântul Matca
- Tractorul Viziru
- Constructorul Călărași
- Viitorul Mahmudia
- Cetatea Turnu Măgurele
- ICIM Ploiești
- Unirea Răcari
- Mecanizatorul Șimian
- Victoria Craiova
- Șoimii Lipova
- CFR Caransebeș
- Unirea Valea lui Mihai
- Rapid Jibou
- Electrozahăr Târgu Mureș
- Minerul Paroșeni
- Textila Năsăud
- Minerul Baia Borșa
- Metalul Mangalia
- Hidroenergia Râmnicu Vâlcea
- Constructorul Sfântu Gheorghe

=== From Divizia C ===
Promoted to Divizia B

- Ceahlăul Piatra Neamț
- Borzești
- CSU Galați
- IMU Medgidia
- Sirena București
- ROVA Roșiori
- Minerul Lupeni
- CFR Timișoara
- Rapid Arad
- CIL Sighetu Marmației
- Metalul Aiud
- Oltul Sfântu Gheorghe

Relegated to County Championship

- IM Piatra-Neamț
- Danubiana Roman
- Constructorul Vaslui
- ASA Iași
- Chimia Buzău
- FNC Săhăteni
- ~~Dacia Unirea Brăila~~
- Granitul Babadag
- Automecanica București
- Vâscoza București
- Dinamo Alexandria
- Constructorul Pitești
- Chimistul Râmnicu Vâlcea
- Gloria Strehaia
- Laminorul Nădrag
- Știința Petroșani
- Minerul Șuncuiuș
- Unirea Oradea
- Bradul Vișeu de Sus
- Hebe Sângeorz-Băi
- Sticla Târnaveni
- Faianța Sighișoara
- Carpați Covasna
- Utilajul Făgăraș

=== Renamed teams ===
Dinamo CPL Focșani was renamed Gloria Focșani.

Pescărușul Tulcea was renamed Șantierul Naval Tulcea.

Unirea Știința Eforie Nord was renamed Unirea Eforie Nord.

Metalul Rovinari was renamed Jiul Rovinari.

Hidroenergia Râmnicu Vâlcea was renamed Minerul Râmnicu Vâlcea.

Șoimii Lipova was renamed Șoimii Strungul Lipova.

=== Other changes ===
Chimia Brăila took the place of Progresul Brăila in Divizia B due to the merger between FC Brăila and Progresul Brăila

Dacia Unirea Brăila was spared from relegation.

Explorări Deva and Minerul Deva merged, the first one being absorbed by the second one and was renamed Explormin Deva.

Minerul Certej took the place of Explorări Deva in Divizia C due to the merger between Explorări and Minerul Deva.

Știința Petroșani and Minerul Vulcan merged, the first one being absorbed by the second one and was renamed Minerul Știința Vulcan.

IPA Sibiu was renamed during the winter break as Textila IPA Sibiu and moved to Cisnădie.

== League tables ==
=== Seria I ===
Pos	Team	Pld	W	D	L	GF	GA	GD	Pts	Promotion or relegation
1	Constructorul Iași (C, P)	30	19	5	6	76	30	+46	43	Promotion to Divizia B
2	Foresta Fălticeni	30	17	8	5	51	12	+39	42	
3	Laminorul Roman	30	16	6	8	49	32	+17	38	
4	Avântul TCMM Frasin	30	13	6	11	44	44	0	32	
5	CFR Pașcani	30	14	4	12	34	45	−11	32	
6	Nicolina Iași	30	12	6	12	37	44	−7	30	
7	Tepro Iași	30	12	5	13	36	37	−1	29	
8	Dorna Vatra Dornei	30	11	6	13	40	33	+7	28	
9	Metalul Rădăuți	30	10	8	12	46	40	+6	28	
10	ASA Câmpulung Moldovenesc	30	12	4	14	40	37	+3	28	
11	Cetatea Târgu Neamț	30	13	2	15	42	51	−9	28	
12	Cristalul Dorohoi	30	12	3	15	30	45	−15	27	
13	Siretul Bucecea	30	11	4	15	39	51	−12	26	
14	Metalul Botoșani	30	12	2	16	41	50	−9	26	
15	Zimbrul Suceava (R)	30	8	7	15	31	51	−20	23	Relegation to County Championship
16	Unirea Siret (R)	30	9	2	19	30	64	−34	20	Relegation to County Championship

Source: romaniansoccer.ro
Rules for classification: 1) points; 2) goal difference; 3) number of goals scored.
(C) Champions; (P) Promoted; (R) Relegated

=== Seria II ===
Pos	Team	Pld	W	D	L	GF	GA	GD	Pts	Promotion or relegation
1	Relonul Săvinești (C, P)	28	14	10	4	46	19	+27	38	Promotion to Divizia B
2	Minerul Comănești	28	15	3	10	47	26	+21	33	
3	Letea Bacău	28	12	6	10	50	35	+15	30	
4	Partizanul Bacău	28	12	5	11	51	34	+17	29	
5	Gloria Focșani	28	12	5	11	42	51	−9	29	
6	Victoria IRA Bacău	28	13	2	13	39	38	+1	28	
7	Textila Buhuși	28	12	4	12	46	48	−2	28	
8	Rulmentul Bârlad	28	11	5	12	30	33	−3	27	
9	Celuloza Piatra Neamț	28	12	3	13	35	51	−16	27	
10	Cimentul Bicaz	28	10	6	12	40	42	−2	26	
11	Demar Mărășești	28	11	4	13	37	43	−6	26	
12	Energia Gheorghiu-Dej	28	11	4	13	33	45	−12	26	
13	Petrolul Moinești	28	11	3	14	48	40	+8	25	
14	Luceafărul Adjud	28	11	2	15	41	59	−18	24	
15	FEPA 74 Bârlad (R)	28	11	2	15	31	52	−21	24	Relegation to County Championship
16	Hușana Huși (D)	0	0	0	0	0	0	0	0 (Note: Hușana Huși withdrew after 14 rounds and all its results were canceled.)	Withdrew

Source: romaniansoccer.ro
Rules for classification: 1) points; 2) goal difference; 3) number of goals scored.
(C) Champions; (D) Disqualified; (P) Promoted; (R) Relegated

=== Seria III ===
Pos	Team	Pld	W	D	L	GF	GA	GD	Pts	Promotion or relegation
1	Oțelul Galați (C, P)	30	21	6	3	63	16	+47	48	Promotion to Divizia B
2	Chimia Brazi	30	20	4	6	74	22	+52	44	
3	Victoria Tecuci	30	17	3	10	48	26	+22	37	
4	Carpați Sinaia	30	17	2	11	61	38	+23	36	
5	Carpați Nehoiu	30	15	3	12	49	46	+3	33	
6	Petrolul Băicoi	30	16	0	14	70	41	+29	32	
7	Petrolul Berca	30	13	5	12	52	41	+11	31	
8	Ancora Galați	30	14	2	14	48	38	+10	30	
9	Olimpia Râmnicu Sărat	30	12	4	14	32	45	−13	28	
10	Șantierul Naval Brăila	30	11	5	14	50	54	−4	27	
11	Avântul Matca	30	11	5	14	44	64	−20	27	
12	Caraimanul Bușteni	30	11	4	15	47	45	+2	26	
13	Ferom Urziceni	30	11	4	15	47	51	−4	26	
14	Foresta Gugești	30	11	4	15	48	61	−13	26	
15	Dacia Unirea Brăila (R)	30	12	3	15	36	47	−11	23 (Note: Dacia Unirea Brăila deducted 4 points.)	Relegation to County Championship
16	Tractorul Viziru (R)	30	1	0	29	14	148	−134	2	Relegation to County Championship

Source: romaniansoccer.ro
Rules for classification: 1) points; 2) goal difference; 3) number of goals scored.
(C) Champions; (P) Promoted; (R) Relegated

=== Seria IV ===
Pos	Team	Pld	W	D	L	GF	GA	GD	Pts	Promotion or relegation
1	Dunărea Călărași (C, P)	30	20	6	4	77	21	+56	46	Promotion to Divizia B
2	Portul Constanța	30	18	2	10	66	40	+26	38	
3	Constructorul Călărași	30	16	2	12	52	40	+12	34	
4	Metalul Mangalia	30	13	7	10	38	35	+3	33	
5	Rapid Fetești	30	14	3	13	46	39	+7	31	
6	Chimpex Constanța	30	11	9	10	37	34	+3	31	
7	Progresul Isaccea	30	13	4	13	45	44	+1	30	
8	Șantierul Naval Tulcea	30	12	4	14	57	36	+21	28	
9	Amonil Slobozia	30	14	4	12	46	34	+12	28 (Note: Amonil Slobozia deducted 4 points.)	
10	Marina Mangalia	30	11	6	13	43	45	−2	28	
11	Viitorul Mahmudia	30	12	4	14	39	87	−48	28	
12	Voința Constanța	30	11	5	14	36	49	−13	27	
13	Victoria Țăndărei	30	11	4	15	43	52	−9	26	
14	Șoimii Cernavodă	30	10	6	14	31	51	−20	26	
15	Electrica Constanța (R)	30	8	7	15	29	48	−19	23	Relegation to County Championship
16	Unirea Eforie Nord (R)	30	7	5	18	29	59	−30	19 (Note: Unirea Eforie Nord didn't present in rounds 26 and 27 and was excluded from championship.)	Relegation to County Championship

Source: romaniansoccer.ro
Rules for classification: 1) points; 2) goal difference; 3) number of goals scored.
(C) Champions; (P) Promoted; (R) Relegated

=== Seria V ===
Pos	Team	Pld	W	D	L	GF	GA	GD	Pts	Promotion or relegation
1	Automatica București (C, P)	30	19	5	6	62	22	+40	43	Promotion to Divizia B
2	TMB București	30	15	5	10	39	32	+7	35	
3	Chimia Turnu Măgurele	30	13	6	11	39	41	−2	32	
4	Abatorul București	30	12	6	12	36	36	0	30	
5	Petrolul Videle	30	11	8	11	31	37	−6	30	
6	Viitorul Chirnogi	30	12	6	12	30	37	−7	30	
7	Șantierul Naval Oltenița	30	10	9	11	34	30	+4	29	
8	Danubiana București	30	10	9	11	33	33	0	29	
9	Cetatea Turnu Măgurele	30	14	1	15	35	60	−25	29	
10	FCM Giurgiu	30	11	6	13	45	36	+9	28	
11	ICSIM București	30	12	4	14	34	32	+2	28	
12	Flacăra Roșie București	30	9	10	11	31	33	−2	28	
13	Tehnometal București	30	10	8	12	36	47	−11	28	
14	Electronica Obor București	30	11	6	13	30	43	−13	28	
15	Voința București (R)	30	11	5	14	50	40	+10	27	Relegation to County Championship
16	Petrolul Bolintin-Vale (R)	30	9	8	13	36	42	−6	26	Relegation to County Championship

Source: romaniansoccer.ro
Rules for classification: 1) points; 2) goal difference; 3) number of goals scored.
(C) Champions; (P) Promoted; (R) Relegated

=== Seria VI ===
Pos	Team	Pld	W	D	L	GF	GA	GD	Pts	Promotion or relegation
1	Energia Slatina (C, P)	30	23	1	6	80	23	+57	47	Promotion to Divizia B
2	Prahova Ploiești	30	19	4	7	59	28	+31	42	
3	ICIM Ploiești	30	17	4	9	61	31	+30	38	
4	Metalul Mija	30	15	4	11	45	39	+6	34	
5	Sportul Muncitoresc Caracal	30	13	6	11	68	45	+23	32	
6	Electronistul Curtea de Argeș	30	14	3	13	46	49	−3	31	
7	Cimentul Fieni	30	12	6	12	45	41	+4	30	
8	Muscelul Câmpulung	30	12	5	13	42	31	+11	29	
9	Dacia Pitești	30	12	4	14	49	32	+17	28	
10	Progresul Corabia	30	12	3	15	41	43	−2	27	
11	IOB Balș	30	12	2	16	34	62	−28	26	
12	Recolta Stoicănești	30	12	1	17	40	51	−11	25	
13	Progresul Pucioasa	30	11	3	16	26	42	−16	25	
14	Unirea Răcari	30	12	1	17	44	87	−43	25	
15	Petrolul Târgoviște (R)	30	9	5	16	32	71	−39	23	Relegation to County Championship
16	IPC Slatina (R)	30	8	2	20	20	57	−37	18	Relegation to County Championship

Source: romaniansoccer.ro
Rules for classification: 1) points; 2) goal difference; 3) number of goals scored.
(C) Champions; (P) Promoted; (R) Relegated

=== Seria VII ===
Pos	Team	Pld	W	D	L	GF	GA	GD	Pts	Promotion or relegation
1	Drobeta-Turnu Severin (C, P)	30	23	1	6	66	20	+46	43 (Note: Drobeta-Turnu Severin deducted 4 points.)	Promotion to Divizia B
2	Electroputere Craiova	30	18	7	5	55	25	+30	43	
3	CFR Craiova	30	16	7	7	41	18	+23	39	
4	Dunărea Calafat	30	14	4	12	44	32	+12	32	
5	Minerul Motru	30	13	5	12	50	39	+11	31	
6	Dierna Orșova	30	14	3	13	50	40	+10	31	
7	Jiul Rovinari	30	12	7	11	32	45	−13	31	
8	Constructorul TCI Craiova	30	13	2	15	45	40	+5	28	
9	Viitorul Drăgășani	30	13	2	15	42	46	−4	28	
10	Lotru Brezoi	30	11	5	14	48	47	+1	27	
11	Metalurgistul Sadu	30	12	3	15	31	36	−5	27	
12	Unirea Drobeta-Turnu Severin	30	11	5	14	34	42	−8	27	
13	Mecanizatorul Șimian	30	13	1	16	43	57	−14	27	
14	Minerul Râmnicu Vâlcea	30	12	3	15	40	62	−22	27	
15	Progresul Băilești (R)	30	12	1	17	40	58	−18	25	Relegation to County Championship
16	Victoria Craiova (R)	30	3	4	23	22	76	−54	10	Relegation to County Championship

Source: romaniansoccer.ro
Rules for classification: 1) points; 2) goal difference; 3) number of goals scored.
(C) Champions; (P) Promoted; (R) Relegated

=== Seria VIII ===
Pos	Team	Pld	W	D	L	GF	GA	GD	Pts	Promotion or relegation
1	Strungul Arad (C, P)	30	19	3	8	73	32	+41	41	Promotion to Divizia B
2	Explormin Deva	30	19	2	9	73	31	+42	40	
3	Minerul Oravița	30	15	2	13	58	46	+12	32	
4	Șoimii Strungul Lipova	30	15	2	13	53	45	+8	32	
5	Electromotor Timișoara	30	14	1	15	50	53	−3	29	
6	Vulturii Textila Lugoj	30	14	1	15	49	52	−3	29	
7	CFR Arad	30	12	5	13	42	46	−4	29	
8	Gloria Reșița	30	14	1	15	48	53	−5	29	
9	Unirea Sânnicolau Mare	30	13	3	14	36	52	−16	29	
10	CFR Caransebeș	30	13	3	14	47	65	−18	29	
11	Metalul Bocșa	30	12	4	14	52	47	+5	28	
12	Unirea Tomnatic	30	13	2	15	36	47	−11	28	
13	Victoria Ineu	30	14	0	16	37	58	−21	28	
14	Minerul Certej	30	12	3	15	47	44	+3	27	
15	CPL Caransebeș (R)	30	12	3	15	37	47	−10	27	Relegation to County Championship
16	Metalul Oțelu Roșu (R)	30	11	1	18	50	70	−20	23	Relegation to County Championship

Source: romaniansoccer.ro
Rules for classification: 1) points; 2) goal difference; 3) number of goals scored.
(C) Champions; (P) Promoted; (R) Relegated

=== Seria IX ===
Pos	Team	Pld	W	D	L	GF	GA	GD	Pts	Promotion or relegation
1	Someșul Satu Mare (C, P)	30	19	3	8	61	27	+34	41	Promotion to Divizia B
2	Unirea Dej	30	17	1	12	48	51	−3	35	
3	Construcții Electrometal Cluj-Napoca	30	13	6	11	55	38	+17	32	
4	Industria Sârmei Câmpia Turzii	30	15	0	15	51	36	+15	30	
5	Victoria Carei	30	13	4	13	44	32	+12	30	
6	Voința Oradea	30	13	4	13	41	35	+6	30	
7	Oașul Negrești-Oaș	30	13	4	13	39	36	+3	30	
8	Bihoreana Marghita	30	15	3	12	59	45	+14	29 (Note: Bihoreana Marghita and Armătura Zalău deducted 4 points.)	
9	Armătura Zalău	30	15	3	12	58	49	+9	29	
10	Unirea Valea lui Mihai	30	12	5	13	41	58	−17	29	
11	Oțelul Bihor	30	12	4	14	42	50	−8	28	
12	Tricolorul Beiuș	30	13	2	15	33	45	−12	28	
13	Recolta Salonta	30	13	1	16	43	46	−3	27	
14	Victoria Elcond Zalău	30	11	5	14	35	42	−7	27	
15	Rapid Jibou (R)	30	10	7	13	37	57	−20	27	Relegation to County Championship
16	Metalul Carei (R)	30	8	4	18	32	72	−40	20	Relegation to County Championship

Source: romaniansoccer.ro
Rules for classification: 1) points; 2) goal difference; 3) number of goals scored.
(C) Champions; (P) Promoted; (R) Relegated

=== Seria X ===
Pos	Team	Pld	W	D	L	GF	GA	GD	Pts	Promotion or relegation
1	Minerul Ilba-Seini (C, P)	30	17	4	9	53	31	+22	38	Promotion to Divizia B
2	Minerul Rodna	30	16	3	11	57	28	+29	35	
3	Minerul Baia Sprie	30	14	5	11	56	34	+22	33	
4	Avântul Reghin	30	14	3	13	45	34	+11	31	
5	Oțelul Reghin	30	14	3	13	44	41	+3	31	
6	Foresta Bistrița	30	14	3	13	38	40	−2	31	
7	Minerul Baia Borșa	30	14	2	14	51	37	+14	30	
8	Cuprom Baia Mare	30	12	6	12	41	38	+3	30	
9	Minerul Băiuț	30	13	4	13	40	41	−1	30	
10	Lăpușul Târgu Lăpuș	30	14	2	14	41	49	−8	30	
11	Minerul Băița	30	12	5	13	44	44	0	29	
12	Textila Năsăud	30	13	3	14	40	54	−14	29	
13	Mureșul Luduș	30	11	6	13	39	40	−1	28	
14	Simared Baia Mare	30	11	4	15	37	50	−13	26	
15	Silvicultorul Maieru (R)	30	12	2	16	41	95	−54	26	Relegation to County Championship
16	Electrozahăr Târgu Mureș (R)	30	10	3	17	29	40	−11	23	Relegation to County Championship

Source: romaniansoccer.ro
Rules for classification: 1) points; 2) goal difference; 3) number of goals scored.
(C) Champions; (P) Promoted; (R) Relegated

=== Seria XI ===
Pos	Team	Pld	W	D	L	GF	GA	GD	Pts	Promotion or relegation
1	Carpați Mârșa (C, P)	30	17	5	8	65	24	+41	39	Promotion to Divizia B
2	Sticla Arieșul Turda	30	14	5	11	68	22	+46	33	
3	Victoria Călan	30	14	5	11	35	32	+3	33	
4	CFR Simeria	30	14	4	12	34	26	+8	32	
5	Minerul Ghelar	30	15	2	13	42	42	0	32	
6	IMIX Agnita	30	13	5	12	42	39	+3	31	
7	CIL Blaj	30	14	3	13	37	44	−7	31	
8	Minerul Știința Vulcan	30	12	6	12	48	49	−1	30	
9	Minerul Paroșeni	30	12	5	13	35	23	+12	29	
10	Unirea Alba Iulia	30	12	5	13	36	26	+10	29	
11	Textila IPA Sibiu	30	13	3	14	31	53	−22	29	
12	Vitrometan Mediaș	30	12	5	13	32	54	−22	29	
13	Automecanica Mediaș	30	11	6	13	34	38	−4	28	
14	CPL Sebeș	30	14	0	16	43	57	−14	28	
15	Metalul Copșa Mică (R)	30	12	3	15	32	62	−30	27	Relegation to County Championship
16	Construcții Sibiu (R)	30	8	4	18	35	58	−23	20	Relegation to County Championship

Source: romaniansoccer.ro
Rules for classification: 1) points; 2) goal difference; 3) number of goals scored.
(C) Champions; (P) Promoted; (R) Relegated

=== Seria XII ===
Pos	Team	Pld	W	D	L	GF	GA	GD	Pts	Promotion or relegation
1	ICIM Brașov (C, P)	30	22	4	4	62	23	+39	48	Promotion to Divizia B
2	Progresul Odorheiu Secuiesc	30	21	3	6	74	29	+45	45	
3	Metalul Sighișoara	30	17	5	8	46	18	+28	39	
4	Mureșul Toplița	30	15	5	10	48	31	+17	35	
5	Minerul Baraolt	30	14	4	12	54	44	+10	32	
6	Tractorul Miercurea Ciuc	30	13	5	12	35	37	−2	31	
7	Metrom Brașov	30	11	8	11	41	30	+11	30	
8	Mobila Măgura Codlea	30	12	5	13	37	40	−3	29	
9	Chimia Victoria	30	11	7	12	30	34	−4	29	
10	Torpedo Zărnești	30	13	2	15	42	42	0	28	
11	Carpați Brașov	30	11	6	13	30	41	−11	28	
12	Precizia Săcele	30	10	7	13	31	35	−4	27	
13	Metalul Târgu Secuiesc	30	11	5	14	32	37	−5	27	
14	Minerul Bălan	30	12	2	16	34	44	−10	26	
15	Constructorul Sfântu Gheorghe (R)	30	6	4	20	21	87	−66	16	Relegation to County Championship
16	CSU Brașov (R)	30	2	6	22	11	56	−45	10	Relegation to County Championship

Source: romaniansoccer.ro
Rules for classification: 1) points; 2) goal difference; 3) number of goals scored.
(C) Champions; (P) Promoted; (R) Relegated

== See also ==
- 1980–81 Divizia A
- 1980–81 Divizia B
- 1980–81 County Championship
- 1980–81 Cupa României
