= 1980–81 County Championship =

39th season of the Liga IV, the fourth tier of the Romanian football league

Liga IV
- Season: 1980–81

The 1980–81 County Championship was the 39th season of the Liga IV, the fourth tier of the Romanian football league system. The champions of each county association play against one from a neighboring county in a play-off to gain promotion to Divizia C.

== County championships ==
- Alba (AB)
- Arad (AR)
- Argeș (AG)
- Bacău (BC)
- Bihor (BH)
- Bistrița-Năsăud (BN)
- Botoșani (BT)
- Brașov (BV)
- Brăila (BR)
- Bucharest (B)
- Buzău (BZ)
- Caraș-Severin (CS)
- Călărași (CL)
- Cluj (CJ)
- Constanța (CT)
- Covasna (CV)
- Dâmbovița (DB)
- Dolj (DJ)
- Galați (GL)
- Giurgiu (GR)
- Gorj (GJ)
- Harghita (HR)
- Hunedoara (HD)
- Ialomița (IL)
- Iași (IS)
- Ilfov (IF)
- Maramureș (MM)
- Mehedinți (MH)
- Mureș (MS)
- Neamț (NT)
- Olt (OT)
- Prahova (PH)
- Satu Mare (SM)
- Sălaj (SJ)
- Sibiu (SB)
- Suceava (SV)
- Teleorman (TR)
- Timiș (TM)
- Tulcea (TL)
- Vaslui (VS)
- Vâlcea (VL)
- Vrancea (VN)

== Promotion play-off ==
Teams promoted to Divizia C without a play-off matches as teams from less represented counties in the third division.

- (SM) Chimia Tășnad
- (SJ) Silvania Cehu Silvaniei
- (BZ) Chimia Buzău
- (VS) Metalul Huși
- (BR) Autobuzul Făurei
- (GR) Petrolul Roata de Jos
- (CV) Metalul Sfântu Gheorghe

Preliminary round

Team 1	Agg.	Team 2	1st leg	2nd leg
Fulgerul Cernica (IF)	–	(B) Dinamo Victoria București	–	3–4

The matches were played on 5 and 12 July 1981.

Play-off round

Team 1	Agg.	Team 2	1st leg	2nd leg
Constructorul Beclean (BN)	0–4	(HR) Unirea Cristuru Secuiesc	0–0	0–4
Chimia Găești (DB)	6–4	(DJ) Unirea Tricolor Dăbuleni	5–1	1–3
Granitul Babadag (TL)	7–1	(GL) Gloria IMN Galați	5–0	2–1
Victoria Lehliu (CL)	2–3	(TR) Dunărea Venus Zimnicea	2–0	0–3
ICM Caransebeș (CS)	3–4	(AR) Chimia Arad	2–1	1–3
Metalotehnica Târgu Mureș (MS)	5–1	(SV) CFR Suceava	3–1	2–0
Utilajul Făgăraș (BV)	8–1	(VL) Cauciucul Dragașani	3–0	5–1
Constructorul Pitești (AG)	5–2	(OT) Victoria Caracal	3–0	2–2
Unirea Livezile (MH)	3–4	(GJ) Parângul Novaci	2–3	1–1
Inter Sibiu (SB)	1–2	(AB) Mecanica Alba Iulia	1–0	0–2
CFR Constanța (CT)	4–8	(B) Dinamo Victoria București	2–3	2–5
Constructorul Timișoara (TM)	3–3 (1–3 p)	(HD) Minerul Aninoasa	3–0	0–3
Integrata Pașcani (IS)	3–1	(BC) Barajul TCH Bacău	3–0	0–1
Bihorul Beiuș (BH)	4–2	(CJ) Olimpia Gherla	4–0	0–2
Unirea Săveni (BT)	3–6	(MM) Bradul Vișeu de Sus	3–4	0–2
Voința Roznov (NT)	0–6	(VN) Rapid Panciu	0–1	0–5
Minerul Filipeștii de Pădure (PH)	6–1 (Note: The matches was played on 12 and 15 July 1981.)	(IL) Unirea Gârbovi	4–0	2–1

== Championships standings ==
=== Arad County ===
Pos	Team	Pld	W	D	L	GF	GA	GD	Pts	Qualification or relegation
1	Chimia Arad (C, Q)	34	27	4	3	88	24	+64	58	Qualification to promotion play-off
2	Gloria Arad	34	26	5	3	80	16	+64	57	
3	Frontiera Curtici	34	14	10	10	58	42	+16	38	
4	Șiriana Șiria	34	15	6	13	61	45	+16	36	
5	Gloria Ineu	34	16	4	14	56	42	+14	34 (Note: Gloria Ineu and Dacia Beliu deducted 2 points.)	
6	Stăruința Dorobanți	34	15	4	15	49	48	+1	34	
7	Șoimii Pâncota	34	13	7	14	47	41	+6	33	
8	CPL Arad	34	11	11	12	37	38	−1	33	
9	Progresul Pecica	34	10	13	11	43	44	−1	33	
10	Strungul Chișineu-Criș	34	14	5	15	52	59	−7	33	
11	Crișana Sebiș	34	12	8	14	48	62	−14	32	
12	Motorul Arad	34	11	9	14	51	49	+2	31	
13	Unirea Șofronea	34	14	3	17	67	81	−14	31	
14	Victoria Nădlac	34	12	6	16	46	55	−9	30	
15	Unirea Șeitin	34	11	7	16	49	61	−12	29	
16	Mureșul Zădăreni	34	13	3	18	58	72	−14	29	
17	Dacia Beliu	34	8	5	21	40	92	−52	19	
18	Înfrățirea Iratoșu	34	7	4	23	28	87	−59	18	

Rules for classification: 1) Points; 2) Goal difference; 3) Number of goals scored.
(C) Champions; (Q) Qualified for the phase indicated

=== Botoșani County ===
Series I

Pos	Team	Pld	W	D	L	GF	GA	GD	Pts	Qualification or relegation
1	Electro Botoșani (Q)	30	23	4	3	101	30	+71	50	Qualification to championship final
2	Luceafărul Botoșani	30	22	5	3	106	42	+64	49	
3	Flacăra Flămânzi	30	21	1	8	93	50	+43	43	
4	Intex Botoșani	30	16	2	12	74	55	+19	34	
5	Zorile Roma	30	16	0	14	80	72	+8	32	
6	Avântul Mihai Eminescu	30	14	4	12	66	65	+1	32	
7	Viitorul Dersca	30	15	1	14	65	68	−3	31	
8	Voința Mândrești	30	13	4	13	50	50	0	30	
9	Înainte Copălău	30	14	2	14	47	67	−20	30	
10	Sănătatea Dorohoi	30	11	3	16	68	69	−1	25	
11	Voința Costești	30	11	3	16	53	77	−24	25	
12	Recolta Corni	30	12	0	18	61	77	−16	24	
13	Volanul Cătămărăști	30	9	4	17	61	82	−21	22	
14	Spicul Brăești	30	9	1	20	44	77	−33	19	
15	Progresul Nicșeni	30	6	7	17	39	84	−45	19	
16	Melana Botoșani	30	5	1	24	29	85	−56	11	

Rules for classification: 1) Points; 2) Goal difference; 3) Number of goals scored.
(Q) Qualified for the phase indicated

Series II

Pos	Team	Pld	W	D	L	GF	GA	GD	Pts	Qualification or relegation
1	Unirea Săveni (Q)	30	23	5	2	121	29	+92	51	Qualification to championship final
2	Avântul Albești	30	20	4	6	90	44	+46	44	
3	Munca Drăgușeni	30	19	3	8	80	54	+26	41	
4	Spicul Avrămeni	30	18	3	9	79	54	+25	39	
5	Zorile Havârna	30	15	3	12	59	54	+5	33	
6	Spicul Iacobeni	30	14	3	13	62	59	+3	31	
7	Sportivul Ripiceni	30	14	3	13	68	75	−7	31	
8	Sănătatea Darabani	30	13	4	13	65	59	+6	30	
9	Prutul Mitoc	30	13	3	14	71	57	+14	29	
10	Gloria Todireni	30	12	5	13	56	57	−1	29	
11	Recolta Păltiniș	30	10	4	16	55	74	−19	24	
12	Rapid Ungureni	30	9	3	18	45	61	−16	21	
13	Scânteia Liveni	30	9	3	18	50	86	−36	21	
14	Confecția Săveni	30	7	5	18	60	92	−32	19	
15	Avântul Miorcani	30	8	3	19	57	125	−68	19	
16	Recolta Hlipiceni	30	9	0	21	42	80	−38	18	

Rules for classification: 1) Points; 2) Goal difference; 3) Number of goals scored.
(Q) Qualified for the phase indicated

Championship final

Team 1	Agg.	Team 2	1st leg	2nd leg
Electro Botoșani	3–3 (Note: Unirea Săveni won on the away goals rule.)	Unirea Săveni	3–2	0–1

Unirea Săveni won the Botoșani County Championship and qualify for promotion play-off in Divizia C.

=== Caraș-Severin County ===
Series I

Pos	Team	Pld	W	D	L	GF	GA	GD	Pts	Qualification or relegation
1	ICM Caransebeș (Q)	20	13	2	5	53	19	+34	28	Qualification to championship final
2	Nera Bozovici	20	13	2	5	56	21	+35	28	
3	Siderurgistul Reșița	20	13	2	5	43	18	+25	28	
4	Progresul Băile Herculane	20	11	1	8	42	20	+22	23	
5	Bistra Glimboca	20	9	4	7	42	35	+7	22	
6	Minerul Mehadia	20	8	3	9	26	35	−9	19	
7	Șoimii Cuptoare	20	8	1	11	35	57	−22	19 (Note: Șoimii Cuptoare deducted 2 points.)	
8	Victoria Caransebeș	20	7	4	9	31	41	−10	18	
9	Foresta Zăvoi	20	8	1	11	41	38	+3	17	
10	Minerul Ruschița	20	4	2	14	20	63	−43	10	
11	Minerul Eftimie Murgu	0	0	0	0	0	0	0	0	

Rules for classification: 1) Points; 2) Goal difference; 3) Number of goals scored.
(Q) Qualified for the phase indicated
Notes:

Series II

Pos	Team	Pld	W	D	L	GF	GA	GD	Pts	Qualification or relegation
1	Mecanica Reșița (Q)	20	14	4	2	59	17	+42	32	Qualification to championship final
2	Muncitorul Știința Reșița	20	10	5	5	41	16	+25	25	
3	Energia Reșița	20	10	4	6	49	23	+26	24	
4	Minerul Ocna de Fier	20	9	4	7	33	23	+10	22	
5	Minerul Sasca Montană	20	8	5	7	22	20	+2	21	
6	Dunărea Belobreșca	20	9	1	10	43	50	−7	19	
7	ATA Oravița	20	8	3	9	35	47	−12	19	
8	Minerul Dognecea	20	7	2	11	27	42	−15	16	
9	Comerțul Bocșa	20	7	2	11	25	54	−29	16	
10	Autoforesta Bocșa	20	7	1	12	25	42	−17	15	
11	Metalul Moldova Nouă	20	4	3	13	17	38	−21	11	

Rules for classification: 1) Points; 2) Goal difference; 3) Number of goals scored.
(Q) Qualified for the phase indicated

Championship final

Team 1	Agg.	Team 2	1st leg	2nd leg
ICM Caransebeș	1–0	Mecanica Reșița	1–0	0–0

ICM Caransebeș won the Caraș-Severin County Championship and qualify for promotion play-off in Divizia C.

=== Covasna County ===
Pos	Team	Pld	W	D	L	GF	GA	GD	Pts	Qualification or relegation
1	Metalul Sfântu Gheorghe (C, Q)	34	26	6	2	126	17	+109	58	Qualification to promotion play-off
2	Carpați Covasna	34	20	4	10	84	38	+46	44	
3	Electro Sfântu Gheorghe	34	19	6	9	85	54	+31	44	
4	Stăruința Bodoc	34	20	4	10	78	52	+26	44	
5	Stăruința Cernat	34	18	4	12	67	43	+24	40	
6	IAS Câmpu Frumos	34	15	9	10	68	54	+14	39	
7	Unirea Reci	34	16	6	12	75	65	+10	38	
8	Apemin Biborțeni	34	15	7	12	68	68	0	37	
9	Progresul Catalina	34	15	5	14	78	66	+12	35	
10	Perkő Sânzieni	34	14	4	16	62	62	0	32	
11	Venus Ozun	34	14	4	16	50	63	−13	32	
12	Ciucașul Întorsura Buzăului	34	12	5	17	55	73	−18	29	
13	Progresul Chichiș	34	13	2	19	48	69	−21	28	
14	Victoria Fotoș	34	12	4	18	52	80	−28	28	
15	Recolta Tamașfalău	34	12	3	19	52	90	−38	27	
16	Forestierul Brețcu	34	10	6	18	51	100	−49	24 (Note: Forestierul Brețcu deducted 2 points.)	
17	Voința Căpeni	34	7	5	22	47	100	−53	19	
18	Agricultorul Angheluș	34	5	2	27	33	93	−60	12	

Rules for classification: 1) Points; 2) Goal difference; 3) Number of goals scored.
(C) Champions; (Q) Qualified for the phase indicated

=== Harghita County ===
Pos	Team	Pld	W	D	L	GF	GA	GD	Pts	Qualification or relegation
1	Unirea Cristuru Secuiesc (C, Q)	26	20	2	4	63	22	+41	42	Qualification to promotion play-off
2	Mobila Ditrău	26	14	4	8	49	21	+28	32	
3	Avântul Miercurea Ciuc	26	13	5	8	52	35	+17	31	
4	Flamura Roșie Sânsimion	26	13	4	9	53	30	+23	30	
5	Bradul Hodoșa	26	11	5	10	47	36	+11	27	
6	Metalul Vlăhița	26	9	8	9	36	33	+3	26	
7	Rapid Porumbenii Mari	25	10	6	9	37	47	−10	26	
8	Șoimii Băile Tușnad	26	12	1	13	39	52	−13	25	
9	Făgetul Borsec	26	11	3	12	32	52	−20	25	
10	Complexul Gălăuțaș	25	10	4	11	47	52	−5	24	
11	ITA Cârța	26	12	0	14	39	45	−6	24	
12	Minerul Lueta (R)	25	5	9	11	31	50	−19	19	Relegation to Harghita County Championship II
13	Progresul Odorheiu Secuiesc II (R)	25	7	2	16	37	63	−26	16	Relegation to Harghita County Championship II
14	Avântul Lunca de Jos (R)	26	4	5	17	39	63	−24	13	Relegation to Harghita County Championship II

Rules for classification: 1) Points; 2) Goal difference; 3) Number of goals scored.
(C) Champions; (Q) Qualified for the phase indicated; (R) Relegated

=== Hunedoara County ===
Pos	Team	Pld	W	D	L	GF	GA	GD	Pts	Qualification or relegation
1	Minerul Aninoasa (C, Q)	22	18	2	2	50	14	+36	38	Qualification to promotion play-off
2	Constructorul Hunedoara	22	14	3	5	53	21	+32	31	
3	Minerul Uricani	22	12	3	7	66	23	+43	27	
4	IMC Bârcea	22	11	4	7	48	37	+11	26	
5	Parângul Lonea	22	12	0	10	31	24	+7	24	
6	Metalul Simeria	22	8	3	11	30	34	−4	19	
7	Mecanica Orăștie	22	8	3	11	29	42	−13	19	
8	Avântul Hațeg	22	8	3	11	23	47	−24	19	
9	IGCL Hunedoara	22	8	1	13	24	54	−30	17	
10	Minerul Teliuc	22	7	2	13	31	50	−19	16	
11	Metalul Crișcior	22	6	3	13	27	41	−14	15	
12	Preparatorul Petrila	22	5	3	14	24	55	−31	13	

Rules for classification: 1) Points; 2) Goal difference; 3) Number of goals scored.
(C) Champions; (Q) Qualified for the phase indicated

=== Mureș County ===
Pos	Team	Pld	W	D	L	GF	GA	GD	Pts	Qualification or relegation
1	Metalotehnica Târgu Mureș (C, Q)	34	26	4	4	92	12	+80	56	Qualification to promotion play-off
2	Sticla Târnăveni	34	19	6	9	66	37	+29	44	
3	Autobuzul Târnăveni	34	17	6	11	60	34	+26	40	
4	IRA Târgu Mureș	34	17	4	13	50	43	+7	38	
5	Viitorul Târgu Mureș	34	16	4	14	61	50	+11	36	
6	Metalul Reghin	34	15	6	13	50	42	+8	36	
7	Voința Sărmaşu	34	15	5	14	50	61	−11	35	
8	Voința Miercurea Nirajului	34	13	8	13	54	54	0	34	
9	Lacul Ursu Sovata	34	13	8	13	48	50	−2	34	
10	Recolta Vidrasău	34	13	7	14	45	44	+1	33	
11	Viitorul Aluniş	34	14	4	16	54	60	−6	32	
12	Faianța Sighişoara	34	12	7	15	52	45	+7	31	
13	Constructorul Târgu Mureș	34	11	11	12	42	53	−11	33	
14	Energia Iernut	34	10	10	14	40	52	−12	30	
15	Unirea Ungheni	34	13	4	17	37	53	−16	30	
16	Voința Sângeorgiu de Pădure	34	12	3	19	46	63	−17	27	
17	Comerțul Reghin	34	11	5	18	37	62	−25	27	
18	Zahărul Luduș	34	5	4	25	22	97	−75	14	

Rules for classification: 1) Points; 2) Goal difference; 3) Number of goals scored.
(C) Champions; (Q) Qualified for the phase indicated

=== Olt County ===
North Series

Pos	Team	Pld	W	D	L	GF	GA	GD	Pts	Qualification or relegation
1	Laminorul IPA Slatina (Q)	30	26	0	4	88	19	+69	52	Qualification to championship final
2	Rapid Piatra-Olt	30	20	3	7	105	34	+71	43	
3	Potcoava	30	17	4	9	64	41	+23	38	
4	Balestiera Milcov	30	15	6	9	54	44	+10	36	
5	Dârjovul Valea Mare	30	15	1	14	77	68	+9	31	
6	Sporting Slatina	30	14	3	13	56	54	+2	31	
7	Avântul Osica	30	11	6	13	50	54	−4	28	
8	Recolta Izvoarele	30	10	7	13	42	49	−7	27	
9	Viitorul Brebeni	30	12	3	15	40	63	−23	27	
10	Avântul Priseaca	30	12	2	16	52	56	−4	26	
11	Unirea Turia	30	11	3	16	48	54	−6	25	
12	Recolta Bălteni	30	12	1	17	42	62	−20	25	
13	Unirea Pârșcoveni	30	11	3	16	52	72	−20	25	
14	Voința Balș (R)	30	10	4	16	46	76	−30	24	Relegation to Olt County Championship II
15	Avântul Morunglav (R)	30	10	4	16	47	69	−22	24	Relegation to Olt County Championship II
16	Victoria Dobrun (R)	30	7	4	19	40	89	−49	18	Relegation to Olt County Championship II

Rules for classification: 1) Points; 2) Goal difference; 3) Number of goals scored.
(Q) Qualified for the phase indicated; (R) Relegated

South Series

Pos	Team	Pld	W	D	L	GF	GA	GD	Pts	Qualification or relegation
1	Victoria Caracal (Q)	30	21	8	1	96	31	+65	50	Qualification to championship final
2	Voința Stefan cel Mare	30	23	3	4	95	29	+66	49	
3	Știința Drăgănești-Olt	30	21	4	5	79	24	+55	46	
4	Columna Traian	30	20	2	8	80	34	+46	42	
5	Textila Drăgănești-Olt	30	16	4	10	80	39	+41	36	
6	Gloria Deveselu	30	13	4	13	64	65	−1	30	
7	Voința Băbiciu	30	13	3	14	76	72	+4	29	
8	Oltul Izbiceni	30	14	1	15	61	80	−19	29	
9	Recolta Urzica	30	12	2	16	61	70	−9	26	
10	Viitorul Orlea	30	11	4	15	54	66	−12	26	
11	Unirea Radomirești	30	12	1	17	63	68	−5	25	
12	Avântul Vișina	30	10	4	16	58	107	−49	24	
13	Viitorul Vișina Nouă	30	9	1	20	58	67	−9	19	
14	Gloria Seaca (R)	30	8	2	20	56	93	−37	18	Relegation to Olt County Championship II
15	Valea Oltului Cilieni (R)	30	7	3	20	50	98	−48	17	Relegation to Olt County Championship II
16	Unirea Comanca (R)	30	6	2	22	31	106	−75	14	Relegation to Olt County Championship II

Rules for classification: 1) Points; 2) Goal difference; 3) Number of goals scored.
(Q) Qualified for the phase indicated; (R) Relegated

Championship final

Team 1	Agg.	Team 2	1st leg	2nd leg
Victoria Caracal	1–0	Laminorul IPA Slatina	1–0	0–0

Victoria Caracal won the Olt County Championship and qualify for promotion play-off in Divizia C.

=== Prahova County ===
Pos	Team	Pld	W	D	L	GF	GA	GD	Pts	Qualification or relegation
1	Minerul Filipeștii de Pădure (C, Q)	34	23	8	3	83	16	+67	54	Qualification to promotion play-off
2	Electromotor Câmpina	34	19	7	8	70	35	+35	45	
3	Petrolistul Boldești	34	19	7	8	61	31	+30	45	
4	Rapid Mizil	34	16	8	10	56	43	+13	40	
5	Victoria Florești	34	17	5	12	66	41	+25	39	
6	Avântul Măneciu	34	17	5	12	61	50	+11	39	
7	Tricolorul Breaza	34	13	10	11	54	52	+2	36	
8	IUC Ploiești	34	15	5	14	57	46	+11	35	
9	Metalul Filipeștii de Pădure	34	13	8	13	44	48	−4	34	
10	IRA Câmpina	34	11	11	12	46	49	−3	33	
11	Chimistul Valea Călugărească	34	14	4	16	45	55	−10	32	
12	Unirea Teleajen Ploiești	34	10	11	13	40	39	+1	31	
13	Geamul Scăieni	34	10	9	15	37	55	−18	29	
14	Petrolul PECO Ploiești	34	10	9	15	42	60	−18	29	
15	Electrica Câmpina	34	12	5	17	53	72	−19	29	
16	Metalul Câmpina	34	11	5	18	45	63	−18	27	
17	Feroemail Ploiești (Note: Feroemail Ploiești was spared from relegation due to the promotion of Minerul Filipeștii de Pădure in Divizia C.)	34	5	10	19	36	67	−31	20	Spared from relegation
18	Viitorul Slănic (R)	34	6	3	25	25	99	−74	15	Relegation to Prahova County Championship II

Rules for classification: 1) Points; 2) Goal difference; 3) Number of goals scored.
(C) Champions; (Q) Qualified for the phase indicated; (R) Relegated

=== Sălaj County ===
Pos	Team	Pld	W	D	L	GF	GA	GD	Pts	Qualification or relegation
1	Silvania Cehu Silvaniei (C, Q)	26	19	3	4	72	15	+57	41	Qualification to promotion play-off
2	Voința Derșida	26	14	6	6	59	37	+22	34	
3	Minerul Sărmășag	26	15	2	9	66	35	+31	32	
4	Minerul Surduc	26	13	4	9	54	40	+14	30	
5	Integrata Jibou	26	12	4	10	51	38	+13	28	
6	Energia Sânmihaiu Almașului	26	12	4	10	34	33	+1	28	
7	Spartac Crasna	26	10	7	9	37	32	+5	27	
8	Recolta Agrij	26	10	4	12	66	75	−9	24	
9	Minerul Letca	26	9	6	11	51	61	−10	24	
10	Izolatorul Șimleu Silvaniei	26	10	4	12	46	66	−20	24	
11	Avântul Lompirt	26	9	2	15	41	53	−12	20	
12	Olimpic Bocșa	26	8	4	14	35	54	−19	20	
13	Progresul Bălan	26	7	5	14	33	62	−29	19	
14	Victoria Românași	26	5	3	18	27	71	−44	13	

Rules for classification: 1) Points; 2) Goal difference; 3) Number of goals scored.
(C) Champions; (Q) Qualified for the phase indicated

=== Sibiu County ===
Pos	Team	Pld	W	D	L	GF	GA	GD	Pts	Qualification or relegation
1	Inter Sibiu (C, Q)	32	27	2	3	122	16	+106	56	Qualification to promotion play-off
2	Metalul IO Sibiu	32	25	5	2	108	22	+86	55	
3	CSU Sibiu	32	22	4	6	61	26	+35	48	
4	Unirea Ocna Sibiului	32	19	6	7	94	29	+65	44	
5	Progresul Dumbrăveni	32	14	7	11	62	52	+10	35	
6	Sparta Mediaș	32	13	9	10	52	47	+5	35	
7	Șantierul Sibiu	32	17	1	14	59	73	−14	35	
8	Mecanica Sibiu	32	13	5	14	71	58	+13	31	
9	Record Mediaș	32	10	10	12	63	51	+12	30	
10	Carbosin Copșa Mică	32	13	4	15	55	62	−7	30	
11	Textila Cisnădie	32	12	2	18	52	62	−10	26	
12	Textila Mediaș	32	9	5	18	33	66	−33	23	
13	Spicul Șeica	32	10	3	19	44	111	−67	23	
14	CFR Sibiu	32	10	2	20	44	87	−43	22	
15	Voința Sibiu	32	7	6	19	37	69	−32	20	
16	Viitorul Nocrich	32	8	3	21	30	92	−62	19	
17	Geamul Târnava	32	3	6	23	21	85	−64	12	

Rules for classification: 1) Points; 2) Goal difference; 3) Number of goals scored.
(C) Champions; (Q) Qualified for the phase indicated

== See also ==
- 1980–81 Divizia A
- 1980–81 Divizia B
- 1980–81 Divizia C
- 1980–81 Cupa României
