= 1979–80 Divizia C =

Third tier Romanian football league

Divizia C
- Season: 1979–80

The 1979–80 Divizia C was the 24th season of Liga III, the third tier of the Romanian football league system.

== Team changes ==
=== To Divizia C ===
Relegated from Divizia B

- Relon Ceahlăul Piatra Neamț
- Drobeta-Turnu Severin
- Mureșul Deva
- Oltul Sfântu Gheorghe
- Electroputere Craiova
- CIL Sighetu Marmației
- Victoria Tecuci
- Șantierul Naval Oltenița
- Victoria Călan
- Constructorul Iași
- Chimia Brazi
- CFR Timișoara

Promoted from County Championship

- Celuloza Piatra Neamț
- Textila Buhuși
- ASA Iași
- FNC Săhăteni
- Șantierul Naval Brăila
- Rapid Fetești
- Progresul Isaccea
- Viitorul Chirnogi
- Danubiana București
- Electrodul Slatina
- Petrolul Târgoviște
- Dunărea Calafat
- Unirea Drobeta-Turnu Severin
- CPL Caransebeș
- Explorări Deva
- Victoria Elcond Zalău
- Alumina Oradea
- Metalul Carei
- Simared Baia Mare
- CPL Sebeș
- Vitrometan Mediaș
- Faianța Sighișoara
- Mureșul Toplița
- Carpați Covasna

=== From Divizia C ===
Promoted to Divizia B

- CS Botoșani
- Energia Gheorghiu-Dej
- Unirea Focșani
- Cimentul Medgidia
- Mecanică Fină București
- Flacăra-Automecanica Moreni
- Pandurii Târgu Jiu
- Unirea Alba Iulia
- Strungul Arad
- Someșul Satu Mare
- Carpați Mârșa
- Viitorul Gheorgheni

Relegated to County Championship

- Tepro Iași
- Unirea Săveni
- Aripile Bacău
- Oituz Târgu Ocna
- Petrolistul Boldești
- Metalosport Galați
- Tractorul Viziru
- Arrubium Măcin
- Automecanica București
- Victoria Lehliu
- Chimia Găești
- Cetatea Turnu Măgurele
- Forestierul Băbeni
- Constructorul Târgu Jiu
- ICRAL Timișoara
- Metalul Hunedoara
- Minerul Bihor
- Tehnofrig Cluj-Napoca
- Rapid Jibou
- Viitorul Șimleu Silvaniei
- Inter Sibiu
- Textila Cisnădie
- Avântul Măneciu
- IRA Câmpina

=== Renamed teams ===
Electrodul Slatina was renamed as IPC Slatina.

Avântul Urziceni was renamed as Ferom Urziceni.

Azotul Slobozia was renamed as Amonil Slobozia.

Unirea Tricolor Brăila was renamed as Chimia Brăila.

Celuloza Călărași was renamed as Dunărea Călărași.

Unirea Drăgășani was renamed as Viitorul Drăgășani.

Minerul Rovinari was renamed as Metalul Rovinari.

Gloria Drobeta-Turnu Severin was moved from Drobeta-Turnu Severin to Strehaia and was renamed as Gloria Strehaia.

Mureșul Deva was renamed as Minerul Deva.

Alumina Oradea was renamed as Unirea Oradea.

CFR Constructorul Arad was renamed as CFR Arad.

Construcții Montaj Cluj-Napoca was renamed as Construcții Electrometal Cluj-Napoca.

Izvorul Târgu Secuiesc was renamed as Metalul Târgu Secuiesc.

=== Other changes ===
Relonul Săvinești took the place of Bradul Roznov.

Automecanica București spared from relegation due to the withdrawal of Unirea Tricolor București

== League tables ==
=== Seria I ===
Pos	Team	Pld	W	D	L	GF	GA	GD	Pts	Promotion or relegation
1	Ceahlăul Piatra Neamț (C, P)	30	21	3	6	62	21	+41	45	Promotion to Divizia B
2	Foresta Fălticeni	30	17	4	9	52	23	+29	38	
3	Avântul TCMM Frasin	30	16	3	11	57	29	+28	35	
4	ASA Câmpulung Moldovenesc	30	14	4	12	42	31	+11	32	
5	Dorna Vatra Dornei	30	15	1	14	49	51	−2	31	
6	Laminorul Roman	30	15	0	15	57	41	+16	30	
7	Metalul Botoșani	30	13	4	13	34	44	−10	30	
8	Cetatea Târgu Neamț	30	14	2	14	39	52	−13	30	
9	Siretul Bucecea	30	13	3	14	61	61	0	29	
10	Celuloza Piatra Neamț	30	12	5	13	37	42	−5	29	
11	Metalul Rădăuți	30	13	2	15	46	52	−6	28	
12	Cristalul Dorohoi	30	12	4	14	35	47	−12	28	
13	Zimbrul Suceava	30	11	5	14	42	46	−4	27	
14	Cimentul Bicaz	30	12	3	15	38	48	−10	27	
15	IM Piatra Neamț (R)	30	10	5	15	42	64	−22	25	Relegation to County Championship
16	Danubiana Roman (R)	30	6	4	20	28	69	−41	16	Relegation to County Championship

Source: romaniansoccer.ro
Rules for classification: 1) points; 2) goal difference; 3) number of goals scored.
(C) Champions; (P) Promoted; (R) Relegated

=== Seria II ===
Pos	Team	Pld	W	D	L	GF	GA	GD	Pts	Promotion or relegation
1	Borzești (C, P)	30	21	5	4	69	16	+53	47	Promotion to Divizia B
2	Minerul Comănești	30	16	6	8	49	25	+24	38	
3	Partizanul Bacău	30	16	2	12	56	39	+17	34	
4	Letea Bacău	30	14	6	10	50	35	+15	34	
5	Relonul Săvinești	30	14	6	10	34	30	+4	34	
6	CFR Pașcani	30	14	4	12	44	38	+6	32	
7	Constructorul Iași	30	12	5	13	52	44	+8	29	
8	Textila Buhuși	30	13	3	14	53	53	0	29	
9	Demar Mărășești	30	12	5	13	39	60	−21	29	
10	Petrolul Moinești	30	11	6	13	38	34	+4	28	
11	Rulmentul Bârlad	30	12	3	15	31	33	−2	27	
12	Nicolina Iași	30	9	8	13	38	47	−9	26	
13	Hușana Huși	30	11	3	16	42	53	−11	25	
14	Luceafărul Adjud	30	10	5	15	38	52	−14	25	
15	Constructorul Vaslui (R)	30	11	3	16	22	51	−29	25	Relegation to County Championship
16	ASA Iași (R)	30	6	6	18	31	76	−45	18	Relegation to County Championship

Source: romaniansoccer.ro
Rules for classification: 1) points; 2) goal difference; 3) number of goals scored.
(C) Champions; (P) Promoted; (R) Relegated

=== Seria III ===
Pos	Team	Pld	W	D	L	GF	GA	GD	Pts	Promotion or relegation
1	CSU Galați (C, P)	30	20	2	8	72	27	+45	42	Promotion to Divizia B
2	Prahova Ploiești	30	16	4	10	54	37	+17	36	
3	Dinamo CPL Focșani	30	16	3	11	48	38	+10	35	
4	Chimia Brazi	30	16	1	13	57	31	+26	33	
5	Caraimanul Bușteni	30	13	7	10	46	25	+21	33	
6	Carpați Sinaia	30	15	3	12	52	41	+11	33	
7	Olimpia Râmnicu Sărat	30	14	3	13	32	33	−1	31	
8	Foresta Gugești	30	13	3	14	43	53	−10	29	
9	Oțelul Galați	30	13	3	14	38	52	−14	29	
10	Victoria Tecuci	30	12	4	14	36	45	−9	28	
11	Ancora Galați	30	12	3	15	47	61	−14	27	
12	Petrolul Băicoi	30	11	4	15	48	43	+5	26	
13	Petrolul Berca	30	12	2	16	39	47	−8	26	
14	Carpați Nehoiu	30	10	6	14	27	41	−14	26	
15	Chimia Buzău (R)	30	11	2	17	51	68	−17	24	Relegation to County Championship
16	FNC Săhăteni (R)	30	10	2	18	26	74	−48	22	Relegation to County Championship

Source: romaniansoccer.ro
Rules for classification: 1) points; 2) goal difference; 3) number of goals scored.
(C) Champions; (P) Promoted; (R) Relegated

=== Seria IV ===
Pos	Team	Pld	W	D	L	GF	GA	GD	Pts	Promotion or relegation
1	IMU Medgidia (C, P)	30	19	6	5	63	24	+39	44	Promotion to Divizia B
2	Amonil Slobozia	30	20	1	9	67	32	+35	41 (Note: The match Dacia Unirea Brăila – Amonil Slobozia (10–1), from last round, was lost by both teams with 0–3.)	
3	Șoimii Cernavodă	30	13	9	8	51	36	+15	35	
4	Marina Mangalia	30	14	6	10	49	45	+4	34	
5	Pescărușul Tulcea	30	14	5	11	53	43	+10	33	
6	Electrica Constanța	30	15	2	13	46	44	+2	32	
7	Voința Constanța	30	12	7	11	48	44	+4	31	
8	Șantierul Naval Brăila	30	12	6	12	49	50	−1	30	
9	Chimpex Constanța	30	11	6	13	34	34	0	28	
10	Unirea Știința Eforie Nord	30	11	5	14	44	52	−8	27	
11	Victoria Țăndărei	30	12	3	15	37	49	−12	27	
12	Rapid Fetești	30	11	4	15	44	47	−3	26	
13	Chimia Brăila	30	11	4	15	35	43	−8	26	
14	Progresul Isaccea	30	12	2	16	50	63	−13	26	
15	Dacia Unirea Brăila (R)	30	7	10	13	29	53	−24	24	Relegation to County Championship
16	Granitul Babadag (R)	30	4	6	20	24	70	−46	14	Relegation to County Championship

Source: romaniansoccer.ro
Rules for classification: 1) points; 2) goal difference; 3) number of goals scored.
(C) Champions; (P) Promoted; (R) Relegated

=== Seria V ===
Pos	Team	Pld	W	D	L	GF	GA	GD	Pts	Promotion or relegation
1	Sirena București (C, P)	30	18	9	3	53	18	+35	45	Promotion to Divizia B
2	Automatica București	30	19	6	5	64	25	+39	44	
3	Dunărea Călărași	30	15	8	7	45	32	+13	38	
4	Electronica Obor București	30	11	9	10	36	32	+4	31	
5	Voința București	30	13	5	12	40	37	+3	31	
6	Șantierul Naval Oltenița	30	10	11	9	27	26	+1	31	
7	Viitorul Chirnogi	30	12	6	12	33	39	−6	30	
8	Tehnometal București	30	12	5	13	40	36	+4	29	
9	Danubiana București	30	11	6	13	28	32	−4	28	
10	TMB București	30	9	9	12	32	34	−2	27	
11	ICSIM București	30	10	7	13	36	40	−4	27	
12	Ferom Urziceni	30	10	7	13	43	48	−5	27	
13	Flacăra Roșie București	30	9	9	12	23	30	−7	27	
14	Abatorul București	30	9	9	12	34	45	−11	27	
15	Automecanica București (R)	30	9	7	14	35	43	−8	25	Relegation to County Championship
16	Vâscoza București (R)	30	3	7	20	27	79	−52	13	Relegation to County Championship

Source: romaniansoccer.ro
Rules for classification: 1) points; 2) goal difference; 3) number of goals scored.
(C) Champions; (P) Promoted; (R) Relegated

=== Seria VI ===
Pos	Team	Pld	W	D	L	GF	GA	GD	Pts	Promotion or relegation
1	Rova Roșiorii de Vede (C, P)	30	19	5	6	55	23	+32	43	Promotion to Divizia B
2	Metalul Mija	30	17	3	10	57	32	+25	37	
3	Sportul Muncitoresc Caracal	30	15	3	12	55	34	+21	33	
4	Progresul Pucioasa	30	13	7	10	46	26	+20	33	
5	Petrolul Videle	30	13	6	11	36	30	+6	32	
6	Electronistul Curtea de Argeș	30	13	6	11	43	46	−3	32	
7	Dacia Pitești	30	13	4	13	47	40	+7	30	
8	Cimentul Fieni	30	12	6	12	37	33	+4	30	
9	Recolta Stoicănești	30	13	3	14	40	45	−5	29	
10	IPC Slatina	30	12	5	13	40	50	−10	29	
11	Progresul Corabia	30	13	2	15	44	57	−13	28	
12	IOB Balș	30	12	3	15	37	47	−10	27	
13	Petrolul Bolintin-Vale	30	11	4	15	39	49	−10	26	
14	Petrolul Târgoviște	30	11	4	15	32	63	−31	26	
15	Dinamo Alexandria (R)	30	12	1	17	42	48	−6	25	Relegation to County Championship
16	Constructorul Pitești (R)	30	7	6	17	31	58	−27	20	Relegation to County Championship

Source: romaniansoccer.ro
Rules for classification: 1) points; 2) goal difference; 3) number of goals scored.
(C) Champions; (P) Promoted; (R) Relegated

=== Seria VII ===
Pos	Team	Pld	W	D	L	GF	GA	GD	Pts	Promotion or relegation
1	Minerul Lupeni (C, P)	30	19	5	6	62	31	+31	43	Promotion to Divizia B
2	Electroputere Craiova	30	20	2	8	64	33	+31	42	
3	Dierna Orșova	30	14	8	8	55	37	+18	36	
4	Minerul Motru	30	15	3	12	65	40	+25	33	
5	Drobeta-Turnu Severin	30	13	6	11	45	37	+8	32 (Note: The match Gloria Strehaia – Drobeta-Turnu Severin (18–2), from last round, was lost by both teams with 0–3.)	
6	Constructorul TCI Craiova	30	10	9	11	44	47	−3	29	
7	Dunărea Calafat	30	11	6	13	47	38	+9	28	
8	Metalurgistul Sadu	30	12	4	14	33	47	−14	28	
9	Unirea Drobeta-Turnu Severin	30	12	4	14	32	50	−18	28	
10	Lotru Brezoi	30	12	3	15	40	42	−2	27	
11	CFR Craiova	30	11	5	14	32	44	−12	27	
12	Viitorul Drăgășani	30	10	6	14	27	39	−12	26	
13	Progresul Băilești	30	11	4	15	26	42	−16	26	
14	Metalul Rovinari	30	10	5	15	30	39	−9	25	
15	Chimistul Râmnicu Vâlcea (R)	30	8	9	13	25	42	−17	25	Relegation to County Championship
16	Gloria Strehaia (R)	30	8	7	15	34	59	−25	23	Relegation to County Championship

Source: romaniansoccer.ro
Rules for classification: 1) points; 2) goal difference; 3) number of goals scored.
(C) Champions; (P) Promoted; (R) Relegated

=== Seria VIII ===
Pos	Team	Pld	W	D	L	GF	GA	GD	Pts	Promotion or relegation
1	CFR Timișoara (C, P)	30	20	7	3	60	20	+40	47	Promotion to Divizia B
2	Minerul Deva	30	17	4	9	69	33	+36	38	
3	Vulturii Textila Lugoj	30	16	2	12	46	40	+6	34	
4	Gloria Reșița	30	15	2	13	53	53	0	32	
5	CPL Caransebeș	30	14	3	13	41	45	−4	31	
6	Minerul Oravița	30	14	2	14	44	40	+4	30	
7	Metalul Bocșa	30	14	1	15	53	54	−1	29	
8	Minerul Vulcan	30	13	3	14	38	44	−6	29	
9	Electromotor Timișoara	30	13	3	14	39	45	−6	29	
10	Victoria Călan	30	11	6	13	40	38	+2	28	
11	Minerul Ghelar	30	13	2	15	48	47	+1	28	
12	CFR Simeria	30	14	0	16	44	47	−3	28	
13	Explorări Deva	30	12	4	14	39	46	−7	28	
14	Metalul Oțelu Roșu	30	13	2	15	45	53	−8	28	
15	Laminorul Nădrag (R)	30	14	0	16	46	58	−12	28	Relegation to County Championship
16	Știința Petroșani (R)	30	4	5	21	38	80	−42	13	Relegation to County Championship

Source: romaniansoccer.ro
Rules for classification: 1) points; 2) goal difference; 3) number of goals scored.
(C) Champions; (P) Promoted; (R) Relegated

=== Seria IX ===
Pos	Team	Pld	W	D	L	GF	GA	GD	Pts	Promotion or relegation
1	Rapid Arad (C, P)	30	18	7	5	59	27	+32	43	Promotion to Divizia B
2	Armătura Zalău	30	19	2	9	45	25	+20	40 (Note: The match Bihoreana Marghita – Armătura Zalău (1–10), from last round, was lost by both teams with 0–3.)	
3	Bihoreana Marghita	30	19	0	11	59	33	+26	38	
4	CFR Arad	30	13	7	10	45	30	+15	33	
5	Construcții Electrometal Cluj-Napoca	30	14	5	11	41	36	+5	33	
6	Unirea Tomnatic	30	14	4	12	58	37	+21	32	
7	Unirea Dej	30	11	7	12	39	42	−3	29	
8	Oțelul Bihor	30	11	6	13	43	43	0	28	
9	Voința Oradea	30	13	2	15	53	54	−1	28	
10	Tricolorul Beiuș	30	12	4	14	31	39	−8	28	
11	Unirea Sânnicolau Mare	30	11	6	13	30	41	−11	28	
12	Victoria Elcond Zalău	30	11	4	15	44	54	−10	26	
13	Victoria Ineu	30	12	2	16	40	61	−21	26	
14	Recolta Salonta	30	11	3	16	31	50	−19	25	
15	Minerul Șuncuiuș (R)	30	8	6	16	31	60	−29	22	Relegation to County Championship
16	Unirea Oradea (R)	30	6	7	17	28	51	−23	19	Relegation to County Championship

Source: romaniansoccer.ro
Rules for classification: 1) points; 2) goal difference; 3) number of goals scored.
(C) Champions; (P) Promoted; (R) Relegated

=== Seria X ===
Pos	Team	Pld	W	D	L	GF	GA	GD	Pts	Promotion or relegation
1	CIL Sighetu Marmației (C, P)	30	20	3	7	94	29	+65	43	Promotion to Divizia B
2	Victoria Carei	30	19	2	9	70	30	+40	40	
3	Minerul Ilba-Seini	30	14	3	13	47	39	+8	31	
4	Minerul Rodna	30	13	4	13	40	37	+3	30	
5	Oașul Negrești-Oaș	30	14	2	14	40	45	−5	30	
6	Minerul Baia Sprie	30	14	1	15	65	59	+6	29	
7	Metalul Carei	30	11	7	12	35	39	−4	29	
8	Simared Baia Mare	30	11	6	13	49	47	+2	28	
9	Cuprom Baia Mare	30	12	4	14	55	55	0	28	
10	Minerul Băița	30	12	4	14	46	49	−3	28	
11	Minerul Băiuț	30	13	2	15	40	44	−4	28	
12	Lăpușul Târgu Lăpuș	30	12	4	14	36	51	−15	28	
13	Foresta Bistrița	30	12	4	14	41	57	−16	28	
14	Silvicultorul Maieru	30	13	2	15	36	70	−34	28	
15	Bradul Vișeu de Sus (R)	30	12	3	15	44	49	−5	27	Relegation to County Championship
16	Hebe Sângeorz-Băi (R)	30	11	3	16	36	74	−38	25	Relegation to County Championship

Source: romaniansoccer.ro
Rules for classification: 1) points; 2) goal difference; 3) number of goals scored.
(C) Champions; (P) Promoted; (R) Relegated

=== Seria XI ===
Pos	Team	Pld	W	D	L	GF	GA	GD	Pts	Promotion or relegation
1	Metalul Aiud (C, P)	30	22	2	6	89	23	+66	46	Promotion to Divizia B
2	Sticla Arieșul Turda	30	16	4	10	62	31	+31	36	
3	IMIX Agnita	30	15	5	10	40	32	+8	35	
4	Metalul Sighișoara	30	16	2	12	52	29	+23	34	
5	Automecanica Mediaș	30	13	5	12	51	39	+12	31	
6	Metalul Copșa Mică	30	12	7	11	42	46	−4	31	
7	CIL Blaj	30	13	5	12	38	45	−7	31	
8	Mureșul Luduș	30	15	0	15	50	48	+2	30	
9	CPL Sebeș	30	13	4	13	36	50	−14	30	
10	IPA Sibiu	30	13	3	14	38	33	+5	29	
11	Avântul Reghin	30	13	3	14	46	45	+1	29	
12	Oțelul Reghin	30	13	3	14	40	46	−6	29	
13	Vitrometan Mediaș	30	12	5	13	30	40	−10	29	
14	Construcții Sibiu	30	11	5	14	31	55	−24	27	
15	Sticla Târnaveni (R)	30	7	10	13	35	55	−20	24	Relegation to County Championship
16	Faianța Sighișoara (R)	30	2	5	23	20	83	−63	9	Relegation to County Championship

Source: romaniansoccer.ro
Rules for classification: 1) points; 2) goal difference; 3) number of goals scored.
(C) Champions; (P) Promoted; (R) Relegated

=== Seria XII ===
Pos	Team	Pld	W	D	L	GF	GA	GD	Pts	Promotion or relegation
1	Oltul Sfântu Gheorghe (C, P)	30	18	7	5	55	21	+34	43	Promotion to Divizia B
2	Mureșul Toplița	30	17	3	10	48	33	+15	37	
3	Progresul Odorheiu Secuiesc	30	14	8	8	54	22	+32	36	
4	Precizia Săcele	30	15	6	9	39	29	+10	36	
5	Metalul Târgu Secuiesc	30	15	3	12	39	37	+2	33	
6	Mobila Măgura Codlea	30	13	6	11	39	25	+14	32	
7	Minerul Bălan	30	13	4	13	28	39	−11	30	
8	Minerul Baraolt	30	12	4	14	36	38	−2	28	
9	Metrom Brașov	30	10	8	12	33	37	−4	28	
10	CSU Brașov	30	12	3	15	38	41	−3	27	
11	Carpați Brașov	30	11	5	14	34	37	−3	27	
12	Torpedo Zărnești	30	10	7	13	27	42	−15	27	
13	Chimia Victoria	30	11	4	15	38	44	−6	26	
14	Tractorul Miercurea Ciuc	30	8	8	14	24	32	−8	24	
15	Carpați Covasna (R)	30	9	6	15	25	57	−32	24	Relegation to County Championship
16	Utilajul Făgăraș (R)	30	10	2	18	24	47	−23	22	Relegation to County Championship

Source: romaniansoccer.ro
Rules for classification: 1) points; 2) goal difference; 3) number of goals scored.
(C) Champions; (P) Promoted; (R) Relegated

== See also ==
- 1979–80 Divizia A
- 1979–80 Divizia B
- 1979–80 County Championship
- 1979–80 Cupa României
