= Șoimii Stadium (Lipova) =

Sports venue in Lipova, Romania

Șoimii
- Interactive map of Șoimii
- Address: Str. Lt. Vasile Bugariu
- Location: Lipova, Romania
- Coordinates: 46°05′46″N 21°41′54.9″E
- Owner: Town of Lipova
- Operator: Șoimii Lipova
- Capacity: 1,520
- Surface: Grass

Construction
- Opened: 16 September 2022
- Cost: €1.2 million

Tenant
- Șoimii Lipova (2022–present)

The Șoimii Stadium is a multi-use stadium in Lipova, Romania. It is used mostly for football matches and is the home ground of Șoimii Lipova. The stadium was opened on 16 September 2022, with a third division match between Șoimii Lipova and Avântul Periam, score 5–0, thus officially replacing the old stadium, which was demolished in 2016. The new stadium has a covered main stand with a capacity of 1,520 seats and modern facilities which cost €1.2 million.
