= CS Șoimii Lipova =

Romanian football club

Șoimii Lipova
- Full name: Clubul Sportiv Șoimii Lipova
- Nicknames: Lipovanii (The People from Lipova)
- Short name: Șoimii
- Founded: 1974; 52 years ago as Șoimii Lipova; 1980; 46 years ago as Șoimii-Strungul Lipova; 2012; 14 years ago as Șoimii Lipova
- Ground: Șoimii
- Capacity: 1,520
- Owner: Lipova Town
- Chairman: Virgiliu Stamate
- League: not active at senior level
- 2023–24: Liga III, Seria VIII, 6th (withdrew)
- Website: https://soimiilipova.ro/
| Home colours | Away colours | Third colours |

Clubul Sportiv Șoimii Lipova, commonly known as CS Șoimii Lipova, or simply Șoimii Lipova, is a Romanian professional football club based in Lipova, Arad County.

The team was founded in 1974 and played in the Divizia C for 14 years, between 1980 and 1994. The most important result was a 1st place in the 11th series, achieved at the end of the 1991–92 season. After 1994 Șoimii played only in the fourth tier of the Romanian football league system and even withdrew from any competition in the spring of 2010. After two years of inactivity Șoimii enrolled in the sixth tier and started its ascension, promoting back to Liga III at the end of the 2016–17 season.

== History ==
Șoimii Lipova was founded in 1974 after a merger between Mureșul Lipova and Luptătorul Lipova. In the first season, 1974–75 Arad County Championship, the squad based in Lipova finished on the 4th place, then in the following season, 1975–76, won the county championship and qualifying for the Divizia C promotion play-off, but lost in front of Timiș County champion, Laminorul Nădrag (1–0 at Nădrag and 0–2 at Lipova). Followed three seasons in which Șoimii finished on the following positions: 4th (1976–77 and 1977–78) and 9th (1978–79) in the second series of the County Championship.

In the 1979–80 season, Șoimii Lipova won the county championship again, finished 1st in Series B and won the championship final against the winner of the Series A, Chimia Arad (1–0 at Lipova and 3–3 at Vladimirescu). Followed a promotion play-off match to Divizia C against the champion of Liga IV – Timiș County, Textila Timișoara. Șoimii promoted after two victories (3–1 at Timișoara and 2–1 at Lipova).

After the promotion, in the summer of 1980, the team starts collaborating with the lathe factory from Lipova changing its name to Șoimii-Strungul, and at the end of the first season in Divizia C, Șoimii-Strungul, with a new coach, Toma Jurcă, finished on the 4th place.

Then in the summer of 1981 changed its name again in Șoimii Lipova. Followed another 12 consecutive seasons in the Divizia C for Șoimii, which also won the 11th series of the league at the end of the 1991–92 season, but never played in the Divizia B due to some competitive reorganizations dictated by the Romanian Football Federation.

At the end of the 1993–94 season "lipovanii" relegated to Divizia D, where they remained for the next 16 years. In the spring of 2010 Șoimii withdrew from Liga IV after the biggest defeat suffered in the history of the club, 1–28 against Frontiera Curtici. In 2012, after two years of inactivity Șoimii Lipova was reestablished and enrolled in the Liga VI, last tier of the Arad County association. Șoimii obtained two consecutive promotions and in the summer of 2015 was back in the Liga IV, competition which they won at the end of the 2016–17 season. As the champion of Arad County, "lipovanii" played the promotion play-off against CS Diosig, the champions of Bihor County, which they have defeated 7–1 on aggregate and promoted back to Liga III after 23 years of absence. In the first season Șoimii finished on the 6th place in the fourth series.

== Grounds ==
=== Stadionul Orășenesc ===
The club plays its home matches on Stadionul Orășenesc from Lipova, with a capacity of 1,000 seats.

=== Stadionul Șoimii ===
From 2017, the club played its home matches on Stadionul Șoimii from Pâncota due to the modernization works carried out at the stadium in Lipova.

== Chronology of names ==
| Name | Period |
| Șoimii Lipova | 1974–1980 |
| Șoimii-Strungul Lipova | 1980–1981 |
| Șoimii Lipova | 1981–present |

== Honours ==
Liga III

- Winners (2): 1991–92, 2020–21
- Runners-up (3): 2018–19, 2019–20, 2022–23

Liga IV – Arad County

- Winners (3): 1975–76, 1979–80, 2016–17
- Runners-up (2): 1997–98, 2004–05

Liga V – Arad County

- Winners (1): 2013–14

Liga VI – Arad County

- Winners (1): 2012–13

Cupa României – Arad County

- Winners (2): 2015–16, 2016–17

== League history ==
| Season | Tier | Division | Place | Cupa României |
|---|---|---|---|---|
| 2023–24 | 3 | Liga III (Seria VIII) | 6th (R) | |
| 2022–23 | 3 | Liga III (Seria VIII) | 2nd | |
| 2021–22 | 3 | Liga III (Seria VIII) | 3rd | |
| 2020–21 | 3 | Liga III (Seria VIII) | 1st (C) | |
| 2019–20 | 3 | Liga III (Seria IV) | 2nd | |

| Season | Tier | Division | Place | Cupa României |
|---|---|---|---|---|
| 2018–19 | 3 | Liga III (Seria IV) | 2nd | |
| 2017–18 | 3 | Liga III (Seria IV) | 6th | |
| 2016–17 | 4 | Liga IV (AR) | 1st (C, P) | |
| 2015–16 | 4 | Liga IV (AR) | 6th | |
| 2014–15 | 4 | Liga IV (AR) | 3rd | |

== Former managers ==
- (Romania) Cristian Todea (2023–2024)
