= 1979–80 County Championship =

38th season of the Liga IV, the fourth tier of the Romanian football league

Liga IV
- Season: 1979–80

The 1979–80 County Championship was the 38th season of the Liga IV, the fourth tier of the Romanian football league system. The champions of each county association play against one from a neighboring county in a play-off to gain promotion to Divizia C.

== County championships ==
- Alba (AB)
- Arad (AR)
- Argeș (AG)
- Bacău (BC)
- Bihor (BH)
- Bistrița-Năsăud (BN)
- Botoșani (BT)
- Brașov (BV)
- Brăila (BR)
- Bucharest (B)
- Buzău (BZ)
- Caraș-Severin (CS)
- Cluj (CJ)
- Constanța (CT)
- Covasna (CV)
- Dâmbovița (DB)
- Dolj (DJ)
- Galați (GL)
- Gorj (GJ)
- Harghita (HR)
- Hunedoara (HD)
- Ialomița (IL)
- Iași (IS)
- Ilfov (IF)
- Maramureș (MM)
- Mehedinți (MH)
- Mureș (MS)
- Neamț (NT)
- Olt (OT)
- Prahova (PH)
- Satu Mare (SM)
- Sălaj (SJ)
- Sibiu (SB)
- Suceava (SV)
- Teleorman (TR)
- Timiș (TM)
- Tulcea (TL)
- Vaslui (VS)
- Vâlcea (VL)
- Vrancea (VN)

== Promotion play-off ==
Teams promoted to Divizia C without a play-off matches as teams from less represented counties in the third division.

- (TR) Cetatea Turnu Măgurele
- (SJ) Rapid Jibou
- (VL) Hidroenergia Râmnicu Vâlcea
- (VS) FEPA 74 Bârlad
- (TL) Viitorul Mahmudia
- (BR) Tractorul Viziru
- (MH) Mecanizatorul Șimian
- (CV) Constructorul Sfântu Gheorghe

The matches were played on 6 and 13 July 1980.

Team 1	Agg.	Team 2	1st leg	2nd leg
Olimpia Gherla (CJ)	2–3	(BN) Textila Năsăud	1–1	1–2 (a.e.t.)
Unirea Răcari (DB)	2–0	(AG) Petrolul Bascov	2–0	0–0
Constructorul Odobești (VN)	2–3	(GL) Avântul Matca	2–0	0–3
Constructorul Călărași (IL)	5–4	(IF) Petrolul Roata de Jos	5–1	0–3
Textila Cisnădie (SB)	1–2	(CS) CFR Caransebeș	1–0	0–2 (a.e.t.)
Unirea Săveni (BT)	1–4	(IS) Tepro Iași	1–0	0–4
Cimentul Hoghiz (BV)	2–3	(MS) Electrozahăr Târgu Mureș	2–1	0–2
Metalul Mangalia (CT)	8–2	(BZ) Victoria Râmnicu Sărat	5–2	3–0
Constructorul Târgu Jiu (GJ)	0–2	(HD) Minerul Paroșeni	0–0	0–2
Minerul Baia Borșa (MM)	3–2	(AB) Soda Ocna Mureș	3–0	0–2
ICIM Ploiești (PH)	7–3	(B) Granitul București	6–0	1–3
Textila Timișoara (TM)	2–5	(AR) Șoimii Lipova	1–3	1–2
Unirea Cristuru Secuiesc (HR)	4–6	(BC) Victoria IRA Bacău	4–2	0–4
Unirea Valea lui Mihai (BH)	3–2	(SM) Unio Satu Mare	1–1	2–1
Rapid Piatra-Olt (OT)	1–2	(DJ) Victoria Craiova	1–0	0–2
Unirea Siret (SV)	2–0	(NT) CPL Piatra Neamț	1–0	1–0

== Championships standings ==
=== Arad County ===
Series A

Pos	Team	Pld	W	D	L	GF	GA	GD	Pts	Qualification or relegation
1	Chimia Arad (Q)	30	24	2	4	86	22	+64	50	Qualification to championship final
2	Luptătorul Lipova	30	22	2	6	72	32	+40	46	
3	Șoimii Pâncota	30	18	3	9	66	30	+36	39	
4	Frontiera Curtici	30	13	7	10	61	40	+21	33	
5	Gloria Ineu	30	13	7	10	48	28	+20	33	
6	Progresul Pecica	30	13	7	10	43	47	−4	33	
7	Viitorul Turnu	30	13	6	11	51	37	+14	32	
8	Înfrățirea Iratoșu	30	14	3	13	49	54	−5	31	
9	Stăruința Dorobanți	30	12	6	12	45	49	−4	30	
10	CPL Arad	30	9	11	10	35	44	−9	29	
11	Șiriana Șiria	30	11	5	14	44	47	−3	27	
12	Voința Macea	30	11	5	14	31	44	−13	27	
13	Indagrara Arad	30	11	3	16	34	38	−4	25	
14	Crișul Buteni	30	10	4	16	43	71	−28	24	
15	Tricoul Roșu Arad	30	3	5	22	29	72	−43	11	
16	CFR Gurahonț	30	3	4	23	17	99	−82	10	

Rules for classification: 1) Points; 2) Goal difference; 3) Number of goals scored.
(Q) Qualified for the phase indicated

Series B

Pos	Team	Pld	W	D	L	GF	GA	GD	Pts	Qualification or relegation
1	Șoimii Lipova (Q)	30	20	6	4	79	22	+57	46	Qualification to championship final
2	Mureșul Zădăreni	30	18	3	9	38	39	−1	39	
3	Strungul Chișineu-Criș	30	17	4	9	87	43	+44	38	
4	Gloria Arad	29	17	4	8	71	35	+36	38	
5	Unirea Șofronea	30	18	0	12	75	61	+14	36	
6	Motorul Arad	30	13	9	8	51	29	+22	35	
7	Dacia Beliu	29	14	5	10	61	49	+12	33	
8	Unirea Șeitin	30	14	4	12	53	42	+11	32	
9	Fulgerul Arad	30	13	5	12	71	59	+12	31	
10	Crișana Sebiș	30	10	6	14	39	52	−13	26	
11	Unirea Aluniș	30	12	2	16	37	63	−26	26	
12	Victoria Zăbrani	30	11	3	16	42	39	+3	25	
13	FZ Arad	30	10	4	16	32	61	−29	24	
14	Titanus Arad	30	8	7	15	43	79	−36	23	
15	Unirea Sântana	30	8	4	18	39	69	−30	20	
16	Flacăra Moneasa	30	2	2	26	25	101	−76	6	

Rules for classification: 1) Points; 2) Goal difference; 3) Number of goals scored.
(Q) Qualified for the phase indicated

Championship final

The matches were played on 4 and 8 June 1980.

Team 1	Agg.	Team 2	1st leg	2nd leg
Șoimii Lipova	4–3	Chimia Arad	1–0	3–3

Șoimii Lipova won the Arad County Championship and qualify for promotion play-off in Divizia C.

=== Botoșani County ===
Series I

Pos	Team	Pld	W	D	L	GF	GA	GD	Pts	Qualification or relegation
1	Electro Botoșani (Q)	22	18	1	3	94	24	+70	37	Qualification to championship play-off
2	Progresul Botoșani (Q)	22	17	2	3	69	26	+43	36	Qualification to championship play-off
3	Flacăra Flămânzi	22	12	1	9	58	42	+16	25	
4	Voința Costești	22	12	1	9	51	39	+12	25	
5	Avântul Mihai Eminescu	22	12	1	9	56	42	+14	25	
6	Intex Botoșani	22	11	1	10	50	47	+3	23	
7	Înainte Copălău	22	11	0	11	43	56	−13	22	
8	Zorile Roma	22	9	3	10	45	54	−9	21	
9	Recolta Corni	22	9	1	12	37	42	−5	19	
10	Progresul Nicșeni	22	6	1	15	26	60	−34	13	
11	Voința Mândrești	22	4	3	15	31	58	−27	11	
12	Recolta Leorda (Note: Recolta Leorda was excluded after the 13th round.)	22	3	1	18	16	86	−70	7	

Rules for classification: 1) Points; 2) Goal difference; 3) Number of goals scored.
(Q) Qualified for the phase indicated
Notes:

Series II

Pos	Team	Pld	W	D	L	GF	GA	GD	Pts	Qualification or relegation
1	Unirea Săveni (Q)	22	15	1	6	72	21	+51	31	Qualification to championship play-off
2	Gloria Todireni (Q)	22	14	1	7	62	38	+24	29	Qualification to championship play-off
3	Avîntul Albești	22	12	2	8	60	30	+30	26	
4	Zorile Havârna	22	12	1	9	51	50	+1	25	
5	Rapid Ungureni	22	11	2	9	42	46	−4	24	
6	Prutul Mitoc	22	9	2	11	39	42	−3	20	
7	Spicul Iacobeni	22	10	0	12	44	61	−17	20	
8	Sănătatea Darabani	22	9	1	12	36	33	+3	19	
9	Recolta Hlipiceni	22	9	1	12	40	53	−13	19	
10	Munca Drăgușeni	22	8	3	11	35	50	−15	19	
11	Spicul Avrămeni	22	8	2	12	38	64	−26	18	
12	Scânteia Liveni	22	6	2	14	40	71	−31	14	

Rules for classification: 1) Points; 2) Goal difference; 3) Number of goals scored.
(Q) Qualified for the phase indicated

Championship play-off

Pos	Team	Pld	W	D	L	GF	GA	GD	Pts	Qualification
1	Unirea Săveni (C, Q)	3	2	0	1	13	5	+8	4	Qualification to promotion play-off
2	Progresul Botoșani	3	2	0	1	8	5	+3	4	
3	Electro Botoșani	3	2	0	1	4	1	+3	4	
4	Gloria Todireni	3	0	0	3	2	16	−14	0	

Rules for classification: 1) Points; 2) Goal difference; 3) Number of goals scored.
(C) Champions; (Q) Qualified for the phase indicated

Electro Botoșani	0–1	Unirea Săveni

Progresul Botoșani	5–0	Gloria Todireni

Electro Botoșani	1–0	Gloria Todireni

Progresul Botoșani	3–2	Unirea Săveni

Electro Botoșani	3–0	Progresul Botoșani

Unirea Săveni	10–2	Gloria Todireni

=== Caraș-Severin County ===
Pos	Team	Pld	W	D	L	GF	GA	GD	Pts	Qualification or relegation
1	CFR Caransebeș (C, Q)	34	25	6	3	112	31	+81	56	Qualification to promotion play-off
2	Nera Bozovici	34	22	4	8	95	36	+59	48	
3	Energia Reșița	34	18	4	12	76	42	+34	40	
4	Mecanica Reșița	34	17	4	13	81	48	+33	38	
5	Progresul Băile Herculane	34	17	4	13	55	46	+9	38	
6	Siderurgistul Reșița	34	16	2	16	71	60	+11	34	
7	Dunărea Belobreșca	34	15	4	15	66	71	−5	34	
8	ICM Caransebeș	34	13	6	15	68	67	+1	32	
9	Muncitorul Reșița	34	15	2	17	60	72	−12	32	
10	CFR Oravița	34	13	6	15	72	90	−18	32	
11	Foresta Zăvoi	34	15	2	17	70	93	−23	32	
12	Minerul Eftimie Murgu	34	15	2	17	56	84	−28	32	
13	Bistra Glimboca	34	13	5	16	66	76	−10	31	
14	Autoforesta Bocșa	34	14	2	18	51	55	−4	30	
15	Minerul Ocna de Fier	34	11	8	15	45	59	−14	30	
16	Victoria Caransebeș	34	11	6	17	50	71	−21	28	
17	ATA Oravița	34	10	5	19	50	84	−34	25	
18	FCM II Diesel	34	8	4	22	50	109	−59	20	

Rules for classification: 1) Points; 2) Goal difference; 3) Number of goals scored.
(C) Champions; (Q) Qualified for the phase indicated

=== Covasna County ===
Championship final

The matches were played on 1 and 7 June 1980.

Team 1	Agg.	Team 2	1st leg	2nd leg
Metalul Sfântu Gheorghe	2–3	Constructorul Sfântu Gheorghe	0–2	2–1

Constructorul Sfântu Gheorghe won the Covasna County Championship and qualify for promotion play-off in Divizia C.

=== Harghita County ===
Series I

Pos	Team	Pld	W	D	L	GF	GA	GD	Pts	Qualification or relegation
1	Mobila Ditrău (Q)	18	14	1	3	51	16	+35	29	Qualification to championship final
2	Complexul Gălăuțaș	18	14	0	4	53	21	+32	28	
3	Mureșul Suseni	18	10	3	5	54	36	+18	23	
4	Făgetul Borsec	18	9	1	8	46	46	0	19	
5	Unirea Hodoșa	18	8	2	8	28	34	−6	18	
6	Unirea Tulgheș	18	8	1	9	32	34	−2	17	
7	ITA Harghita Cârța	18	6	3	9	39	32	+7	15	
8	Bastionul Lăzarea	18	7	1	10	18	28	−10	15	
9	Viață Nouă Remetea	18	4	2	12	22	55	−33	10	

Rules for classification: 1) Points; 2) Goal difference; 3) Number of goals scored.
(Q) Qualified for the phase indicated

Series II

Pos	Team	Pld	W	D	L	GF	GA	GD	Pts	Qualification or relegation
1	Unirea Cristuru Secuiesc (Q)	18	15	1	2	65	7	+58	31	Qualification to championship final
2	Flamura Roșie Sânsimion	18	13	4	1	46	17	+29	30	
3	Metalul Vlăhița	18	12	1	5	51	21	+30	25	
4	Avântul Miercurea Ciuc	18	7	3	8	32	37	−5	17	
5	Șoimii Băile Tușnad	18	8	0	10	30	38	−8	16	
6	Olimpia Miercurea Ciuc	18	6	2	10	31	38	−7	14	
7	Minerul Lueta	18	6	2	10	27	34	−7	14	
8	Progresul Odorheiu Secuiesc II	18	4	5	9	20	35	−15	13	
9	Rapid Porumbenii Mari	18	4	2	12	22	49	−27	10	
10	Avântul Lunca de Jos	18	4	1	13	29	77	−48	9	

Rules for classification: 1) Points; 2) Goal difference; 3) Number of goals scored.
(Q) Qualified for the phase indicated

Championship final

The matches were played on 8 and 15 June 1980.

Team 1	Agg.	Team 2	1st leg	2nd leg
Unirea Cristuru Secuiesc	7–3	Mobila Ditrău	4–2	3–1

Unirea Cristuru Secuiesc won the Harghita County Championship and qualify for promotion play-off in Divizia C.

=== Hunedoara County ===
Pos	Team	Pld	W	D	L	GF	GA	GD	Pts	Qualification or relegation
1	Minerul Paroșeni (C, Q)	28	21	2	5	103	33	+70	44	Qualification to promotion play-off
2	Aurul Certej	28	18	6	4	103	31	+72	42	
3	Metalul Hunedoara	28	16	4	8	61	30	+31	36	
4	Minerul Aninoasa	28	16	4	8	62	44	+18	36	
5	Constructorul Hunedoara	28	16	2	10	59	39	+20	34	
6	Minerul Uricani	28	15	2	11	73	49	+24	32	
7	IMC Bârcea	28	14	1	13	53	53	0	29	
8	Preparatorul Petrila	28	12	4	12	68	63	+5	28	
9	Parângul Lonea	28	11	6	11	39	39	0	28	
10	Avântul Hațeg	28	8	8	12	49	51	−2	24	
11	Metalul Simeria	28	11	1	16	65	77	−12	23	
12	IGCL Hunedoara	28	9	4	15	53	76	−23	22	
13	SGCL Călan	28	8	5	15	46	78	−32	21	
14	IGCL Petroșani	28	7	3	18	32	89	−57	17	
15	CFR Petroșani	28	1	2	25	29	143	−114	4	

Rules for classification: 1) Points; 2) Goal difference; 3) Number of goals scored.
(C) Champions; (Q) Qualified for the phase indicated

=== Maramureș County ===
Pos	Team	Pld	W	D	L	GF	GA	GD	Pts	Qualification or relegation
1	Minerul Baia Borșa (C, Q)	24	22	0	2	105	22	+83	44	Qualification to promotion play-off
2	IS Sighetu Marmației	24	15	1	8	72	39	+33	31	
3	Maramureșana Sighetu Marmației	24	14	3	7	57	28	+29	31	
4	Metalul Bogdan Vodă	24	12	3	9	69	51	+18	27	
5	Voința Târgu Lăpuș	24	11	5	8	52	42	+10	27	
6	Electrica Baia Mare	24	11	4	9	53	59	−6	26	
7	Iza Dragomirești	24	10	4	10	54	42	+12	24	
8	Olimpia Baia Mare	24	11	2	11	62	55	+7	24	
9	Tractorul Satulung	24	9	4	11	51	40	+11	22	
10	Forestiera Câmpulung la Tisa	24	9	1	14	36	68	−32	19	
11	Minerul Valea Chioarului	24	7	4	13	48	68	−20	18	
12	Paltinul Vadu Izei	24	5	0	19	35	93	−58	10	
13	IPP Coștiui	24	4	1	19	16	103	−87	9	
14	Gloria Baia Mare (Note: Gloria Baia Mare withdrew before the start of the season.) (D)	0	0	0	0	0	0	0	0	Withdrew

Rules for classification: 1) Points; 2) Goal difference; 3) Number of goals scored.
(C) Champions; (D) Disqualified; (Q) Qualified for the phase indicated

=== Mureș County ===
Pos	Team	Pld	W	D	L	GF	GA	GD	Pts	Qualification or relegation
1	Electrozahăr Târgu Mureș (C, Q)	30	24	3	3	82	19	+63	51	Qualification to promotion play-off
2	Metalotehnica Târgu Mureș	30	22	7	1	67	10	+57	51	
3	IRA Târgu Mureș	30	16	7	7	60	24	+36	39	
4	Metalul Reghin	30	13	5	12	36	32	+4	31	
5	Lacul Ursu Sovata	30	12	5	13	39	42	−3	29	
6	Autobuzul Târnăveni	30	11	7	12	33	37	−4	29	
7	Voința Sângeorgiu de Pădure	30	12	3	15	35	46	−11	27	
8	Voința Sărmașu	30	11	4	15	47	46	+1	26	
9	Energia Iernut	30	10	6	14	33	35	−2	26	
10	Voința Miercurea Nirajului	30	11	4	15	36	48	−12	26	
11	Recolta Vidrasău	30	10	6	14	37	57	−20	26	
12	Mureșul Reghin	30	11	3	16	39	55	−16	25	
13	Zahărul Luduș	30	12	1	17	35	75	−40	25	
14	Viitorul Aluniș	30	8	8	14	42	56	−14	24	
15	Viitorul Târgu Mureș	30	9	5	16	42	58	−16	23	
16	Lemnarul Târgu Mureș	30	9	4	17	26	49	−23	22	

Rules for classification: 1) Points; 2) Goal difference; 3) Number of goals scored.
(C) Champions; (Q) Qualified for the phase indicated

=== Prahova County ===
Pos	Team	Pld	W	D	L	GF	GA	GD	Pts	Qualification or relegation
1	ICIM Ploiești (C, Q)	34	23	7	4	66	24	+42	53	Qualification to promotion play-off
2	Electromotor Câmpina	34	20	7	7	72	41	+31	47	
3	Minerul Filipeștii de Pădure	34	19	8	7	66	30	+36	46	
4	Victoria Florești	34	19	5	10	59	32	+27	43	
5	Tricolorul Breaza	34	16	10	8	57	30	+27	42	
6	Rapid Mizil	34	18	5	11	52	44	+8	41	
7	Petrolistul Boldești	34	15	8	11	50	36	+14	38	
8	Metalul Filipeștii de Pădure	34	12	10	12	41	48	−7	34	
9	IRA Câmpina	34	14	5	15	55	41	+14	33	
10	Avântul Măneciu	34	13	6	15	41	48	−7	32	
11	Unirea Teleajen Ploiești	34	11	10	13	37	48	−11	32	
12	Geamul Scăeni	34	13	5	16	45	56	−11	31	
13	Chimistul Valea Călugărească	34	11	8	15	51	57	−6	30	
14	Viitorul Slănic	34	11	6	17	42	58	−16	28	
15	IUC Ploiești	34	12	3	19	39	56	−17	27	
16	PECO Ploiești	34	8	6	20	29	51	−22	22	
17	Feroemail Ploiești (Note: Feroemail Ploiești was spared from relegation due to the promotion of ICIM Ploiești in Divizia C.)	34	8	5	21	32	84	−52	21	Spared from relegation
18	Petrolul Teleajen Ploiești (R)	34	2	8	24	27	77	−50	12	Relegation to Prahova County Championship II

Rules for classification: 1) Points; 2) Goal difference; 3) Number of goals scored.
(C) Champions; (Q) Qualified for the phase indicated; (R) Relegated

=== Sălaj County ===
Pos	Team	Pld	W	D	L	GF	GA	GD	Pts	Qualification or relegation
1	Rapid Jibou (C, Q)	26	19	4	3	89	18	+71	42	Qualification to promotion play-off
2	Spartac Crasna	26	17	1	8	55	26	+29	35	
3	Minerul Sărmășag	26	15	5	6	55	29	+26	35	
4	Recolta Agrij	26	13	2	11	56	40	+16	28	
5	Progresul Bălan	26	11	6	9	60	69	−9	28	
6	Energia Sânmihaiu Almașului	26	11	5	10	48	43	+5	27	
7	Minerul Surduc	26	11	5	10	40	45	−5	27	
8	Voința Derșida	26	10	5	11	46	54	−8	25	
9	Victoria Românași	26	8	9	9	42	62	−20	25	
10	Izolatorul Șimleu Silvaniei	26	9	5	12	34	54	−20	23	
11	Silvania Cehu Silvaniei	26	7	5	14	53	45	+8	19	
12	Minerul Letca	26	8	3	15	47	65	−18	19	
13	Laminorul Zalău	26	7	5	14	26	52	−26	19	
14	Olimpic Bocșa	26	3	6	17	24	73	−49	12	

Rules for classification: 1) Points; 2) Goal difference; 3) Number of goals scored.
(C) Champions; (Q) Qualified for the phase indicated

=== Sibiu County ===
Pos	Team	Pld	W	D	L	GF	GA	GD	Pts	Qualification or relegation
1	Textila Cisnădie (C, Q)	30	22	5	3	89	25	+64	49	Qualification to promotion play-off
2	Metalul IO Sibiu	30	22	5	3	62	21	+41	49	
3	CSU Sibiu	30	20	4	6	70	33	+37	44	
4	Inter Sibiu	30	18	4	8	71	23	+48	40	
5	Unirea Ocna Sibiului	30	14	5	11	48	33	+15	33	
6	Sparta Mediaș	30	10	9	11	42	39	+3	29	
7	Șantierul Sibiu	30	11	6	13	44	43	+1	28	
8	Progresul Dumbrăveni	30	12	4	14	44	51	−7	28	
9	Record Mediaș	30	12	4	14	41	51	−10	28	
10	Mecanica Sibiu	30	10	6	14	42	38	+4	26	
11	Carbosin Copșa Mică	30	11	4	15	36	42	−6	26	
12	Ogorul Nocrich	30	10	6	14	36	73	−37	26	
13	CFR Sibiu	30	8	8	14	36	47	−11	24	
14	Textila Mediaș	30	10	4	16	32	47	−15	24	
15	Spicul Șeica	30	7	3	20	22	74	−52	17	
16	Sticla Avrig	30	2	5	23	16	92	−76	9	

Rules for classification: 1) Points; 2) Goal difference; 3) Number of goals scored.
(C) Champions; (Q) Qualified for the phase indicated

=== Suceava County ===
Pos	Team	Pld	W	D	L	GF	GA	GD	Pts	Qualification or relegation
1	Unirea Siret (C, Q)	34	25	4	5	111	25	+86	54	Qualification to promotion play-off
2	Fuiorul Cornu Luncii	34	23	5	6	95	35	+60	51	
3	Șoimii Bucovinei Calafindești	34	18	5	11	72	54	+18	41	
4	Siretul Dolhasca	34	20	1	13	84	67	+17	41	
5	Avântul Todirești	34	16	7	11	91	70	+21	39	
6	Avântul Gălănești	34	16	6	12	70	47	+23	38	
7	CFR Suceava	34	16	4	14	74	61	+13	36	
8	Bistrița Broșteni	34	16	4	14	67	57	+10	36	
9	Foresta Moldovița	34	15	3	16	78	74	+4	33	
10	Viitorul Câmpulung Moldovenesc	34	13	4	17	55	64	−9	30	
11	Constructorul Dârmănești	34	13	4	17	59	79	−20	30	
12	Minerul Vatra Dornei	34	13	3	18	70	89	−19	29	
13	Locomotiva Dornești	34	13	2	19	54	86	−32	28	
14	Bradul Vama	34	12	4	18	56	87	−31	28	
15	Viitorul Verești	34	12	4	18	68	103	−35	28	
16	Viitorul Lunca Arbore	34	12	3	19	56	88	−32	27	
17	Recolta Bosanci	34	9	3	22	56	95	−39	21	
18	Voința Bunești (D)	34	10	1	23	42	82	−40	21	Excluded

Rules for classification: 1) Points; 2) Goal difference; 3) Number of goals scored.
(C) Champions; (D) Disqualified; (Q) Qualified for the phase indicated

=== Vâlcea County ===
Pos	Team	Pld	W	D	L	GF	GA	GD	Pts	Qualification or relegation
1	Hidroenergia Râmnicu Vâlcea (C, Q)	28	23	4	1	123	21	+102	50	Qualification to promotion play-off
2	Flacăra Horezu	28	21	3	4	70	22	+48	45	
3	Forestierul Băbeni	28	21	3	4	70	26	+44	45	
4	Cauciucul Drăgășani	28	14	4	10	68	45	+23	32	
5	Oltul Râmnicu Vâlcea	28	14	4	10	63	44	+19	32	
6	Cozia Călimănești	28	11	6	11	44	48	−4	28	
7	Victoria Lungești	28	13	2	13	59	86	−27	28	
8	Râureni	28	11	5	12	50	45	+5	27	
9	Oltețul Bălcești	28	12	2	14	59	59	0	26	
10	Sănătatea Govora	28	9	5	14	50	58	−8	23	
11	Spicul Sutești	28	10	3	15	48	69	−21	23	
12	Recolta Stoenești	28	11	0	17	47	67	−20	22	
13	Recolta Mihăești	28	7	3	18	50	72	−22	17	
14	Recolta Laloșu	28	7	3	18	31	64	−33	17	
15	Constructorul Râmnicu Vâlcea	28	1	0	27	9	98	−89	2	

Rules for classification: 1) Points; 2) Goal difference; 3) Number of goals scored.
(C) Champions; (Q) Qualified for the phase indicated

== See also ==
- 1979–80 Divizia A
- 1979–80 Divizia B
- 1979–80 Divizia C
- 1979–80 Cupa României
