= 1978–79 County Championship =

37th season of the Liga IV, the fourth tier of the Romanian football league

Liga IV
- Season: 1978–79

The 1978–79 County Championship was the 37th season of the Liga IV, the fourth tier of the Romanian football league system. The champions of each county association play against one from a neighboring county in a play-off to gain promotion to Divizia C.

== Promotion play-off ==
Teams promoted to Divizia C without a play-off matches as teams from less represented counties in the third division.

- (AB) CPL Sebeș
- (SJ) Victoria Elcond Zalău
- (SM) Metalul Carei
- (IL) Rapid Fetești
- (TL) Progresul Isaccea
- (BR) Șantierul Naval Brăila
- (MH) Unirea Drobeta-Turnu Severin
- (CV) Carpați OJT Covasna

The matches was played on 8 and 15 July 1979.

Team 1	Agg.	Team 2	1st leg	2nd leg
Gloria Ineu (AR)	2–7	(HD) Explorări Deva	2–0	0–7
Gloria Berevoești (AG)	5–5	(SB) Vitrometan Mediaș	4–0	1–5 (Note: The match was interrupted in the 88th minute. Gloria Berevoești left the field when the referee awarded a penalty kick to the home team, and the FRF commission set that the promoted team should be Vitrometan Mediaș.)
Rapid Panciu (VN)	2–8	(BC) Textila Buhuși	1–6	1–2
Alumina Oradea (BH)	5–1	(TM) Textila Timișoara	5–0	0–1
Faianța Sighișoara (MS)	5–0	(BN) Vișinul Șieu-Măgheruș	4–0	1–0
Electro Botoșani (BT)	3–3 (Note: Celuloza Piatra Neamț won on the away goals rule.)	(NT) Celuloza Piatra Neamț	3–2	0–1
Petrolul Târgoviște (DB)	1–1 (Note: Petrolul Târgoviște won on the away goals rule.)	(BV) Textila Prejmer	0–0	1–1
Recolta Săhăteni (BZ)	6–4	(GL) Recolta Tudor Vladimirescu	5–2	1–2
Petrolul Țicleni (GJ)	1–5	(CS) CPL Caransebeș	1–1	0–4
Simared Baia Mare (MM)	2–2 (Note: Simared Baia Mare won on the away goals rule.)	(CJ) CFR Turda	1–0	1–2
Minerul Medgidia (CT)	3–5	(B) Danubiana București	2–3	1–2
Dunărea Calafat (DJ)	3–1	(VL) Oltul Râmnicu Vâlcea	3–0	0–1
Mureșul Toplița (HR)	4–1	(SV) Unirea Siret	1–0	3–1
Viitorul Chirnogi (IF)	3–2	(PH) Victoria Florești	3–1	0–1
Electrodul Slatina (OT)	3–2	(TR) Textila Roșiori	3–1	0–1
ASA Iași (IS)	w/o (Note: FEPA 74 Bârlad was excluded by the FRF for irregularities in championship.)	(VS) FEPA 74 Bârlad	w/o	w/o

== County leagues ==
- Alba (AB)
- Arad (AR)
- Argeș (AG)
- Bacău (BC)
- Bihor (BH)
- Bistrița-Năsăud (BN)
- Botoșani (BT)
- Brașov (BV)
- Brăila (BR)
- Bucharest (B)
- Buzău (BZ)
- Caraș-Severin (CS)
- Cluj (CJ)
- Constanța (CT)
- Covasna (CV)
- Dâmbovița (DB)
- Dolj (DJ)
- Galați (GL)
- Gorj (GJ)
- Harghita (HR)
- Hunedoara (HD)
- Ialomița (IL)
- Iași (IS)
- Ilfov (IF)
- Maramureș (MM)
- Mehedinți (MH)
- Mureș (MS)
- Neamț (NT)
- Olt (OT)
- Prahova (PH)
- Satu Mare (SM)
- Sălaj (SJ)
- Sibiu (SB)
- Suceava (SV)
- Teleorman (TR)
- Timiș (TM)
- Tulcea (TL)
- Vaslui (VS)
- Vâlcea (VL)
- Vrancea (VN)

=== Arad County ===
Seria I

Pos	Team	Pld	W	D	L	GF	GA	GD	Pts	Qualification or relegation
1	Gloria Ineu (Q)	30	20	5	5	82	24	+58	45	Qualification to championship final
2	Șoimii Pâncota	30	19	5	6	62	26	+36	43	
3	Chimia Arad	29	16	6	7	69	27	+42	38	
4	Indagrara Arad	30	14	8	8	72	36	+36	36	
5	CPL Arad	30	15	3	12	45	35	+10	33	
6	Voința Macea	29	12	8	9	47	38	+9	32	
7	Progresul Pecica	29	14	3	12	49	33	+16	31	
8	Frontiera Curtici	30	13	5	12	66	57	+9	31	
9	Înfrățirea Iratoșu	30	13	4	13	50	60	−10	30	
10	Șiriana Șiria	30	10	9	11	43	59	−16	29	
11	Stăruința Dorobanți	30	10	6	14	40	60	−20	26	
12	Dacia Beliu	29	12	2	15	52	59	−7	26	
13	Viitorul Turnu	30	10	4	16	49	78	−29	24	
14	Mureșul Arad	30	9	2	19	25	57	−32	20	
15	Tricoul Roșu Arad	30	4	9	17	23	63	−40	17	
16	Agronomia Sânpaul	30	6	3	21	33	96	−63	15	

Rules for classification: 1) Points; 2) Goal difference; 3) Number of goals scored.
(Q) Qualified for the phase indicated

Seria II

Pos	Team	Pld	W	D	L	GF	GA	GD	Pts	Qualification or relegation
1	FZ Arad (Q)	28	19	5	4	66	29	+37	43	Qualification to championship final
2	Strungul Chișineu-Criș	28	19	4	5	79	26	+53	42	
3	Gloria Arad	28	16	4	8	68	30	+38	36	
4	Crișana Sebiș	28	15	4	9	56	36	+20	34	
5	Mureșul Zădăreni	28	14	2	12	72	48	+24	30	
6	Motorul Arad	28	12	6	10	50	43	+7	30	
7	Unirea Sântana	28	13	3	12	43	53	−10	29	
8	Fulgerul Arad	28	10	8	10	44	39	+5	28	
9	Șoimii Lipova	28	12	4	12	47	45	+2	28	
10	Unirea Șofronea	28	12	0	16	82	92	−10	24	
11	CFR Gurahonț	28	10	2	16	47	74	−27	22	
12	Victoria Zăbrani	28	8	5	15	44	67	−23	21	
13	Unirea Aluniș	28	7	4	17	40	59	−19	18	
14	Flacăra Moneasa	28	7	4	17	51	101	−50	18	
15	Voința Mailat	28	6	5	17	40	87	−47	17	
16	Libertatea Arad (D)	0	0	0	0	0	0	0	0 (Note: Libertatea Arad withdrew in the first part of the season and all its results were canceled.)	Withdrew

Rules for classification: 1) Points; 2) Goal difference; 3) Number of goals scored.
(D) Disqualified; (Q) Qualified for the phase indicated
Notes:

Championship final

The matches was played on 10 and 17 June 1979.

Team 1	Agg.	Team 2	1st leg	2nd leg
Gloria Ineu	9–2	FZ Arad	5–0	4–2

Gloria Ineu won the 1978–79 Arad County Championship and qualify for promotion play-off in Divizia C.

=== Caraș-Severin County ===
Pos	Team	Pld	W	D	L	GF	GA	GD	Pts	Qualification or relegation
1	CPL Caransebeș (C, Q)	32	23	6	3	75	28	+47	52	Qualification to promotion play-off
2	CFR Caransebeș	33	19	5	9	78	34	+44	43	
3	Energia Reșița	33	20	2	11	87	38	+49	42	
4	Victoria Caransebeș	32	17	5	10	65	28	+37	39	
5	Nera Bozovici	33	18	1	14	72	47	+25	37	
6	Siderurgistul Reșița	32	14	6	12	60	53	+7	34	
7	Autoforesta Bocșa	33	15	4	14	53	58	−5	34	
8	Minerul Ocna de Fier	33	15	3	15	61	73	−12	33	
9	Progresul Băile Herculane	33	14	4	15	58	52	+6	32	
10	Foresta Zăvoi	33	15	2	16	59	71	−12	32	
11	Electromecanica Reșița	33	12	6	15	61	63	−2	30	
12	Muncitorul Reșița	33	14	2	17	49	55	−6	30	
13	CFR Oravița	33	14	1	18	67	65	+2	29	
14	Progresul Reșița	33	13	3	17	48	71	−23	29	
15	Diesel Reșița	33	13	2	18	46	69	−23	28	
16	Autometalul Caransebeș	33	13	2	18	40	70	−30	28	
17	Bistra Glimboca	32	11	2	19	42	68	−26	24	

Rules for classification: 1) Points; 2) Goal difference; 3) Number of goals scored.
(C) Champions; (Q) Qualified for the phase indicated

=== Harghita County ===
Series I

Pos	Team	Pld	W	D	L	GF	GA	GD	Pts	Qualification or relegation
1	Mureșul Toplița (Q)	19	15	4	0	67	6	+61	34	Qualification to championship final
2	Mobila Ditrău	20	12	3	5	36	29	+7	27	
3	Complexul Gălăuțaș	20	10	4	6	43	21	+22	24	
4	Unirea Hodoșa	21	10	4	7	47	30	+17	24	
5	Bastionul Lăzarea	20	9	4	7	30	22	+8	22	
6	Viață Nouă Remetea	20	9	3	8	42	42	0	21	
7	Mureșul Suseni	19	8	4	7	34	44	−10	20	
8	Unirea Tulgheș	19	8	4	7	44	41	+3	20	
9	Tricotop Toplița	20	8	1	11	34	36	−2	17	
10	Metalul Gheorgheni	20	5	5	10	35	32	+3	15	
11	Făgetul Borsec	20	4	2	14	26	54	−28	10	
12	Bucin Joseni	18	0	2	16	10	91	−81	2	

Rules for classification: 1) Points; 2) Goal difference; 3) Number of goals scored.
(Q) Qualified for the phase indicated

Series II

Pos	Team	Pld	W	D	L	GF	GA	GD	Pts	Qualification or relegation
1	Unirea Cristuru Secuiesc (Q)	20	16	4	0	68	14	+54	36	Qualification to championship final
2	ASM Odorheiu Secuiesc	20	16	1	3	80	17	+63	33	
3	Metalul Vlăhița	19	12	2	5	52	19	+33	26	
4	Flamura Roșie Sânsimion	20	12	2	6	43	23	+20	26	
5	Olimpia Miercurea Ciuc	19	9	3	7	47	28	+19	21	
6	Rapid Porumbenii Mari	19	8	4	7	43	38	+5	20	
7	Minerul Lueta	19	8	4	7	32	34	−2	20	
8	Avântul Miercurea Ciuc	20	7	4	9	40	32	+8	18	
9	Textila Miercurea Ciuc	20	7	1	12	48	44	+4	15	
10	IPL Miercurea Ciuc	19	4	1	14	31	78	−47	9	
11	Șoimii IPL Băile Tușnad	20	4	1	15	26	96	−70	9	
12	IJGCL Miercurea Ciuc	19	0	1	18	8	95	−87	1	

Rules for classification: 1) Points; 2) Goal difference; 3) Number of goals scored.
(Q) Qualified for the phase indicated

Championship final

The matches was played on 17 and 24 June 1979.

Team 1	Agg.	Team 2	1st leg	2nd leg
Unirea Cristuru Secuiesc	2–3	Mureșul Toplița	1–2	1–1

Mureșul Toplița won the 1978–79 Harghita County Championship and qualify for promotion play-off in Divizia C.

=== Hunedoara County ===
Pos	Team	Pld	W	D	L	GF	GA	GD	Pts	Qualification or relegation
1	Explorări Deva (C, Q)	30	21	3	6	84	27	+57	45	Qualification to promotion play-off
2	Minerul Paroșeni	30	20	3	7	82	35	+47	43	
3	Constructorul Hunedoara	30	16	7	7	71	27	+44	39	
4	Minerul Uricani	30	15	7	8	58	43	+15	37	
5	Aurul Certej	30	15	6	9	60	49	+11	36	
6	Minerul Aninoasa	30	14	5	11	66	46	+20	33	
7	Dacia Orăștie II	30	15	1	14	48	39	+9	31	
8	IMC Bârcea	30	13	4	13	70	61	+9	30	
9	Preparatorul Petrila	30	12	5	13	54	66	−12	29	
10	CFR Petroșani	30	10	4	16	55	71	−16	24	
11	Auto Hațeg	30	11	6	13	45	52	−7	24 (Note: Auto Hațeg, IGCL Hunedoara and Parângul Lonea were deducted four points.)	
12	IGCL Hunedoara	30	12	3	15	42	68	−26	23	
13	Parângul Lonea	30	10	6	14	40	46	−6	22	
14	Metalul Simeria	30	9	4	17	36	69	−33	22	
15	Preparatorul Teliuc	30	8	3	19	39	97	−58	19	
16	Metalul Crișcior	30	4	1	25	13	73	−60	9	

Rules for classification: 1) Points; 2) Goal difference; 3) Number of goals scored.
(C) Champions; (Q) Qualified for the phase indicated

=== Maramureș County ===
Pos	Team	Pld	W	D	L	GF	GA	GD	Pts	Qualification or relegation
1	Simared Baia Mare (C, Q)	28	23	4	1	127	10	+117	50	Qualification to promotion play-off
2	Gloria Baia Mare	28	22	2	4	87	14	+73	46	
3	Minerul Baia Borșa	28	18	3	7	80	14	+66	39	
4	Tractorul Satulung	28	14	2	12	52	60	−8	30	
5	Iza Dragomirești	28	14	1	13	81	56	+25	29	
6	Olimpia Baia Mare	28	14	1	13	61	55	+6	29	
7	IS Sighetu Marmației	28	12	4	12	52	51	+1	28	
8	Maramureșana Sighetu Marmației	28	13	2	13	50	54	−4	28	
9	Metalul Bogdan Vodă	28	12	3	13	54	57	−3	27	
10	Electrica Baia Mare	28	12	2	14	42	67	−25	26	
11	IPP Coștiui	28	11	2	15	53	67	−14	24	
12	Voința Târgu Lăpuș	28	10	3	15	58	74	−16	23	
13	Forestiera Câmpulung la Tisa	28	10	1	17	38	78	−40	21	
14	Paltinul Vadu Izei	28	6	2	20	37	107	−70	14	
15	Voința Baia Mare	28	3	0	25	13	105	−92	6	

Rules for classification: 1) Points; 2) Goal difference; 3) Number of goals scored.
(C) Champions; (Q) Qualified for the phase indicated

=== Prahova County ===
Pos	Team	Pld	W	D	L	GF	GA	GD	Pts	Qualification or relegation
1	Victoria Florești (C, Q)	30	21	5	4	65	15	+50	47	Qualification to promotion play-off
2	Electromotor Câmpina	30	18	6	6	67	23	+44	42	
3	ICIM Câmpina	30	17	4	9	53	35	+18	38	
4	Tricolorul Breaza	30	15	7	8	49	31	+18	37	
5	Minerul Filipeștii de Pădure	30	14	8	8	56	28	+28	36	
6	Petrolul Teleajen Ploiești	30	13	10	7	47	35	+12	36	
7	Rapid Mizil	30	12	8	10	47	38	+9	32	
8	IUC Ploiești	30	12	8	10	39	31	+8	32	
9	Chimistul Valea Călugărească	30	9	10	11	35	38	−3	28	
10	Unirea Teleajen Ploiești	30	12	4	14	40	50	−10	28	
11	PECO Ploiești	30	9	9	12	60	43	+17	27	
12	Geamul Scăieni	30	8	10	12	38	50	−12	26	
13	Feroemail Ploiești	30	9	6	15	39	50	−11	24	
14	Metalul Vălenii de Munte (R)	30	9	5	16	31	59	−28	23	Relegation to Prahova County Championship II
15	Metalul Câmpina (R)	30	6	3	21	25	78	−53	15	Relegation to Prahova County Championship II
16	Tricolorul Negoiești (R)	30	4	1	25	16	103	−87	9	Relegation to Prahova County Championship II

Rules for classification: 1) Points; 2) Goal difference; 3) Number of goals scored.
(C) Champions; (Q) Qualified for the phase indicated; (R) Relegated

=== Sălaj County ===
Pos	Team	Pld	W	D	L	GF	GA	GD	Pts	Qualification or relegation
1	Victoria Elcond Zalău (C, Q)	26	22	3	1	92	21	+71	47	Qualification to promotion play-off
2	Silvania Cehu Silvaniei	26	18	1	7	79	46	+33	37	
3	Progresul Bălan	26	16	3	7	64	43	+21	35	
4	Energia Sânmihaiu Almașului	26	15	3	8	53	31	+22	33	
5	Olimpic Bocșa	26	13	3	10	55	42	+13	29	
6	Voința Derșida	26	12	4	10	39	41	−2	28	
7	Minerul Sărmășag	26	11	3	12	50	55	−5	25	
8	Recolta Agrij	26	10	3	13	57	69	−12	23	
9	Spartac Crasna	26	9	4	13	39	58	−19	22	
10	Armătura Zalău II	26	9	3	14	50	57	−7	21	
11	Unirea Hereclean	26	8	4	14	42	57	−15	20	
12	Unirea Hida	26	8	2	16	44	55	−11	18	
13	Minerul Surduc	26	6	4	16	42	77	−35	16	
14	Tractorul Nușfalău	26	4	0	22	22	82	−60	8	

Rules for classification: 1) Points; 2) Goal difference; 3) Number of goals scored.
(C) Champions; (Q) Qualified for the phase indicated

=== Sibiu County ===
Pos	Team	Pld	W	D	L	GF	GA	GD	Pts	Qualification or relegation
1	Vitrometan Mediaș (C, Q)	28	23	1	4	80	22	+58	47	Qualification to promotion play-off
2	Unirea Ocna Sibiului	28	21	5	2	60	19	+41	47	
3	Metalul IO Sibiu	28	17	7	4	62	22	+40	41	
4	Sparta Mediaș	28	16	3	9	58	34	+24	35	
5	Șantierul Sibiu	28	12	6	10	49	43	+6	30	
6	Mecanica Sibiu	28	11	6	11	45	43	+2	28	
7	CSU Sibiu	28	11	3	14	48	57	−9	25	
8	Carbosin Copșa Mică	28	8	8	12	29	41	−12	24	
9	Record Mediaș	28	8	7	13	43	53	−10	23	
10	Sticla Avrig	28	8	7	13	34	59	−25	23	
11	Viitorul Dumbrăveni	28	8	6	14	36	45	−9	22	
12	Textila Mediaș	28	6	10	12	29	42	−13	22	
13	Gloria Dumbrăveni	28	6	8	14	21	47	−26	20	
14	CFR Sibiu	28	8	2	18	35	61	−26	18	
15	Recolta Alma	28	6	3	19	34	75	−41	15	

Rules for classification: 1) Points; 2) Goal difference; 3) Number of goals scored.
(C) Champions; (Q) Qualified for the phase indicated

=== Timiș County ===
Series I

Pos	Team	Pld	W	D	L	GF	GA	GD	Pts	Qualification or relegation
1	Auto Timișoara (Q)	34	24	9	1	81	14	+67	57	Qualification to championship final
2	Progresul Timișoara	34	26	5	3	85	21	+64	57	
3	Șoimii Timișoara	34	19	9	6	65	22	+43	47	
4	Electrotimiș Timișoara	34	16	9	9	89	42	+47	41	
5	Elba Timișoara	34	16	9	9	66	39	+27	41	
6	Constructorul Lugoj	34	13	8	13	56	38	+18	34	
7	Chimia Margina	34	16	2	16	62	74	−12	34	
8	Modern Timișoara	34	13	7	14	41	39	+2	33	
9	SC Buziaș	34	11	9	14	47	51	−4	31	
10	FZ Banatul Timișoara	34	12	6	16	48	47	+1	30	
11	Șoimii Buziaș	34	11	7	16	41	46	−5	29	
12	SMTCF Lugoj	34	12	4	18	44	70	−26	28	
13	Avântul Chizătău	34	12	4	18	45	79	−34	28	
14	Timișul Șag	34	11	5	18	56	87	−31	27	
15	Bega Belinț	34	11	5	18	48	80	−32	27	
16	Flacăra Făget	34	10	7	17	36	77	−41	27	
17	IRA Timișoara	34	9	8	17	46	49	−3	26	
18	Victoria Carani	34	5	5	24	25	108	−83	15	

Rules for classification: 1) Points; 2) Goal difference; 3) Number of goals scored.
(Q) Qualified for the phase indicated

Series II

Pos	Team	Pld	W	D	L	GF	GA	GD	Pts	Qualification or relegation
1	Textila Timișoara (Q)	34	22	8	4	61	29	+32	52	Qualification to championship final
2	Flacăra Parța	34	22	6	6	78	33	+45	50	
3	Obilici Sânmartinu Sârbesc	34	14	12	8	72	37	+35	40	
4	Ceramica Jimbolia	34	15	9	10	73	39	+34	39	
5	Furnirul Deta	34	15	9	10	52	34	+18	39	
6	IAEM Timișoara	34	13	8	13	62	43	+19	34	
7	Unirea Peciu Nou	34	13	8	13	78	73	+5	34	
8	13 Construcții Timișoara	34	14	5	15	68	61	+7	33	
9	Mănușarul Timișoara	34	15	3	16	52	64	−12	33	
10	Unirea Jimbolia	34	13	6	15	53	46	+7	32	
11	Dacia Timișoara	33	13	5	15	67	68	−1	31	
12	Pobeda Dudeștii Vechi	34	13	5	16	57	78	−21	31	
13	Tehnolemn Timișoara	34	12	6	16	60	55	+5	30	
14	Voința Sânnicolau Mare	34	13	4	17	52	57	−5	30	
15	Progresul Ciacova	34	13	4	17	76	90	−14	30	
16	Progresul Gătaia	34	14	2	18	55	75	−20	30	
17	Voința Șandra	33	11	5	17	46	91	−45	27	
18	Checeana Checea	34	7	1	26	29	121	−92	15	

Rules for classification: 1) Points; 2) Goal difference; 3) Number of goals scored.
(Q) Qualified for the phase indicated

Championship final

The matches was played on 13, 16 and 20 June 1979.

Team 1	Series	Team 2	Game 1	Game 2	Game 3
Textila Timișoara	2–1	Auto Timișoara	1–0	0–1	1–0 (Note: After the second match, penalty shoot-out were executed, Auto won 3–2, but following on appeals, it was decided to play a third match.)

Textila Timișoara won the Timiș County Championship and qualify for promotion play-off in Divizia C.

== See also ==
- 1978–79 Divizia A
- 1978–79 Divizia B
- 1978–79 Divizia C
- 1978–79 Cupa României
