= 1980–81 Divizia B =

Divizia B
- Season: 1980–81
- Promoted: FC Constanța; CS Târgoviște; UTA Arad
- Relegated: CSM Borzești; ROVA Roșiori; Metalul Aiud; Minerul Gura Humorului; Poiana Câmpina; Metalurgistul Cugir; Cimentul Medgidia; Nitramonia Făgăraș; Minerul Moldova Nouă; Chimia Brăila; Sirena București; Minerul Anina
- Top goalscorer: Ion Rotaru (Series I, 27 goals); Nicolae Toporan (Series II, 26 goals); Nicolae Văcariu (Series III, 20 goals)

The 1980–81 Divizia B was the 41st season of the second tier of the Romanian football league system.

The format has been maintained to three series, each of them having 18 teams. At the end of the season the winners of the series promoted to Divizia A and the last four places from each series relegated to Divizia C.

== Team changes ==
=== To Divizia B ===
Relegated from Divizia A

- CS Târgoviște
- Olimpia Satu Mare
- Gloria Buzău

Promoted from Divizia C

- Ceahlăul Piatra Neamț
- CSM Borzești
- CSU Galați
- IMU Medgidia
- Sirena București
- ROVA Roșiori
- Minerul Lupeni
- CFR Timișoara
- Rapid Arad
- CIL Sighetu Marmației
- Metalul Aiud
- Oltul Sfântu Gheorghe

=== From Divizia B ===
Promoted to Divizia A

- FCM Brașov
- Progresul Vulcan București
- Corvinul Hunedoara

Relegated to Divizia C

- Muscelul Câmpulung
- Energia Slatina
- Unirea Alba Iulia
- ICIM Brașov
- Carpați Mârșa
- IS Câmpia Turzii
- Energia Gheorghe Gheorghiu-Dej
- Chimia Turnu Magurele
- Someșul Satu Mare
- Portul Constanța
- FCM Giurgiu
- Strungul Arad

=== Other teams ===
FC Brăila and Progresul Brăila merged, with the latter being absorbed by the former. FC Brăila was then renamed FCM Progresul Brăila.

Progresul Brăila's vacant spot was taken by Chimia Brăila.

Unirea Focșani and Dinamo Focșani merged, with Dinamo being absorbed by Unirea. After the merger, Unirea Focșani was renamed Unirea Dinamo Focșani.

== League tables ==
=== Serie I ===
Pos	Team	Pld	W	D	L	GF	GA	GD	Pts	Promotion or relegation
1	FC Constanța (C, P)	34	22	6	6	69	23	+46	50	Promotion to Divizia A
2	Gloria Bistrița	34	18	7	9	64	41	+23	43	
3	Unirea Dinamo Focșani	34	16	5	13	59	46	+13	37	
4	CS Botoșani	34	16	4	14	52	44	+8	36	
5	Viitorul Gheorgheni	34	16	4	14	39	47	−8	36	
6	CSM Suceava	34	16	3	15	54	35	+19	35	
7	Gloria Buzău	34	15	4	15	46	42	+4	34	
8	Progresul Brăila	34	14	6	14	42	45	−3	34	
9	Ceahlăul Piatra Neamț	34	14	6	14	41	48	−7	34	
10	Delta Tulcea	34	16	1	17	58	52	+6	33	
11	CSU Galați	34	15	3	16	62	59	+3	33	
12	Oltul Sfântu Gheorghe	34	14	5	15	48	47	+1	33	
13	IMU Medgidia	34	14	5	15	41	49	−8	33	
14	Viitorul Vaslui	34	14	5	15	41	58	−17	33	
15	CSM Borzești (R)	34	14	4	16	57	55	+2	32	Relegation to Divizia C
16	Minerul Gura Humorului (R)	34	9	9	16	31	53	−22	27	Relegation to Divizia C
17	Cimentul Medgidia (R)	34	12	3	19	40	67	−27	27	Relegation to Divizia C
18	Chimia Brăila (R)	34	7	8	19	37	70	−33	22	Relegation to Divizia C

Source: romaniansoccer.ro (in Romanian)
Rules for classification: 1) Points; 2) Goal difference; 3) Goals scored; 4) Head-to-head points; 5) Head-to-head goal difference; 6) Head-to-head goals scored; 7) Head-to-head away goals scored.
(C) Champions; (P) Promoted; (R) Relegated

=== Top scorers ===
The Series I top scorers:

27 goals

- (Romania) Ion Rotaru (Delta Tulcea)

24 goals

- (Romania) Constantin Lala (CSU Galați)

16 goals

- (Romania) Ștefan Petcu (FC Constanța)
- (Romania) Vasile Moga (Gloria Bistrița)

15 goals

- (Romania) Aret Ene (CSU Galați)

14 goals

- (Romania) Iulius Nemțeanu (Ceahlăul Piatra Neamț)
- (Romania) Petre Buduru (FC Constanța)
- (Romania) Dumitru Belea (Delta Tulcea)
- (Romania) Viorel Coman (Gloria Bistrița)

=== Serie II ===
Pos	Team	Pld	W	D	L	GF	GA	GD	Pts	Promotion or relegation
1	CS Târgoviște (C, P)	34	24	7	3	68	16	+52	55	Promotion to Divizia A
2	Petrolul Ploiești	34	22	7	5	69	25	+44	51	
3	Rapid București	34	16	6	12	58	37	+21	38	
4	Flacăra-Automecanica Moreni	34	16	5	13	45	41	+4	37	
5	Chimica Târnăveni	34	16	4	14	51	61	−10	36	
6	Autobuzul București	34	15	5	14	50	41	+9	35	
7	Gaz Metan Mediaș	34	14	7	13	40	42	−2	35	
8	Pandurii Târgu Jiu	34	14	6	14	40	34	+6	34	
9	Metalul București	34	13	8	13	49	44	+5	34	
10	Mecanică Fină București	34	13	8	13	47	46	+1	34	
11	Tractorul Brașov	34	15	4	15	41	45	−4	34	
12	Metalul Plopeni	34	14	5	15	47	38	+9	33	
13	Rulmentul Alexandria	34	13	6	15	44	41	+3	32	
14	Șoimii Sibiu	34	13	5	16	41	51	−10	31	
15	ROVA Roșiori (R)	34	13	5	16	38	50	−12	31	Relegation to Divizia C
16	Poiana Câmpina (R)	34	14	2	18	42	51	−9	30	Relegation to Divizia C
17	Nitramonia Făgăraș (R)	34	8	3	23	26	78	−52	19	Relegation to Divizia C
18	Sirena București (R)	34	4	5	25	38	93	−55	13	Relegation to Divizia C

Source: romaniansoccer.ro (in Romanian)
Rules for classification: 1) Points; 2) Goal difference; 3) Goals scored; 4) Head-to-head points; 5) Head-to-head goal difference; 6) Head-to-head goals scored; 7) Head-to-head away goals scored.
(C) Champions; (P) Promoted; (R) Relegated

=== Top scorers ===
The Series II top scorers:

26 goals

- (Romania) Nicolae Toporan (Petrolul Ploiești)

20 goals

- (Romania) Nicolae Sultănoiu (Autobuzul București)

17 goals

- (Romania) Nicolae Dobrin (CS Târgoviște)

14 goals

- (Romania) Vasile Oprișor (Chimica Târnăveni)

13 goals

- (Romania) Florea Voicilă (Rulmentul Alexandria)
- (Romania) Teodor Rădoi (Pandurii Târgu Jiu)

=== Serie III ===
Pos	Team	Pld	W	D	L	GF	GA	GD	Pts	Promotion or relegation
1	UTA Arad (C, P)	34	22	4	8	66	27	+39	48	Promotion to Divizia A
2	Olimpia Satu-Mare	34	19	5	10	68	44	+24	43	
3	Înfrățirea Oradea	34	19	2	13	47	42	+5	40	
4	Bihor Oradea	34	15	8	11	61	39	+22	38	
5	Aurul Brad	34	15	6	13	63	47	+16	36	
6	FCM Reșița	34	17	2	15	51	39	+12	36	
7	CIL Sighetu Marmației	34	16	3	15	50	66	−16	35	
8	CFR Cluj-Napoca	34	15	4	15	61	48	+13	34	
9	CFR Timișoara	34	14	6	14	51	52	−1	34	
10	Minerul Lupeni	34	16	2	16	50	58	−8	34	
11	Rapid Arad	34	14	5	15	47	47	0	33	
12	Minerul Cavnic	34	14	5	15	52	55	−3	33	
13	UM Timișoara	34	13	6	15	43	46	−3	32	
14	Dacia Orăștie	34	13	6	15	45	59	−14	32	
15	Metalul Aiud (R)	34	15	2	17	42	58	−16	32	Relegation to Divizia C
16	Metalurgistul Cugir (R)	34	14	3	17	57	51	+6	31	Relegation to Divizia C
17	Minerul Moldova Nouă (R)	34	11	1	22	44	70	−26	23	Relegation to Divizia C
18	Minerul Anina (R)	34	7	4	23	28	78	−50	18	Relegation to Divizia C

Source: romaniansoccer.ro (in Romanian)
Rules for classification: 1) Points; 2) Goal difference; 3) Goals scored; 4) Head-to-head points; 5) Head-to-head goal difference; 6) Head-to-head goals scored; 7) Head-to-head away goals scored.
(C) Champions; (P) Promoted; (R) Relegated

=== Top scorers ===
The Series III top scorers:

20 goals

- (Romania) Nicolae Văcariu (Minerul Moldova Nouă)

17 goals

- (Romania) Mircea State (Olimpia Satu Mare)
- (Romania) M. Năsălean (CFR Cluj-Napoca)

16 goals

- (Romania) Ionescu (CIL Sighetu Marmației)

15 goals

- (Romania) Viorel Hațeganu (Olimpia Satu Mare)

14 goals

- (Romania) Bucur (Metalurgistul Cugir)

== See also ==
- 1980–81 Divizia A
- 1980–81 Divizia C
- 1980–81 County Championship
- 1980–81 Cupa României
