= AS Răzeșii Valea Mărului =

Romanian football club

Răzeșii Valea Mărului
- Full name: Asociația Club Sportiv; Răzeșii Valea Mărului
- Nicknames: Vălmărenii (The People from Valea Mărului); Răzeșii
- Short name: Valea Mărului
- Founded: 2011; 15 years ago as Avântul Valea Mărului; 2021; 5 years ago as Răzeșii Valea Mărului
- Ground: Prof. Costică Popovici
- Capacity: 1,000
- Owner: Valea Mărului Commune
- Chairman: Novac Costel
- Manager: Tiberiu Popa
- League: Liga V
- 2025–26: Liga V, Galați County, 2nd of 12
Home colours	Away colours

Asociația Sportivă Răzeșii Valea Mărului, commonly known as Răzeșii Valea Mărului, is a Romanian football club based in Valea Mărului, Galați County. The team currently competes in Liga V Galați County, the fifth tier of Romanian football and second at county level.

== History ==
Avântul Valea Mărului earned promotion to Liga IV Galați County at the end of the 2012–13 season by winning Series II of Liga V Galați County. After finishing in 5th place in the 2013–14 season, Vălmărenii claimed the county title the following season, securing a spot in the promotion play-off to Liga III. However, Avântul lost in front of Olimpia Râmnicu Sărat, the Liga IV Buzău County winner, drawing 1–1 away before suffering a heavy 0–6 defeat at home.

The following season, Avântul Valea Mărului, coached by Ovidiu Lupu, won Liga IV Galați County once again, securing promotion to Liga III for the first time in the club's history after defeating Pajura Huși, the Vaslui County winners, in the promotion play-off 7–2 on aggregate (4–1 away and 3–1 at home).

In their debut season in Liga III, Avântul, led by Valentin Cramer, finished in 5th place in Series I. Unfortunately, due to financial problems, the club withdrew from Liga III during the winter break of the 2017–18 season, with Cramer’s team in 14th place. However, the club continued its activity at the youth level with U-15 and U-13 squads.

Avântul was then enrolled in Liga V Galați County at the start of the 2018–19 season, coached by Gheorghiță Popa. Vălmărenii finished 1st, with veteran Romeo Buteseacă as the top goalscorer, securing a return to the fourth division.

The 2019–20 season was suspended in March 2020 due to the COVID-19 pandemic. At the time, Avântul was in 1st place and was declared the Liga IV Galați County winner, qualifying for the promotion play-offs. The matches were played at the Municipal Stadium in Râmnicu Sărat, where the team led by Gheorghiță Popa defeated Victoria Gugești, the Liga IV Vrancea County winner, 2–1 and drew 0–0 against Sportul Chiscani, the Liga IV Brăila County winner, finishing 2nd and earning promotion to the third division.

In the 2020–21 season of Liga III, the team led by Gheorghiță Popa finished 8th in Series II and had to play two more matches in the promotion/relegation play-off against Team Săgeata, the Buzău County winner. Avântul won 5–2 on aggregate (3–1 away and 2–1 at home), securing their place in the third tier.

In the summer of 2021, Avântul withdrew from Liga III once again due to financial difficulties and was reorganized as Răzeșii Valea Mărului in the fourth league. Struggling throughout the 2021–22 season, the team finished last and was subsequently relegated to the fifth league.

== Ground ==
The club plays its home matches on Prof. Costică Popovici Stadium in Valea Mărului, with a capacity of 1,000 people.

== Honours ==
Leagues

Liga IV – Galați County

- Winners (3): 2014–15, 2015–16, 2019–20

Liga V – Galați County

- Winners (2): 2012–13, 2018–19

Cups

Cupa României – Galați County

- Winners (1): 2014–15

== Notable former players ==
The footballers mentioned below have played at least 1 season for Răzeșii and also played in Liga I for another team.

- (Romania) Romeo Buteseacă
- (Romania) Sorin Frunză
- (Romania) Cosmin Gârleanu
- (Romania) Marius Matei
- (Romania) Lucian Murgoci
- (Romania) Alexandru Vlasie

== League and cup history ==
Season	Tier	League	Place	Notes	Cupa României
2024–25	5	Liga V (GL)	2nd		County phase - R1
2024–25	5	Liga V (GL)	7th		
2023–24	5	Liga V (GL)	7th		
2022–23	5	Liga V (GL)	9th		
2021–22	4	Liga IV (GL)	12th	Relegated	
2020–21	3	Liga III (Series II)	8th	Relegated	
2019–20	4	Liga IV (GL)	1st (C)	Promoted	
2018–19	5	Liga V (GL)	1st (C)	Promoted	
2017–18	3	Liga III (Series I)	14th	Relegated	Second round
2016–17	3	Liga III (Series I)	5th		
2015–16	4	Liga IV (GL)	1st (C)	Promoted	Second round
2014–15	4	Liga IV (GL)	1st (C)		
2013–14	4	Liga IV (GL)	5th		
2012–13	5	Liga V (GL)	1st (C)	Promoted	
