= Stadionul Prof. Costică Popovici =

Stadium in Valea Mărului, Romania

- Interactive map of Stadionul Prof. Costică Popovici
- Address: Str. Prof. Costică Popovici
- Location: Valea Mărului, Romania
- Coordinates: 45°50′16.9″N 27°41′38.2″E
- Owner: Commune of Valea Mărului
- Operator: Răzeșii Valea Mărului
- Capacity: 1,000 (0 seated)
- Surface: Grass

Tenant
- Răzeșii Valea Mărului (2011–present)

Stadionul Prof. Costică Popovici is a multi-purpose stadium in Valea Mărului, Romania. It is currently used mostly for football matches, is the home ground of Răzeșii Valea Mărului and holds 1,000 people.
