= LSS Voința Sibiu =

- Full name: Liga Suporterilor Sibieni; Voința Sibiu
- Nicknames: Alb-Verzii (The White and Greens)
- Short name: Voința Sibiu
- Founded: 2013; 13 years ago
- Dissolved: 2026
- Ground: Voința
- Capacity: 2,000
Home colours	Away colours

Liga Suporterilor Sibieni Voința Sibiu, commonly known as LSS Voința Sibiu, or simply as Voința Sibiu, was a Romanian football club from Sibiu, Sibiu County, founded in 2013 as a fan-owned phoenix club of the dissolved CSU Voința Sibiu and dissolved in the summer of 2026. The club also has a women's football section.

== History ==
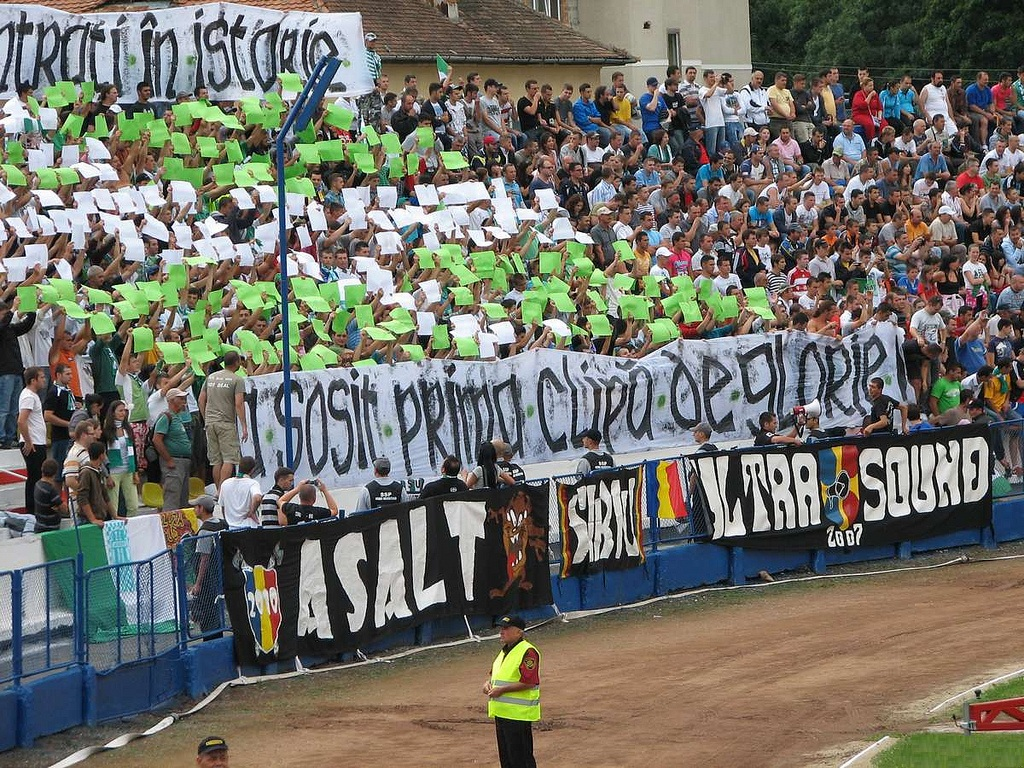
Voința Sibiu supporters in 2011.

CSU Voința continued the football tradition in Sibiu after the dissolution of FC Sibiu and FC Inter Sibiu. The club promoted from the Liga IV to the Liga I in just three seasons. However CSU Voința relegated after only one season of top football, finishing 16th in the table, with 32 points.

After only 11 rounds played in the 2012–13 Liga II Voința withdrew from the championship, because of immense debts.

A phoenix club was immediately created. In 2014 created plans to stage a "Football without owners" tournament on 10 January 2015, inviting other fan-owned phoenix clubs which have been formed due to the mismanagement of their original counterparts: Argeș 1953, ASU Politehnica Timișoara and FC Vaslui, at the event they finished on the second place.

On June 28, they won their first ever trophy the Sibiu County Phase of Romanian Cup, by defeating Silvatex Orlat (7–2) in the final.

In the summer of 2026 the club was dissolved.

== Fans ==
The fans see LSS as the direct successor of CSU's heritage and therefore try to replicate this in every way. The supporters group are called Peluza Sud.

== Honours ==
=== Domestic ===
- Cupa României – Sibiu County
  - Winners (1): 2014–15

=== Friendly ===
- Football without Owners Tournament
  - Runners-up (1): 2015

== League history ==
Season	Tier	Division	Place	Notes	Cupa României
2023–24	4	Liga IV (SB)	TBD		
2022–23	4	Liga IV (SB)	13th		
2021–22	4	Liga IV (SB)	11th		
2020–21	Not active due to the COVID-19 pandemic in Romania				
2019–20	4	Liga IV (SB)	13th		
2018–19	4	Liga IV (SB)	7th		

Season	Tier	Division	Place	Notes	Cupa României
2017–18	4	Liga IV (SB)	8th		
2016–17	4	Liga IV (SB)	7th		
2015–16	4	Liga IV (SB)	6th		
2014–15	4	Liga IV (SB)	3rd		
2013–14	4	Liga IV (SB)	10th		
