= 2015–16 Liga IV =

74th season of the Liga IV, the fourth tier of the Romanian football league

Liga IV
- Season: 2015–16

The 2015–16 Liga IV was the 74th season of the Liga IV, the fourth tier of the Romanian football league system. The champions of each county association play against one from a neighboring county in a playoff to gain promotion.

== County leagues ==
- Alba (AB)
- Arad (AR)
- Argeș (AG)
- Bacău (BC)
- Bihor (BH)
- Bistrița-Năsăud (BN)
- Botoșani (BT)
- Brașov (BV)
- Brăila (BR)
- Bucharest (B)
- Buzău (BZ)
- Caraș-Severin (CS)
- Călărași (CL)
- Cluj (CJ)
- Constanța (CT)
- Covasna (CV)
- Dâmbovița (DB)
- Dolj (DJ)
- Galați (GL)
- Giurgiu (GR)
- Gorj (GJ)
- Harghita (HR)
- Hunedoara (HD)
- Ialomița (IL)
- Iași (IS)
- Ilfov (IF)
- Maramureș (MM)
- Mehedinți (MH)
- Mureș (MS)
- Neamț (NT)
- Olt (OT)
- Prahova (PH)
- Satu Mare (SM)
- Sălaj (SJ)
- Sibiu (SB)
- Suceava (SV)
- Teleorman (TR)
- Timiș (TM)
- Tulcea (TL)
- Vaslui (VS)
- Vâlcea (VL)
- Vrancea (VN)

== Promotion play-off ==
The matches were played on 18 and 25 June 2016.

Team 1	Agg.	Team 2	1st leg	2nd leg
Sportul Chiscani (BR)	6–3	(TL) Șoimii Topolog	2–2	4–1
Venus Independența (CL)	4–6	(CT) Axiopolis Cernavodă	4–3	0–3
Arsenal Malu (GR)	6–1	(B) Progresul București	2–0	4–1
Voința Crevedia (IF)	2–5	(DB) Flacăra Moreni	2–2	0–3
Euromania Dumbrăveni (VN)	1–5	(PH) Păulești	1–3	0–2
Petrolul Berca (BZ)	4–3	(CV) Nemere Ghelința	4–2	0–1
Pajura Huși (VS)	2–7	(GL) Avântul Valea Mărului	1–4	1–3
Siretul Lespezi (IS)	3–1	(BC) Gauss Răcăciuni	2–1	1–0
Voința Ion Creangă (NT)	5–2	(BT) Luceafărul Mihai Eminescu	0–1	5–1
Bistrița (BN)	1–1	(SV) Șomuz Fălticeni	0–0	1–1
Viitorul Ulmeni (MM)	8–0	(SJ) Unirea Mirșid	1–0	7–0
Hidișelu de Sus (BH)	w/o	(SM) Recolta Dorolț	w/o	w/o
Mureșul Vințu de Jos (AB)	4–0	(MS) Mureșul Luduș	1–0	3–0
Gloria Lunca-Teuz Cermei (AR)	3–2 (a.e.t.)	(CJ) Viitorul Feleacu	1–0	2–2 (a.e.t.)
Ripensia Timișoara (TM)	7–0	(HD) Hercules Lupeni	4–0	3–0
Pandurii Cerneți (MH)	1–9	(CS) Școlar Reșița	1–6	0–3 w/o)
Șirineasa (VL)	5–4	(DJ) Tractorul Cetate	4–1	1–3
Hermannstadt (SB)	6–1	(GJ) Gilortul Târgu Cărbuneşti	1–0	5–1
Recolta Stoicănești (OT)	2–5	(AG) Argeș 1953 Piteşti	1–1	1–4
Unirea Cristuru Secuiesc (HR)	3–3	(BV) Olimpic Cetate Râșnov	3–1	0–2
Alexandria (TR)	4–2	(IL) Andrias Andrășești	3–1	1–1

== League standings ==
=== Alba County ===
Pos	Team	Pld	W	D	L	GF	GA	GD	Pts	Qualification or relegation
1	Mureșul Vințu de Jos (C, Q)	30	23	4	3	100	20	+80	73	Qualification to promotion play-off
2	Șurianu Sebeș	30	21	6	3	78	19	+59	69	
3	Viitorul Sântimbru	30	21	1	8	73	30	+43	64	
4	Euro Șpring	30	20	2	8	66	44	+22	62	
5	Ocna Mureș	30	16	7	7	56	34	+22	55	
6	Dalia Sport Daia Romană	30	15	7	8	64	39	+25	52	
7	Pianu	30	15	6	9	71	49	+22	51	
8	Unirea Alba Iulia	30	13	6	11	50	40	+10	45	
9	Inter Ciugud	30	10	6	14	45	47	−2	36	
10	Viitorul Spicul Daia Romană	30	10	5	15	46	48	−2	35	
11	CIL Blaj	30	11	2	17	54	66	−12	35	
12	Rapid CFR Teiuș	30	8	4	18	33	94	−61	28	
13	Olimpia Aiud	30	7	6	17	30	64	−34	27	
14	Energia Săsciori (R)	30	6	4	20	36	74	−38	22	Relegation to Liga V Alba
15	Gaz Metan Valea Lungă (R)	30	5	3	22	30	74	−44	18	Relegation to Liga V Alba
16	Cuprirom Abrud (R)	30	3	3	24	28	118	−90	12	Relegation to Liga V Alba

Rules for classification: 1) Points; 2) Head-to-head points; 3) Head-to-head goal difference; 4) Head-to-head goals scored; 5) Head-to-head away goals scored; 6) Goal difference; 7) Goals scored.
(C) Champions; (Q) Qualified for the phase indicated; (R) Relegated

=== Arad County ===
Pos	Team	Pld	W	D	L	GF	GA	GD	Pts	Qualification or relegation
1	Gloria Lunca-Teuz Cermei (C, Q)	26	21	4	1	88	24	+64	67	Qualification to promotion play-off
2	Unirea Sântana	26	21	2	3	82	24	+58	65	
3	Crișul Chișineu-Criș	26	20	2	4	63	28	+35	62	
4	Progresul Pecica	26	19	3	4	68	22	+46	60	
5	Frontiera Curtici	26	11	6	9	40	32	+8	39	
6	Șoimii Lipova	26	10	5	11	50	35	+15	35	
7	UTA Arad II	26	10	5	11	41	46	−5	35	
8	Păulișana	26	8	5	13	39	62	−23	29	
9	Victoria Zăbrani	26	8	4	14	26	53	−27	28	
10	Victoria Felnac	26	7	4	15	29	54	−25	25	
11	Glogovăț	26	5	6	15	38	60	−22	21	
12	Voința Mailat	26	5	5	16	25	53	−28	20	
13	Aqua Vest Arad (R)	26	5	3	18	33	89	−56	18	Relegation to Liga V Arad
14	Șoimii Șimand (R)	26	4	2	20	34	74	−40	14	Relegation to Liga V Arad

Rules for classification: 1) Points; 2) Head-to-head points; 3) Head-to-head goal difference; 4) Head-to-head goals scored; 5) Head-to-head away goals scored; 6) Goal difference; 7) Goals scored.
(C) Champions; (Q) Qualified for the phase indicated; (R) Relegated

=== Argeș County ===
Pos	Team	Pld	W	D	L	GF	GA	GD	Pts	Qualification
1	Argeș 1953 Pitești	22	19	1	2	94	14	+80	58 (Note: Argeș 1953 Pitești are ahead of Unirea Bascov on head-to-head points: Argeș 1953 Pitești 2–1 Unirea Bascov, Unirea Bascov 0–2 Argeș 1953 Pitești.)	Qualification for championship play-off
2	Unirea Bascov	22	19	1	2	92	14	+78	58	Qualification for championship play-off
3	Victoria Buzoiești	22	15	2	5	76	30	+46	47	Qualification for championship play-off
4	Mioveni II	22	13	5	4	78	27	+51	44	Qualification for championship play-off
5	Gloria Berevoești	22	11	4	7	45	26	+19	37	Qualification for championship play-off
6	Olimpia Suseni	22	11	1	10	58	55	+3	34	Qualification for championship play-off
7	Vulturii Priboieni	22	9	3	10	61	57	+4	30	Qualification for championship play-out
8	Sporting Pitești	22	8	1	13	48	66	−18	25	Qualification for championship play-out
9	Rucăr	22	5	2	15	29	79	−50	17	Qualification for championship play-out
10	DLR Pitești	22	3	5	14	33	65	−32	14	Qualification for championship play-out
11	Micești	22	3	2	17	25	88	−63	11	Qualification for championship play-out
12	Viitorul Ștefănești	22	2	1	19	21	139	−118	7	Qualification for championship play-out

Rules for classification: 1) Points; 2) Head-to-head points; 3) Head-to-head goal difference; 4) Head-to-head goals scored; 5) Head-to-head away goals scored; 6) Goal difference; 7) Goals scored.
Notes:

Championship play-off

Pos	Team	Pld	W	D	L	GF	GA	GD	Pts	Qualification
1	Argeș 1953 Pitești (C, Q)	10	9	0	1	42	6	+36	56	Qualification for promotion play-off
2	Unirea Bascov	10	8	1	1	33	6	+27	54	
3	Mioveni II	10	5	0	5	22	25	−3	37	
4	Gloria Berevoești	10	5	0	5	18	25	−7	34	
5	Victoria Buzoiești	10	1	1	8	8	25	−17	28	
6	Olimpia Suseni	10	1	0	9	10	46	−36	20	

Rules for classification: 1) Points; 2) Head-to-head points; 3) Head-to-head goal difference; 4) Head-to-head goals scored; 5) Head-to-head away goals scored; 6) Goal difference; 7) Goals scored.
(C) Champions; (Q) Qualified for the phase indicated

Championship play-out

Pos	Team	Pld	W	D	L	GF	GA	GD	Pts	Relegation
7	Vulturii Priboieni	10	7	1	2	41	13	+28	37	
8	Micești	10	8	1	1	41	17	+24	31	
9	Sporting Pitești	10	4	1	5	32	31	+1	26	
10	DLR Pitești	10	5	1	4	32	22	+10	23	
11	Rucăr (R)	10	3	0	7	17	44	−27	18	Relegation to Liga V Argeș
12	Viitorul Ștefănești (R)	10	1	0	9	11	47	−36	7	Relegation to Liga V Argeș

Rules for classification: 1) Points; 2) Head-to-head points; 3) Head-to-head goal difference; 4) Head-to-head goals scored; 5) Head-to-head away goals scored; 6) Goal difference; 7) Goals scored.
(R) Relegated

=== Bacău County ===
Pos	Team	Pld	W	D	L	GF	GA	GD	Pts	Qualification or relegation
1	Gauss Răcăciuni (C, Q)	32	26	2	4	110	41	+69	80	Qualification to promotion play-off
2	Biruința Letea Veche Bacău	32	21	5	6	104	36	+68	68	
3	Viitorul Nicolae Bălcescu	32	21	4	7	111	31	+80	67	
4	Tescani	32	21	2	9	102	47	+55	65	
5	Voința Gârleni	32	19	7	6	79	36	+43	64	
6	Filipești	32	19	4	9	80	51	+29	61	
7	Vulturul Măgirești	32	16	9	7	91	61	+30	57	
8	Gloria Zemeș	32	16	5	11	93	77	+16	53	
9	Viitorul Curița	32	13	7	12	82	69	+13	46	
10	Dofteana	32	10	11	11	78	64	+14	41	
11	Moinești	32	10	4	18	66	88	−22	34	
12	Măgura Cașin	32	9	5	18	63	90	−27	32	
13	Siretul Bacău	32	7	7	18	56	96	−40	28 (Note: Siretul Bacău–Negri 5–1; Negri–Siretul Bacău 2–4)	
14	Negri	32	9	1	22	51	135	−84	28	
15	Voința Oituz	32	7	3	22	47	116	−69	24	
16	Târgu Ocna (R)	32	5	5	22	61	122	−61	20	Relegation to Liga V Bacău
17	Flamura Roșie Sascut (R)	32	2	1	29	26	140	−114	7	Relegation to Liga V Bacău
18	Viva Activ Buhuși (R)	0	0	0	0	0	0	0	0 (Note: Viva Activ Buhuși withdrew after 8 rounds and all its results were canceled.)	Expelled

Rules for classification: 1) Points; 2) Head-to-head points; 3) Head-to-head goal difference; 4) Head-to-head goals scored; 5) Head-to-head away goals scored; 6) Goal difference; 7) Goals scored.
(C) Champions; (Q) Qualified for the phase indicated; (R) Relegated

=== Bihor County ===
Pos	Team	Pld	W	D	L	GF	GA	GD	Pts	Qualification or relegation
1	Hidișelu de Sus (C, Q)	26	20	5	1	81	18	+63	65 (Note: Diosig–Hidișelu de Sus 0–1; Hidișelu de Sus–Diosig 0–0;)	Qualification for promotion play-off
2	Diosig	26	21	2	3	94	30	+64	65	
3	Crișul Sântandrei	26	19	1	6	83	34	+49	58	
4	Bihorul Beiuș	26	16	3	7	77	28	+49	51	
5	Mădăras	26	16	1	9	69	37	+32	49 (Note: Mădăras–Ștei 1–2; Ștei–Mădăras 0–3;)	
6	Ștei	26	15	4	7	43	31	+12	49	
7	Unirea Valea lui Mihai	26	14	4	8	64	40	+24	46	
8	Universitatea Oradea	26	10	3	13	48	51	−3	33	
9	Olimpia Salonta	26	9	5	12	57	66	−9	32 (Note: Viitorul Marghita–Olimpia Salonta 1–1; Olimpia Salonta–Viitorul Marghita 5–2;)	
10	Viitorul Marghita	26	10	2	14	42	52	−10	32	
11	Viitorul Borș	26	6	3	17	35	64	−29	21	
12	Crișul Aleșd	26	4	2	20	28	65	−37	11 (Note: Crișul Aleșd deducted 3 points)	
13	Locadin Țețchea	26	3	0	23	31	128	−97	9	
14	Victoria Avram Iancu (R)	26	1	1	24	27	135	−108	4	Relegation to Liga V Bihor
15	Partium Oradea (R)	0	0	0	0	0	0	0	0 (Note: Partium Oradea was excluded after 3 rounds and all the results were canceled.)	Expelled
16	Bihor Oradea II (R)	0	0	0	0	0	0	0	0 (Note: Bihor Oradea II was excluded after 2 rounds and all the results were canceled.)	Expelled

Rules for classification: Rules for classification: 1) Points 2) Head-to-head points; 3) Head-to-head goal difference; 4) Head-to-head goals scored; 5) Head-to-head away goals scored; 6) Goal difference; 7) Goals scored.
(C) Champions; (Q) Qualified for the phase indicated; (R) Relegated

=== Bistrița-Năsăud County ===
Pos	Team	Pld	W	D	L	GF	GA	GD	Pts	Qualification or relegation
1	Bistrița (C, Q)	24	20	4	0	130	17	+113	64	Qualification to promotion play-off
2	Dumitra	24	20	3	1	116	29	+87	63	
3	Progresul Năsăud	24	15	3	6	83	49	+34	48	
4	Voința Cetate	24	13	2	9	64	48	+16	41	
5	Heniu Leșu	24	13	1	10	65	54	+11	40	
6	Atletico Monor	24	12	4	8	52	50	+2	40	
7	Luceafărul Șieu	24	12	1	11	56	62	−6	37	
8	Silvicultorul Maieru	24	8	4	12	71	84	−13	28	
9	Voința Livezile	24	6	3	15	48	84	−36	21	
10	Viitorul Lechința	24	7	0	17	38	88	−50	21	
11	Eciro Forest Telciu	24	6	3	15	26	77	−51	21	
12	Spicul Salva	24	4	3	17	39	85	−46	15	
13	Progresul Tăure (R)	24	3	3	18	33	94	−61	12	Relegation to Liga V Bistrița-Năsăud

Rules for classification: 1) Points; 2) Head-to-head points; 3) Head-to-head goal difference; 4) Head-to-head goals scored; 5) Head-to-head away goals scored; 6) Goal difference; 7) Goals scored.
(C) Champions; (Q) Qualified for the phase indicated; (R) Relegated

=== Botoșani County ===
Pos	Team	Pld	W	D	L	GF	GA	GD	Pts	Qualification or relegation
1	Luceafărul Mihai Eminescu (C, Q)	28	26	0	2	153	28	+125	78	Qualification to promotion play-off
2	TransDor Tudora	28	22	2	4	131	32	+99	68	
3	Sănătatea Darabani	28	20	2	6	88	35	+53	61 (Note: Sănătatea Darabani and Prosport Vârfu Câmpului were penalized by a double forfeit for the match from round 12. (Result: 0-0) and were deducted with 1 point.)	
4	Europa Hilișeu	28	14	6	8	75	67	+8	48	
5	Flacăra Vlăsinești	28	14	5	9	63	42	+21	47	
6	Prosport Vârfu Câmpului	28	11	8	9	62	44	+18	40	
7	Sportivul Trușești	28	14	1	13	64	55	+9	40 (Note: Sportivul Trușești deducted 3 points.)	
8	Bucovina Rogojești	28	11	2	15	56	75	−19	35	
9	Avântul Albești	28	12	3	13	66	60	+6	33 (Note: Avântul Albești deducted 6 points.)	
10	Răchiți	28	9	6	13	53	54	−1	33	
11	Rapid Ungureni	28	9	4	15	34	58	−24	31	
12	Viitorul Blândești	28	8	5	15	47	77	−30	29	
13	Flacăra 1907 Flămânzi (R)	28	8	1	19	51	99	−48	25	Qualification to relegation play-off
14	Speranta Dumbrăvița (R)	28	6	2	20	45	125	−80	20	Qualification to relegation play-off
15	Bucecea (R)	28	2	1	25	18	155	−137	7	Relegation to Liga V Botoșani
16	Șoimii Bălușeni (D)	0	0	0	0	0	0	0	0 (Note: Șoimii Bălușeni withdrew in the first part of the season and all its results were canceled.)	Withdrew

Rules for classification: 1) Points; 2) Head-to-head points; 3) Head-to-head goal difference; 4) Head-to-head goals scored; 5) Head-to-head away goals scored; 6) Goal difference; 7) Goals scored.
(C) Champions; (D) Disqualified; (Q) Qualified for the phase indicated; (R) Relegated

==== Relegation play-off ====
The 13th and 14th-placed teams of the Liga IV faces the 2nd placed teams from the two series of Liga V Botoșani.

Team 1	Score	Team 2
Flacăra 1907 Flămânzi	0–2	Voința Șendriceni
Speranta Dumbrăvița	4–4 (a.e.t.) (5–6 p)	Progresul Ștefănești

=== Brașov County ===
Pos	Team	Pld	W	D	L	GF	GA	GD	Pts	Qualification or relegation
1	Olimpic Cetate Râșnov (C, Q)	30	20	9	1	86	16	+70	69	Qualification to promotion play-off
2	Codlea	30	20	6	4	92	33	+59	66	
3	Zărnești	30	20	3	7	87	40	+47	63	
4	Inter Cristian	30	19	5	6	91	29	+62	62	
5	Precizia Săcele	30	15	7	8	83	46	+37	52	
6	Hălchiu 2013	30	14	10	6	57	31	+26	52	
7	Viitorul Ghimbav	30	14	10	6	56	32	+24	52	
8	Aripile Brașov	30	15	5	10	51	45	+6	50	
9	Chimia Victoria	30	14	6	10	62	48	+14	48	
10	Oltul Fǎgǎraș	30	12	4	14	59	71	−12	40	
11	Cetatea Rupea-Homorod	30	10	2	18	48	82	−34	32	
12	Carpați Berivoi	30	8	5	17	47	83	−36	29	
13	Energia Unirea Feldioara	30	6	4	20	36	92	−56	22	
14	Olimpic Voila	30	4	4	22	32	90	−58	16 (Note: Olimpic Voila was spared from relegation due to the promotion of Olimpic Cetate Râșnov in Liga III.)	Spared from relegation
15	Prietenii Rupea (R)	30	3	4	23	24	93	−69	13	Relegation to Liga V Brașov
16	Bran (R)	30	2	4	24	31	111	−80	10	Relegation to Liga V Brașov

Rules for classification: 1) Points; 2) Head-to-head points; 3) Head-to-head goal difference; 4) Head-to-head goals scored; 5) Head-to-head away goals scored; 6) Goal difference; 7) Goals scored.
(C) Champions; (Q) Qualified for the phase indicated; (R) Relegated

=== Brăila County ===
Pos	Team	Pld	W	D	L	GF	GA	GD	Pts	Qualification
1	Sportul Chiscani	22	21	1	0	92	15	+77	64	Qualification to championship play-off
2	Viitorul Ianca	22	13	5	4	63	28	+35	44	Qualification to championship play-off
3	Victoria Traian	22	14	2	6	78	47	+31	44	Qualification to championship play-off
4	Dacia Unirea Brăila II	22	13	4	5	74	47	+27	43	Qualification to championship play-off
5	Viitorul Însurăței	22	13	2	7	79	50	+29	41	Qualification to championship play-off
6	Victoria Cazasu	22	9	4	9	61	46	+15	31	Qualification to championship play-off
7	Pandurii Tudor Vladimirescu	22	9	1	12	64	55	+9	28	Qualification to championship play-out
8	Făurei	22	8	3	11	46	67	−21	27	Qualification to championship play-out
9	Voința Plopu	22	7	4	11	63	82	−19	25	Qualification to championship play-out
10	Voința Vișani	22	5	3	14	41	91	−50	18	Qualification to championship play-out
11	Gloria Movila Miresii	22	3	1	18	28	72	−44	10	Qualification to championship play-out
12	Voința Șuțești	22	1	2	19	26	115	−89	5	Qualification to championship play-out

Rules for classification: 1) Points; 2) Head-to-head points; 3) Head-to-head goal difference; 4) Head-to-head goals scored; 5) Head-to-head away goals scored; 6) Goal difference; 7) Goals scored.

==== Championship play-off ====
The teams started the play-off with only the points achieved in the regular season against the other qualified teams.

Pos	Team	Pld	W	D	L	GF	GA	GD	Pts	Qualification
1	Sportul Chiscani (C, Q)	10	8	0	2	57	11	+46	52	Qualification to promotion play-off
2	Viitorul Ianca	10	6	0	4	36	16	+20	32	
3	Victoria Cazasu	10	6	2	2	37	22	+15	29	
4	Dacia Unirea Brăila II	10	5	1	4	37	17	+20	27	
5	Victoria Traian	10	2	1	7	24	66	−42	21	
6	Viitorul Însurăței	10	0	2	8	14	73	−59	10	

Rules for classification: 1) Points; 2) Head-to-head points; 3) Head-to-head goal difference; 4) Head-to-head goals scored; 5) Head-to-head away goals scored; 6) Goal difference; 7) Goals scored.
(C) Champions; (Q) Qualified for the phase indicated

==== Championship play-out ====
The teams started the play-out with only the points achieved in the regular season against the other qualified teams.

Pos	Team	Pld	W	D	L	GF	GA	GD	Pts	Relegation
7	Pandurii Tudor Vladimirescu	10	8	0	2	52	14	+38	45	
8	Voința Plopu	10	5	1	4	38	19	+19	35	
9	Făurei	10	5	1	4	24	25	−1	35	
10	Gloria Movila Miresii	10	6	0	4	32	23	+9	25	
11	Voința Vișani	10	2	1	7	21	43	−22	22 (Note: Voința Vișani was spared from relegation due to the promotion of Sportul Chiscani in Liga III.)	Spared from relegation
12	Voința Șuțești (R)	10	2	1	7	16	59	−43	12	Relegation to Liga V Brăila

Rules for classification: 1) Points; 2) Head-to-head points; 3) Head-to-head goal difference; 4) Head-to-head goals scored; 5) Head-to-head away goals scored; 6) Goal difference; 7) Goals scored.
(R) Relegated

=== Bucharest ===
Pos	Team	Pld	W	D	L	GF	GA	GD	Pts	Qualification or relegation
1	Progresul București (Q)	26	19	5	2	74	21	+53	62 (Note: Electroaparataj–Progresul 1–2; Progresul–Electroaparataj 0–1;)	Qualification to promotion play-off
2	Electroaparataj București	26	20	2	4	69	18	+51	62	
3	Comprest GIM București	26	19	3	4	80	44	+36	60	
4	Sportul Studențesc București	26	21	4	1	114	22	+92	57 (Note: Sportul Studențesc deducted 10 points.)	
5	Termo București	26	15	4	7	60	32	+28	49	
6	Metaloglobus București II	26	14	1	11	77	49	+28	43	
7	Unirea Tricolor București	26	10	4	12	59	61	−2	34	
8	Venus București	26	11	1	14	48	55	−7	34	
9	Electrica București	26	9	0	17	40	54	−14	27	
10	Frăția București	26	8	3	15	48	81	−33	27	
11	Romprim București	26	9	0	17	53	116	−63	27	
12	Victoria București	26	6	1	19	45	97	−52	19	
13	VK Soccer București	25	3	0	22	19	84	−65	9 (Note: VK Soccer and LSM excluded in the second part of the season and lost all remaining matches with 0–3.)	
14	LSM București	25	2	2	21	20	72	−52	8	

Rules for classification: 1) Points; 2) Head-to-head points; 3) Head-to-head goal difference; 4) Head-to-head goals scored; 5) Head-to-head away goals scored; 6) Goal difference; 7) Goals scored.
(Q) Qualified for the phase indicated

=== Buzău County ===
Pos	Team	Pld	W	D	L	GF	GA	GD	Pts	Qualification or relegation
1	Petrolul Berca (C, Q)	30	30	0	0	194	19	+175	90	Qualification to promotion play-off
2	Metalul Buzău	30	25	2	3	188	26	+162	77	
3	Voința Lanurile	30	23	4	3	158	23	+135	73	
4	Avântul Zărnești	30	18	3	9	79	61	+18	57	
5	Înfrățirea Zoița	30	18	1	11	73	59	+14	55	
6	Locomotiva Viitorul Buzău	30	13	3	14	79	81	−2	42	
7	Com Sageata	30	11	5	14	72	80	−8	38	
8	Diadema Gherăseni	30	10	8	12	61	71	−10	38	
9	Șoimii Costești	30	12	2	16	80	91	−11	38	
10	Șoimii Siriu	30	12	1	17	78	105	−27	37	
11	Recolta Sălcioara	30	10	5	15	76	76	0	35	
12	Viitorul 08 Vernești	30	9	5	16	77	101	−24	32	
13	Carpați Nehoiu	30	10	2	18	55	107	−52	32	
14	Victoria Boboc (R)	30	9	3	18	45	77	−32	30	Qualification to relegation play-off
15	Gloria Vadu Pașii (R)	30	5	1	24	60	174	−114	16	Qualification to relegation play-off
16	Voința Lunca (R)	30	1	3	26	25	249	−224	6	Relegation to Liga V Buzău

Rules for classification: 1) Points; 2) Head-to-head points; 3) Head-to-head goal difference; 4) Head-to-head goals scored; 5) Head-to-head away goals scored; 6) Goal difference; 7) Goals scored.
(C) Champions; (Q) Qualified for the phase indicated; (R) Relegated

==== Relegation play-off ====
The 14th and 15th-placed teams of Liga IV Buzău faces the 2nd-placed teams in the two series of Liga V Buzău.

Team 1	Agg.	Team 2	1st leg	2nd leg
Victoria Boboc	2–9	Partizanul Merei	0–3	2–6
Gloria Vadu Pașii	5–7	Tricolorul Gălbinași	4–4	1–3

=== Caraș-Severin County ===
Pos	Team	Pld	W	D	L	GF	GA	GD	Pts	Qualification or relegation
1	CSM Școlar Reșița (C, Q)	28	26	1	1	165	10	+155	79	Qualification to promotion play-off
2	Voința Lupac	28	23	4	1	194	28	+166	73	
3	Rapid Buchin	28	18	2	8	103	50	+53	56	
4	Oravița	28	17	1	10	108	58	+50	52	
5	Nera Bozovici	28	14	4	10	71	63	+8	46	
6	Berzasca	28	13	3	12	80	46	+34	42	
7	Ad Mediam Mehadia	28	14	0	14	52	73	−21	42	
8	Moldova Nouă	28	12	4	12	54	81	−27	40	
9	Minerul Anina	28	12	3	13	77	87	−10	39	
10	Muncitorul Reșița	28	9	4	15	64	119	−55	31	
11	Agmonia Zăvoi	28	8	5	15	58	94	−36	29	
12	Metalul Bocșa	28	8	3	17	41	84	−43	27	
13	Hidrocon Marga	28	8	2	18	54	73	−19	26	
14	Caransebeș II	28	7	3	18	57	73	−16	24	
15	Negrea Reșița	28	1	1	26	23	262	−239	4	

Rules for classification: 1) Points; 2) Head-to-head points; 3) Head-to-head goal difference; 4) Head-to-head goals scored; 5) Head-to-head away goals scored; 6) Goal difference; 7) Goals scored.
(C) Champions; (Q) Qualified for the phase indicated

=== Călărași County ===
Pos	Team	Pld	W	D	L	GF	GA	GD	Pts	Qualification or relegation
1	Venus Independența (C, Q)	30	24	5	1	140	26	+114	77	Qualification to promotion play-off
2	Victoria Chirnogi	30	23	3	4	129	36	+93	72	
3	Dunărea Ciocănești	30	18	5	7	86	44	+42	59	
4	Agricola Borcea	30	20	3	7	115	51	+64	63	
5	Unirea Mânăstirea	30	13	7	10	68	62	+6	46	
6	Rapid Ulmeni	30	13	5	12	65	62	+3	44	
7	Victoria Dragoș Vodă	30	12	6	12	63	68	−5	42	
8	Dunărea Grădiștea	30	13	3	14	44	70	−26	42	
9	Vitorul Curcani	30	12	4	14	56	85	−29	40	
10	Steaua Radovanu	30	12	2	16	61	83	−22	38	
11	Unirea Dragalina	30	11	5	14	68	95	−27	38	
12	Spicul Roseți	30	10	7	13	91	82	+9	37	
13	Victoria Lehliu	30	9	7	14	59	79	−20	34	
14	Progresul Fundulea	30	10	1	19	57	102	−45	31	
15	Conpet Ștefan Cel Mare (R)	30	4	5	21	52	125	−73	17	Relegation to Liga V Călărași
16	Belciugatele (R)	30	1	2	27	13	97	−84	5	Relegation to Liga V Călărași

Rules for classification: 1) Points; 2) Head-to-head points; 3) Head-to-head goal difference; 4) Head-to-head goals scored; 5) Head-to-head away goals scored; 6) Goal difference; 7) Goals scored.
(C) Champions; (Q) Qualified for the phase indicated; (R) Relegated

=== Cluj County ===
Pos	Team	Pld	W	D	L	GF	GA	GD	Pts	Qualification or relegation
1	Viitorul Feleacu (C, Q)	26	20	2	4	62	31	+31	62	Qualification to promotion play-off
2	Potaissa 2011 Turda	24	17	3	4	101	34	+67	54	
3	Luceafărul 2010 Cluj-Napoca	24	14	4	6	65	26	+39	46	
4	Armenopolis Gherla	24	13	6	5	61	41	+20	45	
5	Arieșul Mihai Viteazu	24	13	5	6	60	30	+30	44	
6	Vulturul Mintiu Gherlii	24	13	4	7	42	36	+6	43	
7	Industria Sârmei Câmpia Turzii	24	13	3	8	65	38	+27	42	
8	Someșul Gilău	24	11	1	12	44	46	−2	34	
9	Unirea Tritenii de Jos	24	6	5	13	42	60	−18	23	
10	Unirea Florești	24	6	4	14	41	59	−18	22	
11	Ardealul Cluj	24	5	2	17	57	98	−41	17	
12	CFR Dej	24	3	2	19	27	87	−60	11	
13	Someșul Apahida	24	2	1	21	29	110	−81	7	

Rules for classification: 1) Points; 2) Head-to-head points; 3) Head-to-head goal difference; 4) Head-to-head goals scored; 5) Head-to-head away goals scored; 6) Goal difference; 7) Goals scored.
(C) Champions; (Q) Qualified for the phase indicated

=== Constanța County ===
Pos	Team	Pld	W	D	L	GF	GA	GD	Pts	Qualification or relegation
1	Axiopolis Cernavodă (C, Q)	34	29	3	2	126	34	+92	90	Qualification to promotion play-off
2	Agigea	34	22	5	7	111	58	+53	71 (Note: Agigea are ahead of Gloria Băneasa on head-to-head points: Agigea 0–0 Gloria Băneasa, Gloria Băneasa 0–7 Agigea.)	
3	Gloria Băneasa	34	22	5	7	97	55	+42	71	
4	Victoria Mihai Viteazu	34	19	8	7	102	47	+55	65	
5	Ovidiu	34	19	6	9	86	56	+30	63	
6	Dunărea Ostrov	34	18	4	12	82	58	+24	58	
7	Eforie	34	18	3	13	96	67	+29	57	
8	Mihail Kogălniceanu	34	15	5	14	111	90	+21	50	
9	Avântul Comana	34	14	8	12	72	78	−6	50	
10	Unirea Topraisar	34	15	4	15	60	63	−3	49	
11	Portul Constanța	34	13	5	16	68	70	−2	44	
12	CFR Constanța	34	12	7	15	87	98	−11	43	
13	Viitorul Fântânele	34	12	6	16	79	81	−2	42	
14	Farul Tuzla	34	11	7	16	54	90	−36	40	
15	Sparta Techirghiol	34	10	4	20	70	90	−20	34	
16	Știința ACALAB Poarta Albă	34	8	2	24	65	119	−54	26	
17	Voința Valu lui Traian (R)	34	4	5	25	50	103	−53	17	Relegation to Liga V Constanța
18	Victoria Cumpăna (R)	34	0	3	31	28	187	−159	3	Relegation to Liga V Constanța

Rules for classification: 1) Points; 2) Head-to-head points; 3) Head-to-head goal difference; 4) Head-to-head goals scored; 5) Head-to-head away goals scored; 6) Goal difference; 7) Goals scored.
(C) Champions; (Q) Qualified for the phase indicated; (R) Relegated

=== Covasna County ===
Pos	Team	Pld	W	D	L	GF	GA	GD	Pts	Qualification or relegation
1	Nemere Ghelința (C, Q)	28	23	2	3	69	29	+40	71	Qualification to promotion play-off
2	Brețcu	28	19	4	5	78	26	+52	61	
3	Păpăuți	28	17	6	5	75	36	+39	57	
4	KSE Târgu Secuiesc	28	17	4	7	90	34	+56	55	
5	Cernat	28	15	6	7	84	38	+46	51	
6	Oltul Chilieni	28	15	4	9	75	37	+38	49	
7	Venus Ozun	28	14	4	10	69	32	+37	46	
8	Prima Brăduț	28	13	4	11	62	53	+9	43	
9	Harghita Aita Mare	28	12	6	10	66	64	+2	42	
10	Perko Sânzieni	28	8	4	16	43	61	−18	28	
11	Ojdula	28	8	2	18	43	80	−37	26	
12	Avântul Ilieni	28	8	4	16	41	52	−11	25 (Note: Avântul Ilieni deducted 3 points.)	
13	BSE Belin	28	5	5	18	30	91	−61	20	
14	Progresul Sita Buzăului (R)	28	4	1	23	26	112	−86	13 (Note: Progresul Sita Buzăului was excuded from championship after 26 rounds and lost all the remaining matches with 0–3.)	Relegation to Liga V Covasna
15	Baraolt	28	3	2	23	30	136	−106	11	
16	Viitorul Moacșa (D)	0	0	0	0	0	0	0	0 (Note: Viitorul Moacșa withdrew from the championship in the first part of the season and all its results were canceled.)	Withdrew

Rules for classification: 1) Points; 2) Head-to-head points; 3) Head-to-head goal difference; 4) Head-to-head goals scored; 5) Head-to-head away goals scored; 6) Goal difference; 7) Goals scored.
(C) Champions; (D) Disqualified; (Q) Qualified for the phase indicated; (R) Relegated

=== Dâmbovița County ===
Pos	Team	Pld	W	D	L	GF	GA	GD	Pts	Qualification or relegation
1	Flacăra Moreni (C, Q)	34	31	2	1	154	12	+142	95	Qualification to promotion play-off
2	PAS Pucioasa	34	22	6	6	90	53	+37	72	
3	Recolta Gura Șuții	34	21	5	8	70	46	+24	68	
4	Gloria Gaz Metan Cornești	34	21	4	9	105	54	+51	67	
5	Avicola Tărtășești	34	20	3	11	79	53	+26	63	
6	Voința Perșinari	34	17	4	13	82	67	+15	55	
7	Libertatea Urziceanca	34	18	1	15	101	75	+26	55	
8	Luceafărul Dragomirești	34	16	5	13	82	77	+5	53	
9	Petrolul Târgoviște	34	13	7	14	57	53	+4	45 (Note: Petrolul Târgoviște deducted one point.)	
10	Progresul Mătăsaru	34	13	2	19	55	88	−33	41	
11	Petrești	34	13	1	20	72	115	−43	40	
12	Știința Odobești	34	12	4	18	76	100	−24	40	
13	Unirea Ungureni	34	12	4	18	54	75	−21	40	
14	Comerțul Brezoaele	34	12	3	19	66	100	−34	39	
15	Bradul Moroeni (Note: Bradul Moroeni was spared from relegation due to the promotion of Flacăra Moreni to Liga III.)	34	12	2	20	54	90	−36	38	Spared from relegation
16	Atletic Fieni (R)	34	11	5	18	70	86	−16	38	Relegation to Liga V Dâmbovița
17	Unirea Cobia (R)	34	4	8	22	53	115	−62	20	Relegation to Liga V Dâmbovița
18	Săgeata Găești (R)	34	5	0	29	31	92	−61	15	Relegation to Liga V Dâmbovița

Rules for classification: 1) Points; 2) Head-to-head points; 3) Head-to-head goal difference; 4) Head-to-head goals scored; 5) Head-to-head away goals scored; 6) Goal difference; 7) Goals scored.
(C) Champions; (Q) Qualified for the phase indicated; (R) Relegated

=== Dolj County ===
==== Regular season ====
Pos	Team	Pld	W	D	L	GF	GA	GD	Pts	Qualification or relegation
1	Tractorul Cetate	22	16	3	3	68	26	+42	51	Qualification to play-off
2	Dunărea Calafat	22	16	2	4	69	26	+43	50	Qualification to play-off
3	Viitorul Cârcea	22	16	0	6	88	34	+54	48	Qualification to play-off
4	Recolta Ostroveni	22	14	5	3	61	34	+27	47	Qualification to play-off
5	Știința Danubius Bechet	22	12	4	6	61	30	+31	40	Qualification to play-off
6	Progresul Segarcea	22	11	2	9	48	40	+8	35	Qualification to play-off
7	Dunărea Bistreț	22	10	4	8	70	48	+22	34	Qualification to play-out
8	Sic Pan Unirea	22	8	2	12	56	60	−4	26 (Note: Sic Pan Unirea withdrew in the second part of the Regular season and lost all remaining matches with 0–3.)	Qualification to play-out
9	Metropolitan Ișalnița	22	7	1	14	50	57	−7	22	Qualification to play-out
10	Unirea Leamna	22	5	1	16	34	82	−48	16	Qualification to play-out
11	Luceafărul Craiova	22	4	1	17	23	88	−65	13	Qualification to play-out
12	Știința Malu Mare	22	0	1	21	28	131	−103	1	Qualification to play-out

Rules for classification: 1) Points; 2) Head-to-head points; 3) Head-to-head goal difference; 4) Head-to-head goals scored; 5) Head-to-head away goals scored; 6) Goal difference; 7) Goals scored.

==== Championship play-off ====
Teams started the play-off with their points from the Regular season halved, rounded upwards, and no other records carried over from the Regular season.

Pos	Team	Pld	W	D	L	GF	GA	GD	Pts	Qualification
1	Tractorul Cetate (C, Q)	10	7	2	1	40	18	+22	49	Qualification for promotion play-off
2	Viitorul Cârcea	10	7	2	1	41	21	+20	47	
3	Dunărea Calafat	10	5	2	3	22	15	+7	42	
4	Știința Danubius Bechet	10	3	0	7	18	28	−10	29	
5	Progresul Segarcea	10	3	1	6	17	26	−9	28	
6	Recolta Ostroveni	10	1	1	8	18	48	−30	28	

Rules for classification: 1) Points; 2) Head-to-head points; 3) Head-to-head goal difference; 4) Head-to-head goals scored; 5) Head-to-head away goals scored; 6) Goal difference; 7) Goals scored.
(C) Champions; (Q) Qualified for the phase indicated

==== Championship play-out ====
Teams started the play-out with their points from the Regular season halved, rounded upwards, and no other records carried over from the Regular season.

Pos	Team	Pld	W	D	L	GF	GA	GD	Pts	Relegation
7	Metropolitan Ișalnița	8	7	1	0	20	7	+13	33	
8	Dunărea Bistreț	8	5	0	3	32	14	+18	32	
9	Unirea Leamna	8	4	1	3	25	24	+1	21	
10	Luceafărul Craiova	8	2	0	6	16	22	−6	13	
11	Știința Malu Mare (R)	8	1	0	7	13	39	−26	4	Relegation to Liga V Dolj
12	Sic Pan Unirea (D)	0	0	0	0	0	0	0	0 (Note: Sic Pan Unirea withdrew in the second part of the Regular season.)	Withdrew

Rules for classification: 1) Points; 2) Head-to-head points; 3) Head-to-head goal difference; 4) Head-to-head goals scored; 5) Head-to-head away goals scored; 6) Goal difference; 7) Goals scored.
(D) Disqualified; (R) Relegated

=== Galați County ===
Pos	Team	Pld	W	D	L	GF	GA	GD	Pts	Qualification or relegation
1	Avântul Valea Mărului	30	26	4	0	122	23	+99	82	Qualification to promotion play-off
2	Fulgerul Smulți	30	23	4	3	117	36	+81	73	
3	Unirea Braniștea	30	21	2	7	97	39	+58	65	
4	Muncitorul Ghidigeni	30	21	1	8	80	48	+32	64	
5	Avântul Vânatori	30	17	7	6	78	41	+37	58	
6	Gloria Ivești	30	19	0	11	79	49	+30	57	
7	Victoria Independența	30	14	3	13	76	81	−5	45	
8	Viitorul Costache Negri	30	13	2	15	67	66	+1	41	
9	Zimbrul Slobozia Conachi	30	11	4	15	80	74	+6	37	
10	CSȘ Tecuci	30	10	7	13	68	67	+1	37	
11	Juventus 2007 Toflea	30	11	1	18	66	81	−15	34	
12	Quantum Club Galați	30	10	2	18	76	85	−9	32	
13	Luceafărul Petrolul Schela	30	9	2	19	52	116	−64	29	
14	Avântul Drăgănești	30	9	1	20	55	115	−60	28	
15	Bujorii Târgu Bujor	30	3	0	27	25	126	−101	9	
16	Șoimii Fundeni	30	2	2	26	26	117	−91	8	

Rules for classification: 1) Points; 2) Head-to-head points; 3) Head-to-head goal difference; 4) Head-to-head goals scored; 5) Head-to-head away goals scored; 6) Goal difference; 7) Goals scored.

=== Giurgiu County ===
==== South Series ====
Pos	Team	Pld	W	D	L	GF	GA	GD	Pts	Qualification or relegation
1	Dunărea Giurgiu (Q)	26	22	4	0	140	20	+120	70 (Note: Arsenal Malu–Dunărea Giurgiu 0–0; Dunărea Giurgiu–Arsenal Malu 1–0.)	Qualification to championship play-off
2	Arsenal Malu (Q)	26	23	1	2	163	14	+149	70	Qualification to championship play-off
3	Unirea Izvoarele	26	22	1	3	119	18	+101	67	
4	Mihai Bravu	26	18	1	7	79	34	+45	51 (Note: Mihai Bravu deducted 4 points.)	
5	Real Colibași	26	15	1	10	62	74	−12	46	
6	Voința Slobozia	26	11	3	12	53	91	−38	36	
7	Prundu	26	8	6	12	42	67	−25	30	
8	Spicul Izvoru	26	9	3	14	47	81	−34	30	
9	Dunărea Oinacu	26	8	4	14	48	47	+1	28	
10	Argeșul Hotarele	26	9	3	14	70	89	−19	28 (Note: Argeșul Hotarele deducted 2 points.)	
11	Progresul Valea Dragului	26	8	2	16	61	96	−35	26	
12	Mihai Viteazu Călugăreni	26	5	2	19	45	102	−57	17	
13	Viitorul Vedea	26	3	2	21	43	147	−104	11	
14	Real Vărăști	26	4	1	21	36	128	−92	1 (Note: Real Vărăști deducted 12 points, subsequently excluded from the championship and lost all remaining matches with 0–3.)	

Rules for classification: 1) Points; 2) Head-to-head points; 3) Head-to-head goal difference; 4) Head-to-head goals scored; 5) Head-to-head away goals scored; 6) Goal difference; 7) Goals scored.
(Q) Qualified for the phase indicated

==== North Series ====
Pos	Team	Pld	W	D	L	GF	GA	GD	Pts	Qualification or relegation
1	Singureni (Q)	26	23	0	3	114	28	+86	69	Qualification to championship play-off
2	Avântul Florești (Q)	26	19	3	4	71	39	+32	60	Qualification to championship play-off
3	Viitorul Toporu	26	17	3	6	77	44	+33	54	
4	Argeșul Mihăilești	26	16	4	6	86	62	+24	52	
5	Viitorul Tântava	26	13	2	11	71	58	+13	41	
6	Petrolul Roata de Jos	26	14	2	10	51	41	+10	41 (Note: Petrolul Roata de Jos deducted 3 points.)	
7	Zmeii Ogrezeni	26	11	4	11	96	57	+39	37	
8	Silver Inter Zorile	26	11	3	12	70	75	−5	34 (Note: Silver Inter Zorile deducted 2 points.)	
9	Unirea Joița	26	10	2	14	61	71	−10	32	
10	Bolintin Malu Spart	26	9	2	15	57	86	−29	29	
11	Voința Podișor	26	7	0	19	62	99	−37	21	
12	Olimpia Mârșa	26	6	3	17	50	110	−60	21	
13	Buturugeni	26	5	3	18	52	100	−48	18	
14	Luceafărul Trestieni	26	4	3	19	51	99	−48	15	

Rules for classification: 1) Points; 2) Head-to-head points; 3) Head-to-head goal difference; 4) Head-to-head goals scored; 5) Head-to-head away goals scored; 6) Goal difference; 7) Goals scored.
(Q) Qualified for the phase indicated

==== Championship play-off ====
The championship play-off played between the best two ranked teams in each series of the regular season. All matches were played at Comunal Stadium in Bolintin-Deal on 7 and 8 June 2016 the semi-finals and on 11 June 2016 the final.

===== Semi-finals =====
Team 1	Score	Team 2
Dunărea Giurgiu	1–1 (5–6 p)	Avântul Florești
Singureni	0–2	Arsenal Malu

===== Final =====
Team 1	Score	Team 2
Arsenal Malu	4–0	Avântul Florești

Arsenal Malu won the 2015–16 Liga IV Giurgiu County and qualify to promotion play-off in Liga III.

=== Gorj County ===
Pos	Team	Pld	W	D	L	GF	GA	GD	Pts	Qualification or relegation
1	Gilortul Târgu Cărbunești (C, Q)	32	28	1	3	135	23	+112	85	Qualification to promotion play-off
2	Internațional Bălești	32	25	3	4	103	21	+82	78	
3	Știința Turceni	32	22	5	5	114	37	+77	71	
4	Știința Hurezeni	32	19	7	6	70	37	+33	64	
5	Unirea Crușeț	32	19	1	12	92	49	+43	58	
6	Petrolul Bustuchin	32	15	4	13	97	69	+28	49	
7	Vulturii Fărcășești	32	14	5	13	73	72	+1	47	
8	Parângul Bumbești-Jiu	32	13	8	11	65	53	+12	47	
9	Știința Godinești	32	13	3	16	63	97	−34	42	
10	Avântul Bărbătești	32	13	3	16	62	96	−34	42	
11	Minerul Mătăsari II	32	11	8	13	48	57	−9	41	
12	Petrolul Stoina	32	11	7	14	59	67	−8	40	
13	Petrofac Țicleni	32	10	7	15	53	70	−17	34 (Note: Petrofac Țicleni deducted 3 points.)	
14	Energetica Tismana	32	9	5	18	41	67	−26	32	
15	Viitorul Negomir	32	7	2	23	45	99	−54	23	
16	Stejari	32	2	5	25	26	116	−90	11	
17	Jiul Rovinari	32	3	2	27	34	150	−116	11	

Rules for classification: 1) Points; 2) Head-to-head points; 3) Head-to-head goal difference; 4) Head-to-head goals scored; 5) Head-to-head away goals scored; 6) Goal difference; 7) Goals scored.
(C) Champions; (Q) Qualified for the phase indicated

=== Harghita County ===
Pos	Team	Pld	W	D	L	GF	GA	GD	Pts	Qualification or relegation
1	Unirea Cristuru Secuiesc (C, Q)	24	20	2	2	87	39	+48	62	Qualification to promotion play-off
2	Roseal Odorheiu Secuiesc	24	12	3	9	57	50	+7	39	
3	Minerul Bălan	24	11	2	11	58	69	−11	35	
4	Homorod Merești	24	11	1	12	69	58	+11	34	
5	Viitorul Gheorgheni	24	10	4	10	67	72	−5	34	
6	Pro Mureșul Toplița	24	10	1	13	54	54	0	31	
7	Szefite Sânsimion	24	3	1	20	22	72	−50	10 (Note: Szefite Sânsimion was excluded from championship after 21 rounds and lost all the remaining matches with 0–3.)	

Rules for classification: 1) Points; 2) Head-to-head points; 3) Head-to-head goal difference; 4) Head-to-head goals scored; 5) Head-to-head away goals scored; 6) Goal difference; 7) Goals scored.
(C) Champions; (Q) Qualified for the phase indicated

=== Hunedoara County ===
Pos	Team	Pld	W	D	L	GF	GA	GD	Pts	Qualification or relegation
1	Hercules Lupeni (C, Q)	26	19	5	2	70	20	+50	62	Qualification to promotion play-off
2	Inter Petrila	26	19	3	4	88	21	+67	60	
3	Șoimul Băița	26	18	5	3	87	28	+59	59	
4	Retezatul Hațeg	26	15	6	5	75	30	+45	51	
5	Aurul Brad	26	16	2	8	57	34	+23	50	
6	Metalul Crișcior	26	12	4	10	35	43	−8	40	
7	Aurul Certej	26	10	8	8	51	45	+6	38	
8	Universitatea Petroșani	26	11	4	11	52	47	+5	37	
9	Vulcan	26	7	9	10	32	40	−8	30	
10	Gloria Geoagiu (R)	25	7	2	16	29	61	−32	23 (Note: Gloria Geoagiu and Cetate Deva II withdrew from championship.)	Relegation to Liga V Hunedoara
11	Minerul Uricani	26	5	7	14	34	63	−29	22	
12	Victoria Călan	26	6	3	17	26	59	−33	21	
13	Jiul Petroșani	26	5	2	19	28	78	−50	17	
14	Cetate Deva II (R)	25	1	0	24	12	107	−95	3	Relegation to Liga V Hunedoara

Rules for classification: 1) Points; 2) Head-to-head points; 3) Head-to-head goal difference; 4) Head-to-head goals scored; 5) Head-to-head away goals scored; 6) Goal difference; 7) Goals scored.
(C) Champions; (Q) Qualified for the phase indicated; (R) Relegated

=== Ialomița County ===
Pos	Team	Pld	W	D	L	GF	GA	GD	Pts	Qualification or relegation
1	Andrias Andrășești (C, Q)	30	25	1	4	87	32	+55	76	Qualification to promotion play-off
2	Unirea Ion Roată	30	23	2	5	124	52	+72	71	
3	Rapid Fetești	30	20	3	7	109	63	+46	63	
4	Victoria Țăndărei	30	18	3	9	86	53	+33	57	
5	Victoria Munteni-Buzău	30	16	3	11	77	58	+19	51 (Note: Victoria Munteni-Buzău–Viitorul Axintele 2–1; Viitorul Axintele–Victoria Munteni-Buzău 0–0.)	
6	Viitorul Axintele	30	15	6	9	73	52	+21	51	
7	Abatorul Slobozia	30	15	5	10	73	61	+12	50	
8	Recolta Gheorghe Doja	30	13	3	14	88	83	+5	42	
9	Recolta Gheorghe Lazăr	30	9	4	17	75	75	0	31	
10	Fulgerul Fierbinți	30	9	4	17	61	81	−20	31	
11	Spicul Colilia	30	10	6	14	61	78	−17	30 (Note: Spicul Colilia deducted 6 points.)	
12	Traian	30	9	3	18	61	96	−35	30	
13	Amara (R)	30	7	6	17	61	124	−63	27	Qualification to relegation play-off
14	Olimpia Rădulești (R)	30	10	2	18	55	69	−14	26 (Note: Olimpia Rădulești deducted 6 points, withdrew and lost all matches from the second part of the season with 0–3.)	Relegation to Liga V Ialomița
15	Recolta Bărcănești	30	8	2	20	55	78	−23	26	Qualification to relegation play-off
16	Voința Reviga (R)	30	6	1	23	43	134	−91	13 (Note: Voința Reviga deducted 6 points.)	Relegation to Liga V Ialomița

Rules for classification: 1) Points; 2) Head-to-head points; 3) Head-to-head goal difference; 4) Head-to-head goals scored; 5) Head-to-head away goals scored; 6) Goal difference; 7) Goals scored.
(C) Champions; (Q) Qualified for the phase indicated; (R) Relegated
Notes:

Relegation play-off

The 13th- and 15th-placed teams of Liga IV faced the 2nd-placed teams from the two series of Liga V Ialomița County.

Team 1	Score	Team 2
Amara	–	Voința Maia
Recolta Bărcănești	3–1	Rapid Perieți

=== Iași County ===
Pos	Team	Pld	W	D	L	GF	GA	GD	Pts	Qualification or relegation
1	Siretul Lespezi (C, Q)	28	27	1	0	106	10	+96	82	Qualification to promotion play-off
2	Steaua Magică Iași	28	21	3	4	79	19	+60	66	
3	Unirea Mircești	28	21	2	5	103	37	+66	65	
4	Venus Butea	28	18	3	7	78	27	+51	57	
5	Tomești	28	13	3	12	61	61	0	42	
6	Stejarul Bârnova	28	13	1	14	59	72	−13	40	
7	Unirea Ruginoasa	28	12	3	13	43	52	−9	39	
8	Forța Podu Iloaiei	28	11	3	14	47	65	−18	36	
9	Gloria Bălțați	28	10	4	14	54	62	−8	34	
10	Viitorul Hârlău	28	10	4	14	45	58	−13	34	
11	Stejarul Sinești	28	9	4	15	41	54	−13	31	
12	Viitorul Lungani	28	10	1	17	45	67	−22	31	
13	Olimpia Popricani	28	9	3	16	30	62	−32	30	
14	Gloria Balș	28	4	4	20	30	75	−45	16	
15	Holboca (R)	28	1	3	24	22	122	−100	6	Relegation to Liga V Iași

Rules for classification: 1) Points; 2) Head-to-head points; 3) Head-to-head goal difference; 4) Head-to-head goals scored; 5) Head-to-head away goals scored; 6) Goal difference; 7) Goals scored.
(C) Champions; (Q) Qualified for the phase indicated; (R) Relegated

=== Ilfov County ===
==== Seria 1 ====
Pos	Team	Pld	W	D	L	GF	GA	GD	Pts	Qualification or relegation
1	Chitila	24	22	1	1	129	23	+106	67	Ineligible for promotion
2	Voința Crevedia (Q)	24	19	4	1	117	13	+104	61	Qualification to championship play-off
3	Bragadiru (Q)	24	16	3	5	78	20	+58	51	Qualification to championship play-off
4	Athletico Floreasca	24	13	3	8	74	59	+15	42	
5	Viitorul Domnești II	24	13	2	9	59	56	+3	41	
6	Măgurele	24	10	4	10	58	73	−15	34	
7	Cornetu	24	9	4	11	38	44	−6	31	
8	Voluntari III	24	10	1	13	54	78	−24	31	
9	Periș	24	8	4	12	55	83	−28	28	
10	Glina	24	7	3	14	47	62	−15	24	
11	Corbeanca	24	5	2	17	41	90	−49	17	
12	Dărăști	24	4	5	15	33	100	−67	17	
13	Voința Buftea	24	2	0	22	16	98	−82	6	

Rules for classification: 1) Points; 2) Head-to-head points; 3) Head-to-head goal difference; 4) Head-to-head goals scored; 5) Head-to-head away goals scored; 6) Goal difference; 7) Goals scored.
(Q) Qualified for the phase indicated

==== Seria 2 ====
Pos	Team	Pld	W	D	L	GF	GA	GD	Pts	Qualification or relegation
1	Viitorul Dragomirești-Vale (Q)	22	17	4	1	110	26	+84	55	Qualification to championship play-off
2	Pescărușul Grădiștea (Q)	22	15	4	3	81	37	+44	49	Qualification to championship play-off
3	Viitorul Petrăchioaia	22	13	1	8	63	57	+6	40	
4	Fulgerul Cernica	22	11	3	8	68	35	+33	36	
5	Ciorogârla	22	10	6	6	68	47	+21	36	
6	Gloria Islaz	22	10	1	11	67	76	−9	31	
7	Speranța Săbăreni	22	8	4	10	47	52	−5	28	
8	Viitorul Găneasa	22	8	4	10	45	53	−8	28	
9	Ștefănești II	22	8	3	11	48	72	−24	27	
10	Victoria Tânganu	22	5	7	10	47	58	−11	22	
11	Vulturul Pasărea	22	4	2	16	49	115	−66	14	
12	Gloria Buriaș	22	2	3	17	39	104	−65	9	

Rules for classification: 1) Points; 2) Head-to-head points; 3) Head-to-head goal difference; 4) Head-to-head goals scored; 5) Head-to-head away goals scored; 6) Goal difference; 7) Goals scored.
(Q) Qualified for the phase indicated

==== Championship play-off ====
The Championship play-off will be played between the first two teams from each series of the regular season.

All matches were played at Voința Stadium from Ghermănești.

===== Semi-finals =====
Team 1	Score	Team 2
Pescărușul Grădiștea	0–2	Voința Crevedia
Bragadiru	2–1	Viitorul Dragomirești-Vale

===== Final =====
Team 1	Score	Team 2
Voința Crevedia	4–1	Bragadiru

Voința Crevedia won the 2015–16 Liga IV Ilfov County and qualify to promotion play-off in Liga III.

=== Maramureș County ===
==== North Series ====
Pos	Team	Pld	W	D	L	GF	GA	GD	Pts	Qualification or relegation
1	Avântul Bârsana (Q)	18	17	1	0	85	23	+62	52	Qualification to championship final
2	Iza Dragomirești	17	14	0	3	67	22	+45	42	
3	Zorile Moisei	18	13	1	4	44	22	+22	40	
4	Remeți	18	9	0	9	36	34	+2	27	
5	Recolta Săliștea de Sus	18	7	2	9	33	46	−13	23	
6	Metalul Bogdan Vodă	18	6	3	9	41	48	−7	21	
7	Luceafărul Strâmtura	18	6	2	10	43	54	−11	20	
8	Tisa Sarasău	18	6	0	12	35	66	−31	18	
9	Salina Ocna Șugatag	17	3	2	12	27	54	−27	11	
10	Foresta Câmpulung la Tisa	18	2	1	15	24	66	−42	7	
11	Bradul Vișeu de Sus (D)	0	0	0	0	0	0	0	0 (Note: Bradul Vișeu de Sus and Rozalina Rozavlea withdrew in the first part of the season and all their results were canceled.)	Withdrew
12	Rozalina Rozavlea (D)	0	0	0	0	0	0	0	0	Withdrew

Rules for classification: 1) Points; 2) Head-to-head points; 3) Head-to-head goal difference; 4) Head-to-head goals scored; 5) Head-to-head away goals scored; 6) Goal difference; 7) Goals scored.
(D) Disqualified; (Q) Qualified for the phase indicated

==== South Series ====
Pos	Team	Pld	W	D	L	GF	GA	GD	Pts	Qualification or relegation
1	Viitorul Ulmeni (Q)	22	21	0	1	132	27	+105	63	Qualification to championship final
2	Lăpușul Târgu Lăpuș	22	16	4	2	85	26	+59	52	
3	Progresul Șomcuta Mare	22	13	3	6	59	41	+18	42	
4	Fărcașa	22	12	4	6	68	42	+26	40	
5	Progresul Dumbrăvița	22	11	5	6	72	42	+30	38	
6	Unirea Șișești	22	11	2	9	49	49	0	35	
7	Gloria Chechiș	22	11	2	9	53	54	−1	35	
8	Minerul Cavnic	22	8	1	13	37	69	−32	25	
9	Comuna Satulung	22	7	1	14	40	75	−35	22	
10	Seini	22	7	0	15	42	62	−20	21	
11	Unirea Săsar	22	4	0	18	33	89	−56	12	
12	Electrica Baia Mare	22	0	0	22	15	109	−94	0	

Rules for classification: 1) Points; 2) Head-to-head points; 3) Head-to-head goal difference; 4) Head-to-head goals scored; 5) Head-to-head away goals scored; 6) Goal difference; 7) Goals scored.
(Q) Qualified for the phase indicated

==== Championship final ====
The championship final was played on 11 June 2016 at Viorel Mateianu Stadium in Baia Mare.

Team 1	Score	Team 2
Viitorul Ulmeni	2–1	Avântul Bârsana

Viitorul Ulmeni won the 2015–16 Liga IV Maramureș County and qualify to promotion play-off in Liga III.

=== Mehedinți County ===
Pos	Team	Pld	W	D	L	GF	GA	GD	Pts	Qualification or relegation
1	Pandurii Cerneți (C, Q)	28	24	3	1	98	28	+70	75	Qualification to promotion play-off
2	Recolta Dănceu	28	17	4	7	75	47	+28	55	
3	Strehaia	28	15	5	8	71	42	+29	50	
4	Corcova	28	15	4	9	61	44	+17	49	
5	Viitorul Cujmir	28	10	3	15	42	53	−11	33 (Note: Dunărea Gruia and Viitorul Cujmir withdrew from the championship after 14 rounds and lost all the remaining matches with 0–3.)	
6	Viitorul Șimian	28	7	3	18	38	73	−35	24	
7	Coșuștea Căzănești	28	6	5	17	46	94	−48	23	
8	Dunărea Gruia	28	4	1	23	22	72	−50	13	

Rules for classification: 1) Points; 2) Head-to-head points; 3) Head-to-head goal difference; 4) Head-to-head goals scored; 5) Head-to-head away goals scored; 6) Goal difference; 7) Goals scored.
(C) Champions; (Q) Qualified for the phase indicated

=== Mureș County ===
Pos	Team	Pld	W	D	L	GF	GA	GD	Pts	Qualification or relegation
1	Mureșul Luduș (C, Q)	34	27	4	3	145	24	+121	85	Qualification to promotion play-off
2	ASA 2013 Târgu Mureș II	34	26	3	5	119	41	+78	81	
3	Miercurea Nirajului	34	25	5	4	156	49	+107	80	
4	Mureșul Rușii-Munți	34	23	5	6	131	41	+90	74	
5	Târnava Mică Sângeorgiu de Pădure	34	23	5	6	117	45	+72	74	
6	Lacul Ursu Mobila Sovata	34	20	6	8	98	51	+47	66	
7	Viitorul Ungheni	34	18	4	12	112	86	+26	58	
8	Gaz Metan Târgu Mureș	34	17	4	13	73	62	+11	55	
9	Gaz Metan Daneș	34	16	2	16	91	111	−20	50	
10	MSE 08 Târgu Mureș	34	12	4	18	75	109	−34	40	
11	Sărmașu	34	12	4	18	57	91	−34	40	
12	Mureșul Nazna	34	11	3	20	66	95	−29	36	
13	Mureșul Cuci	34	9	5	20	59	89	−30	32	
14	Atletic Târgu Mureș	34	8	6	20	71	113	−42	30	
15	Avântul Miheșu de Câmpie	34	8	6	20	66	119	−53	30	
16	Unirea Tricolor Târnăveni (R)	34	8	3	23	48	95	−47	27	Relegation to Liga V Mureș
17	Rază de Soare Acățari (R)	34	5	1	28	49	142	−93	16	Relegation to Liga V Mureș
18	Arena Sighișoara (R)	34	3	0	31	45	215	−170	9	Relegation to Liga V Mureș

Rules for classification: 1) Points; 2) Head-to-head points; 3) Head-to-head goal difference; 4) Head-to-head goals scored; 5) Head-to-head away goals scored; 6) Goal difference; 7) Goals scored.
(C) Champions; (Q) Qualified for the phase indicated; (R) Relegated

=== Neamț County ===
Pos	Team	Pld	W	D	L	GF	GA	GD	Pts	Qualification or relegation
1	Voința Ion Creangă (Q)	30	26	1	3	118	31	+87	79	Qualification to championship play-off
2	Speranța Răucești (Q)	30	25	2	3	123	40	+83	77	Qualification to championship play-off
3	Bradul Borca (Q)	30	25	2	3	124	24	+100	77	Qualification to championship play-off
4	Victoria Horia (Q)	30	20	5	5	82	30	+52	65	Qualification to championship play-off
5	Bradul Roznov	30	17	3	10	75	62	+13	54	
6	Cimentul Bicaz	30	15	5	10	88	42	+46	50	
7	Teiul Poiana Teiului	30	14	6	10	68	46	+22	48	
8	Moldova Cordun	30	15	1	14	65	62	+3	46	
9	Tineretul Cândești	30	16	3	11	77	52	+25	51	
10	Voința Rediu	30	12	3	15	64	65	−1	39	
11	Zimbrul Vânători-Neamț	30	11	3	16	49	75	−26	36	
12	LPS Roman	30	7	2	21	50	125	−75	23	
13	Zimbrul Pâncești	30	6	2	22	44	80	−36	20	
14	Voința Dobreni	30	5	0	25	42	126	−84	15	
15	Unirea Tămășeni	30	4	1	25	31	126	−95	13	
16	LPS Piatra Neamț	30	2	1	27	37	151	−114	7	

Rules for classification: 1) Points; 2) Head-to-head points; 3) Head-to-head goal difference; 4) Head-to-head goals scored; 5) Head-to-head away goals scored; 6) Goal difference; 7) Goals scored.
(Q) Qualified for the phase indicated

==== Championship play-off ====
Championship play-off played in a single round-robin tournament between the best four teams of the regular season. The teams started the play-off with the following points: 1st place – 3 points, 2nd place – 2 points, 3rd place – 1 point, 4th place – 0 points.

All matches were played at Cimentul Stadium from Bicaz.

Pos	Team	Pld	W	D	L	GF	GA	GD	Pts	Qualification	VIC	SPR	BBO	VHO
1	Voința Ion Creangă (C, Q)	3	2	0	1	11	12	−1	9	Qualification for promotion play-off	—	3–8	4–3	4–1
2	Speranța Răucești	3	2	0	1	15	8	+7	8		—	—	2–4	5–1
3	Bradul Borca	3	2	0	1	11	9	+2	7		—	—	—	4–3
4	Victoria Horia	3	0	0	3	5	13	−8	0		—	—	—	—

Legend: Blue = home team win; Yellow = draw; Red = away team win.
Rules for classification: 1) Points; 2) Head-to-head points; 3) Head-to-head goal difference; 4) Head-to-head goals scored; 5) Head-to-head away goals scored; 6) Goal difference; 7) Goals scored.
(C) Champions; (Q) Qualified for the phase indicated

=== Olt County ===
Pos	Team	Pld	W	D	L	GF	GA	GD	Pts	Qualification or relegation
1	Recolta Stoicănești (C, Q)	22	18	2	2	65	22	+43	56	Qualification to promotion play-off
2	Milcov	22	17	2	3	67	18	+49	53	
3	Vedea Văleni Nicolae Titulescu	22	16	2	4	61	19	+42	50	
4	Viitorul Grădinile	22	15	2	5	53	16	+37	47	
5	Petrolul Potcoava	22	11	4	7	44	27	+17	37	
6	Voința 2012 Băbiciu	22	11	2	9	42	30	+12	35	
7	Avântul Coteana	22	9	3	10	32	40	−8	30	
8	Victoria Dobrun	22	8	0	14	31	46	−15	24	
9	Vedița Colonești	22	5	3	14	32	53	−21	18	
10	Viitorul Rusănești	22	6	0	16	28	68	−40	18	
11	Olt Scornicești	22	3	0	19	21	74	−53	9	
12	Oltul Curtișoara	22	3	0	19	24	87	−63	9	

Rules for classification: 1) Points; 2) Head-to-head points; 3) Head-to-head goal difference; 4) Head-to-head goals scored; 5) Head-to-head away goals scored; 6) Goal difference; 7) Goals scored.
(C) Champions; (Q) Qualified for the phase indicated

=== Prahova County ===
Pos	Team	Pld	W	D	L	GF	GA	GD	Pts	Qualification or relegation
1	Păulești (C, Q)	30	26	1	3	132	22	+110	79	Qualification to promotion play-off
2	Blejoi	30	23	3	4	100	18	+82	72	
3	Cornu	30	21	3	6	90	35	+55	66	
4	Bănești-Urleta	30	19	5	6	72	22	+50	62	
5	Avântul Măneciu	30	17	4	9	82	66	+16	55	
6	Teleajenul Vălenii de Munte	30	14	8	8	68	47	+21	50	
7	Plopeni	30	14	6	10	47	33	+14	48	
8	Tufeni Băicoi	30	11	5	14	53	64	−11	38	
9	Astra II Ciorani	30	10	7	13	56	65	−9	37	
10	Ceptura	30	11	3	16	45	74	−29	36	
11	Progresul Drăgănești	30	9	6	15	48	78	−30	33	
12	Unirea Cocorăștii Colț	30	10	2	18	47	83	−36	32	
13	Tricolorul Breaza	30	9	4	17	37	63	−26	31	
14	Brebu	30	8	3	19	43	83	−40	27	
15	Unirea Urlați (R)	30	7	2	21	35	92	−57	23	Relegation to Liga V Prahova
16	Voința Găzarul Surani (R)	30	0	0	30	22	132	−110	0 (Note: The results of the Voinţa Găzarul Surani from the second part of the season were approved with the score of 0–3 in favor of the opponents, according to the decision taken in the Executive Office on July 4.)	Relegation to Liga V Prahova

Rules for classification: 1) Points; 2) Head-to-head points; 3) Head-to-head goal difference; 4) Head-to-head goals scored; 5) Head-to-head away goals scored; 6) Goal difference; 7) Goals scored.
(C) Champions; (Q) Qualified for the phase indicated; (R) Relegated

=== Satu Mare County ===
Pos	Team	Pld	W	D	L	GF	GA	GD	Pts	Qualification or relegation
1	Recolta Dorolț (C, Q)	24	20	3	1	102	29	+73	63	Qualification to promotion play-off
2	Someșul Oar	24	19	2	3	68	24	+44	59	
3	Luceafărul Decebal	24	16	1	7	93	58	+35	49	
4	Unirea Tășnad	24	15	3	6	79	38	+41	48	
5	Talna Orașu Nou	24	15	1	8	80	51	+29	46	
6	Voința Doba	24	11	4	9	64	56	+8	37	
7	Victoria Carei	24	11	2	11	57	60	−3	35	
8	Turul Micula	24	11	1	12	58	66	−8	34	
9	Cetate 2010 Ardud	24	8	3	13	60	68	−8	27	
10	Viitorul Vetiș	24	7	3	14	42	94	−52	24	
11	Crasna Moftinu Mare	24	4	3	17	45	74	−29	15	
12	Sportul Botiz	24	3	2	19	21	68	−47	11 (Note: Sportul Botiz withdrew in the second part of the season and lost all remaining matches with 0–3.)	
13	Știința Beltiug	24	2	0	22	21	104	−83	6	

Rules for classification: 1) Points; 2) Head-to-head points; 3) Head-to-head goal difference; 4) Head-to-head goals scored; 5) Head-to-head away goals scored; 6) Goal difference; 7) Goals scored.
(C) Champions; (Q) Qualified for the phase indicated

=== Sălaj County ===
Pos	Team	Pld	W	D	L	GF	GA	GD	Pts	Qualification or relegation
1	Unirea Mirșid (C, Q)	26	21	2	3	100	34	+66	65	Qualification to promotion play-off
2	Rapid Jibou	26	19	3	4	113	30	+83	60	
3	Dumbrava Gâlgău Almașului	26	19	1	6	113	37	+76	58	
4	Silvania Cehu Silvaniei	26	18	4	4	85	47	+38	58	
5	Barcău Nușfalău	26	18	2	6	77	35	+42	56	
6	Flacăra Halmășd	26	17	3	6	87	44	+43	54	
7	Olimpic Bocșa	26	10	1	15	58	86	−28	31	
8	Chieșd	26	9	2	15	51	72	−21	29	
9	Gloria Ban	26	8	3	15	48	77	−29	27	
10	Crasna	26	8	1	17	38	82	−44	25	
11	Hida	26	6	5	15	39	89	−50	23	
12	Gloria Bobota	26	4	4	18	36	93	−57	16	
13	Sportul Șimleu Silvaniei	26	4	2	20	23	92	−69	14	
14	Benfica Ileanda	26	3	3	20	28	78	−50	12	

Rules for classification: 1) Points; 2) Head-to-head points; 3) Head-to-head goal difference; 4) Head-to-head goals scored; 5) Head-to-head away goals scored; 6) Goal difference; 7) Goals scored.
(C) Champions; (Q) Qualified for the phase indicated

=== Sibiu County ===
Pos	Team	Pld	W	D	L	GF	GA	GD	Pts	Qualification or relegation
1	Hermannstadt (C, Q)	22	22	0	0	99	12	+87	66	Qualification to promotion play-off
2	Păltiniș Rășinari	22	16	1	5	89	37	+52	49	
3	Avrig	22	13	4	5	53	23	+30	43	
4	Unirea Miercurea Sibiului	22	14	1	7	53	28	+25	43	
5	Sparta Mediaș	22	13	2	7	53	36	+17	41	
6	Voința Sibiu	22	13	2	7	49	45	+4	41	
7	Tălmaciu	22	7	5	10	46	44	+2	26	
8	Agnita	22	5	6	11	60	68	−8	21	
9	Măgura Cisnădie II	22	4	4	14	38	74	−36	16	
10	Continental Sibiu	22	4	2	16	21	68	−47	14	
11	ASA Sibiu	22	2	4	16	23	84	−61	10	
12	Progresul Terezian Sibiu	22	2	3	17	23	88	−65	9	

Rules for classification: 1) Points; 2) Head-to-head points; 3) Head-to-head goal difference; 4) Head-to-head goals scored; 5) Head-to-head away goals scored; 6) Goal difference; 7) Goals scored.
(C) Champions; (Q) Qualified for the phase indicated

=== Suceava County ===
Pos	Team	Pld	W	D	L	GF	GA	GD	Pts	Qualification or relegation
1	Șomuz Fălticeni (C, Q)	26	19	4	3	74	22	+52	61	Qualification to promotion play-off
2	Rapid CFR Suceava II	26	16	7	3	70	22	+48	55	
3	Șomuzul Preutești	26	16	4	6	74	35	+39	52	
4	Bradul Putna	26	17	1	8	73	46	+27	52	
5	Dorna Vatra Dornei	26	17	0	9	72	32	+40	51	
6	Viitorul Liteni	26	15	2	9	83	48	+35	47	
7	Progresul Frătăuții Vechi	26	14	1	11	50	52	−2	43	
8	Victoria Vatra Moldoviței	26	11	6	9	45	47	−2	39	
9	Gura Humorului	26	10	6	10	26	33	−7	36	
10	Bucovina Rădăuți II	26	8	2	16	50	81	−31	26	
11	Moldova Drăgușeni	26	8	1	17	50	104	−54	25	
12	Recolta Fântânele	26	6	3	17	39	66	−27	21	
13	Viitorul Verești	26	4	2	20	38	88	−50	14	
14	Știința Vicovu de Sus (R)	26	0	3	23	10	79	−69	3 (Note: Știința Vicovu de Sus withdrew during the winter break and lost all matches from the second part with 0–3.)	Relegation to Liga V Suceava

Rules for classification: 1) Points; 2) Head-to-head points; 3) Head-to-head goal difference; 4) Head-to-head goals scored; 5) Head-to-head away goals scored; 6) Goal difference; 7) Goals scored.
(C) Champions; (Q) Qualified for the phase indicated; (R) Relegated

=== Teleorman County ===
Pos	Team	Pld	W	D	L	GF	GA	GD	Pts	Qualification or relegation
1	Alexandria (C, Q)	30	28	1	1	128	13	+115	85	Qualification to promotion play-off
2	Unirea Brânceni	30	21	4	5	86	27	+59	67	
3	Viață Nouă Olteni	30	20	4	6	103	38	+65	64	
4	Unirea Petrolul Videle	30	18	5	7	77	32	+45	59	
5	Seaca	30	15	7	8	79	48	+31	52	
6	Rapid Buzescu	30	15	3	12	61	40	+21	48	
7	Unirea Țigănești	30	14	5	11	83	66	+17	47	
8	Voința Saelele	30	13	4	13	83	53	+30	43	
9	Astra Plosca	30	11	5	14	47	64	−17	38	
10	Metalul Peretu	30	11	3	16	48	59	−11	36	
11	Nanov	30	10	4	16	70	71	−1	34	
12	Avântul Bragadiru	30	11	1	18	56	70	−14	34	
13	Dunărea Zimnicea	30	8	5	17	40	51	−11	29	
14	Atletic Orbeasca	30	7	3	20	41	75	−34	24	
15	Metalul Frăsinet (R)	30	6	2	22	43	81	−38	20 (Note: Metalul Frăsinet and Spicpo Poroschia withdrew from the championship after 16 rounds and lost all remaining matches with 0–3.)	Relegation to Liga V Teleorman
16	Spicpo Poroschia (R)	30	2	2	26	33	96	−63	8	Relegation to Liga V Teleorman

Rules for classification: 1) Points; 2) Head-to-head points; 3) Head-to-head goal difference; 4) Head-to-head goals scored; 5) Head-to-head away goals scored; 6) Goal difference; 7) Goals scored.
(C) Champions; (Q) Qualified for the phase indicated; (R) Relegated

=== Timiș County ===
Pos	Team	Pld	W	D	L	GF	GA	GD	Pts	Qualification or relegation
1	Ripensia Timișoara (C, Q)	32	28	3	1	150	28	+122	87	Qualification to promotion play-off
2	Voința Mașloc	32	27	3	2	108	18	+90	84	
3	Ghiroda	32	26	1	5	117	38	+79	73 (Note: Ghiroda deducted 6 points.)	
4	Progresul Gătaia	32	17	6	9	77	57	+20	57	
5	Dumbrăvița	32	18	3	11	85	43	+42	57	
6	Unirea Sânnicolau Mare	32	17	6	9	72	47	+25	57	
7	Cocoșul Orțișoara	32	15	5	12	64	54	+10	50	
8	Poli Timișoara II	32	15	4	13	96	53	+43	49	
9	Voința Biled	32	14	3	15	62	55	+7	45	
10	Avântul Periam	32	12	4	16	54	73	−19	40	
11	Pobeda Dudeștii Vechi	32	10	3	19	61	97	−36	33	
12	Timișul Șag	32	10	3	19	59	90	−31	33	
13	Peciu Nou	32	7	6	19	57	86	−29	27	
14	Murani	32	7	5	20	57	124	−67	26	
15	Arsenal Flacăra Făget	32	8	1	23	46	114	−68	25	
16	Marcel Băban Jimbolia (Note: Due to the promotion of Ripensia Timișoara to Liga III, Marcel Băban Jimbolia was spared from relegation.)	32	6	4	22	29	120	−91	22	Spared from relegation
17	CFR Timișoara (R)	32	5	0	27	36	133	−97	15	Relegation to Liga V Timiș
18	Lorena Giarmata Vii (D)	0	0	0	0	0	0	0	0 (Note: Lorena Giarmata Vii withdrew from the championship after 13 rounds and all its results were canceled.)	Withdrew

Rules for classification: 1) Points; 2) Head-to-head points; 3) Head-to-head goal difference; 4) Head-to-head goals scored; 5) Head-to-head away goals scored; 6) Goal difference; 7) Goals scored.
(C) Champions; (D) Disqualified; (Q) Qualified for the phase indicated; (R) Relegated

=== Tulcea County ===
Pos	Team	Pld	W	D	L	GF	GA	GD	Pts	Qualification or relegation
1	Șoimii Topolog (Q)	20	17	1	2	86	27	+59	52	Qualification to championship play-off
2	Pescărușul Sarichioi (Q)	20	15	2	3	82	25	+57	47	Qualification to championship play-off
3	Triumf Cerna (Q)	20	10	2	8	56	52	+4	32	Qualification to championship play-off
4	Hamangia Baia (Q)	20	6	3	11	40	56	−16	21	Qualification to championship play-off
5	Granitul Babadag	20	4	3	13	35	67	−32	15	
6	Delta Stars Tulcea	20	1	3	16	21	93	−72	6	

Rules for classification: 1) Points; 2) Head-to-head points; 3) Head-to-head goal difference; 4) Head-to-head goals scored; 5) Head-to-head away goals scored; 6) Goal difference; 7) Goals scored.
(Q) Qualified for the phase indicated

==== Championship play-off ====
===== Semi-finals =====
Team 1	Score	Team 2
Pescărușul Sarichioi	7–2	Triumf Cerna
Șoimii Topolog	4–0	Hamangia Baia

===== Final =====
Team 1	Score	Team 2
Șoimii Topolog	2–2 (7–6 p)	Pescărușul Sarichioi

Șoimii Topolog won the 2015–16 Liga IV Tulcea County and qualify to promotion play-off in Liga III.

=== Vaslui County ===
Pos	Team	Pld	W	D	L	GF	GA	GD	Pts	Qualification or relegation
1	Pajura Huși (Q)	16	14	0	2	82	20	+62	42	Qualification to championship play-off
2	Vitis Șuletea (Q)	16	13	0	3	52	16	+36	39	Qualification to championship play-off
3	Gârceni (Q)	16	11	1	4	48	25	+23	34	Qualification to championship play-off
4	Sporting Bârlad (Q)	16	9	2	5	49	28	+21	29	Qualification to championship play-off
5	Vaslui	16	9	0	7	45	41	+4	27	
6	Multim Perieni	16	5	2	9	30	50	−20	17	
7	Viitorul Rebricea	16	4	1	11	35	63	−28	13	
8	Unirea Banca	16	3	1	12	28	72	−44	10	
9	Flacăra Murgeni	16	0	1	15	20	74	−54	1	
10	SMART Negrești (D)	0	0	0	0	0	0	0	0 (Note: SMART Negrești withdrew in the first part of the season and all its results were canceled.)	Withdrew

Rules for classification: 1) Points; 2) Head-to-head points; 3) Head-to-head goal difference; 4) Head-to-head goals scored; 5) Head-to-head away goals scored; 6) Goal difference; 7) Goals scored.
(D) Disqualified; (Q) Qualified for the phase indicated

==== Championship play-off ====
Pos	Team	Pld	W	D	L	GF	GA	GD	Pts	Qualification
1	Pajura Huși (C, Q)	6	5	0	1	18	6	+12	15	Qualification to promotion play-off
2	Gârceni	6	4	0	2	15	14	+1	12	
3	Sporting Bârlad	6	2	1	3	14	17	−3	7	
4	Vitis Șuletea	6	0	1	5	6	16	−10	1	

Rules for classification: 1) Points; 2) Head-to-head points; 3) Head-to-head goal difference; 4) Head-to-head goals scored; 5) Head-to-head away goals scored; 6) Goal difference; 7) Goals scored.
(C) Champions; (Q) Qualified for the phase indicated

=== Vâlcea County ===
Pos	Team	Pld	W	D	L	GF	GA	GD	Pts	Qualification or relegation
1	Șirineasa (Q)	30	23	4	3	97	17	+80	73	Qualification to promotion play-off
2	Flacăra Horezu	30	23	3	4	116	37	+79	72	
3	Cavalerul Trac Cernișoara	30	20	3	7	91	41	+50	63	
4	Cozia Călimănești	30	20	2	8	105	60	+45	62	
5	Mihăești	30	18	3	9	87	61	+26	57	
6	Posada Perișani	30	17	5	8	102	43	+59	56	
7	Unirea Tomșani	30	13	8	9	72	61	+11	47	
8	Mădulari	30	14	4	12	67	60	+7	46	
9	Băbeni	30	14	3	13	70	71	−1	45	
10	Vointa Orlești	30	13	6	11	72	67	+5	45	
11	Viitorul Dăești	30	14	2	14	76	76	0	44	
12	Viitorul Valea Mare	30	9	4	17	57	75	−18	31	
13	Minerul Costești	30	5	3	22	44	129	−85	18	
14	Minerul Ocnele Mari	30	5	2	23	33	92	−59	17 (Note: Minerul Ocnele Mari was excluded from the championship and lost all the remaining matches with 0–3.)	
15	Chimia 2012 Râmnicu Vâlcea	30	4	2	24	51	111	−60	14	
16	Crețeni	30	0	2	28	29	168	−139	2	

Rules for classification: 1) Points; 2) Head-to-head points; 3) Head-to-head goal difference; 4) Head-to-head goals scored; 5) Head-to-head away goals scored; 6) Goal difference; 7) Goals scored.
(Q) Qualified for the phase indicated

=== Vrancea County ===
==== Seria 1 ====
Pos	Team	Pld	W	D	L	GF	GA	GD	Pts	Qualification
1	Odobești (Q)	12	8	3	1	43	20	+23	27	Qualification to championship play-off
2	Șoimii Internațional Mircești (Q)	12	7	2	3	39	17	+22	23	Qualification to championship play-off
3	Voința Cârligele (Q)	12	7	2	3	30	19	+11	23	Qualification to championship play-off
4	Voința Răstoaca (Q)	12	6	2	4	31	19	+12	20	Qualification to championship play-off
5	Podgoria Cotești	12	4	0	8	19	40	−21	12	
6	Viitorul Biliești	12	3	1	8	18	33	−15	10	
7	Victoria Vânători	12	1	2	9	15	47	−32	5	

Rules for classification: 1) Points; 2) Head-to-head points; 3) Head-to-head goal difference; 4) Head-to-head goals scored; 5) Head-to-head away goals scored; 6) Goal difference; 7) Goals scored.
(Q) Qualified for the phase indicated

==== Seria 2 ====
Pos	Team	Pld	W	D	L	GF	GA	GD	Pts	Qualification
1	Euromania Dumbrăveni (Q)	12	10	1	1	67	6	+61	31	Qualification to championship play-off
2	Voința Slobozia Ciorăști	12	10	0	2	37	16	+21	30	Ineligible for promotion
3	Victoria Gugești (Q)	12	9	1	2	58	7	+51	28	Qualification to championship play-off
4	Dinamo Tătăranu	12	4	1	7	17	26	−9	13	
5	Tractorul Nănești	12	4	1	7	23	44	−21	13	
6	Unirea Milcovul	12	2	1	9	17	40	−23	7	
7	Suraia	12	0	1	11	6	86	−80	1	

Rules for classification: 1) Points; 2) Head-to-head points; 3) Head-to-head goal difference; 4) Head-to-head goals scored; 5) Head-to-head away goals scored; 6) Goal difference; 7) Goals scored.
(Q) Qualified for the phase indicated

==== Seria 3 ====
Pos	Team	Pld	W	D	L	GF	GA	GD	Pts	Qualification
1	Unirea Țifești (Q)	10	8	0	2	43	15	+28	24	Qualification to championship play-off
2	Adjud	10	7	1	2	50	18	+32	22	Ineligible for promotion
3	Voința Pufești (Q)	10	6	1	3	29	21	+8	19	Qualification to championship play-off
4	Trotusul Ruginești	10	6	0	4	26	27	−1	18	
5	Viitorul Homocea	10	2	0	8	19	43	−24	6	
6	Gloria Răcoasa	10	0	0	10	18	61	−43	0	

Rules for classification: 1) Points; 2) Head-to-head points; 3) Head-to-head goal difference; 4) Head-to-head goals scored; 5) Head-to-head away goals scored; 6) Goal difference; 7) Goals scored.
(Q) Qualified for the phase indicated

==== Group A ====
Pos	Team	Pld	W	D	L	GF	GA	GD	Pts	Qualification
1	Euromania Dumbrăveni (Q)	6	5	1	0	22	5	+17	16	Qualification to semi-finals
2	Voința Răstoaca (Q)	6	3	1	2	14	12	+2	10	Qualification to semi-finals
3	Voința Cârligele	6	2	0	4	7	17	−10	6	
4	Victoria Gugești	6	1	0	5	7	16	−9	3	

Rules for classification: 1) Points; 2) Head-to-head points; 3) Head-to-head goal difference; 4) Head-to-head goals scored; 5) Head-to-head away goals scored; 6) Goal difference; 7) Goals scored.
(Q) Qualified for the phase indicated

==== Group B ====
Pos	Team	Pld	W	D	L	GF	GA	GD	Pts	Qualification
1	Șoimii Internațional Mircești (Q)	6	4	2	0	22	12	+10	14	Qualification to semi-finals
2	Odobești (Q)	6	3	1	2	23	14	+9	10	Qualification to semi-finals
3	Unirea Țifești	6	2	1	3	13	11	+2	7	
4	Voința Pufești	6	1	0	5	11	32	−21	3	

Rules for classification: 1) Points; 2) Head-to-head points; 3) Head-to-head goal difference; 4) Head-to-head goals scored; 5) Head-to-head away goals scored; 6) Goal difference; 7) Goals scored.
(Q) Qualified for the phase indicated

===== Semi-finals =====
Team 1	Agg.	Team 2	1st leg	2nd leg
Odobești	2–5	Euromania Dumbrăveni	1–3	1–2
Voința Răstoaca	1–10	Șoimii Internațional Mircești	0–6	1–4

===== Final =====
Team 1	Agg.	Team 2	1st leg	2nd leg
Șoimii Internațional Mircești	3–9	Euromania Dumbrăveni	1–5	2–4

Euromania Dumbrăveni won the 2015–16 Liga IV Vrancea County and qualify to promotion play-off in Liga III.

== See also ==
- 2015–16 Liga I
- 2015–16 Liga II
- 2015–16 Liga III
