= Lucian Murgoci =

Romanian professional footballer

Personal information
- Date of birth: 25 March 1992 (age 34)
- Place of birth: Galați, Romania
- Height: 1.79 m (5 ft 10 in)
- Position: Left-back

Team information
- Current team: Avântul Valea Mărului
- Number: 17

Youth career
- Oțelul Galați

Senior career*
Years	Team	Apps	(Gls)
2008–2013	Oțelul II Galați	61	(4)
2012–2016	Oțelul Galați	42	(0)
2014	→ Metalul Reșița (loan)	12	(0)
2016	→ Farul Constanța (loan)	5	(0)
2016–2019	Euerbach/Kützberg	56	(2)
2020–	Avântul Valea Mărului	11	(1)

International career^{‡}
2011	Romania U19	3	(0)
- * Club domestic league appearances and goals as of 30 April 2021 ‡ National team caps and goals as of 26 July 2011

Lucian Murgoci (born 25 March 1992) is a Romanian professional footballer who plays as a left-back for Liga III side Avântul Valea Mărului. In his career Murgoci played for teams such as: Oțelul Galați, Farul Constanța or SV Euerbach/Kützberg, among others.
