= Romeo Buteseacă =

Romanian professional footballer

Personal information
- Full name: Romeo Alexandru Buteseacă
- Date of birth: 26 July 1978 (age 48)
- Place of birth: Galați, Romania
- Height: 1.75 m (5 ft 9 in)
- Position: Striker

Team information
- Current team: Avântul Valea Mărului
- Number: 42

Youth career
- Dunărea Galați

Senior career*
Years	Team	Apps	(Gls)
1997–1998	Dunărea Galați	16	(4)
1998–1999	Oțelul Galați	8	(0)
1999–2000	Cimentul Fieni	7	(0)
2001–2002	Jiul Petroșani	8	(1)
2002–2003	FC Vaslui	10	(0)
2004	Dunărea Galați		
2004–2005	Dacia Unirea Brăila	24	(9)
2005–2006	Gloria Buzău	26	(6)
2006–2008	CF Brăila		
2008–2009	Dunărea Galați		
2013–2016	Luceafărul Petrolul Schela	15	(2)
2016	Fulgerul Smulți	2	(0)
2016	Oțelul Galați	3	(4)
2016–2017	Metalosport Galați	2	(0)
2018–	Avântul Valea Mărului	29	(40)
- * Club domestic league appearances and goals as of 30 April 2021

Romeo Alexandru Buteseacă (born 26 July 1978) is a Romanian professional footballer who plays as a striker for Liga III side Avântul Valea Mărului. In his career Buteseacă played for teams such as: Dunărea Galați, Oțelul Galați, Dacia Unirea Brăila or Gloria Buzău, among others.
