= FC Argeș 1953 Pitești =

FC Argeș
- Full name: Fotbal Club Argeș 1953 Pitești
- Nickname(s): Vulturii violeți (Violet Eagles); Trupa din Trivale (Trivale Squad); Alb-Violeții (The White-Violets)
- Short name: FC Argeș
- Founded: 2013
- Dissolved: 2016
- Ground: Ştrand
- Capacity: 2,500
- Owner: FC Argeş Supporters Association
- 2015–16: Liga IV, Argeș County, 1st (promoted)
- Website: www.fcarges1953.ro
Home colours	Away colours

Fotbal Club Argeș 1953 Pitești was a Romanian football club from Pitești, Argeș. It was founded in 2013 as a phoenix club of the then-dissolved team FC Argeș Pitești, and was fully owned by its supporters.

== History ==
=== Liga IV Argeș County (2014–present) ===
After the dissolution of the original team FC Argeș Pitești, the supporters recreated the team and named it FC Argeș 1953, a phoenix club who started in Liga IV. In their first season they finished on the second place in Liga IV – Argeș County. In the same year they participated in the first ever Football without Owners Tournament, a new established trophy for the fan-owned phoenix clubs in Romania, the other participants was ASU Politehnica Timișoara, FC Vaslui 2002 and the host LSS Voința Sibiu, they finished on the third place at the event. On June 12, they managed to win against the county rivals Unirea Bascov to win the league and qualify in the promotion play-off to Liga III.

After the promotion the club was dissolved, not having enough financial support.

== Honours ==
=== Domestic ===
- Liga IV – Argeș County
  - Winners (1): 2015–16
  - Runners-up (1): 2014–15

=== Friendly ===
- Football without Owners Tournament
  - Third place (1): 2015

== Statistics ==
Season	Tier	League	Pos.	Notes
2015–16	4	Liga IV – Argeș County	1st (C, P)	
2014–15	4	Liga IV – Argeș County	2	
