= Cosmin Gârleanu =

Romanian footballer

Personal information
- Full name: Cosmin Andrei Gârleanu
- Date of birth: 7 February 1989 (age 37)
- Place of birth: Galaţi, Romania
- Position: Midfielder

Team information
- Current team: Avântul Valea Mărului
- Number: 20

Youth career
- Oțelul Galați

Senior career*
| Years | Team | Apps | (Gls) |
| 2007–2013 | Oțelul Galați | 3 | (0) |
| 2007 | → Brăila (loan) | ? | (?) |
| 2011 | → Petrolul Ploieşti (loan) | 6 | (1) |
| 2011–2012 | → Dunărea Galaţi (loan) | 3 | (1) |
| 2012–2013 | → Delta Tulcea (loan) | ? | (?) |
| 2013–2016 | Sporting Liești | ? | (?) |
| 2016– | Avântul Valea Mărului | ? | (?) |
- * Club domestic league appearances and goals as of 15 August 2017

Cosmin Gârleanu (born 7 February 1989 in Galaţi, Romania) is a Romanian footballer who plays for Liga III club Avântul Valea Mărului.
