= Stadionul Ștrand =

Multi-use stadium in Piteşti, Romania

- Location: Pitești, Romania
- Capacity: 2,500

Tenants
- FC Argeș (1953–1964); Internaţional Pitesti (2000–2009); Argeș 1953 Piteşti (2014–2016)

Ştrand Stadium is a multi-use stadium in Piteşti, Romania. It is currently used mostly for football matches. The stadium can host 2,500 people.
