= Alexandru Vlasie =

Romanian footballer

Personal information
- Full name: Alexandru Dionisie Vlasie
- Date of birth: 28 February 1990 (age 36)
- Place of birth: Galați, Romania
- Height: 1.87 m (6 ft 2 in)
- Position: Goalkeeper

Team information
- Current team: Foresta Șendreni
- Number: 28

Youth career
- Dunărea Galați

Senior career*
Years	Team	Apps	(Gls)
2010–2011	Dunărea Galați	1	(0)
2011–2012	Politehnica Galați		
2012–2014	Oțelul II Galați		
2014	Oțelul Galați	2	(0)
2015–2016	Delta Dobrogea Tulcea		
2015–2016	Metalosport Galați		
2016–2018	Oțelul Galați	0	(0)
2019	Oțelul Galați	2	(0)
2019–2021	Avântul Valea Mărului	4	(0)
2021–2022	Unirea Braniștea	0	(0)
2023–2024	Viitorul Ianca	2	(0)
2024–	Foresta Șendreni	0	(0)
- * Club domestic league appearances and goals as of 16:05, 28 December 2024 (UTC)

Alexandru Dionisie Vlasie (born 28 February 1990) is a Romanian professional footballer who plays as a goalkeeper for Foresta Șendreni.
