= Valea Mărului =

- Commune
- Coat of arms

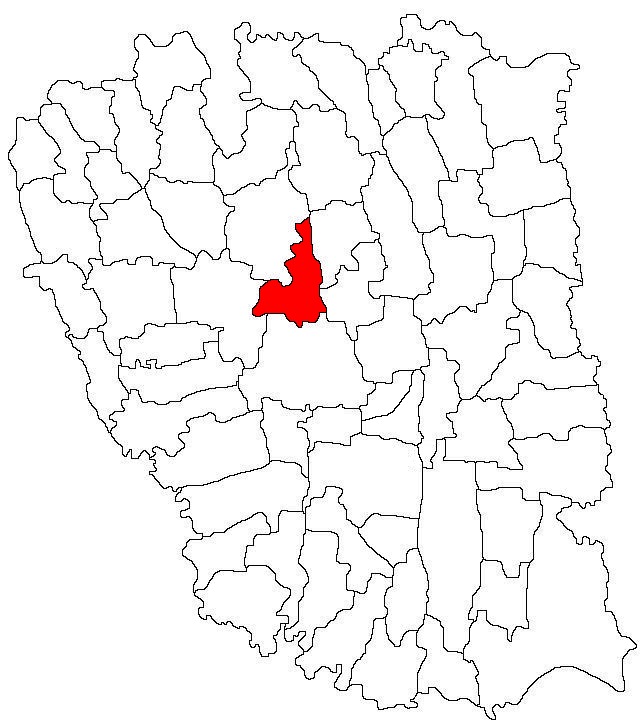
- Location in Galați County

- Location in Romania
- Coordinates: 45°51′N 27°41′E
- Country: Romania
- County: Galați

Government
  - Mayor (2024–2028): Virgil Doca (PSD)
- Area: 48.63 km^{2} (18.78 sq mi)
- Elevation: 99 m (325 ft)
- Population (2021-12-01): 3,572
  - Density: 73.45/km^{2} (190.2/sq mi)
- Time zone: UTC+02:00 (EET)
  - Summer (DST): UTC+03:00 (EEST)
- Postal code: 807320
- Area code: (+40) 0236
- Vehicle reg.: GL
- Website: primariavaleamarului.ro

Valea Mărului is a commune in Galați County, Western Moldavia, Romania with a population of 3,572 people as of 2021. It is composed of two villages, Mândrești and Valea Mărului.
