= Stadionul Dacia =

Stadionul Dacia may refer to:

- Stadionul Dacia (Mioveni)
- Stadionul Dacia (Orăştie)
