= 1990–91 Divizia C =

Third tier Romanian football league

Divizia C
- Season: 1990–91

The 1990–91 Divizia C was the 35th season of Liga III, the third tier of the Romanian football league system.

== Team changes ==
=== To Divizia C ===
Relegated from Divizia B

- CFR Pașcani
- CS Botoșani
- Viitorul Vaslui
- IMASA Sfântu Gheorghe
- Metalul Mija
- Constructorul Craiova
- Electromureș Târgu Mureș
- Mureșul Deva
- CFR Cluj
- Someșul Satu Mare

Promoted from County Championship

- Unirea Abrom Bârlad
- Rulmentul Alexandria
- Jiul IEELIF Craiova
- Steaua Târgoviște
- Minerul Bălan
- Minerul Uricani
- Prutul '90 Fălciu
- Victoria Călan
- Unirea Făurei
- Litoral Mangalia
- Cristalul Dorohoi
- Știința Băneasa
- Torpedo Zărnești
- Unirea Seini
- Electrometal Cluj-Napoca
- CFR Arad
- Minerul Berbești
- Armătura Strehaia
- Carpați Sinaia
- Metalurgistul Tecuci
- Unirea Urziceni
- Voința București
- Minerul Turț
- Fortuna Tulcea
- Voința Roman
- Metalul Buzău
- Mecanica Alba Iulia

=== From Divizia C ===
Promoted to Divizia B

- Fortus Iași
- Borzești
- Gloria CFR Galați
- Callatis Mangalia
- Progresul București
- Electroputere Craiova
- Șoimii IPA Sibiu
- Montana Sinaia
- Vulturii Lugoj
- Aurul Brad
- Metalurgistul Cugir
- CIL Sighetu Marmației

Relegated to County Championship

- Tepro Iași
- Electro Botoșani
- Metalul Sighișoara
- Oțelul Reghin
- Granitul Babadag
- Laminorul Brăila
- Voința Medgidia
- Victoria Țăndărei
- Rapid Braniștea
- ASIC București
- Spicul Coteana
- Carpați Brașov
- Carpați Nehoiu
- Petrolul Băicoi
- CSM Drobeta-Turnu Severin
- Mecanizatorul Șimian
- Voința Oradea
- Gloria Beiuș
- Energia Sebeș
- Sticla Arieșul Turda
- Minerul Crucea
- Laminorul Roman

=== Renamed teams ===
Metalul Rădăuți was renamed as Bucovina Rădăuți.

Unirea Abrom Bârlad was renamed as Unirea Bârlad.

Automecanica Reșița was renamed as Arsenal Reșița.

Progresul Medgidia was renamed as Progresul CSS Medgidia.

Laminorul Victoria Zalău was renamed as Laminorul Zalău.

Motorul IMA Arad was renamed as Motorul Arad.

CSU-Mecanica Sibiu was renamed as Mecanica Sibiu.

Mecano-sport Galați was renamed as Victoria Galați.

Chimica Buzău was renamed as Chimia Buzău.

Chimia Năsăud was renamed as Progresul Năsăud.

Energia Auto Timișoara was renamed as Energia Timișoara.

ASA Chimia Ploiești was renamed as Chimia Brazi Ploiești.

Unirea Poiana Câmpina was renamed as Electromotor Câmpina.

Steaua Târgoviște was renamed as Petrolul Târgoviște.

Constructorul Șoimii Craiova was renamed as SUCPI Craiova.

Constructorul Craiova was renamed as Constructorul TCI Craiova.

Victoria Fiut Carei was renamed as Victoria Carei.

Chimia Victoria Turnu Măgurele was renamed as Chimia Turnu Măgurele

=== Other changes ===
Dacia Orăștie merged with Dacia Mecanica Orăștie and changed its name to Metaloplastica Orăștie.

Carpați Mârșa became Textila Cisnădie.

== League tables ==
=== Seria I ===
Pos	Team	Pld	W	D	L	GF	GA	GD	Pts	Qualification or relegation
1	Relonul Săvinești (C, P)	28	19	4	5	53	19	+34	42	Promotion to Divizia B
2	CS Botoșani	28	17	6	5	56	23	+33	40	
3	CFR Pașcani	28	17	4	7	67	41	+26	38	
4	Bucovina Rădăuți	28	17	3	8	53	29	+24	37	
5	Constructorul Iași	28	15	2	11	44	32	+12	32	
6	Voința Roman	28	15	1	12	63	42	+21	31	
7	Explorări Câmpulung Moldovenesc	28	15	1	12	38	36	+2	31	
8	Minerul Gura Humorului	28	13	0	15	41	51	−10	26	
9	Steaua Minerul Vatra Dornei	28	10	3	15	45	49	−4	23	
10	Carpați Gălănești	28	10	3	15	32	47	−15	23	
11	Cristalul Dorohoi	28	10	2	16	41	44	−3	22	
12	Aurora Târgu Frumos	28	9	4	15	34	43	−9	22	
13	Metalul Roman	28	9	4	15	22	45	−23	22	
14	CSM Bucecea	28	9	2	17	33	56	−23	20	
15	Avântul Frasin (R)	28	5	1	22	13	78	−65	11	Relegation to County Championship
16	Zimbrul Siret (R)	0	0	0	0	0	0	0	0	Relegation to County Championship

Source: romaniansoccer.ro
Rules for classification: 1) Points; 2) Goal difference; 3) Number of goals scored.
(C) Champions; (P) Promoted; (R) Relegated

=== Seria II ===
Pos	Team	Pld	W	D	L	GF	GA	GD	Pts	Qualification or relegation
1	FEPA 74 Bârlad (C, P)	28	21	1	6	74	27	+47	43	Promotion to Divizia B
2	Textila Buhuși	28	17	3	8	70	27	+43	37	
3	Victoria Galați	28	18	1	9	74	35	+39	37	
4	Partizanul Bacău	28	16	1	11	58	32	+26	33	
5	Știința Navrom Galați	28	14	4	10	42	28	+14	32	
6	Metalurgistul Tecuci	28	15	1	12	53	45	+8	31	
7	Minerul Comănești	28	13	4	11	46	36	+10	30	
8	Steaua Mecanică Huși	28	15	0	13	53	45	+8	30	
9	Petrolul Moinești	28	12	2	14	35	44	−9	26	
10	Mecon Onești	28	12	1	15	50	50	0	25	
11	Mecanica Vaslui	28	10	3	15	52	46	+6	23	
12	Proletarul Bacău	28	10	2	16	35	61	−26	22	
13	Unirea Bârlad	28	10	1	17	38	82	−44	21	
14	Gloria Ivești	28	7	5	16	29	80	−51	19	
15	Unirea Negrești (R)	28	4	3	21	17	88	−71	11	Relegation to County Championship
16	Prutul '90 Fălciu (R)	0	0	0	0	0	0	0	0	Relegation to County Championship

Source: romaniansoccer.ro
Rules for classification: 1) Points; 2) Goal difference; 3) Number of goals scored.
(C) Champions; (P) Promoted; (R) Relegated

=== Seria III ===
Pos	Team	Pld	W	D	L	GF	GA	GD	Pts	Qualification or relegation
1	Petrolul Ianca Brăila (C, P)	28	19	4	5	78	20	+58	42	Promotion to Divizia B
2	Petrolul Berca	28	14	3	11	51	33	+18	31	
3	Hidrotehnica Buzău	28	14	2	12	51	37	+14	30	
4	Metalul Buzău	28	13	3	12	41	40	+1	29	
5	Chimia Brăila	28	12	4	12	43	44	−1	28	
6	IMASA Sfântu Gheorghe	28	13	1	14	48	42	+6	27	
7	Metalul Târgu Secuiesc	28	13	1	14	59	53	+6	27	
8	Foresta Gugești	28	13	1	14	47	42	+5	27	
9	Autobuzul Chimia Mărășești	28	12	3	13	40	60	−20	27	
10	Chimia Buzău	28	11	4	13	41	35	+6	26	
11	Celuloza Adjud	28	12	2	14	36	49	−13	26	
12	Unirea Făurei	28	12	2	14	46	74	−28	26	
13	Tricotex Panciu	28	11	4	13	31	70	−39	26	
14	Electro Sfântu Gheorghe	28	11	3	14	46	47	−1	25	
15	Minerul Baraolt (R)	28	11	1	16	34	46	−12	23	Relegation to County Championship
16	Carpați Covasna (R)	0	0	0	0	0	0	0	0	Relegation to County Championship

Source: romaniansoccer.ro
Rules for classification: 1) Points; 2) Goal difference; 3) Number of goals scored.
(C) Champions; (P) Promoted; (R) Relegated

=== Seria IV ===
Pos	Team	Pld	W	D	L	GF	GA	GD	Pts	Qualification or relegation
1	Portul Constanța (C, P)	26	18	5	3	78	19	+59	41	Promotion to Divizia B
2	Dunărea Romport Galați	26	16	5	5	52	17	+35	37	
3	Progresul CSS Medgidia	26	17	3	6	58	24	+34	37	
4	Victoria Lehliu	26	12	4	10	43	41	+2	28	
5	ISCIP Ulmeni	26	11	5	10	61	35	+26	27	
6	Șantierul Naval Oltenița	26	12	3	11	48	36	+12	27	
7	Conpref Constanța	26	12	1	13	35	39	−4	25	
8	Litoral Mangalia	26	9	6	11	44	43	+1	24	
9	Delta Tulcea	26	10	2	14	52	41	+11	22	
10	Unirea Urziceni	26	10	2	14	42	50	−8	22	
11	Rapid Fetești	26	8	5	13	37	54	−17	21	
12	Arrubium Măcin	26	9	3	14	29	58	−29	21	
13	Viitorul Chirnogi	26	8	3	15	40	51	−11	19	
14	Olimpia Slobozia	26	5	1	20	21	132	−111	11	
15	Progresul Isaccea (R)	0	0	0	0	0	0	0	0	Relegation to County Championship
16	Fortuna Tulcea (R)	0	0	0	0	0	0	0	0	Relegation to County Championship

Source: romaniansoccer.ro
Rules for classification: 1) Points; 2) Goal difference; 3) Number of goals scored.
(C) Champions; (P) Promoted; (R) Relegated

=== Seria V ===
Pos	Team	Pld	W	D	L	GF	GA	GD	Pts	Qualification or relegation
1	Metalul București (C, P)	28	20	5	3	83	28	+55	45	Promotion to Divizia B
2	IMGB București	28	20	3	5	73	24	+49	43	
3	Mecos București	28	12	4	12	51	44	+7	28	
4	Mecon București	28	12	4	12	41	40	+1	28	
5	Electrica Titu	28	12	3	13	53	47	+6	27	
6	Automatica București	28	12	2	14	39	34	+5	26	
7	Danubiana București	28	11	4	13	38	46	−8	26	
8	Tehnometal București	28	11	4	13	33	45	−12	26	
9	Victoria Giurgiu	28	12	2	14	28	55	−27	26	
10	IUPS Chitila	28	11	3	14	41	61	−20	25	
11	Voința București	28	9	6	13	48	45	+3	24	
12	Viscofil București	28	10	4	14	40	40	0	24	
13	Dunăreana Giurgiu	28	10	4	14	36	48	−12	24	
14	CFR BTA București	28	11	2	15	44	58	−14	24	
15	Avicola Crevedia (R)	28	11	2	15	39	72	−33	24	Relegation to County Championship
16	Știința Băneasa (R)	0	0	0	0	0	0	0	0	Relegation to County Championship

Source: romaniansoccer.ro
Rules for classification: 1) Points; 2) Goal difference; 3) Number of goals scored.
(C) Champions; (P) Promoted; (R) Relegated

=== Seria VI ===
Pos	Team	Pld	W	D	L	GF	GA	GD	Pts	Qualification or relegation
1	Metrom Brașov (C, P)	30	19	2	9	61	24	+37	40	Promotion to Divizia B
2	Metalul Plopeni	30	15	3	12	62	39	+23	33	
3	Victoria Florești	30	16	1	13	44	36	+8	33	
4	Torpedo Zărnești	30	15	3	12	45	43	+2	33	
5	Chimia Brazi Ploiești	30	15	2	13	43	36	+7	32	
6	Precizia Săcele	30	13	5	12	50	50	0	31	
7	Carpați Sinaia	30	14	3	13	52	53	−1	31	
8	Metalul Filipeștii de Pădure	30	14	2	14	40	37	+3	30	
9	Metalul Mija	30	14	2	14	49	49	0	30	
10	Minerul Filipeștii de Pădure	30	14	1	15	47	45	+2	29	
11	Nitramonia Făgăraș	30	13	3	14	41	45	−4	29	
12	Cimentul Fieni	30	13	2	15	45	45	0	28	
13	Chimia Găești	30	12	3	15	49	45	+4	27	
14	Petrolul Târgoviște	30	12	3	15	31	50	−19	27	
15	Minerul Șotânga (R)	30	12	3	15	32	60	−28	27	Relegation to County Championship
16	Electromotor Câmpina (R)	30	8	4	18	29	54	−25	20	Relegation to County Championship

Source: romaniansoccer.ro
Rules for classification: 1) Points; 2) Goal difference; 3) Number of goals scored.
(C) Champions; (P) Promoted; (R) Relegated

=== Seria VII ===
Pos	Team	Pld	W	D	L	GF	GA	GD	Pts	Qualification or relegation
1	Olt '90 Scornicești (C, P)	30	23	2	5	64	17	+47	48	Promotion to Divizia B
2	Unirea Alexandria	30	21	3	6	61	23	+38	45	
3	Dacia Pitești	30	15	5	10	53	27	+26	35	
4	Chimia Turnu Măgurele	30	15	4	11	51	37	+14	34	
5	ROVA Roșiori	30	13	6	11	45	35	+10	32	
6	Electronistul Curtea de Argeș	30	13	6	11	50	46	+4	32	
7	Muscelul Câmpulung	30	13	5	12	45	35	+10	31	
8	Dunărea Zimnicea	30	12	6	12	40	50	−10	30	
9	Unirea Pitești	30	13	2	15	45	38	+7	28	
10	Metalul Râmnicu Vâlcea	30	12	4	14	44	53	−9	28	
11	Viitorul Drăgășani	30	11	5	14	36	52	−16	27	
12	Rulmentul Alexandria	30	12	1	17	43	41	+2	25	
13	Recolta Stoicănești	30	12	1	17	43	72	−29	25	
14	Progresul Corabia	30	10	4	16	48	58	−10	24	
15	SM Drăgănești-Olt (R)	30	6	7	17	33	80	−47	19	Relegation to County Championship
16	IOB Balș (R)	31	5	7	19	19	56	−37	17	Relegation to County Championship

Source: romaniansoccer.ro
Rules for classification: 1) Points; 2) Goal difference; 3) Number of goals scored.
(C) Champions; (P) Promoted; (R) Relegated

=== Seria VIII ===
Pos	Team	Pld	W	D	L	GF	GA	GD	Pts	Qualification or relegation
1	Jiul IEELIF Craiova (C, P)	30	19	4	7	55	31	+24	42	Promotion to Divizia B
2	Minerul Uricani	30	17	3	10	53	30	+23	37	
3	Arsenal Reșița	30	16	4	10	64	35	+29	36	
4	Minerul Moldova Nouă	30	16	3	11	57	37	+20	35	
5	CSM Caransebeș	30	16	3	11	48	33	+15	35	
6	Minerul Berbești	30	17	1	12	35	43	−8	35	
7	SUCPI Craiova	30	13	6	11	55	49	+6	32	
8	Petrolul Stoina	30	14	4	12	46	49	−3	32	
9	Minerul Anina	30	13	3	14	57	45	+12	29	
10	Constructorul TCI Craiova	30	11	5	14	54	48	+6	27	
11	Petrolul Țicleni	30	11	5	14	35	40	−5	27	
12	Minerul Mătăsari	30	12	3	15	38	44	−6	27	
13	Dierna Orșova	30	11	4	15	39	55	−16	26	
14	Dacia Cozia Călimănești	30	11	3	16	50	57	−7	25	
15	Progresul Băilești (R)	30	11	3	16	44	53	−9	25	Relegation to County Championship
16	Armătura Strehaia (R)	30	4	1	25	13	94	−81	9	Relegation to County Championship

Source: romaniansoccer.ro
Rules for classification: 1) Points; 2) Goal difference; 3) Number of goals scored.
(C) Champions; (P) Promoted; (R) Relegated

=== Seria IX ===
Pos	Team	Pld	W	D	L	GF	GA	GD	Pts	Qualification or relegation
1	Electromureș Târgu Mureș (C, P)	30	19	5	6	82	31	+51	43	Promotion to Divizia B
2	Avântul Reghin	30	18	3	9	69	27	+42	39	
3	Mureșul Toplița	30	18	3	9	60	30	+30	39	
4	Progresul Odorheiu Secuiesc	30	15	4	11	49	37	+12	34	
5	Unirea Cristuru Secuiesc	30	14	2	14	47	55	−8	30	
6	Progresul Năsăud	30	13	3	14	39	52	−13	29	
7	Rapid Miercurea Ciuc	30	13	2	15	51	49	+2	28	
8	Mecanica Bistrița	30	13	2	15	44	50	−6	28	
9	Minerul Bălan	30	12	3	15	38	42	−4	27	
10	Mureșul Luduș	30	11	5	14	42	50	−8	27	
11	Cetatea Târgu Neamț	30	11	5	14	38	49	−11	27	
12	Laminorul Beclean	30	11	5	14	40	57	−17	27	
13	Metalotehnica Târgu Mureș	30	11	5	14	35	59	−24	27	
14	Viitorul Gheorgheni	30	13	0	17	52	58	−6	26	
15	Metalul Reghin (R)	30	10	5	15	28	52	−24	25	Relegation to County Championship
16	Textila Cisnădie (R)	30	11	2	17	36	52	−16	24	Relegation to County Championship

Source: romaniansoccer.ro
Rules for classification: 1) Points; 2) Goal difference; 3) Number of goals scored.
(C) Champions; (P) Promoted; (R) Relegated

=== Seria X ===
Pos	Team	Pld	W	D	L	GF	GA	GD	Pts	Qualification or relegation
1	Minerul Cavnic (C, P)	30	17	3	10	56	33	+23	37	Promotion to Divizia B
2	Someșul Satu Mare	30	16	2	12	59	42	+17	34	
3	Laminorul Zalău	30	14	5	11	46	32	+14	33	
4	Victoria Carei	30	14	5	11	51	39	+12	33	
5	Oașul Negrești-Oaș	30	14	5	11	39	45	−6	33	
6	CUPROM Baia Mare	30	13	4	13	48	37	+11	30	
7	Mobila Șimleu Silvaniei	30	14	2	14	55	48	+7	30	
8	Minerul Baia Sprie	30	15	0	15	42	37	+5	30	
9	Minerul Turț	30	14	2	14	41	48	−7	30	
10	Bradul Vișeu de Sus	30	14	2	14	42	54	−12	30	
11	Minerul Sărmășag	30	13	3	14	46	39	+7	29	
12	Minerul Baia Borșa	30	13	3	14	48	56	−8	29	
13	Voința Negrești-Oaș	30	13	3	14	42	53	−11	29	
14	Chimia Tășnad	30	12	3	15	45	49	−4	27	
15	Minerul Băița (R)	30	11	5	14	35	51	−16	27	Relegation to County Championship
16	Unirea Seini (R)	30	8	3	19	32	64	−32	19	Relegation to County Championship

Source: romaniansoccer.ro
Rules for classification: 1) Points; 2) Goal difference; 3) Number of goals scored.
(C) Champions; (P) Promoted; (R) Relegated

=== Seria XI ===
Pos	Team	Pld	W	D	L	GF	GA	GD	Pts	Qualification or relegation
1	CFR Cluj (C, P)	30	20	6	4	77	27	+50	46	Promotion to Divizia B
2	Metalul Aiud	30	16	5	9	44	29	+15	37	
3	Industria Sârmei Câmpia Turzii	30	15	4	11	48	25	+23	34	
4	Minerul Știința Vulcan	30	14	4	12	48	43	+5	32	
5	Minerul Lupeni	30	15	1	14	59	45	+14	31	
6	Paroșeni Vulcan	30	12	7	11	44	37	+7	31	
7	CFR Simeria	30	13	5	12	46	49	−3	31	
8	Soda Ocna Mureș	30	14	2	14	50	45	+5	30	
9	CUG Cluj-Napoca	30	13	4	13	36	39	−3	30	
10	Mecanica Alba Iulia	30	13	4	13	40	44	−4	30	
11	Mureșul Deva	30	11	7	12	45	44	+1	29	
12	Retezatul Hațeg	30	11	6	13	32	41	−9	28	
13	Unirea Dej	30	13	2	15	37	53	−16	28	
14	Carpați Agnita	30	12	4	14	51	67	−16	28	
15	Mecanica Sibiu (R)	30	9	6	15	36	52	−16	24	Relegation to County Championship
16	Electrometal Cluj-Napoca (R)	30	3	5	22	20	73	−53	11	Relegation to County Championship

Source: romaniansoccer.ro
Rules for classification: 1) Points; 2) Goal difference; 3) Number of goals scored.
(C) Champions; (P) Promoted; (R) Relegated

=== Seria XII ===
Pos	Team	Pld	W	D	L	GF	GA	GD	Pts	Qualification or relegation
1	UM Timișoara (C, P)	30	20	1	9	77	38	+39	41	Promotion to Divizia B
2	Oțelul Ștei	30	18	2	10	60	33	+27	38	
3	Motorul Arad	30	14	4	12	50	39	+11	32	
4	Unirea Tomnatic	30	14	4	12	55	65	−10	32	
5	Metaloplastica Orăștie	30	14	3	13	61	42	+19	31	
6	Înfrățirea Oradea	30	15	1	14	50	38	+12	31	
7	Șoimii Lipova	30	12	4	14	57	54	+3	28	
8	Energia Timișoara	30	13	2	15	45	43	+2	28	
9	Minerul Ștei	30	13	2	15	48	47	+1	28	
10	Unirea Sânnicolau Mare	30	13	2	15	46	56	−10	28	
11	AS Sânmartinu Sârbesc	30	14	0	16	62	74	−12	28	
12	Victoria Călan	30	12	4	14	38	52	−14	28	
13	Ceramica Jimbolia	30	13	2	15	48	63	−15	28	
14	Petrolul Arad	30	13	1	16	50	58	−8	27	
15	Strungul Chișineu-Criș (R)	30	11	5	14	39	70	−31	27	Relegation to County Championship
16	CFR Arad (R)	30	10	5	15	31	50	−19	25	Relegation to County Championship

Source: romaniansoccer.ro
Rules for classification: 1) Points; 2) Goal difference; 3) Number of goals scored.
(C) Champions; (P) Promoted; (R) Relegated

== See also ==
- 1990–91 Divizia A
- 1990–91 Divizia B
- 1990–91 Cupa României
