= CSM Dacia Orăștie =

Romanian football club

Dacia Orăștie
- Full name: Club Sportiv Municipal; Dacia Orăștie 2010
- Nicknames: Dacii (The Dacians); Alb-albaștrii (The White-Blues)
- Short name: Dacia
- Founded: 1935; 91 years ago as Energia Orăștie
- Ground: Dacia
- Capacity: 978
- Owner: Orăștie Municipality
- Chairman: Marius Ștefan
- Manager: Florin Barbu
- League: Liga IV
- 2025–26: Liga IV, Hunedoara, 9th of 11
Home colours	Away colours

Club Sportiv Municipal Dacia Orăștie 2010, commonly known as Dacia Orăștie, is a Romanian football club based in Orăștie, Hunedoara County and currently playing in the Liga IV – Hunedoara County, the fourth tier of the Romanian football league system. Dacia Orăștie played seven seasons in second division and fifteen seasons in third division.

== History ==
The club was founded in 1935 as Energia Orăștie by workers from the city's chemical factory and initially competed in the Hunedoara Regional Championships. Later renamed Flacăra Orăștie, the team earned promotion to Divizia C after winning the 1955 Hunedoara Regional Championship.

In the 1956 third division season, Flacăra secured a 5th-place finish in Series IV. However, in the following season, a 13th-place finish resulted in relegation to the fourth division.

Over the next fifteen years, the club remained active in regional and county championships and adopted the name Dacia Orăștie. During this period, notable achievements included finishing as runners-up in 1958–59, securing 3rd place in 1959–60, and again 3rd place in Series II of the 1960–61 season. The club also placed 3rd in Series II of the 1967–68 season, narrowly missing promotion by just one point behind Aurul Brad, and another 3rd place finish in the 1970–71 season of the County Championship.

In the 1971–72 season, Dacia won the Hunedoara County Championship after topping the Valea Mureșului Series and defeating Parângul Lonea, the Valea Jiului Series winner, in the championship final (2–2 on aggregate and 4–3 on penalties). This earned a spot in the promotion play-off for Divizia C, but promotion was missed following losses to CIL Blaj (0–5 at Blaj and 2–0 at Orăștie), the winner of Alba County Championship.

Promotion was achieved the following season after again winning the Valea Mureșului Series and defeating Minerul Vulcan, the Valea Jiului Series winner, in the county championship final (0–0 at Petroșani and 5–0 at Simeria). Coached by Remus Prodan, the squad featured players such as P. Catană, I. Andea, Adrian Crișan, Sergiu Albu, Anghel, C. Răsădeanu, Verejan, Iulian Bolovan, Teodor Hopîrteanu, A. Matache, A. Dimeni, and Duțu, among others.

Returning to third division, the White and Blues, under head coach Teodor Pop, finished as runners-up in Series VIII of the 1973–74 season, just two points behind Minerul Moldova Nouă. Also, Dacia reached the Round of 32 in the Cupa României, but suffered a 0–5 defeat against first division team Sportul Studențesc. The squad included players such as Dan Vasilcin, Tiberiu Haidu, I. Andea, C. Nenu, S. Albu, Ad. Crișan, Avram Sava, Ghenu, Iordan Pînteceanu, T. Hopîrteanu, Iosif Sereș, Marin Faur, Haidău, I. Bolovan, Gelu Dărăban, A. Matache, Grigore Macavei, Ion Macavei, Duțu, C. Răsădeanu, Vasile Radu, and A. Dimeni.

In the 1974–75 season, Dacia Orăștie, led by Benone Popa, achieved promotion to the second division after winning the Series XI of Divizia C, finishing three points ahead of Olimpia Oradea and 15 points clear of Voința Oradea in 3rd. The squad that earned promotion included players such as D. Vasilcin, T. Haidu, Nicolae Fogoroși, S. Albu, Ad. Crișan, Constantin Puiu, G. Dărăban, A. Sava, I. Sereș, I. Pînteceanu, T. Hopîrteanu, Gh. Costea, Nicolae Davidescu, Viorel Puie, I. Bolovan, Gr. Macavei, I. Macavei, Nicolae Stanciu, V. Radu, M. Faur, Ionel Stanca, Augustin Pălincaș, and Viorel Darie.

Dacia Orăștie played seven consecutive seasons in Series III of Divizia B, the club’s longest spell in the second tier of Romanian football. The debut campaign ended with a respectable 11th-place finish under the guidance of Constantin Ștefan. The following seasons proved more difficult as the White and Blues finished the 1976–77 and 1977–78 seasons in 14th place, narrowly avoiding relegation. A slight improvement came in 1978–79, with a 13th-place finish, but the team slipped back to 14th place in both 1979–80 and 1980–81. In 1981–82, Dacia ended the season in 15th place, which resulted in relegation to Divizia C, bringing their seven-year run at this level to a close.

Back in Divizia C, Dacia Orăștie achieved a respectable 3rd place in Series IX during the 1982–83 season. However, performance declined over the next few years, with 8th place in Series VIII in 1983–84, followed by 11th place in Series IX in 1984–85. A last-place finish in the 1985–86 season ultimately led to relegation to the fourth division.

Dacia returned to the third division at the end of the 1988–89 season, after winning the Hunedoara County Championship and the promotion play-off against Avântul Baia de Fier (5–1 and 1–2), the Mehedinți County champions. In the 1989–90 Divizia C season, Dacia finished as runners-up in Series X, tied on points with Aurul Brad.

During this period, another local team, Mecanica Orăștie, began to rise. Backed by the town’s Mechanical Enterprise, Mecanica was promoted from the Hunedoara County Championship in 1983 and reached Divizia B in 1985, before being relegated to Divizia C in 1989. In 1990, the two clubs merged to form Metaloplastica Orăștie, which finished 5th in Series XII of Divizia C during the 1990–91 season, but was administratively relegated by the Romanian Football Federation. Metaloplastica won the 1991–92 Hunedoara County Championship, but finished 2nd in Group IX of the promotion play-off, thus missing promotion.

In 2016, after a year of inactivity, the club re-enrolled in Liga V – Hunedoara County, the fifth tier, and earned promotion to the fourth division after finishing 1st in the 2016–17 season.

== Honours ==
Liga III

- Winners (1): 1974–75
- Runners-up (2): 1973–74, 1989–90

Liga IV – Hunedoara County

- Winners (7): 1971–72, 1972–73, 1988–89, 1991–92, 1995–96, 2005–06, 2007–08

Liga V – Hunedoara County

- Winners (1): 2016–17

Hunedoara Regional Championship

- Winners (1): 1955

== Former managers ==
- (Romania) Constantin Ștefan (1975–1976)
