= 1955 Regional Championship =

14th season of the Liga IV, the fourth tier of the Romanian football league

Liga IV
- Season: 1955

The 1955 Regional Championship was the 14th season of the Regional Championship, the fourth tier of the Romanian football league system.

The promotion play-off did not take place this season, as Divizia C was re-established from the next season and the top teams from each Regional Championships were promoted to the 1956 Divizia C.

== Regional championships ==
- Arad (AR)
- Bacău (BC)
- Baia Mare (BM)
- Bârlad (BD)
- Bucharest Municipality (B)
- Bucharest Region (B)
- Cluj (CJ)
- Constanța (CT)
- Craiova (CR)
- Galați (GL)
- Hunedoara (HD)
- Iași (IS)
- Mureș (MS)
- Oradea (OR)
- Pitești (PI)
- Ploiești (PL)
- Stalin (ST)
- Suceava (SV)
- Timișoara (TM)

== Championship standings ==
=== Arad Region ===
Pos	Team	Pld	W	D	L	GF	GA	GAv	Pts	Qualification or relegation
1	Constructorul Arad (C, P)	26	21	3	2	76	24	3.167	45	Promotion to Divizia C
2	Flamura Roșie 7 Noiembrie Arad (P)	26	18	5	3	66	18	3.667	41	Promotion to Divizia C
3	Voința Artex Arad	26	15	4	7	54	22	2.455	34	
4	Recolta Pecica	26	14	2	10	38	39	0.974	30	
5	Progresul Arad	26	12	4	10	41	43	0.953	28	
6	Progresul Sânnicolau Mare	26	12	3	11	49	45	1.089	27	
7	Flamura Roșie FZ Arad	26	10	4	12	41	44	0.932	24	
8	Recolta Sânnicolau Mare	26	10	3	13	39	56	0.696	23	
9	Recolta Grabați	26	9	3	14	46	53	0.868	21	
10	Progresul Ineu	26	7	7	12	30	41	0.732	21	
11	Știința Arad	26	8	4	14	38	51	0.745	20	
12	Recolta Șiria	26	8	3	15	38	61	0.623	19	
13	Recolta Zăbrani	26	5	6	15	32	57	0.561	16	
14	Avântul Sebiș	26	6	3	17	26	60	0.433	15	

Rules for classification: 1) points; 2) goal difference; 3) number of goals scored.
(C) Champions; (P) Promoted

=== Bacău Region ===
Pos	Team	Pld	W	D	L	GF	GA	GAv	Pts	Qualification or relegation
1	Avântul Piatra Neamț (C, P)	21	17	2	2	73	8	9.125	36	Promotion to Divizia C
2	Flacăra Moinești (P)	21	17	2	2	83	12	6.917	36	Promotion to Divizia C
3	Avântul Steaua Roșie Bacău	21	15	2	4	44	24	1.833	32	
4	Flamura Roșie Piatra Neamț	21	11	1	9	38	28	1.357	23	
5	Minerul Comănești	21	10	2	9	30	30	1.000	22	
6	Flacăra Dărmănești	21	9	1	11	37	45	0.822	19	
7	Locomotiva Târgu Ocna	21	6	6	9	26	34	0.765	18	
8	Avântul Târgu Neamț	21	6	2	13	24	51	0.471	14	
9	Recolta Bodești	21	5	2	14	25	55	0.455	12	
10	Avântul Roznov	21	4	4	13	19	67	0.284	12	
11	Dinamo Târgu Ocna	21	3	2	16	8	56	0.143	8	
12	Constructorul Onești (Note: Constructorul Onești withdrew after the first half of the season.) (D)	11	1	2	8	8	23	0.348	4	Excluded

Rules for classification: 1) points; 2) goal difference; 3) number of goals scored.
(C) Champions; (D) Disqualified; (P) Promoted

=== Baia Mare Region ===
Pos	Team	Pld	W	D	L	GF	GA	GAv	Pts	Qualification or relegation
1	Recolta Carei (C, Q)	26	23	1	2	102	13	7.846	47	Promotion to Divizia C
2	Avântul Sighetu Marmației (P)	26	22	1	3	88	25	3.520	45	Promotion to Divizia C
3	Voința Sighetu Marmației	26	12	7	7	44	33	1.333	31	
4	Metalul 1 Mai Baia Mare	26	12	6	8	62	45	1.378	30	
5	Metalul Unio Satu Mare	26	11	5	10	53	50	1.060	27	
6	Dinamo Sighetu Marmației	26	9	6	11	39	37	1.054	24	
7	Voința Carei	26	11	2	13	55	55	1.000	24	
8	Metalul Baia Mare II	26	8	8	10	46	49	0.939	24	
9	Progresul Vișeu de Sus	26	7	8	11	30	38	0.789	22	
10	Avântul Bixad	26	9	4	13	39	58	0.672	22	
11	Voința Baia Mare	26	8	5	13	29	61	0.475	21	
12	Avântul Vișeu de Sus	26	7	5	14	32	42	0.762	19	
13	Metalul Józsa Béla	26	6	3	17	34	82	0.415	15	
14	Recolta Tășnad	26	4	5	17	26	91	0.286	13	

Rules for classification: 1) points; 2) goal difference; 3) number of goals scored.
(C) Champions; (P) Promoted; (Q) Qualified for the phase indicated

=== Bucharest Region ===
Series I

Pos	Team	Pld	W	D	L	GF	GA	GAv	Pts	Qualification or relegation
1	Flamura Roșie BR București (C, P)	26	17	3	6	49	31	1.581	37	Promotion to Divizia C
2	Progresul Călărași (P)	26	16	4	6	62	23	2.696	36	Promotion to Divizia C
3	Metalul Boleslav Bierut București	26	15	5	6	53	28	1.893	35	
4	Progresul ITB București	26	14	6	6	56	29	1.931	34	
5	Flamura Roșie FRB București	26	12	4	10	61	45	1.356	28	
6	Metalul Oltenița	26	12	4	10	55	43	1.279	28	
7	Flacăra București	26	11	4	11	28	32	0.875	26	
8	Locomotiva Giurgiu	26	10	5	11	53	51	1.039	25	
9	Viscofil București	26	10	5	11	45	48	0.938	25	
10	Recolta Negoești	26	7	7	12	38	51	0.745	21	
11	Aprozar București	26	7	7	12	37	52	0.712	21	
12	Recolta Lehliu	26	9	2	15	33	60	0.550	20	
13	Progresul Slobozia	26	5	8	13	31	55	0.564	18	
14	Progresul Răcari	26	3	3	20	25	79	0.316	9	

Rules for classification: 1) points; 2) goal difference; 3) number of goals scored.
(C) Champions; (P) Promoted

Series II

Pos	Team	Pld	W	D	L	GF	GA	GAv	Pts	Qualification or relegation
1	Locomotiva MCF București (C, P)	26	17	6	3	70	28	2.500	40	Promotion to Divizia C
2	Flamura Roșie Giurgiu (P)	26	17	5	4	91	30	3.033	39	Promotion to Divizia C
3	Armata București	26	14	6	6	71	35	2.029	34	
4	Metalul Electromagnetica București	26	15	4	7	57	30	1.900	34	
5	Gheorghe Gheorghiu-Dej București	26	13	4	9	62	48	1.292	30	
6	Bere Grivița București	26	13	4	9	50	41	1.220	30	
7	Abatorul București	25	12	6	7	54	48	1.125	30	
8	Flamura Roșie Roșiori	26	10	5	11	44	52	0.846	25	
9	Progresul Turnu Măgurele	25	7	9	9	41	49	0.837	23	
10	Progresul Alexandria	26	8	4	14	55	75	0.733	20	
11	Locomotiva Roșiori	26	8	2	16	34	75	0.453	18	
12	CM Roșiori	26	6	5	15	36	55	0.655	17	
13	Dinamo Buftea	26	5	2	19	24	63	0.381	12	
14	Metalul Clement Gottwald București	26	4	3	19	35	95	0.368	11	

Rules for classification: 1) points; 2) goal difference; 3) number of goals scored.
(C) Champions; (P) Promoted

=== Constanța Region ===
Pos	Team	Pld	W	D	L	GF	GA	GAv	Pts	Qualification or relegation
1	Metalul SNC Constanța (C, P)	26	21	1	4	79	21	3.762	43	Promotion to Divizia C
2	Constructorul Constanța (P)	26	18	4	4	74	23	3.217	40	Promotion to Divizia C
3	Metalul IMU Medgidia	26	17	5	4	74	23	3.217	39	
4	Flamura Roșie Constanța	25	17	3	5	69	24	2.875	37	
5	Constructorul Medgidia	26	12	5	9	41	34	1.206	29	
6	Constructorul Cernavodă	26	13	2	11	43	57	0.754	28	
7	Locomotiva Fetești	25	10	6	9	45	37	1.216	26	
8	Locomotiva CFR Constanța	25	11	6	8	51	35	1.457	28	
9	Recolta Fetești	26	9	7	10	36	50	0.720	25	
10	Dinamo Constanța	26	10	3	13	34	56	0.607	23	
11	Recolta Negru Vodă	26	6	3	17	32	71	0.451	15	
12	Progresul Babadag	24	3	4	17	25	66	0.379	10	
13	Flacăra Constanța (Note: Flacăra Constanța and Victoria Basarabi were excluded after 17 and 16 matches, respectively, due to repeated no-shows and lost their remaining matches 0–3.)	26	3	4	19	26	69	0.377	10	
14	Victoria Basarabi	26	0	1	25	6	83	0.072	1	

Rules for classification: 1) points; 2) goal difference; 3) number of goals scored.
(C) Champions; (P) Promoted

=== Hunedoara Region ===
Pos	Team	Pld	W	D	L	GF	GA	GAv	Pts	Qualification or relegation
1	Flacăra 14 Orăștie (C, P)	24	17	4	3	63	21	3.000	38	Promotion to Divizia C
2	Locomotiva Simeria (P)	24	15	7	2	71	25	2.840	37	Promotion to Divizia C
3	Avântul Sebeș	24	16	3	5	75	24	3.125	35	
4	Metalul Brad	24	12	6	6	43	23	1.870	30	
5	Metalul Ghelari	24	10	7	7	28	32	0.875	27	
6	Flamura Roșie Alba Iulia	24	8	9	7	43	29	1.483	25	
7	Metalul Zlatna	24	11	3	10	38	42	0.905	25	
8	Minerul Lonea	24	10	1	13	36	42	0.857	21	
9	Progresul Deva	24	7	5	12	33	54	0.611	19	
10	Flamura Roșie Lupeni	24	6	5	13	37	54	0.685	17	
11	Locomotiva Alba Iulia	24	7	1	16	30	63	0.476	15	
12	Metalul Călan	24	5	3	16	29	63	0.460	13	
13	Constructorul Hunedoara	24	4	2	18	21	68	0.309	10	

Rules for classification: 1) points; 2) goal difference; 3) number of goals scored.
(C) Champions; (P) Promoted

=== Pitești Region ===
Pos	Team	Pld	W	D	L	GF	GA	GAv	Pts	Qualification or relegation
1	Dinamo Pitești (C, P)	26	21	4	1	70	12	5.833	46	Promotion to Divizia C
2	Flamura Roșie Râmnicu Vâlcea (P)	25	19	4	2	81	15	5.400	42	Promotion to Divizia C
3	Progresul Găești	25	16	3	6	68	22	3.091	35	
4	Minerul Câmpulung	26	12	7	7	52	29	1.793	31	
5	Flamura Roșie Pitești	26	12	5	9	37	34	1.088	29	
6	Metalul IMS Câmpulung	26	11	6	9	49	33	1.485	28	
7	Oltul Râmnicu Vâlcea	26	9	6	11	37	42	0.881	24	
8	Progresul Câmpulung	26	10	3	13	43	67	0.642	23	
9	Progresul Drăgășani	26	6	7	13	33	68	0.485	19	
10	Flamura Roșie Curtea de Argeș	26	7	5	14	26	55	0.473	19	
11	Constructorul Râmnicu Vâlcea	26	7	4	15	35	52	0.673	18	
12	Voința Pitești	26	6	6	14	32	60	0.533	18	
13	Locomotiva Pitești	26	7	3	16	27	42	0.643	17	
14	Flacăra Leordeni	26	6	1	19	26	85	0.306	13	

Rules for classification: 1) points; 2) goal difference; 3) number of goals scored.
(C) Champions; (P) Promoted

=== Ploiești Region ===
Pos	Team	Pld	W	D	L	GF	GA	GAv	Pts	Qualification or relegation
1	Flacăra Târgoviște (C, P)	26	21	1	4	88	22	4.000	43	Promotion to Divizia C
2	Metalul Sinaia (P)	26	16	3	7	67	41	1.634	35	Promotion to Divizia C
3	Metalul 113 Plopeni	26	13	7	6	65	39	1.667	33	
4	Flacăra Băicoi	26	14	5	7	44	28	1.571	33	
5	Flacăra Câmpina	26	13	5	8	54	34	1.588	31	
6	Locomotiva Buzău	26	13	4	9	49	32	1.531	30	
7	Flacăra Boldești	26	13	1	12	43	71	0.606	27	
8	Flacăra Ochiuri	26	10	6	10	51	46	1.109	26	
9	Metalul 135 Mija	26	9	6	11	49	37	1.324	24	
10	Flacăra Uzina Ploiești	26	8	5	13	50	57	0.877	21	
11	Constructorul Fieni	26	8	5	13	40	54	0.741	21	
12	Constructorul Feroemail Ploiești	26	4	7	15	28	72	0.389	15	
13	Avântul Bușteni	26	5	3	18	25	73	0.342	13	
14	Flamura Roșie Râmnicu Sărat	26	3	6	17	27	74	0.365	12	

Rules for classification: 1) points; 2) goal difference; 3) number of goals scored.
(C) Champions; (P) Promoted

== See also ==
- 1955 Divizia A
- 1955 Divizia B
- 1955 Cupa României
