= 1956 Divizia C =

Third tier Romanian football league

Divizia C
- Season: 1956

The 1956 Divizia C was the 5th season of Liga III, the third tier of the Romanian football league system. This was the first Divizia C season held after a seven-year break. The competition brought together thirteen teams relegated from the previous Divizia B season and thirty-eight others that had qualified through the regional championships. The teams were divided into four geographical series.

At the end of the season, Recolta Fălticeni in Series I, Locomotiva MCF București in Series II, Energia Baia Mare in Series III, and Energia Metalul Arad in Series IV. topped their respective series and secured promotion to the 1957–58 Divizia B.

== Team changes ==
=== To Divizia C ===
Relegated from Divizia B

- Flamura Roșie Sfântu Gheorghe
- Locomotiva Craiova
- Știința Craiova
- Metalul București
- Flamura Roșie Cluj
- Metalul Baia Mare
- Metalul Oradea
- Metalul 108 Cugir
- Metalul Arad
- Flamura Roșie Buhuși
- Avântul Fălticeni
- Dinamo Galați
- Locomotiva Galați

Promoted from Regional Championship

- Progresul Rădăuți
- Dinamo Dorohoi
- Progresul Iași
- Locomotiva Pașcani
- Avântul Piatra Neamț
- Flacăra Moinești
- Victoria Tecuci
- Voința Tecuci
- Metalul Brăila
- Știința Galați
- Metalul Constanța
- Constructorul Constanța
- Flamura Roșie Giurgiu
- Progresul Călărași
- Locomotiva MCF București
- Flamura Roșie București
- Flacăra Târgoviște
- Energia Sinaia
- Dinamo Pitești
- Flamura Roșie Râmnicu Vâlcea
- Energia Târnăveni
- Energia Tohan
- Dinamo Târgu Mureș
- Recolta Toplița
- Progresul Turda
- Energia Turda
- Locomotiva Oradea
- Recolta Salonta
- Recolta Sighetu Marmației
- Recolta Carei
- Energia Craiova
- Progresul Corabia
- Progresul Timișoara
- Energia Oțelu Roșu
- Constructorul Arad
- Flamura Roșie 7 Noiembrie Arad
- Flacăra 14 Orăștie
- Locomotiva Simeria

=== Renamed teams ===
Avântul Piatra Neamț was renamed Recolta Piatra Neamț.

Metalul București was renamed Energia București.

Metalul Baia Mare was renamed Energia Baia Mare.

Metalul 108 Cugir was renamed Energia Cugir.

Avântul Fălticeni was renamed Recolta Fălticeni.

Flacăra 14 Orăștie was renamed Energia Orăștie.

Flacăra Târgoviște was renamed Energia Târgoviște.

Metalul Sinaia was renamed Energia Sinaia.

Flacăra Moinești was renamed Energia Moinești.

Metalul Brăila was renamed Energia Brăila.

Metalul Oradea was renamed Energia Oradea.

== League tables ==
=== Seria I ===
Pos	Team	Pld	W	D	L	GF	GA	GD	Pts	Qualification or relegation
1	Recolta Fălticeni (C, P)	22	16	3	3	58	22	+36	35	Promotion to Divizia B
2	Locomotiva Pașcani	22	16	2	4	53	23	+30	34	
3	Flamura Roșie Buhuși	22	13	6	3	51	27	+24	32	
4	Victoria Tecuci	22	10	6	6	43	30	+13	26	
5	Știința Galați	22	10	3	9	34	28	+6	23	
6	Dinamo Galați	22	9	3	10	42	33	+9	21	
7	Dinamo Dorohoi	22	7	4	11	38	43	−5	18	
8	Energia Moinești	22	8	2	12	35	43	−8	18	
9	Progresul Iași	22	5	7	10	28	41	−13	17	
10	Progresul Rădăuți	22	5	7	10	32	49	−17	17	
11	Recolta Piatra Neamț (R)	22	5	6	11	33	54	−21	16	Relegation to Regional Championship
12	Voința Tecuci (R)	22	2	3	17	13	67	−54	7	Relegation to Regional Championship

Source: romaniansoccer.ro
Rules for classification: 1) Points; 2) Goal difference; 3) Number of goals scored.
(C) Champions; (P) Promoted; (R) Relegated

=== Seria II ===
Pos	Team	Pld	W	D	L	GF	GA	GD	Pts	Qualification or relegation
1	Locomotiva MCF București (C, P)	26	18	4	4	71	23	+48	40	Promotion to Divizia B
2	Energia Târgoviște	26	17	3	6	58	33	+25	37	
3	Locomotiva Galați	26	14	5	7	35	26	+9	33	
4	Progresul Corabia	26	11	7	8	31	29	+2	29	
5	Energia Tohan	26	12	3	11	57	56	+1	27	
6	Flamura Roșie Giurgiu	26	11	5	10	39	42	−3	27	
7	Energia Sinaia	26	10	6	10	45	38	+7	26	
8	Dinamo Pitești	26	9	7	10	38	29	+9	25	
9	Energia București	26	9	6	11	42	38	+4	24	
10	Metalul Constanța	26	10	4	12	39	35	+4	24	
11	Energia Brăila	26	10	4	12	39	44	−5	24	
12	Constructorul Constanța (R)	26	8	4	14	47	65	−18	20	Relegation to Regional Championship
13	Flamura Roșie București (R)	26	7	3	16	34	67	−33	17	Relegation to Regional Championship
14	Progresul Călărași (R)	26	2	7	17	16	66	−50	11	Relegation to Regional Championship

Source: romaniansoccer.ro
Rules for classification: 1) Points; 2) Goal difference; 3) Number of goals scored.
(C) Champions; (P) Promoted; (R) Relegated

=== Seria III ===
Pos	Team	Pld	W	D	L	GF	GA	GD	Pts	Qualification or relegation
1	Energia Baia Mare (C, P)	24	16	3	5	55	26	+29	35	Promotion to Divizia B
2	Dinamo Târgu Mureș	24	13	5	6	53	34	+19	31	
3	Recolta Toplița	24	12	4	8	28	30	−2	28	
4	Flamura Roșie Cluj	24	11	4	9	47	30	+17	26	
5	Flamura Roșie Sfântu Gheorghe	24	11	4	9	40	27	+13	26	
6	Energia Târnăveni	24	11	3	10	43	44	−1	25	
7	Progresul Turda	24	8	7	9	32	37	−5	23	
8	Recolta Sighetu Marmației	24	8	6	10	33	42	−9	22	
9	Energia Oradea	24	8	5	11	30	44	−14	21	
10	Recolta Carei	24	7	6	11	29	33	−4	20	
11	Recolta Salonta	24	5	10	9	23	27	−4	20	
12	Energia Turda (R)	24	8	2	14	37	52	−15	18	Relegation to Regional Championship
13	Locomotiva Oradea (R)	24	7	3	14	16	40	−24	17	Relegation to Regional Championship

Source: romaniansoccer.ro
Rules for classification: 1) Points; 2) Goal difference; 3) Number of goals scored.
(C) Champions; (P) Promoted; (R) Relegated

=== Seria IV ===
Pos	Team	Pld	W	D	L	GF	GA	GD	Pts	Qualification or relegation
1	Energia Metalul Arad (C, P)	22	14	4	4	39	17	+22	32	Promotion to Divizia B
2	Flamura Roșie Râmnicu Vâlcea	22	11	5	6	49	22	+27	27	
3	Știința Craiova	22	11	5	6	26	14	+12	27	
4	Energia Oțelu Roșu	22	10	5	7	32	33	−1	25	
5	Energia Orăștie	22	8	8	6	25	25	0	24	
6	Flamura Roșie 7 Noiembrie Arad	22	11	1	10	35	38	−3	23	
7	Locomotiva Craiova	22	8	5	9	34	42	−8	21	
8	Energia Cugir	22	8	5	9	21	26	−5	21	
9	Constructorul Arad	22	5	8	9	22	29	−7	18	
10	Energia Craiova	22	6	4	12	24	34	−10	16	
11	Progresul Timișoara (R)	22	6	4	12	20	36	−16	16	Relegation to Regional Championship
12	Locomotiva Simeria (R)	22	5	4	13	24	35	−11	14	Relegation to Regional Championship

Source: romaniansoccer.ro
Rules for classification: 1) Points; 2) Goal difference; 3) Number of goals scored.
(C) Champions; (P) Promoted; (R) Relegated

== See also ==
- 1956 Divizia A
- 1956 Divizia B
- 1956 Regional Championship
- 1956 Cupa României
