= 1991–92 County Championship =

50th season of the Liga IV, the fourth tier of the Romanian football league

Liga IV
- Season: 1991–92

The 1991–92 County Championship was the 50th season of the Liga IV, the fourth tier of the Romanian football league system. Due to the reorganization of the competitive system, only fourteen teams were promoted to the third tier.

The champions of each county association were divided into fourteen groups of three teams, and the winner of each group were promoted to 1992–93 Divizia C.

== County championships ==
- Alba (AB)
- Arad (AR)
- Argeș (AG)
- Bacău (BC)
- Bihor (BH)
- Bistrița-Năsăud (BN)
- Botoșani (BT)
- Brașov (BV)
- Brăila (BR)
- Bucharest (B)
- Buzău (BZ)
- Caraș-Severin (CS)
- Călărași (CL)
- Cluj (CJ)
- Constanța (CT)
- Covasna (CV)
- Dâmbovița (DB)
- Dolj (DJ)
- Galați (GL)
- Giurgiu (GR)
- Gorj (GJ)
- Harghita (HR)
- Hunedoara (HD)
- Ialomița (IL)
- Iași (IS)
- Maramureș (MM)
- Mehedinți (MH)
- Mureș (MS)
- Neamț (NT)
- Olt (OT)
- Prahova (PH)
- Satu Mare (SM)
- Sălaj (SJ)
- Sibiu (SB)
- Suceava (SV)
- Teleorman (TR)
- Timiș (TM)
- Tulcea (TL)
- Vaslui (VS)
- Vâlcea (VL)
- Vrancea (VN)

== Promotion play-off ==
The matches were scheduled to be played between 14 June and 1 July 1992.

=== Group 1 ===
Table

Pos	Team	Pld	W	D	L	GF	GA	GD	Pts	Promotion
1	Agrojim Dângeni (BT) (P)	4	2	1	1	6	5	+1	5	Promotion to Divizia C
2	CSȘ Roman (NT)	4	1	2	1	8	8	0	4	
3	Metalul Podu Iloaiei (IS)	4	1	1	2	6	7	−1	3	

Rules for classification: 1) Points; 2) Goal difference; 3) Number of goals scored.
(P) Promoted

Results

14 June 1992	Agrojim Dângeni	3–2	CSȘ Roman

17 June 1992	CSȘ Roman	3–2	Metalul Podu Iloaiei

21 June 1992	Metalul Podu Iloaiei	2–0	Agrojim Dângeni

24 June 1992	CSȘ Roman	1–1	Agrojim Dângeni

28 June 1992	Metalul Podu Iloaiei	2–2	CSȘ Roman

1 July 1992	Agrojim Dângeni	2–0	Metalul Podu Iloaiei

=== Group 2 ===
Table

Pos	Team	Pld	W	D	L	GF	GA	GD	Pts	Promotion
1	Voința Petrobrad Asău (BC) (P)	4	2	2	0	17	3	+14	6	Promotion to Divizia C
2	Hidraulica Galați (GL)	4	1	2	1	2	9	−7	4	
3	Victoria Muntenii de Jos (VS)	4	0	2	2	4	11	−7	2	

Rules for classification: 1) Points; 2) Goal difference; 3) Number of goals scored.
(P) Promoted

Results

14 June 1992	Victoria Muntenii de Jos	0–0	Hidraulica Galați

17 June 1992	Hidraulica Galați	0–0	Voința Petrobrad Asău

21 June 1992	Voința Petrobrad Asău	6–0	Victoria Muntenii de Jos

24 June 1992	Hidraulica Galați	2–1	Victoria Muntenii de Jos

28 June 1992	Voința Petrobrad Asău	8–0	Hidraulica Galați

1 July 1992	Victoria Muntenii de Jos	3–3	Voința Petrobrad Asău

=== Group 3 ===
Table

Pos	Team	Pld	W	D	L	GF	GA	GD	Pts	Promotion
1	Laminorul Brăila (BR) (P)	4	3	0	1	8	7	+1	6	Promotion to Divizia C
2	ASA Babadag (TL)	4	2	0	2	9	6	+3	4	
3	Energia Vulturu (VN)	4	1	0	3	5	9	−4	2	

Rules for classification: 1) Points; 2) Goal difference; 3) Number of goals scored.
(P) Promoted

Results

14 June 1992	Laminorul Brăila	2–1	ASA Babadag

17 June 1992	ASA Babadag	4–0	Energia Vulturu

21 June 1992	Energia Vulturu	1–3	Laminorul Brăila

24 June 1992	ASA Babadag	4–1	Laminorul Brăila

28 June 1992	Energia Vulturu	3–0	ASA Babadag

1 July 1992	Laminorul Brăila	2–1	Energia Vulturu

=== Group 4 ===
Table

Pos	Team	Pld	W	D	L	GF	GA	GD	Pts	Promotion
1	Cimentul Medgidia (CT) (P)	4	4	0	0	19	0	+19	8	Promotion to Divizia C
2	Unirea Mănăstirea (CL)	4	2	0	2	8	7	+1	4	
3	Flacăra Mihail Kogălniceanu (IL)	4	0	0	4	2	22	−20	0	

Rules for classification: 1) Points; 2) Goal difference; 3) Number of goals scored.
(P) Promoted

Results

14 June 1992	Cimentul Medgidia	7–0	Flacăra Mihail Kogălniceanu

17 June 1992	Flacăra Mihail Kogălniceanu	2–5	Unirea Mănăstirea

21 June 1992	Unirea Mănăstirea	0–2	Cimentul Medgidia

24 June 1992	Flacăra Mihail Kogălniceanu	0–7	Cimentul Medgidia

28 June 1992	Unirea Mănăstirea	3–0	Flacăra Mihail Kogălniceanu

1 July 1992	Cimentul Medgidia	3–0	Unirea Mănăstirea

=== Group 5 ===
Pos	Team	Pld	W	D	L	GF	GA	GD	Pts	Promotion
1	Astra Ploiești (PH) (P)	4	4	0	0	16	1	+15	8	Promotion to Divizia C
2	Avântul Catalina (CV)	4	1	0	3	3	10	−7	2	
3	Cristalul Buzău (BZ)	4	1	0	3	7	15	−8	2	

Rules for classification: 1) Points; 2) Goal difference; 3) Number of goals scored.
(P) Promoted

Results

14 June 1992	Astra Ploiești	3–0	Avântul Catalina

17 June 1992	Avântul Catalina	2–1	Cristalul Buzău

21 June 1992	Cristalul Buzău	0–5	Astra Ploiești

24 June 1992	Avântul Catalina	0–1	Astra Ploiești

28 June 1992	Cristalul Buzău	5–1	Avântul Catalina

1 July 1992	Astra Ploiești	7–1	Cristalul Buzău

=== Group 6 ===
Table

Pos	Team	Pld	W	D	L	GF	GA	GD	Pts	Promotion
1	Constructorul Feroviar București (B) (P)	3	3	0	0	18	1	+17	6	Promotion to Divizia C
2	Rodchim Găești (DB)	3	2	0	1	12	6	+6	4	
3	Inter Ciorogârla (IF)	4	0	0	4	2	25	−23	0	

Rules for classification: 1) Points; 2) Goal difference; 3) Number of goals scored.
(P) Promoted

Results

14 June 1992	Rodchim Găești	2–1	Inter Ciorogârla

17 June 1992	Inter Ciorogârla	0–3	Constructorul Feroviar București

21 June 1992	Constructorul Feroviar București	5–0	Rodchim Găești

1 July 1992	Constructorul Feroviar București	10–1	Inter Ciorogârla

4 July 1992	Inter Ciorogârla	0–10	Rodchim Găești

July 1992	Rodchim Găești	–	Constructorul Feroviar București

=== Group 7 ===
Table

Pos	Team	Pld	W	D	L	GF	GA	GD	Pts	Promotion
1	Rapid Braniștea (GR) (P)	4	3	0	1	5	4	+1	6	Promotion to Divizia C
2	Viitorul INC Costești (AG)	4	2	0	2	5	5	0	4	
3	Metalul Alexandria (TR)	4	1	0	3	4	5	−1	2	

Rules for classification: 1) Points; 2) Goal difference; 3) Number of goals scored.
(P) Promoted

Results

14 June 1992	Rapid Braniștea	0–2	Viitorul INC Costești

17 June 1992	Viitorul INC Costești	2–1	Metalul Alexandria

21 June 1992	Metalul Alexandria	1–2	Rapid Braniștea

24 June 1992	Viitorul INC Costești	1–2	Rapid Braniștea

28 June 1992	Metalul Alexandria	2–0	Viitorul INC Costești

1 July 1992	Rapid Braniștea	1–0	Metalul Alexandria

=== Group 8 ===
Pos	Team	Pld	W	D	L	GF	GA	GD	Pts	Promotion
1	IOB Balș (OT) (P)	4	3	0	1	9	4	+5	6	Promotion to Divizia C
2	Dunărea Calafat (DJ)	4	2	0	2	5	6	−1	4	
3	Autobuzul Drăgașani (VL)	4	1	0	3	5	9	−4	2	

Rules for classification: 1) Points; 2) Goal difference; 3) Number of goals scored.
(P) Promoted

Results

14 June 1992	Dunărea Calafat	2–0	Autobuzul Drăgașani

17 June 1992	Autobuzul Drăgașani	2–3	IOB Balș

21 June 1992	IOB Balș	3–1	Dunărea Calafat

24 June 1992	Autobuzul Drăgașani	3–1	Dunărea Calafat

28 June 1992	IOB Balș	3–0	Autobuzul Drăgașani

1 July 1992	Dunărea Calafat	1–0	IOB Balș

=== Group 9 ===
Table

Pos	Team	Pld	W	D	L	GF	GA	GD	Pts	Promotion
1	Metalurgistul Sadu (GJ) (P)	4	3	0	1	19	6	+13	6	Promotion to Divizia C
2	Metaloplastica Orăștie (HD)	4	3	0	1	14	2	+12	6	
3	Termo Drobeta-Turnu Severin (MH)	4	0	0	4	2	27	−25	0	

Rules for classification: 1) Points; 2) Goal difference; 3) Number of goals scored.
(P) Promoted

Results

14 June 1992	Metalurgistul Sadu	1–0	Metaloplastica Orăștie

17 June 1992	Metaloplastica Orăștie	7–1	Termo Drobeta-Turnu Severin

21 June 1992	Termo Drobeta-Turnu Severin	1–7	Metalurgistul Sadu

24 June 1992	Metaloplastica Orăștie	5–0	Metalurgistul Sadu

28 June 1992	Metalurgistul Sadu	11–0	Termo Drobeta-Turnu Severin

1 July 1992	Termo Drobeta-Turnu Severin	0–2	Metaloplastica Orăștie

=== Group 10 ===
Table

Pos	Team	Pld	W	D	L	GF	GA	GD	Pts	Promotion
1	Venus Lugoj (TM) (P)	4	3	0	1	11	2	+9	6	Promotion to Divizia C
2	Minerul Oravița (CS)	4	2	1	1	7	5	+2	5	
3	Șoimii Pâncota (AR)	4	0	1	3	2	13	−11	1	

Rules for classification: 1) Points; 2) Goal difference; 3) Number of goals scored.
(P) Promoted

Results

14 June 1992	Șoimii Pâncota	0–0	Minerul Oravița

17 June 1992	Minerul Oravița	2–1	Venus Lugoj

21 June 1992	Venus Lugoj	6–0	Șoimii Pâncota

24 June 1992	Minerul Oravița	5–2	Șoimii Pâncota

28 June 1992	Venus Lugoj	2–0	Minerul Oravița

1 July 1992	Șoimii Pâncota	0–2	Venus Lugoj

=== Group 11 ===
Table

Pos	Team	Pld	W	D	L	GF	GA	GD	Pts	Promotion
1	Dermata Cluj-Napoca (CJ) (P)	4	3	1	0	12	4	+8	7	Promotion to Divizia C
2	Minaur Zlatna (AB)	4	1	1	2	4	7	−3	3	
3	Textila Cisnădie (SB)	4	1	0	3	5	10	−5	2	

Rules for classification: 1) Points; 2) Goal difference; 3) Number of goals scored.
(P) Promoted

Results

14 June 1992	Textila Cisnădie	1–2	Dermata Cluj-Napoca

17 June 1992	Dermata Cluj-Napoca	0–0	Minaur Zlatna

21 June 1992	Minaur Zlatna	2–0	Textila Cisnădie

24 June 1992	Dermata Cluj-Napoca	6–1	Textila Cisnădie

28 June 1992	Minaur Zlatna	2–4	Dermata Cluj-Napoca

1 July 1992	Textila Cisnădie	3–0	Minaur Zlatna

=== Group 12 ===
Table

Pos	Team	Pld	W	D	L	GF	GA	GD	Pts	Promotion
1	Minerul Voivozi (BH) (P)	4	3	1	0	10	3	+7	7	Promotion to Divizia C
2	Minerul Ip (SJ)	4	0	2	2	2	7	−5	2	
3	Samus Satu Mare (SM)	4	1	1	2	8	10	−2	3	

Rules for classification: 1) Points; 2) Goal difference; 3) Number of goals scored.
(P) Promoted

Results

14 June 1992	Minerul Ip	0–0	Minerul Voivozi

17 June 1992	Minerul Voivozi	5–1	Samus Satu Mare

21 June 1992	Samus Satu Mare	3–0	Minerul Ip

24 June 1992	Minerul Voivozi	2–0	Minerul Ip

28 June 1992	Samus Satu Mare	2–3	Minerul Voivozi

1 July 1992	Minerul Ip	2–2	Samus Satu Mare

=== Group 13 ===
Table

Pos	Team	Pld	W	D	L	GF	GA	GD	Pts	Promotion
1	Viitorul Ocna Șugatag (MM) (P)	3	3	0	0	7	1	+6	6	Promotion to Divizia C
2	Bucovina AMG Suceava (SV)	3	1	0	2	7	8	−1	2	
3	Vișinul Măgheruș (BN)	4	1	0	3	7	12	−5	2	

Rules for classification: 1) Points; 2) Goal difference; 3) Number of goals scored.
(P) Promoted

Results

14 June 1992	Viitorul Ocna Șugatag	3–0	Vișinul Măgheruș

17 June 1992	Vișinul Măgheruș	4–1	Bucovina AMG Suceava

21 June 1992	Bucovina AMG Suceava	0–2	Viitorul Ocna Șugatag

24 June 1992	Vișinul Măgheruș	1–2	Viitorul Ocna Șugatag

28 June 1992	Bucovina AMG Suceava	6–2	Vișinul Măgheruș

1 July 1992	Viitorul Ocna Șugatag	–	Bucovina AMG Suceava

=== Group 14 ===
Table

Pos	Team	Pld	W	D	L	GF	GA	GD	Pts	Promotion
1	Măgura Codlea (BV) (P)	4	3	0	1	20	8	+12	6	Promotion to Divizia C
2	Merum Reghin (MS)	4	3	0	1	13	4	+9	6	
3	Complexul Gălăuțaș (HR)	4	0	0	4	5	26	−21	0	

Rules for classification: 1) Points; 2) Goal difference; 3) Number of goals scored.
(P) Promoted

Results

14 June 1992	Complexul Gălăuțaș	1–3	Merum Reghin

17 June 1992	Merum Reghin	2–0	Măgura Codlea

21 June 1992	Măgura Codlea	10–2	Complexul Gălăuțaș

24 June 1992	Merum Reghin	6–0	Complexul Gălăuțaș

28 June 1992	Măgura Codlea	3–2	Merum Reghin

1 July 1992	Complexul Gălăuțaș	2–7	Măgura Codlea

== Championships standings ==
=== Arad County ===
Series A

Pos	Team	Pld	W	D	L	GF	GA	GD	Pts	Qualification or relegation
1	Aurul Negru Pecica (Q)	30	22	3	5	122	25	+97	47	Qualification to tie-breaker
2	Olimpia ISD Arad	30	21	5	4	115	27	+88	45 (Note: Olimpia ISD Arad and Victoria Nădlac were deducted 2 points.)	Qualification to tie-breaker
3	CFR Arad	30	19	4	7	84	29	+55	42	
4	ICRTI Arad	30	15	7	8	48	36	+12	37	
5	Mureșul Zădăreni	30	16	1	13	76	44	+32	33	
6	Unirea Șofronea	30	15	3	12	94	59	+35	33	
7	Victoria Nădlac	30	17	1	12	84	71	+13	33	
8	Stăruința Dorobanți	30	13	5	12	54	43	+11	31	
9	Victoria Felnac	30	14	3	13	62	65	−3	31	
10	Înfrățirea Iratoșu	30	13	4	13	73	53	+20	30	
11	Agronomia Șagu	30	12	5	13	60	64	−4	29	
12	Tricoul Roșu Arad	30	10	3	17	51	68	−17	23	
13	Unirea Șeitin	30	9	3	18	44	127	−83	21	
14	Fulgerul Arad	30	7	4	19	42	108	−66	18	
15	Podgoria Ghioroc	30	8	0	22	45	99	−54	16	
16	Foresta Sânpetru German (R)	30	3	1	26	23	159	−136	7	Relegation to Arad County Championship II

Rules for classification: 1) Points; 2) Goal difference; 3) Number of goals scored.
(Q) Qualified for the phase indicated; (R) Relegated
Notes:

Series A tie-breaker

Aurul Negru Pecica and Olimpia ISD Arad played a play-off match in order to determine the winner of Series A of the Arad County Championship. The match tie-breaker was played on 2 June 1992 at Francisc von Neuman Stadium in Arad.

Team 1	Score	Team 2
Aurul Negru Pecica	6–1	Olimpia ISD Arad

Series B

Pos	Team	Pld	W	D	L	GF	GA	GD	Pts	Qualification or relegation
1	Șoimii Pâncota (Q)	28	20	2	6	79	21	+58	42	Qualification to championship final
2	Gloria Arad	28	19	4	5	61	29	+32	42	
3	Crișana Sebiș	28	20	3	5	103	35	+68	41 (Note: Crișana Sebiș deducted 2 points.)	
4	Strungul Ineu	28	19	2	7	87	38	+49	40	
5	Frontiera Curtici	28	15	4	9	81	42	+39	34	
6	Victoria Ineu	28	13	7	8	52	62	−10	33	
7	Blănarul Arad	28	14	4	10	87	46	+41	32	
8	Voința Macea	28	10	4	14	52	68	−16	24	
9	Avântul Târnova	28	10	3	15	41	83	−42	23	
10	Vulturii Socodor	28	9	3	16	46	72	−26	21	
11	Șoimii Șimand	28	7	6	15	49	48	+1	20	
12	Tractorul Satu Nou	28	8	4	16	42	71	−29	20	
13	Unirea CFR Gurahonț	28	6	7	15	41	106	−65	19	
14	Șiriana Șiria	28	7	2	19	50	86	−36	16	
15	Vânătorul Vânători	28	5	1	22	31	95	−64	11	
16	Unirea Sântana (D)	0	0	0	0	0	0	0	0 (Note: Unirea Sântana withdrew after nine rounds and all its results were canceled.)	Withdrew

Rules for classification: 1) Points; 2) Goal difference; 3) Number of goals scored.
(D) Disqualified; (Q) Qualified for the phase indicated
Notes:

Championship final

The matches was played on 4 and 7 June 1992.

Team 1	Agg.	Team 2	1st leg	2nd leg
Aurul Negru Pecica	1–3	Șoimii Pâncota	1–2	0–1

Șoimii Pâncota won the Arad County Championship and qualify to promotion play-off in Divizia C.

=== Caraș-Severin County ===
Pos	Team	Pld	W	D	L	GF	GA	GD	Pts	Qualification or relegation
1	Minerul Oravița (C, Q)	34	27	3	4	123	26	+97	57	Qualification to promotion play-off
2	Metalul Oțelul Roșu	34	27	2	5	124	24	+100	56	
3	Foresta Caransebeș	34	23	3	8	78	26	+52	49	
4	CFR Caransebeș	34	23	2	9	84	36	+48	48	
5	ICM CSM Reșița	34	20	3	11	67	36	+31	43	
6	Minerul Nera Bozovici	34	20	1	13	77	47	+30	41	
7	Metalul Topleț	34	17	5	12	56	42	+14	39	
8	Muncitorul Reșița	33	17	4	12	85	43	+42	38	
9	Foresta Zăvoi	34	16	6	12	66	54	+12	38	
10	Hercules Băile Herculane	34	17	1	16	73	70	+3	35	
11	Comerțul Moldova Nouă	34	15	4	15	65	81	−16	34	
12	Energia Poiana Mărului	34	13	2	19	74	68	+6	28	
13	Bistra Glimboca	34	11	4	19	59	95	−36	26	
14	Autoforesta Bocșa	34	10	5	19	40	74	−34	25	
15	Voința Oțelu Roșu	34	7	4	23	36	115	−79	18	
16	Speranța Caransebeș	33	8	1	24	55	135	−80	17	
17	Minerul Ocna de Fier	34	4	1	29	14	114	−100	9	
18	Spartac Reșița	34	3	1	30	20	116	−96	7	

Rules for classification: 1) Points; 2) Goal difference; 3) Number of goals scored.
(C) Champions; (Q) Qualified for the phase indicated

=== Harghita County ===
Pos	Team	Pld	W	D	L	GF	GA	GD	Pts	Qualification or relegation
1	Complexul Gălăuțaș (C, Q)	22	19	1	2	88	15	+73	39	Qualification to promotion play-off
2	Metalul Vlăhița	22	19	0	3	91	14	+77	38	
3	Mureșul Toplița	22	11	2	9	46	40	+6	24	
4	Beclean Odorheiu Secuiesc	22	9	4	9	48	42	+6	22	
5	Bastionul Lăzarea	22	9	4	9	46	52	−6	22	
6	Bradul Ciceu	22	8	5	9	38	48	−10	21	
7	Făgetul Borsec	22	10	0	12	40	51	−11	20	
8	Străduința Praid	22	8	2	12	33	50	−17	18	
9	Unirea Hodoșa	22	8	1	13	45	57	−12	17	
10	Viață Nouă Remetea	22	7	3	12	43	77	−34	17	
11	Unirea Lueta	22	7	2	13	33	68	−35	16	
12	Minerul Tulgheș	22	3	4	15	23	60	−37	10	

Rules for classification: 1) Points; 2) Goal difference; 3) Number of goals scored.
(C) Champions; (Q) Qualified for the phase indicated

=== Hunedoara County ===
Pos	Team	Pld	W	D	L	GF	GA	GD	Pts	Qualification or relegation
1	Metaloplastica Orăștie (C, Q)	26	22	2	2	113	28	+85	46	Qualification to promotion play-off
2	Minerul Certej	26	17	4	5	100	35	+65	38	
3	Constructorul Hunedoara	26	15	5	6	85	32	+53	35	
4	Minerul Aninoasa	26	15	5	6	69	33	+36	35	
5	Minerul Ghelari	26	14	2	10	56	47	+9	30	
6	Minerul Valea Brazi	26	13	3	10	50	38	+12	29	
7	Minerul Bărbăteni	26	13	1	12	46	56	−10	27	
8	Metalul Crișcior	26	10	4	12	60	60	0	24	
9	Jiul Petrila	26	9	3	14	50	59	−9	21	
10	Minerul Teliuc	26	9	3	14	37	53	−16	21	
11	Favior Orăștie	26	9	3	14	40	76	−36	21	
12	Utilajul Petroșani	26	7	2	17	42	87	−45	16	
13	EGCL Călan	26	5	2	19	37	79	−42	12	
14	Tractorul Bărăști	26	4	1	21	33	135	−102	9	

Rules for classification: 1) points; 2) goal difference; 3) number of goals scored.
(C) Champions; (Q) Qualified for the phase indicated

=== Mureș County ===
Pos	Team	Pld	W	D	L	GF	GA	GD	Pts	Qualification or relegation
1	Merum Reghin (C, Q)	32	23	4	5	94	29	+65	50	Qualification to promotion play-off
2	Sticla Târnaveni	32	23	4	5	87	23	+64	50	
3	Victoria Sărățeni	32	19	7	6	66	25	+41	45	
4	Gaz Metan Târgu Mureș	32	20	5	7	69	31	+38	45	
5	ILEFOR ASA Târgu Mureș	32	18	6	8	75	39	+36	42	
6	ISECO Târgu Mureș	32	17	7	8	66	39	+27	41	
7	Berea Reghin	32	16	2	14	75	55	+20	33 (Note: Berea Reghin deducted 1 point.)	
8	Transcorind Târgu Mureș	32	13	6	13	64	38	+26	32	
9	Voința Miercurea Nirajului	32	14	3	15	49	45	+4	31	
10	Energia Iernut	32	14	4	14	54	61	−7	29 (Note: Energia Iernut deducted 3 points.)	
11	Lacul Ursu Mobila Sovata	32	13	1	18	47	76	−29	27	
12	IMATEX Târgu Mureș	32	8	6	18	34	65	−31	22	
13	Metalul Sighișoara	32	9	5	18	50	62	−12	21 (Note: Metalul Sighișoara, Voința Sărmașu and Gaz Metan Daneș were deducted 2 points.)	
14	Voința Sărmașu	32	10	2	20	54	109	−55	20	
15	Gaz Metan Daneș	32	9	3	20	45	97	−52	19	
16	Piscicola Zau	32	6	8	18	46	89	−43	16 (Note: Piscicola Zau deducted 4 points.)	
17	Voința Sângeorgiu de Pădure	32	3	1	28	21	113	−92	7	

Rules for classification: 1) Points; 2) Goal difference; 3) Number of goals scored.
(C) Champions; (Q) Qualified for the phase indicated

=== Neamț County ===
Pos	Team	Pld	W	D	L	GF	GA	GD	Pts	Qualification or relegation
1	CSȘ Roman (C, Q)	26	22	0	4	99	18	+81	44	Qualification to promotion play-off
2	Cimentul Bicaz	26	19	1	6	95	24	+71	39	
3	Bradul Roznov	26	19	1	6	72	37	+35	39	
4	Celuloza ITA Piatra Neamț	26	16	3	7	64	29	+35	35	
5	Azochim Săvinești	26	14	5	7	50	40	+10	33	
6	Șoimii Piatra Șoimului	26	11	1	14	54	57	−3	23	
7	Energia Săbăoani	26	12	1	13	43	58	−15	23 (Note: Energia Săbăoani, Spicul Tămășeni, Vulturul Zănești and Avântul Cordun were deducted 2 points.)	
8	Viitorul Podoleni	26	10	3	13	53	72	−19	23	
9	Spicul Tămășeni	26	12	0	14	61	68	−7	22	
10	Vulturul Zănești	26	10	3	13	50	59	−9	21	
11	IM Piatra Neamț	26	5	6	15	26	67	−41	15 (Note: IM Piatra Neamț deducted 1 point.)	
12	Voința Piatra Neamț	26	7	0	19	35	63	−28	14	
13	Rapid Piatra Neamț	26	5	2	19	29	74	−45	12	
14	Avântul Cordun	26	6	2	18	33	98	−65	12	

Rules for classification: 1) Points; 2) Goal difference; 3) Number of goals scored.
(C) Champions; (Q) Qualified for the phase indicated

== See also ==
- 1991–92 Divizia A
- 1991–92 Divizia B
- 1991–92 Cupa României
