= 1955 Divizia B =

16th season of the Divizia B, the second tier of the Romanian football league

Divizia B
- Season: 1955
- Promoted: Locomotiva GR București; Progresul Oradea; Dinamo Bacău
- Relegated: Flamura Roșie Sfântu Gheorghe; Flamura Roșie Cluj; Flamura Roșie Buhuși; Locomotiva Craiova; Metalul Baia Mare; Avântul Fălticeni; Știința Craiova; Metalul Oradea; Dinamo Galați; Metalul București; Metalul 108 Cugir; Locomotiva Galați; Metalul Arad

The 1955 Divizia B was the 16th season of the second tier of the Romanian football league system. This was the sixth season played in the spring-autumn system, a system imposed by the new leadership of the country which were in close ties with the Soviet Union.

The format has been maintained to three series, one of them having 14 teams and two of them only 13. At the end of the season the winners of the series promoted to Divizia A, the last four places from the first and third series and the last five places from the second series relegated to Divizia C.

== Team changes ==
=== To Divizia B ===
Relegated from Divizia A

- Metalul Hunedoara
- Locomotiva GR București
- Metalul Câmpia Turzii
- Progresul Oradea

Promoted from Regional Championship

- Avântul Fălticeni
- Locomotiva Galați
- Metalul 108 Cugir
- Metalul Arad
- Știința București
- Știința Craiova

=== From Divizia B ===
Promoted to Divizia A

- Progresul FB București
- Avântul Reghin
- Locomotiva Constanța

Relegated to Regional Championship

- Flacăra Pitești
- Constructorul Arad
- Locomotiva Pașcani
- Locomotiva Oradea
- Constructorul Craiova
- Metalul Brăila

=== Other changes ===
- Metalul Câmpina was renamed Flacăra Câmpina.
- Metalul Ploiești was renamed Flacăra 1 Mai Ploiești.
- Spartac Burdujeni was renamed Flamura Roșie Burdujeni.
- Spartac Focșani was renamed Progresul Focșani.
- Voința București was renamed Progresul CPCS București.

== League tables ==
=== Series I ===
Pos	Team	Pld	W	D	L	GF	GA	GD	Pts	Promotion or relegation
1	Locomotiva GR București (C, P)	24	18	3	3	69	21	+48	39	Promotion to Divizia A
2	Progresul Sibiu	24	13	4	7	28	20	+8	30	
3	Metalul Tractorul	24	11	4	9	32	25	+7	26	
4	Locomotiva Turnu Severin	24	12	2	10	40	32	+8	26	
5	Dinamo 6 București	24	10	6	8	35	29	+6	26	
6	Știința București	24	10	4	10	32	32	0	24	
7	Flacăra Moreni	24	11	1	12	32	36	−4	23	
8	Progresul CPCS București	24	10	2	12	44	43	+1	22	
9	Metalul Steagul Roșu	24	9	4	11	30	30	0	22	
10	Flamura Roșie Sfântu Gheorghe (R)	24	10	2	12	22	27	−5	22	Relegation to Divizia C
11	Locomotiva Craiova (R)	24	9	4	11	19	38	−19	22	Relegation to Divizia C
12	Știința Craiova (R)	24	6	6	12	21	33	−12	18	Relegation to Divizia C
13	Metalul București (R)	24	5	2	17	27	65	−38	12	Relegation to Divizia C

Source: romaniansoccer.ro
Rules for classification: 1) Points 2) Head-to-head points; 3) Head-to-head goal difference; 4) Head-to-head goals scored; 5) Head-to-head away goals scored; 6) Goal difference; 7) Goals scored.
(C) Champions; (P) Promoted; (R) Relegated

=== Series II ===
Pos	Team	Pld	W	D	L	GF	GA	GD	Pts	Promotion or relegation
1	Progresul Oradea (C, P)	26	18	4	4	54	16	+38	40	Promotion to Divizia A
2	Metalul Câmpia Turzii	26	14	5	7	44	22	+22	33	
3	Metalul Reșița	26	12	7	7	38	27	+11	31	
4	Flacăra Mediaș	26	13	5	8	37	28	+9	31	
5	Locomotiva Arad	26	11	6	9	35	28	+7	28	
6	Metalul Hunedoara	26	8	9	9	38	31	+7	25	
7	Locomotiva Cluj	26	11	3	12	45	38	+7	25	
8	Progresul Satu Mare	26	7	11	8	32	48	−16	25	
9	Minerul Lupeni	26	8	8	10	33	36	−3	24	
10	Flamura Roșie Cluj (R)	26	8	7	11	31	36	−5	23	Relegation to Divizia C
11	Metalul Baia Mare (R)	26	6	9	11	21	37	−16	21	Relegation to Divizia C
12	Metalul Oradea (R)	26	6	8	12	35	47	−12	20	Relegation to Divizia C
13	Metalul 108 Cugir (R)	26	7	5	14	31	55	−24	19	Relegation to Divizia C
14	Metalul Arad (R)	26	6	7	13	21	46	−25	19	Relegation to Divizia C

Source: romaniansoccer.ro
Rules for classification: 1) Points 2) Head-to-head points; 3) Head-to-head goal difference; 4) Head-to-head goals scored; 5) Head-to-head away goals scored; 6) Goal difference; 7) Goals scored.
(C) Champions; (P) Promoted; (R) Relegated

=== Series III ===
Pos	Team	Pld	W	D	L	GF	GA	GD	Pts	Promotion or relegation
1	Dinamo Bacău (C, P)	24	16	4	4	55	23	+32	36	Promotion to Divizia A
2	Flacăra Câmpina	24	15	3	6	44	27	+17	33	
3	Flacăra 1 Mai Ploiești	24	11	3	10	52	43	+9	25	
4	Progresul Focșani	24	10	5	9	26	28	−2	25	
5	Flamura Roșie Burdujeni	24	8	8	8	36	36	0	24	
6	Știința Iași	24	10	4	10	31	32	−1	24	
7	Flamura Roșie Bacău	24	8	7	9	40	37	+3	23	
8	Dinamo Bârlad	24	9	5	10	31	36	−5	23	
9	Locomotiva Iași	24	9	5	10	22	26	−4	23	
10	Flamura Roșie Buhuși (R)	24	10	2	12	35	44	−9	22	Relegation to Divizia C
11	Avântul Fălticeni (R)	24	8	6	10	21	30	−9	22	Relegation to Divizia C
12	Dinamo Galați (R)	24	8	1	15	30	40	−10	17	Relegation to Divizia C
13	Locomotiva Galați (R)	24	6	3	15	18	39	−21	15	Relegation to Divizia C

Source: romaniansoccer.ro
Rules for classification: 1) Points 2) Head-to-head points; 3) Head-to-head goal difference; 4) Head-to-head goals scored; 5) Head-to-head away goals scored; 6) Goal difference; 7) Goals scored.
(C) Champions; (P) Promoted; (R) Relegated

== See also ==
- 1955 Divizia A
- 1955 Regional Championship
- 1955 Cupa României
