= Stadionul Dacia (Orăștie) =

Multi-use stadium in Romania

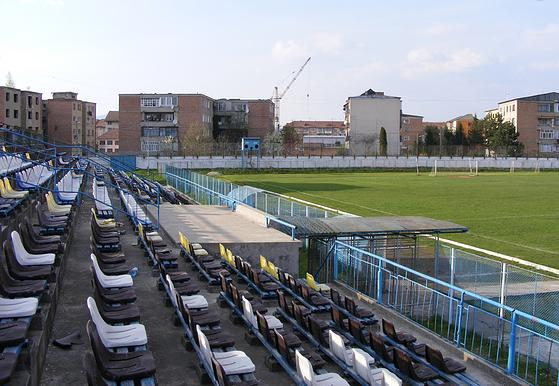
- Interactive map of Stadionul Dacia
- Location: Orăștie, Romania
- Coordinates: 45.8410°N 23.1910°E
- Owner: Municipality of Orăştie
- Operator: CSM Dacia Orăștie
- Capacity: 978
- Surface: Grass

Construction
- Opened: 1954
- Renovated: 2021

Tenants
- Dacia Orăştie (1954–present); Deva (2021–2022)

Dacia Stadium is a multi-use stadium in Orăștie, Hunedoara County. It is currently the home ground of Dacia Orăştie. It can currently holds 978 seats.
