= 1991–92 Divizia B =

Divizia B
- Season: 1991–92
- Promoted: Progresul București; CSM Reșița; Universitatea Cluj
- Relegated: Petrolul Ianca; Aris Arad; Chimica Târnăveni; Olimpia Râmnicu Sărat; Gaz Metan Mediaș; Electromureș Târgu Mureș; CS Târgoviște; UM Timișoara; Minerul Cavnic; FEPA 74 Bârlad; Șoimii IPA Sibiu; Aripile Bacău; Caracal; Metalurgistul Slatina; Relonul Savinești; Sportul 30 Decembrie; Astra Arad; Borzești

The 1991–92 Divizia B was the 52nd season of the second tier of the Romanian football league system.

The format has been maintained to three series, each of them having 18 teams. At the end of the season, the winners of the series promoted to Divizia A and the last six places from each series relegated to Divizia C. The number of the relegated teams was increased due to reducing the number of the teams in the league from 54 to 36, starting with the next season.

== Team changes ==
=== To Divizia B ===
Promoted from Divizia C

- Relonul Săvinești
- FEPA 74 Bârlad
- Petrolul Ianca
- Portul Constanța
- Metalul București
- Metrom Brașov
- Olt Scornicești
- Jiul IELIF Craiova
- Electromureș Târgu Mureș
- Minerul Cavnic
- CFR Cluj
- UM Timișoara

Relegated from Divizia A

- Jiul Petroșani
- Bihor Oradea
- Universitatea Cluj

=== From Divizia B ===
Relegated to Divizia C

- Siretul Pașcani
- Mecanică Fină București
- Vulturii Lugoj
- Prahova Ploiești
- Pandurii Târgu Jiu
- CIL Sighetu Marmației
- Poiana Câmpina
- Minerul Motru
- Aurul Brad
- Fortus Iași
- Montana Sinaia
- Progresul Timișoara

Promoted to Divizia A

- Oțelul Galați
- Electroputere Craiova
- ASA Electromureș Târgu Mureș

=== Renamed teams ===
Metalul București was renamed as Faur București.

Strungul Arad was renamed as Aris Arad.

Vagonul Arad was renamed as Astra Arad.

== Teams ==
Location of 1991–92 Divizia B clubs

== League tables ==
=== Serie I ===
Pos	Team	Pld	W	D	L	GF	GA	GD	Pts	Promotion or relegation
1	Progresul București (C, P)	34	20	7	7	64	31	+33	47	Promotion to Divizia A
2	Gloria CFR Galați	34	19	8	7	64	34	+30	46	
3	Autobuzul București	34	20	4	10	51	34	+17	44	
4	Faur București	34	17	7	10	68	41	+27	41	
5	Callatis Mangalia	34	15	9	10	46	30	+16	39	
6	Olt 90 Scornicești	34	17	4	13	57	43	+14	38	
7	Steaua Mizil	34	16	4	14	53	37	+16	36	
8	Flacăra Moreni	34	14	8	12	48	41	+7	36	
9	Unirea Slobozia	34	15	6	13	54	50	+4	36	
10	Gloria Buzău	34	12	11	11	54	38	+16	35	
11	Portul Constanța	34	14	7	13	54	43	+11	35	
12	Unirea Focșani	34	13	8	13	50	38	+12	34	
13	Petrolul Ianca (R)	34	13	5	16	52	47	+5	31	Relegation to Divizia C
14	Olimpia Râmnicu Sărat (R)	34	11	7	16	32	48	−16	29	Relegation to Divizia C
15	CS Târgoviște (R)	34	12	4	18	43	52	−9	28	Relegation to Divizia C
16	FEPA 74 Bârlad (R)	34	11	4	19	30	57	−27	26	Relegation to Divizia C
17	Caracal (R)	34	6	6	22	40	97	−57	18	Relegation to Divizia C
18	Sportul 30 Decembrie (R)	34	5	3	26	23	122	−99	13	Relegation to Divizia C

Source: romaniansoccer.ro (in Romanian)
Rules for classification: 1) Points; 2) Head-to-head points; 3) Head-to-head goal difference; 4) Head-to-head goals scored; 5) Head-to-head away goals scored; 6) Goal difference; 7) Goals scored.
(C) Champions; (P) Promoted; (R) Relegated

=== Serie II ===
Pos	Team	Pld	W	D	L	GF	GA	GD	Pts	Promotion or relegation
1	CSM Reșița (C, P)	34	20	4	10	54	29	+25	44	Promotion to Divizia A
2	UTA Arad (Note: UTA Arad were deducted 8 points for match-fixing.)	34	20	7	7	64	30	+34	39	
3	Jiul Petroșani	34	16	4	14	66	42	+24	36	
4	CFR Timișoara	34	16	4	14	44	51	−7	36	
5	Bihor Oradea (Note: Bihor Oradea was deducted 1 point.)	34	15	6	13	66	39	+27	35	
6	Chimia Râmnicu Vâlcea	34	14	7	13	44	38	+6	35	
7	Unirea Alba Iulia (Note: Unirea Alba Iulia were deducted 8 points for match-fixing.)	34	20	2	12	59	33	+26	34	
8	Gloria Reșița	34	14	6	14	50	46	+4	34	
9	Metalul Bocșa	34	15	4	15	50	51	−1	34	
10	Jiul IELIF Craiova	34	13	8	13	42	43	−1	34	
11	Metalurgistul Cugir	34	16	2	16	39	52	−13	34	
12	Drobeta-Turnu Severin	34	13	7	14	47	49	−2	33	
13	Aris Arad (R)	34	14	5	15	49	60	−11	33	Relegation to Divizia C
14	Gaz Metan Mediaș (R)	34	12	8	14	48	59	−11	32	Relegation to Divizia C
15	UM Timișoara (R)	34	9	6	19	37	75	−38	24	Relegation to Divizia C
16	Șoimii IPA Sibiu (Note: Șoimii IPA Sibiu were deducted 8 points for match-fixing.) (R)	34	12	7	15	51	51	0	23	Relegation to Divizia C
17	Metalurgistul Slatina (Note: Metalurgistul Slatina were deducted 8 points for match-fixing.) (R)	34	10	9	15	46	54	−8	21	Relegation to Divizia C
18	Astra Arad (R)	34	5	4	25	33	99	−66	14	Relegation to Divizia C

Source: romaniansoccer.ro (in Romanian)
Rules for classification: 1) Points; 2) Head-to-head points; 3) Head-to-head goal difference; 4) Head-to-head goals scored; 5) Head-to-head away goals scored; 6) Goal difference; 7) Goals scored.
(C) Champions; (P) Promoted; (R) Relegated

=== Serie III ===
Pos	Team	Pld	W	D	L	GF	GA	GD	Pts	Promotion or relegation
1	Universitatea Cluj (Note: Universitatea Cluj were deducted 2 points.) (C, P)	34	26	7	1	82	10	+72	57	Promotion to Divizia A
2	Maramureș Baia Mare	34	22	6	6	75	26	+49	50	
3	Ceahlăul Piatra Neamț	34	21	5	8	70	34	+36	47	
4	Metrom Brașov	34	16	5	13	57	38	+19	37	
5	Tractorul Brașov	34	16	5	13	58	47	+11	37	
6	CSM Suceava	34	15	7	12	44	45	−1	37	
7	CFR Cluj	34	15	5	14	65	52	+13	35	
8	Politehnica Iași	34	13	9	12	41	35	+6	35	
9	Olimpia Satu Mare	34	15	5	14	49	46	+3	35	
10	ICIM Brașov	34	14	7	13	43	53	−10	35	
11	Foresta Fălticeni	34	14	6	14	45	42	+3	34	
12	Armătura Zalău	34	12	9	13	54	53	+1	33	
13	Chimica Târnăveni (R)	34	11	8	15	42	51	−9	30	Relegation to Divizia C
14	Electromureș Târgu Mureș (R)	34	10	6	18	38	54	−16	26	Relegation to Divizia C
15	Minerul Cavnic (R)	34	10	6	18	36	64	−28	26	Relegation to Divizia C
16	Aripile Bacău (R)	34	9	4	21	48	82	−34	22	Relegation to Divizia C
17	Relonul Savinești (R)	34	8	4	22	33	79	−46	20	Relegation to Divizia C
18	Borzești (R)	34	2	10	22	17	86	−69	14	Relegation to Divizia C

Source: romaniansoccer.ro (in Romanian)
Rules for classification: 1) Points; 2) Head-to-head points; 3) Head-to-head goal difference; 4) Head-to-head goals scored; 5) Head-to-head away goals scored; 6) Goal difference; 7) Goals scored.
(C) Champions; (P) Promoted; (R) Relegated

== Top scorers ==
13 goals

- (Romania) Costel Orac (Unirea Focșani)

11 goals

- (Romania) Adrian Oprea (Gloria CFR Galați)

6 goals

- (Romania) Gigi Ion (Universitatea Cluj)

4 goals

- (Romania) Valentin Ștefan (Gloria CFR Galați)

== See also ==
- 1991–92 Divizia A
