= 1956 Cupa României final =

- Event: 1956 Cupa României
| Progresul Oradea | Energia Câmpia Turzii |
| 2 | 0 |
- Date: 9 December 1956
- Venue: Republicii, Bucharest
- Referee: Dumitru Schulder (Bucharest)
- Attendance: 30,000

The 1956 Cupa României final was the 19th final of Romania's most prestigious football cup competition. It was disputed between Energia Câmpia Turzii and Progresul Oradea, and was won by Progresul Oradea after a game with 2 goals. It was the first cup for Progresul Oradea.

Energia Câmpia Turzii was the fifth club representing Divizia B which reached the Romanian Cup final.

== Match details ==
9 December 1956
13:30 EET

| Progresul Oradea | 2–0 | Energia Câmpia Turzii |
|---|---|---|
| Köszegi 53'; Vlad 68' | Report |

Republicii, Bucharest
Attendance: 30,000
Referee: Dumitru Schulder (Bucharest)

| GK | 1 | (Romania) Adalbert Gebner |
| DF | 2 | (Romania) Gheorghe Kromely |
| DF | 3 | (Romania) Andor Tyirják |
| DF | 4 | (Romania) Gheorghe Barcu |
| MF | 5 | (Romania) Iosif Bartha |
| MF | 6 | (Romania) Ştefan Cuc |
| FW | 7 | (Romania) Ludovic Tóth |
| FW | 8 | (Romania) Ladislau Köszegi |
| FW | 9 | (Romania) Alexandru Karikas |
| FW | 10 | (Romania) Ladislau Vlad |
| FW | 11 | (Romania) Iosif Meszaros |
Manager:
(Romania) Camil Schertz

| GK | 1 | (Romania) Petre Carapeţ |
| DF | 2 | (Romania) Niculescu |
| DF | 3 | (Romania) Alexandru Mari |
| DF | 4 | (Romania) Ion Mureşan I |
| MF | 5 | (Romania) Tiberiu Ban |
| MF | 6 | (Romania) Iosif Ruzici |
| FW | 7 | (Romania) Moldovan |
| FW | 8 | (Romania) Teodor Copil II |
| FW | 9 | (Romania) Ioan Szigeti |
| FW | 10 | (Romania) Nicolae Safar |
| FW | 11 | (Romania) Anghel Burian |
Manager:
(Romania) Géza Tóth

== See also ==
- List of Cupa României finals
