= Romulus Gabor =

Romanian footballer

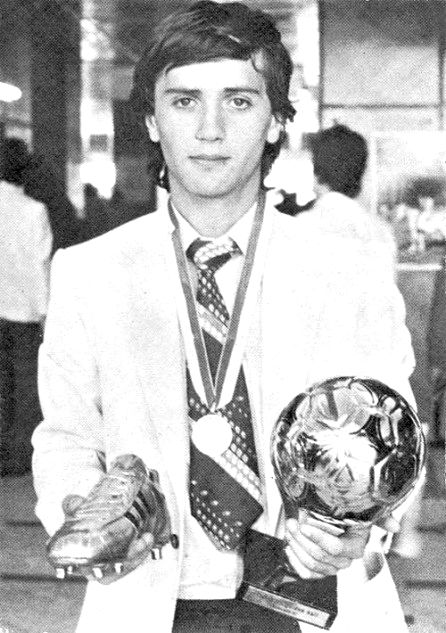
- Gabor in 1981

Personal information
- Date of birth: 14 October 1961 (age 65)
- Place of birth: Pui, Hunedoara County, Romania
- Height: 1.76 m (5 ft 9 in)
- Positions: Winger; forward

Youth career
- 1976: Jiul Petroșani
- 1976–1978: Corvinul Hunedoara

Senior career*
Years	Team	Apps	(Gls)
1978–1991	Corvinul Hunedoara	305	(68)
1991–1992	Diósgyőr	13	(1)
1992–1993	Corvinul Hunedoara		
1993–1994	Universitatea Cluj	10	(1)
1994	Unirea Alba Iulia	24	(4)
1994–1996	Corvinul Hunedoara	45	(15)
1996–1997	Inter Sibiu	14	(5)
1997	Viitorul Oradea		
Total		411	(94)

International career
1981	Romania U20	6	(2)
1981–1986	Romania	35	(2)

Managerial career
- 2004–2005: Corvinul Hunedoara
- 2007–2008: CFR Cluj (assistant)
- 2011–2012: Mureșul Deva
- 2014–2015: FC Hunedoara
- 2017–2019: Cetate Deva (technical director)
- 2019: Cetate Deva
Medal record
Representing Romania
FIFA World Youth Championship
Bronze medal – third place	FIFA U-20 World Cup	1981
- * Club domestic league appearances and goals

Romulus Gabor (born 14 October 1961) is a Romanian former professional footballer who played as a winger and as a forward.

== Club career ==
Gabor was born on 14 October 1961 in Pui, Hunedoara County, Romania. He began playing football at age 13 at Jiul Petroșani, where he stayed for a short while before moving to Corvinul Hunedoara. On 28 October 1978 he made his Divizia A debut under coach Ilie Savu in Corvinul's 2–0 loss to Argeș Pitești. At the end of his first season, they were relegated to Divizia B, but Gabor stayed with Corvinul, being used more often after coach Mircea Lucescu came to the club, earning promotion back to the first division after one year. He helped The Ravens finish third in the 1981–82 Divizia A season. For the way he played in 1981, Gabor was placed fifth in the ranking for the Romanian Footballer of the Year award. He also appeared in all four games in the 1982–83 UEFA Cup campaign, scoring once as they got past Grazer AK in the first round, being eliminated in the following one by FK Sarajevo.

After 13 seasons spent with Corvinul, he was transferred to Hungarian club, Diósgyőr where he was teammates with compatriot and former Corvinul colleague, Ioan Petcu. He made his Nemzeti Bajnokság I debut on 15 September 1991 under coach Ladislau Vlad in a 2–1 home loss to Vasas. Gabor scored his first and only goal for them on 26 October when he closed the score in a 2–1 victory over Győr. He totalled 13 matches with one goal scored in the Hungarian league, his last appearance taking place on 20 June 1992 in a 2–0 home loss to Ferencváros.

Afterwards he returned to play for Corvinul in Divizia B. Subsequently, he went for half a season to play for Universitatea Cluj where he made his last Divizia A appearance on 10 November 1993 in a 3–2 win against Gloria Bistrița. In the following years he played for Unirea Alba Iulia, Corvinul and Inter Sibiu in Divizia B, ending his career in 1997 at Divizia C club, Viitorul Oradea. Gabor has a total of 304 Divizia A appearances with 64 goals scored.

== International career ==
Gabor was selected by coach Constantin Cernăianu to be part of Romania's under-20 squad for the 1981 World Youth Championship held in Australia. He appeared in six games in which he scored four goals, helping the team finish the tournament in third position, winning the bronze medal. He also won the Golden Ball award for the best player of the tournament and the Bronze shoe for the third top-scorer of the competition.

Gabor played 35 games and scored two goals for Romania, all under the guidance of coach Mircea Lucescu, being nicknamed "Lucescu's child", making his debut on 11 November 1981 in a 0–0 draw against Switzerland in the 1982 World Cup qualifiers. He played six games in the successful Euro 1984 qualifiers. Afterwards he was used by Lucescu in two games in the final tournament, as Romania did not get past the group stage. In the first one which was a 1–1 draw against Spain he played as a starter until the 76th minute when he was replaced by Gheorghe Hagi and in the second he came as a substitute and replaced Mircea Irimescu in the 59th minute of the 1–0 loss to Portugal. He scored his first goal for the national team from a free kick in a 1–1 friendly draw against Turkey. Afterwards, Gabor played two games in the 1986 World Cup qualifiers and scored his second goal in a 1–0 friendly win over Egypt. He made his last appearance for The Tricolours on 23 April 1986 in a 2–1 friendly victory against the Soviet Union.

For representing his country at Euro 1984, Gabor was decorated by President of Romania Traian Băsescu on 25 March 2008 with the Ordinul "Meritul Sportiv" – (The Medal "The Sportive Merit") class III.

=== International goals ===
Scores and results list Romania's goal tally first, score column indicates score after each Gabor goal.

List of international goals scored by Romulus Gabor
#	Date	Venue	Cap	Opponent	Score	Result	Competition
1	29 January 1983	Ali Sami Yen Stadium, Istanbul, Turkey	12	Turkey	1–0	1–1	Friendly
2	2 March 1986	Al-Iskandarīyah Stadium, Alexandria, Egypt	33	Egypt	1–0	1–0	Friendly

== Managerial career ==
After he ended his career, Gabor worked as a coach for clubs such as Corvinul Hunedoara and Mureșul Deva. In the 2007–08 season he was the assistant of Ioan Andone at CFR Cluj as the club won The Double. His last coaching spell took place in 2019 at Cetate Deva.

== Honours ==
Corvinul Hunedoara

- Divizia B: 1979–80

Individual

- FIFA U-20 World Cup Golden Ball: 1981
- Romanian Footballer of the Year (fifth place): 1981
