= Alexandru Dan =

Romanian footballer

Personal information
- Full name: Alexandru Angelo Dan
- Date of birth: 30 January 1994 (age 32)
- Place of birth: Deva, Romania
- Height: 1.76 m (5 ft 9 1/2 in)
- Position: Midfielder

Youth career
- –2009: Mureșul Deva

Senior career*
Years	Team	Apps	(Gls)
2009–2012	Mureșul Deva	35+	(1)
2012–2013	Târgu Mureș	5	(0)
2013–2014	Pandurii Târgu Jiu	3	(0)
2013–2014	→ ASA Târgu Mureș (loan)	24	(1)
2014–2015	Rapid București	10	(0)
2015–2017	Pandurii Târgu Jiu	1	(0)
2016	→ Universitatea Cluj (loan)	5	(1)
2016	→ Metalul Reșița (loan)	2	(0)
2017	Metalul Reșița	3	(0)
2017	Cetate Deva	1	(0)
2018	Lugoj		
2018–2020	Hunedoara		

International career^{‡}
2010	Romania U-17	1	(0)
2012	Romania U-19	4	(0)
2013–2016	Romania U-21	6	(0)
- * Club domestic league appearances and goals as of 11 September 2020 ‡ National team caps and goals as of 13 October 2014

Alexandru Angelo Dan (born 30 January 1994) is a Romanian footballer who plays as a midfielder. He previously played for Mureșul Deva, Târgu Mureș, Pandurii Târgu Jiu, Rapid București, Universitatea Cluj, Metalul Reșița and Cetate Deva.
