= Rareș =

Rareș is a Romanian masculine given name.

- Peter IV Rareș, prince of Moldavia
- Ilie II Rareș, prince of Moldavia
- Rareș Chintoan, Romanian wrestler
- Rareș Cuzdriorean, Romanian tennis player
- Rareș Dumitrescu, Romanian fencer
- Rareș Enceanu Romanian footballer
- Rareș Mandache Romanian basketball player
- Rareș Șerban, commonly known as Chris Șerban, Canadian soccer player
- Rareș Soporan, Romanian footballer
- Rareș Vârtic, Romanian footballer

== See also ==
- Petru Rareș, Bistrița-Năsăud, a commune in Bistrița-Năsăud County, Romania
- Rareș, a village in Mărtiniș Commune, Harghita County, Romania
