= Valentin Cosmin Lipitor =

Romanian footballer

Valentin Lipitor
Personal information
- Full name: Valentin Cosmin Lipitor
- Date of birth: 24 February 1982 (age 44)
- Place of birth: Deva, Romania
- Height: 1.88 m (6 ft 2 in)
- Position: Goalkeeper

Senior career*
Years	Team	Apps	(Gls)
1990–1998	Cetate Deva	?	(?)
1998–2003	Dinamo București	0	(0)
2003–2004	Corvinul Hunedoara	12	(?)
2004–2007	Ghazl El-Mehalla	19	(0)
2007–2010	Bihor Oradea	87	(0)
2010–2011	Ceahlăul Piatra Neamţ	5	(0)
2011–2012	Mureşul Deva	14	(0)
Total		30+	(0)
- * Club domestic league appearances and goals as of 20 September 2017

Valentin Cosmin Lipitor (born 24 February 1982) is a Romanian former footballer who played as goalkeeper. In Liga I he played for Ceahlăul Piatra Neamţ.
