= Ioan Petcu =

Romanian footballer and manager

Personal information
- Date of birth: 1 May 1959 (age 67)
- Place of birth: Hunedoara, Romania
- Position: Midfielder

Team information
- Current team: Corvinul Hunedoara (head of youth development)

Youth career
- 1973–1976: Corvinul Hunedoara

Senior career*
Years	Team	Apps	(Gls)
1976–1990	Corvinul Hunedoara	385	(146)
1990–1991	APEP Pelendriou		
1991–1992	Diósgyőr Miskolc	28	(5)
1992–1994	Corvinul Hunedoara		
Total		413	(151)

International career
1982–1986	Romania	2	(0)

Managerial career
- 1995: Corvinul Hunedoara
- 1999–2000: Cetate Deva
- Aurul Certej
- 2004: Aurul Brad
- 2004–2005: Unirea Sânnicolau Mare
- 2005–2006: Corvinul 2005 Hunedoara
- 2006–2008: Unirea Sânnicolau Mare
- 2008: FC Hunedoara
- 2009: Bihor Oradea
- 2010–2011: FC Hunedoara
- 2012: Mureșul Deva (assistant)
- 2018–2019: Cetate Deva
- 2021–2023: Aurul Brad
- 2023–: Corvinul Hunedoara (head of youth development)
- * Club domestic league appearances and goals

Ioan Petcu (born 1 May 1959) is a Romanian professional football manager and former player who played as a midfielder, currently head of youth development at Liga I club Corvinul Hunedoara.

== Club career ==
Petcu was born on 1 May 1959 in Hunedoara, Romania. When he was aged 14, his football talent was noticed by coach Dumitru Pătrașcu who brought him to Corvinul Hunedoara. On 2 April 1977, he made his Divizia A debut, playing in Corvinul's 2–1 home win against Steaua București. In 1979 the team was relegated but Petcu stayed with the club, helping it get promoted back to the first league after one season under the guidance of coach Mircea Lucescu. Afterwards he helped Corvinul finish third in the 1981–82 Divizia A season. Then he appeared in four games in the 1982–83 UEFA Cup as they got past Grazer AK in the first round, being eliminated in the following one by FK Sarajevo, Petcu scoring a goal against the latter with a lob after an assist from Florea Dumitrache. In the 1985–86 season as coach Ion Ionescu promoted an offensive style of play, Petcu managed to score a personal record of 20 goals. On 5 June 1990, he made his last Divizia A appearance in a 2–0 home victory against Universitatea Craiova, totaling 363 matches with 135 goals in the competition, all of them for Corvinul.

In 1990 he went to play in the Cypriot Second Division for APEP Pelendriou. After one year, he was transferred to Hungarian club, Diósgyőr where he was teammates with compatriot and former Corvinul colleague, Romulus Gabor. He made his Nemzeti Bajnokság I debut on 25 August 1991 under coach Ladislau Vlad in a 2–0 home loss to Siófok. Petcu scored his first goal for them on 20 September when he opened the score in a 2–1 away loss to BVSC. On 3 May 1992 he netted a double in a 2–0 win over Videoton. He gained a total of 28 matches and five goals in the Hungarian league, with his last appearance taking place on 20 June 1992 in a 2–0 home loss to Ferencváros.

In 1992, Petcu made a comeback to Corvinul in Divizia B where he ended his career two years later.

== International career ==
Petcu played two games for Romania, making his debut on 1 May 1982 when coach Mircea Lucescu sent him at half-time to replace Aurel Țicleanu in a 3–1 victory against Cyprus in the Euro 1984 qualifiers. His following game was a friendly which took place on 2 March 1986 and ended with a 1–0 win over Egypt.

== Managerial career ==
After he ended his playing career, Petcu started to work as a manager in 1995, coaching various teams in the Romanian lower leagues such as Corvinul Hunedoara, Unirea Sânnicolau Mare, Bihor Oradea, FC Hunedoara, Mureșul Deva and Cetate Deva. He managed to gain promotion to Liga II with Unirea Sânnicolau Mare in the 2007–08 season. After 2012 he was the vice-president of FC Hunedoara. His last coaching spell took place between 2021 and 2023 at Aurul Brad in Liga III.

== Career statistics ==
=== International ===
Appearances and goals by national team and year
National team	Year	Apps	Goals
Romania
Romania	1982	1	0
Romania	1986	1	0
Total		2	0

== Honours ==
=== Player ===
Corvinul Hunedoara

- Divizia B: 1979–80

=== Coach ===
Cetate Deva

- Divizia C: 1999–00

Unirea Sânnicolau Mare

- Liga III: 2007–08
