= Constantin Bumbac =

Romanian football centre back

Personal information
- Date of birth: 29 April 1984 (age 42)
- Place of birth: Suceava, Romania
- Height: 1.91 m (6 ft 3 in)
- Position: Centre back

Senior career*
Years	Team	Apps	(Gls)
2000–2001	Foresta Fălticeni	0	(0)
2001–2003	Jiul Petroșani	1	(0)
2003–2004	Minerul Aninoasa		
2004–2005	Cetate Deva	24	(0)
2005	Corvinul Hunedoara	9	(0)
2005–2007	CFR Timișoara	40	(0)
2007–2009	UTA Arad	6	(0)
2009–2010	Unirea Alba Iulia	5	(0)
2010–2011	Mioveni	2	(0)
2011–2012	Unirea Alba Iulia	19	(2)
2013–2014	Farul Constanța	28	(0)
2014–2016	Dunărea Călărași	18	(0)
2016–2017	Farul Constanța	4	(0)
2017	Agricola Borcea	11	(4)
2018	Axiopolis Cernavodă	10	(4)
2018–2019	Medgidia		
2019–2020	Viitorul Verești		
2020–2022	Gloria Albești	20	(1)
2022–2023	Axiopolis Cernavodă		
Total		197	(11)

Managerial career
- 2022–2023: Axiopolis Cernavodă (assistant)
- * Club domestic league appearances and goals as of 15:14, 11 January 2024 (UTC)

Constantin Bumbac (born 29 April 1984) is a Romanian former footballer who played as a centre back for teams such as Cetate Deva, CFR Timișoara, Farul Constanța or Dunărea Călărași, among others.
