= Ioan Bogdan =

Ioan Bogdan may refer to:

- Ioan Bogdan (historian) (1864–1919), Romanian historian and philologist
- Ioan Bogdan (footballer) (born 1956), Romanian footballer

== See also ==
- Ion Bogdan (1915–1992), Romanian footballer and manager
- Ioan
- Bogdan
