= Gheorghe Barcu =

Romanian footballer

Personal information
- Date of birth: 1934 (age 91–92)
- Place of birth: Brașov, Romania
- Position: Defender

Senior career*
Years	Team	Apps	(Gls)
1954–1956	Progresul Oradea	37	(0)
1956–1958	Dinamo Obor București		
1958–1961	Știința Timișoara	2	(0)
1961–1963	Mureșul Târgu Mureș		
Total		39	(0)
- * Club domestic league appearances and goals

Gheorghe Barcu (born 1934) is a Romanian former professional footballer who played as a defender. Barcu played in the Divizia A for Progresul Oradea, Dinamo Obor București and Știința Timișoara. In 1956, with Barcu on the pitch, Progresul Oradea won the Cupa României, after a 2–0 win against Energia Câmpia Turzii.

== Honours ==
Progresul Oradea

- Divizia B: 1955
- Cupa României: 1956

Știința Timișoara

- Divizia B: 1959–60
