= Adrian Borza =

Romanian footballer

Personal information
- Full name: Adrian Dumitru Borza
- Date of birth: 18 February 1985 (age 41)
- Place of birth: Cluj-Napoca, Romania
- Height: 1.80 m (5 ft 11 in)
- Positions: Winger; attacking midfielder

Youth career
- 1995–2004: Universitatea Cluj

Senior career*
Years	Team	Apps	(Gls)
2004–2006	Universitatea Cluj	9	(1)
2006	Gloria Bistriţa	6	(0)
2006–2010	Universitatea Cluj	33	(4)
2007	→ Mureşul Deva (loan)	15	(2)
2008	→ IS Câmpia Turzii (loan)	14	(1)
2010	Arieşul Turda	5	(0)
2010–2011	Mureşul Deva	10	(7)
2011–2012	Petrolul Ploieşti	14	(1)
2013–2014	Universitatea Cluj	37	(6)
2015–2017	Târgu Mureș	9	(0)
- * Club domestic league appearances and goals as of 13 January 2017

Adrian Dumitru Borza (born 18 February 1985) is a Romanian footballer. He played for Gloria Bistriţa in the 2005–06 Divizia A season.
