= Alexandru Mari =

Romanian footballer

Personal information
- Date of birth: 8 November 1919
- Place of birth: Arad, Romania
- Date of death: 9 September 1997 (aged 77)
- Position: Midfielder

Youth career
- 1932–1935: AMEF Arad
- 1935–1937: Sparta Arad

Senior career*
Years	Team	Apps	(Gls)
1938–1940	Industria Sârmei Câmpia Turzii		
1941–1944	FC Craiova (Note: The Divizia A 1940–41 was the last season before World War II and the Divizia A 1946–47 was the first one after, so the appearances and goals scored during this period for FC Craiova are not official.)	12	(0)
1946–1949	CFR București	60	(2)
1950–1958	Industria Sârmei Câmpia Turzii (Note: The statistics for the 1950, 1951, 1953, 1955, 1956 and 1957–58 Divizia B seasons are unavailable.)	48	(3)
Total		120	(5)

International career
1943–1947	Romania	4	(0)
- * Club domestic league appearances and goals

Alexandru Mari (8 November 1919 – 9 September 1997) was a Romanian football midfielder.

== International career ==
Alexandru Mari played four games at international level for Romania, making his debut in a friendly which ended 2–2 against Slovakia. He also played two games at the 1947 Balkan Cup in a 4–0 away victory against Albania and a 3–1 home loss against Yugoslavia. Alexandru Mari's last game for the national team was a friendly which ended with a 6–2 loss against Czechoslovakia.

== Honours ==
Industria Sârmei Câmpia Turzii

- Divizia B: 1951
- Cupa României runner-up: 1956
