= CSM Deva =

Romanian football club

- Full name: Club Sportiv; Municipal Deva
- Nicknames: Devenii (The People of Deva); Cetățenii (The Citizens)
- Short name: CSM Deva
- Founded: 1921; 105 years ago as Mureșul Deva; 1994; 32 years ago as Vega Deva; 2003; 23 years ago as CS Deva; 2006; 20 years ago as Mureșul Deva; 2013; 13 years ago as Cetate Deva
- Ground: Cetate
- Capacity: 4,000
- Owner: Deva Municipality
- Chairman: Ioan Ardelean
- Manager: Ciprian Luca
- League: Liga III
- 2025–26: Liga IV Hunedoara, 1st (promoted via play-offs)
Home colours	Away colours

Club Sportiv Municipal Deva, commonly known as CSM Deva, is a Romanian professional football club based in Deva, Hunedoara County. The club was originally established in 1921 under the name of Mureșul Deva and since 1964 was a constant presence at the level of Liga III and Liga II under various names, such as: Minerul Deva, Explormin Deva, Explorări Deva, Vega Deva, Cetate Deva or CS Deva, but mainly under the name of Mureșul Deva.

Club's most fruitful periods were during the 1970s and 2000s when the club spent six, respectively five seasons in the second tier of the Romanian football league system. The best ranking of Cetate Deva was a 4th place at the end of the 1973–74 Divizia B season, period when the club was managed by Ladislau Vlad.

Over time the club suffered several re-foundations, from two mergers (with Vega Caransebeș in 1994 and with CS Certej in 2003) to two re-establishments (as CS Mureșul Deva in 2006 and as CNS Cetate Deva in 2013).

== History ==
=== First years (1921–1970) ===
CSM Deva was established in 1921, under the name of Mureșul Deva and played at county level until 1943, when appeared as a member of the Heroes Cup, this time under the name of Corvinul Deva.

After World War II, Corvinul Deva was an active part of the third tier and regional leagues, but without obtaining any notable results for the next 20 years. Devenii appeared in the re-organized Divizia C during the 1964–65 season, under the name of Minerul Deva (The Miner), financially supported by the mining industry from Hunedoara County. In that season, Minerul (coached by Mircea Zeană and Mircea Miron) was ranked 2nd, with the same number of points as the leader (CFR Arad) and the third place (Metalul Hunedoara), but missed a spot in the second tier in the favor of the club based in Arad.

After this result, Minerul was ranked 5th in 1966, then in the summer of the same year changed again its name, now back in Mureșul Deva, name under which the team based in Deva would obtain its most important results. Until the end of the 1960s, Mureșul remained a constant team at the level of the third league, with rankings between 5th and 10th (out of 14).

Starting with the 1970–71 season, Mureșul changed its objectives and from a middle-table team became a candidate for the promotion in the Divizia B. At that time, heads of the club, D. Cepănaru and I. Anescu decided to make all the needed efforts to promote the team in the second tier. In the first season Mureșul missed again the promotion spot, one point behind Independența Sibiu, then in 1972, three points split "the team below Deva Citadel" from the leader, Vagonul Arad. The most important movements were made by the administrative staff in the summer of 1972, when as a manager was hired Ladislau Vlad, a coach that already had succeed to promote with his hometown club, Crișul Oradea, in 1971, from Divizia B to Divizia A.

Vlad has built a redoubtable team at Deva, then at the end of the 1972–73 season, the dream of Mureșul, a promotion to Divizia B, was achieved, finishing first, 6 points ahead UM Timișoara. The squad was composed of the following players: V. Rusu – Ceaușu I, Ceaușu II, T. Pop, Puia, Stanciu, Nenu, Iancu, Macovei, Gherga, Tarcu, Precup, Macavei, Achim, Stark, Haidu, Uilecan, Mircea Marian, Mihai Marian, Moț, Naghi, Sereș, Stoian, Covaciu, P. Grigore, I. Ardelean and Ș. Dubinciuc. After promotion, the squad received reinforcements, among them Árpád Szűcs, former player of FC Bihor Oradea and one of the most important player of Deva in the autumn of 1973. At the end of the season, Mureșul was ranked 4th (best ranking in the history of the club), but Ladislau Vlad left the team and went back to FC Bihor Oradea, to promote the team once again in the top-flight.

In the summer of 1974, Nicolae Oaidă (former great player of Progresul București) was hired as the new manager and important players such as Șchiopu, Gruber, Selymessy, Szilaghi, Cojocaru, Oncu or Buciuman were transferred. During the winter of 1975, Vlad returned to Mureșul Deva, leaving FC Bihor on the first place in its series of Divizia B. In the following period, some players left Oradea and came to Deva strengthening the squad even more, Mureșul was ranked 7th out of 18.

At the end of the 1975–76 season Mureșul Deva saved from relegation in the last minute, then followed a 10th place (1976–77 season) and a 5th place (1977–78 season). The ups and downs of the last seasons have materialized in a relegation at the end of the 1978–79 season, only the goal difference making the split between Mureșul and last saved team, Înfrățirea Oradea.

Back in the third division, Mureșul Deva was renamed again as Minerul Deva, with the mining industry of Hunedoara County as the main sponsor and Ion Ștefănescu as the new president. In this refreshed formula, Deva was ranked 2nd (9 points behind CFR Timișoara) and missed once again the promotion. This result was not well received and in the summer of 1980, Minerul Deva absorbed the other Divizia C side, Explorări Deva and the team was renamed as Explormin Deva. All the financial forces of the town were reunited under the Explormin umbrella, in the attempt to get back in the second tier.

In the following years it seemed that Deva was pursued by misfortune, finishing no less than three times in a row on the second place (1981, 1982 and 1983), at one, five and two points behind Strungul Arad, Metalurgistul Cugir, respectively Minerul Lupeni. During the 1982–83 season, the club evolved under the name Explorări Deva.

=== The best period (1970–1990) ===
Name	Period
Mureșul Deva	1921–1943
Corvinul Deva	1943–1950
Minerul Deva	1950–1966
Mureșul Deva	1966–1979
Minerul Deva	1979–1980
Explormin Deva	1980–1982
Explorări Deva	1982–1983
Mureșul Deva	1983–1994
Vega Deva	1994–1999
Cetate Deva	1999–2001
Mureșul Deva	2001–2003
CS Deva	2003–2006
Mureșul Deva	2006–2012
CNS Cetate Deva	2013–2018
LPS Cetate Deva	2018–2020
CSM Deva	2020–present

In the summer of 1983, Explorări Deva was renamed again as Mureșul Deva and the luck came back on the side of the club from Hunedoara County, at the end of the 1983–84 edition the team winning its series and promoting in the second tier, to the detriment of the same rival in front of which it had promoted in 1973, UM Timișoara.

Mureșul remained in the second division until 1987, when it relegated again, after occupying the 16th place (out of 18). The relegation was followed by another 2nd place in the third tier (1988) then by another promotion in 1989, when Devenii dominated their series and promoted with an advanced of 10 points over the second place, Metalurgistul Cugir. This time the team based in Hunedoara County resist only one edition before relegating again in 1990. This relegation was the end of the most fruitful period in the history of the club from Deva.

During the 1970s and 1980s, Mureșul was also managed by Petre Dăscăliță, Adalbert Kassai, Traian Ivănescu, Constantin Ștefan, Dumitru Borcău, Teodor Pop, Gheorghe Țurlea or Carol Gal and were part of the squad, players such as: Balla, Naghi, Sava, Bucur, Fogoroși, Nicoară, Ștef, Vidican, Preda, Tirchineci, Mechimici, Dumitreasă, Olușuteanu, Vălășuteanu, Szabados, Mateescu, Văetuș, Varga or Rădos.

=== Deva can't find its rhythm (1990–2006) ===
After the 1990 relegation, Mureșul spent another two seasons in the third division, but finishing below expectations, on the 11th and 5th place, and due to the reorganization of the competitive system, in the summer of 1992, dictated by the Romanian Football Federation, the club relegated to the county championship.

In 1994, the newly promoted team, Vega Caransebeș, was merged with the local side, the new entity was named as Vega Deva and started to play in the Divizia C. Vega was ranked 5th and 10th before promoting to Divizia B at the end of the 1996–97, when it won its series with an advance of three points over the second place, FC Drobeta-Turnu Severin. The squad that managed to obtain this performance was chaired by Nicolae Stanca and managed by Ionel Stanca, having in its composition players such as: Rahoveanu, Fartușnic, Tănasă, Fl. Voinea, G. Ștefan, Em. Popa, Fl. Danciu, Luca, Személy, Fl. Berindei, P. Naniu, Grosu or Chiliman, among others.

Vega spent only two mediocre seasons in the second division, then relegated back to Divizia C at the end of the 1998–99 season. In the summer of 1999, Vega Deva was renamed for the first time as Cetate Deva and the refreshed organization of the club brought another promotion in the second tier, in 2000. After promotion, the club encountered financial problems and withdrew in the first part of the season, subsequently being excluded from the league.

In the summer of 2001, the club managed to enroll in the third tier under the old name of Mureșul Deva, then obtaining two middle-table rankings (8th and 5th).

In the summer of 2003, as a proof that Deva could not find its rhythm, Mureșul merged with the newly promoted club CS Certej, the new entity was named as CS Deva and continued the football tradition of Mureșul, but in the second tier, instead of third. Two seasons spent CS Deva in the Divizia B (10th and 12th place), before selling its place to Corvinul 2005 Hunedoara, in the summer of 2005. CS Deva continued for another season in the third tier, but was ranked only 12th (out of 14).

=== Mureșul is back (2006–2012) ===
Mureșul Deva logo (2006–2012)

In the summer of 2006, CS Deva was re-organized as CS Mureșul Deva, bringing back the old name of the club, the name under which the team obtained its greatest results. Agro Company (sausage manufacturing company) and the Municipality of Deva, owners of the club named former Divizia A player Gheorghe Barbu as the manager of "the white and reds". Mureșul promoted after only one season, this time from the second place, taking advantage of the Romanian football league system restructuring.

During the late 2000s and early 2010s, Mureșul Deva succeeded to become again a constant presence at the level of Liga II, for the first time since the 1970s and 1980s. Mureșul was ranked 7th (2007–08), 12th (2008–09) and 14th (2009–10), relegating in 2010, but then being spared from relegation due to the withdrawal of Liga I side Internațional Curtea de Argeș. In 2010, Agro Company, main sponsor of the team, entered in insolvency and the financial problems started at the club. After the weak results, Gheorghe Barbu was changed with Constantin Olariu, then Olariu with Romulus Gabor, but the results were still poor and Mureșul relegated at the end of 2011–12 season, after five consecutive seasons in the second league, subsequently being dissolved.

In this period, for Mureșul Deva played footballers such as: Rahoveanu, Lipitor – N. Oltean, Dosan, Vârtic, Ad. Bud, Lintaru, J. Vajda, Sătmar, Borza, Dârvaru, Bițiș, E. Vajda, Sântejudean, I. Moldovan, Cireș, Pisoiu, Păcurar, A. Coman, Bunea, Onicaș, I. Baciu, Személy, Al. Dan, Gârlă, Apetri or Gongolea, among many others.

=== New start with Cetate college (2013–2020) ===
Cetate Deva logo (2013–2016)

Cetate Deva logo (2016–2020)

In the summer of 2013, the club was re-founded under the name of Cetate Deva and was enrolled in the Liga IV, Hunedoara County, in order to continue the football tradition in Deva after the dissolution of the old entity, Mureșul Deva. It was affiliated with the local sporting highschool "Colegiul Național Sportiv Cetate" of Deva, thus the full name CNS Cetate Deva. In 2018, the educational institution was relegated from 'colegiu' to 'liceu' status, the new name being "Liceul cu Program Sportiv Cetate", therefore the football team followed suit and was officially known as LPS Cetate Deva, though it still kept the old initials on the logo.

In its first season after re-founding, Cetate reached the third place in the Liga IV and did not manage to promote to Liga III. Next season, the "citizens" won the championship and qualified for the Liga III promotion play-offs, where encountered Gilortul Târgu Cărbunești, champions of Liga IV – Gorj County. In the home match they beat Gilortul (8–2) and secured the promotion. Away Cetate won (1–3) and promoted in the Liga III.

Cetate Deva debuted in the 2015–16 Liga III season with a victory, 3–1 against CSO Filiași. All the season was a good one, the team based in Deva finishing on the 6th place.

In the summer of 2016, Cetate Deva started the training with a new coach, former Corvinul Hunedoara player, Ciprian Pepenar, with a squad composed mainly of Liga I and Liga II former players and with the objective of promoting to Liga II. After a disastrous start, Ciprian Pepenar was sacked and former Oțelul Galați player and coach, Viorel Tănase, was hired. Also in the last rounds of the first part Ousmane N'Doye signed a player/manager contract with the club and the team began to climb in the league table. After this edition in which the club ended on the 6th place, followed three poor seasons: 8th (2017–18), 13th (2018–19) and 12th (2019–20). At the end of the 2018–19 season the club relegated but was spared by the Romanian Football Federation, due to lack of teams.

=== Municipality era (2020-present) ===
Cementing a move that was in the works for a few months, on 18 August 2020 the Romanian Football Federation approved the cession from LPS Cetate Deva, who transferred its right to take part in football competitions (Liga III) to the club owned by the municipality of Deva, CSM Deva. Through this move, LPS Cetate was dissafiliated and CSM Deva was affiliated in its place, providing continuity to the Deva team.

CSM Deva won the Liga 4 Hunedoara winning ever single league match. They are set to face the winner of Liga 4 Arad in a promotion play off.

== Ground ==
CSM Deva plays its home matches on Cetate Stadium, located in Deva, Hunedoara County. The stadium was opened in the 1960s and has a capacity of 4,000 on seats (ranked 3rd in the county, after Jiul and Michael Klein Stadiums).

In 2024, a brand new blue running track was added around the pitch.

In 2025, new seats were added.

== Honours ==
- Liga III:
  - Winners (6): 1972–73, 1983–84, 1988–89, 1996–97, 1999–2000, 2022–23
  - Runners-up (10): 1964–65, 1970–71, 1971–72, 1979–80, 1980–81, 1981–82, 1982–83, 1987–88, 2006–07, 2021–22
- Liga IV – Hunedoara County
  - Winners (3): 1993–94, 2014–15, 2025–26

=== Other performances ===
- Appearances in Liga II: 20
- Best finish in Liga II: 4th place in the 1973–74 season.

== Club officials ==
=== Board of directors ===
Role	Name
Owner	(Romania) Deva Municipality
President	(Romania) Nelu Ardelean
Executive President	(Romania) Daniel Cherecheși
Sporting director	(Romania) Cristian Gîț
Youth Center Manager	(Romania) Marius Sîrbu

=== Current technical staff ===
Role	Name
Manager	(Romania) Ciprian Luca
Assistant manager	(Romania) Elek Szemely
Goalkeeping coach	(Romania) József Magyari
Masseur	(Romania) Ioan Răfăilă
Storeman	(Romania) Ioan Varga

== League history ==
Season	Tier	Division	Place	Notes	Cupa României
2026–27	3	Liga III	TBD		Regional final
2025–26	4	Liga IV (HD)	1st (C, P)	Promoted	County phase winners
2024–25	4	Liga IV (HD)	11th	7th in play-out	
2023–24	3	Liga III (Seria VII)	3rd	Withdrew	Play-off round
2022–23	3	Liga III (Seria VII)	1st (C)		
2021–22	3	Liga III (Seria VII)	2nd		
2020–21	3	Liga III (Seria VII)	5th		
2019–20	3	Liga III (Seria IV)	12th		
2018–19	3	Liga III (Seria IV)	13th		
2017–18	3	Liga III (Seria IV)	8th		
2016–17	3	Liga III (Seria IV)	6th		Round of 32
2015–16	3	Liga III (Seria IV)	6th		
2014–15	4	Liga IV (HD)	1st (C, P)	Promoted	

Season	Tier	Division	Place	Notes	Cupa României
2013–14	4	Liga IV (HD)	3rd		
2012–13	Not active				
2011–12	2	Liga II (Seria II)	15th (R)	Relegated	
2010–11	2	Liga II (Seria II)	13th		
2009–10	2	Liga II (Seria II)	14th		
2008–09	2	Liga II (Seria II)	12th		
2007–08	2	Liga II (Seria II)	7th		
2006–07	3	Liga III (Seria V)	2nd (P)	Promoted	
2005–06	3	Divizia C (Seria VII)	12th		
2004–05	2	Divizia B (Seria III)	12th (R)	Relegated	
2003–04	2	Divizia B (Seria III)	10th		
2002–03	3	Divizia C (Seria VI)	5th (P)	Promoted	
2001–02	3	Divizia C (Seria VI)	8th		
2000–01	2	Divizia B (Seria II)	17th (R)	Relegated	

== Notable former players ==
The footballers enlisted below have had international cap(s) for their respective countries at junior and/or senior level, more than 100 caps for LPS Cetate Deva or played in more than 15 matches for Cetate Deva at the level of Liga II (highest level achieved by the club).

- (Romania) Ioan Achim
- (Romania) Adrian Borza
- (Romania) Constantin Bumbac
- (Romania) Dumitru Cojocaru
- (Romania) Alexandru Dan
- (Romania) Leontin Doană
- (Romania) Adrian Dosan
- (Romania) Ștefan Dubinciuc
- (Romania) Mario Gruber
- (Romania) Raul Lintaru
- (Romania) Valentin Lipitor
- (Romania) Mircea Marian
- (Romania) Ion Mateescu
- (Senegal) Ousmane N'Doye
- (Burkina Faso) Salif Nogo
- (Romania) Mihai Onicaș
- (Romania) Vasile Rahoveanu
- (Romania) Ilie Savu
- (Romania) Horațiu Sătmar
- (Romania) Adrian Stoicov
- (Romania) Andrei Szabados
- (Romania) Elek Személy
- (Romania) Árpád Szűcs
- (Romania) Petru Șchiopu
- (Romania) Costel Uilecan
- (Romania) János Vajda
- (Romania) Ioan Varga
- (Romania) Andrei Vaștag
- (Romania) Florea Văetuș
- (Romania) Gelu Velici

== Former managers ==
- (Romania) Stere Zeană (1962–1964)
- (Romania) Ladislau Vlad (1972–1974)
- (Romania) Nicolae Oaidă (1974)
- (Romania) Traian Ivănescu (1975–1976)
- (Romania) Ioan Petcu (1999)
- (Romania) Gheorghe Barbu (2006–2010)
- (Romania) Romulus Gabor (2011–2012)
- (Romania) Viorel Tănase (2016–2017)
- (Romania) Ioan Petcu (2018–2019)
- (Romania) Romulus Gabor (2019)
