= Ioan Bogdan (footballer) =

Romanian footballer

Personal information
- Date of birth: 26 January 1956 (age 70)
- Place of birth: Arad, Romania
- Position: Defender

Youth career
- Recolta Vladimirescu
- 1969–1975: UTA Arad

Senior career*
Years	Team	Apps	(Gls)
1975–1977	Aurul Brad		
1977	UTA Arad	0	(0)
1978	Aurul Brad		
1978–1985	Corvinul Hunedoara	212	(1)
1985–1987	UTA Arad		
- Strungul Arad

International career
1983	Romania Olympic	3	(0)
1982–1983	Romania	9	(0)
- * Club domestic league appearances and goals

Ioan Bogdan (born 26 January 1956) is a Romanian former footballer who played as a defender.

== Club career ==
Bogdan, nicknamed "Roger", was born on 26 January 1956 in Arad, Romania, but grew up in the Vladimirescu commune where he started playing junior-level football at local club Recolta. Afterwards he went to UTA Arad where he worked with coaches Zoltan Farmati and Andrei Mercea among others. In 1975 he started his senior career at Aurul Brad in Divizia C, helping the team earn promotion to Divizia B. In 1977 he returned to UTA but did not play in any games, thus in 1978 he went back to Aurul.

Bogdan switched teams again when he signed for Corvinul Hunedoara where he made his Divizia A debut on 24 August 1978 under coach Ilie Savu in a 1–0 away loss to Politehnica Iași. The team was relegated at the end of his first season but he stayed with the club, helping it get promoted back to the first league, together with coach Mircea Lucescu. The highlights of his time spent with Corvinul were a third place in the 1981–82 Divizia A and appearing in four games in the 1982–83 UEFA Cup as they got past Grazer AK in the first round, being eliminated in the following one by FK Sarajevo. He made his last Divizia A appearance on 19 June 1985 in a 2–1 home win over Universitatea Craiova, totaling 181 matches with one goal scored against Farul Constanța in the competition, all of them for Corvinul.

In 1985 he returned to UTA in Divizia B, working with coach Nicolae Dumitrescu, but his two-season spell was rather unsuccessful, as they failed to get promoted to the first league. He ended his career at Strungul Arad.

== International career ==
Bogdan played nine matches for Romania, making his debut on 14 April 1982 under coach Mircea Lucescu in a friendly that ended with a 2–1 away victory against Bulgaria. His following game was a 3–1 win over Cyprus in the Euro 1984 qualifiers. Bogdan's last seven games were friendlies, the last one taking place on 1 June 1983 in a 1–0 away loss to Yugoslavia.

He also played three games for Romania's Olympic team in the 1984 Summer Olympics qualifiers.

== Personal life ==
In 2022, Bogdan received the Honorary Citizen of Hunedoara title.

== Honours ==
Aurul Brad

- Divizia C: 1975–76

Corvinul Hunedoara

- Divizia B: 1979–80
