= Rareș Vârtic =

Romanian footballer

Personal information
- Full name: Rareș Bogdan Vârtic
- Date of birth: 9 June 1985 (age 41)
- Place of birth: Târgu Mureș, Romania
- Height: 1.87 m (6 ft 1 1/2 in)
- Position: Midfielder

Youth career
- 1995–2004: Sporting Pitești

Senior career*
Years	Team	Apps	(Gls)
2004–2005	ASA Târgu Mureş	14	(2)
2005–2006	Știința Toplița	16	(2)
2006–2009	Mureșul Deva	42	(3)
2009–2011	FCM Târgu Mureș	28	(2)
2011–2012	CS Turnu Severin	20	(0)
2012–2014	ASA Târgu Mureș	31	(1)

Managerial career
- 2014–: Juvenes Târgu Mureș (youth)
- * Club domestic league appearances and goals as of 21 June 2016

Rareș Vârtic (born 9 June 1985) is a former Romanian football midfielder.
