= Ladislau Vlad =

Romanian professional footballer

Personal information
- Date of birth: 25 March 1930
- Place of birth: Oradea, Romania
- Date of death: 18 March 2013 (aged 82)
- Place of death: Hunedoara, Romania
- Position: Midfielder

Youth career
- 1945–1949: IC Oradea

Senior career*
| Years | Team | Apps | (Gls) |
| 1950 | Metalul Baia Mare | | |
| 1951–1953 | Câmpulung Moldovenesc | 18 | (0) |
| 1953 | CCA București | 13 | (0) |
| 1954–1958 | Progresul Oradea | 45 | (2) |
| 1958–1962 | Baia Mare | | |
| 1962–1963 | Crișana Oradea | 9 | (1) |
| 1963–1965 | Crișul Oradea | 3 | (0) |
| Total | | 88 | (3) |

Managerial career
- 1966–1967: Crișul Oradea (assistant)
- 1969: Crișul Oradea (assistant)
- 1970–1971: Crișul Oradea
- 1970–1971: Crișul Oradea (assistant)
- 1972: Crișul Oradea
- 1972–1974: Mureșul Deva
- 1974: Bihor Oradea
- 1975–1976: Mureșul Deva
- 1976–1977: Corvinul Hunedoara
- 1977–1979: Victoria Călan
- 1979–1981: Aurul Brad
- 1981–1982: Corvinul Hunedoara (technical director)
- 1982–1983: Jiul Petroșani
- 1983: Aurul Brad
- 1984: Corvinul Hunedoara
- 1987: Jiul Petroșani
- 1991–1992: Diósgyőr
- * Club domestic league appearances and goals as of 2 July 2020

Ladislau "Laci" Vlad (25 March 1930 – 18 March 2013) was a Romanian professional footballer and manager of Hungarian ethnicity. He played for teams such as Metalul Baia Mare, CA Câmpulung Moldovenesc, CCA București, Progresul/Crișana Oradea and Crișul Oradea, after retirement, working as a manager for Mureșul Deva, Bihor Oradea, Corvinul Hunedoara or Jiul Petroșani, among others. He worked for Diósgyőr in the 1991–92 Nemzeti Bajnokság I season.

Ladislau Vlad played in 116 Divizia A matches and won the 1956 Cupa României with Progresul Oradea.

== Honours ==
=== Player ===
Câmpulung Moldovenesc

- Divizia B: 1951

CCA București

- Cupa României: runner-up 1953

Progresul Oradea

- Divizia B: 1955
- Cupa României: 1956; runner-up 1955

Baia Mare

- Cupa României: runner-up 1958–59

=== Manager ===
Bihor Oradea

- Divizia B: 1970–71

Mureșul Deva

- Divizia C: 1972–73
