= 1956 Cupa României =

Tournament details
- Country: Romania

Final positions
- Champions: Progresul Oradea
- Runners-up: Energia Câmpia Turzii

The 1956 Cupa României was the 19th edition of Romania's most prestigious football cup competition.

The title was won by Progresul Oradea against Energia Câmpia Turzii.

== Format ==
The competition is an annual knockout tournament.

In the first round proper, two pots were made, first pot with Divizia A teams and other teams till 16 and the second pot with the rest of teams qualified in this phase. First pot teams will play Away. Each tie is played as a single leg.

If a match is drawn after 90 minutes, the game goes in extra time, and if the scored is still tight after 120 minutes, the team who plays away will qualify.

In case the teams are from same city, there a replay will be played.

In case the teams play in the final, there a replay will be played.

From the first edition, the teams from Divizia A entered in competition in sixteen finals, rule which remained till today.

== First round proper ==
Team 1	Score	Team 2
13 September 1956
Locomotiva Arad (Div. B)	2–5	(Div. A) Locomotiva Timișoara
Progresul Bistriţa (Div. C)	1–2	(Div. B) Energia Câmpia Turzii
Dinamo Bârlad (Div. B)	0–4	(Div. A) CCA București
Dinamo 6 București (Div. B)	2–0	(Div. B) Progresul CPCS București
Locomotiva Cluj (Div. B)	1–1 (a.e.t.)	(Div. A) Progresul Oradea
Locomotiva Constanța (Div. B)	0–1	(Div. A) Progresul București
Energia Metalul Galaţi (Div. C)	1–0	(Div. B) Progresul Focşani
Energia Mediaş (Div. B)	0–1	(Div. A) Energia Ploiești
Flacăra Moreni (Div. B)	0–5	(Div. A) Locomotiva București
Energia 1 Mai Ploieşti (Div. B)	1–5	(Div. A) Dinamo București
Energia Reșița (Div. C)	1–2 (a.e.t.)	(Div. A) Flamura Roșie Arad
Progresul Sibiu (Div. B)	2–0	(Div. A) Energia Petroșani
Steagul Roșu Orașul Stalin (Div. B)	2–1	(Div. A) Dinamo Orașul Stalin
Recolta Târgu Mureș (Div. B)	0–0 (a.e.t.)	(Div. A) Știința Cluj
Locomotiva Turnu Severin (Div. B)	3–1	(Div. A) Ştiinţa Timişoara
20 September 1956
Flamura Roşie Burdujeni (Div. B)	4–4 (a.e.t.)	(Div. A) Dinamo Bacău

== Second round proper ==
Team 1	Score	Team 2
18 October 1956
Dinamo 6 București	0–5	Locomotiva București
Energia Câmpia Turzii	3–2 (a.e.t.)	Progresul București
Energia Metalul Galaţi	3–0	Dinamo Bacău
Progresul Sibiu	1–3	Energia Ploiești
Locomotiva Timișoara	2–1	Flamura Roșie Arad
Locomotiva Turnu Severin	1–3	Progresul Oradea
15 November 1956
Steagul Roşu Oraşul Stalin	4–3	Dinamo București
22 November 1956
Știința Cluj	1–5	CCA București

== Quarter-finals ==
Team 1	Score	Team 2
25 November 1956
Steagul Roşu Oraşul Stalin	1–1 (a.e.t.)	Progresul Oradea
Locomotiva București	3–1 (a.e.t.)	Energia Ploiești
Energia Câmpia Turzii	1–0	Locomotiva Timișoara
Energia Metalul Galaţi	1–8	CCA București

== Semi-finals ==
Team 1	Score	Team 2
2 December 1956
CCA București	2–2 (a.e.t.)	Progresul Oradea
6 December 1956
Energia Câmpia Turzii	2–0	Locomotiva București

== Final ==
9 December 1956
13:30 EET

Progresul Oradea	2–0	Energia Câmpia Turzii
Köszegi 53'; Vlad 68'	Report

Republicii, Bucharest
Attendance: 30,000
Referee: Dumitru Schulder (Bucharest)

Cupa României 1956 winners

1st title
