= FC Corvinul Hunedoara =

Association football club in Hunedoara

Corvinul Hunedoara
- Full name: Asociaţia Club Sportiv FC Corvinul Hunedoara 1921
- Nicknames: Corbii (The Ravens); Corviniștii (The Corvins); Alb-albaștrii (The White and Blues); Hunedorenii (The People of Hunedoara); Echipa de sub furnale (The Team Under the Blast Furnaces); Oțelarii (The Steelworkers)
- Short name: Corvinul
- Founded: 1921; 105 years ago as Fero Sport Hunedoara
- Ground: Complexul Sportiv Corvinul/ Petre Libardi
- Capacity: 16,500 (3,000 seated)/ 15,500
- Owners: Hunedoara Municipality; Hunedoara County Council
- Chairman: Sorin Cimpoca
- Head coach: Florin Maxim
- League: Liga I
- 2025–26: Liga II, 1st of 22 (promoted)
- Website: fccorvinul1921.ro
Home colours	Away colours	Third colours

Asociaţia Club Sportiv FC Corvinul Hunedoara 1921 (Romanian pronunciation: [huneˈdo̯ara]), commonly known as Corvinul Hunedoara or simply Corvinul, is a Romanian professional football club based in the city of Hunedoara, Hunedoara County, that competes in the Liga I.

Founded in 1921 as Fero Sport Hunedoara, the club bore various names over time, but stuck with Corvinul, inspired by the history of the Hunyadi family (Romanian: Familia Corvinilor) and the local Corvin Castle. Under this name, the team achieved its best performances during the 1980s, when it was a constant appearance in the top flight. Between 1979 and 1982, Corvinul was coached by Mircea Lucescu, who would go on to become one of the most successful Romanian managers.

Following the fall of communism, Corvinul relegated to the Divizia B in 1992 and spent 34 consecutive seasons outside of the top flight. The club faced financial and identity issues in the 20th century, but in 2021 its brand was recovered by the Municipality of Hunedoara. They will return to Liga I for the 2026–27 season having won the previous edition of Liga II.

== History ==
=== The Pride of the Iron Workers (1921–1953) ===
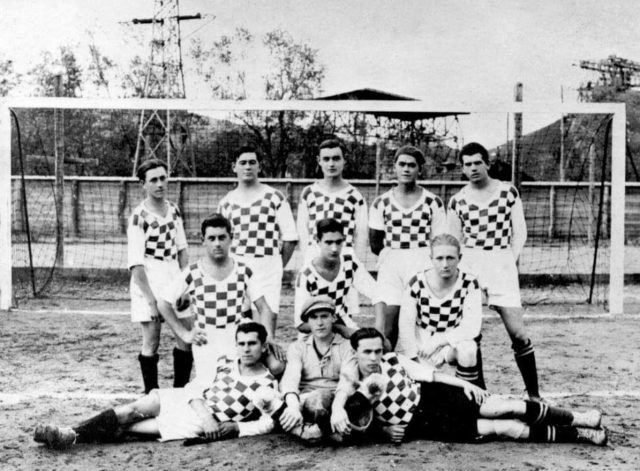
UF Hunedoara in 1930.

Football has been practiced in Hunedoara, in an unorganized way, since the early 1900s, being brought by young locals which were studying in the big cities of the country or abroad, as happened with most of the football beginnings in Transylvania.

The year 1921 will be the first one in which a Football Championship was organized between the borders of the Kingdom of Romania, a championship which was running as a tournament with regional leagues and a national final stage. In the same year, in Hunedoara, on the initiative of several sports enthusiasts, led by Ludovic Rimbaș was established the first organized football team, Fero Sport Hunedoara. The new football club operated under the patronage of the local Iron Plant. Iosif Onciu (then director of the Iron Plant) was elected president, and Ludovic Rimbaș held both the position of secretary of the club and the manager of the team. The company's headquarters were in the former premises of the "Red Union" in Severin Street.

Hunedoara's first organized football team aroused great enthusiasm among the locals, but especially among the employees of the Iron Plant, who agreed to each contribute 1% of their salary to support the new football team. At the same time, the footballers were regularly awarded by the management of the Plant and had priority in employment. Thus, from the very beginning, the football team had a close connection with the local Iron Plant, which later became a Steel Plant.

From 1924, the team changed its name to U.F.H (Uzinele de Fier Hunedoara) and in 1936, to Iancu Corvin Hunedoara. During the World War II the situation was very difficult, the team played on various makeshift grounds, more or less arranged. The club's financial situation was particularly difficult, but the club survived. In 1943, the team's name returned to U.F.H. (Uzinele de Fier Hunedoara). With the reorganization of Romania under the communist regime, the team took over the new name of the old Iron Plant, I.S.S. Hunedoara (Întreprinderile Siderurgice de Stat Hunedoara). In the same year, the football team played in the third tier (Divzia C) under the name I.M.S. Hunedoara (Întreprinderea Muncitorească Siderurgică Hunedoara) and a year later, the club's management was taken over by the union within the steel unit, the name changed again and became Metalul Hunedoara.

In 1953, Metalul was promoted to the top-flight (Divizia A) for the first time, a moment that remained in history as the first time when a football club based in the “Steel City” crossed the threshold of the first tier. In that season, Hunedoara finished on the first place in the 2nd Series, 4 points away from the runners-up, another team financially supported by the Steel Industry of Romania, Metalul Câmpia Turzii.

=== A Period of Struggles (1954–1975) ===
Chart showing the progress of Corvinul's league finishes from 1947 until present.

Metalul fought proudly in its first top-flight season (1954), but finally relegated after it was ranked 11th of 14, first team placed under the relegation line. The 1950s continued with five consecutive appearances in the Second Division: (1955 – 6th, 1956 – 2nd, 1957–58 – 2nd, 1958–59 – 4th and 1959–60 – 1st). In 1956 Metalul Hunedoara was renamed as Energia Hunedoara, but in 1958 the named was changed again, this time in Corvinul Hunedoara. The football club based in Hunedoara frequently changed its name between 1921 and 1958 in order to create a personalized identity, something more special, that will remain in people's minds and be directly associated with Hunedoara. Even if the name Corvinul did not catch on immediately, the later performances and its uniqueness in the Romanian football landscape stuck it to the football club based in Hunedoara.

Corvinul promoted to Divizia A in the summer of 1960, and it seemed that a new era was starting "under the blast furnaces", but again, the team relegated after only one season in the top-flight after it was ranked the last, out of 14 teams. The situation began to become dramatic after another year, when Corvinul made one of its worst seasons and was ranked the last in the Divizia B, relegating down to the third tier, for the first time in the last decade. After the relegation, the local authorities decided to change again the name, because Corvinul was an unlucky choice and renamed the club as Siderurgistul Hunedoara, again financially supported by the Iron Plant. Iron Plant of Hunedoara was not as big as Galați steel works, so automatically had less financial strength. As a result, Siderurgistul (again Metalul Hunedoara since 1964) played for no less than five consecutive seasons in the Divizia C. Finally, the Steelworkers earned promotion back to the second division at the end of the 1966–67 campaign, finishing top of the table in the West Series, four points ahead of another factory team, Tractorul Brașov. The squad, coached by Gheorghe Bărbulescu and Abagiu Pîrvu, included Dobîndă, Stainer, Mercea, Vlad, Szekely, Tătaru, Ceaușu, Grozescu, Olaru, Homeghi, Pîrvu, Păunescu, Popa, Găceanu, Ciocănaru, Socol, Cristescu, Molnar, and Hristos Iorgos.

From the middle 1960s to the middle 1970s, Metalul Hunedoara, then renamed again as Corvinul Hunedoara (in 1970) settled as an important Divizia B side, ranking between 4th and 13th place, but never with really important chances of promotion.

=== Golden Age of Corvinul (1975–1990) ===
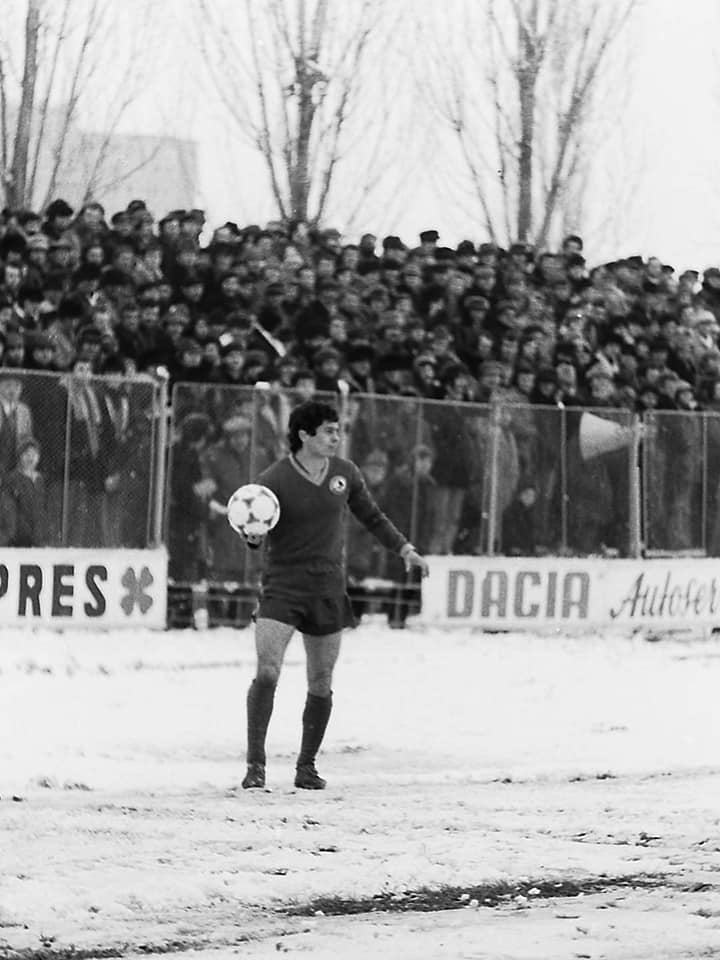
Mircea Lucescu at Corvinul in the early 1980s.

At the end of the 1975–76, Corvinul promoted back to Divizia A, after 15 years of absence and struggles. It was the very beginning of Hunedoara ascension in the Romanian football. In the first half of the season, the team was managed by Ladislau Vlad and Constantin Toma, then in the second half by Ilie Savu, Victor Cojocaru and Remus Vlad. The squad was composed of the following players: Gheorghe Bologan, Romulus Cocu and Emeric Moritz – Ioan Stan, Nicolae Jurcă, Remus Vlad, Vasile Ghiță, Dorin Nicșa, Ioan Petcu, Alexe Lazăr, Marian Deacu, Octavian Cojocaru, Virgil Stoica, Ilie Ologu, Clemen Șureghin, Eremia Șumulanschi, Ioan Bucur, Ioan Năstase, Petre Șchiopu, Gheorghe Albu, Vasile Dina, Gheorghe Georgescu, Florea Văetuș and Dan Pintilie.

In 1975 the football section was separated from the Corvinul Sports Club and the team was renamed as FC Corvinul. It was the third football club in Romania that adopted the "FC" abbreviation in its name, after FC Argeș Pitești and FC Bihor Oradea. During the 1970s, Hunedoara's people passion for football grew up at the same time with the city's development. The Steel Plant was a force in the national industry. Starting with the spring of 1976, young footballers of the club such as Dorin Nicșa, Ioan Petcu, Florea Văetuș, Gheorghe Albu or Mihai Viespe begin to be summoned to the national groups of juniors and youth. A natural fact, especially since, at the end of the 1976–77 season, Corvinul Reserves Squad was ranked on an honorable 3rd place in the championship.

In the same year 1976, Gelu Simoc (one of the 28 founding members of FC Corvinul Hunedoara, at that time head of the Personal Service within the Hunedoara Steel Plant) managed to convince Radu Nunweiller (a star of the Romanian football at that moment) to come to Hunedoara, thinking that, if, for years in a row, the Romania national football team was built, practically around him, the same could have happened in Hunedoara. However, the experience of the Dinamo player would have been extremely useful for the team in its third appearance in the First Division. A year later, also at the end of his career, Mircea Lucescu was also persuaded to come to Hunedoara. The director of the Steel Plant at the time, Sabin Faur, led the final negotiations. However, the main merit for Lucescu's arrival in Hunedoara had the same man, Gelu Simoc. After a 14th place (1976–77) and an 8th place (1977–78), Corvinul relegated back to the second tier, at the end of the 1978–79 season. After the match in which "the Steelworkers" lost any chance of remaining in the top-flight, Mircea Lucescu had one of the most pleasant "shocks" of his life when he was taken out from the stadium on arms and led in cheers and encouragement to his home by the fans, like a hero, although the team had just relegated.

The club's youth teams performed at a high level; then Mircea Lucescu assumed the role of manager and convinced Florea Dumitrache, another legend of the Romania national football team of the 1970s, to sign with Corvinul. In the following years, the "square" formed of Radu Nunweiller – Florea Dumitrache – Remus Vlad – Mircea Lucescu served as a support for the young footballers, among them: Michael Klein, Romulus Gabor, Ioan Andone, Mircea Rednic and others. Corvinul promoted back to Divizia A after only one season in the second league, winning its series. At the end of the 1980–81 season, Corvinul was ranked 6th, then in the following season "the Ravens" achieved their best performance, a 3rd place. During that season, the team based in Hunedoara was the leader of the league for a period and in the first squad 9 players were born in Hunedoara County. The squad was managed by Mircea Lucescu (player and manager) and was formed by following players: Niculai Alexa, Marian Ioniță – Ioan Andone, Mircea Rednic, Ioan Bogdan, Dumitru Gălan, Florin Dubinciuc, Michael Klein, Constantin Dumitriu, Victor Oncu, Dorin Nicșa, Dorin Mateuț, Ioan Petcu, Romulus Gabor, Florea Văetuș, Florea Dumitrache and Mircea Lucescu.

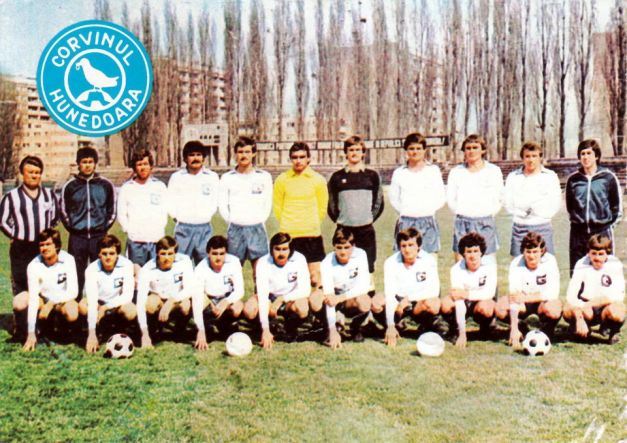
Corvinul squad in the 1981–82 season.

As a result of this performance, FC Corvinul qualified for the 1982–83 UEFA Cup season. "The White and Blues" beat Austrian side Grazer AK (3–1 on aggregate) in the First Round, but in the second round lost to Yugoslavian side FK Sarajevo (4–8 on aggregate). During the 1980s, Corvinul became known in Romanian football, "Hunedorenii" were well known as a very good and offensive team on their home ground, where over this decade obtain unprecedented results, among them: 9–0 vs. Rapid București, 8–0 vs. Politehnica Iași or 3–1 vs. Steaua București, this last one was obtained weeks before Steaua achieved its best performance, winning the 1986 European Cup Final, against FC Barcelona. During "Jackie" Ionescu tenure as manager of the team (1984–1986), was born a phrase that stuck with Corvinul over time, "norma hunedoareană" (Hunedoara's standard), phrase that appear from Corvinul's offensive style of football, "the Ravens" scoring in general at least three goals on their home ground. Despite success on its home ground, Corvinul struggled as a team on away ground, when also registered its biggest defeat, 0–11 vs. Steaua București, in 1988.

In 1988 the flame began to go out, even though the reputed manager and teacher Constantin "Titi" Ardeleanu tried a refreshment of the squad. Ardeleanu's words from that time, remained deeply inscribed in the history wall of the club: "Corvinul is an important name in the Romanian football. Its contribution to the latest great international successes is undeniable! Present in many national teams, the footballers of Hunedoara gave the exact measure of their value, and Corvinul is one of the first teams in the country!" Between 1982 and 1990, the team based in Hunedoara obtained the following rankings: 1982–83 – 6th, 1983–84 – 12th, 1984–85 – 8th, 1985–86 – 5th, 1986–87 – 9th, 1987–88 – 7th, 1988–89 – 15th and 1989–90 – 8th.

=== The Fall of a Legendary Club (1990–2004) ===
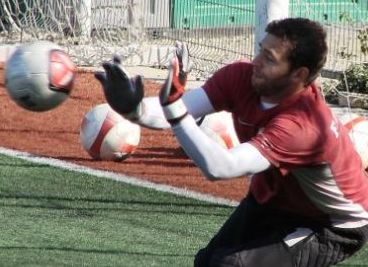
Bogdan Lobonț, a goalkeeper raised by Corvinul.

The 1990s represent the fall of communism in Romania and the start of a new beginning for the country, but for the iron and mining industries, two of the engines of the 1970s and 1980s economy was the beginning of the end. Hunedoara County was one of the most affected regions due to its economy, which was based exactly on this two sectors of activity. The downfall of the economy affected directly the two most important clubs of the county Corvinul and Jiul Petroșani. If Jiul continued to struggle between the top two leagues for the next approximately 15 years, Corvinul played in the top-flight for only two more seasons: 1990–91 and 1991–92, but with result below expectations, ranking 14th and 18th, this latest result meant automatically the relegation to Divizia B, for the first time in the latest 12 years.

Back in the second division, "the Ravens" accused the shock of relegation and obtained two weak rankings, in the middle and second half of the table, then the 1994–95 season it seemed to be their chance to save and relaunch the club. "The White and Blues" finished the championship as runners-up in their series and qualified for the promotion play-off, where they lost 0–1 against Sportul Studențesc București. In the same period, the productive Youth Center of Corvinul gave to the Romanian football a new important name, Bogdan Lobonț, who will be sold to Rapid București, two years later. Back in the second division, Corvinul results were modest and the financial support of the Iron Plant less and less consistent, thus between 1996 and 1999, the team settled in the middle of the table, between 7th and 10th place.

Apart from its financial and sportive situation, Youth Center of Corvinul continue to "produce" important players, among them Bogdan Andone, Decebal Gheară or Bogdan Apostu, thus, with a new generation and some financial support from the Municipality of Hunedoara, Corvinul fight for a new promotion, but end the 1999–2000 season only on the 3rd place, behind Gaz Metan Mediaș and ARO Câmpulung. This was the last season in which the team based in Hunedoara fought for promotion to the top-flight. Next season, "the Ravens" relegated to Divizia C, for the first time in the last 34 years, but promoted back after one season. For the next four seasons, Corvinul played in the second division, but at its best was ranked 7th, finally in the autumn of 2004 the club was excluded from all competitions by the Romanian Football Federation because of the debts accumulated over the years.

=== Successors and processes (2005–2021) ===
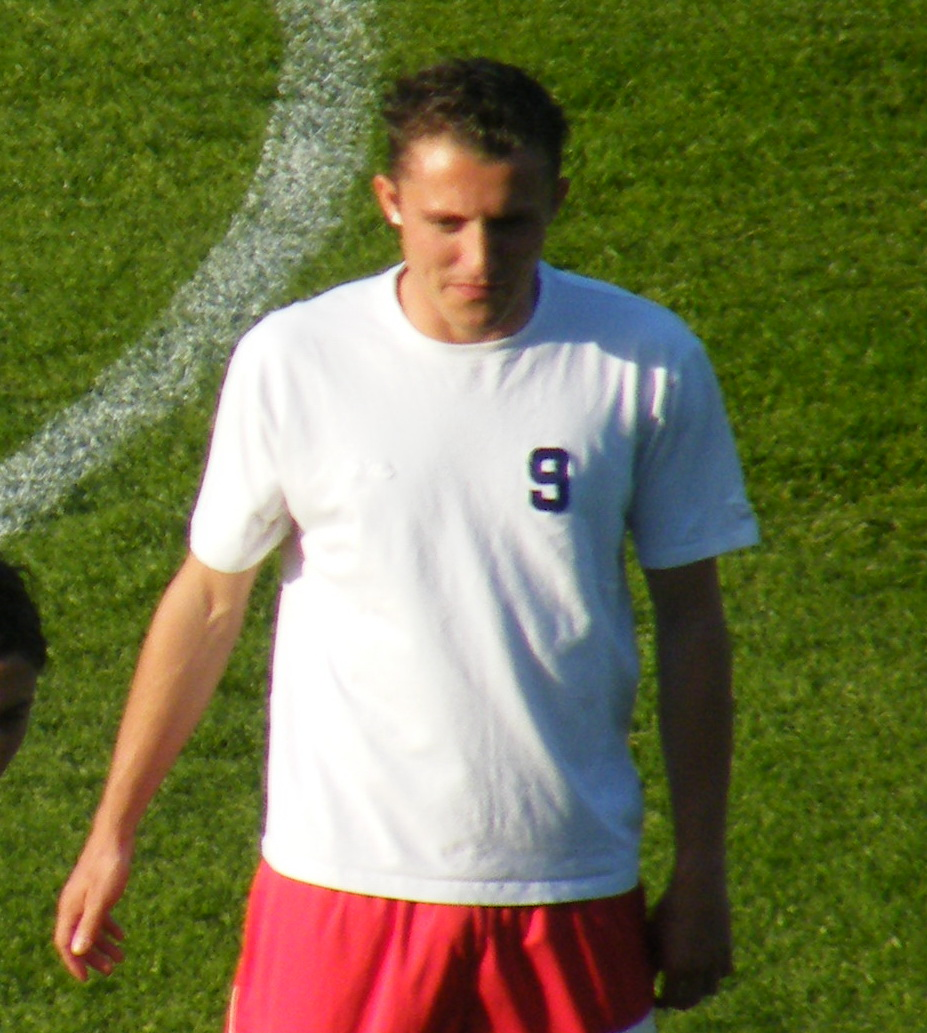
Bogdan Apostu, former player of Corvinul, now a football agent and a person involved in the recovery of the club's brand.

Between 2004 and 2016 the club had no senior squads registered to play in any Romanian Football Federation competition, and was kept alive only by one youth squad that played in the County Championship. In 2016, Hunedoara Court decided that FC Corvinul will be dissolved for a debt of approx. 160,500$, even though the club has managed to postpone this sentence since 2008, in the light of a lawsuit won against Rapid București regarding Bogdan Lobonț transfer to Ajax. Corvinul should have collected the amount of 900,000$, but Rapid also entered in bankruptcy, so Hunedoara Court considered that Corvinul has no way to collect the money and must enter in liquidation.

In 2005, the last president of FC Corvinul, Mircea Alic, registered Corvinul's brand and subsequently sold it to Octavian Marian, a businessman from Bucharest, for approx. 45,000€. In the same year, Municipality of Hunedoara founded SC Corvinul 2005 Hunedoara, the club bought its place in the second division from CS Deva, but it had a short life, the financial problems appeared again and in 2008, the new club was also dissolved. In the summer of 2009 a new successor club was founded, FC Hunedoara, a club which played many consecutive seasons in the Liga III and for four years in a row missed promotion to Liga II by a slight margin. In the summer of 2016, this entity was excluded as well from Liga III due to financial problems. Relegated in the County League, FC Hunedoara was re-organized as CS Hunedoara and promoted back.

Between 2005 and 2021, no one of the successor clubs could use FC Corvinul brand, despite the fact that the original club was a dormant one, until 2016 when Hunedoara Court decided that FC Corvinul must enter in liquidation, officially. The main issue was that Mircea Alic registered the brand, then sold it to Octavian Marian for 47.000 EUR. Competition wise, Corvinul 2005, FC Hunedoara and CS Hunedoara were the successors of FC Corvinul. These entities used the white and blue colors, Michael Klein Stadium as a home ground and were also cheered by the fans and ultras groups dedicated to the original FC Corvinul.

=== Return of the Corvinul identity (2021–present) ===
In the summer of 2021, during the club's centenary year, the historic FC Corvinul 1921 brand was acquired for approximately €47,000 from Octavian Marian. Former players and personalities associated with Corvinul, including Ioan Andone, Mircea Lucescu, Mircea Rednic and Bogdan Apostu, supported the campaign, while supporters also raised funds for the acquisition.

In 2022, CS Hunedoara was renamed CS Corvinul 1921 Hunedoara and began competing under the traditional Corvinul identity. Under head coach Florin Maxim, the club earned promotion to Liga II and quickly became one of the strongest teams in the second tier.

In the 2023–24 season, Corvinul finished second in the Liga II play-off, although it was ineligible for promotion because of its public-law status. The club nevertheless produced a historic run in the 2023–24 Cupa României, defeating several top-flight opponents and reaching the final for the first time in its history. On 15 May 2024, Corvinul drew 2–2 with Oțelul Galați at the Municipal Stadium in Sibiu before winning the penalty shoot-out 3–2, securing the first Cupa României trophy in the club's history.

The cup triumph qualified Corvinul for European competition in 2024–25. The Hunedoara side began in the first qualifying round of the Europa League and later continued in the UEFA Conference League, marking the club's return to European football after more than four decades. Corvinul also contested the 2024 Supercupa României, losing 0–3 to FCSB.

During the summer of 2024, the club attempted to change its legal structure in order to become eligible for promotion to the top flight. Although the FRF legal department initially issued a favourable opinion, the federation ultimately rejected the proposed transfer for the 2024–25 season because the procedure could not be completed in time following appeals from other Liga II clubs. Corvinul consequently remained a public-law club throughout the 2024–25 season.

The restructuring was successfully completed the following summer. On 18 July 2025, the Executive Committee of the Romanian Football Federation approved the transfer of the sporting activity and competition rights from the public entity Clubul Sportiv Corvinul 1921 Hunedoara to the private-law association Asociația Club Sportiv F.C. Corvinul Hunedoara 1921. The new structure therefore became eligible for promotion to SuperLiga.

Corvinul dominated the 2025–26 season, completing the 21-match regular season undefeated with 16 wins and five draws and entering the promotion play-off with a nine-point lead over second-placed Sepsi OSK. On 7 May 2026, a 2–0 victory over FC Voluntari mathematically secured promotion to the top flight, and the club subsequently secured the Liga II championship before finishing the season with 69 points. The promotion returned Corvinul Hunedoara to the Romanian top division for the first time since the historic club's relegation in 1992.

== Grounds ==
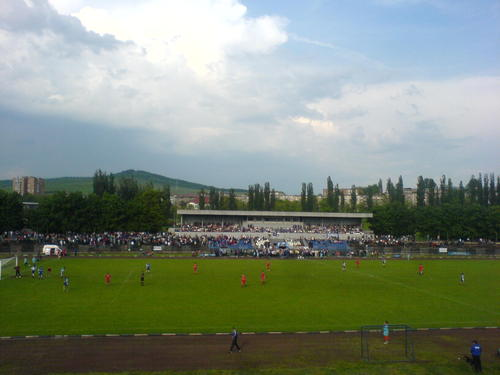
Michael Klein Stadium, home ground of Corvinul Hunedoara.

In its first years of existence, Fero Sport Hunedoara played its home matches on the Poarta Zgurii Stadium, a ground with a capacity of only 400–500 people, two locker rooms, a warehouse and a few small annexes. Enough for a town that, at the time, had only about 4,000 inhabitants. During the World War II, the stadium was occupied by the Soviet Army, thus the football team moved its home matches on Hășdat Stadium, considered for many organizational reasons to be inappropriate. The locker rooms were in some annexes near the Corvin Castle, and the footballers were transported to the Hășdat Stadium by carts or trucks.

During the 1950s, the Iron Plant was already transformed into a real Steel Plant and a new city was "raising" in the eastern zone of the old town. The new city needed a new sports base, a stage built mainly for the football team, the old stadium, known during this period as Metalul Stadium or Energia Stadium was considered obsolete.

On 2 May 1960, Corvinul Sports Complex was opened with a football match between Corvinul and CFR Arad, won by the hosts with 1–0. The new stadium had a capacity of 16,000 people. In the mid-1990s, the stadium was renamed as Michael Klein Stadium, in the honour of Michael Klein, former footballer of "the Ravens" and Romanian national team, who died at only 33 years old, during a training of his team from that moment, Bayer Uerdingen. In 2006, the stadium was renovated and 3,000 seats were mounted.

== Honours ==
=== Domestic ===
==== Leagues ====
- Divizia A / Liga I
  - Best finish: 3rd 1981–82
- Divizia B / Liga II
  - Winners (5): 1953, 1959–60, 1975–76, 1979–80, 2025–26
  - Runners-up (4): 1956, 1957–58, 1994–95, 2023–24
- Divizia C / Liga III
  - Winners (4): 1966–67, 2001–02, 2021–22, 2022–23
  - Runners-up (3): 1965–66, 2011–12, 2012–13
- Liga IV – Hunedoara County
  - Winners (2): 2009–10, 2017–18

=== Cups ===
- Cupa României
  - Winners (1): 2023–24
- Supercupa României
  - Runners-up (1): 2024

== European record ==
=== Overall Record ===
Competition	S	P	W	D	L	GF	GA	GD
UEFA Europa League / UEFA Cup	2	8	2	3	3	12	12	0
UEFA Conference League	1	2	0	0	2	2	8	–6
Total	3	10	2	3	5	14	20	–6

=== Matches ===
Season	Competition	Round	Club	Home	Away	Agg
1982–83	UEFA Cup	1R	(Austria) Grazer AK	3–0	1–1	4–1
1982–83	UEFA Cup	2R	(Socialist Federal Republic of Yugoslavia) Sarajevo	4–4	0–4	4–8
2024–25	UEFA Europa League	1QR	(Hungary) Paks	0–2	4–0	4–2
2024–25	UEFA Europa League	2QR	(Croatia) Rijeka	0–0	0–1	0–1
2024–25	UEFA Conference League	3QR	(Kazakhstan) Astana	1–2	1–6	2–8

== Players ==
=== First team squad ===
As of 9 October 2026

Note: Flags indicate national team as defined under FIFA eligibility rules; some limited exceptions apply. Players may hold more than one non-FIFA nationality.

No.	Pos.	Nation	Player
5	DF	JOR	Mohammad Abualnadi
8	MF	ROU	Dragoș Albu
9	FW	PER	Renato Espinosa
10	MF	ROU	Alexandru Neacșa (Vice-captain)
11	MF	BRA	Roger
12	GK	ROU	Adrian Frănculescu (on loan from CFR Cluj)
13	DF	ROU	Flavius Iacob (Captain)
14	MF	NGR	Muhammed Hayatu
15	DF	SRB	Mihajlo Ivančević
16	MF	ROU	Gabriel Apur
17	MF	ROU	Eduard Cioază
18	DF	ROU	Florin Ilie (4th captain)
19	MF	ROU	Nicolae Pîrvulescu (3rd captain)

No.	Pos.	Nation	Player
20	MF	POR	Sérgio Ribeiro
21	GK	ROU	Codruț Sandu (on loan from Dinamo București)
22	MF	SVK	Andrej Fábry
23	MF	MDA	Ion Cărăruș
29	FW	NGR	Emmanuel Okoro
30	DF	ROU	Antoniu Manolache
32	FW	ARG	Ángel Gillard
33	GK	ROU	Silviu Drîngă
41	MF	ROU	Mario Bratu
47	FW	NGR	Gideon Goodlad
70	MF	ROU	Ronaldo Deaconu
97	MF	ROU	Denis Hrezdac (on loan from UTA Arad)
99	FW	GHA	Emmanuel Yeboah

=== Dual registration ===
Note: Flags indicate national team as defined under FIFA eligibility rules; some limited exceptions apply. Players may hold more than one non-FIFA nationality.

No. / Pos. / Nation / Player; 1 / GK / ROU / Fabio Blaga (at Gloria Bistrița)	No. / Pos. / Nation / Player; 36 / FW / ROU / Denis Zanc (at Gloria Bistrița)

=== Out on loan ===
Note: Flags indicate national team as defined under FIFA eligibility rules; some limited exceptions apply. Players may hold more than one non-FIFA nationality.

No. / Pos. / Nation / Player; — / GK / ROU / Victor Lință (at CSM Deva until 30 June 2027)	No. / Pos. / Nation / Player; — / FW / ROU / Cristian Silvășan (at Unirea Alba Iulia until 30 June 2027)

== Club Officials ==
=== Board of directors ===
Role	Name
Owners	(Romania) Hunedoara Municipality (Romania) Hunedoara County Council
President	(Romania) Sorin Cimpoca
Board Members	(Romania) Ioan Andone (Romania) Gelu Tirian (Romania) Anișor Pârvu (Romania) Ciprian Palcău
Sporting director	(Romania) Anton Heleșteanu
Head of youth development	(Romania) Ioan Petcu
Press Officer	(Romania) Claudiu Sav

=== Current technical staff ===
Role	Name
Head coach	(Romania) Florin Maxim
Assistant coach	(Romania) Dinu Maghici
Goalkeeping coach	(Romania) Eugen Preda
Fitness coach	(Romania) Cătălin Ojiga
Video analyst	(Romania) Cătălin Crăciun
Club Doctor	(Romania) Vasile Chiriac
Masseurs	(Romania) Ovidiu Marin (Japan) Ikko Watanabe
Kit Man	(Romania) Adrian Tomuș

== Chronology of names ==
Name	Period
Corvinul Hunedoara	1921–1943
Uzinele de Fier Hunedoara	1943–1948
I.M.S Hunedoara	1948–1950
Metalul Hunedoara	1950–1956
Energia Hunedoara	1956–1958
Corvinul Hunedoara	1958–1962
Siderurgistul Hunedoara	1962–1964
Metalul Hunedoara	1964–1970
Corvinul Hunedoara	1970–2004
Corvinul 2005 Hunedoara	2005–2008
FC Hunedoara	2009–2016
CS Hunedoara	2016–2022
Corvinul Hunedoara	2022–present

== League and Cup history ==
Season	Tier	Division	Place	Notes	Cupa României
2026–27	1	Liga I	TBD		TBD
2025–26	2	Liga II	1st (C)	Promoted	Play-off round
2024–25	2	Liga II	7th		Play-off round
2023–24	2	Liga II	2nd		Winners
2022–23	3	Liga III (Seria IX)	1st (C)	Promoted	Second Round
2021–22	3	Liga III (Seria IX)	1st (C)		Round of 32
2020–21	3	Liga III (Seria IX)	6th		Second Round
2019–20	3	Liga III (Seria IV)	7th		Second Round
2018–19	3	Liga III (Seria IV)	9th		First Round
2017–18	4	Liga IV (HD)	1st (C)	Promoted	DNQ
2016–17	4	Liga IV (HD)	5th		Second Round
2015–16	3	Liga III (Seria IV)	5th	Withdrew	First Round
2014–15	3	Liga III (Seria IV)	8th		Fourth Round
2013–14	3	Liga III (Seria IV)	3rd		Second Round
2012–13	3	Liga III (Seria V)	2nd		Second Round
2011–12	3	Liga III (Seria V)	2nd		Third Round
2010–11	3	Liga III (Seria V)	6th		Fifth Round
2009–10	4	Liga IV (HD)	1st (C)	Promoted	First Round
2007–08	2	Liga II (Seria II)	18th	Relegated	
2006–07	2	Liga II (Seria II)	10th		Round of 32
2005–06	2	Divizia B (Seria III)	6th		
2004–05	2	Divizia B (Seria III)	16th		
2003–04	2	Divizia B (Seria III)	12th		
2002–03	2	Divizia B (Seria II)	7th		
2001–02	3	Divizia C (Seria VI)	1st (C)	Promoted	
2000–01	2	Divizia B (Seria II)	14th	Relegated	
1999–00	2	Divizia B (Seria II)	3rd		
1998–99	2	Divizia B (Seria II)	10th		
1997–98	2	Divizia B (Seria II)	9th		Round of 32
1996–97	2	Divizia B (Seria II)	7th		
1995–96	2	Divizia B (Seria II)	9th		
1994–95	2	Divizia B (Seria II)	2nd		
1993–94	2	Divizia B (Seria II)	9th		
1992–93	2	Divizia B (Seria II)	13th		
1991–92	1	Divizia A	18th	Relegated	Round of 16
1990–91	1	Divizia A	14th		Round of 32
1989–90	1	Divizia A	8th		Round of 16

== Notable former players ==
The footballers enlisted below have had international cap(s) for their respective countries at junior and/or senior level and/or more than 100 caps for Corvinul Hunedoara.

- (Romania) Ioan Andone
- (Romania) Ioan Bogdan
- (Romania) Alexandru Crețu
- (Romania) Florea Dumitrache
- (Romania) Constantin Dumitriu
- (Romania) Romulus Gabor
- (Romania) Decebal Gheară
- (Romania) Ovidiu Hanganu
- (Romania) Andrei Hergheligiu
- (Romania) Michael Klein
- (Romania) Bogdan Lobonț
- (Romania) Mircea Lucescu
- (Romania) Ioan Mărginean
- (Romania) Dorin Mateuț
- (Romania) Radu Nunweiller
- (Romania) Marius Păcurar
- (Romania) Ioan Petcu
- (Romania) Mircea Rednic
- (Romania) Florea Văetuș
- (Romania) Remus Vlad

== Former managers ==
- (Romania) Ștefan Wetzer (1949–1950)
- (Romania) Ștefan Wetzer (1953)
- (Romania) Rudolf Kotormány (1953–1954)
- (Romania) Ilie Savu (1959–1960)
- (Romania) Colea Vâlcov (1960–1961)
- (Romania) Gheorghe Bărbulescu (1965–1967)
- (Romania) Nicolae Voinescu (1972–1973)
- (Romania) Nicolae Szoboszlay (1973–1974)
- (Romania) Gheorghe Bărbulescu (1974–1975)
- (Romania) Ilie Savu (1975–1976)
- (Romania) Ladislau Vlad (1976–1977)
- (Romania) Ilie Savu (1978)
- (Romania) Mircea Lucescu (1979–1982)
- (Romania) Remus Vlad (1982–1983)
- (Romania) Ladislau Vlad (1983)
- (Romania) Gheorghe Ene (1983)
- (Romania) Ion Nunweiller (1984–1985)
- (Romania) Ion V. Ionescu (1990–1991)
- (Romania) Dudu Georgescu (1992)
- (Romania) Robert Cosmoc (1992–1993)
- (Romania) Ioan Petcu (1995)
- (Romania) Gabriel Stan (1995–1996)
- (Romania) Petre Gigiu (1999)
- (Romania) Victor Roșca (1999–2000)
- (Romania) Romulus Gabor (2004–2005)
- (Romania) Ioan Petcu (2005–2006)
- (Romania) Florea Văetuș (2008)
- (Romania) Ioan Petcu (2008)
- (Romania) Ioan Petcu (2010–2011)
- (Romania) Erik Lincar (2011–2012)
- (Romania) Romulus Gabor (2014–2015)
- (Romania) Dumitru Pătrașcu
- (Romania) Mircea Pătrașcu
