= 2007–08 Liga IV =

66th season of the Liga IV, the fourth tier of the Romanian football league

Liga IV
- Season: 2007–08

The 2007–08 Liga IV was the 66th season of the Liga IV, the fourth tier of the Romanian football league system. The champions of each county association play against one from a neighboring county in a play-off match played on a neutral venue. The winners of the play-off matches promoted to Liga III.

== County leagues ==
- Alba (AB)
- Arad (AR)
- Argeș (AG)
- Bacău (BC)
- Bihor (BH)
- Bistrița-Năsăud (BN)
- Botoșani (BT)
- Brașov (BV)
- Brăila (BR)
- Bucharest (B)
- Buzău (BZ)
- Caraș-Severin (CS)
- Călărași (CL)
- Cluj (CJ)
- Constanța (CT)
- Covasna (CV)
- Dâmbovița (DB)
- Dolj (DJ)
- Galați (GL)
- Giurgiu (GR)
- Gorj (GJ)
- Harghita (HR)
- Hunedoara (HD)
- Ialomița (IL)
- Iași (IS)
- Ilfov (IF)
- Maramureș (MM)
- Mehedinți (MH)
- Mureș (MS)
- Neamț (NT)
- Olt (OT)
- Prahova (PH)
- Satu Mare (SM)
- Sălaj (SJ)
- Sibiu (SB)
- Suceava (SV)
- Teleorman (TR)
- Timiș (TM)
- Tulcea (TL)
- Vaslui (VS)
- Vâlcea (VL)
- Vrancea (VN)

== Promotion play-off ==
The matches was scheduled to be played on 31 May 2008.

Team 1	Score	Team 2
Eforie (CT)	0–0 (5–3 p)	(IF) Corbeanca
Petrolul Berca (BZ)	1–2	(B) Progresul București II
Sporting Tecuci (GL)	1–4	(TL) Săgeata Stejaru
Steaua Brăila (BR)	0–1	(IL) Recolta Gheorghe Lazăr
Interstar Sibiu (SB)	0–2	(BV) Victoria Bod
Moinești (BC)	4–1	(NT) Voința Pângărați
Luceafărul Mihai Eminescu (BT)	1–0	(IS) Iris Iași
Rapid CFR Suceava (SV)	2–1	(MS) Miercurea Nirajului
Viitorul Pucioasa (DB)	2–1	(AG) Albota
Constructorul Bolintin Deal (GR)	0–4	(TR) Petrolul Videle
Hidroelectra Râmnicu Vâlcea (VL)	0–5	(GJ) Jiul Rovinari
Prometeu Craiova (DJ)	3–0	(OT) Știința Dăneasa
Liberty II Marghita (BH)	3–1	(SM) Victoria Carei
Zalău (SJ)	1–0	(MM) Spicul Mocira
CFR Cluj-Napoca II (CJ)	2–0	(BN) Progresul Năsăud
Arieșul Câmpeni (AB)	0–1	(AR) Național Sebiș
ASA Miercurea Ciuc (HR)	0–3	(CV) Zagon
Dacia Orăștie (HD)	1–0	(MH) Victoria Devesel
Progresul Gătaia (TM)	1–0	(CS) Scorillo Caransebeș
Voința Kaproni Gornet (PH)	5–0	(CL) Dunărea Grădiștea
Panciu (VN)	1–0	(VS) Vaslui II

== Leagues standings ==
=== Arad County ===
Pos	Team	Pld	W	D	L	GF	GA	GD	Pts	Qualification or relegation
1	Național Sebiș (C, Q)	34	28	2	4	101	22	+79	86	Qualification for promotion play-off
2	CNM Pâncota	34	27	1	6	88	29	+59	82	
3	Unirea Sântana	34	21	1	12	78	45	+33	64	
4	Păulișana Păuliș	34	18	5	11	79	59	+20	59	
5	Vladimirescu	34	17	3	14	76	66	+10	54	
6	Aqua Vest Arad	34	16	1	17	59	70	−11	49	
7	Regal Horia	34	15	3	16	47	55	−8	48	
8	Partizan Satu Mare	34	15	1	18	83	80	+3	46	
9	Frontiera Curtici	34	14	3	17	61	58	+3	45	
10	Șoimii Lipova	34	13	6	15	54	80	−26	45	
11	Dorobanți	34	14	2	18	66	61	+5	44	
12	Voința Mailat	34	13	5	16	48	50	−2	44	
13	Progresul Pecica	34	13	5	16	54	59	−5	44	
14	Crișul Chișineu-Criș	34	13	4	17	48	67	−19	43	
15	Înfrățirea Iratoșu	34	11	8	15	42	61	−19	41	
16	Unirea Șeitin	34	11	5	18	59	78	−19	38	
17	Victoria Zăbrani (R)	34	10	4	20	38	61	−23	34	Relegation to Liga V Arad
18	Recolta Apateu (R)	34	6	3	25	48	128	−80	21	Relegation to Liga V Arad

Rules for classification: 1) Points; 2) Head-to-head points; 3) Head-to-head goal difference; 4) Head-to-head goals scored; 5) Head-to-head away goals scored; 6) Goal difference; 7) Goals scored.
(C) Champions; (Q) Qualified for the phase indicated; (R) Relegated

=== Argeș County ===
Pos	Team	Pld	W	D	L	GF	GA	GD	Pts	Qualification or relegation
1	Albota (C, Q)	38	34	1	3	115	26	+89	103	Qualification to promotion play-off
2	Rapid Pitești	38	29	5	4	130	39	+91	92	
3	Rucăr	38	26	2	10	109	60	+49	80	
4	Sporting Câmpulung	38	24	4	10	97	54	+43	76	
5	Internațional II Valea Iașului	38	21	6	11	99	55	+44	69	
6	DLR Pitești	38	21	5	12	99	62	+37	68	
7	Tablierul Alcadibo Pitești	38	21	4	13	88	60	+28	67	
8	Primavera Pitești	38	21	3	14	102	58	+44	66	
9	Bascov	38	20	6	12	80	63	+17	66	
10	Ciofrângeni	38	20	4	14	94	69	+25	64	
11	Veneția Bradu	38	16	5	17	78	82	−4	53	
12	Dacia Mioveni II	38	13	5	20	87	100	−13	44	
13	Concordia Boteni	38	12	6	20	80	99	−19	42	
14	Olimpia Suseni	38	13	2	23	55	95	−40	41	
15	Rafinorul Petrom Pitești	38	11	6	21	72	102	−30	39	
16	Bradu	38	10	4	24	73	111	−38	34	
17	Stâlpeni Rădești (R)	38	11	1	26	61	130	−69	34	Relegation to Liga V Argeș
18	Progresul Topoloveni (R)	38	10	2	26	55	115	−60	32	Relegation to Liga V Argeș
19	Rapid Davidești (R)	38	7	2	29	66	121	−55	23	Relegation to Liga V Argeș
20	Victoria Buzoești (R)	38	3	1	34	32	172	−140	10	Relegation to Liga V Argeș

Rules for classification: 1) Points; 2) Head-to-head points; 3) Head-to-head goal difference; 4) Head-to-head goals scored; 5) Head-to-head away goals scored; 6) Goal difference; 7) Goals scored.
(C) Champions; (Q) Qualified for the phase indicated; (R) Relegated

=== Bacău County ===
Pos	Team	Pld	W	D	L	GF	GA	GD	Pts	Qualification or relegation
1	Moinești (C, Q)	34	30	2	2	158	25	+133	92	Qualification to promotion play-off
2	Inter Onești	34	26	1	7	116	33	+83	79	
3	Înfrățirea Ghimeș	33	24	2	7	113	71	+42	74	
4	Aerostar Bacău II	34	19	5	10	81	50	+31	62	
5	Willy Bacău II	34	18	5	11	72	49	+23	59	
6	Mărgineni	33	19	2	12	85	64	+21	59	
7	Voința Podul Turcului	34	18	2	14	59	64	−5	56	
8	Sportul Răcăciuni	34	17	3	14	71	53	+18	54	
9	Royal Plopana	33	17	2	14	83	56	+27	53	
10	Măgura Târgu Ocna	34	15	0	19	46	65	−19	45	
11	Clipa VIO Bacău	33	13	4	16	70	83	−13	43	
12	Flamura Roșie Sascut	34	14	0	20	64	101	−37	42	
13	Siretul Prăjești	34	12	2	20	53	85	−32	38	
14	Nicolae Bălcescu (R)	34	10	3	21	34	69	−35	33 (Note: Nicolae Bălcescu and Petrom Dinamo Zemeș withdrew in the second part of the season and lost all remaining matches 0–3.)	Relegation to Liga V Bacău
15	Recolta Ardeoani	34	10	1	23	72	120	−48	31	
16	Hemeiuși	34	9	2	23	55	107	−52	29	
17	Negri	34	8	2	24	50	120	−70	26	
18	Petrom Dinamo Zemeș (R)	34	5	2	27	23	90	−67	17	Relegation to Liga V Bacău

Rules for classification: 1) Points; 2) Head-to-head points; 3) Head-to-head goal difference; 4) Head-to-head goals scored; 5) Head-to-head away goals scored; 6) Goal difference; 7) Goals scored.
(C) Champions; (Q) Qualified for the phase indicated; (R) Relegated

=== Bihor County ===
Pos	Team	Pld	W	D	L	GF	GA	GD	Pts	Qualification or relegation
1	Liberty II Marghita (C, Q)	28	22	2	4	90	24	+66	68	Qualification for promotion play-off
2	Luceafărul Lotus Băile Felix II	28	19	4	5	85	39	+46	61	
3	Crișul Aleșd	28	17	4	7	75	38	+37	55	
4	Stăruința Săcuieni	28	16	6	6	52	24	+28	54	
5	Izvorul Cociuba Mare	28	15	4	9	70	47	+23	49	
6	Vulturul Dobrești	28	12	6	10	61	45	+16	42	
7	Frontiera Oradea	28	12	4	12	65	53	+12	40	
8	Victoria Avram Iancu	28	12	3	13	55	57	−2	39	
9	Oțelul Ștei	28	10	4	14	36	49	−13	34	
10	Unirea Valea lui Mihai	28	8	9	11	55	72	−17	33	
11	Tricolorul Alparea	28	9	5	14	61	61	0	32	
12	Locadin Țețchea	28	9	2	17	46	59	−13	29	
13	Bihoreana Tileagd	28	8	5	15	55	73	−18	29	
14	Biharea Vașcău (R)	28	8	1	19	39	81	−42	25	Relegation to Liga V Bihor
15	Granitul Nucet (R)	28	2	3	23	26	137	−111	9	Relegation to Liga V Bihor

Rules for classification: Rules for classification: 1) Points 2) Head-to-head points; 3) Head-to-head goal difference; 4) Head-to-head goals scored; 5) Head-to-head away goals scored; 6) Goal difference; 7) Goals scored.
(C) Champions; (Q) Qualified for the phase indicated; (R) Relegated

=== Brăila County ===
Pos	Team	Pld	W	D	L	GF	GA	GD	Pts	Qualification or relegation
1	Steaua Brăila (C, Q)	24	17	4	3	72	30	+42	55	Qualification to promotion play-off
2	Victoria Traian	24	15	3	6	84	47	+37	48	
3	Făurei	24	14	2	8	70	49	+21	44	
4	Viitorul Galbenu	24	11	6	7	59	53	+6	39	
5	Petrolul Brăila	24	12	2	10	54	51	+3	38	
6	Victoria Dedulești	24	10	5	9	40	52	−12	35	
7	Victoria Cazasu	24	10	5	9	54	52	+2	35	
8	Avântul Chiscani	24	9	6	9	60	39	+21	33	
9	Viitorul Ianca	24	8	4	12	41	54	−13	28	
10	Tractorul Viziru	24	8	4	12	33	57	−24	28	
11	Avântul Cireșu	24	7	4	13	50	55	−5	25	
12	Voința Surdila-Găiseanca	24	6	4	14	39	57	−18	22	
13	Voința Vișani	24	3	3	18	30	90	−60	12	

Rules for classification: 1) Points; 2) Head-to-head points; 3) Head-to-head goal difference; 4) Head-to-head goals scored; 5) Head-to-head away goals scored; 6) Goal difference; 7) Goals scored.
(C) Champions; (Q) Qualified for the phase indicated

=== Bucharest ===
Final

Team 1	Score	Team 2
Progresul București II	1–1 (a.e.t.) (4–3 p)	Comprest GIM București

Progresul București II won the Liga IV Bucharest and qualify to promotion play-off in Liga III.

=== Caraș-Severin County ===
Pos	Team	Pld	W	D	L	GF	GA	GD	Pts	Qualification or relegation
1	Scorilo Caransebeș (C, Q)	28	24	2	2	79	12	+67	74	Qualification to promotion play-off
2	Gloria Reșița	28	23	2	3	88	19	+69	71	
3	Muncitorul Reșița	28	19	3	6	70	33	+37	60	
4	Moldo-Forest Moldova Nouă	28	17	4	7	58	25	+33	55	
5	Metalul Bocșa	28	14	7	7	58	37	+21	49	
6	Voința Lupac	28	13	6	9	67	53	+14	45	
7	Berzasca	28	9	9	10	33	37	−4	36	
8	Metalul Oțelu Roșu	28	10	6	12	53	38	+15	36	
9	Minerul Anina	28	9	9	10	38	40	−2	36	
10	Oravița	28	7	8	13	42	70	−28	29	
11	Bistra Glimboca	28	6	8	14	30	62	−32	26	
12	Hercules Băile Herculane	28	6	7	15	31	45	−14	25	
13	Minerul Dognecea	28	6	2	20	43	96	−53	20	
14	Nera Bozovici	28	5	5	18	22	53	−31	20	
15	Arsenal Reșița (R)	28	2	2	24	22	114	−92	8	Relegation to Liga V Caraș-Severin

Rules for classification: 1) Points; 2) Head-to-head points; 3) Head-to-head goal difference; 4) Head-to-head goals scored; 5) Head-to-head away goals scored; 6) Goal difference; 7) Goals scored.
(C) Champions; (Q) Qualified for the phase indicated; (R) Relegated

=== Cluj County ===
Pos	Team	Pld	W	D	L	GF	GA	GD	Pts	Qualification or relegation
1	CFR Cluj II (C, Q)	26	26	0	0	179	5	+174	78	Qualification to promotion play-off
2	Minerul Iara	26	23	0	3	151	21	+130	69	
3	Arieșul Turda II	26	19	1	6	83	35	+48	58	
4	Universitatea Cluj II	26	13	3	10	64	62	+2	42	
5	Leii Tritenii de Jos	26	12	5	9	53	58	−5	41	
6	Vlădeasa Huedin	26	12	5	9	62	49	+13	41	
7	Unirea Dej II	26	10	6	10	49	45	+4	36	
8	Industria Sârmei Câmpia Turzii II	26	10	3	13	48	57	−9	33	
9	Ivansuc Cluj-Napoca	26	8	5	13	47	60	−13	29	
10	Motorul IRA Cluj-Napoca	26	9	2	15	44	84	−40	29	
11	CFR Dej	26	7	1	18	34	81	−47	22	
12	Someșul Gilău	26	5	2	19	42	90	−48	17	
13	Someșul Apahida	26	4	4	18	42	93	−51	16	
14	Unirea Tritenii de Jos	26	4	1	21	34	192	−158	13	

Rules for classification: 1) Points; 2) Head-to-head points; 3) Head-to-head goal difference; 4) Head-to-head goals scored; 5) Head-to-head away goals scored; 6) Goal difference; 7) Goals scored.
(C) Champions; (Q) Qualified for the phase indicated

=== Covasna County ===
Pos	Team	Pld	W	D	L	GF	GA	GD	Pts	Qualification or relegation
1	Zagon (C, Q)	28	26	2	0	126	9	+117	80	Qualification to promotion play-off
2	Ojdula	28	19	3	6	95	37	+58	60	
3	Stăruința Bodoc	28	18	5	5	90	32	+58	59	
4	Perkő Sânzieni	28	14	6	8	55	42	+13	48	
5	Baraolt	28	14	5	9	66	38	+28	47	
6	Prima Brăduț	28	14	4	10	76	43	+33	46	
7	Nemere Ghelința	28	14	2	12	53	46	+7	44	
8	Viitorul Sfântu Gheorghe	28	11	4	13	55	57	−2	37	
9	Cernat	28	9	4	15	40	73	−33	31	
10	Catalina	28	8	4	16	34	57	−23	28	
11	Dozsa Dalnic	28	9	1	18	50	103	−53	28	
12	KSE Târgu Secuiesc	28	8	3	17	53	88	−35	27	
13	Progresul Sita Buzăului	28	7	3	18	51	98	−47	24	
14	Avântul Ilieni	28	7	2	19	33	92	−59	23	
15	Spartacus Hăghig (R)	28	6	4	18	54	116	−62	22	Relegation to Liga V Covasna
16	Micfalău (R)	0	0	0	0	0	0	0	0 (Note: Micfalău withdrew after 7 rounds and all its results were canceled.)	Withdrew

Rules for classification: 1) Points; 2) Head-to-head points; 3) Head-to-head goal difference; 4) Head-to-head goals scored; 5) Head-to-head away goals scored; 6) Goal difference; 7) Goals scored.
(C) Champions; (Q) Qualified for the phase indicated; (R) Relegated

=== Galați County ===
Pos	Team	Pld	W	D	L	GF	GA	GD	Pts	Qualification or relegation
1	Sporting Tecuci	24	21	2	1	79	21	+58	65	Qualification to promotion play-off
2	Dunărea Galați II	24	15	4	5	85	41	+44	49	
3	Unirea Hanu Conachi	24	15	1	8	57	30	+27	46	
4	Muncitorul Ghidigeni	24	13	4	7	57	39	+18	43	
5	Unirea Bolonia Tulucești	24	11	2	11	55	51	+4	35	
6	Imperfect Braniștea	24	10	4	10	54	49	+5	34	
7	Gloria Ivești	24	8	5	11	51	46	+5	29	
8	Frontiera Galați	24	8	4	12	26	37	−11	28	
9	Argintul Corod	24	8	4	12	32	56	−24	28	
10	Avântul Liești	24	7	6	11	34	52	−18	27	
11	Tineretul Negrilești	24	7	2	15	42	71	−29	23	
12	Unirea Cosmești	24	6	4	14	40	63	−23	22	
13	Avântul Vânatori	24	5	2	17	28	84	−56	17	
14	Politehnica Galați II (D)	0	0	0	0	0	0	0	0 (Note: Politehnica Galați II withdrew in the first part of the season and all its results were canceled.)	Withdrew

Rules for classification: 1) Points; 2) Head-to-head points; 3) Head-to-head goal difference; 4) Head-to-head goals scored; 5) Head-to-head away goals scored; 6) Goal difference; 7) Goals scored.
(D) Disqualified

=== Harghita County ===
East Series

Pos	Team	Pld	W	D	L	GF	GA	GD	Pts	Qualification or relegation
1	ASA Miercurea Ciuc Bălan (Q)	24	22	0	2	94	23	+71	66	Qualification to final
2	Străduința Mihăileni	24	14	4	6	62	39	+23	46	
3	Real Tulgheș	24	11	1	12	49	48	+1	34	
4	Paradise Lunca de Jos	24	8	5	11	54	71	−17	29	
5	Viitorul Gheorgheni	24	8	2	14	50	56	−6	26	
6	Ciceu	23	6	4	13	35	76	−41	22	
7	CSȘ Miercurea Ciuc	23	3	6	14	26	55	−29	15	

Rules for classification: 1) Points; 2) Head-to-head points; 3) Head-to-head goal difference; 4) Head-to-head goals scored; 5) Head-to-head away goals scored; 6) Goal difference; 7) Goals scored.
(Q) Qualified for the phase indicated

West Series

Pos	Team	Pld	W	D	L	GF	GA	GD	Pts	Qualification or relegation
1	Metalul Vlăhița (Q)	24	17	4	3	69	19	+50	55	Qualification to final
2	Praid	24	14	4	6	41	26	+15	46	
3	Forțeni	24	10	3	11	32	28	+4	33	
4	Roseal Odorheiu Secuiesc	24	12	4	8	60	29	+31	27 (Note: Roseal Odorheiu Secuiesc deducted 13 points.)	
5	Unirea Cristuru Secuiesc	24	5	6	13	23	52	−29	21	
6	Salon Mihăileni	23	4	7	12	27	58	−31	19	
7	Ocna de Jos	23	5	4	14	24	54	−30	19	

Rules for classification: 1) Points; 2) Head-to-head points; 3) Head-to-head goal difference; 4) Head-to-head goals scored; 5) Head-to-head away goals scored; 6) Goal difference; 7) Goals scored.
(Q) Qualified for the phase indicated
Notes:

Championship final

The matches was played on 18 and 25 May 2008.

Team 1	Agg.	Team 2	1st leg	2nd leg
Metalul Vlăhița	1–2	ASA Miercurea Ciuc Bălan	0–1	1–1 (a.e.t.)

ASA Miercurea Ciuc Bălan won the Liga IV Harghita County and qualify for promotion play-off in Liga III.

=== Mureș County ===
Pos	Team	Pld	W	D	L	GF	GA	GD	Pts	Qualification or relegation
1	Miercurea Nirajului (C, Q)	24	17	2	5	73	28	+45	53	Qualification to promotion play-off
2	Iernut	24	16	0	8	50	29	+21	48	
3	Gaz Metan Daneș	24	14	1	9	69	55	+14	43	
4	Mureșul Rușii-Munți	24	13	2	9	68	41	+27	41	
5	Viitorul 2002 Târnăveni	24	5	4	15	34	88	−54	19	
6	Mureșul Luduș	24	6	3	15	44	72	−28	18 (Note: Mureșul Luduș deducted three points.)	
7	Avântul Miheșu de Câmpie	24	5	2	17	38	69	−31	17	
8	Gliga Companies Reghin	0	0	0	0	0	0	0	0 (Note: Gliga Companies Reghin withdrew in the first part of the season and all its results were canceled.)	Withdrew

Rules for classification: 1) Points; 2) Head-to-head points; 3) Head-to-head goal difference; 4) Head-to-head goals scored; 5) Head-to-head away goals scored; 6) Goal difference; 7) Goals scored.
(C) Champions; (Q) Qualified for the phase indicated

=== Neamț County ===
Pos	Team	Pld	W	D	L	GF	GA	GD	Pts	Qualification or relegation
1	Voința Pângărați (C, Q)	26	22	1	3	95	33	+62	67	Qualification to promotion play-off
2	Cimentul Bicaz	26	19	2	5	94	31	+63	59	
3	Voința Ion Creangă	26	19	0	7	105	32	+73	57	
4	Victoria Horia	26	16	0	10	74	42	+32	48	
5	Bradul Roznov	26	13	6	7	79	45	+34	45	
6	Spicul Tămășeni	26	13	3	10	59	57	+2	42	
7	Biruința Gherăiești	26	12	5	9	62	44	+18	41	
8	Bravo Bodești	26	13	2	11	66	74	−8	41	
9	Viitorul Podoleni	26	12	2	12	77	63	+14	38	
10	Vulturul Zănești	26	12	1	13	61	59	+2	37	
11	Laminorul Roman II	26	8	2	16	52	74	−22	26	
12	LPS Piatra Neamț	26	5	2	19	38	114	−76	17	
13	Bradul Borca	26	5	0	21	41	143	−102	15	
14	Victoria Roman	26	0	0	26	10	102	−92	0 (Note: Victoria Roman withdrew at the end of the first part of the season and lost all the remaining matches with 0–3.)	

Rules for classification: 1) Points; 2) Head-to-head points; 3) Head-to-head goal difference; 4) Head-to-head goals scored; 5) Head-to-head away goals scored; 6) Goal difference; 7) Goals scored.
(C) Champions; (Q) Qualified for the phase indicated

=== Prahova County ===
Pos	Team	Pld	W	D	L	GF	GA	GD	Pts	Qualification or relegation
1	Voința Kaproni Gornet (C, Q)	34	30	2	2	121	22	+99	92	Qualification to promotion play-off
2	Petrolul Teleajen Ploiești	34	21	8	5	83	28	+55	71	
3	Avântul Măneciu	34	23	4	7	95	36	+59	69 (Note: Avântul Măneciu deducted 4 points.)	
4	Petrolul Ploiești III	34	21	5	8	80	37	+43	68	
5	Intersport Plopeni	34	20	5	9	75	36	+39	65	
6	Florești	34	19	4	11	63	48	+15	61	
7	Bănești-Urleta	34	16	5	13	55	51	+4	53	
8	Brazi	34	15	4	15	49	51	−2	49	
9	Caraimanul Euro-Africa Bușteni	34	13	6	15	51	56	−5	45	
10	Cheile Doftanei Brebu	34	13	3	18	47	55	−8	42	
11	Petrolul 95 Ploiești	34	11	6	17	47	64	−17	39	
12	Gloria Vâlcănești	34	12	3	19	51	79	−28	39	
13	Unirea Câmpina	34	11	4	19	46	74	−28	37	
14	Vălenii de Munte	34	9	7	18	36	59	−23	34	
15	Ceptura (Note: Ceptura was spared from relegation due to the promotion of Voința Kaproni Gornet to Liga III.)	34	10	3	21	55	99	−44	33	Spared from relegation
16	Unirea Călinești (R)	34	9	3	22	46	85	−39	30	Relegation to Liga V Prahova
17	Progresul Bucov (R)	34	9	3	22	40	82	−42	30	Relegation to Liga V Prahova
18	Coruna Cornu (R)	34	5	3	26	38	116	−78	18	Relegation to Liga V Prahova

Rules for classification: 1) Points; 2) Head-to-head points; 3) Head-to-head goal difference; 4) Head-to-head goals scored; 5) Head-to-head away goals scored; 6) Goal difference; 7) Goals scored.
(C) Champions; (Q) Qualified for the phase indicated; (R) Relegated

=== Sălaj County ===
Pos	Team	Pld	W	D	L	GF	GA	GD	Pts	Qualification or relegation
1	Zalău (C, Q)	30	30	0	0	229	11	+218	90	Qualification to promotion play-off
2	Dumbrava Gâlgău Almașului	30	22	2	6	82	41	+41	68	
3	Someșul Ileanda	30	20	4	6	102	46	+56	64	
4	Flacăra Halmășd	30	21	1	8	118	49	+69	64	
5	Rapid Jibou	30	15	4	11	91	76	+15	49	
6	Silvania Cehu Silvaniei	30	15	4	11	69	63	+6	49	
7	Gloria Bobota	30	15	2	13	78	79	−1	47	
8	Logistic Zalău	30	13	5	12	77	82	−5	44	
9	Barcău Nușfalău	30	14	1	15	64	70	−6	43	
10	Venus Măeriște	30	13	4	13	63	80	−17	42 (Note: Venus Măeriște deducted one point.)	
11	Rapid Zimbor	30	9	6	15	55	84	−29	33	
12	Juventus Crișeni	30	7	6	17	43	85	−42	27	
13	Favorit Crasna	30	7	4	19	41	93	−52	25	
14	Gloria Meseșeni	30	7	1	22	48	106	−58	22	
15	Grand Gym Jibou (R)	30	7	2	21	44	100	−56	20 (Note: Grand Gym Jibou deducted 3 points.)	Relegation to Liga V Sălaj
16	Someșul Gâlgău (R)	30	1	0	29	22	164	−142	3 (Note: Someșul Gâlgău withdrew in the second part of the season and lost all remaining matches with 0–3.)	Relegation to Liga V Sălaj

Rules for classification: 1) Points; 2) Head-to-head points; 3) Head-to-head goal difference; 4) Head-to-head goals scored; 5) Head-to-head away goals scored; 6) Goal difference; 7) Goals scored.
(C) Champions; (Q) Qualified for the phase indicated; (R) Relegated

=== Suceava County ===
Pos	Team	Pld	W	D	L	GF	GA	GD	Pts	Qualification or relegation
1	Rapid CFR Suceava (C, Q)	30	25	2	3	102	21	+81	77 (Note: Cetatea II Arbore used a suspended player throughout the match with Rapid CFR Suceava and the result of the match Cetatea II Arbore - Rapid CFR Suceava 1-0 on the field was approved with 0-3.)	Qualification to promotion play-off
2	Gura Humorului	30	25	1	4	107	26	+81	76	
3	Cetatea II Arbore	30	24	2	4	106	30	+76	74	
4	Dorna Vatra Dornei	30	17	2	11	86	52	+34	53	
5	Juventus Fălticeni II	30	15	4	11	56	41	+15	49	
6	Unirea Boroaia	30	13	4	13	67	61	+6	43	
7	Bucovina Bădeuți	30	13	2	15	44	61	−17	41	
8	Bradul Putna	30	12	4	14	50	49	+1	40	
9	Zimbrul Siret	30	12	1	17	59	69	−10	37	
10	Minerul Iacobeni	30	10	5	15	55	73	−18	35	
11	Bucovina Rădăuți	30	11	1	18	40	71	−31	34	
12	Foresta Moldovița	30	9	5	16	31	52	−21	32	
13	Avântul Todirești	30	10	2	18	46	90	−44	32	
14	Florconstruct Pătrăuți (R)	30	8	6	16	55	61	−6	30	Relegation to Liga V Suceava
15	Viitorul Liteni (R)	30	8	2	20	41	92	−51	26	Relegation to Liga V Suceava
16	Flacăra Roșie Udești (R)	30	6	0	24	28	117	−89	18	Relegation to Liga V Suceava

Rules for classification: 1) Points; 2) Head-to-head points; 3) Head-to-head goal difference; 4) Head-to-head goals scored; 5) Head-to-head away goals scored; 6) Goal difference; 7) Goals scored.
(C) Champions; (Q) Qualified for the phase indicated; (R) Relegated

=== Timiș County ===
Pos	Team	Pld	W	D	L	GF	GA	GD	Pts	Qualification or relegation
1	Progresul Gătaia (C, Q)	30	25	1	4	87	26	+61	76	Qualification to promotion play-off
2	Millenium Giarmata	30	19	6	5	66	26	+40	63	
3	Recaș	30	18	5	7	69	25	+44	59	
4	Top Alumino Timișoara	30	18	5	7	63	38	+25	59	
5	Peciu Nou	30	14	4	12	59	48	+11	46	
6	Textila Timișoara	30	14	3	13	64	39	+25	45	
7	Auto Timișoara	30	14	2	14	57	48	+9	44	
8	Marcel Băban Jimbolia	30	11	8	11	44	45	−1	41	
9	Pobeda Dudeștii Vechi	30	12	5	13	43	57	−14	41	
10	Timișul Șag	30	12	4	14	46	64	−18	40	
11	Bega Belinț	30	11	5	14	43	62	−19	38	
12	Politehnica 2002 Timișoara	30	11	4	15	35	53	−18	37	
13	Coșteiu	30	11	2	17	58	73	−15	35	
14	BC Golf Timișoara (R)	30	8	6	16	35	65	−30	30	Relegation to Liga V Timiș
15	Plavii Delia Sânpetru Mare (R)	30	7	1	22	35	80	−45	22	Relegation to Liga V Timiș
16	Electrica Timișoara (R)	30	3	3	24	21	76	−55	12	Relegation to Liga V Timiș

Rules for classification: 1) Points; 2) Head-to-head points; 3) Head-to-head goal difference; 4) Head-to-head goals scored; 5) Head-to-head away goals scored; 6) Goal difference; 7) Goals scored.
(C) Champions; (Q) Qualified for the phase indicated; (R) Relegated

=== Vâlcea County ===
Pos	Team	Pld	W	D	L	GF	GA	GD	Pts	Qualification or relegation
1	Hidroelectra Râmnicu Vâlcea (C, Q)	34	31	2	1	127	21	+106	95	Qualification to promotion play-off
2	Dinamo Horezu	34	30	3	1	109	22	+87	93	
3	Drăgășani	34	22	4	8	103	46	+57	70	
4	Dinamo Râmnicu Vâlcea	34	21	6	7	107	33	+74	69	
5	Minerul Berbești	34	22	2	10	78	33	+45	68	
6	Energia Malaia	34	21	3	10	87	37	+50	66	
7	Râmnicu Vâlcea II	34	19	3	12	88	57	+31	60	
8	Șirineasa	34	14	7	13	80	66	+14	49	
9	Sportul Râmnicu Vâlcea	34	12	3	19	74	101	−27	39	
10	Vartex Râmnicu Vâlcea	34	12	5	17	63	79	−16	41	
11	Alma Lex Drăgășani	34	12	2	20	80	89	−9	38	
12	Oltețul Zătreni	34	10	6	18	56	71	−15	36	
13	Topologul Nicolae Bălcescu	34	10	3	21	54	94	−40	33	
14	Flacăra Horezu	34	11	3	20	57	80	−23	33 (Note: Flacăra Horezu deducted 3 points.)	
15	Viitorul Râmnicu Vâlcea (R)	34	9	5	20	43	86	−43	32	Relegation to Liga V Vâlcea
16	Luncavățul Popești (R)	34	7	3	24	44	100	−56	24	Relegation to Liga V Vâlcea
17	Govora (R)	34	7	2	25	42	166	−124	23	Relegation to Liga V Vâlcea
18	Forestierul Băbeni (R)	34	4	2	28	25	134	−109	14	Relegation to Liga V Vâlcea

Rules for classification: 1) Points; 2) Head-to-head points; 3) Head-to-head goal difference; 4) Head-to-head goals scored; 5) Head-to-head away goals scored; 6) Goal difference; 7) Goals scored.
(C) Champions; (Q) Qualified for the phase indicated; (R) Relegated

=== Vrancea County ===
Group A

Pos	Team	Pld	W	D	L	GF	GA	GD	Pts	Qualification or relegation
1	Energia Vulturu (Q)	26	23	1	2	115	19	+96	70	Qualification to championship final
2	Voința Cârligele	26	21	1	4	89	24	+65	64	
3	Vulturul SLD Focșani	26	19	1	6	76	32	+44	58	
4	Dumitrești	26	19	1	6	83	49	+34	58	
5	Steaua Focșani	26	16	2	8	95	48	+47	50	
6	Unirea Milcovul	26	13	2	11	55	52	+3	41	
7	Zorile Cotești	26	12	1	13	72	70	+2	37	
8	Dinamo Tătăranu	26	11	4	11	57	59	−2	37	
9	Flacăra Urechești	26	10	2	14	45	57	−12	32	
10	Victoria Gologanu	26	6	5	15	33	65	−32	23	
11	Unirea Focșani	26	7	1	18	43	92	−49	22	
12	Național Golești	26	5	1	20	37	80	−43	16	
13	Voința Slobozia Ciorăști	26	4	3	19	24	104	−80	15	
14	Victoria Bordeasca	26	3	2	21	29	102	−73	11	

Rules for classification: 1) Points; 2) Head-to-head points; 3) Head-to-head goal difference; 4) Head-to-head goals scored; 5) Head-to-head away goals scored; 6) Goal difference; 7) Goals scored.
(Q) Qualified for the phase indicated

Group B

Pos	Team	Pld	W	D	L	GF	GA	GD	Pts	Qualification or relegation
1	Panciu (Q)	24	23	1	0	140	8	+132	70	Qualification to championship final
2	Unirea Bolotești	24	16	2	6	82	54	+28	50	
3	Viitorul Homocea	24	14	5	5	70	32	+38	47	
4	Voința Deep Serv Odobești	24	15	1	8	52	39	+13	46	
5	Chimica Mărășești	24	12	3	9	57	56	+1	39	
6	Adjud	24	11	3	10	51	60	−9	36	
7	Unirea Țifești	24	11	1	12	72	57	+15	34	
8	Siretul Suraia	24	9	6	9	60	58	+2	33	
9	Avântul Jariștea	24	9	3	12	49	68	−19	30	
10	Viticultorul Vârteșcoiu	24	8	1	15	42	76	−34	25	
11	Unirea Pufești	24	7	3	14	28	69	−41	24	
12	Rromstar Panciu	24	6	1	17	35	61	−26	19	
13	Trotusul Ruginești	24	2	0	22	23	117	−94	6	

Rules for classification: 1) Points; 2) Head-to-head points; 3) Head-to-head goal difference; 4) Head-to-head goals scored; 5) Head-to-head away goals scored; 6) Goal difference; 7) Goals scored.
(Q) Qualified for the phase indicated

Championship final

Team 1	Score	Team 2
Energia Vulturu	0–4	Panciu

Panciu won the Liga IV Vrancea County and qualify to promotion play-off in Liga III.

== See also ==
- 2007–08 Liga I
- 2007–08 Liga II
- 2007–08 Liga III
- 2007–08 Cupa României
