= 2006–07 Liga IV =

65th season of the Liga IV, the fourth tier of the Romanian football league

Liga IV
- Season: 2006–07

The 2006–07 Liga IV was the 65th season of the Liga IV, the fourth tier of the Romanian football league system. The champions of each county association play against one from a neighboring county in a play-off match played on a neutral venue. The winners of the play-off matches promoted to Divizia C.

== County leagues ==
- Alba (AB)
- Arad (AR)
- Argeș (AG)
- Bacău (BC)
- Bihor (BH)
- Bistrița-Năsăud (BN)
- Botoșani (BT)
- Brașov (BV)
- Brăila (BR)
- Bucharest (B)
- Buzău (BZ)
- Caraș-Severin (CS)
- Călărași (CL)
- Cluj (CJ)
- Constanța (CT)
- Covasna (CV)
- Dâmbovița (DB)
- Dolj (DJ)
- Galați (GL)
- Giurgiu (GR)
- Gorj (GJ)
- Harghita (HR)
- Hunedoara (HD)
- Ialomița (IL)
- Iași (IS)
- Ilfov (IF)
- Maramureș (MM)
- Mehedinți (MH)
- Mureș (MS)
- Neamț (NT)
- Olt (OT)
- Prahova (PH)
- Satu Mare (SM)
- Sălaj (SJ)
- Sibiu (SB)
- Suceava (SV)
- Teleorman (TR)
- Timiș (TM)
- Tulcea (TL)
- Vaslui (VS)
- Vâlcea (VL)
- Vrancea (VN)

== Promotion play-off ==
The matches was scheduled to be played on 16 June 2007.

| Team 1 | Score | Team 2 |
|---|---|---|
| Medgidia (CT) | 2–0 | (CL) Rapid Gălățui |
| Granitul Babadag (TL) | 2–5 | (IL) Abatorul Slobozia |
| Ianca (BR) | 6–2 | (BC) Mărgineni |
| Bujorii Târgu Bujor (GL) | 2–1 (a.e.t.) | (IS) Iris Iași |
| Energia Vulturu (VN) | 0–2 | (NT) Cetatea Târgu Neamț |
| Bârlad (VS) | 2–0 | (BT) Avântul Albești |
| Onix Râmnicu Sărat (BZ) | 3–0 (Note: The FRF Discipline Commission decided that the result of the match Onix Râmnicu Sărat - Mikes Zagon 1–2 would be approved with 3–0. The team from Zagon used one player without the right to play.) | (CV) Zagon |
| Viitorul Gheorgheni (HR) | 0–1 (a.e.t.) | (MS) Gaz Metan Târgu Mureș |
| Rarăul Câmpulung Moldovenesc (SV) | 1–0 | (BN) Voința Cetate |
| Minerul Iara-Băișoara (CJ) | 2–2 (4–5 p) | (MM) Marmaţia Sighetu Marmaţiei |
| Turul Micula (SM) | 1–0 | (AR) CNM Pâncota |
| Zalău (SJ) | 2–3 | (BH) Bihor II Tileagd |
| Cisnădie (SB) | 1–1 (5–6 p) | (AB) Kozara Vințu de Jos |
| Nuova Mama Mia Becicherecu Mic (TM) | 5–2 | (MH) Pandurii Cerneți |
| Gloria Reșița (CS) | 0–1 | (DJ) CFR Craiova |
| CFR Marmosim Simeria (HD) | 3–2 | (GJ) Parângul Sadu |
| Sportul Râmnicu Vâlcea (VL) | 0–2 | (TR) Turris Turnu Măgurele |
| Comprest GIM București (B) | 0–1 | (DB) FCM Târgoviște II |
| Juventus Bascov (AG) | 3–0 | (OT) Oltul 2000 Drăgănești-Olt |
| Unirea Tărlungeni (BV) | 2–1 (a.e.t.) | (IF) Viscofil Popești Leordeni |
| Nova Force Giurgiu (GR) | 1–5 | (PH) Filipeștii de Pădure |

== Leagues standings ==
=== Arad County ===
| Pos | Team | Pld | W | D | L | GF | GA | GD | Pts | Qualification or relegation |
|---|---|---|---|---|---|---|---|---|---|---|
| 1 | CNM Pâncota (C, Q) | 38 | 33 | 2 | 3 | 151 | 20 | +131 | 101 | Qualification for promotion play-off |
| 2 | Regal Horia | 38 | 25 | 5 | 8 | 106 | 46 | +60 | 80 | |
| 3 | Voința Macea II | 38 | 24 | 3 | 11 | 102 | 58 | +44 | 75 | |
| 4 | Voința Mailat | 38 | 22 | 6 | 10 | 77 | 39 | +38 | 72 | |
| 5 | Național Sebiș | 38 | 22 | 3 | 13 | 86 | 50 | +36 | 69 | |
| 6 | Păulișana Păuliș | 38 | 20 | 4 | 14 | 72 | 77 | −5 | 64 | |
| 7 | Partizan Satu Mare | 38 | 18 | 7 | 13 | 98 | 82 | +16 | 61 | |
| 8 | Unirea Sântana | 38 | 18 | 6 | 14 | 90 | 66 | +24 | 60 | |
| 9 | Dorobanți | 38 | 16 | 9 | 13 | 55 | 61 | −6 | 57 | |
| 10 | Vladimirescu | 38 | 16 | 7 | 15 | 70 | 65 | +5 | 55 | |
| 11 | Frontiera Curtici | 38 | 16 | 6 | 16 | 63 | 69 | −6 | 54 | |
| 12 | Victoria Zăbrani | 38 | 14 | 8 | 16 | 52 | 58 | −6 | 50 | |
| 13 | Crișul Chișineu-Criș | 38 | 15 | 4 | 19 | 62 | 68 | −6 | 49 | |
| 14 | Aqua Vest Arad | 38 | 14 | 6 | 18 | 75 | 83 | −8 | 48 | |
| 15 | Înfrățirea Iratoșu | 38 | 12 | 9 | 17 | 52 | 65 | −13 | 45 | |
| 16 | Dacia Beliu (R) | 38 | 12 | 3 | 23 | 66 | 102 | −36 | 39 | Relegation to Liga V Arad |
| 17 | Unirea Șeitin (R) | 38 | 10 | 4 | 24 | 56 | 117 | −61 | 34 | Relegation to Liga V Arad |
| 18 | Victoria Lunca Teuz Sânpaul (R) | 38 | 8 | 5 | 25 | 47 | 102 | −55 | 29 | Relegation to Liga V Arad |
| 19 | Șoimii Lipova (R) | 38 | 7 | 5 | 26 | 47 | 116 | −69 | 26 | Relegation to Liga V Arad |
| 20 | Atletico Arad (R) | 38 | 5 | 4 | 29 | 37 | 109 | −72 | 19 | Relegation to Liga V Arad |

Rules for classification: Rules for classification: 1) Points 2) Head-to-head points; 3) Head-to-head goal difference; 4) Head-to-head goals scored; 5) Head-to-head away goals scored; 6) Goal difference; 7) Goals scored.
(C) Champions; (Q) Qualified for the phase indicated; (R) Relegated

=== Bihor County ===
| Pos | Team | Pld | W | D | L | GF | GA | GD | Pts | Qualification or relegation |
|---|---|---|---|---|---|---|---|---|---|---|
| 1 | Bihor II Tileagd (C, Q) | 30 | 21 | 5 | 4 | 74 | 36 | +38 | 68 | Qualification for promotion play-off |
| 2 | Crișul Aleșd | 30 | 20 | 7 | 3 | 86 | 29 | +57 | 67 | |
| 3 | Luceafărul Lotus Băile Felix II | 29 | 19 | 4 | 6 | 72 | 27 | +45 | 61 | |
| 4 | Minerul Ștei | 30 | 17 | 7 | 6 | 87 | 41 | +46 | 58 | |
| 5 | Frontiera Oradea | 30 | 17 | 5 | 8 | 56 | 39 | +17 | 56 | |
| 6 | Locadin Țețchea | 29 | 14 | 6 | 9 | 56 | 52 | +4 | 48 | |
| 7 | Vulturul Dobrești | 30 | 15 | 2 | 13 | 57 | 49 | +8 | 47 | |
| 8 | Bihoreana Marghita | 30 | 11 | 12 | 7 | 57 | 33 | +24 | 45 | |
| 9 | Victoria Avram Iancu | 30 | 13 | 6 | 11 | 69 | 60 | +9 | 45 | |
| 10 | Izvorul Cociuba Mare | 30 | 10 | 5 | 15 | 57 | 59 | −2 | 35 | |
| 11 | Stăruința Săcuieni | 30 | 8 | 5 | 17 | 50 | 75 | −25 | 29 | |
| 12 | Oțelul Ștei | 30 | 8 | 4 | 18 | 33 | 63 | −30 | 28 | |
| 13 | Biharea Vașcău | 30 | 7 | 5 | 18 | 35 | 80 | −45 | 26 | |
| 14 | Tricolorul Alparea | 30 | 6 | 3 | 21 | 59 | 88 | −29 | 21 | |
| 15 | Crișana Tinca (R) | 30 | 5 | 6 | 19 | 43 | 94 | −51 | 21 | Relegation to Liga V Bihor |
| 16 | Romtrans-Granitul Nucet (R) | 30 | 6 | 2 | 22 | 38 | 101 | −63 | 20 | Relegation to Liga V Bihor |

Rules for classification: Rules for classification: 1) Points 2) Head-to-head points; 3) Head-to-head goal difference; 4) Head-to-head goals scored; 5) Head-to-head away goals scored; 6) Goal difference; 7) Goals scored.
(C) Champions; (Q) Qualified for the phase indicated; (R) Relegated

=== Brăila County ===
| Pos | Team | Pld | W | D | L | GF | GA | GD | Pts | Qualification or relegation |
|---|---|---|---|---|---|---|---|---|---|---|
| 1 | CSO Ianca (C, Q) | 24 | 19 | 1 | 4 | 78 | 20 | +58 | 58 | Qualification to promotion play-off |
| 2 | Victoria Traian | 24 | 18 | 4 | 2 | 66 | 23 | +43 | 58 | |
| 3 | Eldomir Viziru | 24 | 15 | 3 | 6 | 70 | 13 | +57 | 48 | |
| 4 | Viitorul Ianca | 24 | 14 | 3 | 7 | 52 | 25 | +27 | 45 | |
| 5 | Făurei | 24 | 11 | 7 | 6 | 64 | 36 | +28 | 40 | |
| 6 | Urleasca | 24 | 12 | 4 | 8 | 41 | 35 | +6 | 40 | |
| 7 | Avântul Cireșu | 24 | 10 | 3 | 11 | 56 | 45 | +11 | 33 | |
| 8 | Victoria Cazasu | 24 | 6 | 8 | 10 | 31 | 43 | −12 | 26 | |
| 9 | Adevărat Chiscani | 24 | 7 | 5 | 12 | 37 | 54 | −17 | 26 | |
| 10 | Voința Surdila-Găiseanca | 24 | 7 | 4 | 13 | 16 | 60 | −44 | 25 | |
| 11 | Victoria Dedulești | 24 | 7 | 3 | 14 | 30 | 54 | −24 | 24 | |
| 12 | Voința Vișani | 24 | 5 | 3 | 16 | 37 | 68 | −31 | 18 | |
| 13 | Comagrim Dudești | 24 | 0 | 2 | 22 | 18 | 122 | −104 | 2 | |

Rules for classification: 1) Points; 2) Head-to-head points; 3) Head-to-head goal difference; 4) Head-to-head goals scored; 5) Head-to-head away goals scored; 6) Goal difference; 7) Goals scored.
(C) Champions; (Q) Qualified for the phase indicated

=== Caraș-Severin County ===
| Pos | Team | Pld | W | D | L | GF | GA | GD | Pts | Qualification or relegation |
|---|---|---|---|---|---|---|---|---|---|---|
| 1 | Gloria Reșița (C, Q) | 30 | 23 | 5 | 2 | 84 | 19 | +65 | 74 | Qualification to promotion play-off |
| 2 | Muncitorul Reșița | 30 | 23 | 1 | 6 | 78 | 32 | +46 | 70 | |
| 3 | Scorilo Caransebeș | 30 | 20 | 4 | 6 | 74 | 23 | +51 | 64 | |
| 4 | Minerul Moldova Nouă | 30 | 16 | 9 | 5 | 41 | 20 | +21 | 57 | |
| 5 | Nera Bozovici | 30 | 17 | 1 | 12 | 51 | 39 | +12 | 52 | |
| 6 | Metalul Oțelu Roșu | 30 | 15 | 6 | 9 | 71 | 42 | +29 | 51 | |
| 7 | Metalul Bocșa | 30 | 16 | 2 | 12 | 65 | 51 | +14 | 50 | |
| 8 | Berzasca | 30 | 14 | 3 | 13 | 51 | 47 | +4 | 45 | |
| 9 | Minerul Anina | 30 | 14 | 3 | 13 | 42 | 54 | −12 | 45 | |
| 10 | Arsenal Reșița | 30 | 10 | 4 | 16 | 37 | 47 | −10 | 34 | |
| 11 | Oravița | 30 | 8 | 8 | 14 | 45 | 53 | −8 | 32 | |
| 12 | Bistra Glimboca | 30 | 9 | 4 | 17 | 36 | 61 | −25 | 31 | |
| 13 | Voința Lupac | 30 | 9 | 1 | 20 | 45 | 85 | −40 | 28 | |
| 14 | Hercules Băile Herculane | 30 | 6 | 3 | 21 | 34 | 81 | −47 | 21 | |
| 15 | Dunărea Moldova Nouă (R) | 30 | 5 | 4 | 21 | 32 | 79 | −47 | 19 | Relegation to Liga V Caraș-Severin |
| 16 | Ibrilont Ohaba-Mâtnic (R) | 30 | 4 | 4 | 22 | 40 | 93 | −53 | 16 | Relegation to Liga V Caraș-Severin |

Rules for classification: 1) Points; 2) Head-to-head points; 3) Head-to-head goal difference; 4) Head-to-head goals scored; 5) Head-to-head away goals scored; 6) Goal difference; 7) Goals scored.
(C) Champions; (Q) Qualified for the phase indicated; (R) Relegated

=== Covasna County ===
| Pos | Team | Pld | W | D | L | GF | GA | GD | Pts | Qualification or relegation |
|---|---|---|---|---|---|---|---|---|---|---|
| 1 | Zagon (C, Q) | 30 | 29 | 0 | 1 | 152 | 23 | +129 | 87 | Qualification to promotion play-off |
| 2 | Stăruința Bodoc | 30 | 20 | 6 | 4 | 106 | 41 | +65 | 66 | |
| 3 | Prima Brăduț | 30 | 18 | 3 | 9 | 81 | 39 | +42 | 57 | |
| 4 | Baraolt | 30 | 17 | 3 | 10 | 92 | 44 | +48 | 54 | |
| 5 | Nemere Ghelința | 30 | 15 | 4 | 11 | 85 | 46 | +39 | 49 | |
| 6 | Ojdula | 30 | 14 | 6 | 10 | 67 | 51 | +16 | 48 | |
| 7 | Cernat | 30 | 13 | 3 | 14 | 50 | 51 | −1 | 42 | |
| 8 | Avântul Ilieni | 30 | 12 | 3 | 15 | 67 | 64 | +3 | 39 | |
| 9 | Spartacus Hăghig | 30 | 11 | 6 | 13 | 61 | 101 | −40 | 39 | |
| 10 | Perkő Sânzieni | 30 | 11 | 5 | 14 | 51 | 48 | +3 | 38 | |
| 11 | KSE Târgu Secuiesc II | 30 | 11 | 2 | 17 | 53 | 62 | −9 | 35 | |
| 12 | Catalina | 30 | 10 | 1 | 19 | 49 | 75 | −26 | 31 | |
| 13 | Micfalău | 30 | 11 | 2 | 17 | 47 | 108 | −61 | 30 (Note: Micfalău deducted 5 points.) | |
| 14 | Progresul Sita Buzăului | 30 | 8 | 4 | 18 | 56 | 97 | −41 | 28 | |
| 15 | Zăbala (R) | 30 | 7 | 4 | 19 | 41 | 143 | −102 | 24 (Note: Zăbala deducted 1 point.) | Relegation to Liga V Covasna |
| 16 | Venus Ozun (R) | 30 | 4 | 6 | 20 | 38 | 103 | −65 | 18 | Relegation to Liga V Covasna |

Rules for classification: 1) Points; 2) Head-to-head points; 3) Head-to-head goal difference; 4) Head-to-head goals scored; 5) Head-to-head away goals scored; 6) Goal difference; 7) Goals scored.
(C) Champions; (Q) Qualified for the phase indicated; (R) Relegated

=== Galați County ===
| Pos | Team | Pld | W | D | L | GF | GA | GD | Pts | Qualification or relegation |
|---|---|---|---|---|---|---|---|---|---|---|
| 1 | Bujorii Târgu Bujor (C, Q) | 28 | 22 | 4 | 2 | 127 | 31 | +96 | 70 | Qualification to promotion play-off |
| 2 | Imperfect Braniștea | 28 | 22 | 3 | 3 | 82 | 19 | +63 | 69 | |
| 3 | Sporting Tecuci | 28 | 20 | 0 | 8 | 126 | 32 | +94 | 60 | |
| 4 | Dunărea Galați II | 28 | 19 | 2 | 7 | 75 | 37 | +38 | 59 | |
| 5 | Unirea Hanu Conachi | 28 | 16 | 4 | 8 | 91 | 49 | +42 | 52 | |
| 6 | Muncitorul Ghidigeni | 28 | 14 | 2 | 12 | 62 | 54 | +8 | 44 | |
| 7 | Gloria Ivești | 28 | 14 | 0 | 14 | 59 | 63 | −4 | 42 | |
| 8 | Agronomia Tulucești | 28 | 13 | 2 | 13 | 69 | 75 | −6 | 41 | |
| 9 | Metalul Toflea (Note: Metalul Toflea, Sporting Voința Liești and Avântul Valea Mărului withdrew in the second part and lost all remaining matches with 0–3.) | 28 | 10 | 3 | 15 | 46 | 66 | −20 | 33 | |
| 10 | Unirea Bolonia Tulucești | 28 | 9 | 5 | 14 | 59 | 65 | −6 | 32 | |
| 11 | Mălina Smârdan | 28 | 9 | 2 | 17 | 50 | 76 | −26 | 29 | |
| 12 | Avântul Vânatori | 28 | 8 | 2 | 18 | 43 | 114 | −71 | 26 | |
| 13 | Sporting Voința Liești | 28 | 7 | 4 | 17 | 39 | 58 | −19 | 25 | |
| 14 | Olimpia Drăgușeni | 28 | 7 | 1 | 20 | 51 | 128 | −77 | 22 | |
| 15 | Avântul Valea Mărului | 28 | 0 | 0 | 28 | 16 | 128 | −112 | 0 | |

Rules for classification: 1) Points; 2) Head-to-head points; 3) Head-to-head goal difference; 4) Head-to-head goals scored; 5) Head-to-head away goals scored; 6) Goal difference; 7) Goals scored.
(C) Champions; (Q) Qualified for the phase indicated

=== Maramureș County ===
North Series

| Pos | Team | Pld | W | D | L | GF | GA | GD | Pts | Qualification or relegation (Note: After 18 matches, the best four teams qualify for series play-off.) |
|---|---|---|---|---|---|---|---|---|---|---|
| 1 | Marmația Sighetu Marmației (Q) | 27 | 26 | 1 | 0 | 154 | 21 | +133 | 79 | Qualification to championship final |
| 2 | Bradul Vișeu de Sus | 27 | 17 | 4 | 6 | 103 | 61 | +42 | 55 | |
| 3 | Tisa Sighetu Marmației | 27 | 13 | 3 | 11 | 67 | 63 | +4 | 42 | |
| 4 | Iza Dragomirești | 27 | 8 | 5 | 14 | 66 | 90 | −24 | 29 | |
| 5 | Minerul Borșa | 18 | 9 | 1 | 8 | 44 | 46 | −2 | 28 | |
| 6 | Zorile Moisei | 18 | 8 | 3 | 7 | 43 | 43 | 0 | 27 | |
| 7 | Brișca Sarasău | 18 | 7 | 1 | 10 | 39 | 59 | −20 | 22 | |
| 8 | Foresta Câmpulung la Tisa | 18 | 2 | 5 | 11 | 25 | 52 | −27 | 11 | |
| 9 | Rozalina Rozavlea | 18 | 2 | 4 | 12 | 26 | 72 | −46 | 10 | |
| 10 | Kosziszbur Ocna Șugatag | 18 | 2 | 1 | 15 | 19 | 79 | −60 | 7 | |

(Q) Qualified for the phase indicated
Notes:

South Series

| Pos | Team | Pld | W | D | L | GF | GA | GD | Pts | Qualification or relegation |
|---|---|---|---|---|---|---|---|---|---|---|
| 1 | Someșul Ulmeni (Q) | 24 | 19 | 3 | 2 | 99 | 24 | +75 | 60 | Qualification to championship final |
| 2 | Spicul Ardusat | 24 | 18 | 4 | 2 | 102 | 23 | +79 | 58 | |
| 3 | Minerul Băița | 24 | 16 | 0 | 8 | 55 | 43 | +12 | 48 | |
| 4 | U Nord Baia Mare | 24 | 13 | 3 | 8 | 63 | 39 | +24 | 42 | |
| 5 | Plastunion Satulung | 24 | 11 | 2 | 11 | 58 | 43 | +15 | 35 | |
| 6 | Lăpușul Târgu Lăpuș | 24 | 10 | 5 | 9 | 34 | 30 | +4 | 35 | |
| 7 | Gloria Renel Baia Mare | 24 | 10 | 4 | 10 | 56 | 49 | +7 | 34 | |
| 8 | Moeller Fărcașa | 24 | 10 | 4 | 10 | 33 | 31 | +2 | 34 | |
| 9 | Independența Baia Mare | 24 | 8 | 5 | 11 | 34 | 47 | −13 | 29 | |
| 10 | Progresul Șomcuta Mare | 24 | 7 | 1 | 16 | 41 | 68 | −27 | 22 | |
| 11 | Asten Tăuții-Măgherăuș | 24 | 5 | 3 | 16 | 42 | 95 | −53 | 18 | |
| 12 | Unirea Șișești | 24 | 5 | 3 | 16 | 37 | 90 | −53 | 18 | |
| 13 | Minerul Cavnic | 24 | 5 | 1 | 18 | 25 | 97 | −72 | 16 | |

(Q) Qualified for the phase indicated

Championship final

The championship final was played on 7 June 2007 at Dealul Florilor Stadium in Baia Mare.

| Team 1 | Score | Team 2 |
|---|---|---|
| Someșul Ulmeni | 0–2 | Marmația Sighetu Marmației |

Marmația Sighetu Marmației won the Liga IV Maramureș County and qualify to promotion play-off in Liga III.

=== Mehedinți County ===
| Pos | Team | Pld | W | D | L | GF | GA | GD | Pts | Qualification or relegation |
|---|---|---|---|---|---|---|---|---|---|---|
| 1 | Pandurii Cerneți (C, Q) | 30 | 24 | 4 | 2 | 90 | 18 | +72 | 76 | Qualification to promotion play-off |
| 2 | Victoria Devesel | 30 | 25 | 0 | 5 | 113 | 39 | +74 | 75 | |
| 3 | Dunărea Orșova | 30 | 22 | 5 | 3 | 92 | 17 | +75 | 71 | |
| 4 | Diesel Drobeta-Turnu-Severin | 30 | 22 | 2 | 6 | 86 | 21 | +65 | 68 | |
| 5 | Severnav Drobeta-Turnu-Severin II | 30 | 14 | 3 | 13 | 73 | 58 | +15 | 45 | |
| 6 | Recolta Dănceu | 30 | 13 | 5 | 12 | 82 | 63 | +19 | 44 | |
| 7 | Dunărea Hinova | 30 | 11 | 10 | 9 | 53 | 63 | −10 | 43 | |
| 8 | Agromec Șimian | 30 | 18 | 3 | 9 | 57 | 34 | +23 | 39 (Note: Agromec Șimian deducted 18 points.) | |
| 9 | Strehaia | 30 | 10 | 6 | 14 | 55 | 47 | +8 | 36 | |
| 10 | Constructorul Eșelnița | 30 | 11 | 3 | 16 | 34 | 65 | −31 | 36 | |
| 11 | Viitorul Cujmir | 30 | 10 | 4 | 16 | 53 | 55 | −2 | 34 | |
| 12 | Marmura Breznița-Ocol | 30 | 10 | 1 | 19 | 37 | 73 | −36 | 31 | |
| 13 | Termo Drobeta-Turnu-Severin | 30 | 9 | 3 | 18 | 35 | 58 | −23 | 30 | |
| 14 | Cerna Baia de Aramă | 30 | 8 | 2 | 20 | 39 | 124 | −85 | 26 | |
| 15 | Șovarna | 30 | 3 | 2 | 25 | 27 | 92 | −65 | 11 | |
| 16 | Unirea Livezile | 30 | 0 | 1 | 29 | 18 | 118 | −100 | 1 | |

Rules for classification: 1) Points; 2) Head-to-head points; 3) Head-to-head goal difference; 4) Head-to-head goals scored; 5) Head-to-head away goals scored; 6) Goal difference; 7) Goals scored.
(C) Champions; (Q) Qualified for the phase indicated

=== Mureș County ===
| Pos | Team | Pld | W | D | L | GF | GA | GD | Pts | Qualification or relegation |
|---|---|---|---|---|---|---|---|---|---|---|
| 1 | Gaz Metan Târgu Mureș (C, Q) | 22 | 22 | 0 | 0 | 163 | 13 | +150 | 66 | Qualification to promotion play-off |
| 2 | Miercurea Nirajului | 22 | 16 | 1 | 5 | 62 | 26 | +36 | 49 | |
| 3 | Mureșul Rușii-Munți | 22 | 15 | 1 | 6 | 70 | 38 | +32 | 46 | |
| 4 | Iernut | 22 | 13 | 3 | 6 | 67 | 46 | +21 | 42 | |
| 5 | Trans-Sil Târgu Mureș II | 22 | 10 | 4 | 8 | 59 | 53 | +6 | 34 | |
| 6 | Gliga Companies Reghin | 22 | 10 | 3 | 9 | 63 | 70 | −7 | 33 | |
| 7 | Gaz Metan Daneș | 22 | 9 | 3 | 10 | 38 | 49 | −11 | 30 | |
| 8 | Mureșul Luduș | 22 | 9 | 1 | 12 | 50 | 49 | +1 | 28 | |
| 9 | Victoria Sărățeni | 22 | 9 | 1 | 12 | 53 | 68 | −15 | 28 | |
| 10 | Viitorul 2002 Târnăveni | 22 | 5 | 2 | 15 | 38 | 107 | −69 | 14 (Note: Viitorul 2002 Târnăveni deducted 3 points.) | |
| 11 | Avântul Miheșu de Câmpie | 22 | 3 | 3 | 16 | 35 | 83 | −48 | 12 | |
| 12 | Stejarul Gurghiu | 22 | 0 | 0 | 22 | 7 | 103 | −96 | −6 (Note: Stejarul Gurghiu deducted 6 points.) | |

Rules for classification: 1) Points; 2) Head-to-head points; 3) Head-to-head goal difference; 4) Head-to-head goals scored; 5) Head-to-head away goals scored; 6) Goal difference; 7) Goals scored.
(C) Champions; (Q) Qualified for the phase indicated

=== Neamț County ===
| Pos | Team | Pld | W | D | L | GF | GA | GD | Pts | Qualification or relegation |
|---|---|---|---|---|---|---|---|---|---|---|
| 1 | Cetatea Târgu Neamț (C, Q) | 24 | 21 | 1 | 2 | 111 | 21 | +90 | 64 | Qualification to promotion play-off |
| 2 | Voința Ion Creangă | 24 | 18 | 2 | 4 | 76 | 27 | +49 | 56 | |
| 3 | Victoria Horia | 24 | 17 | 4 | 3 | 70 | 27 | +43 | 55 | |
| 4 | Vulturul Zănești | 24 | 11 | 3 | 10 | 60 | 64 | −4 | 36 | |
| 5 | Victoria Roman | 24 | 10 | 2 | 12 | 51 | 60 | −9 | 32 | |
| 6 | CSȘ Târgu Neamț | 24 | 10 | 2 | 12 | 34 | 53 | −19 | 32 | |
| 7 | Bradul Roznov | 24 | 9 | 4 | 11 | 45 | 49 | −4 | 31 | |
| 8 | Cimentul Bicaz | 24 | 9 | 2 | 13 | 37 | 60 | −23 | 29 | |
| 9 | Viitorul Podoleni | 24 | 8 | 2 | 14 | 52 | 55 | −3 | 26 | |
| 10 | Laminorul Roman II | 24 | 8 | 2 | 14 | 37 | 54 | −17 | 26 | |
| 11 | Voința Pângărați | 24 | 8 | 2 | 14 | 47 | 66 | −19 | 26 | |
| 12 | Biruința Gherăiești | 24 | 8 | 2 | 14 | 41 | 58 | −17 | 26 | |
| 13 | Bradul Borca | 24 | 4 | 2 | 18 | 28 | 95 | −67 | 14 | |
| 14 | Ozana Timișești (Note: Ozana Timișești was excluded from championship and all its results were canceled.) (D) | 0 | 0 | 0 | 0 | 0 | 0 | 0 | 0 | Excluded |

Rules for classification: 1) Points; 2) Head-to-head points; 3) Head-to-head goal difference; 4) Head-to-head goals scored; 5) Head-to-head away goals scored; 6) Goal difference; 7) Goals scored.
(C) Champions; (D) Disqualified; (Q) Qualified for the phase indicated

=== Prahova County ===
| Pos | Team | Pld | W | D | L | GF | GA | GD | Pts | Qualification or relegation |
|---|---|---|---|---|---|---|---|---|---|---|
| 1 | Filipeștii de Pădure (C, Q) | 34 | 29 | 2 | 3 | 124 | 19 | +105 | 89 | Qualification to promotion play-off |
| 2 | Voința Gornet | 34 | 24 | 2 | 8 | 100 | 41 | +59 | 74 | |
| 3 | Petrolul Ploiești III | 34 | 22 | 7 | 5 | 65 | 20 | +45 | 73 | |
| 4 | Petrolul 95 Petrotrans Ploiești | 34 | 19 | 4 | 11 | 80 | 45 | +35 | 61 | |
| 5 | Florești | 34 | 18 | 6 | 10 | 80 | 44 | +36 | 60 | |
| 6 | Bănești-Urleta | 34 | 17 | 6 | 11 | 65 | 53 | +12 | 57 | |
| 7 | Unirea Călinești | 34 | 16 | 7 | 11 | 54 | 40 | +14 | 55 | |
| 8 | Carpați Sinaia | 34 | 15 | 5 | 14 | 73 | 46 | +27 | 50 | |
| 9 | Vălenii de Munte | 34 | 15 | 3 | 16 | 55 | 65 | −10 | 48 | |
| 10 | Caraimanul Euro-Africa Bușteni | 34 | 13 | 8 | 13 | 43 | 51 | −8 | 47 | |
| 11 | Petrolul Teleajen Ploiești | 34 | 13 | 5 | 16 | 46 | 53 | −7 | 44 | |
| 12 | Gloria Vâlcănești | 34 | 12 | 5 | 17 | 57 | 65 | −8 | 41 | |
| 13 | Brazi | 34 | 12 | 2 | 20 | 44 | 56 | −12 | 38 | |
| 14 | Ceptura | 34 | 11 | 5 | 18 | 48 | 89 | −41 | 38 | |
| 15 | Coruna Câmpina (Note: Coruna Câmpina was spared from relegation due to the promotion of Filipeștii de Pădure to Liga III.) | 34 | 10 | 4 | 20 | 49 | 72 | −23 | 34 | Spared from relegation |
| 16 | Voința 2000 Măgurele (R) | 34 | 7 | 6 | 21 | 48 | 89 | −41 | 27 | Relegation to Liga V Prahova |
| 17 | Unirea Tricolor Lipănești (R) | 34 | 6 | 4 | 24 | 55 | 147 | −92 | 22 | Relegation to Liga V Prahova |
| 18 | Petrolul Băicoi (R) | 34 | 4 | 5 | 25 | 43 | 134 | −91 | 17 | Relegation to Liga V Prahova |

Rules for classification: 1) Points; 2) Head-to-head points; 3) Head-to-head goal difference; 4) Head-to-head goals scored; 5) Head-to-head away goals scored; 6) Goal difference; 7) Goals scored.
(C) Champions; (Q) Qualified for the phase indicated; (R) Relegated

=== Sibiu County ===
| Pos | Team | Pld | W | D | L | GF | GA | GD | Pts | Qualification or relegation |
|---|---|---|---|---|---|---|---|---|---|---|
| 1 | Cisnădie (C, Q) | 26 | 24 | 0 | 2 | 118 | 22 | +96 | 72 | Qualification to promotion play-off |
| 2 | CS Sibiu | 26 | 22 | 2 | 2 | 92 | 18 | +74 | 68 | |
| 3 | Universitatea Progresul Sibiu | 26 | 20 | 3 | 3 | 65 | 27 | +38 | 63 | |
| 4 | Atletic Sibiu II | 26 | 13 | 5 | 8 | 63 | 45 | +18 | 44 | |
| 5 | Unirea Ocna Sibiului | 26 | 11 | 7 | 8 | 40 | 43 | −3 | 40 | |
| 6 | Sibiu II | 26 | 12 | 2 | 12 | 62 | 49 | +13 | 38 | |
| 7 | Gaz Metan Mediaș II | 26 | 10 | 2 | 14 | 82 | 58 | +24 | 32 | |
| 8 | Agnitex Agnita | 26 | 9 | 4 | 13 | 43 | 46 | −3 | 31 | |
| 9 | Tălmaciu | 26 | 8 | 5 | 13 | 54 | 53 | +1 | 29 | |
| 10 | Sevișul Șelimbăr | 26 | 8 | 2 | 16 | 36 | 104 | −68 | 26 | |
| 11 | ASA Sibiu | 26 | 7 | 4 | 15 | 49 | 72 | −23 | 25 | |
| 12 | Amicii Copșa Mică | 26 | 6 | 5 | 15 | 48 | 76 | −28 | 23 | |
| 13 | Silvatex Orlat (R) | 26 | 4 | 3 | 19 | 30 | 97 | −67 | 15 | Relegation to Liga V Sibiu |
| 14 | Săliște (R) | 26 | 3 | 2 | 21 | 38 | 109 | −71 | 11 | Relegation to Liga V Sibiu |

Rules for classification: 1) Points; 2) Head-to-head points; 3) Head-to-head goal difference; 4) Head-to-head goals scored; 5) Head-to-head away goals scored; 6) Goal difference; 7) Goals scored.
(C) Champions; (Q) Qualified for the phase indicated; (R) Relegated

=== Suceava County ===
| Pos | Team | Pld | W | D | L | GF | GA | GD | Pts | Qualification or relegation |
|---|---|---|---|---|---|---|---|---|---|---|
| 1 | Rarăul Câmpulung Moldovenesc (C, Q) | 30 | 22 | 4 | 4 | 96 | 17 | +79 | 70 | Qualification to promotion play-off |
| 2 | Viitorul Arbore | 30 | 22 | 3 | 5 | 71 | 18 | +53 | 69 | |
| 3 | Gura Humorului | 30 | 19 | 2 | 9 | 58 | 31 | +27 | 59 | |
| 4 | Rapid CFR Suceava | 30 | 18 | 3 | 9 | 76 | 44 | +32 | 57 | |
| 5 | Unirea Boroaia | 30 | 12 | 4 | 14 | 54 | 48 | +6 | 40 | |
| 6 | Minerul Iacobeni | 30 | 13 | 1 | 16 | 51 | 53 | −2 | 40 | |
| 7 | Bradul Putna | 30 | 12 | 4 | 14 | 50 | 64 | −14 | 40 | |
| 8 | Suhardul Ciocănești | 30 | 13 | 1 | 16 | 55 | 77 | −22 | 40 | |
| 9 | Zimbrul Siret | 30 | 11 | 5 | 14 | 73 | 67 | +6 | 38 | |
| 10 | Juventus Fălticeni II | 30 | 12 | 2 | 16 | 49 | 60 | −11 | 38 | |
| 11 | Bucovina Rădăuți | 30 | 10 | 6 | 14 | 58 | 59 | −1 | 36 | |
| 12 | Vivipet Bădeuți | 30 | 12 | 0 | 18 | 49 | 54 | −5 | 36 | |
| 13 | Foresta Moldovița | 30 | 10 | 6 | 14 | 40 | 64 | −24 | 36 | |
| 14 | Avântul Todirești | 30 | 10 | 5 | 15 | 41 | 68 | −27 | 35 | |
| 15 | Flacăra Roșie Udești (R) | 30 | 11 | 1 | 18 | 60 | 104 | −44 | 34 | Relegation to Liga V Suceava |
| 16 | Viitorul Liteni (R) | 30 | 9 | 1 | 20 | 58 | 98 | −40 | 28 | Relegation to Liga V Suceava |

Rules for classification: 1) Points; 2) Head-to-head points; 3) Head-to-head goal difference; 4) Head-to-head goals scored; 5) Head-to-head away goals scored; 6) Goal difference; 7) Goals scored.
(C) Champions; (Q) Qualified for the phase indicated; (R) Relegated

=== Vâlcea County ===
| Pos | Team | Pld | W | D | L | GF | GA | GD | Pts | Qualification or relegation |
|---|---|---|---|---|---|---|---|---|---|---|
| 1 | Sportul Râmnicu Vâlcea (C, Q) | 34 | 27 | 3 | 4 | 108 | 40 | +68 | 84 | Qualification to promotion play-off |
| 2 | Hidroelectra Râmnicu Vâlcea | 34 | 23 | 9 | 2 | 101 | 35 | +66 | 78 | |
| 3 | Râmnicu Vâlcea II | 34 | 24 | 3 | 7 | 111 | 28 | +83 | 75 | |
| 4 | Minerul Berbești | 34 | 21 | 7 | 6 | 108 | 34 | +74 | 70 | |
| 5 | Șirineasa | 34 | 20 | 5 | 9 | 85 | 52 | +33 | 65 | |
| 6 | Topologul Nicolae Bălcescu | 34 | 19 | 1 | 14 | 81 | 63 | +18 | 58 | |
| 7 | Vartex Râmnicu Vâlcea | 34 | 15 | 10 | 9 | 68 | 45 | +23 | 55 | |
| 8 | Flacăra Horezu | 34 | 15 | 4 | 15 | 94 | 91 | +3 | 49 | |
| 9 | Cozia Râmnicu Vâlcea | 34 | 12 | 4 | 18 | 65 | 80 | −15 | 40 | |
| 10 | Luncavățul Popești | 34 | 11 | 6 | 17 | 51 | 63 | −12 | 39 | |
| 11 | Alma Lex Drăgășani | 34 | 10 | 7 | 17 | 60 | 77 | −17 | 37 | |
| 12 | Govora | 34 | 11 | 3 | 20 | 57 | 98 | −41 | 36 | |
| 13 | Forestierul Băbeni | 34 | 10 | 5 | 19 | 47 | 77 | −30 | 35 | |
| 14 | Oltețul Zătreni | 34 | 9 | 8 | 17 | 53 | 77 | −24 | 35 | |
| 15 | Petrolul II Drăgășani (R) | 34 | 9 | 8 | 17 | 51 | 77 | −26 | 35 | Relegation to Liga V Vâlcea |
| 16 | Minerul Costești (R) | 34 | 9 | 2 | 23 | 50 | 108 | −58 | 29 | Relegation to Liga V Vâlcea |
| 17 | Genesis Lotru Brezoi (R) | 34 | 10 | 4 | 20 | 67 | 114 | −47 | 26 (Note: Genesis Lotru Brezoi deducted 8 points.) | Relegation to Liga V Vâlcea |
| 18 | Unirea Tomșani (R) | 34 | 4 | 4 | 26 | 40 | 137 | −97 | 16 | Relegation to Liga V Vâlcea |

Rules for classification: 1) Points; 2) Head-to-head points; 3) Head-to-head goal difference; 4) Head-to-head goals scored; 5) Head-to-head away goals scored; 6) Goal difference; 7) Goals scored.
(C) Champions; (Q) Qualified for the phase indicated; (R) Relegated

=== Vrancea County ===
Championship play-off
Quarter-finals

| Team 1 | Score | Team 2 |
|---|---|---|
| Energia Vulturu | 3–1 | Voința Odobești |
| Viitorul Homocea | 3–1 | Dumitrești |
| Panciu | 4–2 | Zorile Cotești |
| Național Golești | 3–0 (Note: The match Național Golești - Unirea Bolotești 1–2 would be approved with 3–0. The team from Bolotești used two players without the right to play.) | Unirea Bolotești |

Semi-finals

The semi-finals were played on 31 May 2007 and 3 June 2007.

| Team 1 | Score | Team 2 |
|---|---|---|
| Energia Vulturu | 3–0 | Viitorul Homocea |
| Panciu | 2–0 | Național Golești |

Final

The championship final was played on 7 June 2007 at Milcovul Stadium in Focșani.

| Team 1 | Score | Team 2 |
|---|---|---|
| Energia Vulturu | 3–0 | Panciu |

Energia Vulturu won the Liga IV Vrancea County and qualify to promotion play-off in Liga III.

== See also ==
- 2006–07 Liga I
- 2006–07 Liga II
- 2006–07 Liga III
