= FC Panciu =

Romanian association football club

- Full name: Fotbal Club Panciu
- Nicknames: Păncenii (The People from Panciu)
- Short name: Panciu
- Founded: 1958; 68 years ago
- Ground: Orășenesc
- Capacity: 1,200
- Owner: Panciu Town
- Chairman: Adrian Brânză
- League: Liga IV
- 2025–26: Liga IV, Vrancea County, 7th of 14
Home colours	Away colours

Fotbal Club Panciu, commonly known as FC Panciu, or simply as Panciu, is a Romanian football club based in Panciu, Vrancea County, currently competes in Liga IV – Vrancea County, the fourth tier of the Romanian football league system.

During over time the club has had several names such as: Viticultorul, Rapid, Tricotex, CS Panciu and Young Stars.

== History ==
FC Panciu, with former referee Ionică Serea as head coach, promoted to Liga III at the end of 2007–08 season winning the Liga IV – Vrancea County and the promotion play-off against FC Vaslui II, the winner of Liga IV – Vaslui County, 1–0 on neutral ground at Aerostar Stadium in Bacău.

The side enjoyed success in its return to the third league, finishing four consecutive seasons in the first part of the league table; ″Păncenii″, led by Ionică Serea, were finished 5th in the first season, in order that in the 2009–10 season, despite under a succession of managers – Serea departed in January 2010 and replaced with Sorin Haraga as head coach, supervised by Damian Băncilă as technical director, and from May 2010 with Vasile Burgă as head coach, for the last five games of the season – the team between the vineyards finished as runners-up.

Haraga returned as head coach for 2010–11 season, but financial troubles precipitated another succession of managers – after five rounds Raul Cioran replaced Haraga, and in April 2011, after 22 rounds, Serea were back as head coach and led the team to finish in 6th-place. In the 2011–12 season, Panciu finished in 7th-place.

In the summer of 2012, the club was renamed as Young Stars Panciu, and Dănuț Bolocan was appointed as the new head coach, but faced with major financial problems, the team from Panciu withdrew from championship after the first part of the 2012–13 season.

In the first season back in the fourth league, Young Stars finished 2nd with 49 points, 11 points behind Selena Jariștea, despite leading the table by 4 points at the end of the first part of the season.

In the 2014–15 season, renamed again as FC Panciu, the club led by Dănuț Bolocan from the bench, won the Liga IV – Vrancea County and the promotion play-off against Victoria Traian, the winner of Liga IV – Brăila County 7–4 on aggregate (1–1 away and 6–3 at home), promoted to Liga III.

FC Panciu finished the following season in 9th place, but due to the financial problems could no longer register for next season of the third league. Starting from scratch in the 5th league, Panciu, finishing 2nd, promoted to Liga IV – Vrancea County at the end of the 2016–17 season.

In the 2017–18 season, Panciu finished 2nd in the Group C of Liga IV – Vrancea County, qualifying to championship play-off and conclude the season on 8th place.

The next season was a successful one, the team led by Dănuț Bolocan for the seventh consecutive year, finished 2nd in Group A of the regular season and as runner-up in the championship play-off, five points behind Mausoleul Mărășești.

In the 2019–20 season, FC Panciu ranked 1st in Series C of Liga IV Vrancea and qualified to championship play-offs, being on 3rd place when the season was halted due to the COVID-19 pandemic.

== Honours ==
Liga III

- Runners-up (1): 2009–10

Liga IV – Vrancea County

- Winners (8): 1976–77, 1978–79, 1980–81, 1988–89, 1997–98, 1998–99, 2007–08, 2014–15
- Runners-up (3): 2006–07, 2013–14, 2018–19

Liga V – Vrancea County

- Runners-up (1): 2016–17
