= Liga IV Vrancea =

Fourth tier Romanian football league

- Founded: 1968
- Country: Romania
- Level on pyramid: 4
- Promotion to: Liga III
- Relegation to: Liga V Vrancea
- Domestic cup: Cupa României – County phase
- Current champions: Victoria Gologanu (1st title) (2025–26)
- Most championships: Panciu (8 titles)
- Website: ajfvrancea.ro
- Current: 2025–26 Liga IV Vrancea

Liga IV Vrancea (known as Superliga Altdorf Tehnik for sponsorship reasons) is one of the regional football divisions of Liga IV, the fourth tier of the Romanian football league system, for clubs based in Vrancea County, and is organized by AJF Vrancea – Asociația Județeană de Fotbal (lit. 'County Football Association').

It is contested by a variable number of teams, depending on the number of teams relegated from Liga III, the number of teams promoted from Liga V Vrancea, and the teams that withdraw or enter the competition. The winner may or may not be promoted to Liga III, depending on the result of a promotion play-off contested against the winner of a neighboring county series.

== History ==
In 1968, following the new administrative and territorial reorganization of the country, each county established its own football championship, integrating teams from the former regional championships as well as those that had previously competed in town and rayon-level competitions. The newly formed Vrancea County Championship was placed under the authority of the Consiliul Județean pentru Educație Fizică și Sport (lit. 'County Council for Physical Education and Sports') in Vrancea County.

Since then, the structure and organization of Vrancea’s main county competition have undergone numerous changes. Between 1968 and 1992, the main county competition was known as the Campionatul Județean (County Championship). Starting in 1992, the competition has been organized by the AJF Vrancea – Asociația Județeană de Fotbal (lit. 'County Football Association'). Between 1992 and 1997, it was renamed Divizia C – Faza Județeană (Divizia C – County Phase), followed by Divizia D from 1997, and it has been known as Liga IV since 2006. Beginning in 2014, the league has been officially known as Superliga Altdorf Tehnik for sponsorship reasons.

== Promotion ==
The champions of each county association play against one another in a play-off to earn promotion to Liga III. Geographical criteria are taken into consideration when the play-offs are drawn. In total, there are 41 county champions plus the Bucharest municipal champion.

== List of Champions ==
=== Putna Regional Championship ===
Ed.	Season	Winners
1	1951	CSA Tecuci
2	1952	Vulturii MFA Focșani

=== Vrancea County Championship ===
Ed.	Season	Winners
County Championship
1	1968–69	Locomotiva Adjud
2	1969–70	Chimica Mărășești
3	1970–71	Luceafărul Focșani
4	1971–72	Locomotiva Adjud
5	1972–73	Luceafărul Focșani
6	1973–74	Dinamo Focșani
7	1974–75	Foresta Gugești
8	1975–76	Dinamo Focșani
9	1976–77	Rapid Panciu
10	1977–78	Energia Vulturu
11	1978–79	Rapid Panciu
12	1979–80	Constructorul Odobești
13	1980–81	Rapid Panciu
14	1981–82	Constructorul Voința Odobești
15	1982–83	Siretul Suraia
16	1983–84	Siretul Suraia
17	1984–85	Laminorul Focșani
18	1985–86	Energia Milcovul Focșani
19	1986–87	Autobuzul IJTL Focșani
20	1987–88	Autobuzul IJTL Focșani
21	1988–89	Tricotex Panciu
22	1989–90	IPREROM Doaga
23	1990–91	Energia Vulturu
24	1991–92	Energia Vulturu
Divizia C – County phase
25	1992–93	Energia Focșani
26	1993–94	Prod Câmpineanca
27	1994–95	Prod Câmpineanca
28	1995–96	Siretul Suraia
29	1996–97	Siretul Suraia
Divizia D
30	1997–98	Tricotex Panciu
31	1998–99	Tricotex Panciu
32	1999–00	Steaua Focșani
33	2000–01	Juventus Focșani
34	2001–02	Șoimii Nisprod Mircești
35	2002–03	Daiana Odobești
36	2003–04	Energia Vulturu
37	2004–05	Dorecom Reghiu
38	2005–06	Șoimii Nisprod Mircești

Ed.	Season	Winners
Liga IV
39	2006–07	Energia Vulturu
40	2007–08	Panciu
41	2008–09	Dumitrești
42	2009–10	Adjud
43	2010–11	Național Golești
44	2011–12	Național Golești
45	2012–13	Național Golești
46	2013–14	Selena Jariștea
47	2014–15	Panciu
48	2015–16	Euromania Dumbrăveni
49	2016–17	Focșani
50	2017–18	Sportul Ciorăști
51	2018–19	Mausoleul Mărășești
52	2019–20	Not awarded (Note: The season was abandoned in March 2020 because of the COVID-19 pandemic in Romania and no teams were declared county champion.)
53	2020–21	Inizio Focșani
54	2021–22	Victoria Gugești
55	2022–23	Victoria Gugești
56	2023–24	Adjud 1946
57	2024–25	Victoria Gugești
58	2025–26	Victoria Gologanu

== See also ==
=== Main Leagues ===
- Liga I
- Liga II
- Liga III
- Liga IV

=== County Leagues (Liga IV series) ===
North–East

- Liga IV Bacău
- Liga IV Botoșani
- Liga IV Iași
- Liga IV Neamț
- Liga IV Suceava
- Liga IV Vaslui

North–West

- Liga IV Bihor
- Liga IV Bistrița-Năsăud
- Liga IV Cluj
- Liga IV Maramureș
- Liga IV Satu Mare
- Liga IV Sălaj

Center

- Liga IV Alba
- Liga IV Brașov
- Liga IV Covasna
- Liga IV Harghita
- Liga IV Mureș
- Liga IV Sibiu

West

- Liga IV Arad
- Liga IV Caraș-Severin
- Liga IV Gorj
- Liga IV Hunedoara
- Liga IV Mehedinți
- Liga IV Timiș

South–West

- Liga IV Argeș
- Liga IV Dâmbovița
- Liga IV Dolj
- Liga IV Olt
- Liga IV Teleorman
- Liga IV Vâlcea

South

- Liga IV Bucharest
- Liga IV Călărași
- Liga IV Giurgiu
- Liga IV Ialomița
- Liga IV Ilfov
- Liga IV Prahova

South–East

- Liga IV Brăila
- Liga IV Buzău
- Liga IV Constanța
- Liga IV Galați
- Liga IV Tulcea
- Liga IV Vrancea
