= Liga IV Brăila =

Fourth tier Romanian football league

- Founded: 1968
- Country: Romania
- Level on pyramid: 4
- Promotion to: Liga III
- Relegation to: Liga V – Brăila County
- Domestic cup: Cupa României – County phase
- Current champions: Făurei (3rd title) (2025–26)
- Most championships: Progresul Brăila and Victoria Traian (5 titles each)
- Website: frf-ajf.ro/braila
- Current: 2025–26 Liga IV Brăila

Liga IV Brăila is one of the regional football divisions of Liga IV, the fourth tier of the Romanian football league system, for clubs based in Brăila County, and is organized by AJF Brăila – Asociația Județeană de Fotbal (lit. 'County Football Association').

It is contested by a variable number of teams, depending on the number of teams relegated from Liga III, the number of teams promoted from Liga V Brăila, and the teams that withdraw or enter the competition. The winner may or may not be promoted to Liga III, depending on the result of a promotion play-off contested against the winner of a neighboring county series.

== History ==
The Brăila County Championship was formed in 1968 and placed under the authority of the newly created Consiliul Județean pentru Educație Fizică și Sport (lit. 'County Council for Physical Education and Sports') in Brăila County. This occurred as part of the broader new administrative and territorial reorganization of the country, during which each county established its own football championship, integrating teams from the former regional championships as well as those that had previously competed in town and rayon level competitions.

Since then, the structure and organization of Brăila’s main county competition, like those of other county championships, have undergone numerous changes. Between 1968 and 1992, it was known as Campionatul Județean (County Championship). In 1992, it was renamed Divizia C – Faza Județeană (Divizia C – County Phase), became Divizia D in 1997, and has been known as Liga IV since 2006.

== Promotion ==
The champions of each county association play against one another in a play-off to earn promotion to Liga III. Geographical criteria are taken into consideration when the play-offs are drawn. In total, there are 41 county champions plus the Bucharest municipal champion.

== List of champions ==
Ed.	Season	Winners
County Championship
1	1968–69	Dunărea Brăila
2	1969–70	Unirea Tricolor Brăila
3	1970–71	Dunărea Brăila
4	1971–72	Comerțul Brăila
5	1972–73	Portul Brăila
6	1973–74	Automobilul Brăila
7	1974–75	Autobuzul Făurei
8	1975–76	Constructorul Brăila
9	1976–77	Constructorul Brăila
10	1977–78	Tractorul Viziru
11	1978–79	Șantierul Naval Brăila
12	1979–80	Tractorul Viziru
13	1980–81	Autobuzul Făurei
14	1981–82	Petrolul Brăila
15	1982–83	Tractorul Viziru
16	1983–84	Progresul Brăila
17	1984–85	Progresul Brăila
18	1985–86	Progresul Brăila
19	1986–87	Progresul Brăila
20	1987–88	Automobilul Însurăței
21	1988–89	Chimia Brăila
22	1989–90	Automobilul Însurăței
23	1990–91	Laminorul Brăila
24	1991–92	Dacia Lamirom Brăila
Divizia C – County phase
25	1992–93	Șantierul Naval Brăila
26	1993–94	Romgal Romanu
27	1994–95	Chimia Brăila
28	1995–96	Dunacor Brăila
29	1996–97	Romgal Romanu
Divizia D
30	1997–98	Petrolul Brăila
31	1998–99	Dunacor Brăila
32	1999–00	Scorillo Grădiștea
33	2000–01	FC Ianca
34	2001–02	Start Corolla Movila Miresei
35	2002–03	Mondial Brăila
36	2003–04	Start Corolla Movila Miresei
37	2004–05	Făurei
38	2005–06	Viitorul Însurăței

Ed.	Season	Winners
Liga IV
39	2006–07	CSO Ianca
40	2007–08	Steaua Brăila
41	2008–09	Viitorul Ianca
42	2009–10	Recolta Tufești
43	2010–11	Avântul Conpet Cireșu
44	2011–12	Victoria Traian
45	2012–13	Avântul Conpet Cireșu
46	2013–14	Viitorul Însurăței
47	2014–15	Victoria Traian
48	2015–16	Sportul Chiscani
49	2016–17	Victoria Traian
50	2017–18	Făurei
51	2018–19	Viitorul Ianca
52	2019–20	Sportul Chiscani
–	2020–21	Not disputed (Note: Not disputed due to COVID-19 pandemic in Romania.)
53	2021–22	Victoria Traian
54	2022–23	Viitorul Șuțești
55	2023–24	Viitorul Cireșu
56	2024–25	Victoria Traian
57	2025–26	Făurei

== See also ==
=== Main Leagues ===
- Liga I
- Liga II
- Liga III
- Liga IV

=== County Leagues (Liga IV series) ===
North–East

- Liga IV Bacău
- Liga IV Botoșani
- Liga IV Iași
- Liga IV Neamț
- Liga IV Suceava
- Liga IV Vaslui

North–West

- Liga IV Bihor
- Liga IV Bistrița-Năsăud
- Liga IV Cluj
- Liga IV Maramureș
- Liga IV Satu Mare
- Liga IV Sălaj

Center

- Liga IV Alba
- Liga IV Brașov
- Liga IV Covasna
- Liga IV Harghita
- Liga IV Mureș
- Liga IV Sibiu

West

- Liga IV Arad
- Liga IV Caraș-Severin
- Liga IV Gorj
- Liga IV Hunedoara
- Liga IV Mehedinți
- Liga IV Timiș

South–West

- Liga IV Argeș
- Liga IV Dâmbovița
- Liga IV Dolj
- Liga IV Olt
- Liga IV Teleorman
- Liga IV Vâlcea

South

- Liga IV Bucharest
- Liga IV Călărași
- Liga IV Giurgiu
- Liga IV Ialomița
- Liga IV Ilfov
- Liga IV Prahova

South–East

- Liga IV Brăila
- Liga IV Buzău
- Liga IV Constanța
- Liga IV Galați
- Liga IV Tulcea
- Liga IV Vrancea
