= Liga IV Harghita =

Fourth tier Romanian football league

- Founded: 1968
- Country: Romania
- Level on pyramid: 4
- Promotion to: Liga III
- Relegation to: Liga V Harghita
- Domestic cup: Cupa României – County phase
- Current champions: Sânsimion (1st title) (2025–26)
- Most championships: Csíkszereda Miercurea Ciuc (14 titles)
- Website: frf-ajf.ro/harghita
- Current: 2025–26 Liga IV Harghita

Liga IV Harghita is one of the regional football divisions of Liga IV, the fourth tier of the Romanian football league system, for clubs based in Harghita County, and is organized by AJF Harghita – Asociația Județeană de Fotbal (lit. 'County Football Association').

It is contested by a variable number of teams, depending on the number of teams relegated from Liga III, the number of teams promoted from Liga V Harghita, and the teams that withdraw or enter the competition. The winner may or may not be promoted to Liga III, depending on the result of a promotion play-off contested against the winner of a neighboring county series.

== History ==
In 1968, following the new administrative and territorial reorganization of the country, each county established its own football championship, integrating teams from the former regional championships as well as those that had previously competed in town and rayon level competitions. The freshly formed Harghita County Championship was placed under the authority of the newly created Consiliul Județean pentru Educație Fizică și Sport (lit. 'County Council for Physical Education and Sports') in Harghita County.

Since then, the structure and organization of Liga IV Harghita, like those of other county championships, have undergone numerous changes. Between 1968 and 1992, the main county competition was known as the Campionatul Județean (County Championship). Between 1992 and 1997, it was renamed Divizia C – Faza Județeană (Divizia C – County Phase), followed by Divizia D starting in 1997, and since 2006, it has been known as Liga IV.

== Promotion ==
The champions of each county association play against one another in a play-off to earn promotion to Liga III. Geographical criteria are taken into consideration when the play-offs are drawn. In total, there are 41 county champions plus the Bucharest municipal champion.

== List of Champions ==
Ed.	Season	Winners
County Championship
1	1968–69	Viitorul Gheorgheni
2	1969–70	Minerul Miercurea Ciuc
3	1970–71	Minerul Miercurea Ciuc
4	1971–72	Mureșul Toplița
5	1972–73	Miercurea Ciuc
6	1973–74	Harghita Odorheiu Secuiesc
7	1974–75	Mureșul Toplița
8	1975–76	Mureșul Toplița
9	1976–77	IUPS Miercurea Ciuc
10	1977–78	Mureșul Toplița
11	1978–79	Mureșul Toplița
12	1979–80	Unirea Cristuru Secuiesc
13	1980–81	Unirea Cristuru Secuiesc
14	1981–82	Flamura Roșie Sânsimion
15	1982–83	Metalul Vlăhița
16	1983–84	Progresul Odorheiu Secuiesc
17	1984–85	Tractorul Miercurea Ciuc
18	1985–86	Tractorul Miercurea Ciuc
19	1986–87	Mureșul Toplița
20	1987–88	Rapid Miercurea Ciuc
21	1988–89	Mureșul Toplița
22	1989–90	Minerul Bălan
23	1990–91	Metalul Vlăhița
24	1991–92	Complexul Gălăuțaș
Divizia C – County phase
25	1992–93	Rapid Miercurea Ciuc
26	1993–94	Vulturul Remetea
27	1994–95	Vulturul Carpatin Gheorgheni
28	1995–96	ASA Rapid Miercurea Ciuc
29	1996–97	ASA Rapid Miercurea Ciuc
Divizia D
30	1997–98	Budvar Odorheiu Secuiesc
31	1998–99	ASA Rapid Miercurea Ciuc
32	1999–00	Unirea Cristuru Secuiesc
33	2000–01	Viitorul Gheorgheni
34	2001–02	Minerul Bălan
35	2002–03	Minerul Bălan
36	2003–04	Viitorul Gheorgheni
37	2004–05	Știința Sărmaș
38	2005–06	Roseal Odorheiu Secuiesc

Ed.	Season	Winners
Liga IV
39	2006–07	Viitorul Gheorgheni
40	2007–08	ASA Miercurea Ciuc Bălan
41	2008–09	Roseal Odorheiu Secuiesc
42	2009–10	ASA Miercurea Ciuc Bălan
43	2010–11	ASA Miercurea Ciuc Bălan
44	2011–12	Miercurea Ciuc
45	2012–13	Miercurea Ciuc
46	2013–14	Csíkszereda Miercurea Ciuc
47	2014–15	Odorheiu Secuiesc
48	2015–16	Unirea Cristuru Secuiesc
49	2016–17	Pro Mureșul Toplița
50	2017–18	Unirea Cristuru Secuiesc
51	2018–19	Gheorgheni
52	2019–20	Gheorgheni; Sporting Odorheiu Secuiesc (Note: 2019–20 Liga IV Harghita suspended in March 2020 because of the COVID-19 pandemic in Romania – season curtailed and final standings declared on 14 July 2020, teams ranked first in the two series was declared champions.)
–	2020–21	Not disputed (Note: Not disputed due to COVID-19 pandemic in Romania.)
53	2021–22	Gheorgheni
54	2022–23	Gheorgheni
55	2023–24	Gheorgheni
56	2024–25	Unirea Cristuru Secuiesc
57	2025–26	Sânsimion

== See also ==
=== Main Leagues ===
- Liga I
- Liga II
- Liga III
- Liga IV

=== County Leagues (Liga IV series) ===
North–East

- Liga IV Bacău
- Liga IV Botoșani
- Liga IV Iași
- Liga IV Neamț
- Liga IV Suceava
- Liga IV Vaslui

North–West

- Liga IV Bihor
- Liga IV Bistrița-Năsăud
- Liga IV Cluj
- Liga IV Maramureș
- Liga IV Satu Mare
- Liga IV Sălaj

Center

- Liga IV Alba
- Liga IV Brașov
- Liga IV Covasna
- Liga IV Harghita
- Liga IV Mureș
- Liga IV Sibiu

West

- Liga IV Arad
- Liga IV Caraș-Severin
- Liga IV Gorj
- Liga IV Hunedoara
- Liga IV Mehedinți
- Liga IV Timiș

South–West

- Liga IV Argeș
- Liga IV Dâmbovița
- Liga IV Dolj
- Liga IV Olt
- Liga IV Teleorman
- Liga IV Vâlcea

South

- Liga IV Bucharest
- Liga IV Călărași
- Liga IV Giurgiu
- Liga IV Ialomița
- Liga IV Ilfov
- Liga IV Prahova

South–East

- Liga IV Brăila
- Liga IV Buzău
- Liga IV Constanța
- Liga IV Galați
- Liga IV Tulcea
- Liga IV Vrancea
