= Liga IV Mehedinți =

Fourth tier Romanian football league

- Founded: 1968
- Country: Romania
- Level on pyramid: 4
- Promotion to: Liga III
- Relegation to: Liga V Mehedinți
- Domestic cup: Cupa României – County phase
- Current champions: Drobeta-Turnu Severin (1st title) (2025–26)
- Most championships: Viitorul Șimian (7 titles)
- Website: frf-ajf.ro/mehedinti
- Current: 2025–26 Liga IV Mehedinți

Liga IV Mehedinți is one of the regional football divisions of Liga IV, the fourth tier of the Romanian football league system, for clubs based in Mehedinți County, and is organized by AJF Mehedinți – Asociația Județeană de Fotbal (lit. 'County Football Association').

It is contested by a variable number of teams, depending on the number of teams relegated from Liga III, the number of teams promoted from Liga V Mehedinți, and the teams that withdraw or enter the competition. The winner may or may not be promoted to Liga III, depending on the result of a promotion play-off contested against the winner of a neighboring county series.

== History ==
In 1968, following the new administrative and territorial reorganization of the country, each county established its own football championship, integrating teams from the former regional championships as well as those that had previously competed in town and rayon level competitions. The freshly formed Mehedinți County Championship was placed under the authority of the newly created Consiliul Județean pentru Educație Fizică și Sport (lit. 'County Council for Physical Education and Sports') in Mehedinți County.

Since then, the structure and organization of Liga IV Mehedinți, like those of other county championships, have undergone numerous changes. Between 1968 and 1992, the main county competition was known as the Campionatul Județean (County Championship). Between 1992 and 1997, it was renamed Divizia C – Faza Județeană (Divizia C – County Phase), followed by Divizia D starting in 1997, and since 2006, it has been known as Liga IV.

== Promotion ==
The champions of each county association play against one another in a play-off to earn promotion to Liga III. Geographical criteria are taken into consideration when the play-offs are drawn. In total, there are 41 county champions plus the Bucharest municipal champion.

== List of champions ==
| Ed. | Season | Winners |
County Championship
| 1 | 1968–69 | Unirea Orșova |
| 2 | 1969–70 | Victoria Vânju Mare |
| 3 | 1970–71 | Progresul Strehaia |
| 4 | 1971–72 | Cutezătorii Orșova |
| 5 | 1972–73 | CIL Drobeta-Turnu Severin |
| 6 | 1973–74 | Dierna Orșova |
| 7 | 1974–75 | TCI Drobeta-Turnu Severin |
| 8 | 1975–76 | Mecanizatorul Șimian |
| 9 | 1976–77 | Mecanizatorul Șimian |
| 10 | 1977–78 | Gloria Drobeta-Turnu Severin |
| 11 | 1978–79 | Unirea Drobeta-Turnu Severin |
| 12 | 1979–80 | Mecanizatorul Șimian |
| 13 | 1980–81 | Unirea Livezile |
| 14 | 1981–82 | Armătura Strehaia |
| 15 | 1982–83 | Azbestul Dubova |
| 16 | 1983–84 | Victoria Vânju Mare |
| 17 | 1984–85 | Victoria Vânju Mare |
| 18 | 1985–86 | Înainte Foresta Vânju Mare |
| 19 | 1986–87 | Celuloza Drobeta-Turnu Severin |
| 20 | 1987–88 | Armătura Strehaia |
| 21 | 1988–89 | CSM Drobeta-Turnu Severin |
| 22 | 1989–90 | Armătura Strehaia |
| 23 | 1990–91 | CSM Drobeta-Turnu Severin |
| 24 | 1991–92 | Termo Drobeta-Turnu Severin |
Divizia C – County phase
| 25 | 1992–93 | Severnav Drobeta-Turnu Severin |
| 26 | 1993–94 | Severnav Drobeta-Turnu Severin |
| 27 | 1994–95 | Severnav Drobeta-Turnu Severin |
| 28 | 1995–96 | Termo Drobeta-Turnu Severin |
| 29 | 1996–97 | Severnav Drobeta-Turnu Severin |
Divizia D
| 30 | 1997–98 | Dierna Orșova |
| 31 | 1998–99 | Severnav Drobeta-Turnu Severin |
| 32 | 1999–00 | Dierna Orșova |
| 33 | 2000–01 | Constructorul Drobeta-Turnu Severin |
| 34 | 2001–02 | Real Vânju Mare |
| 35 | 2002–03 | Minerul Mehedinți Valea Copcii |
| 36 | 2003–04 | Auxerre Orșova |
| 37 | 2004–05 | Agromec Șimian |
| 38 | 2005–06 | Unirea Vânători |

| Ed. | Season | Winners |
Liga IV
| 39 | 2006–07 | Pandurii Cerneți |
| 40 | 2007–08 | Victoria Devesel |
| 41 | 2008–09 | Agromec Șimian |
| 42 | 2009–10 | Termo Drobeta-Turnu Severin |
| 43 | 2010–11 | Dunărea Pristol |
| 44 | 2011–12 | Pandurii Cerneți |
| 45 | 2012–13 | Recolta Dănceu |
| 46 | 2013–14 | Minerul Mehedinți Valea Copcii |
| 47 | 2014–15 | Pandurii Cerneți |
| 48 | 2015–16 | Pandurii Cerneți |
| 49 | 2016–17 | Strehaia |
| 50 | 2017–18 | Viitorul Șimian |
| 51 | 2018–19 | Strehaia |
| 52 | 2019–20 | Recolta Dănceu |
| 53 | 2020–21 | Viitorul Șimian |
| 54 | 2021–22 | Recolta Dănceu |
| 55 | 2022–23 | Recolta Dănceu |
| 56 | 2023–24 | Viitorul Severin |
| 57 | 2024–25 | Viitorul Severin |
| 58 | 2025–26 | Drobeta-Turnu Severin |

== See also ==
=== Main Leagues ===
- Liga I
- Liga II
- Liga III
- Liga IV

=== County Leagues (Liga IV series) ===
North–East

- Liga IV Bacău
- Liga IV Botoșani
- Liga IV Iași
- Liga IV Neamț
- Liga IV Suceava
- Liga IV Vaslui

North–West

- Liga IV Bihor
- Liga IV Bistrița-Năsăud
- Liga IV Cluj
- Liga IV Maramureș
- Liga IV Satu Mare
- Liga IV Sălaj

Center

- Liga IV Alba
- Liga IV Brașov
- Liga IV Covasna
- Liga IV Harghita
- Liga IV Mureș
- Liga IV Sibiu

West

- Liga IV Arad
- Liga IV Caraș-Severin
- Liga IV Gorj
- Liga IV Hunedoara
- Liga IV Mehedinți
- Liga IV Timiș

South–West

- Liga IV Argeș
- Liga IV Dâmbovița
- Liga IV Dolj
- Liga IV Olt
- Liga IV Teleorman
- Liga IV Vâlcea

South

- Liga IV Bucharest
- Liga IV Călărași
- Liga IV Giurgiu
- Liga IV Ialomița
- Liga IV Ilfov
- Liga IV Prahova

South–East

- Liga IV Brăila
- Liga IV Buzău
- Liga IV Constanța
- Liga IV Galați
- Liga IV Tulcea
- Liga IV Vrancea
