= Liga IV Tulcea =

Fourth tier Romanian football league

- Founded: 1968
- Country: Romania
- Level on pyramid: 4
- Promotion to: Liga III
- Relegation to: Liga V Tulcea
- Domestic cup: Cupa României – County phase
- Current champions: Pescărușul Sarichioi (7th title) (2025–26)
- Most championships: Granitul Babadag (8 titles)
- Website: frf-ajf.ro/tulcea
- Current: 2025–26 Liga IV Tulcea

Liga IV Tulcea is one of the regional football divisions of Liga IV, the fourth tier of the Romanian football league system, for clubs based in Tulcea County, and is organized by AJF Tulcea – Asociația Județeană de Fotbal (lit. 'County Football Association').

It is contested by a variable number of teams, depending on the number of teams relegated from Liga III, the number of teams promoted from Liga V Tulcea, and the teams that withdraw or enter the competition. The winner may or may not be promoted to Liga III, depending on the result of a promotion play-off contested against the winner of a neighboring county series.

== History ==
In 1968, following the new administrative and territorial reorganization of the country, each county established its own football championship, integrating teams from the former regional championships as well as those that had previously competed in town and rayon level competitions. The freshly formed Tulcea County Championship was placed under the authority of the newly created Consiliul Județean pentru Educație Fizică și Sport (lit. 'County Council for Physical Education and Sports') in Tulcea County.

Since then, the structure and organization of Liga IV Tulcea, like those of other county championships, have undergone numerous changes. Between 1968 and 1992, the main county competition was known as the Campionatul Județean (County Championship). Between 1992 and 1997, it was renamed Divizia C – Faza Județeană (Divizia C – County Phase), followed by Divizia D starting in 1997, and since 2006, it has been known as Liga IV.

== Promotion ==
The champions of each county association play against one another in a play-off to earn promotion to Liga III. Geographical criteria are taken into consideration when the play-offs are drawn. In total, there are 41 county champions plus the Bucharest municipal champion.

== List of champions ==
Ed.	Season	Winners
County Championship
1	1968–69	Minerul Măcin
2	1969–70	Vulturul Tulcea
3	1970–71	Granitul Babadag
4	1971–72	Minerul Măcin
5	1972–73	Arrubium Măcin
6	1973–74	Recolta Frecăței
7	1974–75	Minerul Măcin
8	1975–76	Alumina Tulcea
9	1976–77	Granitul Babadag
10	1977–78	Arrubium Măcin
11	1978–79	Progresul Isaccea
12	1979–80	Viitorul Mahmudia
13	1980–81	Granitul Babadag
14	1981–82	Șoimii Topolog
15	1982–83	Șoimii Topolog
16	1983–84	Granitul Babadag
17	1984–85	Granitul Babadag
18	1985–86	Minerul Mahmudia
19	1986–87	Săgeata Stejaru
20	1987–88	Granitul Babadag
21	1988–89	Razelm Unirea Jurilovca
22	1989–90	Fortuna Tulcea
23	1990–91	Granitul Babadag
24	1991–92	ASA Babadag
Divizia C – County phase
25	1992–93	Șantierul Naval Tulcea
26	1993–94	ASA Babadag
27	1994–95	Delta Ferom Tulcea
28	1995–96	Săgeata Stejaru
Divizia D
29	1996–97	Săgeata Stejaru
30	1997–98	Șantierul Naval Tulcea
31	1998–99	Șantierul Naval Tulcea
32	1999–00	Voința Beștepe
33	2000–01	Dinamo Tulcea
34	2001–02	Dinamo Tulcea
35	2002–03	Dinamo Tulcea
36	2003–04	Dinamo Tulcea II
37	2004–05	Dinamo Coral Tulcea
38	2005–06	Razim Jurilovca

Ed.	Season	Winners
Liga IV
39	2006–07	Granitul Babadag
40	2007–08	Săgeata Stejaru
41	2008–09	Stăruința Baia
42	2009–10	Eolica Baia
43	2010–11	Eolica Baia
44	2011–12	Unirea Casimcea
45	2012–13	Unirea Casimcea
46	2013–14	Delta Dobrogea Tulcea
47	2014–15	Granitul Babadag
48	2015–16	Șoimii Topolog
49	2016–17	Pescărușul Sarichioi
50	2017–18	Pescărușul Sarichioi
51	2018–19	Pescărușul Sarichioi
52	2019–20	Pescărușul Sarichioi
–	2020–21	Not disputed (Note: Not disputed due to COVID-19 pandemic in Romania.)
53	2021–22	Viitorul Murighiol
54	2022–23	Hamangia Baia
55	2023–24	Pescărușul Sarichioi
56	2024–25	Pescărușul Sarichioi
57	2025–26	Pescărușul Sarichioi

== See also ==
=== Main Leagues ===
- Liga I
- Liga II
- Liga III
- Liga IV

=== County Leagues (Liga IV series) ===
North–East

- Liga IV Bacău
- Liga IV Botoșani
- Liga IV Iași
- Liga IV Neamț
- Liga IV Suceava
- Liga IV Vaslui

North–West

- Liga IV Bihor
- Liga IV Bistrița-Năsăud
- Liga IV Cluj
- Liga IV Maramureș
- Liga IV Satu Mare
- Liga IV Sălaj

Center

- Liga IV Alba
- Liga IV Brașov
- Liga IV Covasna
- Liga IV Harghita
- Liga IV Mureș
- Liga IV Sibiu

West

- Liga IV Arad
- Liga IV Caraș-Severin
- Liga IV Gorj
- Liga IV Hunedoara
- Liga IV Mehedinți
- Liga IV Timiș

South–West

- Liga IV Argeș
- Liga IV Dâmbovița
- Liga IV Dolj
- Liga IV Olt
- Liga IV Teleorman
- Liga IV Vâlcea

South

- Liga IV Bucharest
- Liga IV Călărași
- Liga IV Giurgiu
- Liga IV Ialomița
- Liga IV Ilfov
- Liga IV Prahova

South–East

- Liga IV Brăila
- Liga IV Buzău
- Liga IV Constanța
- Liga IV Galați
- Liga IV Tulcea
- Liga IV Vrancea
