= Liga IV Botoșani =

Fourth tier Romanian football league

- Founded: 1968
- Country: Romania
- Level on pyramid: 4
- Promotion to: Liga III
- Relegation to: Liga V Botoșani
- Domestic cup: Cupa României – County phase
- Current champions: Unirea Curtești (3rd title) (2025–26)
- Most championships: Unirea Săveni (8 titles)
- Website: frf-ajf.ro/botosani
- Current: 2025–26 Liga IV Botoșani

Liga IV Botoșani (known as Liga IV Givova for sponsorship reasons) is one of the regional football divisions of Liga IV, the fourth tier of the Romanian football league system, for clubs based in Botoșani County, and is organized by AJF Botoșani – Asociația Județeană de Fotbal (lit. 'County Football Association').

It is contested by a variable number of teams, depending on the number of teams relegated from Liga III, the number of teams promoted from Liga V Botoșani, and the teams that withdraw or enter the competition. The winner may or may not be promoted to Liga III, depending on the result of a promotion play-off contested against the winner of a neighboring county series.

== History ==
In 1968, following the new administrative and territorial reorganization of the country, each county established its own football championship, integrating teams from the former regional championships as well as those that had previously competed in town and rayon level competitions. The freshly formed Botoșani County Championship was placed under the authority of the newly created Consiliul Județean pentru Educație Fizică și Sport (lit. 'County Council for Physical Education and Sports') in Botoșani County.

Since then, the structure and organization of Botoșani’s main county competition, like those of other county championships, have undergone numerous changes. Between 1968 and 1992, it was known as Campionatul Județean (County Championship). In 1992, it was renamed Divizia C – Faza Județeană (Divizia C – County Phase), became Divizia D in 1997, and has been known as Liga IV since 2006. Beginning with the 2011–12 season, the competition was renamed Liga IV Givova after the county football association concluded a sponsorship agreement with the Italian sportswear brand.

== Promotion ==
The champions of each county association play against one another in a play-off to earn promotion to Liga III. Geographical criteria are taken into consideration when the play-offs are drawn. In total, there are 41 county champions plus the Bucharest municipal champion.

== List of Champions ==
=== Botoșani Regional Championship ===
Ed.	Season	Winners
1	1951	Flamura Roșie Botoșani
2	1952	Dinamo 3 Dorohoi

=== Botoșani County Championship ===
Ed.	Season	Winners
County Championship
1	1968–69	Volanul Botoșani
2	1969–70	Unirea Săveni
3	1970–71	Victoria PTTR Botoșani
4	1971–72	Unirea Săveni
5	1972–73	Constructorul Botoșani
6	1973–74	Unirea Săveni
7	1974–75	Unirea Săveni
8	1975–76	Metalul Botoșani
9	1976–77	Siretul Bucecea
10	1977–78	Unirea Săveni
11	1978–79	Electro Botoșani
12	1979–80	Unirea Săveni
13	1980–81	Unirea Săveni
14	1981–82	Sănătatea Darabani
15	1982–83	Unirea Săveni
16	1983–84	Luceafărul Botoșani
17	1984–85	Cristalul Dorohoi
18	1985–86	Metalul Botoșani
19	1986–87	ASSAI Botoșani
20	1987–88	Bucecea
21	1988–89	Electro Botoșani
22	1989–90	Cristalul Dorohoi
23	1990–91	Metalul Botoșani
24	1991–92	Agrojim Dângeni
Divizia C – County phase
25	1992–93	Cristalul Dorohoi
26	1993–94	Bucecea
27	1994–95	Progresul Bucecea
28	1995–96	Metalul Botoșani
29	1996–97	Metalul Botoșani
Divizia D
30	1997–98	Unirea Botoșani
31	1998–99	Siretul Bucecea
32	1999–00	Dorohoi
33	2000–01	Prodalcom Vorona
34	2001–02	Prodalcom Vorona
35	2002–03	Lacul Sulița
36	2003–04	ASA Ecologisul Botoșani
37	2004–05	Botoșani II
38	2005–06	Ecologistul Botoșani

Ed.	Season	Winners
Liga IV
39	2006–07	Avântul Albești
40	2007–08	Luceafărul Mihai Eminescu
41	2008–09	Roma
42	2009–10	Luceafărul Mihai Eminescu
43	2010–11	Botoșani II
44	2011–12	Microbuzul Botoșani
45	2012–13	Luceafărul Mihai Eminescu
46	2013–14	Luceafărul Mihai Eminescu
47	2014–15	Inter Dorohoi
48	2015–16	Luceafărul Mihai Eminescu
49	2016–17	Sănătatea Darabani
50	2017–18	Avântul Albești
51	2018–19	Viitorul Albești
52	2019–20	Dante Botoșani
–	2020–21	Not disputed (Note: Not disputed due to COVID-19 pandemic in Romania.)
53	2021–22	Sporting Darabani
54	2022–23	Unirea Curtești
55	2023–24	Prosport Vârfu Câmpului
56	2024–25	Unirea Curtești
57	2025–26	Unirea Curtești

== See also ==
=== Main Leagues ===
- Liga I
- Liga II
- Liga III
- Liga IV

=== County Leagues (Liga IV series) ===
North–East

- Liga IV Bacău
- Liga IV Botoșani
- Liga IV Iași
- Liga IV Neamț
- Liga IV Suceava
- Liga IV Vaslui

North–West

- Liga IV Bihor
- Liga IV Bistrița-Năsăud
- Liga IV Cluj
- Liga IV Maramureș
- Liga IV Satu Mare
- Liga IV Sălaj

Center

- Liga IV Alba
- Liga IV Brașov
- Liga IV Covasna
- Liga IV Harghita
- Liga IV Mureș
- Liga IV Sibiu

West

- Liga IV Arad
- Liga IV Caraș-Severin
- Liga IV Gorj
- Liga IV Hunedoara
- Liga IV Mehedinți
- Liga IV Timiș

South–West

- Liga IV Argeș
- Liga IV Dâmbovița
- Liga IV Dolj
- Liga IV Olt
- Liga IV Teleorman
- Liga IV Vâlcea

South

- Liga IV Bucharest
- Liga IV Călărași
- Liga IV Giurgiu
- Liga IV Ialomița
- Liga IV Ilfov
- Liga IV Prahova

South–East

- Liga IV Brăila
- Liga IV Buzău
- Liga IV Constanța
- Liga IV Galați
- Liga IV Tulcea
- Liga IV Vrancea
