= Liga IV Bistrița-Năsăud =

Fourth tier Romanian football league

- Founded: 1968
- Country: Romania
- Level on pyramid: 4
- Promotion to: Liga III
- Relegation to: Liga V Bistrița-Năsăud
- Domestic cup: Cupa României – County phase
- Current champions: Minerul Rodna (10th title) (2025–26)
- Most championships: Minerul Rodna (10 titles)
- Website: frf-ajf.ro/bistrita-nasaud
- Current: 2025–26 Liga IV Bistrița-Năsăud

Liga IV Bistrița-Năsăud is one of the regional football divisions of Liga IV, the fourth tier of the Romanian football league system, for clubs based in Bistrița-Năsăud County, and is organized by AJF Bistrița-Năsăud – Asociația Județeană de Fotbal (lit. 'County Football Association').

It is contested by a variable number of teams, depending on the number of teams relegated from Liga III, the number of teams promoted from Liga V Bistrița-Năsăud, and the teams that withdraw or enter the competition. The winner may or may not be promoted to Liga III, depending on the result of a promotion play-off contested against the winner of a neighboring county series.

== History ==
In 1968, following the new administrative and territorial reorganization of the country, each county established its own football championship, integrating teams from the former regional championships as well as those that had previously competed in town and rayon level competitions. The freshly formed Bistrița-Năsăud County Championship was placed under the authority of the newly created Consiliul Județean pentru Educație Fizică și Sport (lit. 'County Council for Physical Education and Sports') in Bistrița-Năsăud County.

Since then, the structure and organization of Bistrița-Năsăud’s main county competition, like those of other county championships, have undergone numerous changes. Between 1968 and 1992, it was known as Campionatul Județean (County Championship). In 1992, it was renamed Divizia C – Faza Județeană (Divizia C – County Phase), became Divizia D in 1997, and has been known as Liga IV since 2006.

== Promotion ==
The champions of each county association play against one another in a play-off to earn promotion to Liga III. Geographical criteria are taken into consideration when the play-offs are drawn. In total, there are 41 county champions plus the Bucharest municipal champion.

== List of champions ==
=== Rodna Regional Championship ===
Ed.	Season	Winners
1	1951	Progresul Bistrița
2	1952	Progresul Bistrița

=== Bistrița-Năsăud County Championship ===
Ed.	Season	Winners
County Championship
1	1968–69	Foresta Năsăud
2	1969–70	Someșul Beclean
3	1970–71	Minerul Rodna
4	1971–72	Foresta Susenii Bârgăului
5	1972–73	Minerul Rodna
6	1973–74	Progresul Năsăud
7	1974–75	Progresul Năsăud
8	1975–76	Constructorul Bistrița
9	1976–77	Hebe Sângeorz-Băi
10	1977–78	Silvicultorul Maieru
11	1978–79	Vișinul Șieu-Măgheruș
12	1979–80	Textila Năsăud
13	1980–81	Constructorul Beclean
14	1981–82	Sticla Bistrița
15	1982–83	Heniu Prundu Bârgăului
16	1983–84	Energia Prundu Bârgăului
17	1984–85	Laminorul Beclean
18	1985–86	Mecanica Bistrița
19	1986–87	Hebe Sângeorz-Băi
20	1987–88	Someșul Reteag
21	1988–89	Minerul Rodna
22	1989–90	Hebe Sângeorz-Băi
23	1990–91	Minerul Rodna
24	1991–92	Vișinul Șieu-Măgheruș
Divizia C – County phase
25	1992–93	Progresul Năsăud
26	1993–94	Victoria Bistrița
27	1994–95	Minerul Rodna
28	1995–96	Hârtia Prundu Bârgăului
29	1996–97	Hârtia Prundu Bârgăului
Divizia D
30	1997–98	Mecanica Bistrița
31	1998–99	Laminorul Beclean
32	1999–00	Voința Mărișelu
33	2000–01	Eciro Forest Telciu
34	2001–02	Minerul Rodna
35	2002–03	Viticola Dumitra
36	2003–04	Olimpia Șieuț
37	2004–05	Minerul Rodna
38	2005–06	Progresul Năsăud

Ed.	Season	Winners
Liga IV
39	2006–07	Voința Cetate
40	2007–08	Progresul Năsăud
41	2008–09	Voința Livezile
42	2009–10	Voința Mărișelu
43	2010–11	Voința Livezile
44	2011–12	Pro Someș Feldru
45	2012–13	Heniu Prundu Bârgăului
46	2013–14	Gloria Bistrița II
47	2014–15	Voința Cetate
48	2015–16	Bistrița
49	2016–17	Dumitra
50	2017–18	Dumitra
51	2018–19	Minerul Rodna
52	2019–20	Not awarded (Note: 2019–20 Liga IV Bistrița-Năsăud suspended in March 2020 because of the COVID-19 pandemic in Romania – season abandoned and no teams was declared champion.)
–	2020–21	Not disputed (Note: Not disputed due to COVID-19 pandemic in Romania.)
53	2021–22	Silvicultorul Maieru
54	2022–23	Minerul Rodna
55	2023–24	Silvicultorul Maieru
56	2024–25	Săgeata Dumbrăvița
57	2025–26	Minerul Rodna

== See also ==
=== Main Leagues ===
- Liga I
- Liga II
- Liga III
- Liga IV

=== County Leagues (Liga IV series) ===
North–East

- Liga IV Bacău
- Liga IV Botoșani
- Liga IV Iași
- Liga IV Neamț
- Liga IV Suceava
- Liga IV Vaslui

North–West

- Liga IV Bihor
- Liga IV Bistrița-Năsăud
- Liga IV Cluj
- Liga IV Maramureș
- Liga IV Satu Mare
- Liga IV Sălaj

Center

- Liga IV Alba
- Liga IV Brașov
- Liga IV Covasna
- Liga IV Harghita
- Liga IV Mureș
- Liga IV Sibiu

West

- Liga IV Arad
- Liga IV Caraș-Severin
- Liga IV Gorj
- Liga IV Hunedoara
- Liga IV Mehedinți
- Liga IV Timiș

South–West

- Liga IV Argeș
- Liga IV Dâmbovița
- Liga IV Dolj
- Liga IV Olt
- Liga IV Teleorman
- Liga IV Vâlcea

South

- Liga IV Bucharest
- Liga IV Călărași
- Liga IV Giurgiu
- Liga IV Ialomița
- Liga IV Ilfov
- Liga IV Prahova

South–East

- Liga IV Brăila
- Liga IV Buzău
- Liga IV Constanța
- Liga IV Galați
- Liga IV Tulcea
- Liga IV Vrancea
