= Liga IV Gorj =

Fourth tier Romanian football league

- Founded: 1968
- Country: Romania
- Level on pyramid: 4
- Promotion to: Liga III
- Relegation to: Liga V Gorj
- Domestic cup: Cupa României – County phase
- Current champions: Negomir (1st title) (2025–26)
- Most championships: Petrolul Țicleni and Gilortul Târgu Cărbunești (8 titles each)
- Website: frf-ajf.ro/gorj
- Current: 2025–26 Liga IV Gorj

Liga IV Gorj is one of the regional football divisions of Liga IV, the fourth tier of the Romanian football league system, for clubs based in Gorj County, and is organized by AJF Gorj – Asociația Județeană de Fotbal (lit. 'County Football Association').

It is contested by a variable number of teams, depending on the number of teams relegated from Liga III, the number of teams promoted from Liga V Gorj, and the teams that withdraw or enter the competition. The winner may or may not be promoted to Liga III, depending on the result of a promotion play-off contested against the winner of a neighboring county series.

== History ==
In 1968, following the new administrative and territorial reorganization of the country, each county established its own football championship, integrating teams from the former regional championships as well as those that had previously competed in town and rayon level competitions. The freshly formed Gorj County Championship was placed under the authority of the newly created Consiliul Județean pentru Educație Fizică și Sport (lit. 'County Council for Physical Education and Sports') in Gorj County.

Since then, the structure and organization of Liga IV Gorj, like those of other county championships, have undergone numerous changes. Between 1968 and 1992, the main county competition was known as the Campionatul Județean (County Championship). Between 1992 and 1997, it was renamed Divizia C – Faza Județeană (Divizia C – County Phase), followed by Divizia D starting in 1997, and since 2006, it has been known as Liga IV.

== List of champions ==
=== Gorj Regional Championship ===
Ed.	Season	Winners
1	1951	Progresul Târgu Jiu
2	1952	Locomotiva Turnu Severin

=== Gorj County Championship ===
Ed.	Season	Winners
County Championship
1	1968–69	Metalurgistul Sadu
2	1969–70	CIL Târgu Jiu
3	1970–71	Minerul Rovinari
4	1971–72	Gorjul Târgu Jiu
5	1972–73	Metalurgistul Sadu
6	1973–74	Minerul Leurda
7	1974–75	Petrolul Țicleni
8	1975–76	Petrolul Țicleni
9	1976–77	Constructorul Târgu Jiu
10	1977–78	Parângul Novaci
11	1978–79	Petrolul Țicleni
12	1979–80	Constructorul Târgu Jiu
13	1980–81	Parângul Novaci
14	1981–82	Petrolul Țicleni
15	1982–83	Constructorul Târgu Jiu
16	1983–84	Energia Rovinari
17	1984–85	Minerul Mătăsari
18	1985–86	Energia Rovinari
19	1986–87	Jiul ACH Târgu Jiu
20	1987–88	Petrolul Stoina
21	1988–89	Avântul Baia de Fier
22	1989–90	Minerul Rovinari
23	1990–91	Petrolul Târgu Cărbunești
24	1991–92	Metalurgistul Sadu
Divizia C – County phase
25	1992–93	Jiul Rovinari
26	1993–94	Petrolul Țicleni
27	1994–95	Minerul Bustuchin
28	1995–96	Minerul Urdari
29	1996–97	Minerul Urdari
Divizia D
30	1997–98	Gilortul Târgu Cărbunești
31	1998–99	Gilortul Târgu Cărbunești
32	1999–00	Arsenal Sadu
33	2000–01	Parângul Novaci
34	2001–02	Mecanica Motru
35	2002–03	Minerul Rovinari
36	2003–04	Arsenal Motru
37	2004–05	Gilortul Târgu Cărbunești
38	2005–06	Petrolul Țicleni

Ed.	Season	Winners
Liga IV
39	2006–07	Parângul Sadu
40	2007–08	Jiul Rovinari
41	2008–09	Ralbex Turcinești
42	2009–10	Petrolul Țicleni
43	2010–11	Ralbex Turcinești
44	2011–12	Petrofac Țicleni
45	2012–13	Știința Turceni
46	2013–14	Gilortul Târgu Cărbunești
47	2014–15	Gilortul Târgu Cărbunești
48	2015–16	Gilortul Târgu Cărbunești
49	2016–17	Internațional Bălești
50	2017–18	Petrolul Bustuchin
51	2018–19	Gilortul Târgu Cărbunești
52	2019–20	Știința Turceni
–	2020–21	Not disputed (Note: Not disputed due to COVID-19 pandemic in Romania.)
53	2021–22	Turceni
54	2022–23	Turceni
55	2023–24	Vulturii Fărcășești
56	2024–25	Târgu Jiu
57	2025–26	Negomir

== See also ==
=== Main Leagues ===
- Liga I
- Liga II
- Liga III
- Liga IV

=== County Leagues (Liga IV series) ===
North–East

- Liga IV Bacău
- Liga IV Botoșani
- Liga IV Iași
- Liga IV Neamț
- Liga IV Suceava
- Liga IV Vaslui

North–West

- Liga IV Bihor
- Liga IV Bistrița-Năsăud
- Liga IV Cluj
- Liga IV Maramureș
- Liga IV Satu Mare
- Liga IV Sălaj

Center

- Liga IV Alba
- Liga IV Brașov
- Liga IV Covasna
- Liga IV Harghita
- Liga IV Mureș
- Liga IV Sibiu

West

- Liga IV Arad
- Liga IV Caraș-Severin
- Liga IV Gorj
- Liga IV Hunedoara
- Liga IV Mehedinți
- Liga IV Timiș

South–West

- Liga IV Argeș
- Liga IV Dâmbovița
- Liga IV Dolj
- Liga IV Olt
- Liga IV Teleorman
- Liga IV Vâlcea

South

- Liga IV Bucharest
- Liga IV Călărași
- Liga IV Giurgiu
- Liga IV Ialomița
- Liga IV Ilfov
- Liga IV Prahova

South–East

- Liga IV Brăila
- Liga IV Buzău
- Liga IV Constanța
- Liga IV Galați
- Liga IV Tulcea
- Liga IV Vrancea
