= Liga IV =

Association football league in Romania

- Founded: 1936 / 2006 (current format)
- Country: Romania
- Level on pyramid: 4
- Promotion to: Liga III
- Relegation to: Liga V
- Domestic cup(s): Cupa României; Supercupa României
- Website: https://www.frf-ajf.ro/
- Current: 2026–27 Liga IV

Liga IV is the fourth level of the Romanian football league system and is run in all 41 counties and in the Municipality of Bucharest. It was known as the Regional Championship, County Championship, Divizia C – County Phase and Divizia D. Its name was changed into Liga IV before the start of the 2006–07 season.

== History ==
Football in Romania has its origins in 1909, when the country's first football competition was founded. In the beginning, matches were played in a cup-style system, with participating teams primarily coming from the Muntenia region, especially from Bucharest and Ploiești.

In the 1920–21 season, in addition to the Harwester Cup, the Jean Luca P. Niculescu Cup, and the Maior Zorileanu Cup in Bucharest, district championships were also held in Timișoara/Arad, Cluj, Oradea, Târgu Mureș, and Cernăuți. For unclear reasons, however, no national tournament was held between the district champions.

Starting with the 1921–22 season, the Football Association Commission decided to modify the competition's structure, introducing a new system: the winners of each district championship across the country would qualify for the national phase to determine the Romanian champion.

In 1930, the Football Association Commission officially became the Romanian Football Federation – Association, and football activities were reorganized. Thus, Romanian football was divided into five geographical leagues – North, West, South, East, and Center, each subdivided into districts. The district champions no longer advanced directly to the national phase, but instead participated in an elimination tournament to determine the champion of the regional league. The winning team would then earn the right to participate in the national phase's final tournament, where it would compete for the title of Romanian champion.

In 1932, with the establishment of Divizia A, regional leagues became the second football level, and the five regional champions participated, alongside the last-place teams from the two series of the top tier and the winner of the match between the 6th-place teams of the two series, in a promotion/relegation play-off for Divizia A.

In the 1934–35 season, with the establishment of Divizia B, the competition became the third football level. Later, in the 1936–37 season, with the establishment of Divizia C, the Regional Championship became the fourth level of Romanian football. After the 1937–38 season, Divizia C was disbanded, and the Regional Championship returned to its status as the third tier until the reintroduction of Divizia C in the post-war period.

In 1950, the Romanian People's Republic was reorganized administratively and territorially into regions and districts, with each region having its own football championship. Between 1950–1956 and 1960–1963, the Regional Championship served as the third tier of Romanian football, as Divizia C was disbanded during these two periods.

== Current format ==
The Liga IV comprises 42 divisions, one for each county and the municipality of Bucharest, organized regionally by their respective county or municipal football associations. Each association determines the number of participants and the competition format. The most common structure features a single division with home-and-away matches, though some associations opt for parallel divisions, culminating in a play-off to crown the champion.

== Promotion ==
The champions of each county association play one another in a play-off to determine 21 teams that will promote to Liga III. Geographical criteria are taken into consideration when the play-offs are drawn. In total there are 41 county champions plus the Bucharest municipal champion.

At this level, teams are not regarded as fully-fledged clubs but are instead classified as "sporting associations." However, teams aspiring to promotion must obtain a Certificate of Sports Identity (C.I.S.) from the Ministry of Youth and Sport, officially recognizing them as football clubs affiliated with the national federation.

== Series ==
Liga IV is divided in 42 series, one for each county. All county leagues are organized individually by every County Football Association (AJF), but under the supervision of the Romanian Football Federation.

North–East

- Liga IV Bacău
- Liga IV Botoșani
- Liga IV Iași
- Liga IV Neamț
- Liga IV Suceava
- Liga IV Vaslui

North–West

- Liga IV Bihor
- Liga IV Bistrița-Năsăud
- Liga IV Cluj
- Liga IV Maramureș
- Liga IV Satu Mare
- Liga IV Sălaj

Center

- Liga IV Alba
- Liga IV Brașov
- Liga IV Covasna
- Liga IV Harghita
- Liga IV Mureș
- Liga IV Sibiu

West

- Liga IV Arad
- Liga IV Caraș-Severin
- Liga IV Gorj
- Liga IV Hunedoara
- Liga IV Mehedinți
- Liga IV Timiș

South–West

- Liga IV Argeș
- Liga IV Dâmbovița
- Liga IV Dolj
- Liga IV Olt
- Liga IV Teleorman
- Liga IV Vâlcea

South

- Liga IV Bucharest
- Liga IV Călărași
- Liga IV Giurgiu
- Liga IV Ialomița
- Liga IV Ilfov
- Liga IV Prahova

South–East

- Liga IV Brăila
- Liga IV Buzău
- Liga IV Constanța
- Liga IV Galați
- Liga IV Tulcea
- Liga IV Vrancea

== Notable teams (2025–26) ==
Alba County

- Ocna Mureș

Arad County

- Național Sebiș
- Podgoria Pâncota

Bacău County

- Gauss Bacău
- Moinești

Bihor County

- CA Oradea
- Crișul Aleșd
- Olimpia Salonta
- Oșorhei
- Ștei

Brașov County

- Colțea Brașov
- Corona Brașov
- Făgăraș
- SR Brașov

Brăila County

- Făurei
- Viitorul Ianca

Bucharest Municipality

- Daco-Getica București

Caraș-Severin County

- Caransebeș

Călărași County

- Oltenița

Constanţa County

- Gloria Albești
- Năvodari
- Ovidiu
- Portul Constanța

Covasna County

- Păpăuți

Dâmbovița County

- Fieni

Dâmbovița County

- Cârcea

Gorj County

- Minerul Motru

Hunedoara County

- Aurul Brad
- CFR Simeria
- Deva
- Dacia Orăștie
- Minerul Uricani
- Vulcan

Ialomița County

- Fetești

Iași County

- Pașcani

Ilfov County

- Brănești
- Olimpic Snagov

Maramureș County

- Academica Recea
- Progresul Șomcuta Mare

Mehedinți County

- Victoria Vânju Mare

Mureș County

- Avântul Reghin

Neamț County

- Roman

Olt County

- Olt Scornicești

Prahova County

- Brazi
- Boldești-Scăeni

Satu Mare County

- Oașul Negrești-Oaș
- Victoria Carei

Sibiu County

- Voința Sibiu

Timiș County

- Lugoj
- Recaș
- Ripensia Timișoara
- Unirea Sânnicolau Mare

Vaslui County

- Hușana Huși

Vâlcea County

- Viitorul Horezu

Vrancea County

- Focșani
- Panciu

== See also ==
- Liga I
- Liga II
- Liga III
