= Liga IV Olt =

Fourth tier Romanian football league

- Founded: 1968
- Country: Romania
- Level on pyramid: 4
- Promotion to: Liga III
- Relegation to: Liga V Olt
- Domestic cup: Cupa României – County phase
- Current champions: Lupii Profa (2nd title) (2025–26)
- Most championships: Progresul Caracal (6 titles)
- Website: frf-ajf.ro/olt
- Current: 2025–26 Liga IV Olt

Liga IV Olt is one of the regional football divisions of Liga IV, the fourth tier of the Romanian football league system, for clubs based in Olt County, and is organized by AJF Olt – Asociația Județeană de Fotbal (lit. 'County Football Association').

It is contested by a variable number of teams, depending on the number of teams relegated from Liga III, the number of teams promoted from Liga V Olt, and the teams that withdraw or enter the competition. The winner may or may not be promoted to Liga III, depending on the result of a promotion play-off contested against the winner of a neighboring county series.

== History ==
In 1968, following the new administrative and territorial reorganization of the country, each county established its own football championship, integrating teams from the former regional championships as well as those that had previously competed in town and rayon level competitions. The freshly formed Olt County Championship was placed under the authority of the newly created Consiliul Județean pentru Educație Fizică și Sport (lit. 'County Council for Physical Education and Sports') in Olt County.

Since then, the structure and organization of Liga IV Olt, like those of other county championships, have undergone numerous changes. Between 1968 and 1992, the main county competition was known as the Campionatul Județean (County Championship). Between 1992 and 1997, it was renamed Divizia C – Faza Județeană (Divizia C – County Phase), followed by Divizia D starting in 1997, and since 2006, it has been known as Liga IV.

== Promotion ==
The champions of each county association play against one another in a play-off to earn promotion to Liga III. Geographical criteria are taken into consideration when the play-offs are drawn. In total, there are 41 county champions plus the Bucharest municipal champion. Coming after a strong regional championship, the first editions in Olt County were among the most successful, with most promotion play-offs being won.

== List of Champions ==
| Ed. | Season | Winners |
County Championship
| 1 | 1968–69 | CFR Caracal |
| 2 | 1969–70 | FC Caracal |
| 3 | 1970–71 | Rapid Piatra-Olt |
| 4 | 1971–72 | Recolta Stoicănești |
| 5 | 1972–73 | FOB Balș |
| 6 | 1973–74 | Viitorul Scornicești |
| 7 | 1974–75 | Voința Caracal |
| 8 | 1975–76 | Laminorul IPA Slatina |
| 9 | 1976–77 | Electrodul Slatina |
| 10 | 1977–78 | Răsăritul Caracal |
| 11 | 1978–79 | Electrodul Slatina |
| 12 | 1979–80 | Rapid Piatra-Olt |
| 13 | 1980–81 | Victoria Caracal |
| 14 | 1981–82 | IPC Slatina |
| 15 | 1982–83 | Știința Drăgănești-Olt |
| 16 | 1983–84 | IOB Balș |
| 17 | 1984–85 | Metalul Scornicești |
| 18 | 1985–86 | Rapid Piatra-Olt |
| 19 | 1986–87 | Sporting Slatina |
| 20 | 1987–88 | SM Drăgănești-Olt |
| 21 | 1988–89 | Spicul Coteana |
| 22 | 1989–90 | Electrodul Slatina |
| 23 | 1990–91 | Constructorul Slatina |
| 24 | 1991–92 | IOB Balș |
Divizia C – County phase
| 25 | 1992–93 | Constructorul Slatina |
| 26 | 1993–94 | SM Drăgănești-Olt |
| 27 | 1994–95 | Slatina |
| 28 | 1995–96 | Olt 90 Scornicești |
| 29 | 1996–97 | Alprom Slatina |
Divizia D
| 30 | 1997–98 | Progresul Caracal |
| 31 | 1998–99 | IOB Balș |
| 32 | 1999–00 | SM Drăgănești-Olt |
| 33 | 2000–01 | Progresul Caracal |
| 34 | 2001–02 | Progresul Caracal |
| 35 | 2002–03 | Olt 90 Scornicești |
| 36 | 2003–04 | Recolta Bâlteni |
| 37 | 2004–05 | Alprom Slatina |
| 38 | 2005–06 | Balș |

| Ed. | Season | Winners |
Liga IV
| 39 | 2006–07 | Oltul 2000 Drăgănești-Olt |
| 40 | 2007–08 | Știința Dăneasa |
| 41 | 2008–09 | Sportul Vișina Nouă |
| 42 | 2009–10 | CSM Slatina |
| 43 | 2010–11 | Recolta Stoicănești |
| 44 | 2011–12 | Viitorul Grădinile |
| 45 | 2012–13 | Balș |
| 46 | 2013–14 | Inter Markus Coteana |
| 47 | 2014–15 | Milcov |
| 48 | 2015–16 | Recolta Stoicănești |
| 49 | 2016–17 | Milcov |
| 50 | 2017–18 | Vedița Colonești |
| 51 | 2018–19 | CSM Slatina |
| 52 | 2019–20 | Petrolul Potcoava |
| – | 2020–21 | Not disputed (Note: Not disputed due to COVID-19 pandemic in Romania.) |
| 53 | 2021–22 | Oltul Curtișoara |
| 54 | 2022–23 | Oltul Curtișoara |
| 55 | 2023–24 | Iris Titulescu |
| 56 | 2024–25 | Lupii Profa |
| 57 | 2025–26 | Lupii Profa |

== See also ==
=== Main Leagues ===
- Liga I
- Liga II
- Liga III
- Liga IV

=== County Leagues (Liga IV series) ===
North–East

- Liga IV Bacău
- Liga IV Botoșani
- Liga IV Iași
- Liga IV Neamț
- Liga IV Suceava
- Liga IV Vaslui

North–West

- Liga IV Bihor
- Liga IV Bistrița-Năsăud
- Liga IV Cluj
- Liga IV Maramureș
- Liga IV Satu Mare
- Liga IV Sălaj

Center

- Liga IV Alba
- Liga IV Brașov
- Liga IV Covasna
- Liga IV Harghita
- Liga IV Mureș
- Liga IV Sibiu

West

- Liga IV Arad
- Liga IV Caraș-Severin
- Liga IV Gorj
- Liga IV Hunedoara
- Liga IV Mehedinți
- Liga IV Timiș

South–West

- Liga IV Argeș
- Liga IV Dâmbovița
- Liga IV Dolj
- Liga IV Olt
- Liga IV Teleorman
- Liga IV Vâlcea

South

- Liga IV Bucharest
- Liga IV Călărași
- Liga IV Giurgiu
- Liga IV Ialomița
- Liga IV Ilfov
- Liga IV Prahova

South–East

- Liga IV Brăila
- Liga IV Buzău
- Liga IV Constanța
- Liga IV Galați
- Liga IV Tulcea
- Liga IV Vrancea
