= Liga V =

Association football league in Romania

- Founded: 2006
- Country: Romania
- Level on pyramid: 5
- Promotion to: Liga IV
- Relegation to: Liga VI or none
- Domestic cup(s): Cupa României; Supercupa României
- Current: 2026–27 Liga V

Liga V is the fifth level of the Romanian football league system.

== Current format ==
Liga V has 42 divisions. The divisions are regionalised and are organised by every county association. Each team plays in their own county. The county associations decide how many teams play in the league and how many matches each side plays. In Romania the most frequently used system is one division with matches played home and away. A number of associations prefer 2 or even 3 parallel divisions. The number of teams differ from one county association to another.

== Promotion ==
The champions of each division are promoted to Liga IV.

== Series ==
Liga V is divided in 42 series, one for each county. All county leagues are organized individually by every County Football Association (AJF), but under the supervision of the Romanian Football Federation.

North–East

- Liga V Bacău
- Liga V Botoșani
- Liga V Iași
- Liga V Neamț
- Liga V Suceava
- Liga V Vaslui

North–West

- Liga V Bihor
- Liga V Bistrița-Năsăud
- Liga V Cluj
- Liga V Maramureș
- Liga V Satu Mare
- Liga V Sălaj

Center

- Liga V Alba
- Liga V Brașov
- Liga V Covasna
- Liga V Harghita
- Liga V Mureș
- Liga V Sibiu

West

- Liga V Arad
- Liga V Caraș-Severin
- Liga V Gorj
- Liga V Hunedoara
- Liga V Mehedinți
- Liga V Timiș

South–West

- Liga V Argeș
- Liga V Dâmbovița
- Liga V Dolj
- Liga V Olt
- Liga V Teleorman
- Liga V Vâlcea

South

- Liga V Bucharest
- Liga V Călărași
- Liga V Giurgiu
- Liga V Ialomița
- Liga V Ilfov
- Liga V Prahova

South–East

- Liga V Brăila
- Liga V Buzău
- Liga V Constanța
- Liga V Galați
- Liga V Tulcea
- Liga V Vrancea

== Notable teams (2024–25) ==
=== Liga V ===
Arad County

- Crișul Chișineu-Criș

Botoșani County

- Viitorul Darabani

Brașov County

- Colțea Brașov

Bucharest Municipality

- Venus București

Caraș-Severin Municipality

- Caransebeș

Cluj County

- Speranța Jucu

Constanța County

- Gloria Albești

Dolj County

- Avântul Bârca

Galați County

- Răzeșii Valea Mărului

Timiș County

- Becicherecu Mic
- Ripensia Timișoara

=== Liga VI ===
Arad County

- Șoimii Lipova
- Victoria Ineu

Timiș County

- CFR Timișoara

=== Not active at senior level ===
Bacău County

- CSO Buhuși

Bihor County

- Luceafărul Oradea

Caraș-Severin County

- Progresul Ezeriș

Ilfov County

- CS Balotești

Prahova County

- Prahova Ploiești

Sălaj County

- Silvania Șimleu Silvaniei

Sibiu County

- Măgura Cisnădie

Timiș County

- Electrica Timișoara

Tulcea County

- Delta Tulcea

== See also ==
- Liga I
- Liga II
- Liga III
- Liga IV
