= Ciocănești =

Ciocăneşti may refer to several places in Romania:

- Ciocănești, Călărași, a commune
- Ciocănești, Dâmbovița, a commune
- Ciocănești, Suceava, a commune
- Ciocăneşti, a village in Călineşti, Argeş
- Ciocăneşti, a village in Cozieni, Buzău County
- Ciocăneşti, a village in Dioști, Dolj County
- Ciocăneşti, a village in Bărăști, Olt County
