= 2024–25 Liga IV =

83rd season of Romanian football league

Liga IV
- Season: 2024–25

The 2024–25 Liga IV was the 83rd season of Liga IV and the 57th since the 1968 administrative and territorial reorganization of the country, representing the fourth tier of the Romanian football league system. The champions of each county association played against one from a neighbouring county in a play-off for promotion to Liga III.

The counties were divided into seven regions, each consisting of six counties, and the draw took place on 3 February 2025.

== County leagues ==
North–East

- Bacău (BC)
- Botoșani (BT)
- Iași (IS)
- Neamț (NT)
- Suceava (SV)
- Vaslui (VS)

North–West

- Bihor (BH)
- Bistrița-Năsăud (BN)
- Cluj (CJ)
- Maramureș (MM)
- Satu Mare (SM)
- Sălaj (SJ)

Center

- Alba (AB)
- Brașov (BV)
- Covasna (CV)
- Harghita (HR)
- Mureș (MS)
- Sibiu (SB)

West

- Arad (AR)
- Caraș-Severin (CS)
- Gorj (GJ)
- Hunedoara (HD)
- Mehedinți (MH)
- Timiș (TM)

South–West

- Argeș (AG)
- Dâmbovița (DB)
- Dolj (DJ)
- Olt (OT)
- Teleorman (TR)
- Vâlcea (VL)

South

- Bucharest (B)
- Călărași (CL)
- Giurgiu (GR)
- Ialomița (IL)
- Ilfov (IF)
- Prahova (PH)

South–East

- Brăila (BR)
- Buzău (BZ)
- Constanța (CT)
- Galați (GL)
- Tulcea (TL)
- Vrancea (VN)

== Promotion play-off ==
The matches were played on 22 and 29 June 2025.

Team 1	Agg.	Team 2	1st leg	2nd leg
Region 1 (North-East)				
Comstar Vaslui (VS)	w/o (Note: Unirea Curtești, Săgeata Dumbrăvița, and Stăruința Zagon do not meet the conditions for participation in the promotion play-off to Liga III.)	(BT) Unirea Curtești	w/o	w/o
Roman (NT)	2–5	(IS) Moldova Cristești	1–2	1–3
Cetatea Suceava (SV)	8–1	(BC) Bârsănești	6–0	2–1
Region 2 (North-West)				
Bihorul Beiuș (BH)	4–0	(CJ) Sticla Arieșul Turda	3–0	1–0
Chieșd (SJ)	4–14	(SM) Unirea Tășnad	2–5	2–9
Academica Recea (MM)	w/o	(BN) Săgeata Dumbrăvița	w/o	w/o
Region 3 (Center)				
Inter Sibiu (SB)	w/o (Note: Unirea Cristuru Secuiesc withdrew due to financial difficulties.)	(HR) Unirea Cristuru Secuiesc	w/o	w/o
ASA Târgu Mureș (MS)	1–8	(BV) Săcele	1–6	0–2
Hidro Mecanica Șugag 1984 (AB)	w/o	(CV) Stăruința Zagon	w/o	w/o
Region 4 (West)				
Viitorul Severin (MH)	2–6	(HD) Unirea DMO	1–4	1–2
Unirea Sântana (AR)	3–0	(CS) Nera Bogodinț	3–0	0–0
Lugoj (TM)	0–1	(GJ) Târgu Jiu	0–0	0–1
Region 5 (South-West)				
Voința Crevedia (DB)	4–1	(OT) Lupii Profa	3–1 (Note: The matches were played on 21 and 28 June 2025.)	1–0
Nanov (TR)	2–4	(VL) Păușești Otăsău	2–1	0–3
Cârcea (DJ)	2–3	(AG) Zimbrii Lerești	0–1	2–2
Region 6 (South)				
Știința București (B)	2–2 (2–4 p)	(PH) Teleajenul Vălenii de Munte	2–0	0–2
Rovine (IL)	2–14	(GR) AXI Adunații-Copăceni	2–6	0–8
Gloria Fundeni (CL)	1–11	(IF) Progresul Mogoșoaia	1–7	0–4
Region 7 (South-East)				
Agigea (CT)	1–0	(VN) Victoria Gugești	1–0	0–0
Carpați Nehoiu (BZ)	1–3	(BR) Victoria Traian	0–1	1–2
Voința Cudalbi (GL)	5–3	(TL) Pescărușul Sarichioi	3–2	2–1

== League standings ==
=== Alba County ===
Team changes from the previous season

- CIL Blaj achieved promotion to Liga III.
- Industria Galda was relegated from Liga III.
- FC Lopadea Nouă (15th place) was relegated to Liga V Alba.
- AFC Micești (Series II winners) was promoted from Liga V Alba.
- Orient Blandiana (Series I winners) declined promotion from Liga V Alba.
- Unirea Alba Iulia II withdrew.
- Viitorul Vama Seacă (14th place) was spared from relegation.
- Adu Academy Șona was renamed Academia Șona.

Pos	Team	Pld	W	D	L	GF	GA	GD	Pts	Qualification or relegation
1	Hidro Mecanica Șugag 1984 (C, Q)	28	22	3	3	89	30	+59	69	Qualification to promotion play-off
2	Viitorul Sântimbru	28	21	2	5	95	28	+67	65	
3	Ocna Mureș	28	21	2	5	96	43	+53	65	
4	Performanța Ighiu	28	19	3	6	78	42	+36	60	
5	Voința Stremț	28	17	6	5	70	38	+32	57	
6	Industria Galda	28	15	8	5	82	43	+39	53	
7	Inter Unirea	28	12	3	13	67	60	+7	39	
8	Spicul Daia Romană	28	11	4	13	47	47	0	37	
9	Fortuna Lunca Mureșului	28	9	5	14	49	67	−18	32	
10	Energia Săsciori	28	9	3	16	53	59	−6	30	
11	Viitorul Vama Seacă	28	9	3	16	45	57	−12	30	
12	Academia Șona	28	8	3	17	57	85	−28	27	
13	Micești	28	6	3	19	27	76	−49	21	
14	Zlatna (R)	28	6	1	21	43	87	−44	19	Relegation to Liga V Alba
15	Limbenii Limba (R)	28	0	1	27	21	157	−136	1	Relegation to Liga V Alba

Rules for classification: 1) Points; 2) Head-to-head points; 3) Head-to-head goal difference; 4) Head-to-head goals scored; 5) Head-to-head away goals scored; 6) Goal difference; 7) Goals scored.
(C) Champions; (Q) Qualified for the phase indicated; (R) Relegated

=== Arad County ===
Team changes from the previous season

- Viitorul Arad achieved promotion to Liga III.
- CS Socodor was relegated from Liga III.
- ACB Ineu II (15th place; withdrew) was relegated to Liga V Arad.
- Progresul Pecica II (Series A winners) was promoted from Liga V Arad.
- Frontiera Pilu (Series B winners) and Crișul Chișineu-Criș (Series C winners) declined promotion from Liga V Arad.
- Păulișana Păuliș withdrew.
- CS Glogovăț 2013 was renamed CS Vladimirescu.

Pos	Team	Pld	W	D	L	GF	GA	GD	Pts	Qualification or relegation
1	Unirea Sântana (C, Q)	24	22	2	0	82	9	+73	68	Qualification to promotion play-off
2	Podgoria Pâncota	24	16	7	1	62	25	+37	55	
3	Socodor	24	15	6	3	55	25	+30	51	
4	Victoria Felnac	24	15	5	4	56	18	+38	50	
5	Șoimii Șimand	24	12	5	7	44	31	+13	41	
6	Frontiera Curtici	24	8	8	8	42	38	+4	32	
7	Beliu	24	9	4	11	45	40	+5	31	
8	Național Sebiș	24	8	2	14	28	54	−26	26	
9	Athletico Vinga	24	4	11	9	31	37	−6	23	
10	Voința Macea	24	6	4	14	37	60	−23	22	
11	Vladimirescu	24	4	6	14	33	57	−24	18	
12	Progresul Pecica II	24	4	1	19	37	91	−54	13	
13	Victoria Nădlac	24	2	1	21	30	97	−67	7	
14	Victoria Zăbrani (Note: Victoria Zăbrani withdrew after 3 rounds and all its results were canceled.) (D)	0	0	0	0	0	0	0	0	Withdrew

Source: AJF Arad
Rules for classification: 1) Points; 2) Head-to-head points; 3) Head-to-head goal difference; 4) Head-to-head goals scored; 5) Head-to-head away goals scored; 6) Goal difference; 7) Goals scored.
(C) Champions; (D) Disqualified; (Q) Qualified for the phase indicated

=== Argeș County ===
Team changes from the previous season

- Speed Academy Pitești achieved promotion to Liga III.
- Petrolul Hârtiești (Series North winners), AS Ciofrângeni (Series Center winners) and ACS Miroși (Series South winners) declined promotion from Liga V Argeș.
- CS Mioveni II withdrew in the previous season.
- ACS Costești, ACS Poiana Lacului, Internațional Valea Iașului and Dacia Ștefănești withdrew.
- Speed Academy Pitești II and Young Boys Topoloveni were admitted upon request.

Pos	Team	Pld	W	D	L	GF	GA	GD	Pts	Qualification or relegation
1	Zimbrii Lerești (C, Q)	28	25	2	1	143	16	+127	77	Qualification to promotion play-off
2	Domnești	28	22	1	5	119	42	+77	67	
3	Young Boys Topoloveni	28	14	2	12	67	71	−4	44	
4	Pitești 2008	28	13	1	14	65	74	−9	40	
5	Suseni	28	12	1	15	56	64	−8	37	
6	Victoria Buzoești	28	10	4	14	63	75	−12	34	
7	DLR Pitești	28	7	2	19	69	106	−37	23	
8	Speed Academy Pitești II	28	2	1	25	26	160	−134	7	

Rules for classification: 1) Points; 2) Head-to-head points; 3) Head-to-head goal difference; 4) Head-to-head goals scored; 5) Head-to-head away goals scored; 6) Goal difference; 7) Goals scored.
(C) Champions; (Q) Qualified for the phase indicated

=== Bacău County ===
The Liga IV Bacău County was played with twenty-two teams, split into two series of twelve and ten teams in a double round-robin regular season, followed by a championship play-off between the top two teams from each series, played over six matches per team. Teams entered the play-off with all points and goal difference obtained against the top nine teams in their respective series. Only clubs with legal personality, holding a C.I.S. (Certificate of Sports Identity), and fielding at least one youth team were eligible to participate.

Team changes from the previous season

- Sportul Onești and Voința Cleja withdrew.
- Voința Bacău was admitted upon request.

Series I

Pos	Team	Pld	W	D	L	GF	GA	GD	Pts	Qualification or relegation
1	Negri	22	18	2	2	114	33	+81	56	Ineligible for promotion
2	Faraoani	22	16	1	5	62	40	+22	49	Ineligible for promotion
3	Moinești (Q)	22	15	3	4	79	27	+52	48	Qualification to championship play-off
4	Bubu (Q)	22	15	2	5	104	34	+70	47	Qualification to championship play-off
5	Siretu Săucești	22	12	4	6	62	37	+25	40	
6	Viitorul Nicolae Bălcescu	22	10	3	9	56	47	+9	33	
7	Bamirom Dumbrăveni	22	9	0	13	48	56	−8	27	
8	Voința Bacău	22	8	2	12	41	61	−20	26	
9	Gauss Bacău	22	7	2	13	41	103	−62	23	
10	Unirea Bacău	22	5	2	15	46	72	−26	17	
11	Flamura Roșie Sascut	22	4	2	16	36	68	−32	14	
12	Viitorul Dămienești	22	1	1	20	40	151	−111	4	

Rules for classification: 1) Points; 2) Head-to-head points; 3) Head-to-head goal difference; 4) Head-to-head goals scored; 5) Head-to-head away goals scored; 6) Goal difference; 7) Goals scored.
(Q) Qualified for the phase indicated

Series II

Pos	Team	Pld	W	D	L	GF	GA	GD	Pts	Qualification or relegation
1	Bârsănești (Q)	16	16	0	0	107	11	+96	48	Qualification to championship play-off
2	Vulturul Măgirești (Q)	16	12	0	4	67	43	+24	36	Qualification to championship play-off
3	Dofteana	16	11	1	4	51	29	+22	34	
4	Măgura Cașin	16	9	1	6	31	35	−4	28	
5	Gloria Zemeș	16	5	2	9	41	45	−4	17	
6	Bradul Mănăstirea Cașin	16	4	1	11	18	55	−37	13	
7	Voința Oituz	16	3	3	10	34	64	−30	12	
8	Măgura Târgu Ocna	16	4	0	12	23	70	−47	12	
9	Uzu Dărmănești	16	4	0	12	19	39	−20	12	
10	Viitorul Berești-Tazlău (Note: Viitorul Berești-Tazlău withdrew after 3 rounds and all its results were canceled.) (D)	0	0	0	0	0	0	0	0	Withdrew

Rules for classification: 1) Points; 2) Head-to-head points; 3) Head-to-head goal difference; 4) Head-to-head goals scored; 5) Head-to-head away goals scored; 6) Goal difference; 7) Goals scored.
(D) Disqualified; (Q) Qualified for the phase indicated
Notes:

Championship play-off

Pos	Team	Pld	W	D	L	GF	GA	GD	Pts	Qualification
1	Bârsănești (C, Q)	6	3	3	0	129	18	+111	60	Qualification to promotion play-off
2	Vulturul Măgirești	6	2	3	1	80	51	+29	45	
3	Bubu	6	2	0	4	79	50	+29	35	
4	Moinești	6	1	2	3	55	43	+12	35	

Rules for classification: 1) Points; 2) Head-to-head points; 3) Head-to-head goal difference; 4) Head-to-head goals scored; 5) Head-to-head away goals scored; 6) Goal difference; 7) Goals scored.
(C) Champions; (Q) Qualified for the phase indicated

=== Bihor County ===
Team changes from the previous season

- Diosig Bihardiószeg achieved promotion to Liga III.
- Viitorul Dobrești (8th place in Series II) and Slovan Valea Cerului (9th place in Series I) were relegated to Liga V Bihor.
- AS Olcea (winners) and CSC Hidișelu de Sus (runners-up) were promoted from Liga V Bihor.
- Vulturii Săcueni withdrew.
- Transilvania Sport Academy took the place of Unirea Roșia.
- Voința Cheresig (8th place in Series I) and Izvorul Cociuba Mare (9th place in Series II) were spared from relegation.

Pos	Team	Pld	W	D	L	GF	GA	GD	Pts	Qualification or relegation
1	Bihorul Beiuș (C, Q)	30	27	2	1	167	12	+155	83	Qualification to promotion play-off
2	CA Oradea	30	25	4	1	128	32	+96	79	
3	Oșorhei	30	23	1	6	105	27	+78	70	
4	Transilvania Sport Academy	30	19	2	9	100	49	+51	59	
5	Olimpia Salonta	30	18	3	9	77	41	+36	57	
6	Universitatea Oradea	30	17	3	10	109	68	+41	54	
7	Foresta Tileagd	30	16	3	11	85	59	+26	51	
8	Ștei	30	15	4	11	64	64	0	49	
9	Unirea Valea lui Mihai	30	15	1	14	89	61	+28	46	
10	Crișul Aleșd	30	11	3	16	53	75	−22	36	
11	Victoria Avram Iancu	30	10	2	18	68	105	−37	32	
12	Vadu Crișului	30	7	2	21	53	98	−45	23	
13	Voința Cheresig	30	6	4	20	47	100	−53	22	
14	Hidișelu de Sus	30	6	4	20	51	143	−92	22	
15	Izvorul Cociuba Mare (R)	30	3	4	23	31	131	−100	13	Relegation to Liga V Bihor
16	Olcea (R)	30	0	2	28	21	183	−162	2	Relegation to Liga V Bihor

Rules for classification: 1) Points; 2) Head-to-head points; 3) Head-to-head goal difference; 4) Head-to-head goals scored; 5) Head-to-head away goals scored; 6) Goal difference; 7) Goals scored.
(C) Champions; (Q) Qualified for the phase indicated; (R) Relegated

=== Bistrița-Năsăud County ===
Team changes from the previous season

- ACS Dumitra, CS Valea Bârgăului, Heniu Leșu, Viitorul Budești, Voința Matei, AS Archiud, Someșul Reteag, Sportul Beclean and Voința Mărișelu withdrew.
- Viticola Lechința was admitted upon request.
- Someșul Feldru was renamed Prosomeș Feldru.

Pos	Team	Pld	W	D	L	GF	GA	GD	Pts	Qualification
1	Săgeata Dumbrăvița (C, Q)	22	17	4	1	89	31	+58	55	Qualification to promotion play-off
2	Viitorul Livezile	22	17	2	3	84	23	+61	53	
3	Dinamo Uriu	22	16	1	5	76	31	+45	49	
4	Minerul Rodna	22	14	2	6	80	37	+43	44	
5	Progresul Năsăud	22	10	6	6	53	35	+18	36	
6	Silvicultorul Maieru	22	10	3	9	55	48	+7	33	
7	Atletico Monor	22	10	3	9	50	49	+1	33	
8	Hebe Sângeorz-Băi	22	6	3	13	31	46	−15	21	
9	Viticola Lechința	22	6	2	14	48	66	−18	20	
10	Eciro Forest Telciu	22	6	1	15	34	76	−42	19	
11	Prosomeș Feldru (R)	22	3	3	16	28	90	−62	12	Relegation to Liga V Bistrița-Năsăud
12	Real Teaca (R)	22	1	2	19	31	127	−96	5	Relegation to Liga V Bistrița-Năsăud

Rules for classification: 1) Points; 2) Head-to-head points; 3) Head-to-head goal difference; 4) Head-to-head goals scored; 5) Head-to-head away goals scored; 6) Goal difference; 7) Goals scored.
(C) Champions; (Q) Qualified for the phase indicated; (R) Relegated

=== Botoșani County ===
Team changes from the previous season

- Șoimii Bălușeni (12th place; withdrew) and Unirea Stăuceni (14th place; withdrew) were relegated to Liga V Botoșani.
- Nord Păltiniș (North Series winners) was promoted from Liga V Botoșani.
- Spartan Ripiceni (South Series winners) declined promotion from Liga V Botoșani.
- Viitorul Albești and Unirea Săveni withdrew.
- Zorile Havârna, Viitorul Gorbănești and Sportul Flămânzi were admitted upon request.
- Prosport Vârfu Câmpului was renamed Prosport Gloria Ultra.

Pos	Team	Pld	W	D	L	GF	GA	GD	Pts	Qualification or relegation
1	Unirea Curtești (C, Q)	26	22	3	1	84	27	+57	69	Qualification to promotion play-off
2	Partizanul Tudora	26	18	3	5	81	33	+48	57	
3	Inter Dorohoi	26	17	4	5	95	31	+64	55	
4	Bucecea	26	15	6	5	58	23	+35	51	
5	Nord Păltiniș	26	14	2	10	63	52	+11	44	
6	Sportivul Trușești	26	13	3	10	60	54	+6	42	
7	Sulița	26	13	2	11	90	65	+25	41	
8	Prosport Gloria Ultra	26	12	5	9	63	61	+2	41	
9	Viitorul Borzești	26	8	3	15	41	58	−17	27	
10	Epureni	26	8	3	15	47	77	−30	27	
11	Sportul Flămânzi	26	7	4	15	40	87	−47	25	
12	Voința Șendriceni	26	7	2	17	37	67	−30	23	
13	Viitorul Gorbănești (R)	26	5	1	20	53	96	−43	16	Relegation to Liga V Botoșani
14	Zorile Havârna (R)	26	1	3	22	31	112	−81	3 (Note: Zorile Havârna deducted 3 points.)	Relegation to Liga V Botoșani

Rules for classification: 1) Points; 2) Head-to-head points; 3) Head-to-head goal difference; 4) Head-to-head goals scored; 5) Head-to-head away goals scored; 6) Goal difference; 7) Goals scored.
(C) Champions; (Q) Qualified for the phase indicated; (R) Relegated

=== Brașov County ===
Team changes from the previous season

- CSM Codlea was invited to join Liga III.
- Teutonii Ghimbav (Brașov Zone winners) was promoted from Liga V Brașov.
- Clăbucet Nord Sebeș (Făgăraș Zone winners) declined promotion from Liga V Brașov.
- Colțea Brașov withdrew.
- Cetățenii Ghimbav withdrew during the previous season.
- FS Voila (14th place) and Carpați Berivoi (15th place) were spared from relegation.
- ACS Hălchiu and Corona Brașov were admitted upon request.

Pos	Team	Pld	W	D	L	GF	GA	GD	Pts	Qualification or relegation
1	Săcele (C, Q)	24	22	1	1	128	14	+114	67	Qualification to promotion play-off
2	Inter Cristian	24	18	4	2	83	22	+61	58	
3	Unirea Hărman	24	14	4	6	55	25	+30	46	
4	Aripile Brașov	24	12	5	7	63	39	+24	41	
5	Făgăraș	24	10	7	7	66	39	+27	37	
6	Teutonii Ghimbav	24	9	7	8	51	33	+18	34	
7	Chimia Victoria	24	9	6	9	48	51	−3	33	
8	Corona Brașov	24	9	4	11	47	40	+7	31	
9	Bucegi Moieciu	24	8	2	14	51	58	−7	26	
10	Hălchiu	24	7	2	15	51	78	−27	23	
11	Olimpic Zărnești II	24	5	6	13	40	77	−37	21	
12	Hoghiz	24	6	2	16	38	76	−38	20	
13	Carpați Berivoi	24	1	2	21	24	193	−169	5	
14	Voila (Note: Voila withdrew after 10 rounds and all its results were canceled.) (D)	0	0	0	0	0	0	0	0	Withdrew
15	Vulcan 2008 (Note: Vulcan 2008 withdrew after 13 rounds and all its results were canceled.) (D)	0	0	0	0	0	0	0	0	Withdrew

Rules for classification: 1) Points; 2) Head-to-head points; 3) Head-to-head goal difference; 4) Head-to-head goals scored; 5) Head-to-head away goals scored; 6) Goal difference; 7) Goals scored.
(C) Champions; (D) Disqualified; (Q) Qualified for the phase indicated

=== Brăila County ===
Team changes from the previous season

- Viitorul Cireșu achieved promotion to Liga III.
- FC Urleasca (Series I winners) and Voința Vișani (Series II winners) declined promotion from Liga V Brăila.
- Viitorul Însurăței (9th place) and CS Făurei (10th place) were spared from relegation.
- Luceafărul Brăila and Șoimii Tudor Vladimirescu were admitted upon request.
- Viitorul Ianca withdrew from Liga III and was enrolled upon request.

Pos	Team	Pld	W	D	L	GF	GA	GD	Pts	Qualification or relegation
1	Victoria Traian (C, Q)	22	21	1	0	96	12	+84	64	Qualification to promotion play-off
2	Viitorul Ianca	22	16	3	3	71	20	+51	51	
3	Cazasu	22	16	3	3	70	26	+44	51	
4	Sportul Chiscani	22	12	4	6	62	29	+33	40	
5	Daous Dava 2018 Brăila	22	12	2	8	60	34	+26	38	
6	Șoimii Tudor Vladimirescu	22	10	2	10	69	53	+16	32	
7	Viitorul Galbenu	22	8	6	8	52	48	+4	30	
8	Făurei	22	9	2	11	66	55	+11	29	
9	Suporter Club Brăila	22	6	2	14	38	57	−19	20	
10	Tricolorul Lanurile	22	6	1	15	44	71	−27	19	
11	Viitorul Însurăței (R)	22	2	0	20	25	172	−147	6	Relegation to Liga V Brăila
12	Luceafărul Brăila (R)	22	1	0	21	11	87	−76	3	Relegation to Liga V Brăila

Rules for classification: 1) Points; 2) Head-to-head points; 3) Head-to-head goal difference; 4) Head-to-head goals scored; 5) Head-to-head away goals scored; 6) Goal difference; 7) Goals scored.
(C) Champions; (Q) Qualified for the phase indicated; (R) Relegated

=== Bucharest ===
The Liga IV Bucharest will be played in a double round-robin format featuring twelve teams, followed by a championship play-off contested in a single round-robin format between the top four teams of the regular season. Based on their positions in the regular season, the teams will start the play-off with the following points: 1st place – 3 points, 2nd place – 2 points, 3rd place – 1 point, and 4th place – 0 points.

Team changes from the previous season

- Sportivii București (12th place; withdrew) was relegated to Liga V Bucharest
- Lions București (winners) declined promotion from Liga V Bucharest.
- Venus 1914 București withdrew.
- Rapid FNG București and Omega București were admitted upon request.
- ACS Alexandru Văidean (14th place) was spared from relegation.

Pos	Team	Pld	W	D	L	GF	GA	GD	Pts	Qualification or relegation
1	Știința București	22	20	1	1	113	8	+105	61	Qualification to championship play-off
2	Omega București	22	18	2	2	133	12	+121	56	Qualification to championship play-off
3	Daco-Getica București	22	17	1	4	99	21	+78	52	Qualification to championship play-off
4	Centrul German de Fotbal	22	15	2	5	117	17	+100	47	Qualification to championship play-off
5	Progresul 2005 București	22	15	2	5	97	37	+60	47	
6	Metaloglobus București II	22	12	1	9	51	37	+14	37	
7	Romprim București	22	9	0	13	43	66	−23	27	
8	Sportul D&A București	22	7	1	14	48	84	−36	22	
9	ACP 3 Kids Sport	22	5	1	16	58	75	−17	16	
10	Rapid FNG București	22	5	1	16	32	153	−121	16	
11	Alexandru Văidean (R)	22	2	0	20	18	161	−143	6	Relegation to Liga V Bucharest
12	NFC Arena (R)	22	1	0	21	18	156	−138	3	Relegation to Liga V Bucharest

Rules for classification: 1) Points; 2) Head-to-head points; 3) Head-to-head goal difference; 4) Head-to-head goals scored; 5) Head-to-head away goals scored; 6) Goal difference; 7) Goals scored.
(R) Relegated

Championship play-off

All matches were played at Romprim Stadium in Bucharest on 17, 24 and 31 May 2025.

Pos	Team	Pld	W	D	L	GF	GA	GD	Pts	Qualification
1	Știința București (C, Q)	3	3	0	0	6	1	+5	12	Qualification to promotion play-off
2	Omega București	3	2	0	1	8	2	+6	8	
3	Centrul German de Fotbal	3	1	0	2	3	6	−3	3	
4	Daco-Getica București	3	0	0	3	4	12	−8	1	

Rules for classification: 1) Points; 2) Head-to-head points; 3) Head-to-head goal difference; 4) Head-to-head goals scored; 5) Head-to-head away goals scored; 6) Goal difference; 7) Goals scored.
(C) Champions; (Q) Qualified for the phase indicated

=== Buzău County ===
Team changes from the previous season

- Luceafărul Maxenu (15th place) and Rapid Pârscov (16th place; withdrew) were relegated to Liga V Buzău.
- ASC Vernești (Series I winners and play-off winners), Diadema Gherăseni (Series II runners-up and play-off runners-up) and Recolta Smeeni (Series I runners-up and 3rd in play-off) were promoted from Liga V Buzău.
- Metalul Buzău II withdrew.
- Diadema Gheraseni was renamed Viitorul Gherăseni.

Pos	Team	Pld	W	D	L	GF	GA	GD	Pts	Qualification
1	Carpați Nehoiu	15	12	1	2	49	7	+42	37	Qualification to championship play-off
2	Team Săgeata	15	11	2	2	39	21	+18	35	Qualification to championship play-off
3	Montana Pătârlagele	15	10	2	3	27	19	+8	32	Qualification to championship play-off
4	Petrolul Berca	15	9	3	3	38	10	+28	30	Qualification to championship play-off
5	Gloria Vadu Pașii	15	9	3	3	37	13	+24	30	Qualification to championship play-off
6	Voința Lanurile	15	8	2	5	41	24	+17	26	Qualification to championship play-off
7	Știința Cernătești	15	7	4	4	40	29	+11	25	Qualification to championship play-off
8	Voința Balta Albă	15	7	4	4	32	23	+9	25	Qualification to championship play-off
9	Pescărușul Luciu	15	6	3	6	39	34	+5	21	Qualification to championship play-out
10	Recolta Sălcioara	15	6	0	9	30	34	−4	18	Qualification to championship play-out
11	Unirea Stâlpu	15	5	0	10	27	58	−31	15	Qualification to championship play-out
12	Viitorul Gherăseni	15	4	2	9	21	38	−17	14	Qualification to championship play-out
13	Șoimii Siriu	15	4	1	10	24	65	−41	13	Qualification to championship play-out
14	Progresul Beceni	15	3	1	11	17	30	−13	10	Qualification to championship play-out
15	Vernești	15	3	1	11	22	41	−19	7 (Note: Vernești deducted 3 points.)	Qualification to championship play-out
16	Recolta Smeeni	15	1	1	13	20	57	−37	4	Qualification to championship play-out

Rules for classification: 1) Points; 2) Head-to-head points; 3) Head-to-head goal difference; 4) Head-to-head goals scored; 5) Head-to-head away goals scored; 6) Goal difference; 7) Goals scored.
Notes:

Championship play-off

Pos	Team	Pld	W	D	L	GF	GA	GD	Pts	Qualification
1	Carpați Nehoiu (C, Q)	14	11	3	0	34	6	+28	73	Qualification to promotion play-off
2	Team Săgeata	14	8	1	5	31	27	+4	60	
3	Gloria Vadu Pașii	14	8	2	4	30	17	+13	56	
4	Montana Pătârlagele	14	7	2	5	19	22	−3	55	
5	Petrolul Berca	14	5	2	7	33	29	+4	47	
6	Voința Lanurile	14	5	4	5	37	24	+13	44 (Note: Voința Lanurile deducted 1 point.)	
7	Știința Cernătești	14	2	1	11	18	41	−23	32	
8	Voința Balta Albă	14	1	3	10	18	54	−36	31	

Rules for classification: 1) Points; 2) Head-to-head points; 3) Head-to-head goal difference; 4) Head-to-head goals scored; 5) Head-to-head away goals scored; 6) Goal difference; 7) Goals scored.
(C) Champions; (Q) Qualified for the phase indicated
Notes:

Championship play-out

Pos	Team	Pld	W	D	L	GF	GA	GD	Pts	Relegation
9	Viitorul Gherăseni	14	10	2	2	34	13	+21	46	
10	Pescărușul Luciu	14	8	1	5	37	21	+16	46	
11	Recolta Sălcioara	14	7	1	6	21	21	0	40	
12	Șoimii Siriu	14	7	0	7	26	41	−15	34	
13	Vernești	14	7	2	5	28	19	+9	30	
14	Unirea Stâlpu	14	4	0	10	25	37	−12	27	
15	Recolta Smeeni (R)	14	6	1	7	29	36	−7	23	Relegation to Liga V Buzău
16	Progresul Beceni (R)	14	3	1	10	24	36	−12	20	Relegation to Liga V Buzău

Rules for classification: 1) Points; 2) Head-to-head points; 3) Head-to-head goal difference; 4) Head-to-head goals scored; 5) Head-to-head away goals scored; 6) Goal difference; 7) Goals scored.
(R) Relegated

=== Caraș-Severin County ===
Team changes from the previous season

- Voința Vrani (winners) was promoted from Liga V Caraș-Severin.
- Voința Răcășdia (runners-up) declined promotion from Liga V Caraș-Severin.
- ACS Slatina-Timiș and Bistra Glimboca withdrew.
- CS Oțelu Roșu (13th place) and Mundo Reșița (14th place) were spared from relegation.
- CS Mehadia was admitted upon request.

Pos	Team	Pld	W	D	L	GF	GA	GD	Pts	Qualification or relegation
1	Nera Bogodinț (C, Q)	24	24	0	0	116	15	+101	72	Qualification to promotion play-off
2	Viitorul Armeniș	24	16	2	6	69	24	+45	50	
3	Voința Șoșdea	24	15	3	6	64	38	+26	48	
4	Moldova Nouă	24	13	2	9	84	34	+50	41	
5	Voința Vrani	24	12	3	9	76	59	+17	39	
6	Nera Bozovici	24	11	5	8	87	67	+20	38	
7	Narcisa Zervești	24	12	0	12	69	64	+5	36	
8	Anina	24	10	3	11	69	66	+3	33	
9	Oravița	24	9	4	11	50	55	−5	31	
10	Minerul Dognecea	24	9	3	12	70	55	+15	30	
11	Oțelu Roșu	24	7	1	16	40	145	−105	22	
12	Mehadia	24	4	0	20	20	126	−106	12	
13	Mundo Reșița (Note: Mundo Reșița withdrew after 14 rounds and lost all its second-half matches by 0–3.) (R)	24	0	0	24	14	86	−72	0	Relegation to Liga V Caraș-Severin
14	Magica Balta Caransebeș (Note: Magica Balta Caransebeș withdrew after 13 rounds, and all of its results were canceled.) (D)	0	0	0	0	0	0	0	0	Withdrew

Rules for classification: 1) Points; 2) Head-to-head points; 3) Head-to-head goal difference; 4) Head-to-head goals scored; 5) Head-to-head away goals scored; 6) Goal difference; 7) Goals scored.
(C) Champions; (D) Disqualified; (Q) Qualified for the phase indicated; (R) Relegated

=== Călărași County ===
Team changes from the previous season

- Viitorul Căscioarele (9th place in Series B) and Colinele Argeșului Mitreni (10th place in Series B) were relegated to Liga V Călărași.
- Borussia Dor Mărunt (Series A winners and play-off winners) and Phoenix Ulmu (Series B winners and play-off runners-up) declined promotion from Liga V Călărași.
- Venus Independența and Viitorul Ileana withdrew.
- AS Gâldău (9th place in Series A) and Conpet Ștefan cel Mare (10th place in Series A) were spared from relegation.
- Viitorul Dragoș Vodă and Dunărea Călărași II were admitted upon request.

West Series

Pos	Team	Pld	W	D	L	GF	GA	GD	Pts	Qualification
1	Viitorul Dragoș Vodă	14	10	2	2	36	14	+22	32	Qualification to championship play-off
2	Gloria Fundeni	14	11	1	2	36	15	+21	34	Qualification to championship play-off
3	Oltenița	14	7	2	5	28	16	+12	23	Qualification to championship play-off
4	Victoria Chirnogi	14	6	3	5	16	10	+6	21	Qualification to championship play-off
5	Victoria Lehliu	14	6	2	6	27	23	+4	20	Qualification to championship play-out
6	Unirea Mânăstirea	14	4	3	7	22	27	−5	15	Qualification to championship play-out
7	Steaua Radovanu	14	3	2	9	16	27	−11	11	Qualification to championship play-out
8	Viitorul Sărulești	14	1	1	12	8	57	−49	4	Qualification to championship play-out
9	Partizan Crivăț (Note: Partizan Crivăț withdrew after 3 rounds and all its results were canceled.) (D)	0	0	0	0	0	0	0	0	Withdrew

Rules for classification: 1) Points; 2) Head-to-head points; 3) Head-to-head goal difference; 4) Head-to-head goals scored; 5) Head-to-head away goals scored; 6) Goal difference; 7) Goals scored.
(D) Disqualified
Notes:

East Series

Pos	Team	Pld	W	D	L	GF	GA	GD	Pts	Qualification
1	Dunărea Ciocănești	16	13	1	2	75	14	+61	40	Qualification to championship play-off
2	Spicul Vâlcelele	16	15	0	1	77	9	+68	45	Qualification to championship play-off
3	Roseți	16	11	1	4	51	18	+33	34	Qualification to championship play-off
4	Dunărea Grădiștea	16	9	1	6	40	20	+20	28	Qualification to championship play-off
5	Zarea Cuza Vodă	16	8	1	7	30	34	−4	25	Qualification to championship play-out
6	Dunărea Călărași II	16	6	2	8	34	29	+5	20	Qualification to championship play-out
7	Gâldău	16	3	2	11	26	61	−35	11	Qualification to championship play-out
8	Unirea Dragalina	16	1	3	12	25	91	−66	6	Qualification to championship play-out
9	Conpet Ștefan cel Mare	16	0	1	15	12	94	−82	1	Qualification to championship play-out

Rules for classification: 1) Points; 2) Head-to-head points; 3) Head-to-head goal difference; 4) Head-to-head goals scored; 5) Head-to-head away goals scored; 6) Goal difference; 7) Goals scored.

Championship play-off
West Series

Pos	Team	Pld	W	D	L	GF	GA	GD	Pts	Qualification
1	Gloria Fundeni (Q)	6	4	0	2	7	5	+2	29	Qualification to championship final
2	Victoria Chirnogi	6	5	0	1	12	4	+8	27	
3	Viitorul Dragoș Vodă	6	2	1	3	6	8	−2	23	
4	Oltenița	6	0	1	5	4	12	−8	13	

Rules for classification: 1) Points; 2) Head-to-head points; 3) Head-to-head goal difference; 4) Head-to-head goals scored; 5) Head-to-head away goals scored; 6) Goal difference; 7) Goals scored.
(Q) Qualified for the phase indicated

East Series

Pos	Team	Pld	W	D	L	GF	GA	GD	Pts	Qualification
1	Spicul Vâlcelele (Q)	6	5	0	1	21	7	+14	38	Qualification to championship final
2	Dunărea Ciocănești	6	4	0	2	15	7	+8	32	
3	Roseți	6	2	0	4	7	14	−7	23	
4	Dunărea Grădiștea	6	1	0	5	8	23	−15	17	

Rules for classification: 1) Points; 2) Head-to-head points; 3) Head-to-head goal difference; 4) Head-to-head goals scored; 5) Head-to-head away goals scored; 6) Goal difference; 7) Goals scored.
(Q) Qualified for the phase indicated

Championship play-out
West Series

Pos	Team	Pld	W	D	L	GF	GA	GD	Pts	Relegation
5	Victoria Lehliu	5	4	1	0	27	4	+23	23	
6	Unirea Mânăstirea	5	3	1	1	15	11	+4	18	
7	Steaua Radovanu	6	2	2	2	15	8	+7	14	
8	Viitorul Sărulești	6	0	0	6	6	40	−34	2	Possible Relegation to Liga V Călărași
9	Partizan Crivăț	0	0	0	0	0	0	0	0	Withdrew

Updated to match(es) played on 31 May 2025. Source:
Rules for classification: 1) Points; 2) Head-to-head points; 3) Head-to-head goal difference; 4) Head-to-head goals scored; 5) Head-to-head away goals scored; 6) Goal difference; 7) Goals scored.

East Series

Pos	Team	Pld	W	D	L	GF	GA	GD	Pts	Relegation
5	Zarea Cuza Vodă	8	8	0	0	44	5	+39	37	
6	Dunărea Călărași II	8	4	1	3	25	13	+12	23	
7	Gâldău	8	3	1	4	12	25	−13	16	
8	Unirea Dragalina	8	4	0	4	22	28	−6	15	Possible Relegation to Liga V Călărași
9	Conpet Ștefan cel Mare	8	0	0	8	10	42	−32	1	Relegation to Liga V Călărași

Rules for classification: 1) Points; 2) Head-to-head points; 3) Head-to-head goal difference; 4) Head-to-head goals scored; 5) Head-to-head away goals scored; 6) Goal difference; 7) Goals scored.

Championship final

The match was played on 14 June 2025 at Comunal Stadium in Ciocănești.

Team 1	Score	Team 2
Spicul Vâlcelele	1–3	Gloria Fundeni

Gloria Fundeni won the Liga IV Călărași County and qualified for the promotion play-off in Liga III.

=== Cluj County ===
The Liga IV Cluj County was played in a double round-robin format with ten teams, followed by a championship play-off for the top four teams, contested in a double round-robin format, and a play-out for the bottom six teams, contested in a single round-robin format, with teams starting with all points accumulated in the regular season and no other records carried over.

Team changes from the previous season

- Vulturul Mintiu Gherlii achieved promotion to Liga III.
- Avântul Bizonii Recea-Cristur (Gherla Zone winners) was promoted from Liga V Cluj.
- Uniți Sub Tricolor Cornești (Câmpia Turzii Zone winners), Viitorul Poieni (Cluj Zone winners), Energia Mănăstirea (Dej Zone winners) and Meteor Mociu (Mociu Zone winners) declined promotion from Liga V Cluj.
- Speranța Jucu and Minerul Ocna Dej II withdrew during the previous the season.
- Viitorul Gârbău and ACS Iara withdrew.
- ȘF Dan Matei Cluj-Napoca and Academia Florești were admitted upon request.

Pos	Team	Pld	W	D	L	GF	GA	GD	Pts	Qualification or relegation
1	Avântul Bizonii Recea-Cristur	18	15	1	2	61	22	+39	46	Qualification to championship play-off
2	Sticla Arieșul Turda	18	15	0	3	61	21	+40	45	Qualification to championship play-off
3	Victoria Viișoara	18	14	2	2	91	18	+73	44	Qualification to championship play-off
4	Arieșul Mihai Viteazu	18	12	1	5	54	32	+22	37	Qualification to championship play-off
5	Dan Matei Cluj-Napoca	18	8	0	10	32	58	−26	24	Qualification to championship play-out
6	Atletic Olimpia Gherla	18	6	1	11	39	40	−1	19	Qualification to championship play-out
7	Unirea Iclod	18	6	0	12	44	51	−7	18	Qualification to championship play-out
8	Sănătatea Cluj II	18	5	0	13	31	57	−26	15	Qualification to championship play-out
9	Juniorul Cluj	18	4	1	13	35	83	−48	13	Qualification to championship play-out
10	Academia Florești	18	2	0	16	23	89	−66	6	Qualification to championship play-out

Rules for classification: 1) Points; 2) Head-to-head points; 3) Head-to-head goal difference; 4) Head-to-head goals scored; 5) Head-to-head away goals scored; 6) Goal difference; 7) Goals scored.

Championship play-off

Pos	Team	Pld	W	D	L	GF	GA	GD	Pts	Qualification
1	Sticla Arieșul Turda (C, Q)	6	3	2	1	12	9	+3	56	Qualification to promotion play-off
2	Victoria Viișoara	6	3	2	1	15	10	+5	55	
3	Avântul Bizonii Recea-Cristur	6	3	0	3	19	17	+2	55	
4	Arieșul Mihai Viteazu	6	1	0	5	10	20	−10	40	

Rules for classification: 1) Points; 2) Head-to-head points in the play-off; 3) Goal difference in the play-off; 4) Regular season ranking.
(C) Champions; (Q) Qualified for the phase indicated

Championship play-out

Pos	Team	Pld	W	D	L	GF	GA	GD	Pts
5	Unirea Iclod	5	5	0	0	19	3	+16	33
6	Dan Matei Cluj-Napoca	5	2	2	1	16	15	+1	32
7	Atletic Olimpia Gherla	5	2	1	2	18	13	+5	26
8	Sănătatea Cluj II	5	1	0	4	17	15	+2	18
9	Academia Florești	5	2	2	1	11	13	−2	14
10	Juniorul Cluj	5	0	1	4	9	31	−22	14

Rules for classification: 1) Points; 2) Head-to-head points in the play-out; 3) Goal difference in the play-out; 4) Regular season ranking.

=== Constanța County ===
Team changes from the previous season

- CS Medgidia achieved promotion to Liga III.
- Viitorul Pecineaga (17th place) was relegated to Liga V Constanța.
- Aurora 23 August (South Series winners) was promoted from Liga V Constanța.
- CS Peștera (North Series winners) and Gloria Băneasa II (West Series winners) declined promotion from Liga V Constanța.
- Danubius Rasova withdrew.
- Farul Tuzla (16th place) and CS Eforie (18th place) were spared from relegation.
- Constructorul Topraisar was admitted upon request.

Pos	Team	Pld	W	D	L	GF	GA	GD	Pts	Qualification or relegation
1	Agigea (C, Q)	32	26	2	4	128	34	+94	80	Qualification to promotion play-off
2	Portul Constanța	32	21	7	4	100	31	+69	70	
3	Poseidon Limanu	32	21	5	6	124	37	+87	68	
4	Sparta Techirghiol	32	21	5	6	121	50	+71	68	
5	Victoria Cumpăna	32	20	5	7	102	40	+62	65	
6	Năvodari	32	20	3	9	108	46	+62	63	
7	Aurora 23 August	32	18	6	8	80	43	+37	60	
8	Lumina	32	16	3	13	86	60	+26	51	
9	Murfatlar	32	16	3	13	63	53	+10	51	
10	Viitorul Cobadin	32	13	5	14	49	77	−28	44	
11	Ovidiu	32	13	3	16	81	86	−5	42	
12	Constructorul Topraisar	32	12	3	17	83	108	−25	39	
13	Viitorul Hârșova	32	10	1	21	50	64	−14	31	
14	Știința ACALAB Poarta Albă	32	7	1	24	41	123	−82	22	
15	Eforie	32	5	2	25	35	110	−75	17	
16	Mihail Kogălniceanu (R)	32	4	2	26	31	203	−172	14	Relegation to Liga V Constanța
17	Farul Tuzla (R)	32	0	2	30	11	128	−117	2	Relegation to Liga V Constanța

Rules for classification: 1) Points; 2) Head-to-head points; 3) Head-to-head goal difference; 4) Head-to-head goals scored; 5) Head-to-head away goals scored; 6) Goal difference; 7) Goals scored.
(C) Champions; (Q) Qualified for the phase indicated; (R) Relegated

=== Covasna County ===
Team changes from the previous season

- AS Covasna was renamed Carpați Covasna.

Pos	Team	Pld	W	D	L	GF	GA	GD	Pts	Qualification or relegation
1	Stăruința Zagon (C, Q)	28	24	1	3	105	21	+84	73	Qualification to promotion play-off
2	Baraolt	28	24	0	4	151	27	+124	72	
3	Carpați Covasna	28	23	1	4	140	31	+109	70	
4	Prima Brăduț	28	21	1	6	125	32	+93	64	
5	Arcuș	28	17	2	9	94	45	+49	53	
6	Perkö Sânzieni	28	17	2	9	77	38	+39	53	
7	Progresul Sita Buzăului	28	15	3	10	84	48	+36	48	
8	Păpăuți	28	11	1	16	58	86	−28	34	
9	Moacșa	28	11	3	14	57	88	−31	36	
10	Harghita Aita Mare	28	9	3	16	47	80	−33	30	
11	Cernat	28	8	3	17	42	103	−61	27	
12	Catalina	27	7	1	19	37	107	−70	22	
13	Nemere Ghelința	27	3	3	21	22	108	−86	12	
14	Venus Ozun	28	3	2	23	21	134	−113	11	
15	Ciucaș Întorsura Buzăului	28	2	2	24	30	142	−112	8	

Updated to match(es) played on 14 June 2025. Source:
Rules for classification: 1) Points; 2) Head-to-head points; 3) Head-to-head goal difference; 4) Head-to-head goals scored; 5) Head-to-head away goals scored; 6) Goal difference; 7) Goals scored.
(C) Champions; (Q) Qualified for the phase indicated

=== Dâmbovița County ===
Team changes from the previous season

- Urban Titu achieved promotion to Liga III.
- Viitorul Ocnița (16th place) was relegated to Liga V Dâmbovița.
- Viitorul Aninoasa (North Series winners), Viitorul Cojasca (South Series winners) and FC Lungulețu (South Series runners-up and promotion/relegation play-off winners) were promoted from Liga V Dâmbovița.
- ACS Burduca, Străjerii Răzvad, Bradul Moroeni and Unirea Bucșani withdrew.
- Voința Tătărani (15th place and promotion/relegation play-off losers) was spared from relegation.
- ACS Dragomirești and Voința Crevedia were admitted upon request.

Pos	Team	Pld	W	D	L	GF	GA	GD	Pts	Qualification or relegation
1	Voința Crevedia (C, Q)	28	25	2	1	101	12	+89	77	Qualification to promotion play-off
2	Recolta Gura Șuții	28	17	4	7	96	45	+51	55	
3	Viitorul Voinești	28	17	4	7	80	38	+42	55	
4	Libertatea Urziceanca	28	16	6	6	76	41	+35	54	
5	Viitorul Cojasca	28	16	3	9	83	56	+27	48 (Note: Viitorul Cojasca deducted 3 points.)	
6	Voința Tătărani	28	13	5	10	71	45	+26	44	
7	Viitorul Aninoasa	28	12	8	8	71	59	+12	44	
8	Săgeata Braniștea	28	11	3	14	79	69	+10	36	
9	Roberto Ziduri	28	12	3	13	63	91	−28	36 (Note: Roberto Ziduri deducted 3 points.)	
10	Fieni	28	10	5	13	76	78	−2	32 (Note: Fieni deducted 3 points.)	
11	1976 Potlogi	28	9	5	14	61	77	−16	32	
12	1948 Brezoaele	28	7	3	18	54	89	−35	24	
13	Flacăra Șuța Seacă (O)	28	6	3	19	47	96	−49	21	Qualification to relegation play-out
14	Lungulețu (R)	28	7	0	21	55	139	−84	21	Qualification to relegation play-out
15	Dragomirești (R)	28	3	4	21	42	120	−78	13	Relegation to Liga V Dâmbovița

Rules for classification: 1) Points; 2) Head-to-head points; 3) Head-to-head goal difference; 4) Head-to-head goals scored; 5) Head-to-head away goals scored; 6) Goal difference; 7) Goals scored.
(C) Champions; (O) Play-off winners; (Q) Qualified for the phase indicated; (R) Relegated
Notes:

Relegation play-out

The 13th and 14th-placed teams of the Liga IV faces the 2nd-placed teams of the two series of Liga V Dâmbovița – County.

Team 1	Score	Team 2
Flacăra Șuța Seacă	5–5 (a.e.t.) (5–4 p)	Raciu
Voința Crețu	10–1	Lungulețu

=== Dolj County ===
Team changes from the previous season

- Tineretul Poiana Mare (16th place) was relegated to Liga V Dolj.
- Avântul Giubega (Series I winners), Progresul Amărăștii de Sus (Series II winners), Știința Malu Mare (Series III winners) and CS Sopot (Series IV winners) declined promotion from Liga V Dolj.
- Viitorul Știința Craiova and Tractorul Cetate withdrew.
- Flacăra Moțăței (15th place) was spared from relegation.
- ACS Leamna was admitted upon request.

Pos	Team	Pld	W	D	L	GF	GA	GD	Pts	Qualification or relegation (Note: After 24 matches, the best four teams qualify for the series championship play-off, which was played in a double round-robin format.)
1	Cârcea (C, Q)	30	22	4	4	122	35	+87	70	Qualification for promotion play-off
2	RFG Melinești	30	22	2	6	126	40	+86	68	
3	Metropolitan Ișalnița	30	21	5	4	93	36	+57	68	
4	Știința Cerăt	30	14	2	14	53	65	−12	44	
5	Avântul Pielești	24	12	6	6	96	30	+66	42	
6	Progresul Băilești	24	12	2	10	55	45	+10	38	
7	Unirea Amărăștii de Jos	24	10	7	7	45	35	+10	37	
8	Unirea Tricolor Dăbuleni	24	10	2	12	55	56	−1	32	
9	Știința Danubius Bechet	24	8	4	12	41	54	−13	28	
10	Știința Celaru	24	8	3	13	71	66	+5	27	
11	Flacăra Moțăței	24	6	1	17	48	66	−18	19	
12	Progresul Segarcea	24	3	2	19	32	107	−75	11	
13	Leamna (R)	24	0	0	24	14	216	−202	0	Relegation to Liga V Dolj
14	Dunărea Calafat (Note: Dunărea Calafat withdrew after 6 rounds and all its results were canceled.) (D)	0	0	0	0	0	0	0	0	Withdrew

Rules for classification: 1) Points; 2) Head-to-head points; 3) Head-to-head goal difference; 4) Head-to-head goals scored; 5) Head-to-head away goals scored; 6) Goal difference; 7) Goals scored.
(C) Champions; (D) Disqualified; (Q) Qualified for the phase indicated; (R) Relegated

=== Galați County ===
Team changes from the previous season

- ACS Vânători (winners) declined promotion from Liga V Galați.
- Șoimii Foltești withdrew.
- Muncitorul Ghidigeni was renamed CS Ghidigeni.

Pos	Team	Pld	W	D	L	GF	GA	GD	Pts	Qualification or relegation
1	Voința Cudalbi (C, Q)	22	17	0	5	79	32	+47	51	Qualification to promotion play-off
2	Covurluiul 2021 Târgu Bujor	22	15	3	4	52	22	+30	48	
3	Gloria Ivești	22	14	4	4	57	18	+39	46	
4	Victoria Independența	22	12	4	6	59	37	+22	40	
5	Viitorul Umbrărești	22	10	4	8	44	38	+6	34	
6	Siretul Cosmești	22	10	2	10	38	43	−5	32	
7	Alegria JS Matca	22	9	3	10	40	50	−10	30	
8	Agrostar Tulucești	22	8	2	12	42	67	−25	26	
9	Progresul Munteni	22	7	3	12	41	51	−10	24	
10	Ghidigeni	22	5	3	14	35	51	−16	18	
11	Avântul Drăgănești	22	5	2	15	35	67	−32	17	
12	Lascăr Schela	22	4	2	16	20	66	−46	14	

Rules for classification: 1) Points; 2) Head-to-head points; 3) Head-to-head goal difference; 4) Head-to-head goals scored; 5) Head-to-head away goals scored; 6) Goal difference; 7) Goals scored.
(C) Champions; (Q) Qualified for the phase indicated

=== Gorj County ===
Team changes from the previous season

- CSO Turceni was relegated from Liga III.
- Vulturii Fărcășești achieved promotion to Liga III.
- 7 Noiembrie Costești (Series II winners) was promoted from Liga V Gorj.
- Triumful Borăscu (Series I winners) declined promotion from Liga V Gorj.
- Știința Drăguțești, Vulturii Fărcășești II and CSM Târgu Jiu were admitted upon request.

Pos	Team	Pld	W	D	L	GF	GA	GD	Pts	Qualification
1	Târgu Jiu (C, Q)	34	34	0	0	185	11	+174	102	Qualification to promotion play-off
2	Negomir	34	25	3	6	87	34	+53	78	
3	Tismana	34	22	6	6	85	41	+44	72	
4	Internațional Bălești	34	20	7	7	94	49	+45	67	
5	Turceni	34	19	3	12	93	47	+46	60	
6	Unirea Țânțăreni	34	18	6	10	78	45	+33	60	
7	Gilortul Târgu Cărbunești II	34	17	4	13	93	86	+7	55	
8	Vulturii Fărcășești II	34	17	2	15	85	71	+14	53	
9	Petrolul Bustuchin	34	15	5	14	69	64	+5	50	
10	Petrolul Țicleni	34	16	4	14	72	63	+9	49 (Note: Petrolul Țicleni deducted 3 points.)	
11	Minerul Motru	34	13	8	13	55	44	+11	47	
12	Jiul Rovinari	34	14	5	15	61	71	−10	47	
13	Minerul Mătăsari	34	11	7	16	45	62	−17	40	
14	Petrolul Stoina	34	12	3	19	68	98	−30	39	
15	Parângul Bumbești-Jiu	34	9	3	22	45	92	−47	30	
16	Jupânești	34	4	2	28	36	171	−135	14	
17	Știința Drăguțești (Note: Știința Drăguțești withdrew after 26 rounds and lost all their remaining matches by 0–3.)	33	3	2	28	30	100	−70	11	
18	7 Noiembrie Costești (Note: 7 Noiembrie Costești withdrew after 17 rounds and lost all their second-half matches by 0–3.)	33	1	0	32	14	146	−132	3	

Rules for classification: 1) Points; 2) Head-to-head points; 3) Head-to-head goal difference; 4) Head-to-head goals scored; 5) Head-to-head away goals scored; 6) Goal difference; 7) Goals scored.
(C) Champions; (Q) Qualified for the phase indicated

=== Giurgiu County ===
The Liga IV Giurgiu County was played in two stages, with a regular season split into two series of twelve teams each, followed by a championship play-off and play-out. The play-off will feature the top four teams from each series in a double round-robin format, with teams starting from 3, 2, 1, and 0 points based on their final ranking in the regular season. The play-out will include the teams ranked 5th to 12th in each series, also in a double round-robin format, with teams remaining within their respective series and starting with all points accumulated in the regular season. The bottom two teams from each series will be relegated to Liga V – Giurgiu County.

Team changes from the previous season

- Viitorul Vedea (South Series 11th place), VLD Șoimii Ghizdaru (South Series 12th place; withdrew), Petrolul Roata de Jos (North Series 11th place) and Omerta Stoenești (North Series 12th place; withdrew) relegated from Liga V Giurgiu.
- Viitorul Băneasa (South Series winners), Unirea Slobozia (South Series runners-up), Speranța Săbăreni (North Series winners) and Progresul Palanca (North Series runners-up) were promoted from Liga V Giurgiu.
- Inter Valea Dragului withdrew and was replaced by CS Mihai Bravu.

South Series

Pos	Team	Pld	W	D	L	GF	GA	GD	Pts	Qualification or relegation
1	Mihai Bravu	11	10	1	0	51	7	+44	31	Qualification to championship play-off
2	AXI Adunații-Copăceni	11	9	1	1	61	7	+54	28	Qualification to championship play-off
3	Victoria Adunații-Copăceni	11	8	1	2	51	9	+42	25	Qualification to championship play-off
4	Dunărea Găujani	11	8	1	2	53	12	+41	25	Qualification to championship play-off
5	Energia Remuș	11	5	0	6	29	26	+3	15	Qualification to championship play-out
6	MV Călugăreni	11	5	0	6	26	25	+1	15	Qualification to championship play-out
7	Gloria Comana	11	4	3	4	26	28	−2	15	Qualification to championship play-out
8	Viitorul Băneasa	11	4	0	7	23	43	−20	12	Qualification to championship play-out
9	Dunărea Oinacu	11	3	1	7	17	34	−17	10	Qualification to championship play-out
10	Unirea Slobozia	11	2	2	7	23	41	−18	8	Qualification to championship play-out
11	Real Colibași	11	2	2	7	15	38	−23	8	Qualification to championship play-out
12	Giganții Vărăști	11	0	0	11	12	117	−105	0	Qualification to championship play-out

Rules for classification: 1) Points; 2) Head-to-head points; 3) Head-to-head goal difference; 4) Head-to-head goals scored; 5) Head-to-head away goals scored; 6) Goal difference; 7) Goals scored.

North Series

Pos	Team	Pld	W	D	L	GF	GA	GD	Pts	Qualification or relegation
1	Bolintin Malu Spart	10	9	1	0	67	9	+58	28	Qualification to championship play-off
2	Speranța Săbăreni	10	7	1	2	36	19	+17	22	Qualification to championship play-off
3	Tântava	10	7	1	2	37	17	+20	22	Qualification to championship play-off
4	Zmeii Ogrezeni	10	6	0	4	28	37	−9	18	Qualification to championship play-off
5	Luceafărul Trestieni	10	6	0	4	28	23	+5	18	Qualification to championship play-out
6	Avântul Florești	10	4	0	6	19	18	+1	12	Qualification to championship play-out
7	Maxima Hobaia	10	3	3	4	24	32	−8	12	Qualification to championship play-out
8	Progresul Palanca	10	3	1	6	17	34	−17	10	Qualification to championship play-out
9	Silver Inter Zorile	10	2	1	7	13	36	−23	7	Qualification to championship play-out
10	Bolintin-Deal	10	1	2	7	23	37	−14	5	Qualification to championship play-out
11	Podu Doamnei	10	1	2	7	14	44	−30	5	Qualification to championship play-out
12	Singureni (Note: Singureni withdrew before the start of the season.) (D)	0	0	0	0	0	0	0	0	Withdrew

Rules for classification: 1) Points; 2) Head-to-head points; 3) Head-to-head goal difference; 4) Head-to-head goals scored; 5) Head-to-head away goals scored; 6) Goal difference; 7) Goals scored.
(D) Disqualified
Notes:

Championship play-off

Pos	Team	Pld	W	D	L	GF	GA	GD	Pts	Qualification
1	AXI Adunații-Copăceni (C, Q)	14	12	0	2	58	8	+50	38	Qualification to promotion play-off
2	Bolintin Malu Spart	14	8	2	4	31	27	+4	29	
3	Dunărea Găujani	14	8	3	3	33	15	+18	27	
4	Victoria Adunații-Copăceni	14	8	2	4	38	30	+8	27	
5	Mihai Bravu	14	5	2	7	25	27	−2	20	
6	Tântava	14	5	2	7	22	28	−6	18	
7	Speranța Săbăreni	14	1	2	11	21	55	−34	7	
8	Zmeii Ogrezeni	14	2	1	11	14	52	−38	7	

Rules for classification: 1) Points; 2) Head-to-head points; 3) Head-to-head goal difference; 4) Head-to-head goals scored; 5) Head-to-head away goals scored; 6) Goal difference; 7) Goals scored.
(C) Champions; (Q) Qualified for the phase indicated

Championship play-out
South Series

Pos	Team	Pld	W	D	L	GF	GA	GD	Pts	Relegation
5	MV Călugărenii	14	10	4	0	39	10	+29	49	
6	Gloria Comana	14	8	3	3	36	25	+11	42	
7	Dunărea Oinacu	14	7	3	4	31	37	−6	34	
8	Unirea Slobozia	14	8	1	5	43	28	+15	33	
9	Energia Remuș	14	4	2	8	31	32	−1	29	
10	Giganții Vărăști	14	8	3	3	40	21	+19	27	
11	Viitorul Băneasa (R)	14	1	1	12	23	55	−32	16	Relegation to Liga V Giurgiu
12	Real Colibași (R)	14	1	1	12	14	49	−35	12	Relegation to Liga V Giurgiu

Rules for classification: 1) Points; 2) Head-to-head points; 3) Head-to-head goal difference; 4) Head-to-head goals scored; 5) Head-to-head away goals scored; 6) Goal difference; 7) Goals scored.
(R) Relegated

North Series

Pos	Team	Pld	W	D	L	GF	GA	GD	Pts	Relegation
5	Avântul Florești	12	9	1	2	46	16	+30	40	
6	Luceafărul Trestieni	12	6	3	3	33	27	+6	39	
7	Progresul Palanca	12	5	3	4	27	31	−4	28	
8	Silver Inter Zorile	12	5	2	5	29	31	−2	24	
9	Maxima Hobaia	12	3	2	7	20	36	−16	23	
10	Podu Doamnei	12	4	1	7	28	32	−4	18	
11	Bolintin-Deal (R)	12	3	2	7	26	36	−10	16	Relegation to Liga V Giurgiu
12	Singureni (Note: Singureni withdrew before the start of the season.) (D)	0	0	0	0	0	0	0	0	Withdrew

Rules for classification: 1) Points; 2) Head-to-head points; 3) Head-to-head goal difference; 4) Head-to-head goals scored; 5) Head-to-head away goals scored; 6) Goal difference; 7) Goals scored.
(D) Disqualified; (R) Relegated

=== Harghita County ===
The Liga IV Harghita County was played in a double round-robin regular season, followed by a championship play-off and play-out. The play-off was contested between the top five teams, while the play-out was contested between the bottom six teams, both in a single round-robin format, each starting with half of their regular season points, rounded up, with no other records carried over.

Team changes from the previous season

- CS Gheorgheni achieved promotion to Liga III.
- Unirea Lueta (Odorhei Zone winners) and Ghimeș-Făget Lunca de Jos (Ciuc Zone winners) declined promotion from Liga V Harghita.
- Homorod Merești withdrew.
- Bastya Lăzarea and Pro Mureșul Toplița were admitted upon request.

Pos	Team	Pld	W	D	L	GF	GA	GD	Pts	Qualification or relegation
1	Sânsimion	20	14	1	5	41	21	+20	43	Qualification to championship play-off
2	Unirea Cristuru Secuiesc	20	13	2	5	64	39	+25	38 (Note: Unirea Cristuru Secuiesc deducted 3 points.)	Qualification to championship play-off
3	Agyagfalvi Lendület Lutița	20	12	2	6	48	29	+19	38	Qualification to championship play-off
4	Golimpiakosz Odorheiu Secuiesc	20	12	1	7	51	34	+17	37	Qualification to championship play-off
5	Roseal Odorheiu Secuiesc	20	10	3	7	44	30	+14	33	Qualification to championship play-off
6	Bradul Zetea	20	10	1	9	32	30	+2	31	Qualification to championship play-out
7	Minerul Bălan	20	9	0	11	41	40	+1	27	Qualification to championship play-out
8	Pro Mureșul Toplița	20	7	2	11	35	50	−15	23	Qualification to championship play-out
9	Metalul Vlăhița	20	5	2	13	22	43	−21	17	Qualification to championship play-out
10	Bastya Lăzarea	20	5	1	14	22	51	−29	16	Qualification to championship play-out
11	Ezüstfenyő Ciceu	20	5	1	14	30	63	−33	16	Qualification to championship play-out

Rules for classification: 1) Points; 2) Head-to-head points; 3) Head-to-head goal difference; 4) Head-to-head goals scored; 5) Head-to-head away goals scored; 6) Goal difference; 7) Goals scored.
Notes:

Championship play-off

Pos	Team	Pld	W	D	L	GF	GA	GD	Pts	Qualification
1	Unirea Cristuru Secuiesc (C, Q)	4	3	0	1	15	6	+9	28 (Note: Unirea Cristuru Secuiesc are ahead of Sânsimion and Golimpiakosz Odorheiu Secuiesc due to unrounded points carried over from the regular season.)	Qualification to promotion play-off
2	Sânsimion (Note: Sânsimion are ahead of Golimpiakosz Odorheiu Secuiesc on head-to-head points in the play-off.)	4	2	0	2	10	8	+2	28	
3	Golimpiakosz Odorheiu Secuiesc	4	3	0	1	8	4	+4	28	
4	Agyagfalvi Lendület Lutița	4	1	0	3	7	14	−7	22	
5	Roseal Odorheiu Secuiesc	4	1	0	3	3	11	−8	20	

Rules for classification: 1) Points; 2) Points without rounding; 3) Head-to-head points in the play-off; 4) Goal difference in the play-off; 5) Regular season ranking.
(C) Champions; (Q) Qualified for the phase indicated
Notes:

Championship play-out

Pos	Team	Pld	W	D	L	GF	GA	GD	Pts	Relegation
6	Minerul Bălan	5	3	1	1	18	9	+9	24 (Note: Minerul Bălan are ahead of Bradul Zetea on goal difference in the play-out.)	
7	Bradul Zetea	5	2	2	1	13	10	+3	24	
8	Pro Mureșul Toplița	5	2	1	2	11	12	−1	19	
9	Metalul Vlăhița	5	2	1	2	11	12	−1	16	
10	Ezüstfenyő Ciceu	5	2	0	3	6	12	−6	14	
11	Bastya Lăzarea	5	1	1	3	7	11	−4	12	Relegation to Liga V Harghita

Rules for classification: 1) Points; 2) Points without rounding; 3) Head-to-head points in the play-out; 4) Goal difference in the play-out; 5) Regular season ranking.

=== Hunedoara County ===
The Liga IV Hunedoara County was played in a double round-robin regular season, followed by a Final Four stage for the top teams and a play-out for the remaining teams. The Final Four stage was contested in a double round-robin format, while the play-out was contested in a single round-robin format, with each team starting both stages with half of their regular season points, rounded up, with no other records carried over.

Team changes from the previous season

- Minerul Lupeni was invited to join Liga III.
- Unirea DMO (winners) was promoted from Liga V Hunedoara.
- CSC Sântămăria-Orlea withdrew.
- CFR Simeria was admitted upon request.
- CSM Deva withdrew from Liga III and replaced its second team, CSM Deva II.

Pos	Team	Pld	W	D	L	GF	GA	GD	Pts	Qualification
1	Unirea DMO	22	19	1	2	116	30	+86	58	Qualification to final four
2	Gloria Geoagiu	22	19	1	2	88	21	+67	58	Qualification to final four
3	Aurul Brad	22	13	3	6	56	32	+24	42	Qualification to final four
4	Retezatul Hațeg	22	11	6	5	50	25	+25	39	Qualification to final four
5	Dacia Orăștie	22	10	8	4	51	32	+19	38	Qualification to championship play-out
6	CFR Simeria	22	11	4	7	30	35	−5	37	Qualification to championship play-out
7	Mihai Viteazu Vulcan	22	11	0	11	52	41	+11	33	Qualification to championship play-out
8	Inter Petrila	22	7	6	9	50	48	+2	27	Qualification to championship play-out
9	Șoimul Băița	22	5	3	14	44	60	−16	18	Qualification to championship play-out
10	Victoria Călan	22	4	3	15	25	66	−41	15	Qualification to championship play-out
11	Deva	22	4	0	18	27	87	−60	12	Qualification to championship play-out
12	Minerul Uricani	22	0	1	21	10	122	−112	1	Qualification to championship play-out

Rules for classification: 1) Points; 2) Head-to-head points; 3) Head-to-head goal difference; 4) Head-to-head goals scored; 5) Head-to-head away goals scored; 6) Goal difference; 7) Goals scored.

Championship play-off
Final four

Pos	Team	Pld	W	D	L	GF	GA	GD	Pts	Qualification
1	Unirea DMO (C, Q)	6	5	0	1	20	9	+11	44	Qualification to promotion play-off
2	Gloria Geoagiu	6	2	0	4	15	14	+1	35	
3	Aurul Brad	6	3	1	2	13	10	+3	31	
4	Retezatul Hațeg	6	1	1	4	6	21	−15	24	

Rules for classification: 1) Points; 2) Points without rounding; 3) Head-to-head points in the play-off; 4) Goal difference in the play-off; 5) Regular season ranking.
(C) Champions; (Q) Qualified for the phase indicated

Championship play-out

Pos	Team	Pld	W	D	L	GF	GA	GD	Pts
5	Dacia Orăștie	7	6	0	1	19	12	+7	37
6	Inter Petrila	7	6	0	1	29	10	+19	32
7	CFR Simeria	7	3	1	3	13	12	+1	29
8	Șoimul Băița	7	4	1	2	16	14	+2	22
9	Mihai Viteazu Vulcan	7	1	0	6	9	18	−9	20
10	Victoria Călan	7	3	1	3	11	16	−5	18
11	Deva	7	2	3	2	22	8	+14	15
12	Minerul Uricani	7	0	0	7	10	39	−29	1

Rules for classification: 1) Points; 2) Points without rounding; 3) Head-to-head points in the play-out; 4) Goal difference in the play-out; 5) Regular season ranking.

=== Ialomița County ===
Team changes from the previous season

- CSM Fetești achieved promotion to Liga III.
- Victoria Roșiori (17th place), Albești 08 (19th place) and Unirea Ion Roată (20th place) were relegated to Liga V Ialomița.
- Unirea Mihail Kogălniceanu (Series I winners) and FC Dridu (Series III winners) were promoted from Liga V Ialomița.
- Recolta Gheorghe Doja II (Series II winners) declined promotion from Liga V Ialomița.
- Junior Țăndărei and CS Amara withdrew.
- Viitorul Făcăeni and Bărăganul Ciulnița were admitted upon request.
- Unirea Scânteia spared from relegation.
- Unirea Mihail Kogălniceanu was renamed Flacăra Mihail Kogălniceanu.

Pos	Team	Pld	W	D	L	GF	GA	GD	Pts	Qualification
1	Rovine (C, Q)	34	29	4	1	160	40	+120	91	Qualification to promotion play-off
2	Înfrățirea Jilavele	34	25	6	3	137	35	+102	81	
3	Viitorul Făcăeni	34	22	2	10	106	58	+48	68	
4	Bărăganul Ciulnița	34	20	6	8	94	53	+41	66	
5	Victoria Munteni-Buzău	34	18	4	12	76	58	+18	58	
6	Dridu	34	18	2	14	79	64	+15	56	
7	Abatorul Slobozia	34	17	4	13	101	74	+27	55	
8	Recolta Bărcănești	34	16	7	11	83	67	+16	55	
9	Urziceni	34	15	8	11	61	44	+17	53	
10	Real Cosâmbești	34	16	5	13	68	72	−4	53	
11	Unirea Grivița	34	14	8	12	77	86	−9	50	
12	Victoria Țăndărei	34	12	10	12	51	62	−11	46	
13	Iazu (R)	34	13	6	15	71	82	−11	45	Relegation to Liga V Ialomița
14	Axintele (R)	34	11	4	19	63	84	−21	37	Relegation to Liga V Ialomița
15	Stăruința Broșteni (R)	34	8	7	19	58	100	−42	31	Relegation to Liga V Ialomița
16	Flacăra Mihail Kogălniceanu (R)	34	6	2	26	43	113	−70	20	Relegation to Liga V Ialomița
17	Unirea Scânteia (R)	34	3	0	31	45	173	−128	9	Relegation to Liga V Ialomița
18	Secunda Adâncata (Note: Secunda Adâncata withdrew after the first half of the season and lost all their second-half matches by 0–3.) (R)	34	0	1	33	12	120	−108	1	Relegation to Liga V Ialomița

Rules for classification: 1) Points; 2) Head-to-head points; 3) Head-to-head goal difference; 4) Head-to-head goals scored; 5) Head-to-head away goals scored; 6) Goal difference; 7) Goals scored.
(C) Champions; (Q) Qualified for the phase indicated; (R) Relegated

=== Iași County ===
Team changes from the previous season

- USV Iași achieved promotion to Liga III.
- Stejarul Sinești (15th place, withdrew) and Unirea Alexandru Ioan Cuza (16th place) were relegated to Liga V Iași.
- Voința Voinești (Seria I winners) and Progresul Deleni (Seria II winners) were promoted from Liga V Iași.
- Tonmir Iași and Stejarul Dobrovăț withdrew.
- CS Tomești, Viitorul Hărmănești and Gloria Românești were admitted upon request.

Pos	Team	Pld	W	D	L	GF	GA	GD	Pts	Qualification or relegation
1	Moldova Cristești (C, Q)	30	27	1	2	145	22	+123	82	Qualification to promotion play-off
2	Pașcani	30	25	4	1	166	25	+141	79	
3	Com-Val Valea Lupului	30	23	1	6	136	58	+78	70	
4	Victoria Lețcani	30	20	4	6	112	48	+64	64	
5	Țuțora	30	20	4	6	98	58	+40	64	
6	Unirea Ruginoasa	30	16	4	10	66	48	+18	52	
7	Stejarul Bârnova	30	15	2	13	59	64	−5	47	
8	Voința Voinești	30	14	2	14	72	79	−7	44	
9	Gloria Bălțați	30	13	2	15	93	62	+31	41	
10	Tomești	30	11	1	18	76	112	−36	34	
11	Viitorul Hârlau	30	9	4	17	40	74	−34	31	
12	Unirea Scânteia	30	8	3	19	45	116	−71	27	
13	Zimbru Boureni	30	7	4	19	49	107	−58	25	
14	Progresul Deleni	30	6	1	23	46	108	−62	19	
15	Gloria Românești (R)	30	5	3	22	50	115	−65	18	Relegation to Liga V Iași
16	Viitorul Hărmănești (R)	30	1	0	29	35	192	−157	3	Relegation to Liga V Iași

Rules for classification: 1) Points; 2) Head-to-head points; 3) Head-to-head goal difference; 4) Head-to-head goals scored; 5) Head-to-head away goals scored; 6) Goal difference; 7) Goals scored.
(C) Champions; (Q) Qualified for the phase indicated; (R) Relegated

=== Ilfov County ===
Team changes from the previous season

- CSL Ștefănești was invited to join Liga III.
- Viitorul Pantelimon (15th place) was relegated to Liga V Ilfov.
- Progresul Mogoșoaia (winners) and CSO Bragadiru (runners-up) were promoted from Liga V Ilfov.
- LPS HD Clinceni II and Voința Buftea withdrew.
- FC 1 Decembrie was spared from relegation.
- Viitorul Corbeanca was admitted upon request.

Pos	Team	Pld	W	D	L	GF	GA	GD	Pts	Qualification or relegation
1	Progresul Mogoșoaia	25	23	1	1	142	18	+124	70	Qualification to championship play-off
2	Glina	25	19	2	4	81	41	+40	59	Qualification to championship play-off
3	Olimpic Snagov	25	17	2	6	73	40	+33	53	Qualification to championship play-off
4	Bragadiru	25	14	8	3	70	35	+35	50	Qualification to championship play-off
5	Juniors Berceni	24	13	4	7	62	42	+20	43	
6	Viitorul Corbeanca	25	10	6	9	51	59	−8	36	
7	Ciorogârla	25	10	4	11	61	59	+2	34	
8	Voința Domnești	25	9	3	13	54	72	−18	30	
9	Viitorul Dragomirești-Vale	24	9	1	14	49	74	−25	28	
10	Stejarul Gruiu	25	8	2	15	46	59	−13	26	
11	Măgurele	24	6	4	14	44	62	−18	22	
12	Brănești	24	6	0	18	43	89	−46	18	
13	Viitorul Vidra	25	3	0	22	42	112	−70	9	
14	1 Decembrie (Note: 1 Decembrie withdrew after 13 rounds.) (D)	13	1	1	11	16	72	−56	4	Withdrew

Rules for classification: 1) Points; 2) Head-to-head points; 3) Head-to-head goal difference; 4) Head-to-head goals scored; 5) Head-to-head away goals scored; 6) Goal difference; 7) Goals scored.
(D) Disqualified
Notes:

Championship play-off
Semi-finals

The matches were played on 7 June 2025 for the first leg, and on 10 and 11 June 2025 for the second leg.

Team 1	Agg.	Team 2	1st leg	2nd leg
Glina	4–3	Olimpic Snagov	2–2	2–1
Bragadiru	3–11	Progresul Mogoșoaia	2–3	1–8

Final

The match was played on 14 June 2025 at the Comunal Stadium in 1 Decembrie.

Team 1	Score	Team 2
Glina	1–3	Progresul Mogoșoaia

Progresul Mogoșoaia won the Liga IV Ilfov and qualified for the promotion play-off in Liga III.

=== Maramureș County ===
- Gloria Tăuții-Măgherăuș withdrew.
- Cristalul Cavnic was admitted upon request.
- Viitorul Culcea-Săcălășeni (Series I winners) and ACS Satu Nou de Jos (Series II winners) declined promotion from Liga V Maramureș.

South Series

Pos	Team	Pld	W	D	L	GF	GA	GD	Pts	Qualification
1	Șișești	7	5	1	1	21	5	+16	16	Qualification to championship play-off
2	Progresul Șomcuta Mare	7	4	2	1	17	8	+9	14	Qualification to championship play-off
3	Academica Recea	7	4	1	2	17	12	+5	13	Qualification to championship play-off
4	Atletic Lăpuș	7	4	0	3	11	12	−1	12	Qualification to championship play-off
5	Minerul Baia Sprie	7	2	3	2	9	7	+2	9	Qualification to championship play-out
6	Lăpușul Târgu Lăpuș	7	3	0	4	14	13	+1	9	Qualification to championship play-out
7	Bradul Groșii Țibleșului	7	2	0	5	7	17	−10	6	Qualification to championship play-out
8	Fărcașa	7	0	1	6	7	29	−22	1	Qualification to championship play-out

Rules for classification: 1) Points; 2) Head-to-head points; 3) Head-to-head goal difference; 4) Head-to-head goals scored; 5) Head-to-head away goals scored; 6) Goal difference; 7) Goals scored.

North Series

Pos	Team	Pld	W	D	L	GF	GA	GD	Pts	Qualification
1	Avântul Bârsana	8	6	2	0	34	12	+22	20	Qualification to championship play-off
2	Bradul Vișeu de Sus	8	6	1	1	24	5	+19	19	Qualification to championship play-off
3	Iza Dragomirești	8	5	1	2	25	13	+12	16	Qualification to championship play-off
4	Cristalul Cavnic	8	5	0	3	29	21	+8	15	Qualification to championship play-off
5	Salina Ocna Șugatag	8	4	1	3	16	16	0	13	Qualification to championship play-out
6	Recolta Săliștea de Sus	8	3	0	5	11	26	−15	9	Qualification to championship play-out
7	Zorile Moisei	8	3	0	5	14	25	−11	9	Qualification to championship play-out
8	Remeți	8	1	0	7	9	26	−17	3	Qualification to championship play-out
9	Plimob Sighetu Marmației	8	0	1	7	14	32	−18	1	Qualification to championship play-out

Rules for classification: 1) Points; 2) Head-to-head points; 3) Head-to-head goal difference; 4) Head-to-head goals scored; 5) Head-to-head away goals scored; 6) Goal difference; 7) Goals scored.

Championship play-off

Pos	Team	Pld	W	D	L	GF	GA	GD	Pts	Qualification
1	Academica Recea (C, Q)	14	11	1	2	42	23	+19	34	Qualification to promotion play-off
2	Progresul Șomcuta Mare	14	10	2	2	44	17	+27	32	
3	Șișești	14	7	2	5	34	29	+5	23	
4	Atletic Lăpuș	14	7	2	5	26	23	+3	23	
5	Bradul Vișeu de Sus	14	7	0	7	26	28	−2	21	
6	Avântul Bârsana	14	6	0	8	31	31	0	18	
7	Iza Dragomirești	14	4	1	9	22	31	−9	13	
8	Cristalul Cavnic (Note: Cristalul Cavnic withdrew after the 6th round and forfeited all remaining matches 0–3.) (D)	14	0	0	14	9	52	−43	0	Withdrew

Rules for classification: 1) Points; 2) Head-to-head points; 3) Head-to-head goal difference; 4) Head-to-head goals scored; 5) Head-to-head away goals scored; 6) Goal difference; 7) Goals scored.
(C) Champions; (D) Disqualified; (Q) Qualified for the phase indicated
Notes:

Championship play-out

Pos	Team	Pld	W	D	L	GF	GA	GD	Pts	Relegation
9	Minerul Baia Sprie	8	6	1	1	28	9	+19	19	
10	Lăpușul Târgu Lăpuș	8	6	0	2	25	12	+13	18	
11	Salina Ocna Șugatag	8	5	0	3	28	16	+12	15	
12	Zorile Moisei	8	5	0	3	23	23	0	15	
13	Plimob Sighetu Marmației	8	4	1	3	22	23	−1	13	
14	Fărcașa	8	4	0	4	31	23	+8	12	
15	Remeți	8	3	0	5	15	18	−3	9	
16	Recolta Săliștea de Sus	8	2	0	6	16	40	−24	6	
17	Bradul Groșii Țibleșului	8	0	0	8	1	25	−24	0	Relegation to Liga V Maramureș

Rules for classification: 1) Points; 2) Head-to-head points; 3) Head-to-head goal difference; 4) Head-to-head goals scored; 5) Head-to-head away goals scored; 6) Goal difference; 7) Goals scored.

=== Mehedinți County ===
Team changes from the previous season

- CFR Turnu Severin was readmitted after having withdrawn in the previous season.
- CSL Gogoșu, Avântul Bistrița, Viitorul Dârvari, Voința Oprișor, Viitorul Grozești and AS Strehaia withdrew.
- Victoria Drobeta-Turnu Severin was admitted upon request.

Pos	Team	Pld	W	D	L	GF	GA	GD	Pts	Qualification or relegation
1	Viitorul Severin (C, Q)	28	25	1	2	187	18	+169	76	Qualification to promotion play-off
2	Drobeta 2024	28	24	2	2	130	32	+98	74	
3	CFR Turnu Severin	28	22	1	5	100	24	+76	67	
4	Recolta Dănceu	28	21	2	5	93	38	+55	65	
5	Pandurii Cerneți	28	17	2	9	91	53	+38	53	
6	Sănătatea Breznița-Ocol	28	15	5	8	89	43	+46	50	
7	Unirea Gârla Mare	28	10	5	13	56	71	−15	35	
8	Victoria Drobeta-Turnu Severin	28	10	5	13	53	76	−23	35	
9	Decebal Eșelnița	28	10	3	15	52	92	−40	33	
10	Viitorul Cujmir	28	9	1	18	51	95	−44	28	
11	Noapteșa	28	8	2	18	45	112	−67	26	
12	Victoria Strehaia	28	5	5	18	28	85	−57	20	
13	Victoria Vânju Mare	28	5	4	19	32	84	−52	19	
14	Academia Flavius Stoican	28	5	2	21	43	112	−69	17	
15	Coșuștea Căzănești	28	3	2	23	33	148	−115	11	
16	Inter Salcia (Note: Inter Salcia withdrew.) (D)	0	0	0	0	0	0	0	0	Withdrew

Rules for classification: 1) Points; 2) Head-to-head points; 3) Head-to-head goal difference; 4) Head-to-head goals scored; 5) Head-to-head away goals scored; 6) Goal difference; 7) Goals scored.
(C) Champions; (D) Disqualified; (Q) Qualified for the phase indicated

=== Mureș County ===
Team changes from the previous season

- CSM Sighișoara (17th place) was relegated to Liga V Mureș.
- CS Iernut declined promotion to Liga III.
- Viitorul Jabenița (winners) and Scânteia Crăciunești (runners-up) declined promotion from Liga V Mureș.
- ASF Pogăceaua and Atletic Târgu Mureș withdrew.
- Chimica Târnăveni was spared from relegation.
- Vulturii Târgu Mureș was admitted upon request.

Series I

Pos	Team	Pld	W	D	L	GF	GA	GD	Pts	Qualification or relegation
1	Iernut	14	11	1	2	45	14	+31	34	Qualification to championship play-off
2	Academica Transilvania Târgu Mureș	14	9	4	1	44	14	+30	31	Qualification to championship play-off
3	A&A Grup Târnăveni	14	9	2	3	46	16	+30	29	Qualification to championship play-off
4	Gaz Metan Daneș	14	9	1	4	49	21	+28	28	Qualification to championship play-out
5	Mureșul Luduș	14	5	3	6	24	26	−2	18	Qualification to championship play-out
6	Vulturii Târgu Mureș	14	4	2	8	24	40	−16	14	Qualification to championship play-out
7	Búzásbesenyő Valea Izvoarelor	14	1	1	12	26	66	−40	4	Qualification to championship play-out
8	Chimica Târnăveni	14	1	0	13	9	70	−61	3	Qualification to championship play-out

Rules for classification: 1) Points; 2) Head-to-head points; 3) Head-to-head goal difference; 4) Head-to-head goals scored; 5) Head-to-head away goals scored; 6) Goal difference; 7) Goals scored.

Series II

Pos	Team	Pld	W	D	L	GF	GA	GD	Pts	Qualification or relegation
1	ASA Târgu Mureș	14	13	0	1	89	11	+78	39	Qualification to championship play-off
2	Sâncrai Nazna	14	11	1	2	43	18	+25	34	Qualification to championship play-off
3	Mureșul Rușii-Munți	14	8	3	3	37	29	+8	27	Qualification to championship play-off
4	Câmpia Râciu	14	7	2	5	22	15	+7	23	Qualification to championship play-out
5	Sovata	14	6	2	6	28	41	−13	20	Qualification to championship play-out
6	Sângeorgiu de Pădure	14	1	4	9	17	48	−31	7	Qualification to championship play-out
7	Miercurea Nirajului	14	2	1	11	15	47	−32	7	Qualification to championship play-out
8	Viitorul Aluniș	14	1	1	12	8	50	−42	4	Qualification to championship play-out

Rules for classification: 1) Points; 2) Head-to-head points; 3) Head-to-head goal difference; 4) Head-to-head goals scored; 5) Head-to-head away goals scored; 6) Goal difference; 7) Goals scored.

Championship play-off

The play-off was played as a double round-robin tournament. Based on their position in the regular season, the teams started the play-off with the following points: 1st place – 3 points, 2nd place – 2 points, 3rd place – 1 point.

Pos	Team	Pld	W	D	L	GF	GA	GD	Pts	Qualification
1	ASA Târgu Mureș (C, Q)	10	6	2	2	32	20	+12	23	Qualification to promotion play-off
2	Iernut	10	5	2	3	23	14	+9	20	
3	Academica Transilvania Târgu Mureș	10	6	0	4	25	20	+5	20	
4	A&A Grup Târnăveni	10	5	1	4	21	20	+1	17	
5	Sâncrai Nazna	10	2	3	5	13	23	−10	11	
6	Mureșul Rușii-Munți	10	2	0	8	21	38	−17	7	

Rules for classification: 1) Points; 2) Head-to-head points; 3) Head-to-head goal difference; 4) Head-to-head goals scored; 5) Head-to-head away goals scored; 6) Goal difference; 7) Goals scored.
(C) Champions; (Q) Qualified for the phase indicated

Championship play-out

The play-out was played as a single round-robin tournament. Based on their position in the regular season, the teams began the play-out with the following points: 4th place – 4 points, 5th place – 3 points, 6th place – 2 points, 7th place – 1 point, and 8th place – 0 points.

Pos	Team	Pld	W	D	L	GF	GA	GD	Pts	Relegation
7	Vulturii Târgu Mureș	9	7	2	0	35	6	+29	25	
8	Miercurea Nirajului	9	5	2	2	33	13	+20	19	
9	Câmpia Râciu	9	4	3	2	23	17	+6	19	
10	Sângeorgiu de Pădure	9	4	4	1	22	12	+10	17	
11	Mureșul Luduș	9	4	2	3	18	10	+8	17	
12	Sovata	9	4	1	4	26	23	+3	16	
13	Gaz Metan Daneș	9	2	2	5	18	46	−28	12	
14	Búzásbesenyő Valea Izvoarelor	9	3	1	5	26	26	0	11	
15	Viitorul Aluniș (R)	9	2	2	5	20	27	−7	8	Relegation to Liga V Mureș
16	Chimica Târnăveni (R)	9	0	1	8	10	51	−41	1	Relegation to Liga V Mureș

Rules for classification: 1) Points; 2) Head-to-head points; 3) Head-to-head goal difference; 4) Head-to-head goals scored; 5) Head-to-head away goals scored; 6) Goal difference; 7) Goals scored.
(R) Relegated

=== Neamț County ===
Team changes from the previous season

- Ceahlăul Piatra Neamț II achieved promotion to Liga III.
- Vulturul Costișa (17th place) and Unirea Dulcești (20th place) were relegated to Liga V Neamț.
- Viitorul Borca and Biruința Gherăești withdrew during the previous season.
- Victoria Horia, Ozana Timișești and Unirea Tămășeni withdrew.
- Viitorul Podoleni and ASF Girov were spared from relegation.

Pos	Team	Pld	W	D	L	GF	GA	GD	Pts	Qualification or relegation
1	Roman (C, Q)	24	21	2	1	113	21	+92	65	Qualification to promotion play-off
2	Speranța Răucești	24	18	2	4	87	34	+53	56	
3	Unirea Trifești	24	16	4	4	61	39	+22	52	
4	Voința Ion Creangă	24	16	3	5	102	35	+67	51	
5	Viitorul Tarcău	24	15	3	6	68	39	+29	48	
6	Grumăzești	24	11	3	10	63	56	+7	36	
7	Viitorul Podoleni	24	10	3	11	56	44	+12	33	
8	Pietricica Piatra Neamț	24	8	4	12	46	69	−23	28	
9	Spartanii Săbăoani	24	6	4	14	50	70	−20	22	
10	Siretul Doljești	24	6	2	16	38	85	−47	20	
11	Girov	24	4	4	16	34	89	−55	16	
12	Borussia Pângărați	24	4	2	18	49	109	−60	14	
13	Voința Dochia	24	1	4	19	32	109	−77	7	

Rules for classification: 1) Points; 2) Head-to-head points; 3) Head-to-head goal difference; 4) Head-to-head goals scored; 5) Head-to-head away goals scored; 6) Goal difference; 7) Goals scored.
(C) Champions; (Q) Qualified for the phase indicated

=== Olt County ===
Team changes from the previous season

- Lupii Profa (Series I winners) was promoted from Liga V Olt.
- Victoria Dăneasa (14th place) was relegated to Liga V Olt.
- ACS Voineasa (Series II winners) and Șoimii Drăghiceni (Series III winners) declined promotion from Liga V Olt.
- ACS Caracal, Recolta Stoicănești and Viitorul Coteana withdrew.
- Voința Schitu and Oltețul Osica were spared from relegation.
- Unirea 2024 Radomirești, Academica Balș and Gladius Dobrosloveni were admitted upon request.

Pos	Team	Pld	W	D	L	GF	GA	GD	Pts	Qualification or relegation
1	Lupii Profa (C, Q)	26	22	2	2	125	23	+102	68	Qualification to promotion play-off
2	Viitorul Știința Drăgănești-Olt	26	18	3	5	78	35	+43	57	
3	Academica Balș	26	17	6	3	97	21	+76	57	
4	Unirea 2024 Radomirești	26	17	3	6	97	39	+58	54	
5	Oltețul Osica	26	16	5	5	65	39	+26	53	
6	Iris Titulescu	26	15	5	6	85	41	+44	50	
7	Știința Mărunței	26	14	2	10	92	44	+48	44	
8	Oltul Slătioara	26	13	3	10	77	68	+9	42	
9	Viitorul Osica de Jos	26	9	2	15	57	78	−21	29	
10	Unirea Pârșcoveni	26	8	1	17	52	85	−33	25	
11	Olt Scornicești	26	5	1	20	37	89	−52	16	
12	Viitorul Rusănești (R)	26	4	1	21	34	128	−94	13	Relegation to Liga V Olt
13	Voința Schitu (R)	26	4	0	22	29	116	−87	12	Relegation to Liga V Olt
14	Gladius Dobrosloveni (R)	26	3	0	23	20	139	−119	6 (Note: Gladius Dobrosloveni deducted 3 points.)	Relegation to Liga V Olt

Rules for classification: 1) Points; 2) Head-to-head points; 3) Head-to-head goal difference; 4) Head-to-head goals scored; 5) Head-to-head away goals scored; 6) Goal difference; 7) Goals scored.
(C) Champions; (Q) Qualified for the phase indicated; (R) Relegated

=== Prahova County ===
Team changes from the previous season

- CSO Băicoi achieved promotion to Liga III.
- CSC Berceni (17th place, excluded) and Unirea Urlați (18th place) were relegated to Liga V Prahova.
- Tineretul Gura Vitioarei (winners), CS Valea Călugărească (runners-up) and CS Bucov (3rd place) were promoted from Liga V Prahova.
- Triumf Poiana Câmpina ceded its place to Progresul Drăgănești.

Pos	Team	Pld	W	D	L	GF	GA	GD	Pts	Qualification or relegation
1	Teleajenul Vălenii de Munte (C, Q)	34	29	2	3	149	20	+129	89	Qualification to promotion play-off
2	Boldești-Scăeni	34	29	1	4	150	30	+120	88	
3	Comarnic	34	27	2	5	103	23	+80	83	
4	Câmpina	34	24	3	7	108	52	+56	75	
5	Progresul Drăgănești	34	22	2	10	102	55	+47	68	
6	Avântul Măneciu	34	21	4	9	85	42	+43	67	
7	Bănești-Urleta	34	18	5	11	108	70	+38	59	
8	Cornu	34	18	4	12	98	65	+33	58	
9	Vărbilău	34	15	6	13	64	53	+11	51	
10	Brebu	34	11	8	15	71	82	−11	41	
11	Petrosport Ploiești	34	11	5	18	56	97	−41	38	
12	Mănești	34	9	8	17	79	118	−39	35	
13	Bucov	34	11	2	21	44	96	−52	35	
14	Valea Călugărească	34	9	3	22	53	111	−58	30	
15	Tineretul Gura Vitioarei	34	7	4	23	46	111	−65	25	
16	Brazi (Note: Brazi was spared from relegation due to the promotion of Teleajenul Vălenii de Munte in Liga III.)	34	4	5	25	33	87	−54	17	Spared from relegation
17	Petrolul 95 Ploiești (R)	34	4	4	26	43	153	−110	16	Relegation to Liga V Prahova
18	Unirea Cocorăștii Colț (R)	34	2	2	30	19	146	−127	8	Relegation to Liga V Prahova

Rules for classification: 1) Points; 2) Head-to-head points; 3) Head-to-head goal difference; 4) Head-to-head goals scored; 5) Head-to-head away goals scored; 6) Goal difference; 7) Goals scored.
(C) Champions; (Q) Qualified for the phase indicated; (R) Relegated

=== Satu Mare County ===
Team changes from the previous season

- Someșul Odoreu (11th place; withdrew) and Stăruința Berveni (12th place; withdrew) were relegated to Liga V Satu Mare.
- CSM Satu Mare II (Series B winners) was promoted from Liga V Satu Mare.
- Frohlich Foieni (Series A winners) declined promotion from Liga V Satu Mare.
- AS Căpleni and Schwaben Kalmandi Cămin withdrew.
- Victoria Carei withdrew from Liga III and was enrolled in Liga IV Satu Mare upon request.

Pos	Team	Pld	W	D	L	GF	GA	GD	Pts	Qualification
1	Unirea Tășnad	18	16	0	2	64	17	+47	48	Qualification to championship play-off
2	Oașul Negrești-Oaș	18	15	0	3	65	16	+49	45	Qualification to championship play-off
3	Recolta Dorolț	18	13	1	4	58	29	+29	40	Qualification to championship play-off
4	Talna Orașu Nou	18	11	1	6	41	28	+13	34	Qualification to championship play-off
5	Turul Micula	18	8	1	9	36	43	−7	25	Qualification to championship play-out
6	Știința Beltiug	18	6	2	10	35	57	−22	20	Qualification to championship play-out
7	Fortuna Căpleni	18	6	2	10	25	56	−31	20	Qualification to championship play-out
8	Victoria Carei	18	5	2	11	33	48	−15	17	Qualification to championship play-out
9	Satu Mare II	18	4	1	13	32	56	−24	13	Qualification to championship play-out
10	Botiz	18	1	0	17	12	51	−39	3	Qualification to championship play-out

Rules for classification: 1) Points; 2) Head-to-head points; 3) Head-to-head goal difference; 4) Head-to-head goals scored; 5) Head-to-head away goals scored; 6) Goal difference; 7) Goals scored.

Championship play-out

The championship play-out was held as a single round-robin tournament among the last six teams of the regular season.

Pos	Team	Pld	W	D	L	GF	GA	GD	Pts	Relegation
5	Victoria Carei	2	1	1	0	8	5	+3	4	
6	Fortuna Căpleni	3	1	1	1	8	10	−2	4	
7	Turul Micula	2	1	0	1	6	4	+2	3	
8	Satu Mare II	1	0	0	1	1	4	−3	0	
9	Știința Beltiug (Note: Știința Beltiug and Botiz withdrew.)	0	0	0	0	0	0	0	0	Withdrew
10	Botiz	0	0	0	0	0	0	0	0	Withdrew

Updated to match(es) played on 25 May 2025. Source:
Rules for classification: 1) Points; 2) Head-to-head points; 3) Head-to-head goal difference; 4) Head-to-head goals scored; 5) Head-to-head away goals scored; 6) Goal difference; 7) Goals scored.
Notes:

Championship play-off
Semi-finals

The matches were played on 11 and 17 May 2025.

Team 1	Agg.	Team 2	1st leg	2nd leg
Recolta Dorolț	2–5	Oașul Negrești-Oaș	1–0	1–5
Talna Orașu Nou	0–3	Unirea Tășnad	0–1	0–2

Final

The matches were played on 1 and 7 June 2025.

Team 1	Agg.	Team 2	1st leg	2nd leg
Oașul Negrești-Oaș	2–5	Unirea Tășnad	2–1	0–4

Unirea Tășnad won the Liga IV Satu Mare County and qualified for the promotion play-off in Liga III.

=== Sălaj County ===
Team changes from the previous season

- Unirea Ciocmani-Băbeni (East Series winners) and Stejarul Sâg (West Series winners) were promoted from Liga V Sălaj.
- Barcău Nușfalău and Luceafărul Bălan withdrew.
- Unirea Mirșid and AS Cosniciu were spared from relegation.

Pos	Team	Pld	W	D	L	GF	GA	GD	Pts	Qualification or relegation
1	Chieșd (C, Q)	26	23	2	1	159	27	+132	71	Qualification to promotion play-off
2	Inter Cizer	26	20	6	0	107	31	+76	66	
3	Someșul Someș-Odorhei	26	19	2	5	69	31	+38	59	
4	Unirea Mirșid	26	17	5	4	86	34	+52	56	
5	Cetatea Buciumi	26	13	2	11	66	55	+11	41	
6	Jibou	26	12	2	12	56	63	−7	38	
7	Bănișor-Peceiu	26	11	2	13	60	81	−21	35	
8	Rapid Zimbor	26	10	0	16	62	78	−16	30	
9	Ardealul Crișeni	26	9	3	14	52	87	−35	30	
10	Venus Giurtelec	26	9	2	15	65	105	−40	29	
11	Creaca Jac	26	7	4	15	49	77	−28	25	
12	Cosniciu	26	7	4	15	49	79	−30	25	
13	Unirea Ciocmani-Băbeni (R)	26	4	1	21	30	82	−52	13	Relegation to Liga V Sălaj
14	Stejarul Sâg (R)	26	3	1	22	41	121	−80	10	Relegation to Liga V Sălaj

Rules for classification: 1) Points; 2) Head-to-head points; 3) Head-to-head goal difference; 4) Head-to-head goals scored; 5) Head-to-head away goals scored; 6) Goal difference; 7) Goals scored.
(C) Champions; (Q) Qualified for the phase indicated; (R) Relegated

=== Sibiu County ===
Team changes from the previous season

- Leii Șura Mică (12th place), Alma Sibiu (13th place) and Unirea Miercurea Sibiului (14th place; withdrew) were relegated to Liga V Sibiu.
- Arsenal Dârlos (Mediaș Series winners), AFC Miercurea Sibiului 2021 (Sibiu Series winners) and Recolta Alma (Mediaș Series runners-up and play-off winners) were promoted from Liga V Sibiu.
- Flacăra Gaz-Metan Mediaș replaced Voința Dumbrăveni which withdrew.

Pos	Team	Pld	W	D	L	GF	GA	GD	Pts	Qualification or relegation
1	Inter Sibiu (C, Q)	26	23	3	0	185	23	+162	72	Qualification to promotion play-off
2	Agnita	26	20	4	2	143	24	+119	64	
3	Bradu	26	16	6	4	100	29	+71	54	
4	Voința Sibiu	26	17	3	6	96	31	+65	54	
5	Păltiniș Rășinari	26	16	4	6	136	51	+85	52	
6	Avrig	26	13	4	9	74	52	+22	43	
7	Miercurea Sibiului 2021	26	13	2	11	70	78	−8	41	
8	Tălmaciu	26	10	1	15	58	80	−22	31	
9	Quantum/Cuantic Arsenal Sibiu	26	8	4	14	52	93	−41	28	
10	Arsenal Dârlos (R)	26	8	2	16	66	123	−57	26	Relegation to Liga V Sibiu
11	Copșa Mică (R)	26	8	2	16	46	128	−82	26	Relegation to Liga V Sibiu
12	Sparta Mediaș (Note: Sparta Mediaș withdrew after the first half of the season and lost all remaining matches by 0–3.) (R)	26	5	3	18	34	72	−38	18	Relegation to Liga V Sibiu
13	Recolta Alma (R)	26	4	0	22	35	157	−122	12	Relegation to Liga V Sibiu
14	Flacăra Gaz-Metan Mediaș (R)	26	2	0	24	28	182	−154	6	Relegation to Liga V Sibiu

Rules for classification: 1) Points; 2) Head-to-head points; 3) Head-to-head goal difference; 4) Head-to-head goals scored; 5) Head-to-head away goals scored; 6) Goal difference; 7) Goals scored.
(C) Champions; (Q) Qualified for the phase indicated; (R) Relegated

=== Suceava County ===
Team changes from the previous season

- Șoimii Gura Humorului achieved promotion to Liga III.
- Bucovina Rădăuți II (15th place; withdrew) was relegated to Liga V Suceava.
- Releul Mihoveni Șcheia (Series I winners) and Larix Dornișoara (Series I winners) declined promotion.
- Șomuzul Preutești, Sporting Poieni Solca, Bucovina Dărmănești and ASA Rarău Câmpulung Moldovenesc withdrew.
- Zimbrul Siret, Dream Team Ipotești and Cetatea Suceava were admitted upon request.

Pos	Team	Pld	W	D	L	GF	GA	GD	Pts	Qualification or relegation
1	Cetatea Suceava (C, Q)	22	21	1	0	132	15	+117	64	Qualification to promotion play-off
2	Viitorul Liteni	22	17	3	2	70	23	+47	54	
3	Juniorul Salcea	22	16	1	5	81	40	+41	49	
4	Bradul Putna	22	14	2	6	71	38	+33	44	
5	Forestierul Frumosu	22	10	2	10	46	50	−4	32	
6	Progresul Frătăuții Vechi	22	10	1	11	45	49	−4	31	
7	Juniorul Suceava	22	8	3	11	55	64	−9	27	
8	Moldova Drăgușeni	22	8	3	11	59	75	−16	27	
9	Minerul Iacobeni	22	8	1	13	47	61	−14	25	
10	Dream Team Ipotești	22	5	4	13	41	59	−18	19	
11	Zimbrul Siret (R)	22	3	0	19	24	103	−79	9	Relegation to Liga V Suceava
12	Recolta Fântânele (R)	22	1	1	20	18	112	−94	4	Relegation to Liga V Suceava

Rules for classification: 1) Points; 2) Head-to-head points; 3) Head-to-head goal difference; 4) Head-to-head goals scored; 5) Head-to-head away goals scored; 6) Goal difference; 7) Goals scored.
(C) Champions; (Q) Qualified for the phase indicated; (R) Relegated

=== Teleorman County ===
Team changes from the previous season

- Victoria Lunca (12th place; excluded) and Viitorul Piatra (13th plac; withdrew) were relegated to Liga V Teleorman.
- Tineretul Suhaia (winners) and Vulturii Mereni (4th place) were promoted from Liga V Teleorman.
- Steaua Roșie Bujoru (runners-up) and CSC Putineiu (3rd place) declined promotion from Liga V Teleorman.
- Atletic Orbeasca took the place of CS Vârtoape.

Pos	Team	Pld	W	D	L	GF	GA	GD	Pts	Qualification or relegation
1	Nanov (C, Q)	26	25	0	1	108	17	+91	75	Qualification to promotion play-off
2	Dinamic Kids Videle	26	18	4	4	90	43	+47	58	
3	Astra Plosca	26	15	4	7	69	42	+27	49	
4	Rapid Buzescu	26	15	4	7	67	45	+22	49	
5	Voința Saelele 2017	26	13	3	10	65	55	+10	42	
6	Drăgănești-Vlașca	26	12	4	10	65	51	+14	40	
7	Avântul Bragadiru	26	11	6	9	32	38	−6	39	
8	Metalul Peretu	26	10	6	10	45	50	−5	36	
9	Viitorul Lunca	26	10	3	13	45	52	−7	33	
10	Seaca	26	8	3	15	45	68	−23	27	
11	Tineretul Suhaia	26	7	6	13	42	65	−23	27	
12	Steaua Spătărei	26	7	4	15	36	58	−22	25	
13	Atletic Orbeasca (R)	26	5	3	18	29	81	−52	18	Relegation to Liga V Teleorman
14	Vulturii Mereni (Note: Vulturii Mereni withdrew after 13 rounds and lost all their remaining matches by 0–3.) (R)	26	1	0	25	16	89	−73	3	Relegation to Liga V Teleorman

Rules for classification: 1) Points; 2) Head-to-head points; 3) Head-to-head goal difference; 4) Head-to-head goals scored; 5) Head-to-head away goals scored; 6) Goal difference; 7) Goals scored.
(C) Champions; (Q) Qualified for the phase indicated; (R) Relegated

=== Timiș County ===
Team changes from the previous season

- Timișul Șag achieved promotion to Liga III.
- Voința Mașloc-Pișchia (18th place), Avântul Topolovățu Mare (19th place) and Unirea Jimbolia (20th place) were relegated to Liga V Timiș.
- CSC Ghiroda II (Series II winners) and AS Recaș (Series III winners) were promoted from Liga V Timiș.
- Vulturii Igriș (Series I winners) declined promotion from Liga V Timiș.
- CS Comloșu Mare and Progresul Gătaia withdrew.

Pos	Team	Pld	W	D	L	GF	GA	GD	Pts	Qualification or relegation
1	Lugoj (C, Q)	30	27	1	2	81	15	+66	82	Qualification to promotion play-off
2	Sânandrei Carani	30	22	5	3	83	29	+54	71	
3	Flacăra Parța	30	18	5	7	78	44	+34	59	
4	UVT Timișoara	30	17	7	6	65	26	+39	58	
5	Deta	30	18	3	9	73	47	+26	57	
6	Unirea Sânnicolau Mare	30	13	6	11	66	64	+2	45	
7	Liebling	30	10	10	10	46	44	+2	40	
8	Millenium Giarmata	30	10	8	12	51	64	−13	38	
9	Belinț	30	10	8	12	46	58	−12	38	
10	Progresul Ciacova	30	9	7	14	47	67	−20	34	
11	Gloria Moșnița Nouă	30	7	12	11	49	45	+4	33	
12	Cocoșul Orțișoara	30	9	5	16	50	71	−21	32	
13	Pobeda Stár Bišnov	30	7	5	18	49	78	−29	26	
14	Gelu	30	5	6	19	34	76	−42	21	
15	Ghiroda II	30	6	3	21	47	85	−38	21	
16	Recaș (R)	30	4	5	21	35	87	−52	17	Relegation to Liga V Timiș

Rules for classification: 1) Points; 2) Head-to-head points; 3) Head-to-head goal difference; 4) Head-to-head goals scored; 5) Head-to-head away goals scored; 6) Goal difference; 7) Goals scored.
(C) Champions; (Q) Qualified for the phase indicated; (R) Relegated

=== Tulcea County ===
The Liga IV Tulcea County was played over two stages. The regular season consisted of a double round-robin format featuring thirteen teams. At the end of this phase, the top four teams qualified for the championship play-off. Only teams with legal personality and holding a C.I.S. (Certificate of Sports Identity) issued by the Ministry of Youth and Sport were eligible to participate in the championship play-off.

Team changes from the previous season

- Delta Tulcea withdrew.
- Beroe Ostrov was admitted upon request.
- Șoimii Topolog was renamed Liceenii Topolog.
- Viitorul Murighiol was renamed Pelicanul Murighiol.

Pos	Team	Pld	W	D	L	GF	GA	GD	Pts	Qualification or relegation
1	Pescărușul Sarichioi	22	20	1	1	133	19	+114	61	Qualification to championship play-off
2	Flacăra Mihail Kogălniceanu	22	18	2	2	117	31	+86	56	Qualification to championship play-off
3	Pelicanul Murighiol	22	17	2	3	99	27	+72	53	Qualification to championship play-off
4	Progresul Isaccea	22	16	1	5	110	50	+60	49	Qualification to championship play-off
5	Liceenii Topolog	22	11	4	7	56	52	+4	37	
6	Triumf Cerna	22	8	3	11	49	62	−13	27	
7	Heracleea Enisala	22	8	3	11	50	69	−19	27	
8	Luceafărul Slava Cercheză	22	7	3	12	52	58	−6	24	
9	Național Somova	22	5	4	13	60	76	−16	19	
10	Granitul Babadag	22	6	0	16	42	126	−84	18	
11	Beroe Ostrov	22	4	1	17	35	111	−76	13	
12	Viitorul Horia	22	0	0	22	12	134	−122	0	
13	Partizanul Luncavița (Note: Partizanul Luncavița was expelled after 11 rounds and all its results were canceled.) (D)	0	0	0	0	0	0	0	0	Excluded

Rules for classification: 1) Points; 2) Head-to-head points; 3) Head-to-head goal difference; 4) Head-to-head goals scored; 5) Head-to-head away goals scored; 6) Goal difference; 7) Goals scored.
(D) Disqualified
Notes:

Championship play-off
Semi-finals

Team 1	Score	Team 2
Pescărușul Sarichioi	4–1	Progresul Isaccea
Flacăra Mihail Kogălniceanu	3–1	Pelicanul Murighiol

Final

Team 1	Score	Team 2
Pescărușul Sarichioi	4–1	Flacăra Mihail Kogălniceanu

Pescărușul Sarichioi won the Liga IV Tulcea County and qualified for the promotion play-off in Liga III.

=== Vaslui County ===
The Liga IV Vaslui County was played over two stages. The regular season consisted of a single round-robin tournament featuring twelve teams. At the end of this phase, the top six teams qualified for the championship play-off, while the bottom six teams advanced to the play-out. Both the play-off and play-out were contested in a double round-robin format, with teams carrying over all points accumulated during the regular season.

Team changes from the previous season

- Hușana Huși (Series II winners, and play-off winners), FC Ghergheleu (Series I winners and play-off runners-up) and Unirea Dodești (Series II runners-up, 3rd place in the play-off, and winners of the promotion/relegation play-offs) were promoted from Liga V Vaslui.
- Sporting Juniorul Vaslui (10th place and losers of the promotion/relegation play-offs), Victoria Muntenii de Jos (11th place) and Speranța Drânceni (12th place) were relegated to Liga V Vaslui.

Pos	Team	Pld	W	D	L	GF	GA	GD	Pts	Qualification
1	Comstar Vaslui	11	10	1	0	40	10	+30	31	Qualification to championship play-off
2	Gârceni	11	9	1	1	38	15	+23	28	Qualification to championship play-off
3	Hușana Huși	11	8	2	1	34	12	+22	26	Qualification to championship play-off
4	Sporting Banca	11	7	0	4	40	23	+17	21	Qualification to championship play-off
5	Flacăra Muntenii de Sus	11	6	1	4	35	21	+14	19	Qualification to championship play-off
6	Vulturești	11	4	2	5	15	19	−4	14	Qualification to championship play-off
7	Ghergheleu	11	4	0	7	27	43	−16	12	Qualification to championship play-out
8	Viitorul Rebricea	11	3	1	7	16	36	−20	10	Qualification to championship play-out
9	Unirea Dodești	11	2	2	7	23	29	−6	8	Qualification to championship play-out
10	Viitorul Văleni	11	2	2	7	19	32	−13	8	Qualification to championship play-out
11	Vitis Șuletea	11	2	1	8	14	39	−25	7	Qualification to championship play-out
12	Negrești	11	0	5	6	11	33	−22	5	Qualification to championship play-out

Rules for classification: 1) Points; 2) Head-to-head points; 3) Head-to-head goal difference; 4) Head-to-head goals scored; 5) Head-to-head away goals scored; 6) Goal difference; 7) Goals scored.

Championship play-off

Pos	Team	Pld	W	D	L	GF	GA	GD	Pts	Qualification
1	Comstar Vaslui (C, Q)	9	8	1	0	31	6	+25	56	Qualification for promotion play-off
2	Gârceni	10	4	2	4	21	20	+1	42	
3	Hușana Huși	10	4	1	5	18	25	−7	39	
4	Flacăra Muntenii de Sus	9	5	0	4	18	18	0	34	
5	Sporting Banca	10	3	2	5	23	19	+4	32	
6	Vulturești	10	2	0	8	15	38	−23	20	

Rules for classification: 1) Points; 2) Head-to-head points; 3) Head-to-head goal difference; 4) Head-to-head goals scored; 5) Head-to-head away goals scored; 6) Goal difference; 7) Goals scored.
(C) Champions; (Q) Qualified for the phase indicated

Championship play-out

Pos	Team	Pld	W	D	L	GF	GA	GD	Pts	Qualification or relegation
7	Unirea Dodești	10	8	2	0	39	17	+22	34	
8	Negrești	10	6	1	3	42	22	+20	24	
9	Viitorul Văleni (R)	10	3	4	3	18	19	−1	21	Qualification to relegation play-out
10	Ghergheleu (O)	10	2	2	6	19	29	−10	20	Qualification to relegation play-out
11	Vitis Șuletea (R)	10	3	3	4	19	36	−17	19	Relegation to Liga V Vaslui
12	Viitorul Rebricea (R)	10	1	2	7	14	28	−14	15	Relegation to Liga V Vaslui

Rules for classification: 1) Points; 2) Head-to-head points; 3) Head-to-head goal difference; 4) Head-to-head goals scored; 5) Head-to-head away goals scored; 6) Goal difference; 7) Goals scored.
(O) Play-off winners; (R) Relegated

Relegation play-out

The 9th- and 10th-placed teams of Liga IV faced the 3rd- and 4th-placed teams of the Liga V Vaslui County play-off.

Team 1	Agg.	Team 2	1st leg	2nd leg
Știința Delești	6–4	Viitorul Văleni	1–2	5–3 (a.e.t.)
Ghergheleu	11–8	Phoenix Team Tanacu	4–4	7–4

=== Vâlcea County ===
Team changes from the previous season

- Sparta Râmnicu Vâlcea achieved promotion to Liga III.
- Cozia Călimănești was relegated from Liga III.
- CS Mădulari (15th place, withdrew) was relegated to Liga V Vâlcea.
- ACS Păușești Măglași (winners) was promoted from Liga V Vâlcea.
- Corona Mihăești (runners-up) declined promotion from Liga V Vâlcea.
- Chimia 1973 Râmnicu Vâlcea and Oltul Ionești withdrew.
- Foresta Malaia was spared relegation.
- Viitorul Voicești and Viitorul Horezu were admitted upon request.

Pos	Team	Pld	W	D	L	GF	GA	GD	Pts	Qualification or relegation
1	Păușești Otăsău (C, Q)	30	28	2	0	181	15	+166	86	Qualification for promotion play-off
2	Cozia Călimănești	30	26	2	2	118	31	+87	80	
3	Oltețul Alunu	30	21	3	6	83	50	+33	66	
4	Păușești Măglași	30	21	3	6	119	50	+69	66	
5	Unirea Tomșani	30	13	6	11	88	77	+11	45	
6	Minerul Costești	30	13	4	13	63	70	−7	43	
7	Viitorul Horezu	30	12	6	12	74	55	+19	42	
8	Viitorul Mateești	30	12	4	14	55	69	−14	40	
9	Băbeni	30	11	3	16	45	86	−41	36	
10	Foresta Malaia	30	10	4	16	57	84	−27	34	
11	Viitorul Budești	30	11	1	18	74	103	−29	34	
12	Lotru Brezoi	30	10	2	18	53	106	−53	32	
13	Gușoeni	30	9	4	17	76	115	−39	31	
14	Atletic Drăgășani	30	7	4	19	35	76	−41	25	
15	Viitorul Voicești (R)	30	7	0	23	52	115	−63	21	Relegation to Liga V Vâlcea
16	Minerul Berbești (Note: Minerul Berbești was excluded after 21 rounds and lost all matches from the second half of the season by default, 0–3.) (R)	30	5	0	25	35	106	−71	15	Relegation to Liga V Vâlcea

Rules for classification: 1) Points; 2) Head-to-head points; 3) Head-to-head goal difference; 4) Head-to-head goals scored; 5) Head-to-head away goals scored; 6) Goal difference; 7) Goals scored.
(C) Champions; (Q) Qualified for the phase indicated; (R) Relegated

=== Vrancea County ===
Team changes from the previous season

- CSM Adjud 1946 achieved promotion to Liga III.
- Viitorul Măicănești was admitted upon request.
- Siretul Suraia was renamed Viitorul Suraia.

Pos	Team	Pld	W	D	L	GF	GA	GD	Pts	Qualification or relegation
1	Victoria Gugești (C, Q)	28	26	2	0	150	21	+129	80	Qualification for promotion play-off
2	Sportul Ciorăști	28	22	3	3	87	28	+59	69	
3	Viitorul Mărășești (Note: The match between Viitorul Mărășești and Victoria Gologanu from the 28th round was annulled and recorded as a 0–3 loss for both teams due to a mass brawl involving players from both sides.)	27	20	1	6	82	36	+46	61	
4	Energia Vulturu	28	18	2	8	87	47	+40	56	
5	Panciu	28	17	4	7	69	32	+37	55	
6	Victoria Gologanu	27	15	4	8	59	35	+24	49	
7	Dinamo Tătăranu	28	12	2	14	63	70	−7	38	
8	Trotușul Ruginești	28	11	3	14	51	81	−30	36	
9	Homocea	28	11	1	16	41	62	−21	34	
10	Viitorul Măicănești	28	9	3	16	52	73	−21	30	
11	Căiata	28	8	3	17	52	80	−28	27	
12	Național Golești	28	9	0	19	56	104	−48	27	
13	Viitorul Suraia	28	8	1	19	45	77	−32	25	
14	Gloria Bălești	28	8	1	19	43	104	−61	25	
15	Dumbrăveni (Note: Dumbrăveni withdrew after 14 rounds and forfeited all remaining matches with 0–3 losses.)	28	0	0	28	6	93	−87	0	

Rules for classification: 1) Points; 2) Head-to-head points; 3) Head-to-head goal difference; 4) Head-to-head goals scored; 5) Head-to-head away goals scored; 6) Goal difference; 7) Goals scored.
(C) Champions; (Q) Qualified for the phase indicated

== See also ==
- 2024–25 Liga I
- 2024–25 Liga II
- 2024–25 Liga III
- 2024–25 Cupa României
