= Liga IV Giurgiu =

Fourth tier Romanian football league

- Founded: 1981
- Country: Romania
- Level on pyramid: 4
- Promotion to: Liga III
- Relegation to: Liga V Giurgiu
- Domestic cup: Cupa României – County phase
- Current champions: Victoria Adunații-Copăceni (3rd title) (2025–26)
- Most championships: Petrolul Roata de Jos (9 titles)
- Website: frf-ajf.ro/giurgiu
- Current: 2025–26 Liga IV Giurgiu

Liga IV Giurgiu is one of the regional football divisions of Liga IV, the fourth tier of the Romanian football league system, for clubs based in Giurgiu County, and is organized by AJF Giurgiu – Asociația Județeană de Fotbal (lit. 'County Football Association').

It is contested by a variable number of teams, depending on the number of teams relegated from Liga III, the number of teams promoted from Liga V Giurgiu, and the teams that withdraw or enter the competition. The winner may or may not be promoted to Liga III, depending on the result of a promotion play-off contested against the winner of a neighboring county series.

== History ==
The Giurgiu County Championship was formed in 1981 and placed under the authority of the newly established Consiliul Județean pentru Educație Fizică și Sport (lit. 'County Council for Physical Education and Sports') in Giurgiu, following the territorial reorganization of the country in February of that year. As part of this reform, Ilfov and Ialomița counties were divided, leading to the creation of the new counties of Giurgiu and Călărași.

Initially, the 1980–81 football season had begun under the previous administrative structure, with teams from the area that would later form Giurgiu County still competing in the Ilfov County Championship. After the reorganization, the competition resumed in a revised format, split into a North and a South zone. Petrolul Roata de Jos emerged as the winner of the North zone, while Constructorul Giurgiu won the South zone. The winners of the two zones faced each other in a final to determine the first county champion. Petrolul Roata de Jos initially won the first leg, but the result was annulled due to certain irregularities. The match was subsequently replayed, and the final outcome confirmed Petrolul Roata de Jos as the first official champion of Giurgiu County.

Since then, the structure and organization of Giurgiu’s main county competition, like those of other county championships, have undergone numerous changes. Between 1981 and 1992, it was known as Campionatul Județean (County Championship). In 1992, it was renamed Divizia C – Faza Județeană (Divizia C – County Phase), became Divizia D in 1997, and has been known as Liga IV since 2006.

== Promotion ==
The champions of each county association play against one another in a play-off to earn promotion to Liga III. Geographical criteria are taken into consideration when the play-offs are drawn. In total, there are 41 county champions plus the Bucharest municipal champion.

== List of champions ==
Ed.	Season	Winners
County Championship
1	1980–81	Petrolul Roata de Jos
2	1981–82	Petrolul Bolintin-Vale
3	1982–83	Argeșul 30 Decembrie
4	1983–84	Constructorul TCIAZ Giurgiu
5	1984–85	Petrolul Roata de Jos
6	1985–86	Petrolul Roata de Jos
7	1986–87	Utilaje Grele Giurgiu
8	1987–88	Șantierul Naval Giurgiu
9	1988–89	Rapid Braniștea
10	1989–90	Știința Băneasa
11	1990–91	Petrolul Roata de Jos
12	1991–92	Rapid Braniștea
Divizia C – County phase
13	1992–93	Dunărea Giurgiu
14	1993–94	Dunărea Giurgiu
15	1994–95	Petrolul Roata de Jos
16	1995–96	Gene Stănești
17	1996–97	Petrolul Roata de Jos
Divizia D
18	1997–98	Petrolul Roata de Jos
19	1998–99	Petrolul Roata de Jos
20	1999–00	Neoconstruct Mihai Bravu
21	2000–01	Unirea Tricolor Bolintin-Vale
22	2001–02	Săgeata Brăniștari
23	2002–03	Constructorul Braniștea
24	2003–04	Tigar Giurgiu
25	2004–05	Argeșul Mihăilești
26	2005–06	Nova Force Giurgiu

Ed.	Season	Winners
Liga IV
27	2006–07	Nova Force Giurgiu
28	2007–08	Constructorul Bolintin-Deal
29	2008–09	Viitorul Toporu
30	2009–10	Nova Force Giurgiu
31	2010–11	Rapid Clejani
32	2011–12	Avântul Florești
33	2012–13	Bolintin Malu Spart
34	2013–14	Petrolul Roata Cartojani
35	2014–15	Arsenal Malu
36	2015–16	Arsenal Malu
37	2016–17	Dunărea Giurgiu
38	2017–18	Singureni
39	2018–19	Mihai Bravu
40	2019–20	Argeșul Mihăilești
41	2020–21	Victoria Adunații-Copăceni
42	2021–22	Victoria Adunații-Copăceni
43	2022–23	Dunărea Giurgiu
44	2023–24	Bolintin Malu Spart
45	2024–25	AXI Adunații-Copăceni
46	2025–26	Victoria Adunații-Copăceni

== See also ==
=== Main Leagues ===
- Liga I
- Liga II
- Liga III
- Liga IV

=== County Leagues (Liga IV series) ===
North–East

- Liga IV Bacău
- Liga IV Botoșani
- Liga IV Iași
- Liga IV Neamț
- Liga IV Suceava
- Liga IV Vaslui

North–West

- Liga IV Bihor
- Liga IV Bistrița-Năsăud
- Liga IV Cluj
- Liga IV Maramureș
- Liga IV Satu Mare
- Liga IV Sălaj

Center

- Liga IV Alba
- Liga IV Brașov
- Liga IV Covasna
- Liga IV Harghita
- Liga IV Mureș
- Liga IV Sibiu

West

- Liga IV Arad
- Liga IV Caraș-Severin
- Liga IV Gorj
- Liga IV Hunedoara
- Liga IV Mehedinți
- Liga IV Timiș

South–West

- Liga IV Argeș
- Liga IV Dâmbovița
- Liga IV Dolj
- Liga IV Olt
- Liga IV Teleorman
- Liga IV Vâlcea

South

- Liga IV Bucharest
- Liga IV Călărași
- Liga IV Giurgiu
- Liga IV Ialomița
- Liga IV Ilfov
- Liga IV Prahova

South–East

- Liga IV Brăila
- Liga IV Buzău
- Liga IV Constanța
- Liga IV Galați
- Liga IV Tulcea
- Liga IV Vrancea
