= Liga IV Ilfov =

Fourth tier Romanian football league

- Founded: 1968
- Country: Romania
- Level on pyramid: 4
- Promotion to: Liga III
- Relegation to: Liga V Ilfov
- Domestic cup: Cupa României – County phase
- Current champions: Viitorul Corbeanca (3rd title) (2025–26)
- Most championships: IAB Pantelimon (4 titles)
- Website: frf-ajf.ro/ilfov
- Current: 2025–26 Liga IV Ilfov

Liga IV Ilfov is one of the regional football divisions of Liga IV, the fourth tier of the Romanian football league system, for clubs based in Ilfov County, and is organized by AJF Ilfov – Asociația Județeană de Fotbal (lit. 'County Football Association').

It is contested by a variable number of teams, depending on the number of teams relegated from Liga III, the number of teams promoted from Liga V Ilfov, and the teams that withdraw or enter the competition. The winner may or may not be promoted to Liga III, depending on the result of a promotion play-off contested against the winner of a neighboring county series.

== History ==
Following the administrative and territorial organization of the Romanian People's Republic, the football teams from today's Ilfov County played between 1950 and 1968 in the Bucharest Regional Championships.

In 1968, following the new administrative and territorial reorganization of the country, each county established its own football championship, integrating teams from the former regional championships as well as those that had previously competed in town and rayon level competitions. The freshly formed Ilfov County Championship was placed under the authority of the newly created Consiliul Județean pentru Educație Fizică și Sport (lit. 'County Council for Physical Education and Sports') in Ilfov County.

In 1981, Ilfov County was dissolved, and its territory was divided among the counties of Giurgiu, Dâmbovița, Ialomița, and Călărași, while the peri-urban area was administratively organized as Sectorul Agricol Ilfov (SAI), subordinated to the Municipality of Bucharest. Nevertheless, the football championship continued under the organization of the SAI Football Commission until the end of the 1991–92 season, after which the teams from Sectorul Agricol Ilfov were integrated into the competitions of the Municipality of Bucharest.

In 1997, with the re-establishment of Ilfov County, the competition was resumed under the name Divizia D, organized by AJF Ilfov – Asociația Județeană de Fotbal (lit. 'County Football Association'), and was renamed Liga IV in 2006.

== Promotion ==
The champions of each county association play against one another in a play-off to earn promotion to Liga III. Geographical criteria are taken into consideration when the play-offs are drawn. In total, there are 41 county champions plus the Bucharest municipal champion.

== List of champions ==
Ed.	Season	Winners
County Championship
1	1968–69	ICAB Arcuda
2	1969–70	ITA București
3	1970–71	Aurora Urziceni
4	1971–72	Sportul Ciorogârla
5	1972–73	Argeșul Mihăilești
6	1973–74	Avântul ICFT Urziceni
7	1974–75	Avântul ICFT Urziceni
8	1975–76	Viitorul Chirnogi
9	1976–77	Unirea Gârbovi
10	1977–78	Unirea Bolintin-Vale
11	1978–79	Viitorul Chirnogi
12	1979–80	Petrolul Roata de Jos
13	1980–81	Fulgerul Cernica
14	1981–82	Metalul Periș
15	1982–83	IUPS Chitila
16	1983–84	Metalul Periș
17	1984–85	Unirea Tricolor Balotești
18	1985–86	IAB Pantelimon
19	1986–87	IAB Pantelimon
20	1987–88	IAB Pantelimon
21	1988–89	Chiajna
22	1989–90	IAB Pantelimon
23	1990–91	Șoimii IEM Otopeni
24	1991–92	Inter Ciorogârla
–	1992–93	Not disputed
–	1993–94	Not disputed
–	1994–95	Not disputed
–	1995–96	Not disputed
–	1996–97	Not disputed
Divizia D
25	1997–98	Fulgerul Bragadiru
26	1998–99	Turistul Pantelimon
27	1999–00	Spicul Afumați
28	2000–01	Viscofil Popești-Leordeni
29	2001–02	Sportul Ciorogârla
30	2002–03	Mogoșoaia
31	2003–04	Mobexpert Ștefănești
32	2004–05	FC 1 Decembrie
33	2005–06	Dodu Berceni

Ed.	Season	Winners
Liga IV
34	2006–07	Viscofil Popești-Leordeni
35	2007–08	Corbeanca
36	2008–09	Viscofil Popești-Leordeni
37	2009–10	Afumați
38	2010–11	Ștefănești
39	2011–12	Progresul Cernica
40	2012–13	Corbeanca
46	2013–14	Voința Snagov
42	2014–15	Voluntari II
43	2015–16	Voința Crevedia
44	2016–17	Voința Crevedia
45	2017–18	Bragadiru
46	2018–19	Viitorul Pantelimon
47	2019–20	Viitorul Domnești
48	2020–21	Viitorul Domnești
49	2021–22	Glina
50	2022–23	LPS HD Clinceni
51	2023–24	Ștefănești
52	2024–25	Progresul Mogoșoaia
53	2025–26	Viitorul Corbeanca

== See also ==
=== Main Leagues ===
- Liga I
- Liga II
- Liga III
- Liga IV

=== County Leagues (Liga IV series) ===
North–East

- Liga IV Bacău
- Liga IV Botoșani
- Liga IV Iași
- Liga IV Neamț
- Liga IV Suceava
- Liga IV Vaslui

North–West

- Liga IV Bihor
- Liga IV Bistrița-Năsăud
- Liga IV Cluj
- Liga IV Maramureș
- Liga IV Satu Mare
- Liga IV Sălaj

Center

- Liga IV Alba
- Liga IV Brașov
- Liga IV Covasna
- Liga IV Harghita
- Liga IV Mureș
- Liga IV Sibiu

West

- Liga IV Arad
- Liga IV Caraș-Severin
- Liga IV Gorj
- Liga IV Hunedoara
- Liga IV Mehedinți
- Liga IV Timiș

South–West

- Liga IV Argeș
- Liga IV Dâmbovița
- Liga IV Dolj
- Liga IV Olt
- Liga IV Teleorman
- Liga IV Vâlcea

South

- Liga IV Bucharest
- Liga IV Călărași
- Liga IV Giurgiu
- Liga IV Ialomița
- Liga IV Ilfov
- Liga IV Prahova

South–East

- Liga IV Brăila
- Liga IV Buzău
- Liga IV Constanța
- Liga IV Galați
- Liga IV Tulcea
- Liga IV Vrancea
