= CS Progresul Mogoșoaia =

Progresul Mogoșoaia
- Full name: Club Sportiv Progresul Mogoșoaia
- Nickname: Mogoșoienii (The People from Mogoșoaia)
- Founded: 2022
- Ground: CNAF
- Capacity: 1,600
- Owner: Mogoșoaia Commune
- Head coach: Marcel Ploaie
- League: Liga III
- 2025–26: Liga III, Seria IV, 7th
Home colours	Away colours

Club Sportiv Progresul Mogoșoaia, commonly known as Progresul Mogoșoaia or simply Mogoșoaia, is a Romanian football club based in Mogoșoaia, Ilfov County. Founded in 2022, the club currently competes in Liga III, the third tier of the Romanian football league system, following its promotion at the end of the 2024–25 campaign.

== History ==
Progresul Mogoșoaia was founded in 2022 following a local council decision to establish a senior football team representing the commune. The club began its competitive activity in Liga V – Ilfov County, the fifth tier of Romanian football and the second at county level, winning the league at the end of the 2023–24 season and earning promotion.

The 2024–25 season marked the promotion to the national leagues, as Progresul won the county championship and the promotion play-off, defeating Gloria Fundeni, the Călărași County champions, over two legs: 7–1 away and 4–0 at home, securing promotion to Liga III.

== Stadium ==
Progresul Mogoșoaia plays its home matches at the Central Stadium of the Romanian National Football Centre, which has a capacity of 1,600 spectators. Located in Buftea, it is one of the main training and development facilities operated by the Romanian Football Federation.

== Honours ==
Liga IV – Ilfov County

- Winners (1): 2024–25

Liga V – Ilfov County

- Winners (1): 2023–24
