= ACS AXI Arena Adunații-Copăceni =

AXI Arena
- Full name: Asociația Clubul Sportiv AXI Arena
- Founded: 2020
- Ground: Mihăilești
- Capacity: 500
- Owner(s): Vasile-Cristinel Axinte; Alexandru Matei
- Chairman: Vasile-Cristinel Axinte
- Head coach: Vasile-Cristinel Axinte
- League: Liga III
- 2025–26: Liga III, Seria V, 9th
- Website: acsaxiarena.com

Asociația Clubul Sportiv AXI Arena, commonly known as AXI Arena, is a Romanian football club based in Adunații-Copăceni, Giurgiu County, which currently competes in Liga IIII, the third tier of the Romanian football league system.

== History ==
AXI Arena was founded in 2020 as a football academy aiming to develop young players, fielding junior teams in the Bucharest Municipality championships. In 2021, AXI registered a senior team in Liga V – Ilfov County, winning the title in the 2021–22 season.

However, as the club developed sports facilities in Mihăilești and Adunații-Copăceni, localities near Bucharest but part of Giurgiu County, the senior team was moved to the Giurgiu County Championships for the 2022–23 season, where it won Group B of the South Series in Liga V and earned promotion to Liga IV – Giurgiu County.

In the 2023–24 Liga IV – Giurgiu County campaign, AXI Arena competed in the South Series, finishing 1st in the regular season and 3rd after the championship play-off, seven points behind Bolintin Malu-Spart and one point behind local rivals Victoria Adunații-Copăceni. The team coached by Cristian Axinte, won the Giurgiu County phase of the Romanian Cup. The squad included Nedelcu, Zamfir, M. Gheorghe, Lamba, Ionică, Lassana, Rădăcină, C. Herea, Patrașcu, Neagu, Tudoroiu, Ciupitu, Crăciun, D. Nicolae, Fluerică, and Marcu.

In the following season, AXI Arena, strengthened by the arrival of two-time UEFA Champions League finalist and former Bayern Munich player Danijel Pranjić, won the Liga IV – Giurgiu County title and defeated FC Rovine, the Ialomița County champions, in the promotion play-off, 14–2 on aggregate (6–2 away and 8–0 at home), to earn promotion to Liga III. AXI also captured the 2024–25 Giurgiu County phase of the Romanian Cup, claiming the trophy for the second consecutive season. The squad led by Axinte included Nedelcu, Zamfir, Stan, Diaconeasa, Tutunaru, Năstase, Amet, Pătrașcu, Lassana, Scumpu, Rădăcină, Predescu, Tănăsescu, Imoung, Moldoveanu, Neacșu, C. Stanciu, and Mierlici.

== Honours ==
Liga IV – Giurgiu County

- Winners (1): 2024–25

Liga V – Giurgiu County

- Winners (1): 2022–23

Liga V – Ilfov County

- Winners (1): 2021–22

Cupa României – Giurgiu County

- Winners (2): 2023–24, 2024–25
