= Ciocănești, Călărași =

Ciocănești
- Commune
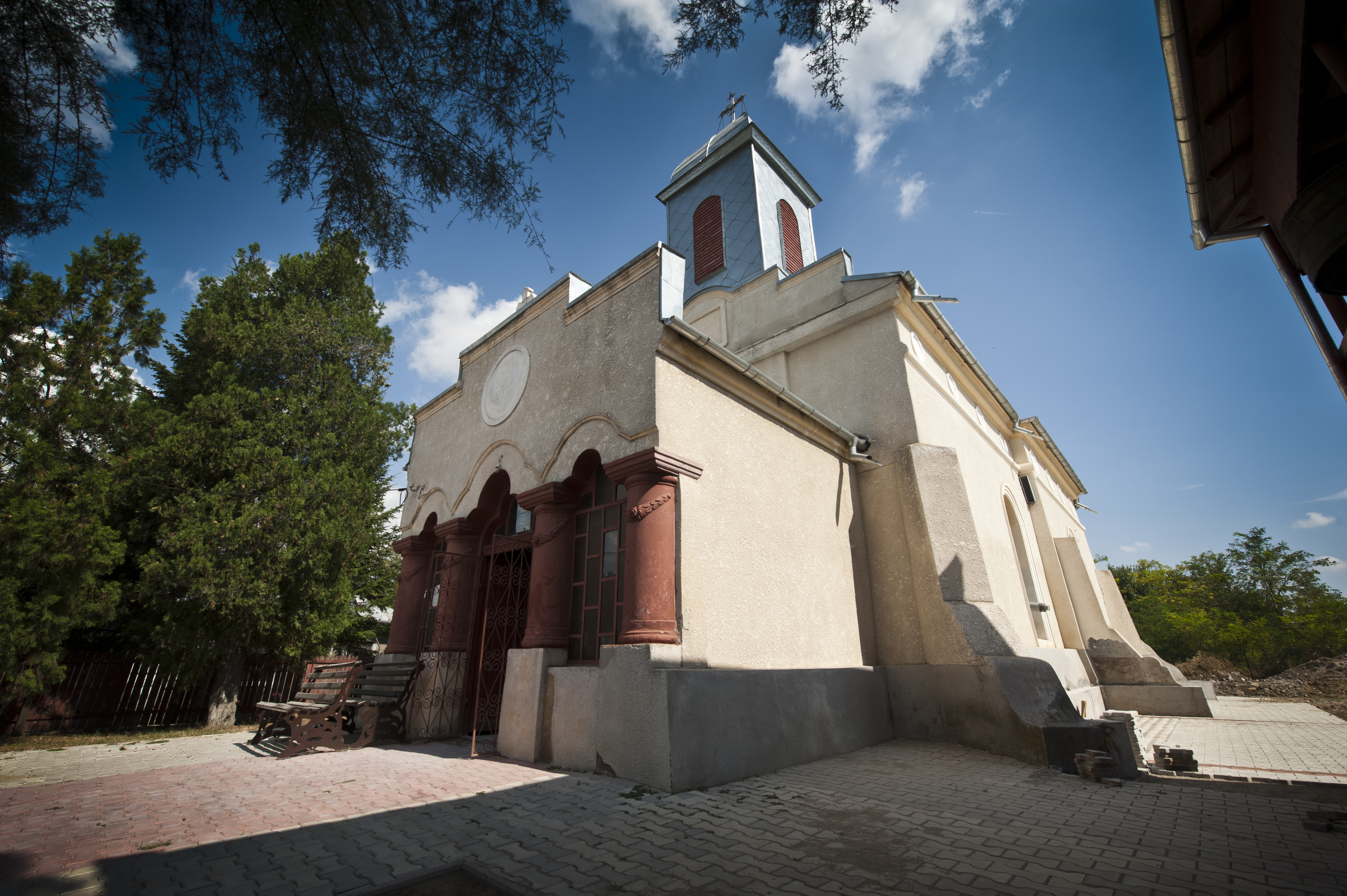
- Church in Ciocănești

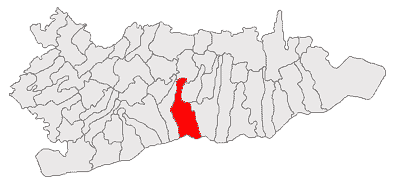
- Location in Călărași County

- Location in Romania
- Coordinates: 44°12′N 27°5′E
- Country: Romania
- County: Călărași

Government
  - Mayor (2024–2028): Dan Velicu (PSD)
- Area: 131.12 km^{2} (50.63 sq mi)
- Elevation: 19 m (62 ft)
- Population (2021-12-01): 3,804
  - Density: 29.01/km^{2} (75.14/sq mi)
- Time zone: UTC+02:00 (EET)
  - Summer (DST): UTC+03:00 (EEST)
- Postal code: 917035
- Area code: +(40) 242
- Vehicle reg.: CL
- Website: primaria-ciocanesti.ro

Ciocănești is a commune in Călărași County, Muntenia, Romania. It is composed of a single village, Ciocănești. The island Ostrovul Ciocănești lies in the proximity of Ciocănești on the Danube.

Historical population
Year	Pop.	±%
2002	4,998	—
2011	4,257	−14.8%
2021	3,804	−10.6%
Source: Census data
