= Liga IV Bucharest =

Fourth tier Romanian football league

- Founded: 1968
- Country: Romania
- Level on pyramid: 4
- Promotion to: Liga III
- Relegation to: Liga V Bucharest
- Domestic cup(s): Cupa României; Supercupa României
- Current champions: Omega Sport București (1st title) (2025–26)
- Most championships: Spic de Grâu București and Chitila (4 titles each)
- Website: amfb.ro
- Current: 2025–26 Liga IV Bucharest

Liga IV Bucharest is the municipal football division of Liga IV, the fourth tier of the Romanian football league system, for clubs based in Bucharest, and is organized by AMFB – Asociația Municipală de Fotbal București (lit. 'Municipal Football Association of Bucharest').

It is contested by a variable number of teams, depending on the number of teams relegated from Liga III, the number of teams promoted from Liga V Bucharest, and the teams that withdraw or enter the competition. The winner may or may not be promoted to Liga III, depending on the result of a promotion play-off contested against the winner of a neighboring county series.

== History ==
Football in the City and Region of Bucharest included over time, apart from the participating teams at the national level, a variable number of lower category teams, contained in different organizational and competitive formulas.

After 1948, following the administrative and territorial organization of the Romanian People's Republic, the football from the City of Bucharest and from Bucharest Region was governed by the municipal commission and the regional commission within the coordination forum for physical culture and sport.

In the Bucharest Region, football was organized into regional and district championships that comprised over time teams from nowadays Ilfov, Giurgiu, Ialomița, Teleorman and Călărași counties as from City of Bucharest. The Bucharest Regional Championship was disbanded in 1968 along with the new territorial reorganization of the country and the new competitive system in which each county has its own football championship. Starting that year, football in the Municipality of Bucharest was organized by the newly established Consiliul Municipal pentru Educație Fizică și Sport (lit. 'Municipal Council for Physical Education and Sports') in Bucharest.

In the City of Bucharest competitive formula was that of the municipal championship with teams from the largest Bucharest enterprises, in value categories called Honor, Promotion and Sector. A peak moment in this period, which ended after 1990, was the time interval between 1964 and 1976, when the destinies of football in the Capital were ensured by Prof. Traian Tomescu, and the number of teams, players, referees and coaches reached a record number, under the conditions of some competitions with two series at Honor Category, another four series at Promotion Category and one or two series for each sector of Bucharest.

After 1992, football in the Municipality of Bucharest was organized under the Asociația Municipală de Fotbal (lit. 'Municipal Football Association'), and the number of teams participating in competitions decreased due to poor economic and financial conditions. The competition was renamed Divizia C – Faza Municipală (Divizia C – Municipal Phase), became Divizia D in 1997, and has been known as Liga IV since 2006.

== Promotion ==
The champions of each county association play against one another in a play-off to earn promotion to Liga III. Geographical criteria are taken into consideration when the play-offs are drawn. In total, there are 41 county champions plus the Bucharest municipal champion.

== List of Champions ==
=== Bucharest Regional Championship ===
Ed.	Season	Winners
1	1951	Dinamo 8 București
2	1952	Spartac Giurgiu
3	1953	Dinamo Oltenița
4	1954	Flacăra București
5	1955	
6	1956	
7	1957–58	Oltul Turnu Măgurele
8	1958–59	CFR Roșiori
9	1959–60	CFR Roșiori
10	1960–61	Dunărea Giurgiu
11	1961–62	Progresul Alexandria
12	1962–63	Unirea Răcari
13	1963–64	Chimia Turnu Măgurele
14	1964–65	SN Oltenița
15	1965–66	Celuloza Călărași
16	1966–67	Chimia Turnu Măgurele
17	1967–68	Celuloza Călărași (East Series); Comerțul Alexandria (West Series)

=== Bucharest Municipal Championship ===
Ed.	Season	Winners
Municipal Championship
1	1952	Dinamo 8 București
2	1953	Progresul CPCS București
3	1954	Știința București
4	1955	Locomotiva MCF București
5	1956	
6	1957–58	
7	1958–59	Bumbacul București
8	1959–60	Academia Militară București
9	1960–61	Flacăra Roșie București
10	1961–62	Filaret București
11	1962–63	Flacăra Roșie București
12	1963–64	Metalul Floreasca
13	1964–65	Laromet București
14	1965–66	Dinamo Obor București
15	1966–67	TUG București
16	1967–68	Voința București
17	1968–69	Laromet București
18	1969–70	Constructorul București
19	1970–71	Dinamo Obor București
20	1971–72	UREMOAS București
21	1972–73	IOR București
22	1973–74	Automatica București
23	1974–75	ICSIM București
24	1975–76	Abatorul București
25	1976–77	Mecanica Fină București
26	1977–78	Vâscoza București
27	1978–79	Danubiana București
28	1979–80	Granitul București
29	1980–81	Dinamo Victoria București
30	1981–82	Vâscoza București
31	1982–83	URBIS București
32	1983–84	TMB București
33	1984–85	Voința București
34	1985–86	CFR BTA București
35	1986–87	IMGB București
36	1987–88	URBIS București
37	1988–89	Mecos București
38	1989–90	Voința București
39	1990–91	Calculatorul București
40	1991–92	Constructorul Feroviar București
Divizia C
41	1992–93	Viscofil București
42	1993–94	Aversa București
43	1994–95	Electromagnetica București
44	1995–96	Acumulatorul București
45	1996–97	Inter Gaz București
Divizia D
46	1997–98	Grivița București
47	1998–99	Aversa București
48	1999–00	Venus RGAB București
49	2000–01	Spic de Grâu București
50	2001–02	Spic de Grâu București
51	2002–03	Spic de Grâu București
52	2003–04	Chitila
53	2004–05	Sportul Studențesc București II
54	2005–06	Aversa București

Ed.	Season	Winners
Liga IV
55	2006–07	Comprest GIM București
56	2007–08	Progresul București II
57	2008–09	Comprest GIM București
58	2009–10	Spic de Grâu București
59	2010–11	Metaloglobus București
60	2011–12	Chitila
61	2012–13	Chitila
62	2013–14	Comprest GIM București
63	2014–15	Chitila
64	2015–16	Progresul București
65	2016–17	Progresul Spartac București
66	2017–18	Rapid București
67	2018–19	Carmen București
68	2019–20	Steaua București
–	2020–21	Not disputed (Note: Not disputed due to COVID-19 pandemic in Romania.)
69	2021–22	Dinamo București
70	2022–23	Daco-Getica București
71	2023–24	ACS FC Dinamo București
72	2024–25	Știința București
73	2025–26	Omega Sport București

== See also ==
=== Main Leagues ===
- Liga I
- Liga II
- Liga III
- Liga IV

=== County Leagues (Liga IV series) ===
North–East

- Liga IV Bacău
- Liga IV Botoșani
- Liga IV Iași
- Liga IV Neamț
- Liga IV Suceava
- Liga IV Vaslui

North–West

- Liga IV Bihor
- Liga IV Bistrița-Năsăud
- Liga IV Cluj
- Liga IV Maramureș
- Liga IV Satu Mare
- Liga IV Sălaj

Center

- Liga IV Alba
- Liga IV Brașov
- Liga IV Covasna
- Liga IV Harghita
- Liga IV Mureș
- Liga IV Sibiu

West

- Liga IV Arad
- Liga IV Caraș-Severin
- Liga IV Gorj
- Liga IV Hunedoara
- Liga IV Mehedinți
- Liga IV Timiș

South–West

- Liga IV Argeș
- Liga IV Dâmbovița
- Liga IV Dolj
- Liga IV Olt
- Liga IV Teleorman
- Liga IV Vâlcea

South

- Liga IV Bucharest
- Liga IV Călărași
- Liga IV Giurgiu
- Liga IV Ialomița
- Liga IV Ilfov
- Liga IV Prahova

South–East

- Liga IV Brăila
- Liga IV Buzău
- Liga IV Constanța
- Liga IV Galați
- Liga IV Tulcea
- Liga IV Vrancea
