= ACS Omega Sport București =

Omega Sport București
- Full name: Asociația Club Sportiv Omega Sport București
- Nicknames: Bucureștenii (The Bucharest people)
- Short name: Omega Sport
- Founded: 2024
- Stadium: Comunal
- Capacity: 200
- Chairman: Alin Mihai
- Manager: Marcel Abăluță
- League: Liga III
- 2025–26: Liga IV, Bucharest, 1st (promoted via play-offs)
- Website: omegasport.ro
Home colours	Away colours

Asociația Club Sportiv Omega Sport București, also known as Omega Sport București, or just Omega Sport is a Romanian football club based in București, Romania, which currently plays in Liga III, the third tier of Romanian football.

== History ==
Omega Sport was founded in 2024 and enrolled directly in Liga IV. In the 2024–25 season, they managed to finish in second place, behind Știința București by 4 points.

In the 2025–26 season, the club has managed to win the league, and finishing ahead of rivals such as Știința București and Daco-Getica București, and managing to promote to Liga III after winning 6–1 on aggregate against Spicul Vâlcelele, Călărași County champions.

== Honours ==
Liga IV – București

- Winners (1): 2025–26
- Runners-up (1): 2024–25
