= 2025–26 Liga IV =

84th season of Romanian football league

Liga IV
- Season: 2025–26

The 2025–26 Liga IV was the 84th season of Liga IV and the 58th since the 1968 administrative and territorial reorganization of the country, representing the fourth tier of the Romanian football league system. The champions of each county association played against one from a neighbouring county in a play-off for promotion to Liga III.

The counties were divided into seven regions, each consisting of six counties, and the draw take place on 11 February 2026.

== County leagues ==
North–East

- Bacău (BC)
- Botoșani (BT)
- Iași (IS)
- Neamț (NT)
- Suceava (SV)
- Vaslui (VS)

North–West

- Bihor (BH)
- Bistrița-Năsăud (BN)
- Cluj (CJ)
- Maramureș (MM)
- Satu Mare (SM)
- Sălaj (SJ)

Center

- Alba (AB)
- Brașov (BV)
- Covasna (CV)
- Harghita (HR)
- Mureș (MS)
- Sibiu (SB)

West

- Arad (AR)
- Caraș-Severin (CS)
- Gorj (GJ)
- Hunedoara (HD)
- Mehedinți (MH)
- Timiș (TM)

South–West

- Argeș (AG)
- Dâmbovița (DB)
- Dolj (DJ)
- Olt (OT)
- Teleorman (TR)
- Vâlcea (VL)

South

- Bucharest (B)
- Călărași (CL)
- Giurgiu (GR)
- Ialomița (IL)
- Ilfov (IF)
- Prahova (PH)

South–East

- Brăila (BR)
- Buzău (BZ)
- Constanța (CT)
- Galați (GL)
- Tulcea (TL)
- Vrancea (VN)

== Promotion play-off ==
The matches are scheduled to be played on 20 and 27 June 2026.

Team 1	Agg.	Team 2	1st leg	2nd leg
Region 1 (North-East)				
Unirea Curtești (BT)	0–8	(SV) Bradul Putna	0–4	0–4
Cimentul Bicaz (NT)	3–6	(IS) Pașcani	2–3	1–3
Hușana Huși (VS)	w/o (Note: Negri, Victoria Adunații-Copăceni and Victoria Gologanu do not meet the conditions for participation in the promotion play-off to Liga III.)	(BC) Negri	w/o	w/o
Region 2 (North-West)				
Minerul Rodna (BN)	2–6	(BH) TSA Oradea	0–3	2–3
Talna Orașu Nou (SM)	8–7	(SJ) Barcău Nușfalău	3–4	5–3
Victoria Viișoara (CJ)	2–3	(MM) Academica Recea	2–1	0–2
Region 3 (Center)				
Sânsimion (HR)	2–3	(CV) Carpați Covasna	1–2	1–1
Agnita (SB)	0–3	(BV) Corona Brașov	0–1	0–2
Transilvania Târgu Mureș (MS)	1–5	(AB) Viitorul Sântimbru	1–3	0–2
Region 4 (West)				
Negomir (GJ)	1–3	(CS) Nera Bogodinț	1–2	0–1
Athletico Vinga (AR)	2–4	(HD) Deva	0–1	2–3
Sânandrei Carani (TM)	2–3	(MH) Drobeta-Turnu Severin	1–2	1–1
Region 5 (South-West)				
Viitorul Horezu (VL)	1–2	(TR) Astra Plosca	0–2	1–0
Recolta Gura Șuții (DB)	6–9	(OT) Lupii Profa	2–7	4–2
Petrolul Hârtiești (AG)	3–1	(DJ) Avântul Pielești	1–1	2–0
Region 6 (South)				
Bărăganul Ciulnița (IL)	1–2	(IF) Viitorul Corbeanca	1–2	0–0
Progresul Drăgănești (PH)	w/o	(GR) Victoria Adunații-Copăceni	w/o	w/o
Spicul Vâlcelele (CL)	1–6	(B) Omega Sport București	1–1	0–5
Region 7 (South-East)				
Petrolul Berca (BZ)	11–1	(TL) Pescărușul Sarichioi	5–0	6–1
Victoria Gologanu (VN)	w/o	(GL) Gloria Ivești	w/o	w/o
Portul Constanța (CT)	4–0	(BR) Făurei	2–0	2–0

== League standings ==
=== Alba County ===
Team changes from the previous season

- Hidro Mecanica Șugag 1984 achieved promotion to Liga III.
- Sportul Câmpeni (Series I winners) and ACS Oiejdea (Series III winners) were promoted from Liga V Alba.
- Limbenii Limba (15th place) was relegated to Liga V Alba.
- VCG Vințu de Jos (Series II winners) declined promotion from Liga V Alba.
- Voința Stremț, Energia Săsciori and Academia Șona withdrew.
- CS Zlatna (14th place) was spared from relegation.
- ȘF Valea Frumoasei was admitted upon request.

Pos	Team	Pld	W	D	L	GF	GA	GD	Pts	Qualification or relegation
1	Viitorul Sântimbru (C, Q)	23	19	2	2	88	19	+69	59	Qualification to promotion play-off
2	Industria Galda	23	18	3	2	87	21	+66	57	
3	Inter Unirea	23	16	4	3	66	25	+41	52	
4	Ocna Mureș	23	15	2	6	71	30	+41	47	
5	Performanța Ighiu	23	11	5	7	45	30	+15	38 (Note: Performanța Ighiu are ahead of Spicul Daia Romană on head-to-head points: Spicul Daia Romană 0–4 Performanța Ighiu, Performanța Ighiu 0–2 Spicul Daia Romană.)	
6	Spicul Daia Romană	23	11	5	7	56	33	+23	38	
7	Valea Frumoasei	23	11	4	8	46	34	+12	37	
8	Zlatna	23	5	5	13	29	60	−31	20	
9	Fortuna Lunca Mureșului	23	5	4	14	43	71	−28	19	
10	Micești	23	5	1	17	27	77	−50	16	
11	Oiejdea	23	4	2	17	34	95	−61	14	
12	Sportul Câmpeni (R)	23	2	3	18	23	87	−64	9	Relegation to Liga V Alba
13	Viitorul Vama Seacă (Note: Viitorul Vama Seacă withdrew after the first half of the season and lost all matches in the second half 0–3. At the time, they were ranked 12th, with 2 wins, 0 draws, 10 losses, a 17–50 goals, and 6 points.) (D)	12	2	0	10	17	50	−33	6	Withdrew

Rules for classification: 1) Points; 2) Head-to-head points; 3) Head-to-head goal difference; 4) Head-to-head goals scored; 5) Head-to-head away goals scored; 6) Goal difference; 7) Goals scored.
(C) Champions; (D) Disqualified; (Q) Qualified for the phase indicated; (R) Relegated

=== Arad County ===
Team changes from the previous season

- Unirea Sântana achieved promotion to Liga III.
- Șiriana Șiria (Series A runners-up) (Note: Șiriana Șiria was promoted instead of Unirea Șeitin (Series A winners), who declined promotion.) and Olimpia Bocsig (Series C winners) were promoted from Liga V Arad.
- Victoria Zăbrani (14th place; withdrew) relegated to Liga V Arad.
- Înfrățirea Iratoșu (Series B winners) declined promotion from Liga V Arad.
- CS Beliu withdrew.

Pos	Team	Pld	W	D	L	GF	GA	GD	Pts	Qualification or relegation
1	Athletico Vinga (C, Q)	24	21	2	1	76	16	+60	65	Qualification to promotion play-off
2	Victoria Felnac	24	17	2	5	74	30	+44	53	
3	Olimpia Bocsig	24	15	3	6	76	54	+22	48	
4	Podgoria Pâncota	24	13	4	7	42	22	+20	43	
5	Socodor	24	12	6	6	60	39	+21	42	
6	Frontiera Curtici	24	11	3	10	62	45	+17	36 (Note: Frontiera Curtici are ahead of Vladimirescu on head-to-head points: Frontiera Curtici 2–0 Vladimirescu, Vladimirescu 3–4 Frontiera Curtici.)	
7	Vladimirescu	24	10	6	8	56	41	+15	36	
8	Șoimii Șimand	24	10	5	9	42	29	+13	35	
9	Șiriana Șiria	24	8	4	12	37	53	−16	28	
10	Național Sebiș	24	7	6	11	50	50	0	27	
11	Voința Macea	24	4	5	15	33	75	−42	17	
12	Progresul Pecica II	24	2	2	20	26	88	−62	8	
13	Victoria Nădlac (Note: Victoria Nădlac withdrew after the first half of the season and lost all matches in the second half 0–3. At the time, they were ranked 12th, with 2 wins, 0 draws, 10 losses, a 13–69 goals, and 6 points.) (D)	24	2	0	22	13	105	−92	6	Withdrew

Source: AJF Arad
Rules for classification: 1) Points; 2) Head-to-head points; 3) Head-to-head goal difference; 4) Head-to-head goals scored; 5) Head-to-head away goals scored; 6) Goal difference; 7) Goals scored.
(C) Champions; (D) Disqualified; (Q) Qualified for the phase indicated

=== Argeș County ===
Team changes from the previous season

- Petrolul Hârtiești (North Series winners) and Albota 2012 (Center Series winners) were promoted from Liga V Argeș.
- Unirea Hârsești (South Series winners) declined promotion from Liga V Argeș.
- Victoria Buzoești and Speed Academy Pitești II withdrew.
- Budeasa Academie and Star Mioveni were admitted upon request.

Pos	Team	Pld	W	D	L	GF	GA	GD	Pts	Qualification or relegation (Note: Teams are split into two groups (play-off and play-out) after each have played 18 matches.)
1	Petrolul Hârtiești (C, Q)	24	20	1	3	74	29	+45	61	Qualification to promotion play-off
2	Budeasa Academie	24	14	0	10	65	48	+17	42	
3	Pitești 2008	24	13	2	9	60	45	+15	41	
4	Albota 2012	24	11	2	11	60	66	−6	35	
5	Domnești	23	14	1	8	68	36	+32	43	
6	Star Mioveni	23	11	4	8	61	37	+24	37	
7	Zimbrii Lerești	23	11	3	9	52	46	+6	36	
8	Suseni	23	7	2	14	40	70	−30	23	
9	Young Boys Topoloveni	23	6	1	16	36	55	−19	19	
10	DLR Pitești	23	1	2	20	25	109	−84	5	

Rules for classification: 1) Points; 2) Head-to-head points; 3) Head-to-head goal difference; 4) Head-to-head goals scored; 5) Head-to-head away goals scored; 6) Goal difference; 7) Goals scored.
(C) Champions; (Q) Qualified for the phase indicated

=== Bacău County ===
The Liga IV Bacău was played in a single round-robin regular season featuring twenty-two teams, followed by a championship play-off for the top four teams and a play-out for the remaining eighteen teams, split into two groups of nine. Teams will enter these stages with all points and goal difference from the regular season carried over. The bottom four teams from each play-out group will be relegated.

Team changes from the previous season

- Viitorul Berești-Tazlău withdrew in the previous season.
- Sportul Horgești and Recolta Urechești were admitted upon request.

Pos	Team	Pld	W	D	L	GF	GA	GD	Pts	Qualification
1	Bârsănești	20	17	2	1	78	18	+60	53 (Note: Bârsănești are ahead of Negri on head-to-head points: Bârsănești 6–1 Negri.)	Qualification to championship play-off
2	Negri	20	17	2	1	87	31	+56	53	Qualification to championship play-off
3	Bubu	20	16	2	2	101	10	+91	50	Qualification to championship play-off
4	Vulturul Măgirești	20	14	2	4	76	27	+49	44 (Note: Vulturul Măgirești are ahead of Viitorul Nicolae Bălcescu on head-to-head points: Vulturul Măgirești 5–1 Viitorul Nicolae Bălcescu.)	Qualification to championship play-off
5	Viitorul Nicolae Bălcescu	20	13	5	2	60	28	+32	44	Qualification to championship play-out Group A
6	Voința Bacău	20	12	5	3	47	21	+26	41	Qualification to championship play-out Group A
7	Gloria Zemeș	20	11	3	6	63	44	+19	36	Qualification to championship play-out Group A
8	Dofteana	20	10	3	7	48	43	+5	33 (Note: Dofteana are ahead of Măgura Târgu Ocna on head-to-head points: Dofteana 2–1 Măgura Târgu Ocna.)	Qualification to championship play-out Group B
9	Măgura Târgu Ocna	20	10	3	7	61	41	+20	33	Qualification to championship play-out Group B
10	Moinești	20	10	1	9	58	35	+23	31	Qualification to championship play-out Group A
11	Măgura Cașin	20	8	3	9	51	45	+6	27	Qualification to championship play-out Group A
12	Sportul Horgești	20	6	7	7	52	60	−8	25	Qualification to championship play-out Group B
13	Uzu Dărmănești	20	7	3	10	32	42	−10	24	Qualification to championship play-out Group B
14	Faraoani	20	7	2	11	36	49	−13	23	Qualification to championship play-out Group A
15	Unirea Bacău	20	6	4	10	38	53	−15	22	Qualification to championship play-out Group A
16	Bradul Mănăstirea Cașin	20	5	3	12	32	50	−18	18 (Note: Bradul Mănăstirea Cașin are ahead of Bamirom Dumbrăveni on goal difference.)	Qualification to championship play-out Group B
17	Bamirom Dumbrăveni (Note: Bamirom Dumbrăveni withdrew after 15 rounds and lost all remaining matches 0–3.)	20	5	3	12	31	52	−21	18	Qualification to championship play-out Group B
18	Recolta Urechești	20	4	0	16	19	96	−77	12	Qualification to championship play-out Group A
19	Flamura Roșie Sascut	20	2	0	18	16	94	−78	6	Qualification to championship play-out Group A
20	Viitorul Dămienești	20	1	2	17	24	109	−85	5	Qualification to championship play-out Group B
21	Gauss Bacău	20	1	1	18	14	76	−62	4	Qualification to championship play-out Group B
22	Siretu Săucești (Note: Siretu Săucești withdrew after the first round, and its results were canceled.) (D)	0	0	0	0	0	0	0	0	Withdrew

Rules for classification: 1) Points; 2) Head-to-head points; 3) Head-to-head goal difference; 4) Head-to-head goals scored; 5) Head-to-head away goals scored; 6) Goal difference; 7) Goals scored.
(D) Disqualified
Notes:

Championship play-off

Pos	Team	Pld	W	D	L	GF	GA	GD	Pts	Qualification
1	Negri (C, Q)	6	4	1	1	107	41	+66	66	Qualification to promotion play-off
2	Bubu	6	4	1	1	116	13	+103	63	
3	Bârsănești	6	2	0	4	89	34	+55	59	
4	Vulturul Măgirești	6	1	0	5	84	52	+32	47	

Rules for classification: 1) Points; 2) Points in the regular season; 3) Head-to-head points; 4) Head-to-head goal difference; 5) Head-to-head goals scored;
6) Head-to-head away goals scored; 7) Goal difference (regular season + play off); 8) Goals scored (regular season + play off).
(C) Champions; (Q) Qualified for the phase indicated

Championship play-out
Group A

Pos	Team	Pld	W	D	L	GF	GA	GD	Pts	Relegation
1	Viitorul Nicolae Bălcescu	6	4	0	2	71	37	+34	56	
2	Voința Bacău	6	3	0	3	58	31	+27	50	
3	Gloria Zemeș	6	2	2	2	72	53	+19	44	
4	Moinești	6	3	2	1	72	42	+30	42 (Note: Moinești are ahead of Măgura Cașin on regular season points.)	
5	Măgura Cașin	6	5	0	1	67	52	+15	42	
6	Faraoani (R)	6	1	1	4	44	67	−23	27	Relegation to Liga V Bacău
7	Recolta Urechești (R)	6	0	1	5	26	112	−86	13	Relegation to Liga V Bacău
8	Unirea Bacău (Note: Unirea Bacău and Flamura Roșie Sascut withdrew before the second stage.) (D)	0	0	0	0	0	0	0	0	Withdrew
9	Flamura Roșie Sascut (D)	0	0	0	0	0	0	0	0	Withdrew

Rules for classification: 1) Points; 2) Points in the regular season; 3) Head-to-head points; 4) Head-to-head goal difference; 5) Head-to-head goals scored;6) Head-to-head away goals scored; 7) Goal difference (regular season + play out); 8) Goals scored (regular season + play out).
(D) Disqualified; (R) Relegated
Notes:

Group B

Pos	Team	Pld	W	D	L	GF	GA	GD	Pts	Relegation
1	Dofteana	6	4	1	1	69	51	+18	46	
2	Măgura Târgu Ocna	6	3	1	2	80	56	+24	43	
3	Uzu Dărmănești	6	4	1	1	44	46	−2	37	
4	Sportul Horgești	6	3	2	1	68	70	−2	36	
5	Bradul Mănăstirea Cașin	6	0	2	4	41	68	−27	20	
6	Gauss Bacău (R)	6	2	0	4	28	98	−70	10	Relegation to Liga V Bacău
7	Viitorul Dămienești (R)	6	1	1	4	39	138	−99	9	Relegation to Liga V Bacău
8	Bamirom Dumbrăveni (Note: Bamirom Dumbrăveni and Siretu Săucești withdrew in the first stage.) (D)	0	0	0	0	0	0	0	0	Withdrew
9	Siretu Săucești (D)	0	0	0	0	0	0	0	0	Withdrew

Rules for classification: 1) Points; 2) Points in the regular season; 3) Head-to-head points; 4) Head-to-head goal difference; 5) Head-to-head goals scored; 6) Head-to-head away goals scored; 7) Goal difference (regular season + play out); 8) Goals scored (regular season + play out).
(D) Disqualified; (R) Relegated

=== Bihor County ===
Team changes from the previous season

- Bihorul Beiuș achieved promotion to Liga III.
- AS Olcea (16th place) was relegated to Liga V Bihor.
- Nojorid Livada (runners-up) was promoted from Liga V Bihor.
- Zorile Buntești (winners) declined promotion from Liga V Bihor.
- CSC Hidișelu de Sus withdrew.
- Izvorul Cociuba Mare was spared from relegation.

Pos	Team	Pld	W	D	L	GF	GA	GD	Pts	Qualification
1	TSA Oradea	13	12	1	0	74	6	+68	37	Qualification to championship play-off
2	CA Oradea	13	12	0	1	45	10	+35	36	Qualification to championship play-off
3	Oșorhei	13	11	1	1	33	7	+26	34	Qualification to championship play-off
4	Olimpia Salonta	13	10	0	3	32	11	+21	30	Qualification to championship play-off
5	Ștei	13	7	2	4	32	19	+13	23	Qualification to championship play-off
6	Universitatea Oradea	13	7	1	5	38	17	+21	22	Qualification to championship play-off
7	Crișul Aleșd	13	7	0	6	23	32	−9	21	Qualification to championship play-out
8	Foresta Tileagd	13	6	0	7	28	18	+10	18	Qualification to championship play-out
9	Izvorul Cociuba Mare	13	4	0	9	24	45	−21	12	Qualification to championship play-out
10	Vadu Crișului	13	3	2	8	19	32	−13	11	Qualification to championship play-out
11	Unirea Valea lui Mihai	13	2	2	9	22	48	−26	8	Qualification to championship play-out
12	Victoria Avram Iancu	13	2	1	10	12	68	−56	7	Qualification to championship play-out
13	Nojorid-Livada	13	1	2	10	14	48	−34	5	Qualification to championship play-out
14	Voința Cheresig	13	0	2	11	15	50	−35	2	Qualification to championship play-out

Rules for classification: 1) Points; 2) Head-to-head points; 3) Head-to-head goal difference; 4) Head-to-head goals scored; 5) Head-to-head away goals scored; 6) Goal difference; 7) Goals scored.

Championship play-off

Pos	Team	Pld	W	D	L	GF	GA	GD	Pts	Qualification
1	TSA Oradea (C, Q)	15	11	3	1	51	19	+32	73	Qualification to promotion play-off
2	CA Oradea	15	10	1	4	46	18	+28	67	
3	Oșorhei	15	10	2	3	37	24	+13	66	
4	Olimpia Salonta	15	4	2	9	22	44	−22	44	
5	Universitatea Oradea	15	4	2	9	25	39	−14	36	
6	Ștei	15	1	0	14	17	54	−37	26	

Rules for classification: 1) Points; 2) Head-to-head points; 3) Head-to-head goal difference; 4) Head-to-head goals scored;
5) Head-to-head away goals scored; 6) Goal difference; 7) Goals scored.
(C) Champions; (Q) Qualified for the phase indicated

Championship play-out

Pos	Team	Pld	W	D	L	GF	GA	GD	Pts	Relegation
7	Crișul Aleșd	14	7	4	3	26	20	+6	46	
8	Foresta Tileagd	14	7	1	6	37	27	+10	40	
9	Unirea Valea lui Mihai	14	9	3	2	33	14	+19	38	
10	Izvorul Cociuba Mare	14	6	2	6	30	35	−5	32	
11	Vadu Crișului	14	5	3	6	25	22	+3	29	
12	Victoria Avram Iancu	14	4	5	5	35	35	0	24	
13	Nojorid-Livada (R)	14	5	1	8	23	35	−12	21	Relegation to Liga V Bihor
14	Voința Cheresig (R)	14	3	1	10	23	44	−21	12	Relegation to Liga V Bihor

Rules for classification: 1) Points; 2) Head-to-head points; 3) Head-to-head goal difference; 4) Head-to-head goals scored;
5) Head-to-head away goals scored; 6) Goal difference; 7) Goals scored.
(R) Relegated

=== Bistrița-Năsăud County ===
Team changes from the previous season

- Voința Mărișelu (winners) and CS Valea Bârgăului (runners-up) declined promotion from Liga V Bistrița-Năsăud.
- Prosomeș Feldru (11th place) and Real Teaca (12th place) were spared from relegation.
- Viticola Lechința withdrew.
- Sportul Beclean was admitted upon request.

Pos	Team	Pld	W	D	L	GF	GA	GD	Pts	Qualification
1	Silvicultorul Maieru	11	10	0	1	47	13	+34	30	Qualification to championship play-off
2	Minerul Rodna	11	9	1	1	47	5	+42	28	Qualification to championship play-off
3	Atletico Monor	11	8	2	1	41	12	+29	26	Qualification to championship play-off
4	Hebe Sângeorz-Băi	11	8	0	3	30	13	+17	24	Qualification to championship play-off
5	Viitorul Livezile	11	7	2	2	46	7	+39	23	Qualification to championship play-off
6	Dinamo Uriu	11	4	1	6	21	22	−1	13	Qualification to championship play-off
7	Progresul Năsăud	11	3	2	6	21	30	−9	11	Qualification to championship play-out
8	Prosomeș Feldru	11	3	1	7	15	39	−24	10	Qualification to championship play-out
9	Eciro Forest Telciu	11	2	3	6	13	32	−19	9	Qualification to championship play-out
10	Sportul Beclean	11	2	1	8	16	32	−16	7 (Note: Sportul Beclean are ahead of Săgeata Dumbrăvița on head-to-head points: Sportul Beclean 3–0 Săgeata Dumbrăvița.)	Qualification to championship play-out
11	Săgeata Dumbrăvița	11	2	1	8	17	50	−33	7	Qualification to championship play-out
12	Real Teaca	11	1	0	10	11	70	−59	3	Qualification to championship play-out

Rules for classification: 1) Points; 2) Head-to-head points; 3) Head-to-head goal difference; 4) Head-to-head goals scored; 5) Head-to-head away goals scored; 6) Goal difference; 7) Goals scored.
Notes:

Championship play-off

Pos	Team	Pld	W	D	L	GF	GA	GD	Pts	Qualification
1	Minerul Rodna (C, Q)	8	4	2	2	20	15	+5	42	Qualification to promotion play-off
2	Silvicultorul Maieru	8	3	2	3	20	25	−5	41	
3	Hebe Sângeorz-Băi	8	4	1	3	17	15	+2	37	
4	Viitorul Livezile	8	3	2	3	22	17	+5	34	
5	Atletico Monor	8	2	1	5	10	17	−7	33	

Rules for classification: 1) Points; 2) Points in the regular season; 3) Head-to-head points; 4) Head-to-head goal difference; 5) Head-to-head goals scored;
6) Head-to-head away goals scored; 7) Goal difference (regular season + play-off); 8) Goals scored (regular season + play-off); 9) Play-off.
(C) Champions; (Q) Qualified for the phase indicated

Championship play-out

Pos	Team	Pld	W	D	L	GF	GA	GD	Pts	Relegation
6	Progresul Năsăud	10	7	0	3	22	13	+9	32	
7	Eciro Forest Telciu	10	5	1	4	18	19	−1	25	
8	Prosomeș Feldru	10	4	1	5	15	16	−1	23	
9	Real Teaca	10	6	0	4	20	13	+7	21	
10	Săgeata Dumbrăvița	10	4	1	5	14	17	−3	20	
11	Sportul Beclean (R)	10	2	1	7	11	22	−11	14	Relegation to Liga V Bistrița-Năsăud
12	Dinamo Uriu (Note: Dinamo Uriu, which had initially qualified for the championship play-off, withdrew before the start of the second stage.) (D)	0	0	0	0	0	0	0	0	Withdrew

Rules for classification: 1) Points; 2) Points in the regular season; 3) Head-to-head points; 4) Head-to-head goal difference; 5) Head-to-head goals scored;
6) Head-to-head away goals scored; 7) Goal difference (regular season + play-out); 8) Goals scored (regular season + play-out); 9) Play-out.
(D) Disqualified; (R) Relegated

=== Botoșani County ===
Team changes from the previous season

- Viitorul Gorbănești (13th place) and Zorile Havârna (14th place) were relegated to Liga V Botoșani.
- Speranța Dumbrăvița (North Series runners-up) and Pro Vorona (South Series runners-up) were promoted from Liga V Botoșani. (Note: Inter Viișoara (North Series winners) and Cristalul Dorohoi (South Series winners) declined promotion.)

Pos	Team	Pld	W	D	L	GF	GA	GD	Pts	Qualification or relegation
1	Unirea Curtești (C, Q)	24	20	2	2	67	24	+43	62	Qualification to promotion play-off
2	Bucecea	24	19	3	2	80	16	+64	60	
3	Nord Păltiniș	24	16	0	8	77	38	+39	48	
4	Sulița	24	14	3	7	78	44	+34	45	
5	Pro Vorona	24	14	2	8	50	41	+9	44	
6	Prosport Gloria Vârfu Câmpului	24	12	2	10	70	55	+15	38	
7	Sportivul Trușești	24	9	5	10	46	37	+9	32	
8	Partizanul Tudora	24	10	3	11	64	57	+7	30 (Note: Partizanul Tudora deducted 3 points.)	
9	Inter Dorohoi	24	8	5	11	59	54	+5	29	
10	Viitorul Borzești	24	7	3	14	40	56	−16	24	
11	Sportul Flămânzi	24	3	4	17	33	83	−50	13	
12	Voința Șendriceni	24	3	3	18	19	71	−52	12	
13	Speranța Dumbrăvița (R)	24	2	3	19	32	139	−107	9	Relegation to Liga V Botoșani
14	Epureni (Note: Epureni withdrew after 6 rounds, and all their results were canceled. At the time, they were ranked 12th with 1 win, 0 draws, 5 losses, 16–21 goals, and 3 points.) (D)	0	0	0	0	0	0	0	0	Withdrew

Rules for classification: 1) Points; 2) Head-to-head points; 3) Head-to-head goal difference; 4) Head-to-head goals scored; 5) Head-to-head away goals scored; 6) Goal difference; 7) Goals scored.
(C) Champions; (D) Disqualified; (Q) Qualified for the phase indicated; (R) Relegated

=== Brașov County ===
Team changes from the previous season

- CSM Săcele achieved promotion to Liga III.
- CSM Codlea was relegated from Liga III and subsequently renamed Măgura Codlea.
- SR Brașov was excluded from Liga III and enrolled upon request.
- Olimpic Cetate Râșnov and Ciucaș Tărlungeni were relegated from Liga III but did not enter the competition.
- FS Voila (14th place; withdrew) and ACS Vulcan 2008 (15th place; withdrew) were relegated to Liga V Brașov.
- Colțea Brașov (Brașov Zone winners) was promoted from Liga V Brașov.
- Clăbucet Nord Sebeș (Series I Făgăraș Zone winners) and Viitorul Recea (Series II Făgăraș Zone winners) declined promotion from Liga V Brașov.
- Bucegi Moieciu and Olimpic Zărnești II withdrew.
- ACS Prejmer was admitted upon request.

Pos	Team	Pld	W	D	L	GF	GA	GD	Pts	Qualification or relegation
1	Corona Brașov (C, Q)	24	23	1	0	120	9	+111	70	Qualification to promotion play-off
2	Măgura Codlea	24	18	4	2	88	22	+66	58	
3	Teutonii Ghimbav	24	17	1	6	87	31	+56	52	
4	Făgăraș	24	15	1	8	60	38	+22	46	
5	Inter Cristian	24	13	4	7	79	48	+31	43	
6	Aripile Brașov	24	12	0	12	60	53	+7	36	
7	SR Brașov	24	10	3	11	47	44	+3	33	
8	Chimia Orașul Victoria	24	8	3	13	47	66	−19	27	
9	Prejmer	24	8	2	14	48	59	−11	26	
10	Unirea Hărman	24	8	0	16	53	87	−34	24	
11	Colțea Brașov	24	6	3	15	38	53	−15	21	
12	Hoghiz	24	5	2	17	31	106	−75	17	
13	Hălchiu (R)	24	1	0	23	16	158	−142	3	Relegation to Liga V Brașov
14	Carpați Berivoi (Note: Carpați Berivoi withdrew after 8 rounds and all its results were canceled. At the time, they were ranked 14th with 0 win, 0 draws, 9 losses, 4–80 goals, and 0 points.) (D)	0	0	0	0	0	0	0	0	Withdrew

Rules for classification: 1) Points; 2) Head-to-head points; 3) Head-to-head goal difference; 4) Head-to-head goals scored; 5) Head-to-head away goals scored; 6) Goal difference; 7) Goals scored.
(C) Champions; (D) Disqualified; (Q) Qualified for the phase indicated; (R) Relegated

=== Brăila County ===
Team changes from the previous season

- Victoria Traian achieved promotion to Liga III.
- Luceafărul Brăila (12th place) was relegated to Liga V Brăila.
- Romgal Romanu (Series I winners) and Viitorul Cireșu (Series II winners) declined promotion from Liga V Brăila.
- Sportul Chiscani and Tricolorul Lanurile withdrew.
- Tricolorul Viziru was admitted upon request.

Pos	Team	Pld	W	D	L	GF	GA	GD	Pts	Qualification
1	Daous Dava 2018 Brăila	16	14	1	1	66	19	+47	43	Qualification to championship play-off
2	Făurei	16	12	1	3	62	19	+43	37	Qualification to championship play-off
3	Viitorul Ianca	16	9	2	5	57	21	+36	29	Qualification to championship play-off
4	Șoimii Tudor Vladimirescu	16	9	1	6	45	36	+9	28	Qualification to championship play-off
5	Viitorul Galbenu	16	9	0	7	36	39	−3	27	Qualification to championship play-out
6	Cazasu	16	8	2	6	44	29	+15	26	Qualification to championship play-out
7	Tricolorul Viziru	16	4	1	11	33	55	−22	13	Qualification to championship play-out
8	Viitorul Însurăței	16	1	1	14	22	103	−81	4 (Note: Viitorul Însurăței are ahead of Suporter Club Brăila on head-to-head points: Viitorul Însurăței 7–7 Suporter Club Brăila, Suporter Club Brăila 1–2 Viitorul Însurăței.)	Qualification to championship play-out
9	Suporter Club Brăila	16	1	1	14	30	74	−44	4	Qualification to championship play-out

Rules for classification: 1) Points; 2) Head-to-head points; 3) Head-to-head goal difference; 4) Head-to-head goals scored; 5) Head-to-head away goals scored; 6) Goal difference; 7) Goals scored.
Notes:

Championship play-off

Pos	Team	Pld	W	D	L	GF	GA	GD	Pts	Qualification
1	Făurei (C, Q)	6	4	1	1	18	9	+9	13	Qualification to promotion play-off
2	Viitorul Ianca	6	2	2	2	12	12	0	8	
3	Daous Dava 2018 Brăila	6	2	1	3	12	11	+1	7	
4	Șoimii Tudor Vladimirescu	6	2	0	4	11	21	−10	6	

Rules for classification: 1) Points; 2) Head-to-head points; 3) Head-to-head goal difference; 4) Head-to-head goals scored; 5) Head-to-head away goals scored; 6) Goal difference; 7) Goals scored.
(C) Champions; (Q) Qualified for the phase indicated

Championship play-out

Pos	Team	Pld	W	D	L	GF	GA	GD	Pts	Relegation
5	Viitorul Galbenu	8	7	0	1	32	14	+18	21	
6	Tricolorul Viziru	8	5	0	3	38	22	+16	15	
7	Cazasu	8	4	2	2	37	24	+13	14	
8	Suporter Club Brăila	8	1	2	5	27	37	−10	5	
9	Viitorul Însurăței (R)	8	0	2	6	21	58	−37	2	Relegation to Liga V Brăila

Rules for classification: 1) Points; 2) Head-to-head points; 3) Head-to-head goal difference; 4) Head-to-head goals scored; 5) Head-to-head away goals scored; 6) Goal difference; 7) Goals scored.
(R) Relegated

=== Bucharest ===
The Liga IV Bucharest will be played in a double round-robin format featuring fourteen teams, followed by a championship play-off contested in a single round-robin format between the top four teams of the regular season. Based on their positions in the regular season, the teams will start the play-off with the following points: 1st place – 3 points, 2nd place – 2 points, 3rd place – 1 point, and 4th place – 0 points.

Team changes from the previous season

- NFC Arena (12th place) was relegated to Liga V Bucharest.
- Pro Team București (Series I winners) was promoted from Liga V Bucharest.
- Sportul D&A București II (Series II winners) did not have the right for promotion from Liga V Bucharest.
- Progresul 2005 București, ACP 3 Kids Sport and Rapid FNG București withdrew.
- Real New București, Internațional Pantere București, and ACSFI Adrian Mutu were admitted upon request.
- ACS Alexandru Văidean (11th place) was spared from relegation.
- Centrul German de Fotbal was renamed Academia Germană.
- Omega București was renamed Omega Sport București.

Pos	Team	Pld	W	D	L	GF	GA	GD	Pts	Qualification or relegation
1	Omega Sport București	26	26	0	0	190	13	+177	78	Qualification to championship play-off
2	Știința București	26	19	2	5	131	31	+100	59	Qualification to championship play-off
3	Daco-Getica București	26	18	3	5	95	32	+63	57	Qualification to championship play-off
4	Academia Germană	26	18	2	6	112	32	+80	56	Qualification to championship play-off
5	Juniorul 2014 București	26	17	4	5	74	35	+39	55	
6	Metaloglobus București II	26	17	1	8	86	41	+45	52	
7	Adrian Mutu	26	12	3	11	78	67	+11	39	
8	Romprim București	26	11	1	14	44	66	−22	34	
9	Sportul D&A București	26	11	1	14	60	94	−34	34	
10	Pro Team București	26	8	1	17	44	90	−46	25	
11	Dan Chilom	26	6	2	18	33	94	−61	20	
12	Real New București	26	3	4	19	22	101	−79	13	
13	Internațional Pantere București (R)	26	2	0	24	29	133	−104	6	Relegation to Liga V Bucharest
14	Alexandru Văidean (R)	26	2	0	24	28	197	−169	6	Relegation to Liga V Bucharest

Rules for classification: 1) Points; 2) Head-to-head points; 3) Head-to-head goal difference; 4) Head-to-head goals scored; 5) Head-to-head away goals scored; 6) Goal difference; 7) Goals scored.
(R) Relegated

Championship play-off

All matches were played at Regie Stadium in Bucharest on 23 and 31 May and 7 June 2026.

Pos	Team	Pld	W	D	L	GF	GA	GD	Pts	Qualification
1	Omega Sport București (C, Q)	3	3	0	0	9	1	+8	12	Qualification to promotion play-off
2	Știința București	3	2	0	1	5	4	+1	8	
3	Daco-Getica București	3	1	0	2	4	5	−1	4	
4	Academia Germană	3	0	0	3	0	8	−8	0	

Rules for classification: 1) Points; 2) Head-to-head points; 3) Head-to-head goal difference; 4) Head-to-head goals scored; 5) Head-to-head away goals scored; 6) Goal difference; 7) Goals scored.
(C) Champions; (Q) Qualified for the phase indicated

=== Buzău County ===
The Liga IV Buzău County was played in a regular season contested by sixteen teams in a single round-robin format, followed by a championship play-off with the top eight teams and a championship play-out with the bottom eight, both played in a double round-robin format. Teams will enter these stages with all points accumulated during the regular season, with no other records carried over.

Team changes from the previous season

- Voința Limpeziș was relegated from Liga III.
- Recolta Smeeni (15th place) and Progresul Beceni (16th place) were relegated to Liga V Buzău.
- Recolta Cislău (Series I winners) and Avântul Glodeanu-Siliștea (Series II winners) were promoted from Liga V Buzău.
- Voința Cochirleanca (Series III winners) and Victoria Grebanu (Series III runners-up and play-off winners) declined promotion from Liga V Buzău.
- ASC Vernești (13th place) and Unirea Stâlpu (14th place) were spared from relegation.
- Voința Balta Albă withdrew.

Pos	Team	Pld	W	D	L	GF	GA	GD	Pts	Qualification
1	Petrolul Berca	15	14	1	0	71	10	+61	43	Qualification to championship play-off
2	Carpați Nehoiu	15	14	0	1	48	8	+40	42	Qualification to championship play-off
3	Voința Lanurile	15	12	1	2	53	18	+35	37	Qualification to championship play-off
4	Gloria Vadu Pașii	15	11	1	3	67	22	+45	34	Qualification to championship play-off
5	Montana Pătârlagele	15	10	2	3	31	13	+18	32	Qualification to championship play-off
6	Team Săgeata	15	9	1	5	33	21	+12	28	Qualification to championship play-off
7	Știința Cernătești	15	7	1	7	35	32	+3	22	Qualification to championship play-off
8	Viitorul Gherăseni	15	6	1	8	24	28	−4	19	Qualification to championship play-off
9	Pescărușul Luciu	15	4	4	7	35	36	−1	16	Qualification to championship play-out
10	Recolta Sălcioara	15	5	1	9	26	37	−11	16	Qualification to championship play-out
11	Voința Limpeziș	15	5	1	9	24	36	−12	13 (Note: Voința Limpeziș deducted 3 points.)	Qualification to championship play-out
12	Vernești	15	4	1	10	28	41	−13	13	Qualification to championship play-out
13	Avântul Glodeanu-Siliștea	15	4	2	9	31	54	−23	11 (Note: Avântul Glodeanu-Siliștea deducted 3 points.)	Qualification to championship play-out
14	Șoimii Siriu	15	2	4	9	20	57	−37	10	Qualification to championship play-out
15	Unirea Stâlpu	15	2	1	12	19	57	−38	7	Qualification to championship play-out
16	Recolta Cislău	15	0	0	15	11	86	−75	0	Qualification to championship play-out

Rules for classification: 1) Points; 2) Head-to-head points; 3) Head-to-head goal difference; 4) Head-to-head goals scored; 5) Head-to-head away goals scored; 6) Goal difference; 7) Goals scored.
Notes:

Championship play-off

Pos	Team	Pld	W	D	L	GF	GA	GD	Pts	Qualification
1	Petrolul Berca (C, Q)	14	13	1	0	56	11	+45	83	Qualification to promotion play-off
2	Carpați Nehoiu	14	9	3	2	47	15	+32	72	
3	Voința Lanurile	14	6	1	7	26	31	−5	56	
4	Gloria Vadu Pașii	14	6	2	6	36	39	−3	54	
5	Montana Pătârlagele	14	6	1	7	23	32	−9	51	
6	Team Săgeata	14	2	4	8	17	43	−26	38	
7	Știința Cernătești	14	4	1	9	29	34	−5	35	
8	Viitorul Gherăseni	14	2	3	9	17	46	−29	28	

Rules for classification: 1) Points; 2) Head-to-head points; 3) Head-to-head goal difference; 4) Head-to-head goals scored; 5) Head-to-head away goals scored; 6) Goal difference; 7) Goals scored.
(C) Champions; (Q) Qualified for the phase indicated

Championship play-out

Pos	Team	Pld	W	D	L	GF	GA	GD	Pts	Relegation
9	Avântul Glodeanu-Siliștea	12	10	0	2	44	10	+34	41	
10	Voința Limpeziș	12	8	2	2	40	20	+20	39	
11	Pescărușul Luciu	12	7	1	4	31	23	+8	38	
12	Recolta Sălcioara	12	3	1	8	23	32	−9	26	
13	Unirea Stâlpu (R)	12	5	2	5	21	22	−1	24	Relegation to Liga V Buzău
14	Recolta Cislău (R)	12	4	2	6	18	28	−10	14	Relegation to Liga V Buzău
15	Șoimii Siriu (R)	12	1	0	11	9	51	−42	13	Relegation to Liga V Buzău
16	Vernești (Note: Vernești withdrew before the start of the second stage.) (D)	0	0	0	0	0	0	0	13	Withdrew

Rules for classification: 1) Points; 2) Head-to-head points; 3) Head-to-head goal difference; 4) Head-to-head goals scored; 5) Head-to-head away goals scored; 6) Goal difference; 7) Goals scored.
(D) Disqualified; (R) Relegated

=== Caraș-Severin County ===
Team changes from the previous season

- Mundo Reșița (13th place; withdrew) and Magica Balta Caransebeș (14th place; withdrew) were relegated to Liga V Caraș-Severin.
- CSM Caransebeș (winners) and Starigrad Karașevo (runners-up) were promoted from Liga V Caraș-Severin.
- CS Oțelu Roșu and CS Mehadia withdrew.
- Minerul Sasca Montană and CSC Dalboșeț were admitted upon request.
- Starigrad Karașevo was renamed Prolaz Carașova.

Pos	Team	Pld	W	D	L	GF	GA	GD	Pts	Qualification or relegation (Note: After 24 matches, the top four teams qualify for the championship play-off.)
1	Nera Bogodinț (C, Q)	27	24	3	0	84	17	+67	75	Qualification to promotion play-off
2	Caransebeș	27	24	2	1	151	16	+135	74	
3	Voința Șoșdea	27	19	1	7	116	57	+59	58	
4	Minerul Dognecea	27	14	2	11	74	63	+11	44	
5	Minerul Sasca Montană	24	12	4	8	74	51	+23	40	
6	Oravița	24	12	1	11	66	59	+7	37	
7	Narcisa Zervești	24	11	2	11	67	72	−5	35	
8	Prolaz Carașova	24	8	3	13	57	66	−9	27	
9	Dalboșeț	24	7	3	14	43	93	−50	24	
10	Viitorul Armeniș	24	7	2	15	45	65	−20	23	
11	Nera Bozovici	24	5	1	18	36	95	−59	16	
12	Moldova Nouă	24	4	1	19	37	95	−58	13	
13	Anina (R)	24	2	1	21	30	131	−101	7	Relegation to Liga V Caraș-Severin
14	Voința Vrani (Note: Voința Vrani withdrew after 8 rounds and all its results were canceled. At the time, they were ranked 14th with 0 win, 0 draws, 8 losses, 6–49 goals, and 0 points) (D)	0	0	0	0	0	0	0	0	Withdrew

Rules for classification: 1) Points; 2) Head-to-head points; 3) Head-to-head goal difference; 4) Head-to-head goals scored; 5) Head-to-head away goals scored; 6) Goal difference; 7) Goals scored.
(C) Champions; (D) Disqualified; (Q) Qualified for the phase indicated; (R) Relegated

=== Călărași County ===
Team changes from the previous season

- Viitorul Sărulești (8th place in West Series), Unirea Dragalina (8th place in East Series), Conpet Ștefan cel Mare (9th place in East Series) and Partizan Crivăț (9th place in West Series; withdrew) were relegated to Liga V Călărași.
- Voința Chiselet (West Series winners) was promoted from Liga V Călărași.
- Dunărea Călărași II withdrew.
- Avântul Independența (East Series winners) declined promotion.

Pos	Team	Pld	W	D	L	GF	GA	GD	Pts	Qualification or relegation
1	Spicul Vâlcelele (C, Q)	24	20	1	3	86	36	+50	61	Qualification to promotion play-off
2	Dunărea Ciocănești	24	19	2	3	76	29	+47	59	
3	Oltenița	24	16	4	4	86	26	+60	52	
4	Victoria Chirnogi	24	13	5	6	60	41	+19	44	
5	Roseți	24	11	4	9	65	43	+22	37	
6	Unirea Mânăstirea	24	11	3	10	49	45	+4	36	
7	Zarea Cuza Vodă	24	8	6	10	49	50	−1	30	
8	Victoria Lehliu	24	9	2	13	49	65	−16	29	
9	Dunărea Grădiștea	24	7	6	11	38	64	−26	27 (Note: Dunărea Grădiștea are ahead of Voința Chiselet on head-to-head points: Dunărea Grădiștea 3–0 Voința Chiselet, Voința Chiselet 1–1 Dunărea Grădiștea.)	
10	Voința Chiselet	24	8	3	13	40	56	−16	27	
11	Steaua Radovanu	24	7	2	15	45	70	−25	23	
12	Gloria Fundeni	24	4	1	19	35	79	−44	13	
13	Gâldău (R)	24	3	1	20	29	103	−74	10	Relegation to Liga V Călărași
14	Viitorul Dragoș Vodă (Note: Viitorul Dragoș Vodă withdrew after 7 rounds and all its results were canceled. At the time, they were ranked 9th with 2 win, 1 draws, 4 losses, 12–21 goals, and 7 points) (D)	0	0	0	0	0	0	0	0	Withdrew

Rules for classification: 1) Points; 2) Head-to-head points; 3) Head-to-head goal difference; 4) Head-to-head goals scored; 5) Head-to-head away goals scored; 6) Goal difference; 7) Goals scored.
(C) Champions; (D) Disqualified; (Q) Qualified for the phase indicated; (R) Relegated

=== Cluj County ===
Team changes from the previous season

- Sticla Arieșul Turda was invited to join Liga III.
- Juniorul Cluj (10th place) was relegated to Liga V Cluj.
- Someșul Gilău (Cluj Zone winners) and Avântul Suatu Vaida-Cămăraș (Mociu Zone winners) were promoted from Liga V Cluj.
- FC Bonțida (Gherla Zone winners), Amicii Turda (Câmpia Turzii Zone Cluj winners) and Progresul Cuzdrioara (Dej Zone winners) declined promotion from Liga V Cluj.
- Vulturul Mintiu Gherlii, relegated from Liga III, was enrolled in the fifth tier.
- Avântul Bizonii Recea-Cristur, Unirea Iclod, Juniorul Cluj and ȘF Dan Matei withdrew.
- Sporting Cluj-Napoca and Viitorul Mihai Georgescu Cluj-Napoca were admitted upon request.

Pos	Team	Pld	W	D	L	GF	GA	GD	Pts	Qualification or relegation (Note: Teams are split into two groups (play-off and play-out) after each have played 16 matches.)
1	Victoria Viișoara (C, Q)	22	19	2	1	78	22	+56	59	Qualification to promotion play-off
2	Arieșul Mihai Viteazu	22	18	0	4	82	26	+56	54	
3	Atletic Olimpia Gherla	22	13	2	7	62	38	+24	41	
4	Sporting Cluj-Napoca	22	8	1	13	47	58	−11	25	
5	Viitorul Mihai Georgescu Cluj-Napoca	18	7	2	9	33	45	−12	23	
6	Someșul Gilău	18	6	1	11	34	57	−23	19	
7	Sănătatea Cluj II	18	6	0	12	38	52	−14	18	
8	Avântul Suatu Vaida-Cămăraș (Note: Avântul Suatu Vaida-Cămăraș and Academia Florești withdrew during the second half of the season and lost all their second-half matches 0–3.)	15	4	0	11	22	35	−13	12	
9	Academia Florești	15	1	0	14	5	68	−63	3	

Updated to match(es) played on comnplete. Source:
Rules for classification: 1) Points; 2) Head-to-head points; 3) Head-to-head goal difference; 4) Head-to-head goals scored; 5) Head-to-head away goals scored; 6) Goal difference; 7) Goals scored.
(C) Champions; (Q) Qualified for the phase indicated

=== Constanța County ===
Team changes from the previous season

- CS Agigea achieved promotion to Liga III.
- Farul Tuzla (17th place) was relegated to Liga V Constanța.
- Gloria Albești (South Series winners) was promoted from Liga V Constanța.
- Litoral Sport 2022 Corbu (North Series winners) declined promotion from Liga V Constanța.
- Viitorul Cobadin II (West Series winners) did not have the right for promotion from Liga V Constanța.
- CS Mihail Kogălniceanu was spared from relegation.

Pos	Team	Pld	W	D	L	GF	GA	GD	Pts	Qualification or relegation
1	Portul Constanța (C, Q)	30	25	2	3	71	34	+37	77	Qualification to promotion play-off
2	Constructorul Topraisar	30	25	1	4	155	37	+118	76	
3	Sparta Techirghiol	30	22	4	4	104	35	+69	70	
4	Năvodari	30	21	3	6	85	40	+45	66	
5	Poseidon Limanu	30	20	5	5	95	27	+68	65	
6	Murfatlar	30	20	3	7	87	54	+33	63	
7	Victoria Cumpăna	30	16	3	11	56	39	+17	51	
8	Lumina	30	16	2	12	90	63	+27	50	
9	Aurora 23 August	30	12	1	17	68	74	−6	37	
10	Eforie	30	11	2	17	61	93	−32	35	
11	Viitorul Cobadin	30	10	2	18	65	97	−32	32	
12	Gloria Albești	30	10	1	19	57	78	−21	31	
13	Ovidiu	30	8	2	20	62	101	−39	26	
14	Viitorul Hârșova (R)	30	4	0	26	18	96	−78	12	Relegation to Liga V Constanța
15	Știința ACALAB Poarta Albă (R)	30	3	1	26	25	107	−82	10	Relegation to Liga V Constanța
16	Mihail Kogălniceanu (R)	30	1	0	29	6	130	−124	3	Relegation to Liga V Constanța

Rules for classification: 1) Points; 2) Head-to-head points; 3) Head-to-head goal difference; 4) Head-to-head goals scored; 5) Head-to-head away goals scored; 6) Goal difference; 7) Goals scored.
(C) Champions; (Q) Qualified for the phase indicated; (R) Relegated

=== Covasna County ===
Team changes from the previous season

- Nemere Ghelința withdrew.
- Viitorul Amo Barcani was admitted upon request.

Pos	Team	Pld	W	D	L	GF	GA	GD	Pts	Qualification or relegation
1	Carpați Covasna (C, Q)	28	25	2	1	145	16	+129	77	Qualification to promotion play-off
2	Prima Brăduț	28	23	2	3	126	27	+99	71	
3	Baraolt	27	20	3	4	121	38	+83	63	
4	Stăruința Zagon	28	18	6	4	105	38	+67	60	
5	Arcuș	27	15	4	8	88	49	+39	49	
6	Progresul Sita Buzăului	27	15	3	9	93	51	+42	48	
7	Viitorul Amo Barcani	28	14	3	11	99	57	+42	45	
8	Catalina	28	9	9	10	59	59	0	36	
9	Perkö Sânzieni	28	8	6	14	56	71	−15	30	
10	Moacșa	26	9	2	15	66	98	−32	29	
11	Păpăuți	27	8	3	16	53	119	−66	27	
12	Harghita Aita Mare	26	7	1	18	35	89	−54	22	
13	Ciucaș Întorsura Buzăului	28	5	1	22	36	110	−74	16	
14	Cernat	28	5	0	23	33	151	−118	15	
15	Venus Ozun	26	1	1	24	35	177	−142	4	

Updated to match(es) played on 14 June 2026. Source:
Rules for classification: 1) Points; 2) Head-to-head points; 3) Head-to-head goal difference; 4) Head-to-head goals scored; 5) Head-to-head away goals scored; 6) Goal difference; 7) Goals scored.
(C) Champions; (Q) Qualified for the phase indicated

=== Dâmbovița County ===
Team changes from the previous season

- Voința Crevedia achieved promotion to Liga III.
- FC Lungulețu (15th place and promotion/relegation play-offs losers), ACS Dragomirești (16th place) were relegated to Liga V Dâmbovița
- Sportul Vlădeni (North Series winners), Ravens Corbii Mari (South Series winners) and Voința Crețu (South Series runners-up andpromotion/relegation play-offs winners) were promoted from Liga V Dâmbovița.

Pos	Team	Pld	W	D	L	GF	GA	GD	Pts	Qualification or relegation
1	Recolta Gura Șuții (C, Q)	28	20	3	5	85	36	+49	63	Qualification to promotion play-off
2	Viitorul Cojasca	28	18	4	6	87	39	+48	58	
3	Sportul Vlădeni	28	17	4	7	80	35	+45	55	
4	Libertatea Urziceanca	28	17	3	8	75	41	+34	54	
5	Voința Tătărani	28	15	4	9	69	47	+22	49	
6	Săgeata Braniștea	28	12	6	10	63	55	+8	42	
7	Viitorul Voinești	28	12	6	10	58	56	+2	42	
8	Voința Crețu	28	12	2	14	47	58	−11	38	
9	Fieni	28	11	4	13	50	67	−17	37	
10	1976 Potlogi	28	11	3	14	64	75	−11	36 (Note: Potlogi are ahead of Viitorul Aninoasa on head-to-head points: Viitorul Aninoasa 1–3 Potlogi, Potlogi 3–1 Viitorul Aninoasa.)	
11	Viitorul Aninoasa (R)	28	10	6	12	56	58	−2	36	Qualification to relegation play-out
12	Roberto Ziduri	28	10	4	14	51	72	−21	34	Qualification to relegation play-out
13	Ravens Corbii Mari (R)	28	9	3	16	62	87	−25	30	Relegation to Liga V Dâmbovița
14	1948 Brezoaele (R)	28	4	5	19	52	106	−54	17	Relegation to Liga V Dâmbovița
15	Flacăra Șuța Seacă (R)	28	2	3	23	42	109	−67	9	Relegation to Liga V Dâmbovița

Rules for classification: 1) Points; 2) Head-to-head points; 3) Head-to-head goal difference; 4) Head-to-head goals scored; 5) Head-to-head away goals scored; 6) Goal difference; 7) Goals scored.
(C) Champions; (Q) Qualified for the phase indicated; (R) Relegated
Notes:

Relegation play-out

The 11th and 12th-placed teams of Liga IV will face the 2nd-placed teams of the two series of Liga V Dâmbovița – County.

Team 1	Score	Team 2
Valahii 1456 Târgoviște	3–1 (a.e.t.)	Viitorul Aninoasa
Olimpia Picior de Munte	–	1976 Potlogi / Roberto Ziduri

=== Dolj County ===
Team changes from the previous season

- ACS Leamna (13th place) and Dunărea Calafat (14th place; withdrew) were relegated to Liga V Dolj.
- Viitorul Calafat (Series I winners) and Fulgerul Mârșani (Series III winners) were promoted from Liga V Dolj.
- Viitorul Teasc (Series II winners) declined promotion from Liga V Dolj.
- Metropolitan Ișalnița II (Series IV winners) did not have the right for promotion from Liga V Dolj.
- Unirea Tricolor Dăbuleni withdrew.
- Tractorul Cetate, Viitorul Lăcrița and Avicola Rojiște were admitted upon request.

Pos	Team	Pld	W	D	L	GF	GA	GD	Pts	Qualification or relegation
1	Avântul Pielești (C, Q)	30	25	4	1	132	20	+112	79	Qualification for promotion play-off
2	RFG Melinești	30	24	3	3	117	32	+85	75	
3	Cârcea	30	23	3	4	118	24	+94	72	
4	Metropolitan Ișalnița	30	20	2	8	80	37	+43	62	
5	Tractorul Cetate	30	19	4	7	102	46	+56	61	
6	Viitorul Calafat	30	18	5	7	77	47	+30	59	
7	Unirea Amărăștii de Jos	30	14	4	12	76	59	+17	46	
8	Știința Celaru	30	14	3	13	72	61	+11	45	
9	Avicola Rojiște	30	11	6	13	60	55	+5	39	
10	Știința Danubius Bechet	30	10	5	15	73	73	0	35	
11	Știința Cerăt	30	10	2	18	68	87	−19	32	
12	Progresul Băilești	30	9	3	18	39	65	−26	30	
13	Flacăra Moțăței	30	6	2	22	32	133	−101	20	
14	Viitorul Lăcrița (R)	30	6	1	23	37	97	−60	19	Relegation to Liga V Dolj
15	Fulgerul Mârșani (R)	30	4	2	24	32	116	−84	14	Relegation to Liga V Dolj
16	Progresul Segarcea (R)	30	2	1	27	21	184	−163	7	Relegation to Liga V Dolj

Rules for classification: 1) Points; 2) Head-to-head points; 3) Head-to-head goal difference; 4) Head-to-head goals scored; 5) Head-to-head away goals scored; 6) Goal difference; 7) Goals scored.
(C) Champions; (Q) Qualified for the phase indicated; (R) Relegated

=== Galați County ===
Team changes from the previous season

- ACS Lascăr Schela (12th place) was relegated to Liga V Galați.
- Viitorul Slobozia Conachi (winners) and Luceafărul Berești (runners-up) were promoted from Liga V Galați.
- Viitorul Slobozia Conachi was renamed Sporting Galați.

Pos	Team	Pld	W	D	L	GF	GA	GD	Pts	Qualification or relegation
1	Gloria Ivești (C, Q)	24	20	1	3	86	19	+67	61	Qualification to promotion play-off
2	Voința Cudalbi	24	18	4	2	75	37	+38	58	
3	Viitorul Umbrărești	24	15	2	7	78	34	+44	47	
4	Victoria Independența	24	15	2	7	70	40	+30	47	
5	Luceafărul Berești	24	15	0	9	69	31	+38	45	
6	Covurluiul 2021 Târgu Bujor	24	10	4	10	55	41	+14	34	
7	Avântul Drăgănești	24	10	4	10	55	61	−6	34	
8	Ghidigeni	24	7	7	10	48	51	−3	28	
9	Siretul Cosmești	24	8	4	12	42	56	−14	28	
10	Progresul Munteni	24	8	3	13	53	73	−20	27	
11	Alegria JS Matca	24	7	1	16	51	85	−34	22	
12	Sporting Galați	24	5	0	19	38	106	−68	15	
13	Agrostar Tulucești (Note: Agrostar Tulucești were excluded after 17 rounds due to two no-shows and lost all remaining matches in the second half 0–3. At the time, they were ranked 13th, with 2 wins, 0 draws, 15 losses, an 19–78 goals, and 6 points.)	24	2	0	22	19	105	−86	6	

Rules for classification: 1) Points; 2) Head-to-head points; 3) Head-to-head goal difference; 4) Head-to-head goals scored; 5) Head-to-head away goals scored; 6) Goal difference; 7) Goals scored.
(C) Champions; (Q) Qualified for the phase indicated

=== Gorj County ===
The Liga IV Gorj County was played in a double round-robin format, followed by a championship play-off between the top four teams, also played home and away, with all results from the regular season carried over.

Team changes from the previous season

- CSM Târgu Jiu achieved promotion to Liga III.
- Știința Drăguțești (17th place; withdrew) and 7 Noiembrie Costești (18th place; withdrew) were relegated to Liga V Gorj.
- Știința Godinești (Series I winners) and Gilortul Bengești (Series II winners) declined promotion from Liga V Gorj.
- Unirea Țânțăreni, Gilortul Târgu Cărbunești II and Vulturii Fărcășești II withdrew.
- AS Jupânești was renamed Dinamic Club Jupânești.

Pos	Team	Pld	W	D	L	GF	GA	GD	Pts	Qualification or relegation (Note: After 22 matches, the top four teams qualify for the championship play-off.)
1	Negomir (C, Q)	28	20	6	2	80	25	+55	66	Qualification to promotion play-off
2	Turceni	28	18	5	5	73	28	+45	59	
3	Internațional Bălești	28	14	5	9	49	30	+19	47	
4	Minerul Motru	28	13	8	7	45	28	+17	47	
5	Petrolul Țicleni	22	10	5	7	47	25	+22	35	
6	Tismana	22	9	8	5	37	27	+10	35	
7	Petrolul Stoina	22	8	7	7	37	35	+2	31	
8	Minerul Mătăsari	22	6	6	10	30	38	−8	24	
9	Dinamic Club Jupânești	22	6	6	10	25	56	−31	24	
10	Parângul Bumbești-Jiu	22	3	5	14	23	47	−24	14	
11	Petrolul Bustuchin	22	1	6	15	12	51	−39	9	
12	Jiul Rovinari	22	1	3	18	14	82	−68	6	

Rules for classification: 1) Points; 2) Head-to-head points; 3) Head-to-head goal difference; 4) Head-to-head goals scored; 5) Head-to-head away goals scored; 6) Goal difference; 7) Goals scored.
(C) Champions; (Q) Qualified for the phase indicated

=== Giurgiu County ===
The Liga IV Giurgiu County was played in two stages, with a regular season split into two series of twelve teams each, followed by a championship play-off and play-out. The play-off featured the top four teams from each series in a double round-robin format, with teams starting from 3, 2, 1, and 0 points based on their final ranking in the regular season. The play-out included the teams ranked 5th to 12th in each series, also in a double round-robin format, with teams remaining within their respective series and starting with all points accumulated in the regular season. The bottom two teams from each series were relegated to Liga V Giurgiu County.

Team changes from the previous season

- AXI Adunații-Copăceni achieved promotion to Liga III.
- Real Colibași (South Series 12th place), FC Bolintin-Deal (North Series 11th place) and AFC Singureni (North Series 12th place; withdrew) were relegated to Liga V Giurgiu.
- AS Scărișoara (South Series winners), Viitorul Hulubești (South Series runners-up), Petrolul Roata (North Series winners) and Stejarul Bulbucata (North Series runners-up) were promoted from Liga V Giurgiu.
- Unirea Slobozia was renamed Academia Slobozia.

South Series

Pos	Team	Pld	W	D	L	GF	GA	GD	Pts	Qualification or relegation
1	Victoria Adunații-Copăceni	10	9	0	1	44	6	+38	27	Qualification to championship play-off
2	Dunărea Găujani	10	7	2	1	39	13	+26	23	Qualification to championship play-off
3	Giganții Vărăști	10	7	1	2	34	12	+22	22	Qualification to championship play-off
4	Mihai Bravu	10	6	1	3	41	16	+25	19	Qualification to championship play-off
5	Energia Remuș	10	5	2	3	20	17	+3	17	Qualification to championship play-out
6	Gloria Comana	10	4	1	5	22	23	−1	13	Qualification to championship play-out
7	Viitorul Hulubești	10	3	1	6	18	23	−5	10	Qualification to championship play-out
8	Academia Slobozia	10	3	0	7	16	58	−42	9 (Note: Academia Slobozia are ahead of Viitorul Băneasa on head-to-head points: Academia Slobozia 4–0 Viitorul Băneasa.)	Qualification to championship play-out
9	Viitorul Băneasa	10	2	3	5	11	22	−11	9	Qualification to championship play-out
10	MV Călugăreni	10	2	1	7	11	31	−20	7	Qualification to championship play-out
11	Dunărea Oinacu	10	1	0	9	6	41	−35	3	Qualification to championship play-out
12	Scărișoara (Note: Scărișoara was deducted 2 points. Subsequently, it was expelled after seven rounds, and all its results were canceled. At the time, it was ranked 12th, with 0 wins, 0 draws, 7 losses, 2–30 goals, and -2 points.) (D)	0	0	0	0	0	0	0	0	Excluded

Rules for classification: 1) Points; 2) Head-to-head points; 3) Head-to-head goal difference; 4) Head-to-head goals scored; 5) Head-to-head away goals scored; 6) Goal difference; 7) Goals scored.
(D) Disqualified
Notes:

North Series

Pos	Team	Pld	W	D	L	GF	GA	GD	Pts	Qualification or relegation
1	Bolintin Malu Spart	11	10	0	1	34	6	+28	30	Qualification to championship play-off
2	Luceafărul Trestieni	11	9	0	2	39	15	+24	27	Qualification to championship play-off
3	Avântul Florești	11	6	3	2	25	24	+1	21 (Note: Avântul Florești are ahead of Petrolul Roata on head-to-head points: Petrolul Roata 0–1 Avântul Florești.)	Qualification to championship play-off
4	Petrolul Roata	11	7	0	4	30	21	+9	21	Qualification to championship play-off
5	Progresul Palanca	11	4	2	5	22	25	−3	14	Qualification to championship play-out
6	Silver Inter Zorile	11	4	1	6	27	28	−1	13 (Note: Silver Inter Zorile: 6 Pts, 12–5; Stejarul Bulbucata: 6 Pts, 6–10; Maxima Hobaia: 3 Pts, 6–8; Speranța Săbăreni: 3 Pts, 5–5.)	Qualification to championship play-out
7	Stejarul Bulbucata	11	4	1	6	18	33	−15	13	Qualification to championship play-out
8	Maxima Hobaia	11	4	1	6	23	26	−3	13 (Note: Maxima Hobaia are ahead of Speranța Săbăreni on head-to-head points: Maxima Hobaia 2–1 Speranța Săbăreni.)	Qualification to championship play-out
9	Speranța Săbăreni	11	4	1	6	24	27	−3	13	Qualification to championship play-out
10	Tântava	11	3	3	5	21	25	−4	12	Qualification to championship play-out
11	Podu Doamnei	11	3	0	8	18	35	−17	9	Qualification to championship play-out
12	Zmeii Ogrezeni	11	1	2	8	14	30	−16	5	Qualification to championship play-out

Rules for classification: 1) Points; 2) Head-to-head points; 3) Head-to-head goal difference; 4) Head-to-head goals scored; 5) Head-to-head away goals scored; 6) Goal difference; 7) Goals scored.
Notes:

Championship play-off

Pos	Team	Pld	W	D	L	GF	GA	GD	Pts	Qualification
1	Victoria Adunații-Copăceni (C, Q)	14	9	4	1	32	17	+15	34 (Note: Victoria Adunații-Copăceni are ahead of Dunărea Găujani on head-to-head points: Dunărea Găujani 1–3 Victoria Adunații-Copăceni, Victoria Adunații-Copăceni 1–1 Dunărea Găujani.)	Qualification to promotion play-off
2	Dunărea Găujani	14	10	2	2	45	14	+31	34	
3	Bolintin Malu Spart	14	8	4	2	43	18	+25	31	
4	Mihai Bravu	14	6	3	5	33	26	+7	21	
5	Luceafărul Trestieni	14	5	1	8	28	35	−7	18	
6	Petrolul Roata	14	5	1	8	17	30	−13	16	
7	Giganții Vărăști	14	3	2	9	19	38	−19	12	
8	Avântul Florești	14	1	1	12	15	54	−39	5	

Rules for classification: 1) Points; 2) Head-to-head points; 3) Head-to-head goal difference; 4) Head-to-head goals scored; 5) Head-to-head away goals scored; 6) Goal difference; 7) Goals scored.
(C) Champions; (Q) Qualified for the phase indicated
Notes:

Championship play-out
South Series

Pos	Team	Pld	W	D	L	GF	GA	GD	Pts	Relegation
5	Energia Remuș	12	10	0	2	50	15	+35	47	
6	Academia Slobozia	12	11	0	1	61	22	+39	42	
7	Viitorul Hulubești	12	6	0	6	28	30	−2	28 (Note: Viitorul Hulubești are ahead of Gloria Comana on head-to-head points: Gloria Comana 2–3 Viitorul Hulubești, Viitorul Hulubești 5–0 Gloria Comana.)	
8	Gloria Comana	12	5	0	7	19	33	−14	28	
9	MV Călugăreni	12	5	0	7	29	30	−1	22	
10	Dunărea Oinacu	12	5	0	7	24	45	−21	18	
11	Viitorul Băneasa (Note: Viitorul Băneasa withdrew before the start of the second stage and forfeited all matches 0–3.) (R)	12	0	0	12	0	36	−36	9	Relegation to Liga V Giurgiu
12	Scărișoara (Note: Scărișoara was expelled during the first stage.) (R)	0	0	0	0	0	0	0	0	Excluded

Rules for classification: 1) Points; 2) Head-to-head points; 3) Head-to-head goal difference; 4) Head-to-head goals scored; 5) Head-to-head away goals scored; 6) Goal difference; 7) Goals scored.
(R) Relegated
Notes:

North Series

Pos	Team	Pld	W	D	L	GF	GA	GD	Pts	Relegation
5	Maxima Hobaia	14	7	2	5	52	37	+15	36	
6	Tântava	14	6	3	5	36	28	+8	33 (Note: Tântava are ahead of Speranța Săbăreni on head-to-head points: Speranța Săbăreni 1–2 Tântava, Tântava 4–2 Speranța Săbăreni.)	
7	Speranța Săbăreni	14	6	2	6	27	29	−2	33	
8	Zmeii Ogrezeni	14	8	3	3	39	31	+8	32 (Note: Zmeii Ogrezeni are ahead of Podu Doamnei on head-to-head points: Zmeii Ogrezeni 6–2 Podu Doamnei, Podu Doamnei 3–1 Zmeii Ogrezeni.)	
9	Podu Doamnei	14	7	2	5	27	26	+1	32	
10	Progresul Palanca	14	5	2	7	28	34	−6	31	
11	Silver Inter Zorile (R)	14	4	4	6	23	27	−4	29	Relegation to Liga V Giurgiu
12	Stejarul Bulbucata (R)	14	3	2	9	23	43	−20	24	Relegation to Liga V Giurgiu

Rules for classification: 1) Points; 2) Head-to-head points; 3) Head-to-head goal difference; 4) Head-to-head goals scored; 5) Head-to-head away goals scored; 6) Goal difference; 7) Goals scored.
(R) Relegated

=== Harghita County ===
The Liga IV Harghita County was played in a double round-robin regular season, followed by a championship play-off and a play-out. The play-off will be contested by the top four teams in a double round-robin format, while the play-out will be played by the remaining seven teams in a single round-robin format. All teams will start with half of their regular-season points, rounded up, with no other records carried over.

Team changes from the previous season

- Ezüstfenyő Ciceu (10th place) and Bastya Lăzarea (11th place) were relegated to Liga V Harghita.
- Csikszentmarton Sânmartin (Ciuc Zone winners) was promoted from Liga V Harghita.
- Unirea Lueta (Odorhei Zone winners) declined promotion from Liga V Harghita.
- Făgetul Borsec was admitted upon request.

Pos	Team	Pld	W	D	L	GF	GA	GD	Pts	Qualification or relegation
1	Sânsimion	20	15	3	2	68	28	+40	48	Qualification to championship play-off
2	Golimpiakosz Odorheiu Secuiesc	20	14	4	2	72	30	+42	46	Qualification to championship play-off
3	Agyagfalvi Lendület Lutița	20	14	3	3	66	24	+42	45	Qualification to championship play-off
4	Metalul Vlăhița	20	10	1	9	47	50	−3	31	Qualification to championship play-off
5	Roseal Odorheiu Secuiesc	20	9	3	8	45	36	+9	30	Qualification to championship play-out
6	Unirea Cristuru Secuiesc	20	8	1	11	41	48	−7	25 (Note: Unirea Cristuru Secuiesc are ahead of Minerul Bălan on head-to-head points: Unirea Cristuru Secuiesc 5–0 Minerul Bălan, Minerul Bălan 1–2 Unirea Cristuru Secuiesc.)	Qualification to championship play-out
7	Minerul Bălan	20	8	1	11	45	52	−7	25	Qualification to championship play-out
8	Bradul Zetea	20	7	3	10	37	43	−6	24	Qualification to championship play-out
9	Pro Mureșul Toplița	20	6	1	13	27	60	−33	19 (Note: Pro Mureșul Toplița are ahead of Csikszentmarton Sânmartin on head-to-head away goals scored: Pro Mureșul Toplița 1–0 Csikszentmarton Sânmartin, Csikszentmarton Sânmartin 2–1 Pro Mureșul Toplița.)	Qualification to championship play-out
10	Csikszentmarton Sânmartin	20	6	1	13	27	58	−31	19	Qualification to championship play-out
11	Făgetul Borsec	20	2	1	17	31	77	−46	7	Qualification to championship play-out

Rules for classification: 1) Points; 2) Head-to-head points; 3) Head-to-head goal difference; 4) Head-to-head goals scored; 5) Head-to-head away goals scored; 6) Goal difference; 7) Goals scored.
Notes:

Championship play-off

Pos	Team	Pld	W	D	L	GF	GA	GD	Pts	Qualification
1	Sânsimion (C, Q)	6	4	1	1	17	6	+11	37	Qualification to promotion play-off
2	Agyagfalvi Lendület Lutița	6	3	1	2	11	13	−2	33	
3	Golimpiakosz Odorheiu Secuiesc	6	2	1	3	10	10	0	30	
4	Metalul Vlăhița	6	1	1	4	7	16	−9	20	

Rules for classification: 1) Points; 2) Points without rounding; 3) Head-to-head points in the play-off; 4) Goal difference in the play-off; 5) Regular season ranking.
(C) Champions; (Q) Qualified for the phase indicated

Championship play-out

Pos	Team	Pld	W	D	L	GF	GA	GD	Pts	Relegation
5	Roseal Odorheiu Secuiesc	6	4	0	2	20	15	+5	27	
6	Unirea Cristuru Secuiesc	6	4	0	2	26	13	+13	25	
7	Bradul Zetea	6	4	0	2	25	15	+10	24	
8	Minerul Bălan	6	3	1	2	32	11	+21	23	
9	Csikszentmarton Sânmartin	6	2	0	4	8	19	−11	16 (Note: Csikszentmarton Sânmartin are ahead of Pro Mureșul Toplița on head-to-head points in the play-out: Csikszentmarton Sânmartin 3–0 Pro Mureșul Toplița.)	
10	Pro Mureșul Toplița	6	2	0	4	9	35	−26	16	
11	Făgetul Borsec	6	1	1	4	6	18	−12	8	Relegation to Liga V Harghita

Rules for classification: 1) Points; 2) Points without rounding; 3) Head-to-head points in the play-out; 4) Goal difference in the play-out; 5) Regular season ranking.

=== Hunedoara County ===
The Liga IV Hunedoara County was played in a double round-robin regular season, followed by a Final Four stage for the top teams and a play-out for the remaining teams. The Final Four stage will be contested in a double round-robin format, while the play-out will be played in a single round-robin format, with teams starting both stages with half of their regular season points, rounded up, with no other records carried over.

Team changes from the previous season

- Unirea DMO achieved promotion to Liga III.
- Unirea DMO II (winners) declined promotion from Liga V Hunedoara.

Pos	Team	Pld	W	D	L	GF	GA	GD	Pts	Qualification
1	Deva	20	20	0	0	109	10	+99	60	Qualification to final four
2	Minerul Uricani	20	13	3	4	42	21	+21	42	Qualification to final four
3	Gloria Geoagiu	20	12	2	6	45	42	+3	38	Qualification to final four
4	Victoria Călan	20	12	0	8	50	33	+17	36	Qualification to final four
5	Aurul Brad	20	8	7	5	46	22	+24	31	Qualification to championship play-out
6	Retezatul Hațeg	20	7	3	10	46	50	−4	24	Qualification to championship play-out
7	CFR Simeria	20	7	2	11	32	38	−6	23	Qualification to championship play-out
8	Dacia Orăștie	20	6	3	11	27	47	−20	21	Qualification to championship play-out
9	Șoimul Băița	20	5	3	12	29	51	−22	18	Qualification to championship play-out
10	Inter Petrila	20	3	3	14	21	83	−62	12	Qualification to championship play-out
11	Mihai Viteazu Vulcan	20	3	2	15	34	84	−50	11	Qualification to championship play-out

Rules for classification: 1) Points; 2) Head-to-head points; 3) Head-to-head goal difference; 4) Head-to-head goals scored; 5) Head-to-head away goals scored; 6) Goal difference; 7) Goals scored.

Championship play-off
Final four

Pos	Team	Pld	W	D	L	GF	GA	GD	Pts	Qualification
1	Deva (C, Q)	6	6	0	0	41	0	+41	48	Qualification to promotion play-off
2	Minerul Uricani	6	2	1	3	15	16	−1	28	
3	Victoria Călan	6	2	1	3	8	16	−8	25	
4	Gloria Geoagiu	6	1	0	5	5	37	−32	22	

Rules for classification: 1) Points; 2) Points without rounding; 3) Head-to-head points in the play-off; 4) Goal difference in the play-off; 5) Regular season ranking.
(C) Champions; (Q) Qualified for the phase indicated

Championship play-out

Pos	Team	Pld	W	D	L	GF	GA	GD	Pts
5	Retezatul Hațeg	6	4	2	0	14	9	+5	26
6	Aurul Brad	6	3	0	3	7	5	+2	25 (Note: Aurul Brad are ahead of CFR Simeria on points without rounding.)
7	CFR Simeria	6	4	1	1	20	8	+12	25
8	Șoimul Băița	6	4	0	2	18	8	+10	21
9	Dacia Orăștie	6	3	0	3	18	6	+12	20
10	Mihai Viteazu Vulcan	6	1	1	4	14	27	−13	10
11	Inter Petrila	6	0	0	6	7	35	−28	6

Rules for classification: 1) Points; 2) Points without rounding; 3) Head-to-head points in the play-out; 4) Goal difference in the play-out; 5) Regular season ranking.

=== Ialomița County ===
Team changes from the previous season

- CSM Fetești was relegated from Liga III.
- AFC Iazu (13th place), CS Axintele (14th place), Stăruința Broșteni (15th place), Flacăra Mihail Kogălniceanu (16th place), Unirea Scânteia (17th place) and Secunda Adâncata (18th place; withdrew) were relegated to Liga V Ialomița.
- Ialomița Sudiți (Series I winners) and Recolta Malu Roșu (Series III winners) were promoted from Liga V Ialomița.
- FC Traian was admitted instead of Agronomia Bucu (Series II winners), which declined promotion from Liga V Ialomița.

Pos	Team	Pld	W	D	L	GF	GA	GD	Pts	Qualification
1	Bărăganul Ciulnița (C, Q)	30	28	1	1	128	30	+98	85	Qualification to promotion play-off
2	Rovine	30	21	6	3	120	38	+82	69	
3	Urziceni	30	17	6	7	92	38	+54	57	
4	Recolta Bărcănești	30	17	4	9	89	39	+50	55	
5	Înfrățirea Jilavele	30	15	9	6	56	43	+13	54	
6	Abatorul Slobozia	30	16	4	10	75	56	+19	52	
7	Victoria Munteni-Buzău	30	15	4	11	62	55	+7	49	
8	Fetești	30	15	1	14	73	77	−4	46	
9	Traian	30	13	6	11	77	59	+18	45	
10	Victoria Țăndărei	30	9	4	17	55	64	−9	31 (Note: Victoria Țăndărei are ahead of Dridu on goal difference: Dridu 3–1 Victoria Țăndărei, Victoria Țăndărei 3–1 Dridu.)	
11	Dridu	30	9	4	17	51	83	−32	31	
12	Recolta Malu Roșu	30	9	3	18	71	65	+6	30	
13	Viitorul Făcăeni	30	7	5	18	43	80	−37	26	
14	Real Cosâmbești (R)	30	6	6	18	28	72	−44	24	Relegation to Liga V Ialomița
15	Unirea Grivița (R)	30	5	3	22	33	120	−87	18	Relegation to Liga V Ialomița
16	Ialomița Sudiți (R)	30	4	2	24	36	170	−134	14	Relegation to Liga V Ialomița

Rules for classification: 1) Points; 2) Head-to-head points; 3) Head-to-head goal difference; 4) Head-to-head goals scored; 5) Head-to-head away goals scored; 6) Goal difference; 7) Goals scored.
(C) Champions; (Q) Qualified for the phase indicated; (R) Relegated

=== Iași County ===
Team changes from the previous season

- Moldova Cristești declined promotion to Liga III.
- Gloria Românești (15th place) and Viitorul Hărmănești (16th place) were relegated to Liga V Iași.
- Tonmir Iași (Series I winners) was promoted from Liga V Iași.
- Voința Moțca (Series II winners) declined promotion from Liga V Iași.
- Voința Voinești and Zimbru Boureni withdrew.
- Viitorul Belcești was admitted upon request.

Pos	Team	Pld	W	D	L	GF	GA	GD	Pts	Qualification or relegation
1	Pașcani (C, Q)	26	24	1	1	135	21	+114	73	Qualification to promotion play-off
2	Tonmir Iași	26	21	2	3	107	46	+61	65	
3	Țuțora	26	18	4	4	87	40	+47	58	
4	Victoria Lețcani	26	14	4	8	63	51	+12	46	
5	Gloria Bălțați	26	11	7	8	55	48	+7	40	
6	Stejarul Bârnova	26	11	3	12	54	53	+1	36	
7	Unirea Ruginoasa	26	10	4	12	46	47	−1	34 (Note: Unirea Ruginoasa are ahead of Moldova Cristești on head-to-head goal difference: Moldova Cristești 2–1 Unirea Ruginoasa, Unirea Ruginoasa 3–0 Moldova Cristești.)	
8	Moldova Cristești (Note: Moldova Cristești withdrew after 16 rounds and had all second-half matches awarded as 0–3 defeats. At the time, they were ranked 2nd with 13 wins, 2 draws, 1 loss, 61–13 goals, and 41 points.) (R)	24	11	1	12	43	41	+2	34	Relegation to Liga V Iași
9	Viitorul Belcești	26	9	5	12	49	65	−16	32	
10	Viitorul Hârlau	26	10	0	16	37	64	−27	30	
11	Tomești	26	7	2	17	56	102	−46	23	
12	Com-Val Valea Lupului (Note: Com-Val Valea Lupului withdrew after 15 rounds and had all second-half matches awarded as 0–3 defeats. At the time, they were ranked 5th with 8 wins, 1 draw, 6 losses, 49–39 goals, and 25 points.) (R)	24	7	0	17	37	62	−25	21	Relegation to Liga V Iași
13	Progresul Deleni	26	6	2	18	30	88	−58	20	
14	Unirea Scânteia (Note: Unirea Scânteia withdrew after 15 rounds and had all second-half matches awarded as 0–3 defeats. At the time, they were ranked 14th with 1 win, 3 draws, 11 losses, 16–60 goals, and 6 points.) (R)	24	1	3	20	16	87	−71	6	Relegation to Liga V Iași

Rules for classification: 1) Points; 2) Head-to-head points; 3) Head-to-head goal difference; 4) Head-to-head goals scored; 5) Head-to-head away goals scored; 6) Goal difference; 7) Goals scored.
(C) Champions; (Q) Qualified for the phase indicated; (R) Relegated

=== Ilfov County ===
Team changes from the previous season

- Progresul Mogoșoaia achieved promotion to Liga III.
- Viitorul Vidra (13th place) and FC 1 Decembrie (14th place; withdrew) were relegated to Liga V Ilfov.
- Unirea Dobroești (winners) was promoted from Liga V Ilfov.
- CSO Bragadiru, Viitorul Dragomirești-Vale and Stejarul Gruiu withdrew.

Pos	Team	Pld	W	D	L	GF	GA	GD	Pts	Qualification
1	Viitorul Corbeanca	16	11	4	1	42	17	+25	37	Qualification to championship play-off
2	Olimpic Snagov	16	11	3	2	43	18	+25	36	Qualification to championship play-off
3	Unirea Dobroești	16	9	2	5	38	27	+11	29	Qualification to championship play-off
4	Glina	16	10	1	5	39	27	+12	25 (Note: Glina and Măgurele were deducted 6 points.)	Qualification to championship play-off
5	Juniors Berceni	16	6	3	7	36	28	+8	21	Qualification to championship play-out
6	Voința Domnești	16	6	2	8	34	31	+3	20	Qualification to championship play-out
7	Ciorogârla	15	3	0	12	18	36	−18	9	Qualification to championship play-out
8	Brănești	15	2	3	10	12	41	−29	9	Qualification to championship play-out
9	Măgurele	16	4	0	12	12	49	−37	6	Qualification to championship play-out

Rules for classification: 1) Points; 2) Head-to-head points; 3) Head-to-head goal difference; 4) Head-to-head goals scored; 5) Head-to-head away goals scored; 6) Goal difference; 7) Goals scored.
Notes:

Championship play-off

Pos	Team	Pld	W	D	L	GF	GA	GD	Pts	Qualification
1	Viitorul Corbeanca (C, Q)	6	5	1	0	22	10	+12	20	Qualification to promotion play-off
2	Glina	6	2	3	1	19	14	+5	10	
3	Olimpic Snagov	6	1	2	3	10	15	−5	8	
4	Unirea Dobroești	6	1	0	5	8	20	−12	5	

Rules for classification: 1) Points; 2) Head-to-head points; 3) Head-to-head goal difference; 4) Head-to-head goals scored; 5) Head-to-head away goals scored; 6) Goal difference; 7) Goals scored.
(C) Champions; (Q) Qualified for the phase indicated

Championship play-out

Pos	Team	Pld	W	D	L	GF	GA	GD	Pts
5	Voința Domnești	3	2	1	0	8	3	+5	7
6	Ciorogârla	4	2	0	2	9	17	−8	6
7	Măgurele	4	1	2	1	6	8	−2	5
8	Brănești	3	1	0	2	14	8	+6	3
9	Juniors Berceni	2	0	1	1	1	2	−1	1

Updated to match(es) played on 6 June 2026. Source:
Rules for classification: 1) Points; 2) Head-to-head points; 3) Head-to-head goal difference; 4) Head-to-head goals scored; 5) Head-to-head away goals scored; 6) Goal difference; 7) Goals scored.

=== Maramureș County ===
Team changes from the previous season

- Cristalul Cavnic (8th; withdrew) and Bradul Groșii Țibleșului (17th place) were relegated to Liga V Maramureș.
- ACS Satu Nou de Jos (winners) and AS Ulmeni 2023 (runners-up) declined promotion from Liga V Maramureș.
- Plimob Sighetu Marmației withdrew.
- CS Fărcașa, ACS Remeți and Recolta Săliștea de Sus were spared from relegation.
- CS Fărcașa was renamed Prosport Fărcașa.

Pos	Team	Pld	W	D	L	GF	GA	GD	Pts	Qualification
1	Academica Recea	13	12	1	0	71	7	+64	37	Qualification to championship play-off
2	Progresul Șomcuta Mare	13	10	3	0	39	9	+30	33	Qualification to championship play-off
3	Avântul Bârsana	13	9	3	1	52	14	+38	30	Qualification to championship play-off
4	Bradul Vișeu	13	9	0	4	49	30	+19	27	Qualification to championship play-off
5	Șișești	13	8	0	5	28	29	−1	24	Qualification to championship play-off
6	Iza Dragomirești	13	6	2	5	34	35	−1	20	Qualification to championship play-off
7	Atletic Lăpuș	13	6	1	6	29	38	−9	19	Qualification to championship play-out
8	Minerul Baia Sprie	13	5	2	6	32	27	+5	17	Qualification to championship play-out
9	Suporter Baia Mare	13	4	3	6	29	41	−12	15	Qualification to championship play-out
10	Zorile Moisei	13	4	0	9	21	39	−18	12	Qualification to championship play-out
11	Prosport Fărcașa	13	3	2	8	29	39	−10	11	Qualification to championship play-out
12	Recolta Săliștea de Sus	13	3	2	8	18	40	−22	11	Qualification to championship play-out
13	Salina Ocna Șugatag	13	1	2	10	17	46	−29	5	Qualification to championship play-out
14	Remeți	13	0	1	12	9	63	−54	1	Qualification to championship play-out

Rules for classification: 1) Points; 2) Head-to-head points; 3) Head-to-head goal difference; 4) Head-to-head goals scored; 5) Head-to-head away goals scored; 6) Goal difference; 7) Goals scored.

Championship play-off

Pos	Team	Pld	W	D	L	GF	GA	GD	Pts	Qualification
1	Academica Recea (C, Q)	10	9	1	0	39	8	+31	71	Qualification to promotion play-off
2	Avântul Bârsana	10	5	2	3	30	25	+5	47	
3	Progresul Șomcuta Mare	10	1	2	7	19	27	−8	38 (Note: Progresul Șomcuta Mare are ahead of Șișești on regular season points.)	
4	Șișești	10	4	2	4	23	18	+5	38	
5	Bradul Vișeu	10	3	1	6	17	34	−17	37	
6	Iza Dragomirești	10	3	2	5	13	29	−16	31	

Rules for classification: 1) Points; 2) Head-to-head points; 3) Head-to-head goal difference; 4) Head-to-head goals scored; 5) Head-to-head away goals scored; 6) Goal difference; 7) Goals scored.
(C) Champions; (Q) Qualified for the phase indicated
Notes:

Championship play-out

Pos	Team	Pld	W	D	L	GF	GA	GD	Pts	Relegation
7	Minerul Baia Sprie	6	5	1	0	22	7	+15	33	
8	Atletic Lăpuș	6	1	2	3	13	15	−2	24 (Note: Atletic Lăpuș are ahead of Prosport Fărcașa on regular season points.)	
9	Prosport Fărcașa	6	4	1	1	24	10	+14	24	
10	Recolta Săliștea de Sus	6	3	1	2	13	11	+2	21	
11	Zorile Moisei	6	2	0	4	9	21	−12	18	
12	Salina Ocna Șugatag	6	2	1	3	13	17	−4	12	
13	Remeți (R)	6	1	0	5	9	22	−13	4	Relegation to Liga V Maramureș
14	Suporter Baia Mare (Note: Suporter Baia Mare withdrew before the second stage of the season.) (D)	0	0	0	0	0	0	0	0	Withdrew

Rules for classification: 1) Points; 2) Head-to-head points; 3) Head-to-head goal difference; 4) Head-to-head goals scored; 5) Head-to-head away goals scored; 6) Goal difference; 7) Goals scored.
(D) Disqualified; (R) Relegated

=== Mehedinți County ===
Team changes from the previous season

- CS Corcova (winners) was promoted from Liga V Mehedinți.
- Coșuștea Căzănești (15th place) and Inter Salcia (16th place; withdrew) were relegated to Liga V Mehedinți.
- CFR Turnu Severin, Victoria Strehaia and Academia Flavius Stoican withdrew.
- CS Drobeta Turnu Severin and Viitorul Strehaia were admitted upon request.

Pos	Team	Pld	W	D	L	GF	GA	GD	Pts	Qualification or relegation
1	Drobeta-Turnu Severin (C, Q)	26	25	1	0	171	15	+156	76	Qualification to promotion play-off
2	Drobeta 2024	26	23	2	1	112	21	+91	71	
3	Recolta Dănceu	26	20	1	5	98	43	+55	61	
4	Sănătatea Breznița-Ocol	26	15	2	9	48	40	+8	47	
5	Pandurii Cerneți	26	14	1	11	77	60	+17	43	
6	Decebal Eșelnița	26	13	3	10	52	69	−17	42	
7	Viitorul Cujmir	26	12	2	12	68	90	−22	38	
8	Viitorul Strehaia	26	10	2	14	42	56	−14	32	
9	Viitorul Severin	26	8	3	15	45	77	−32	27	
10	Corcova	26	8	1	17	49	74	−25	25	
11	Victoria Vânju Mare	26	5	8	13	39	84	−45	23	
12	Unirea Gârla Mare	26	6	4	16	53	93	−40	22	
13	Noapteșa	26	4	1	21	44	98	−54	13	
14	Victoria Drobeta-Turnu Severin	26	3	1	22	18	96	−78	10	

Rules for classification: 1) Points; 2) Head-to-head points; 3) Head-to-head goal difference; 4) Head-to-head goals scored; 5) Head-to-head away goals scored; 6) Goal difference; 7) Goals scored.
(C) Champions; (Q) Qualified for the phase indicated

=== Mureș County ===
Team changes from the previous season

- Avântul Reghin was relegated from Liga III.
- Chimica Târnăveni (16th place) was relegated to Liga V Mureș.
- Viitorul Jabenița (winners) and Real Valea Largă (runners-up) declined promotion from Liga V Mureș.
- Sâncrai Nazna withdrew.
- ASA Târgu Mureș took the place of Unirea Ungheni in Liga II.
- A&A Grup Târnăveni and Chimica Târnăveni ceased the activity of their senior teams and joined the newly founded CSM Târnăveni with their youth teams.

Pos	Team	Pld	W	D	L	GF	GA	GD	Pts	Qualification or relegation
1	Transilvania Târgu Mureș (C, Q)	26	21	0	5	68	31	+37	63	Qualification to promotion play-off
2	Avântul Reghin	26	20	1	5	71	23	+48	61	
3	Vulturii Târgu Mureș	26	18	4	4	81	28	+53	58	
4	Mureșul Rușii-Munți	26	16	2	8	74	39	+35	50	
5	Câmpia Râciu	26	14	4	8	56	44	+12	46	
6	Iernut	26	13	6	7	63	48	+15	45	
7	Târnăveni	26	14	1	11	67	52	+15	43	
8	Sângeorgiu de Pădure	26	12	4	10	44	49	−5	40	
9	Miercurea Nirajului	26	10	4	12	50	63	−13	34	
10	Búzásbesenyő Valea Izvoarelor	26	8	4	14	55	59	−4	28 (Note: Búzásbesenyő Valea Izvoarelor are ahead of Mureșul Luduș on head-to-head points: Búzásbesenyő Valea Izvoarelor 7–1 Mureșul Luduș, Mureșul Luduș 0–0 Búzásbesenyő Valea Izvoarelor.)	
11	Mureșul Luduș	26	8	4	14	36	56	−20	28	
12	Sovata	26	4	3	19	36	76	−40	15	
13	Viitorul Aluniș (R)	26	2	3	21	21	88	−67	9	Relegation to Liga V Mureș
14	Gaz Metan Daneș (R)	26	1	2	23	20	86	−66	5	Relegation to Liga V Mureș

Rules for classification: 1) Points; 2) Head-to-head points; 3) Head-to-head goal difference; 4) Head-to-head goals scored; 5) Head-to-head away goals scored; 6) Goal difference; 7) Goals scored.
(C) Champions; (Q) Qualified for the phase indicated; (R) Relegated

=== Neamț County ===
Team changes from the previous season

- Ozana Timișești (winners) and Unirea Dulcești (runners-up) were promoted from Liga V Neamț
- Viitorul Tarcău, Pietricica Piatra Neamț and Siretul Doljești withdrew.
- Cimentul Bicaz and Gloria Ruginoasa were admitted upon request.

Pos	Team	Pld	W	D	L	GF	GA	GD	Pts	Qualification or relegation
1	Cimentul Bicaz (C, Q)	26	25	1	0	117	15	+102	76	Qualification to promotion play-off
2	Voința Ion Creangă	26	19	3	4	108	31	+77	60	
3	Speranța Răucești	26	18	3	5	62	37	+25	57	
4	Unirea Trifești	26	16	5	5	67	27	+40	53	
5	Roman	26	16	4	6	103	46	+57	52	
6	Spartanii Săbăoani	26	11	4	11	52	63	−11	37	
7	Voința Dochia	26	11	2	13	64	84	−20	35	
8	Ozana Timișești	26	11	0	15	69	69	0	33	
9	Borussia Pângărați	26	10	1	15	60	87	−27	31	
10	Girov	26	8	2	16	51	83	−32	26	
11	Viitorul Podoleni	26	7	3	16	49	77	−28	24	
12	Grumăzești	26	6	4	16	42	77	−35	22 (Note: Grumăzești are ahead of Gloria Ruginoasa on head-to-head points: Gloria Ruginoasa 0–1 Grumăzești, Grumăzești 5–2 Gloria Ruginoasa.)	
13	Gloria Ruginoasa	26	7	1	18	40	100	−60	22	
14	Unirea Dulcești (Note: Unirea Dulcești withdrew after the first half of the season and lost all matches in the second half 0–3. At the time, they were ranked 14th, with 0 wins, 1 draw, 13 losses, a 17–66 goals, and 1 point.)	26	0	1	25	17	105	−88	1	

Rules for classification: 1) Points; 2) Head-to-head points; 3) Head-to-head goal difference; 4) Head-to-head goals scored; 5) Head-to-head away goals scored; 6) Goal difference; 7) Goals scored.
(C) Champions; (Q) Qualified for the phase indicated

=== Olt County ===
Team changes from the previous season

- Victoria Dobrun (Series II winners) was promoted from Liga V Olt.
- Recolta Urzica (Series I winners) and Valea Oltului Ipotesti (Series III winners) declined promotion from Liga V Olt.
- Academica Balș took Petrolul Potcoava’s place in Liga III.
- Știința Mărunței withdrew.
- Viitorul Rusănești, Voința Schitu and Gladius Dobrosloveni were spared from relegation.
- Viitorul Caracal, Academica Balș II and ACS Voineasa were admitted upon request.

Pos	Team	Pld	W	D	L	GF	GA	GD	Pts	Qualification or relegation
1	Lupii Profa (C, Q)	30	28	1	1	169	27	+142	85	Qualification to promotion play-off
2	Viitorul Caracal	30	22	1	7	84	28	+56	67	
3	Unirea 2024 Radomirești	30	20	6	4	120	28	+92	66	
4	Academica Balș II	30	21	2	7	119	53	+66	65 (Note: Academica Balș II are ahead of Iris Titulescu on head-to-head points: Academica Balș II 5–1 Iris Titulescu, Iris Titulescu 4–2 Academica Balș II.)	
5	Iris Titulescu	30	20	5	5	101	42	+59	65	
6	Viitorul Știința Drăgănești-Olt	30	20	3	7	105	46	+59	63	
7	Oltețul Osica	30	18	4	8	84	41	+43	58	
8	Viitorul Osica de Jos	30	15	2	13	87	72	+15	47	
9	Oltul Slătioara	30	15	1	14	80	82	−2	46	
10	Olt Scornicești	30	9	2	19	48	95	−47	29	
11	Victoria Dobrun	30	8	2	20	55	97	−42	26	
12	Unirea Pârșcoveni	30	7	3	20	65	90	−25	24	
13	Voineasa	30	7	2	21	52	114	−62	23	
14	Viitorul Rusănești (R)	30	5	3	22	47	139	−92	18	Relegation to Liga V Olt
15	Voința Schitu (R)	30	4	2	24	40	128	−88	14	Relegation to Liga V Olt
16	Gladius Dobrosloveni (R)	30	1	1	28	18	192	−174	4	Relegation to Liga V Olt

Rules for classification: 1) Points; 2) Head-to-head points; 3) Head-to-head goal difference; 4) Head-to-head goals scored; 5) Head-to-head away goals scored; 6) Goal difference; 7) Goals scored.
(C) Champions; (Q) Qualified for the phase indicated; (R) Relegated

=== Prahova County ===
Team changes from the previous season

- Teleajenul Vălenii de Munte achieved promotion to Liga III.
- Petrolul 95 Ploiești (17th place) and Unirea Cocorăștii Colț (18th place) were relegated to Liga V Prahova.
- Prahova Nedelea (winners) and ACS Gherghița (runners-up) were promoted from Liga V Prahova.
- AFC Bănești-Urleta withdrew.
- Prahova Nedelea was renamed Aricești Nedelea.

Pos	Team	Pld	W	D	L	GF	GA	GD	Pts	Qualification or relegation
1	Progresul Drăgănești (C, Q)	30	24	5	1	124	30	+94	77	Qualification to promotion play-off
2	Cornu	30	24	2	4	98	34	+64	74	
3	Boldești-Scăeni	30	22	6	2	86	16	+70	72	
4	Comarnic	30	21	4	5	92	31	+61	67	
5	Câmpina	30	21	2	7	113	49	+64	65	
6	Avântul Măneciu	30	16	2	12	90	56	+34	50	
7	Gherghița	30	14	5	11	74	56	+18	47	
8	Aricești Nedelea	30	13	2	15	65	47	+18	41	
9	Petrosport Ploiești	30	10	3	17	49	82	−33	33	
10	Mănești	30	9	5	16	58	74	−16	32 (Note: Mănești are ahead of Valea Călugărească on head-to-head points: Valea Călugărească 3–4 Mănești, Mănești 6–3 Valea Călugărească.)	
11	Valea Călugărească	30	10	2	18	79	104	−25	32	
12	Vărbilău	30	9	3	18	39	69	−30	30	
13	Tineretul Gura Vitioarei	30	8	5	17	52	85	−33	29	
14	Brebu	30	7	2	21	41	98	−57	23	
15	Brazi (R)	30	5	4	21	39	101	−62	19	Relegation to Liga V Prahova
16	Bucov (R)	30	1	0	29	15	182	−167	3	Relegation to Liga V Prahova

Rules for classification: 1) Points; 2) Head-to-head points; 3) Head-to-head goal difference; 4) Head-to-head goals scored; 5) Head-to-head away goals scored; 6) Goal difference; 7) Goals scored.
(C) Champions; (Q) Qualified for the phase indicated; (R) Relegated

=== Satu Mare County ===
Team changes from the previous season

- Unirea Tășnad achieved promotion to Liga III.
- Știința Beltiug (9th place; withdrew) and ACS Botiz (10th place; withdrew) were relegated to Liga V Satu Mare.
- Someșul Odoreu (Series A winners) was promoted from Liga V Satu Mare.
- Crasna Moftinu Mic (Series A winners) declined promotion from Liga V Satu Mare.
- Fortuna Căpleni withdrew.
- Unirea Tășnad II was admitted upon request.

Pos	Team	Pld	W	D	L	GF	GA	GD	Pts	Qualification or relegation
1	Talna Orașu Nou (C, Q)	21	15	3	3	77	35	+42	48	Qualification to promotion play-off
2	Recolta Dorolț	20	14	1	5	52	29	+23	43	
3	Oașul Negrești-Oaș	21	9	2	10	67	53	+14	29	
4	Someșul Odoreu	21	8	2	11	27	37	−10	26	
5	Turul Micula	20	8	2	10	43	58	−15	26	
6	Victoria Carei	21	6	6	9	40	50	−10	24	
7	Olimpia Satu Mare II	20	6	2	12	36	53	−17	20	
8	Unirea Tășnad II	20	5	4	11	34	61	−27	19	

Updated to match(es) played on 10 June 2026. Source:
Rules for classification: 1) Points; 2) Head-to-head points; 3) Head-to-head goal difference; 4) Head-to-head goals scored; 5) Head-to-head away goals scored; 6) Goal difference; 7) Goals scored.
(C) Champions; (Q) Qualified for the phase indicated

=== Sălaj County ===
Team changes from the previous season

- Unirea Ciocmani-Băbeni (13th place) was relegated to Liga V Sălaj
- CS Hida (East Series winners) was promoted from Liga V Sălaj.
- Rapid Zimbor withdrew.
- Venus Borla (West Series winners) declined promotion.
- Barcău Nușfalău and CS Cehu Silvaniei were admitted upon request.

Pos	Team	Pld	W	D	L	GF	GA	GD	Pts	Qualification or relegation
1	Barcău Nușfalău (C, Q)	26	23	0	3	127	27	+100	69	Qualification to promotion play-off
2	Jibou	26	21	2	3	99	26	+73	65	
3	Inter Cizer	26	19	1	6	102	47	+55	58	
4	Chieșd	26	18	2	6	130	45	+85	56	
5	Unirea Mirșid	26	18	1	7	90	40	+50	55	
6	Someșul Someș-Odorhei	26	13	2	11	58	53	+5	41	
7	Hida	26	11	2	13	59	74	−15	35	
8	Ardealul Crișeni	26	10	1	15	49	85	−36	31	
9	Cetatea Buciumi	26	8	3	15	47	73	−26	27	
10	Cosniciu	26	8	1	17	49	105	−56	25	
11	Cehu Silvaniei	26	7	3	16	32	74	−42	24	
12	Bănișor-Peceiu	26	6	4	16	34	79	−45	22	
13	Venus Giurtelec (R)	25	5	0	20	30	92	−62	15	Relegation to Liga V Sălaj
14	Creaca Jac (R)	25	3	0	22	23	109	−86	9	Relegation to Liga V Sălaj

Rules for classification: 1) Points; 2) Head-to-head points; 3) Head-to-head goal difference; 4) Head-to-head goals scored; 5) Head-to-head away goals scored; 6) Goal difference; 7) Goals scored.
(C) Champions; (Q) Qualified for the phase indicated; (R) Relegated

=== Sibiu County ===
The Liga IV Sibiu was played in two stages: a double round-robin regular season, followed by a championship play-off for the top four teams in a triple round-robin format and a championship play-out for the bottom six teams in a double round-robin format. The last two teams in the play-out were relegated. Teams started the play-off or play-out with half of their regular season points, rounded up, with no other records carried over.

Team changes from the previous season

- Inter Sibiu achieved promotion to Liga III.
- Arsenal Dârlos (10th place), CSO Copșa Mică (11th place), Sparta Mediaș (12th place; withdrew), Recolta Alma (13th place) and Flacăra Gaz-Metan Mediaș (14th place) were relegated to Liga V Sibiu.
- Viitorul Ațel (Mediaș Series winners), Gloria Loamneș (Sibiu Series I winners) and Gloria Păuca (Sibiu Series II winners) declined promotion from Liga V Sibiu.
- AFC Miercurea Sibiului 2021 withdrew.
- CS Săliște, Alma Sibiu and Interstar Sibiu were admitted upon request.

Pos	Team	Pld	W	D	L	GF	GA	GD	Pts	Qualification
1	Bradu	18	12	3	3	43	20	+23	39	Qualification to championship play-off
2	Interstar Sibiu	18	11	5	2	61	18	+43	38	Qualification to championship play-off
3	Agnita	18	12	1	5	65	16	+49	37	Qualification to championship play-off
4	Păltiniș Rășinari	18	11	4	3	68	28	+40	37	Qualification to championship play-off
5	Voința Sibiu	18	9	5	4	35	25	+10	32	Qualification to championship play-out
6	Avrig	18	6	3	9	26	38	−12	21	Qualification to championship play-out
7	Alma Sibiu	18	6	1	11	36	38	−2	19	Qualification to championship play-out
8	Tălmaciu	18	3	6	9	19	52	−33	15	Qualification to championship play-out
9	Quantum/Cuantic Arsenal Sibiu	18	3	0	15	16	76	−60	9	Qualification to championship play-out
10	Săliște	18	2	2	14	22	80	−58	8	Qualification to championship play-out

Rules for classification: 1) Points; 2) Head-to-head points; 3) Head-to-head goal difference; 4) Head-to-head goals scored; 5) Head-to-head away goals scored; 6) Goal difference; 7) Goals scored.

Championship play-off

Pos	Team	Pld	W	D	L	GF	GA	GD	Pts	Qualification
1	Agnita (C, Q)	9	7	0	2	33	6	+27	40	Qualification to promotion play-off
2	Bradu	9	4	1	4	13	16	−3	33	
3	Interstar Sibiu	9	4	0	5	25	18	+7	31	
4	Păltiniș Rășinari	9	2	1	6	14	45	−31	26	

Rules for classification: 1) Points; 2) Head-to-head points; 3) Head-to-head goal difference; 4) Head-to-head goals scored; 5) Head-to-head away goals scored; 6) Goal difference; 7) Goals scored.
(C) Champions; (Q) Qualified for the phase indicated

Championship play-out

Pos	Team	Pld	W	D	L	GF	GA	GD	Pts	Relegation
5	Alma Sibiu	10	8	2	0	49	12	+37	36	
6	Avrig	10	6	1	3	33	12	+21	30	
7	Voința Sibiu	10	2	2	6	7	27	−20	24	
8	Tălmaciu	10	6	0	4	26	16	+10	26	
9	Săliște (R)	10	2	3	5	14	30	−16	13	Relegation to Liga V Sibiu
10	Quantum/Cuantic Arsenal Sibiu (Note: Quantum/Cuantic Arsenal Sibiu was excluded after 5 rounds and lost all remaining matches 0–3.) (R)	10	0	2	8	4	36	−32	7	Relegation to Liga V Sibiu

Rules for classification: 1) Points; 2) Head-to-head points; 3) Head-to-head goal difference; 4) Head-to-head goals scored; 5) Head-to-head away goals scored; 6) Goal difference; 7) Goals scored.
(R) Relegated

=== Suceava County ===
Team changes from the previous season

- Cetatea Suceava achieved promotion to Liga III.
- Zimbrul Siret (11th place) was relegated to Liga V Suceava.
- Bucovina Dărmănești (Series I winners) and Academica Gălănești (Series II winners) were promoted from Liga V Suceava.
- Juniorul Salcea and Juniorul Suceava withdrew.
- Recolta Fântânele (12th place) was spared from relegation.
- CS Vicovu de Sus, Șoimii Gura Humorului II and Viitorul Fălticeni were admitted upon request.

Pos	Team	Pld	W	D	L	GF	GA	GD	Pts	Qualification or relegation
1	Bradul Putna (C, Q)	24	21	3	0	104	8	+96	66	Qualification to promotion play-off
2	Viitorul Fălticeni	24	18	3	3	67	28	+39	57 (Note: Viitorul Fălticeni are ahead of Vicovu de Sus on head-to-head points: Vicovu de Sus 1–1 Viitorul Fălticeni, Viitorul Fălticeni 5–2 Vicovu de Sus.)	
3	Vicovu de Sus	24	18	3	3	57	22	+35	57	
4	Academica Gălănești	24	12	5	7	47	35	+12	41	
5	Viitorul Liteni	24	10	6	8	67	44	+23	36	
6	Minerul Iacobeni	24	10	4	10	52	41	+11	31 (Note: Minerul Iacobeni deducted 3 points.)	
7	Forestierul Frumosu	24	9	3	12	52	64	−12	30	
8	Moldova Drăgușeni	24	9	2	13	43	56	−13	29	
9	Progresul Frătăuții Vechi	24	7	5	12	37	62	−25	26	
10	Bucovina Dărmănești	24	7	3	14	49	75	−26	24	
11	Șoimii Gura Humorului II (Note: Șoimii Gura Humorului II withdrew after 12 rounds and lost all matches in the second half 0–3. At the time, they were ranked 5th, with 6 wins, 0 draws, 6 losses, 30–34 goals, and 18 points.)	24	6	0	18	30	70	−40	18	
12	Recolta Fântânele	24	5	1	18	33	76	−43	16	
13	Dream Team Ipotești (R)	24	4	2	18	32	89	−57	14	Relegation to Liga V Suceava

Rules for classification: 1) Points; 2) Head-to-head points; 3) Head-to-head goal difference; 4) Head-to-head goals scored; 5) Head-to-head away goals scored; 6) Goal difference; 7) Goals scored.
(C) Champions; (Q) Qualified for the phase indicated; (R) Relegated

=== Teleorman County ===
Team changes from the previous season

- CSL Nanov achieved promotion to Liga III.
- Vulturii Mereni (14th place; withdrew) was relegated to Liga V Teleorman.
- CSC Putineiu (winners) and Tineretul Ciolănești (runners-up) were promoted from Liga V Teleorman.
- Atletic Orbeasca was spared from relegation.
- CSM Alexandria II and Young Steaua Alexandria were admitted upon request.

Pos	Team	Pld	W	D	L	GF	GA	GD	Pts	Qualification or relegation
1	Astra Plosca (C, Q)	30	27	1	2	117	25	+92	82	Qualification to promotion play-off
2	Drăgănești-Vlașca	30	21	6	3	127	46	+81	69	
3	Dinamic Kids Videle	30	18	2	10	92	54	+38	56	
4	Viitorul Lunca	30	16	4	10	74	61	+13	52	
5	Steaua Spătărei	30	13	5	12	74	67	+7	44	
6	Putineiu	30	12	6	12	71	62	+9	42	
7	Tineretul Suhaia	30	12	4	14	47	54	−7	40	
8	Rapid Buzescu	30	12	3	15	59	80	−21	39	
9	Seaca	30	10	8	12	59	68	−9	38	
10	Metalul Peretu	30	10	7	13	49	59	−10	37 (Note: Metalul Peretu are ahead of Voința Saelele 2017 on head-to-head points: Metalul Peretu 3–1 Voința Saelele 2017, Voința Saelele 2017 2–2 Metalul Peretu.)	
11	Voința Saelele 2017	30	10	7	13	68	69	−1	37	
12	Atletic Orbeasca	30	10	3	17	59	78	−19	33 (Note: Atletic Orbeasca are ahead of Tineretul Ciolănești on head-to-head goal difference: Atletic Orbeasca 3–5 Tineretul Ciolănești 2017, Tineretul Ciolănești 2–6 Atletic Orbeasca.)	
13	Tineretul Ciolănești	30	10	3	17	84	124	−40	33	
14	Young Steaua Alexandria	30	9	4	17	44	85	−41	31	
15	Avântul Bragadiru (R)	30	9	3	18	57	80	−23	30	Relegation to Liga V Teleorman
16	Alexandria II (R)	30	6	4	20	43	112	−69	22	Relegation to Liga V Teleorman

Rules for classification: 1) Points; 2) Head-to-head points; 3) Head-to-head goal difference; 4) Head-to-head goals scored; 5) Head-to-head away goals scored; 6) Goal difference; 7) Goals scored.
(C) Champions; (Q) Qualified for the phase indicated; (R) Relegated

=== Timiș County ===
Team changes from the previous season

- Avântul Periam was relegated from Liga III.
- Unirea Jimbolia (Series I winners), CSC Săcălaz (Series II winners) and AS Berini (Series III winners) were promoted from Liga V Timiș.
- CSC Liebling, Progresul Ciacova, Cocoșul Orțișoara, Pobeda Stár Bišnov and AS Gelu withdrew.
- AS Recaș was spared from relegation.
- Ripensia Timișoara was admitted upon request.

Pos	Team	Pld	W	D	L	GF	GA	GD	Pts	Qualification or relegation
1	Sânandrei Carani (C, Q)	30	26	2	2	99	28	+71	80	Qualification to promotion play-off
2	Săcălaz	30	20	5	5	77	39	+38	65	
3	Gloria Moșnița Nouă	30	18	5	7	54	31	+23	59	
4	Unirea Sânnicolau Mare	30	13	6	11	54	42	+12	45	
5	Ghiroda II	30	13	4	13	59	58	+1	43	
6	UVT Timișoara	30	11	8	11	53	57	−4	41	
7	Millenium Giarmata	30	11	7	12	67	71	−4	40	
8	Flacăra Parța	30	11	6	13	57	68	−11	39	
9	Belinț	30	10	7	13	45	49	−4	37 (Note: Belinț are ahead of Deta on head-to-head goal difference: Belinț 2–0 Deta, Deta 2–1 Belinț.)	
10	Deta	30	11	4	15	44	62	−18	37	
11	Ripensia Timișoara	30	10	6	14	49	47	+2	36	
12	Lugoj	30	9	8	13	52	55	−3	35	
13	Unirea Jimbolia	30	10	1	19	44	71	−27	31	
14	Recaș	30	8	6	16	52	75	−23	30 (Note: Recaș are ahead of Avântul Periam on head-to-head points: Recaș 0–0 Avântul Periam, Avântul Periam 1–2 Recaș.)	
15	Avântul Periam (R)	30	7	9	14	48	63	−15	30	Relegation to Liga V Timiș
16	Berini (R)	30	7	6	17	37	75	−38	27	Relegation to Liga V Timiș

Rules for classification: 1) Points; 2) Head-to-head points; 3) Head-to-head goal difference; 4) Head-to-head goals scored; 5) Head-to-head away goals scored; 6) Goal difference; 7) Goals scored.
(C) Champions; (Q) Qualified for the phase indicated; (R) Relegated

=== Tulcea County ===
The Liga IV Tulcea County was played in a double round-robin format involving twelve teams, followed by a championship play-off contested by the top four teams in a single round-robin format at a neutral venue. Based on their regular-season positions, the teams started the play-off with bonus points as follows: 1st place – 3 points, 2nd place – 2 points, 3rd place – 1 point, and 4th place – 0 points. Only teams with legal personality and holding a C.I.S. (Certificate of Sports Identity) issued by the Ministry of Youth and Sport were eligible to participate in the play-off.

Team changes from the previous season

- Heracleea Enisala, Viitorul Horia and Partizanul Luncavița withdrew.
- Hamangia Baia and Monumentul Niculițel were admitted upon request.

Pos	Team	Pld	W	D	L	GF	GA	GD	Pts	Qualification
1	Pescărușul Sarichioi	22	20	0	2	82	23	+59	60	Qualification to championship play-off
2	Pelicanul Murighiol	22	18	2	2	94	30	+64	56	Qualification to championship play-off
3	Hamangia Baia	22	17	2	3	87	34	+53	53	Qualification to championship play-off
4	Flacăra Mihail Kogălniceanu	22	16	2	4	105	28	+77	50	Qualification to championship play-off
5	Liceenii Topolog	22	12	0	10	60	68	−8	36	
6	Triumf Cerna	22	10	3	9	57	49	+8	33	
7	Progresul Isaccea	22	10	0	12	63	79	−16	30	
8	Granitul Babadag	22	8	1	13	49	69	−20	25	
9	Monumentul Niculițel	22	6	0	16	43	66	−23	18	
10	Național Somova	22	5	1	16	35	88	−53	16	
11	Luceafărul Slava Cercheză	22	3	2	17	37	107	−70	11	
12	Beroe Ostrov	22	0	1	21	16	87	−71	1	

Rules for classification: 1) Points; 2) Head-to-head points; 3) Head-to-head goal difference; 4) Head-to-head goals scored; 5) Head-to-head away goals scored; 6) Goal difference; 7) Goals scored.

Championship play-off

Pos	Team	Pld	W	D	L	GF	GA	GD	Pts	Qualification
1	Pescărușul Sarichioi (C, Q)	3	2	0	1	9	5	+4	9	Qualification to promotion play-off
2	Hamangia Baia	3	2	0	1	9	7	+2	7	
3	Flacăra Mihail Kogălniceanu	3	2	0	1	7	5	+2	6	
4	Pelicanul Murighiol	3	0	0	3	2	10	−8	2	

Rules for classification: 1) Points; 2) Head-to-head points; 3) Head-to-head goal difference; 4) Head-to-head goals scored; 5) Head-to-head away goals scored; 6) Goal difference; 7) Goals scored.
(C) Champions; (Q) Qualified for the phase indicated

=== Vaslui County ===
The Liga IV Vaslui County was played over two stages. The regular season will consist of a single round-robin tournament featuring twelve teams. At the end of this phase, the top six teams will qualify for the championship play-off, while the bottom six teams will advance to the play-out. Both the play-off and play-out will be contested in a double round-robin format, with teams carrying over all points accumulated during the regular season.

Team changes from the previous season

- Viitorul Rebricea (12th place) was relegated to Liga V Vaslui.
- Voința Perieni (Series II 3rd place and play-off winners) and Star Tătărăni (Series II runners-up and play-off runners-up) were promoted from Liga V Vaslui.
- Știința Delești (Series I winners, play-off 4th place and promotion/relegation play-offs winners) declined promotion from Liga V Vaslui.
- Sporting Banca withdrew.
- Viitorul Văleni and Vitis Șuletea were spared from relegation.

Pos	Team	Pld	W	D	L	GF	GA	GD	Pts	Qualification
1	Hușana Huși	11	10	0	1	55	10	+45	30	Qualification to championship play-off
2	Flacăra Muntenii de Sus	11	8	1	2	31	15	+16	25	Qualification to championship play-off
3	Comstar Vaslui	11	7	1	3	40	15	+25	22	Qualification to championship play-off
4	Voința Perieni	11	7	0	4	29	22	+7	21	Qualification to championship play-off
5	Unirea Dodești	11	6	2	3	42	22	+20	20	Qualification to championship play-off
6	Vulturești	11	5	3	3	29	23	+6	18	Qualification to championship play-off
7	Star Tătărăni	11	3	3	5	29	25	+4	12	Qualification to championship play-out
8	Negrești	11	3	2	6	18	35	−17	11	Qualification to championship play-out
9	Gârceni	11	3	1	7	19	31	−12	10 (Note: Gârceni are ahead of Ghergheleu on head-to-head points: Gârceni 6–3 Ghergheleu.)	Qualification to championship play-out
10	Ghergheleu	11	3	1	7	20	53	−33	10	Qualification to championship play-out
11	Viitorul Văleni	11	2	2	7	10	29	−19	8	Qualification to championship play-out
12	Vitis Șuletea	11	1	0	10	11	53	−42	3	Qualification to championship play-out

Rules for classification: 1) Points; 2) Head-to-head points; 3) Head-to-head goal difference; 4) Head-to-head goals scored; 5) Head-to-head away goals scored; 6) Goal difference; 7) Goals scored.
Notes:

Championship play-off

Pos	Team	Pld	W	D	L	GF	GA	GD	Pts	Qualification
1	Hușana Huși (C, Q)	10	10	0	0	61	10	+51	60	Qualification for promotion play-off
2	Flacăra Muntenii de Sus	10	4	3	3	19	14	+5	40	
3	Comstar Vaslui	10	4	2	4	24	34	−10	36	
4	Unirea Dodești	10	4	3	3	36	30	+6	35	
5	Voința Perieni	10	2	0	8	21	43	−22	27	
6	Vulturești	10	1	2	7	24	54	−30	23	

Rules for classification: 1) Points; 2) Points in the regular season; 3) Head-to-head points; 4) Head-to-head goal difference; 5) Head-to-head goals scored;
6) Head-to-head away goals scored; 7) Goal difference (regular season + play ff); 8) Goals scored (regular season + play off).
(C) Champions; (Q) Qualified for the phase indicated

Championship play-out

Pos	Team	Pld	W	D	L	GF	GA	GD	Pts	Qualification or relegation
7	Star Tătărăni	10	6	1	3	32	17	+15	31	
8	Viitorul Văleni	10	7	0	3	28	15	+13	29	
9	Negrești	10	4	2	4	30	27	+3	25 (Note: Negrești are ahead of Ghergheleu on regular season points.)	Qualification to relegation play-out
10	Ghergheleu	10	5	0	5	26	28	−2	25	Qualification to relegation play-out
11	Gârceni (R)	10	3	0	7	15	31	−16	19	Relegation to Liga V Vaslui
12	Vitis Șuletea (R)	10	3	1	6	15	28	−13	13	Relegation to Liga V Vaslui

Rules for classification: 1) Points; 2) Points in the regular season; 3) Head-to-head points; 4) Head-to-head goal difference; 5) Head-to-head goals scored;
6) Head-to-head away goals scored; 7) Goal difference (regular season + play out); 8) Goals scored (regular season + play out).
(R) Relegated
Notes:

Relegation play-out

The 9th- and 10th-placed teams of Liga IV will face the 3rd- and 4th-placed teams of the Liga V Vaslui County.

Team 1	Agg.	Team 2	1st leg	2nd leg
Victoria Muntenii de Jos	–	Ghergheleu	2–3	–
Negrești	–	Recolta Laza	3–1	–

=== Vâlcea County ===
Team changes from the previous season

- FC Păușești-Otăsău achieved promotion to Liga III.
- Viitorul Voicești (15th place) and Minerul Berbești (16th place; excluded) were relegated to Liga V Vâlcea.
- Viitorul Șirineasa (winners) and CSC Orlești (runners-up) were promoted from Liga V Vâlcea.
- Sporting Drăgășani was admitted upon request.

Pos	Team	Pld	W	D	L	GF	GA	GD	Pts	Qualification or relegation
1	Viitorul Horezu (C, Q)	30	27	2	1	111	15	+96	83	Qualification for promotion play-off
2	Păușești-Măglași	30	26	3	1	125	33	+92	81	
3	Cozia Călimănești	30	24	1	5	105	40	+65	73	
4	Oltețul Alunu	30	22	2	6	122	28	+94	68	
5	Viitorul Budești	30	18	4	8	110	52	+58	58	
6	Băbeni	30	15	7	8	76	57	+19	52	
7	Unirea Tomșani	30	14	4	12	70	69	+1	46	
8	Lotru Brezoi	30	12	5	13	69	84	−15	41	
9	Minerul Costești	30	12	2	16	60	68	−8	38	
10	Sporting Drăgășani	30	11	2	17	82	98	−16	35	
11	Viitorul Șirineasa	30	9	4	17	55	98	−43	31	
12	Gușoeni	30	8	1	21	49	105	−56	25 (Note: Gușoeni are ahead of Orlești on head-to-head goal difference: Gușoeni 1–2 Orlești, Orlești 1–4 Gușoeni.)	
13	Orlești	30	7	4	19	58	109	−51	25	
14	Viitorul Mateești	30	5	5	20	57	131	−74	20	
15	Foresta Malaia (R)	30	4	4	22	50	117	−67	16	Relegation to Liga V Vâlcea
16	Atletic Drăgășani (R)	30	0	2	28	19	114	−95	2	Relegation to Liga V Vâlcea

Rules for classification: 1) Points; 2) Head-to-head points; 3) Head-to-head goal difference; 4) Head-to-head goals scored; 5) Head-to-head away goals scored; 6) Goal difference; 7) Goals scored.
(C) Champions; (Q) Qualified for the phase indicated; (R) Relegated

=== Vrancea County ===
Team changes from the previous season

- Dinamo Tătăranu withdrew.
- CSC Dumbrăveni had withdrawn in the previous season.
- Viitorul Mărășești was renamed CSO Mărășești.
- CSM Focșani was admitted upon request after its withdrawal from Liga III.

Pos	Team	Pld	W	D	L	GF	GA	GD	Pts	Qualification or relegation
1	Victoria Gologanu (C, Q)	26	22	2	2	65	20	+45	68	Qualification for promotion play-off
2	Victoria Gugești	26	21	3	2	98	17	+81	66	
3	Mărășești	26	19	4	3	76	26	+50	61	
4	Sportul Ciorăști	26	18	3	5	91	38	+53	57	
5	Homocea	26	12	5	9	62	45	+17	41	
6	Viitorul Măicănești	26	12	4	10	62	63	−1	40	
7	Panciu	26	10	6	10	42	40	+2	36	
8	Energia Vulturu	26	11	2	13	40	52	−12	35	
9	Viitorul Suraia	26	7	5	14	44	70	−26	26 (Note: Viitorul Suraia are ahead of Gloria Bălești on head-to-head goal points: Gloria Bălești 2–3 Viitorul Suraia, Viitorul Suraia 4–4 Gloria Bălești.)	
10	Gloria Bălești	26	8	2	16	56	65	−9	26	
11	Focșani	26	8	4	14	39	74	−35	28	
12	Căiata	26	3	4	19	26	87	−61	13	
13	Trotușul Ruginești	26	3	3	20	42	100	−58	12 (Note: Trotușul Ruginești are ahead of Național Golești on head-to-head goal points: Național Golești 3–3 Trotușul Ruginești, Trotușul Ruginești 3–0 Național Golești.)	
14	Național Golești	26	3	3	20	19	65	−46	12	

Rules for classification: 1) Points; 2) Head-to-head points; 3) Head-to-head goal difference; 4) Head-to-head goals scored; 5) Head-to-head away goals scored; 6) Goal difference; 7) Goals scored.
(C) Champions; (Q) Qualified for the phase indicated

== See also ==
- 2025–26 Liga I
- 2025–26 Liga II
- 2025–26 Liga III
- 2025–26 Cupa României
