= 1970–71 County Championship =

29th season of the Liga IV, the fourth tier of the Romanian football league

Liga IV
- Season: 1970–71

The 1970–71 County Championship was the 29th season of the Liga IV, the fourth tier of the Romanian football league system. The champions of each county association promoted to Divizia C without promotion play-off. The promotion play-off was not held this season, due to the expansion of Divizia C from next season, from eight series with 16 teams to twelve series of 14 teams.

== County leagues ==
- Alba (AB)
- Arad (AR)
- Argeș (AG)
- Bacău (BC)
- Bihor (BH)
- Bistrița-Năsăud (BN)
- Botoșani (BT)
- Brașov (BV)
- Brăila (BR)
- Bucharest (B)
- Buzău (BZ)
- Caraș-Severin (CS)
- Cluj (CJ)
- Constanța (CT)
- Covasna (CV)
- Dâmbovița (DB)
- Dolj (DJ)
- Galați (GL)
- Gorj (GJ)
- Harghita (HR)
- Hunedoara (HD)
- Ialomița (IL)
- Iași (IS)
- Ilfov (IF)
- Maramureș (MM)
- Mehedinți (MH)
- Mureș (MS)
- Neamț (NT)
- Olt (OT)
- Prahova (PH)
- Satu Mare (SM)
- Sălaj (SJ)
- Sibiu (SB)
- Suceava (SV)
- Teleorman (TR)
- Timiș (TM)
- Tulcea (TL)
- Vaslui (VS)
- Vâlcea (VL)
- Vrancea (VN)

=== Alba County ===
Pos	Team	Pld	W	D	L	GF	GA	GD	Pts	Promotion or relegation
1	Textila Sebeș (C, P)	22	17	4	1	82	8	+74	38	Promotion to Divizia C
2	CIL Blaj	22	18	2	2	66	10	+56	38	
3	CFR Teiuș	22	15	1	6	50	19	+31	31	
4	Olimpia Aiud	22	13	4	5	48	15	+33	30	
5	Constructorul Alba Iulia	22	9	5	8	40	37	+3	23	
6	Minerul Baia de Arieș	22	8	6	8	34	34	0	22	
7	Arieșul Câmpeni	22	7	7	8	44	30	+14	21	
8	Minerul Roșia Montană	22	7	7	8	28	39	−11	21	
9	Șurianu Sebeș	22	9	1	12	34	46	−12	19	
10	Voința Teiuș	22	6	2	14	37	66	−29	14	
11	Auto Alba Iulia	22	1	1	20	8	88	−80	3	
12	Ardeleana Alba Iulia	22	1	0	21	3	82	−79	2	

Rules for classification: 1) Points; 2) Goal difference; 3) Number of goals scored.
(C) Champions; (P) Promoted

=== Arad County ===
Pos	Team	Pld	W	D	L	GF	GA	GD	Pts	Promotion or relegation
1	Gloria Arad (C, P)	28	25	1	2	87	21	+66	51	Promotion to Divizia C
2	Olimpia Arad	28	23	4	1	80	20	+60	50	
3	Crișana Sebiș	28	12	10	6	43	25	+18	34	
4	Victoria Ineu	28	12	8	8	45	34	+11	32	
5	Foresta Arad	28	14	4	10	44	37	+7	32	
6	Stăruința Dorobanți	28	7	12	9	53	52	+1	26	
7	Mureșul Lipova	28	9	7	12	33	45	−12	25	
8	Libertatea Arad	28	9	6	13	40	49	−9	24	
9	Foresta Beliu	28	10	4	14	28	46	−18	24	
10	Frontiera Curtici	28	8	7	13	38	51	−13	23	
11	Progresul Pecica	28	9	4	15	32	41	−9	22	
12	Victoria Chișineu-Criș	28	8	4	16	33	51	−18	20	
13	Banatul Vinga	28	9	2	17	47	69	−22	20	
14	Șiriana Șiria	28	7	5	16	27	68	−41	19	
15	Șoimii Pâncota (Note: Șoimii Pâncota was spared from relegation due to the promotion of Gloria Arad in Divizia C.)	28	6	6	16	31	52	−21	18	Spared from relegation
16	Unirea Gurahonț (Note: Unirea Gurahonț was excluded from the championship after 11 rounds and all its results were canceled.) (R)	0	0	0	0	0	0	0	0	Excluded

Rules for classification: 1) Points; 2) Goal difference; 3) Number of goals scored.
(C) Champions; (P) Promoted; (R) Relegated

=== Argeș County ===
Pos	Team	Pld	W	D	L	GF	GA	GD	Pts	Promotion or relegation
1	Muscelul Câmpulung (C, P)	26	17	5	4	68	22	+46	39	Promotion to Divizia C
2	Vulturii Câmpulung	26	14	8	4	51	20	+31	36	
3	ASA Pitești	26	11	8	7	34	32	+2	30	
4	Forestierul Stâlpeni	26	12	5	9	55	39	+16	29	
5	Rapid Pitești	26	12	4	10	35	34	+1	28	
6	Avântul Curtea de Argeș	26	10	8	8	31	35	−4	28	
7	Topoloveni	26	10	6	10	47	45	+2	26	
8	Textilistul Pitești	26	10	5	11	33	33	0	25	
9	Voința Câmpulung	26	9	6	11	36	38	−2	24	
10	Avântul Rucăr	26	10	3	13	41	42	−1	23	
11	Petrolul Pitești	26	8	7	11	31	37	−6	23	
12	Progresul Pitești	26	9	1	16	37	53	−16	19	
13	Triumful Curtea de Argeș	26	7	5	14	39	69	−30	19	
14	Unirea Costești	26	3	7	16	20	59	−39	13	

Rules for classification: 1) Points; 2) Goal difference; 3) Number of goals scored.
(C) Champions; (P) Promoted

=== Bacău County ===
Pos	Team	Pld	W	D	L	GF	GA	GD	Pts	Promotion or relegation
1	Oituz Târgu Ocna (C, P)	26	20	2	4	77	14	+63	42	Promotion to Divizia C
2	Constructorul Gheorghiu-Dej	26	16	4	6	46	35	+11	36	
3	Victoria URA Bacău	26	13	3	10	75	40	+35	29	
4	Energia Gheorghiu-Dej	26	11	7	8	33	30	+3	29	
5	Partizanul Bacău	26	12	4	10	58	36	+22	28	
6	Petrolistul Dărmănești	26	12	2	12	49	40	+9	26	
7	CEIL Bacău	26	10	5	11	42	42	0	25	
8	Forestierul Agăș	26	10	4	12	39	56	−17	24	
9	Foresta Gheorghiu-Dej	26	8	7	11	30	39	−9	23	
10	Unirea Tricolor Moinești	26	9	5	12	38	48	−10	23	
11	Silvolemn Comănești	26	11	1	14	34	54	−20	23	
12	Gloria Zemeș	26	9	4	13	35	42	−7	22	
13	Minerul Salina Târgu Ocna	26	7	6	13	31	57	−26	20	
14	Avântul Răcăciuni	26	5	4	17	19	73	−54	14	

Rules for classification: 1) Points; 2) Goal difference; 3) Number of goals scored.
(C) Champions; (P) Promoted

=== Bihor County ===
Pos	Team	Pld	W	D	L	GF	GA	GD	Pts	Promotion or relegation
1	Bihoreana Marghita (C, P)	34	28	3	3	100	18	+82	59	Promotion to Divizia C
2	Minerul Bihor	34	26	2	6	100	22	+78	54	
3	Recolta Valea lui Mihai	34	24	4	6	88	18	+70	52	
4	Înfrățirea Oradea	34	17	8	9	53	35	+18	42	
5	Bihorul Beiuș	34	16	7	11	61	47	+14	39	
6	Petrolul Suplac	34	15	5	14	45	47	−2	35	
7	Metalul Oradea	34	13	8	13	46	41	+5	34	
8	Minerul Șuncuiuș	34	15	3	16	55	54	+1	33	
9	Minerul Voivozi	34	14	5	15	52	62	−10	33	
10	Voința Oradea	34	11	8	15	59	61	−2	30	
11	Viitorul Valea lui Mihai	34	10	9	15	42	59	−17	29	
12	Foresta Tileagd	34	11	5	18	54	67	−13	27	
13	Stăruința Săcuieni	34	10	7	17	42	62	−20	27	
14	Crișana Tinca	34	11	5	18	57	79	−22	27	
15	Oțelul Bihor	34	10	6	18	41	70	−29	26	
16	Dacia Oradea	34	7	11	16	39	72	−33	25	
17	Biharea Vașcău	34	10	5	19	34	89	−55	25	
18	Stăruința Aleșd	34	5	5	24	26	91	−65	15	

Rules for classification: 1) Points; 2) Goal difference; 3) Number of goals scored.
(C) Champions; (P) Promoted

=== Bistrița-Năsăud County ===
Pos	Team	Pld	W	D	L	GF	GA	GD	Pts	Promotion or relegation
1	Minerul Rodna (C, P)	27	21	1	5	73	26	+47	43	Promotion to Divizia C
2	Zorile ILF Bistrița	27	21	0	6	70	28	+42	42	
3	Foresta Telciu	27	18	4	5	61	23	+38	40	
4	Hebe Sângeorz-Băi	27	12	9	6	50	32	+18	33	
5	Someșul Rebrișoara	27	13	1	13	51	49	+2	27	
6	Steaua Nimigea	27	12	3	12	52	57	−5	27	
7	Foresta Susenii Bârgăului	27	11	3	13	53	49	+4	25	
8	Victoria Uriu	27	10	3	14	45	57	−12	23	
9	Viticola Dumitra	27	1	1	25	11	77	−66	3	
10	Hârtia Prundu Bârgăului	27	1	1	25	9	77	−68	3	

Rules for classification: 1) Points; 2) Goal difference; 3) Number of goals scored.
(C) Champions; (P) Promoted

=== Botoșani County ===
Pos	Team	Pld	W	D	L	GF	GA	GD	Pts	Promotion or relegation
1	Victoria PTTR Botoșani (C, P)	16	12	2	2	64	22	+42	26	Promotion to Divizia C
2	Sănătatea Darabani	16	12	0	4	41	17	+24	24	
3	Siretul Bucecea	16	10	3	3	64	17	+47	23	
4	Confecția Dorohoi	16	7	3	6	34	42	−8	17	
5	Flamura Roșie Botoșani	16	7	2	7	35	42	−7	16	
6	Gloria Frumușica	16	5	3	8	36	46	−10	13	
7	Motorul Botoșani	16	3	3	10	26	53	−27	9	
8	Victoria Nicolae Bălcescu	16	3	3	10	19	43	−24	9	
9	Voința Dorohoi	16	2	1	13	19	61	−42	5	
10	Unirea Săveni (Note: Unirea Săveni withdrew in the first part of the season and all its results were canceled.) (D)	0	0	0	0	0	0	0	0	Withdrew

Rules for classification: 1) Points; 2) Goal difference; 3) Number of goals scored.
(C) Champions; (D) Disqualified; (P) Promoted

=== Brașov County ===
Pos	Team	Pld	W	D	L	GF	GA	GD	Pts	Promotion or relegation
1	Politehnica Brașov (C, P)	26	22	4	0	68	8	+60	48	Promotion to Divizia C
2	ICIM Brașov	26	15	8	3	54	16	+38	38	
3	Măgura Codlea	26	11	11	4	30	18	+12	33	
4	Textila Prejmer	26	12	5	9	28	21	+7	29	
5	Hidromecanica Brașov	26	7	12	7	25	25	0	26	
6	Utilajul Făgăraș	26	10	6	10	23	27	−4	26	
7	Precizia Săcele	26	8	9	9	37	29	+8	25	
8	Prefabricate Brașov	26	8	9	9	23	24	−1	25	
9	Olimpia Sânpetru	26	10	5	11	20	29	−9	25	
10	Victoria Bod	26	6	12	8	26	26	0	24	
11	Celuloza Zărnești	26	7	8	11	28	37	−9	22	
12	CFR Brașov	26	8	6	12	23	36	−13	22	
13	Ceramica Feldioara	26	4	5	17	22	48	−26	13	
14	Bazaltul Racoș	26	2	4	20	12	75	−63	8	

Rules for classification: 1) Points; 2) Goal difference; 3) Number of goals scored.
(C) Champions; (P) Promoted

=== Brăila County ===
Pos	Team	Pld	W	D	L	GF	GA	GD	Pts	Promotion or relegation
1	Dunărea Brăila (C, P)	26	13	11	2	52	29	+23	37	Promotion to Divizia C
2	Unirea TUG Brăila	26	16	5	5	48	27	+21	37	
3	Marina Brăila	26	14	5	7	53	27	+26	33	
4	Dacia IDD Brăila	26	13	6	7	45	27	+18	32	
5	Rapid CFR Brăila	20	11	3	6	39	24	+15	25	
6	Tractorul Viziru	20	10	4	6	32	17	+15	24	
7	Mecanizatorul Ianca	20	7	3	10	22	36	−14	17	
8	Comerțul Brăila	20	5	3	12	20	36	−16	13	
9	Săgeata Brăila	20	4	2	14	27	42	−15	10	
10	Avântul Chiscani	20	2	5	13	19	52	−33	9	
11	Gloria Brăila	20	3	1	16	22	59	−37	7	

Rules for classification: 1) Points; 2) Goal difference; 3) Number of goals scored.
(C) Champions; (P) Promoted

=== Bucharest ===
Pos	Team	Pld	W	D	L	GF	GA	GD	Pts	Qualification or relegation
1	Dinamo Obor București (C, P)	30	16	10	4	57	24	+33	42	Promotion to Divizia C
2	IOR București	30	12	13	5	54	37	+17	37	
3	Automatica București	30	12	13	5	38	25	+13	37	
4	ICSIM București	30	14	9	7	29	23	+6	37	
5	Granitul București	30	13	10	7	35	22	+13	36	
6	Tarom București	30	10	13	7	31	22	+9	33	
7	Vâscoza București	30	11	10	9	42	29	+13	32	
8	UREMOAS București	30	12	8	10	44	35	+9	32	
9	Prefabricate București	30	13	4	13	45	43	+2	30	
10	Agronomia București	30	9	12	9	28	28	0	30	
11	Gloria București	30	11	7	12	35	38	−3	29	
12	Triumf București	30	9	9	12	28	37	−9	27	
13	Bere Rahova	30	9	8	13	40	49	−9	26	
14	CIL Pipera	30	8	7	15	36	47	−11	23	
15	Acumulatorul București (Note: Acumulatorul was spared from relegation due to the promotion of Dinamo Obor in Divizia C.)	30	7	5	18	27	37	−10	19	Spared from relegation
16	Avântul 9 Mai (R)	30	3	4	23	22	73	−51	10	Relegation to Bucharest Championship II

Rules for classification: 1) Points; 2) Goal difference; 3) Number of goals scored.
(C) Champions; (P) Promoted; (R) Relegated

=== Buzău County ===
Pos	Team	Pld	W	D	L	GF	GA	GD	Pts	Qualification or relegation
1	Chimia Buzău (C, P)	28	22	4	2	97	18	+79	48	Promotion to Divizia C
2	Industria Sârmei Buzău	28	22	3	3	68	10	+58	47	
3	Foresta Nehoiu	28	19	5	4	78	25	+53	43	
4	Automobilul Buzău	28	19	3	6	67	31	+36	41	
5	Foresta Vernești	28	15	4	9	71	49	+22	34	
6	Recolta Blăjani	28	14	4	10	47	43	+4	32	
7	Recolta Ziduri	28	12	3	13	54	58	−4	27	
8	Viitorul Rușețu	28	8	7	13	48	52	−4	23	
9	Partizanul Râmnicu Sărat	28	8	7	13	28	54	−26	23	
10	Automobilul Pătârlagele	28	9	2	17	36	52	−16	20	
11	Înfrățirea Zoița	28	8	2	18	32	69	−37	18	
12	Spartac Poșta Câlnau	28	7	3	18	45	74	−29	17	
13	Flacăra Buzău (Note: Flacăra Buzău and Partizanul Monteoru were excluded from the championship in the second part of the season.)	28	6	4	18	33	93	−60	16	
14	Partizanul Monteoru	28	5	4	19	33	88	−55	14	
15	Cristalul Buzău	28	4	3	21	28	67	−39	11	

Rules for classification: 1) Points; 2) Goal difference; 3) Number of goals scored.
(C) Champions; (P) Promoted

=== Caraș-Severin County ===
Pos	Team	Pld	W	D	L	GF	GA	GD	Pts	Promotion or relegation
1	Metalul Oțelu Roșu (C, P)	28	20	6	2	78	16	+62	46	Promotion to Divizia C
2	Minerul Oravița	28	21	2	5	73	15	+58	44	
3	Minerul Dognecea	28	15	5	8	65	30	+35	35	
4	Foresta Caransebeș	28	12	9	7	34	37	−3	33	
5	Metalul Bocșa	28	13	5	10	44	29	+15	31	
6	Nera Bozovici	28	14	3	11	37	41	−4	31	
7	Foresta Zăvoi	28	14	3	11	42	44	−2	31	
8	Siderurgistul Reșița	28	10	8	10	45	30	+15	28	
9	Muncitorul Reșița	28	10	6	12	41	52	−11	26	
10	CFR IRTA Oravița	28	11	2	15	42	48	−6	24	
11	Minerul Ocna de Fier	28	9	6	13	43	49	−6	24	
12	Energia Reșița	28	8	6	14	32	46	−14	22	
13	Bistra Glimboca	28	7	6	15	27	74	−47	20	
14	Electrica Reșița	28	7	4	17	34	64	−30	18	
15	Autotransport Moldova Nouă	28	3	3	22	25	97	−72	9	Relegation to Caraș-Severin County Championship II

Rules for classification: 1) Points; 2) Goal difference; 3) Number of goals scored.
(C) Champions; (P) Promoted

=== Cluj County ===
Pos	Team	Pld	W	D	L	GF	GA	GD	Pts	Promotion or relegation
1	Tehnofrig Cluj-Napoca (C, P)	30	23	6	1	78	19	+59	52	Promotion to Divizia C
2	Libertatea Cluj-Napoca	30	16	9	5	70	35	+35	41	
3	Cimentul Turda	30	14	8	8	53	32	+21	36	
4	IOTC Cluj-Napoca	30	14	6	10	48	41	+7	34	
5	Minerul Aghireș	30	13	6	11	46	54	−8	32	
6	CFR Dej	30	12	7	11	57	49	+8	31	
7	Vlădeasa Huedin	30	13	5	12	49	43	+6	31	
8	Unirea Florești	30	10	10	10	43	38	+5	30	
9	Flacăra Cluj-Napoca	30	13	4	13	38	39	−1	30	
10	Carbochim Cluj-Napoca	30	12	6	12	46	47	−1	30	
11	Locomotiva 16 Februarie Cluj-Napoca	30	10	9	11	49	39	+10	29	
12	Motorul IRA Cluj-Napoca	30	9	9	12	35	45	−10	27	
13	Vulturul Mintiu Gherlii	30	11	3	16	39	64	−25	25	
14	Electrometal Cluj-Napoca	30	7	7	16	34	53	−19	21	
15	Someșul Gherla	30	8	3	19	34	79	−45	19	
16	Izolatorul Turda	30	4	4	22	14	56	−42	12	

Rules for classification: 1) Points; 2) Goal difference; 3) Number of goals scored.
(C) Champions; (P) Promoted

=== Constanța County ===
Pos	Team	Pld	W	D	L	GF	GA	GD	Pts	Promotion or relegation
1	Șantierul Naval Constanța (C, P)	30	19	5	6	58	21	+37	43	Promotion to Divizia C
2	ITC Constanța	30	18	6	6	67	29	+38	42	
3	Olimpia Constanța	30	16	8	6	54	21	+33	40	
4	Metalul Mangalia	30	14	7	9	55	31	+24	35	
5	Petrolul Constanța	30	12	10	8	52	35	+17	34	
6	Voința Constanța	30	13	8	9	39	32	+7	34	
7	Recolta Negru Vodă	30	12	9	9	49	36	+13	33	
8	Știința Constanța	30	8	15	7	35	39	−4	31	
9	Victoria Medgidia	30	12	6	12	41	40	+1	30	
10	Ideal Cernavodă	30	13	4	13	40	44	−4	30	
11	Victoria Saligny	30	10	9	11	29	40	−11	29	
12	Viitorul Cobadin	30	12	4	14	37	42	−5	28	
13	CFR Constanța	30	8	5	17	36	54	−18	21	
14	Tractorul Chirnogeni	30	7	6	17	22	67	−45	20	
15	Chimia Năvodari	30	6	5	19	26	59	−33	17	
16	Textila Constanța	30	4	5	21	27	77	−50	13	

Rules for classification: 1) Points; 2) Goal difference; 3) Number of goals scored.
(C) Champions; (P) Promoted

=== Covasna County ===
Pos	Team	Pld	W	D	L	GF	GA	GD	Pts	Promotion or relegation
1	Carpați Covasna (C, P)	25	19	3	3	84	13	+71	41	Promotion to Divizia C
2	Venus Ozun	24	14	4	6	59	31	+28	32	
3	Unirea Sfantu Gheorghe	24	13	5	6	43	25	+18	31	
4	Minerul Baraolt	24	12	5	7	59	29	+30	29	
5	Aprovizionarea Valea Crișului	24	12	4	8	41	43	−2	28	
6	Carpați Sfantu Gheorghe	24	8	8	8	27	35	−8	24	
7	Unirea Reci	24	8	7	9	41	50	−9	23	
8	Oltul Coșeni	24	9	3	12	44	43	+1	21	
9	Oltul Chilieni	24	9	3	12	39	40	−1	21	
10	Înainte Tălișoara	24	8	1	15	32	66	−34	17	
11	Venus Zăbala	24	8	0	16	44	75	−31	16	
12	Recolta Tamașfalău	24	6	3	15	32	47	−15	15	
13	Progresul Catalina	24	6	2	16	32	80	−48	14	

Rules for classification: 1) Points; 2) Goal difference; 3) Number of goals scored.
(C) Champions; (P) Promoted

=== Dâmbovița County ===
Pos	Team	Pld	W	D	L	GF	GA	GD	Pts	Promotion or relegation
1	Metalul Mija (C, P)	28	20	5	3	73	25	+48	45	Promotion to Divizia C
2	Victoria Moreni	28	16	5	7	66	40	+26	37	
3	Cimentul Fieni	28	13	6	9	64	47	+17	32	
4	Progresul Pucioasa	28	11	4	13	53	61	−8	26	
5	Chimia Găești	28	8	8	12	40	39	+1	24	
6	Bradul Moroeni	28	9	4	15	37	73	−36	22	
7	Ciocanul Târgoviște	28	8	4	16	40	64	−24	20	
8	Textila Pucioasa	28	7	4	17	40	64	−24	18	

Rules for classification: 1) Points; 2) Goal difference; 3) Number of goals scored.
(C) Champions; (P) Promoted

=== Dolj County ===
Series I

Pos	Team	Pld	W	D	L	GF	GA	GD	Pts	Qualification or relegation
1	Progresul Băilești (Q)	26	18	8	0	92	17	+75	44	Qualification to championship final
2	CFR Craiova	26	20	4	2	89	19	+70	44	
3	Metalul Craiova	26	14	4	8	48	30	+18	32	
4	Unirea Goicea Mare	26	13	4	9	65	42	+23	30	
5	Victoria Craiova	26	13	2	11	78	43	+35	28	
6	Recolta Dăbuleni	26	12	4	10	63	45	+18	28	
7	Progresul Segarcea	26	10	7	9	50	35	+15	27	
8	Chimia Craiova	26	9	8	9	41	41	0	26	
9	Avântul Filiași	26	11	4	11	46	60	−14	26	
10	Recolta Afumați	26	8	3	15	29	52	−23	19	
11	Confecția Craiova	26	6	7	13	29	60	−31	19	
12	Recolta Urzicuța	26	7	1	18	23	69	−46	15	
13	Dunărea Dioști	26	6	2	18	24	80	−56	14	
14	Avântul Vârvoru de Jos	26	5	2	19	38	122	−84	12	

Rules for classification: 1) Points; 2) Goal difference; 3) Number of goals scored.
(Q) Qualified for the phase indicated

Series II

Pos	Team	Pld	W	D	L	GF	GA	GD	Pts	Qualification or relegation
1	Constructorul Craiova (Q)	26	20	4	2	72	17	+55	44	Qualification to championship final
2	Aripile Craiova	26	18	4	4	72	22	+50	40	
3	Progresul Goicea Mică	26	17	2	7	67	32	+35	36	
4	Dunărea Bistreț	26	15	5	6	60	26	+34	35	
5	Automobilul URA Craiova	26	13	7	6	42	19	+23	33	
6	Avântul Bârca	26	11	9	6	56	29	+27	31	
7	Rovine Craiova	26	11	5	10	38	35	+3	27	
8	Fulgerul Maglavit	26	9	5	12	42	50	−8	23	
9	Recolta Covei	26	9	4	13	41	57	−16	22	
10	Avântul Rast	26	8	4	14	39	55	−16	20	
11	Betonul Craiova	26	7	5	14	36	42	−6	19	
12	Eruga Siliștea Crucii	26	7	1	18	26	81	−55	15	
13	Tractorul Cetate	26	5	1	20	25	80	−55	11	
14	Jiul Gângiova	26	4	0	22	19	96	−77	8	

Rules for classification: 1) Points; 2) Goal difference; 3) Number of goals scored.
(Q) Qualified for the phase indicated

Championship final

The matches was played on 6 and 13 June 1971.

Team 1	Agg.	Team 2	1st leg	2nd leg
Progresul Băilești	4–0	Constructorul Craiova	3–0	1–0

Progresul Băilești won the Dolj County Championship and promoted to Divizia C.

=== Galați County ===
Pos	Team	Pld	W	D	L	GF	GA	GD	Pts	Promotion or relegation
1	Gloria Tecuci (C, P)	30	24	4	2	85	17	+68	52	Promotion to Divizia C
2	Tractorul Galați	30	22	7	1	80	20	+60	51	
3	Electrica Galați	30	15	9	6	62	37	+25	39	
4	Metalosport Galați	30	14	7	9	49	36	+13	35	
5	Automobilul Galați	30	14	6	10	62	28	+34	34	
6	Trefilorul Galați	30	12	9	9	59	60	−1	33	
7	Mecanizatorul Târgu Bujor	30	13	5	12	66	56	+10	31	
8	Foresta Șendreni	30	12	7	11	55	59	−4	31	
9	Tehnometal Galați	30	10	10	10	58	47	+11	30	
10	Mobila Galați	30	10	6	14	43	58	−15	26	
11	Olimpia Galați	30	8	7	15	32	66	−34	23	
12	Victoria IGL Galați	30	8	5	17	38	53	−15	21	
13	Victoria TC Galați	30	8	5	17	47	68	−21	21	
14	Viitorul Berești (R)	30	8	2	20	38	81	−43	18	Relegation to Galați County Championship II
15	Recolta Tudor Vladimirescu (R)	30	7	4	19	26	74	−48	18	Relegation to Galați County Championship II
16	FC Galați II (R)	30	6	3	21	34	74	−40	15	Relegation to Galați County Championship II

Rules for classification: 1) Points; 2) Goal difference; 3) Number of goals scored.
(C) Champions; (P) Promoted; (R) Relegated

=== Gorj County ===
Pos	Team	Pld	W	D	L	GF	GA	GD	Pts	Promotion or relegation
1	Minerul Rovinari (C, P)	28	22	3	3	101	21	+80	47	Promotion to Divizia C
2	Gorjul Târgu Jiu	28	22	3	3	72	16	+56	47	
3	Cimentul Târgu Jiu	28	18	6	4	95	22	+73	42	
4	Metalurgistul Sadu	28	15	2	11	63	46	+17	32	
5	Petrolul Țicleni	28	10	3	15	44	60	−16	23	
6	Gilortul Târgu Cărbunești	28	7	2	19	32	81	−49	16	
7	Voința Târgu Jiu	28	5	0	23	24	121	−97	10	
8	TCMM Rovinari	28	3	1	24	22	86	−64	7	

Rules for classification: 1) Points; 2) Goal difference; 3) Number of goals scored.
(C) Champions; (P) Promoted

=== Harghita County ===
Pos	Team	Pld	W	D	L	GF	GA	GD	Pts	Promotion or relegation
1	Minerul Miercurea Ciuc (C, P)	18	14	2	2	46	14	+32	30	Promotion to Divizia C
2	Harghita Odorheiu Secuiesc	18	13	1	4	73	22	+51	27	
3	Mureșul Toplița	18	10	3	5	45	21	+24	23	
4	Flamura Roșie Miercurea Ciuc	18	8	3	7	39	29	+10	19	
5	Rapid Ciceu	18	8	2	8	36	33	+3	18	
6	Tricotajul Miercurea Ciuc	18	7	2	9	32	48	−16	16	
7	Apemin Borsec	18	6	4	8	28	43	−15	16	
8	Minerul Chileni	18	5	5	8	42	35	+7	15	
9	Complexul Gălăuțaș	18	5	1	12	33	67	−34	11	
10	Bastionul Lăzarea	18	1	3	14	14	76	−62	5	

Rules for classification: 1) Points; 2) Goal difference; 3) Number of goals scored.
(C) Champions; (P) Promoted

=== Hunedoara County ===
Pos	Team	Pld	W	D	L	GF	GA	GD	Pts	Promotion or relegation
1	Constructorul Hunedoara (C, P)	26	19	4	3	58	13	+45	42	Promotion to Divizia C
2	Parângul Lonea	26	18	3	5	74	31	+43	39	
3	Dacia Orăștie	26	17	3	6	70	24	+46	37	
4	Preparatorul Petrila	26	15	4	7	50	28	+22	34	
5	Constructorul Lupeni	26	16	1	9	54	43	+11	33	
6	Minerul Vulcan	26	12	3	11	47	45	+2	27	
7	Aurul Certej	26	12	1	13	44	52	−8	25	
8	IGCL Hunedoara	26	11	3	12	37	47	−10	25	
9	Energia Deva	26	10	4	12	47	46	+1	24	
10	Minerul Aninoasa	26	9	5	12	37	39	−2	23	
11	Gloria Hațeg	26	9	2	15	33	44	−11	20	
12	Energia Paroșeni	26	8	2	16	41	65	−24	18	
13	Preparatorul Lupeni	26	6	2	18	28	58	−30	14	
14	Recolta Unirea (R)	26	2	0	24	21	103	−82	4	Relegation to Hunedoara County Championship II

Rules for classification: 1) Points; 2) Goal difference; 3) Number of goals scored.
(C) Champions; (P) Promoted; (R) Relegated

=== Ialomița County ===
Pos	Team	Pld	W	D	L	GF	GA	GD	Pts	Promotion or relegation
1	Victoria Lehliu	30	22	6	2	66	23	+43	50	Promotion to Divizia C
2	Locomotiva Fetești	30	19	7	4	64	21	+43	45	
3	Viticola Fetești	30	17	9	4	66	29	+37	43	
4	Olimpia Călărași	30	17	7	6	71	32	+39	41	
5	Metalul Ciulnița	30	15	7	8	50	31	+19	37	
6	Victoria Dragoș Vodă	30	14	7	9	57	42	+15	35	
7	Uleiul Slobozia	30	12	5	13	57	60	−3	29	
8	Victoria Munteni-Buzău	30	12	5	13	46	54	−8	29	
9	Steaua Lehliu	30	13	2	15	53	66	−13	28	
10	Victoria Bordușani	30	11	4	15	49	74	−25	26	
11	Unirea Sărățeni	30	10	5	15	38	44	−6	25	
12	Căzănești	30	9	7	14	53	65	−12	25	
13	Avântul Dor Mărunt	30	8	8	14	48	62	−14	24	
14	Victoria Țăndărei	30	8	4	18	43	59	−16	20	
15	Zarea Cuza Vodă	30	4	6	20	25	71	−46	14	
16	Chimia Slobozia	30	3	3	24	22	75	−53	9	

Rules for classification: 1) Points; 2) Goal difference; 3) Number of goals scored.

=== Iași County ===
Pos	Team	Pld	W	D	L	GF	GA	GD	Pts	Promotion or relegation
1	Constructorul Iași (C, P)	28	21	5	2	75	17	+58	47	Promotion to Divizia C
2	Voința Iași	28	19	5	4	76	17	+59	43	
3	Siderurgistul Iași	28	18	4	6	70	33	+37	40	
4	Recolta Ruginoasa	28	13	6	9	58	49	+9	32	
5	Viitorul Târgu Frumos	28	14	1	13	45	41	+4	29	
6	Montajul Iași	28	7	2	19	32	69	−37	16	
7	Panificația Iași	28	4	0	24	24	102	−78	8	
8	Recolta Podu Iloaiei	28	3	1	24	16	80	−64	7	

Rules for classification: 1) Points; 2) Goal difference; 3) Number of goals scored.
(C) Champions; (P) Promoted

=== Ilfov County ===
Pos	Team	Pld	W	D	L	GF	GA	GD	Pts	Promotion or relegation
1	Aurora Urziceni (C, P)	30	23	4	3	83	21	+62	50	Promotion to Divizia C
2	CAP Ciorogârla	30	19	6	5	84	20	+64	44	
3	Argeșul 30 Decembrie	30	14	5	11	63	64	−1	33	
4	Viitorul Dragomirești	30	13	6	11	53	44	+9	32	
5	Argeșul Hotarele	30	13	6	11	72	68	+4	32	
6	Unirea Gârbovi	30	13	5	12	51	45	+6	31	
7	Cinematografia Buftea	30	14	3	13	56	56	0	31	
8	CFR ITA Giurgiu	30	11	8	11	53	46	+7	30	
9	Gloria Fundeni	30	12	5	13	55	43	+12	29	
10	Avântul Cosoba	30	11	5	14	43	74	−31	27	
11	ITA București	30	12	2	16	75	50	+25	26	
12	Gloria Comana	30	12	2	16	46	75	−29	26	
13	Stejarul Gruiu	30	11	3	16	37	67	−30	25	
14	Recolta Brezoaele	30	12	0	18	46	64	−18	24	
15	Steaua Roșie Ulmeni	30	10	3	17	44	67	−23	23	
16	ICAB Arcuda	30	7	3	20	40	87	−47	17	

Rules for classification: 1) Points; 2) Goal difference; 3) Number of goals scored.
(C) Champions; (P) Promoted

=== Maramureș County ===
Pos	Team	Pld	W	D	L	GF	GA	GD	Pts	Promotion or relegation
1	Minerul Cavnic (C, P)	24	19	4	1	69	12	+57	42	Promotion to Divizia C
2	Minerul Băița	24	17	4	3	82	27	+55	38	
3	Minerul Baia Borșa	24	16	4	4	80	23	+57	36	
4	Minerul Băiuț	24	14	5	5	61	24	+37	33	
5	Avântul Baia Mare	24	11	5	8	49	27	+22	27	
6	Unirea Seini	24	9	7	8	38	42	−4	25	
7	Lăpușul Târgu Lăpuș	24	9	6	9	31	45	−14	24	
8	CSU Baia Mare	24	7	6	11	34	45	−11	20	
9	Voința Sighetu Marmației	24	6	8	10	34	57	−23	20	
10	Olimpia Baia Mare	24	5	6	13	22	70	−48	16	
11	Forestiera Câmpulung la Tisa	24	6	3	15	22	60	−38	15	
12	Progresul Șomcuta Mare	24	4	0	20	9	54	−45	8	
13	Tricoul Roșu Sighetu Marmației	24	2	2	20	14	65	−51	6	

Rules for classification: 1) Points; 2) Goal difference; 3) Number of goals scored.
(C) Champions; (P) Promoted

=== Mehedinți County ===
Pos	Team	Pld	W	D	L	GF	GA	GD	Pts	Promotion or relegation
1	Progresul Strehaia (C, P)	27	23	0	4	137	27	+110	46	Promotion to Divizia C
2	Cutezătorii Orșova	27	17	4	6	76	41	+35	38	
3	Tractorul Strehaia	27	17	3	7	81	33	+48	37	
4	CIL Drobeta-Turnu Severin	27	16	2	9	60	32	+28	34	
5	IMA Șimian	27	13	3	11	50	51	−1	29	
6	Viitorul Cujmir	27	12	3	12	50	66	−16	27	
7	Victoria Vânju Mare	27	12	2	13	44	56	−12	26	
8	Cerna Baia de Aramă	27	12	1	14	57	58	−1	25	
9	Unirea Orșova	27	7	7	13	43	59	−16	21	
10	Recolta Voloiac	27	5	0	22	28	123	−95	10	
11	Autobuzul Ieșelnița	27	4	1	22	20	86	−66	9	
12	Unirea Vânători	27	1	2	24	20	86	−66	4	

Rules for classification: 1) Points; 2) Goal difference; 3) Number of goals scored.
(C) Champions; (P) Promoted

=== Mureș County ===
Pos	Team	Pld	W	D	L	GF	GA	GD	Pts	Promotion or relegation
1	Viitorul Târgu Mureș (C, P)	30	18	10	2	66	24	+42	46	Promotion to Divizia C
2	Lacul Ursu Sovata	30	15	7	8	49	40	+9	37	
3	Voința Târnăveni	30	12	6	12	65	54	+11	30	
4	Mureșul Luduș	30	14	2	14	60	61	−1	30	
5	Lemnarul Târgu Mureș	30	10	9	11	41	39	+2	29	
6	Gloria Târgu Mureș	30	10	9	11	33	39	−6	29	
7	Tractorul Sărmașu	30	13	3	14	44	54	−10	29	
8	Oțelul Târgu Mureș	30	11	6	13	50	44	+6	28	
9	Voința Miercurea Nirajului	30	11	6	13	42	40	+2	28	
10	Avântul Reghin	30	11	6	13	35	40	−5	28	
11	Energia Iernut	30	9	10	11	42	50	−8	28	
12	Comerțul Târgu Mureș	30	10	8	12	41	50	−9	28	
13	Fabrica de Zahăr Târgu Mureș	30	8	12	10	33	42	−9	28	
14	Energia Fântânele	30	12	4	14	30	41	−11	28	
15	Oțelul Reghin	30	9	9	12	33	36	−3	27	
16	Dermagant Târgu Mureș	30	11	5	14	41	51	−10	27	

Rules for classification: 1) Points; 2) Goal difference; 3) Number of goals scored.
(C) Champions; (P) Promoted

=== Neamț County ===
Pos	Team	Pld	W	D	L	GF	GA	GD	Pts	Promotion or relegation
1	Danubiana Roman (C, P)	22	16	4	2	56	10	+46	36	Promotion to Divizia C
2	Relonul Săvinești	22	16	3	3	59	17	+42	35	
3	Celuloza Piatra Neamț	22	12	7	3	32	12	+20	31	
4	Bradul Roznov	22	10	5	7	31	24	+7	25	
5	Constructorul Piatra Neamț	22	9	5	8	36	35	+1	23	
6	Metalul Piatra Neamț	22	10	3	9	33	33	0	23	
7	Volanul Bicaz	22	7	5	10	28	28	0	19	
8	Autobuzul Piatra Neamț	22	6	7	9	39	35	+4	19	
9	Betonul Roman	22	7	4	11	32	48	−16	18	
10	Hârtia Piatra Neamț	22	6	4	12	32	35	−3	16	
11	Industria Locală Piatra Neamț	22	5	3	14	33	60	−27	13	
12	Cetatea Targu Neamț	22	1	4	17	8	67	−59	6	

Rules for classification: 1) Points; 2) Goal difference; 3) Number of goals scored.
(C) Champions; (P) Promoted

=== Olt County ===
Pos	Team	Pld	W	D	L	GF	GA	GD	Pts	Promotion or relegation
1	Rapid Piatra-Olt (C, P)	26	19	1	6	49	31	+18	39	Promotion to Divizia C
2	Constructorul Slatina	24	17	3	4	72	24	+48	37	
3	Recolta Stoicănești	26	16	4	6	59	29	+30	36	
4	FOB Balș	26	16	3	7	62	31	+31	35	
5	Valea Oltului Cilieni	26	14	5	7	41	34	+7	33	
6	Petrolul Potcoava	26	15	1	10	54	35	+19	31	
7	Oltul Slatina	26	8	11	7	40	34	+6	27	
8	Victoria Caracal	26	9	7	10	44	36	+8	25	
9	Știința Drăgănești-Olt	26	10	5	11	44	39	+5	25	
10	Avântul Osica	26	6	6	14	48	57	−9	18	
11	Vedea Văleni	26	7	4	15	34	75	−41	18	
12	Voința Bușca	26	6	2	18	25	71	−46	14	
13	Unirea Turia	26	5	3	18	28	84	−56	13	
14	Victoria Cezieni	26	3	3	20	25	62	−37	9	

Rules for classification: 1) Points; 2) Goal difference; 3) Number of goals scored.
(C) Champions; (P) Promoted

=== Prahova County ===
Pos	Team	Pld	W	D	L	GF	GA	GD	Pts	Promotion or relegation
1	Viitorul Slănic (C, P)	30	19	8	3	52	20	+32	46	Promotion to Divizia C
2	Vagonul Ploiești	30	18	6	6	44	22	+22	42	
3	Petrolul Băicoi	30	15	10	5	39	20	+19	40	
4	Electrica Câmpina	30	16	6	8	50	36	+14	38	
5	Feroemail Ploiești	30	12	8	10	40	30	+10	32	
6	Victoria Mizil	30	9	12	9	37	37	0	30	
7	Metalul Câmpina	30	10	10	10	35	39	−4	30	
8	Rafinăria Teleajen	30	10	7	13	39	41	−2	27	
9	Avântul Măneciu	30	10	7	13	47	54	−7	27	
10	Flacăra Câmpina	30	10	6	14	35	37	−2	26	
11	Geamuri Scăieni	30	8	10	12	31	45	−14	26	
12	UZUC Ploiești	30	9	7	14	31	37	−6	25	
13	Flacăra Ploiești	30	8	8	14	41	43	−2	24	
14	Chimia Valea Călugărească	30	8	7	15	29	42	−13	23	
15	Minerul Vălenii de Munte (Note: Minerul Vălenii de Munte was spared from relegation due to the promotion of Viitorul Slănic in Divizia C.)	30	9	5	16	30	55	−25	23	Spared from relegation
16	Unirea Filipeștii de Pădure (R)	30	5	11	14	21	43	−22	21	Relegation to Prahova County Championship II

Rules for classification: 1) Points; 2) Goal difference; 3) Number of goals scored.
(C) Champions; (P) Promoted; (R) Relegated

=== Satu Mare County ===
Pos	Team	Pld	W	D	L	GF	GA	GD	Pts	Promotion or relegation
1	Voința Carei (C, P)	26	19	6	1	81	20	+61	44	Promotion to Divizia C
2	Spartac Satu Mare	26	18	1	7	72	30	+42	37	
3	Energia Negrești-Oaș	26	15	5	6	62	38	+24	35	
4	Rapid Satu Mare	26	14	4	8	54	39	+15	32	
5	Forestiera Bixad	26	10	8	8	62	48	+14	28	
6	Unirea Tășnad	26	11	5	10	54	35	+19	27	
7	Recolta Urziceni	26	10	5	11	63	44	+19	25	
8	Recolta Dorolț	26	9	4	13	42	59	−17	22	
9	Sticla Poiana Codrului	26	8	4	14	52	72	−20	20	
10	Talna Orașu Nou	26	8	4	14	43	73	−30	20	
11	Victoria Livada	26	7	5	14	45	68	−23	19	
12	Stăruința Berveni	26	7	5	14	29	63	−34	19	
13	Spicul Ardud	26	8	2	16	36	63	−27	18	
14	Recolta Turulung	26	8	2	16	37	80	−43	18	

Rules for classification: 1) Points; 2) Goal difference; 3) Number of goals scored.
(C) Champions; (P) Promoted

=== Sălaj County ===
Pos	Team	Pld	W	D	L	GF	GA	GD	Pts	Promotion or relegation
1	Măgura Șimleu Silvaniei (C, P)	28	20	5	3	72	17	+55	45	Promotion to Divizia C
2	Silvania Cehu Silvaniei	28	17	8	3	65	18	+47	42	
3	Rapid CFR Jibou	28	15	6	7	46	27	+19	36	
4	Minerul Sărmășag	28	11	7	10	48	47	+1	29	
5	Recolta Hida	28	10	6	12	36	63	−27	26	
6	Victoria Zalău	28	7	5	16	29	53	−24	19	
7	Panificația Jibou	28	7	1	20	23	61	−38	15	
8	Constructorul Zalău	28	6	1	21	31	64	−33	13	

Rules for classification: 1) Points; 2) Goal difference; 3) Number of goals scored.
(C) Champions; (P) Promoted

=== Sibiu County ===
Pos	Team	Pld	W	D	L	GF	GA	GD	Pts	Promotion or relegation
1	UPA Sibiu (C, P)	30	21	2	7	59	21	+38	44	Promotion to Divizia C
2	Record Mediaș	30	19	5	6	62	31	+31	43	
3	Carpați Mârșa	30	15	7	8	44	29	+15	37	
4	Unirea Tălmaciu	30	14	8	8	56	36	+20	36	
5	Spartac Mediaș	30	15	4	11	43	49	−6	34	
6	Metalul IO Sibiu	30	13	7	10	37	33	+4	33	
7	Carbosin Copșa Mică	30	12	6	12	45	32	+13	30	
8	Textila Cisnădie	30	13	4	13	48	37	+11	30	
9	Stăruința Mediaș	30	9	10	11	36	44	−8	28	
10	Textila Mediaș	30	9	10	11	38	48	−10	28	
11	Voința Sibiu	30	9	8	13	39	47	−8	26	
12	Construcții Sibiu	30	10	6	14	41	53	−12	26	
13	CFR Sibiu	30	10	4	16	39	51	−12	24	
14	Metalurgica Sibiu	30	9	5	16	35	57	−22	23	
15	Automecanica Mediaș	30	7	7	16	32	56	−24	21	
16	Progresul Agnita	30	5	7	18	30	60	−30	17	

Rules for classification: 1) Points; 2) Goal difference; 3) Number of goals scored.
(C) Champions; (P) Promoted

=== Suceava County ===
Pos	Team	Pld	W	D	L	GF	GA	GD	Pts	Promotion or relegation
1	Avântul Frasin (C, P)	26	18	5	3	65	18	+47	41	Promotion to Divizia C
2	Străduința Suceava	26	17	6	3	69	18	+51	40	
3	Filatura Fălticeni	26	18	2	6	61	29	+32	38	
4	Chimia Bradul Vama	26	16	4	6	58	29	+29	36	
5	Autorapid Suceava	26	15	2	9	57	36	+21	32	
6	Silvicultorul Moldovița	26	10	5	11	37	34	+3	25	
7	Avântul Rădăuți	26	10	5	11	34	44	−10	25	
8	Metalul Suceava	26	9	6	11	38	46	−8	24	
9	Ocrotirea Siret	26	10	1	15	46	51	−5	21	
10	Siretul Dolhasca	26	7	5	14	33	74	−41	19	
11	Bistrița Broșteni	26	7	4	15	33	41	−8	18	
12	Viitorul Liteni	26	6	5	15	31	64	−33	17	
13	Locomotiva Dornești	26	7	2	17	21	56	−35	16	
14	Unirea Câmpulung	26	6	0	20	21	64	−43	12	

Rules for classification: 1) Points; 2) Goal difference; 3) Number of goals scored.
(C) Champions; (P) Promoted

=== Teleorman County ===
North Group

Pos	Team	Pld	W	D	L	GF	GA	GD	Pts	Qualification or relegation
1	Sporting Roșiori (Q)	36	22	9	5	98	37	+61	53	Qualification to championship final
2	Viitorul Drăgănești-Vlașca	36	21	9	6	91	39	+52	51	
3	CFR Roșiori	36	19	7	10	91	60	+31	45	
4	Teleormanul Troianu	36	13	8	15	65	63	+2	34	
5	Secera și Ciocanul Plosca	36	13	8	15	70	81	−11	34	
6	Flamura Roșie Buzescu	36	15	4	17	71	82	−11	34	
7	Șoimii Scrioaștea	36	13	5	18	71	108	−37	31	
8	Viitorul Tătărăștii de Jos	36	11	7	18	62	75	−13	29	
9	Voința Balta Sărată	36	12	5	19	65	82	−17	29	
10	Victoria Vârtoape	36	8	4	24	48	105	−57	20	

Rules for classification: 1) Points; 2) Goal difference; 3) Number of goals scored.
(Q) Qualified for the phase indicated

South Group

Pos	Team	Pld	W	D	L	GF	GA	GD	Pts	Qualification or relegation
1	Cetatea Turnu Măgurele (Q)	32	17	5	10	83	46	+37	39	Qualification to championship final
2	Dunărea Zimnicea	32	16	6	10	75	43	+32	38	
3	Recolta Izvoarele	32	18	2	12	65	43	+22	38	
4	Recolta Segarcea-Vale	32	16	4	12	66	55	+11	36	
5	Flacăra Lița	32	12	9	11	42	38	+4	33	
6	Recolta Piatra	32	14	4	14	65	73	−8	32	
7	Unirea Traian	32	11	6	15	44	61	−17	28	
8	Recolta Poroschia	32	10	5	17	36	62	−26	25	
9	Energia Islaz	32	8	3	21	36	91	−55	19	

Rules for classification: 1) Points; 2) Goal difference; 3) Number of goals scored.
(Q) Qualified for the phase indicated

Championship final

Team 1	Agg.	Team 2	1st leg	2nd leg
Sporting Roșiori	3–2	Cetatea Turnu Măgurele	2–1	1–1

Sporting Roșiori won the Teleorman County Championship and promoted to Divizia C.

=== Timiș County ===
Pos	Team	Pld	W	D	L	GF	GA	GD	Pts	Promotion or relegation
1	Progresul Timișoara	30	20	7	3	61	21	+40	47	Promotion to Divizia C
2	Unirea Sânnicolau Mare	30	20	3	7	59	29	+30	43	
3	Laminorul Nădrag	30	18	5	7	70	37	+33	41	
4	Unirea Tomnatic	30	15	0	15	76	52	+24	30	
5	Politehnica Timișoara II	30	10	10	10	31	34	−3	30	
6	Auto Timișoara	30	10	8	12	45	39	+6	28	
7	Unirea Jimbolia	30	11	6	13	36	39	−3	28	
8	Șoimii Timișoara	30	11	6	13	41	46	−5	28	
9	Ceramica Jimbolia	30	13	1	16	52	51	+1	27	
10	Textila Timișoara	30	12	3	15	40	52	−12	27	
11	Recolta Nerău	30	11	4	15	47	53	−6	26	
12	Comerțul Timișoara	30	10	6	14	43	61	−18	26	
13	Tehnolemn Timișoara	30	10	6	14	43	65	−22	26	
14	Recaș	30	9	8	13	29	58	−29	26	
15	Șoimii Buziaș	30	9	7	14	36	59	−23	25	
16	Progresul Gătaia	30	10	2	18	45	58	−13	22	

Rules for classification: 1) Points; 2) Goal difference; 3) Number of goals scored.

=== Tulcea County ===
Pos	Team	Pld	W	D	L	GF	GA	GD	Pts	Promotion or relegation
1	Granitul Babadag (C, P)	26	19	4	3	81	20	+61	42	Promotion to Divizia C
2	Voința Tulcea	26	17	5	4	56	15	+41	39	
3	Minerul Măcin	26	14	5	7	52	32	+20	33	
4	Recolta Frecăței	26	14	3	9	50	39	+11	31	
5	Pescărușul Sarichioi	26	13	4	9	54	31	+23	30	
6	Minerul Altân Tepe	26	12	6	8	56	45	+11	30	
7	Progresul Nalbant	26	14	2	10	46	41	+5	30	
8	Marina Tulcea	26	12	4	10	45	34	+11	28	
9	Stăruința Baia	26	12	4	10	43	39	+4	28	
10	Rapid Izvoarele	26	11	6	9	33	33	0	28	
11	Flacăra Mihail Kogălniceanu	26	10	4	12	49	42	+7	24	
12	Progresul Isaccea	26	7	2	17	31	73	−42	16	
13	Progresul Tulcea	26	1	2	23	8	74	−66	4	
14	Triumf Cerna	26	0	0	26	3	95	−92	0	

Rules for classification: 1) Points; 2) Goal difference; 3) Number of goals scored.
(C) Champions; (P) Promoted

=== Vaslui County ===
Pos	Team	Pld	W	D	L	GF	GA	GD	Pts	Promotion or relegation
1	Viitorul Vaslui (C, P)	26	23	2	1	128	10	+118	48	Promotion to Divizia C
2	Metalul Bârlad	26	18	4	4	74	28	+46	40	
3	IGO Vaslui	26	15	5	6	58	35	+23	35	
4	Unirea Negrești	26	14	5	7	40	26	+14	33	
5	Avântul Huși	26	12	7	7	54	44	+10	31	
6	Recolta Văleni	26	10	8	8	53	59	−6	28	
7	Hușana Huși	26	11	5	10	46	41	+5	27	
8	Flacăra Murgeni	26	10	3	13	41	57	−16	23	
9	Spartac Bârlad	26	9	3	14	42	57	−15	21	
10	SCMI Vaslui	26	10	1	15	46	65	−19	21	
11	Victoria Muntenii de Jos	26	8	2	16	36	73	−37	18	
12	Rapid Vaslui	26	5	3	18	33	59	−26	13	
13	Recolta Laza	26	4	4	18	23	59	−36	12	
14	Voința Vaslui	26	2	2	22	16	77	−61	6	

Rules for classification: 1) Points; 2) Goal difference; 3) Number of goals scored.
(C) Champions; (P) Promoted

=== Vâlcea County ===
Pos	Team	Pld	W	D	L	GF	GA	GD	Pts	Promotion or relegation
1	Unirea Bujoreni (C, P)	26	22	3	1	74	15	+59	47	Promotion to Divizia C
2	Oltul CIL Râmnicu Vâlcea	26	20	4	2	65	19	+46	44	
3	Păstorul Vaideeni	26	16	2	8	49	30	+19	34	
4	Flacăra Horezu	26	15	1	10	57	31	+26	31	
5	Unirea Băbeni	26	14	3	9	54	37	+17	31	
6	Sănătatea Govora	26	14	2	10	59	34	+25	30	
7	Victoria Frâncești	26	11	5	10	52	61	−9	27	
8	Progresul Bunești	26	10	3	13	42	43	−1	23	
9	Cozia Călimănești	26	11	1	14	37	46	−9	23	
10	Râureni	26	8	4	14	37	56	−19	20	
11	Podgoria Crețeni	26	6	4	16	21	48	−27	16	
12	Flacăra Râmnicu Vâlcea	26	6	2	18	28	54	−26	14	
13	Constructorul Râmnicu Vâlcea	26	5	3	18	28	77	−49	13	
14	Viitorul Băbeni	26	2	3	21	12	70	−58	7	

Rules for classification: 1) Points; 2) Goal difference; 3) Number of goals scored.
(C) Champions; (P) Promoted

=== Vrancea County ===
Pos	Team	Pld	W	D	L	GF	GA	GD	Pts	Promotion or relegation
1	Luceafărul Focșani (C, P)	30	26	3	1	107	20	+87	55	Promotion to Divizia C
2	Foresta Gugești	30	17	8	5	66	25	+41	42	
3	Chimica Mărășești	30	18	1	11	94	37	+57	37	
4	Constructorul Focșani	30	15	6	9	44	40	+4	36	
5	Locomotiva Adjud	24	12	4	8	34	33	+1	28	
6	Flacăra Odobești	24	11	2	11	44	43	+1	24	
7	Foresta Cosmești	24	11	2	11	39	38	+1	24	
8	Victoria Focșani	24	10	4	10	42	46	−4	24	
9	Vrancea Focșani	24	8	3	13	40	50	−10	19	
10	Rapid Panciu	24	6	1	17	40	60	−20	13	
11	Automobilul Adjud	24	6	1	17	22	81	−59	13	
12	Victoria Odobești	24	4	3	17	28	61	−33	11	
13	Trotușul Ruginești	24	4	2	18	27	93	−66	10	

Rules for classification: 1) Points; 2) Goal difference; 3) Number of goals scored.
(C) Champions; (P) Promoted

== See also ==
- 1970–71 Divizia A
- 1970–71 Divizia B
- 1970–71 Divizia C
- 1970–71 Cupa României
