= 1971–72 County Championship =

30th season of the Liga IV, the fourth tier of the Romanian football league

Liga IV
- Season: 1971–72

The 1971–72 County Championship was the 30th season of Liga IV, the fourth tier of the Romanian football league system. The champions of each county association played against those from neighboring counties in a play-off to gain promotion to Divizia C.

== County championships ==
- Alba (AB)
- Arad (AR)
- Argeș (AG)
- Bacău (BC)
- Bihor (BH)
- Bistrița-Năsăud (BN)
- Botoșani (BT)
- Brașov (BV)
- Brăila (BR)
- Bucharest (B)
- Buzău (BZ)
- Caraș-Severin (CS)
- Cluj (CJ)
- Constanța (CT)
- Covasna (CV)
- Dâmbovița (DB)
- Dolj (DJ)
- Galați (GL)
- Gorj (GJ)
- Harghita (HR)
- Hunedoara (HD)
- Ialomița (IL)
- Iași (IS)
- Ilfov (IF)
- Maramureș (MM)
- Mehedinți (MH)
- Mureș (MS)
- Neamț (NT)
- Olt (OT)
- Prahova (PH)
- Satu Mare (SM)
- Sălaj (SJ)
- Sibiu (SB)
- Suceava (SV)
- Teleorman (TR)
- Timiș (TM)
- Tulcea (TL)
- Vaslui (VS)
- Vâlcea (VL)
- Vrancea (VN)

== Promotion play-off ==
Teams promoted to Divizia C without play-off matches, from less represented counties in the third division.

- (VN) Locomotiva Adjud
- (VS) Unirea Tricolor Bârlad
- (AG) Textilistul Pitești
- (DJ) Victoria Craiova
- (AR) Constructorul Arad
- (BH) Minerul Bihor
- (SJ) Rapid Jibou
- (BN) Foresta Susenii Bârgăului

The matches were played on 2 and 9 July 1972.

Team 1	Agg.	Team 2	1st leg	2nd leg
Tractorul Troianu (TR)	2–3	(OT) Recolta Stoicănești	2–1	0–2
Cozia Râmnicu Vâlcea (VL)	2–3	(DB) Chimia Găești	2–0	0–3
Minerul Măcin (TL)	4–4 (Note: Știința Constanța won on the away goals rule.)	(CT) Știința Constanța	1–4	3–0 w/o
CIL Blaj (AB)	5–2	(HD) Dacia Orăștie	5–0	0–2
Minerul Oravița (CS)	2–3	(TM) Unirea Tomnatic	2–0	0–3
Terom Iași (IS)	1–7	(BC) Constructorul Gheorghe Gheorghiu-Dej	1–2	0–5
Textila Cisnădie (SB)	2–7	(BV) ICIM Brașov	1–3	1–4
Mureșul Toplița (HR)	4–2	(CV) Unirea Sfântu Gheorghe	4–1	0–1
Forestiera Bixad (SM)	2–4	(MM) Minerul Borșa	1–1	1–3
Cutezătorii Orșova (MH)	2–7	(GJ) Gorjul Târgu Jiu	1–2	1–5
Relonul Săvinești (NT)	15–6	(GL) Metalosport Galați	12–2	3–4
Comerțul Brăila (BR)	4–4 (Note: Comerțul Brăila won on the away goals rule.)	(BZ) Industria Sârmei Buzău	1–1	3–3
CM Cluj-Napoca (CJ)	0–3	(MS) Lacul Ursu Sovata	0–1	0–2
Viticola Fetești (IL)	1–3	(IF) Sportul Ciorogârla	1–1	0–2
Chimia Brazi (PH)	5–1	(B) UREMOAS București	4–0	1–1
Străduința Suceava (SV)	8–0	(BT) Unirea Săveni	4–0	4–0

== Championships standings ==
=== Alba County ===
Pos	Team	Pld	W	D	L	GF	GA	GD	Pts	Qualification or relegation
1	CIL Blaj	18	13	3	2	41	10	+31	29	Qualification to championship play-off
2	Minerul Baia de Arieș	18	12	4	2	48	15	+33	28	Qualification to championship play-off
3	CFR Teiuș	18	11	2	5	42	20	+22	24	Qualification to championship play-off
4	Olimpia Aiud	18	8	5	5	33	23	+10	21	Qualification to championship play-off
5	Arieșul Câmpeni	18	7	4	7	36	28	+8	18	
6	Constructorul Alba Iulia	18	7	2	9	29	26	+3	16	
7	Minerul Roșia Montană	18	6	2	10	26	43	−17	14	
8	Voința Teiuș	18	5	1	12	17	51	−34	11	
9	Târnava Valea Lungă	18	3	4	11	23	59	−36	10	
10	Moții Abrud	18	3	3	12	22	42	−20	9	

Rules for classification: 1) Points; 2) Goal difference; 3) Number of goals scored.

Championship play-off

The championship play-off was played in a single round-robin tournament. The teams started the play-off with all the records accumulated in the first stage of the season.

Table

Pos	Team	Pld	W	D	L	GF	GA	GD	Pts	Qualification
1	CIL Blaj (C, Q)	21	15	4	2	47	13	+34	49	Qualification to promotion play-off
2	Minerul Baia de Arieș	21	13	5	3	50	17	+33	44	
3	CFR Teiuș	21	11	3	7	44	24	+20	36	
4	Olimpia Aiud	21	9	6	6	38	29	+9	33	

Rules for classification: 1) Points; 2) Goal difference; 3) Number of goals scored.
(C) Champions; (Q) Qualified for the phase indicated

Results

28 May 1972	CFR Teiuș	0–1	Minerul Baia de Arieș

28 May 1972	CIL Blaj	4–2	Olimpia Aiud

4 June 1972	Minerul Baia de Arieș	1–1	CIL Blaj

4 June 1972	Olimpia Aiud	2–2	CFR Teiuș

11 June 1972	CFR Teiuș	0–1	CIL Blaj

11 June 1972	Olimpia Aiud	1–0	Minerul Baia de Arieș

=== Arad County ===
Pos	Team	Pld	W	D	L	GF	GA	GD	Pts	Qualification or relegation
1	Constructorul Arad (C, P)	28	23	1	4	101	21	+80	47	Promotion to Divizia C
2	Crișana Sebiș	28	20	4	4	66	23	+43	44	
3	Victoria Ineu	28	16	7	5	50	30	+20	39	
4	Stăruința Dorobanți	28	13	9	6	65	31	+34	35	
5	FZ Arad	28	14	4	10	58	49	+9	32	
6	Foresta Arad	28	12	5	11	45	42	+3	29	
7	Frontiera Curtici	28	12	4	12	61	65	−4	28	
8	Libertatea Arad	28	12	4	12	44	50	−6	28	
9	Șoimii Pâncota	28	9	7	12	46	41	+5	25	
10	Progresul Pecica	28	8	6	14	36	46	−10	22	
11	Șiriana Șiria	28	9	3	16	34	50	−16	21	
12	Victoria Chișineu-Criș	28	8	5	15	37	61	−24	21	
13	Mureșul Lipova	28	7	6	15	43	72	−29	20	
14	Foresta Beliu	28	4	10	14	37	72	−35	18	
15	Banatul Vinga	28	4	3	21	28	98	−70	11 (Note: Banatul Vinga was spared from relegation due to the promotion of Constructorul Arad to Divizia C.)	Spared from relegation
16	Luptătorul Lipova (R)	0	0	0	0	0	0	0	0 (Note: Luptătorul Lipova was excluded from the championship after 9 rounds and all its results were canceled.)	Expelled

Rules for classification: 1) Points; 2) Goal difference; 3) Number of goals scored.
(C) Champions; (P) Promoted; (R) Relegated

=== Argeș County ===
Pos	Team	Pld	W	D	L	GF	GA	GD	Pts	Promotion or relegation
1	Textilistul Pitești (C, P)	26	19	4	3	68	13	+55	42	Promotion to Divizia C
2	Curtea de Argeș	26	19	1	6	71	39	+32	39	
3	Topoloveni	26	17	5	4	56	27	+29	39	
4	Avântul Rucăr	26	16	4	6	63	33	+30	36	
5	Forestierul Stâlpeni	26	10	8	8	41	36	+5	28	
6	Recolta IAS Costești	26	12	4	10	46	43	+3	28	
7	Vulturii Muscelului Câmpulung	26	11	5	10	37	37	0	27	
8	Petrolul Pitești	26	10	4	12	31	36	−5	24	
9	Rapid Pitești	26	10	1	15	31	50	−19	21	
10	Progresul Pitești	26	7	6	13	28	48	−20	20	
11	ASA Pitești	26	5	8	13	36	53	−17	18	
12	Argeșeana Pitești	26	6	3	17	28	55	−27	15	
13	ITA Câmpulung	26	5	4	17	25	56	−31	14	
14	Muscelul Lerești	26	6	1	19	30	65	−35	13	

Rules for classification: 1) Points; 2) Goal difference; 3) Number of goals scored.
(C) Champions; (P) Promoted

=== Bihor County ===
Pos	Team	Pld	W	D	L	GF	GA	GD	Pts	Promotion or relegation
1	Minerul Bihor (C, P)	34	26	5	3	104	21	+83	57	Promotion to Divizia C
2	Înfrățirea Oradea	34	20	8	6	63	28	+35	48	
3	Unirea Valea lui Mihai	34	20	4	10	87	45	+42	44	
4	Stăruința Aleșd	34	18	6	10	53	40	+13	42	
5	Voința Oradea	34	17	7	10	66	43	+23	41	
6	Forestierul Tileagd	34	17	7	10	60	41	+19	41	
7	Minerul Șuncuiuș	34	15	8	11	76	41	+35	38	
8	Stăruința Săcuieni	34	15	8	11	52	56	−4	37 (Note: Stăruința Săcueni deducted 1 point.)	
9	Crișana Tinca	34	12	10	12	56	61	−5	34	
10	Bihorul Beiuș	34	12	9	13	50	51	−1	33	
11	Minerul Voivozi	34	13	5	16	50	56	−6	31	
12	Flamura Pădurea Neagră	34	12	7	15	41	52	−11	31	
13	Petrolul Suplac	34	10	10	14	35	56	−21	30	
14	Oțelul Petru Groza	34	10	9	15	39	42	−3	29	
15	Voința Marghita	34	10	8	16	54	76	−22	28	
16	Rapid Oradea	34	10	7	17	48	69	−21	27	
17	Biharea Vașcău (R)	34	7	6	21	33	84	−51	20	Relegation to Bihor Championship II
18	Gloria Petru Groza (Note: Gloria Petru Groza withdrew from the championship in the second part of the season and all their results awarded by forfeit.) (E)	34	0	0	34	9	119	−110	0	Expelled

Source: adt.arcanum.com
Rules for classification: 1) Points; 2) Goal difference; 3) Number of goals scored.
(C) Champions; (E) Eliminated; (P) Promoted; (R) Relegated

=== Botoșani County ===
Pos	Team	Pld	W	D	L	GF	GA	GD	Pts	Qualification or relegation
1	Unirea Săveni (C, Q)	18	16	2	0	63	10	+53	34	Qualification to promotion play-off
2	Siretul Bucecea	18	15	1	2	62	20	+42	31	
3	Constructorul Botoșani	18	11	2	5	43	21	+22	24	
4	Rapid Ungureni	18	9	1	8	46	41	+5	19	
5	Gloria Frumușica	18	7	4	7	34	32	+2	18	
6	Flamura Roșie Botoșani	18	7	3	8	34	37	−3	17	
7	Energia Botoșani	18	6	4	8	32	36	−4	16	
8	Progresul Ștefănești	18	4	3	11	26	55	−29	11	
9	Textila Botoșani II	18	1	3	14	20	62	−42	5	
10	Confecția Dorohoi	18	2	1	15	15	61	−46	5	

Rules for classification: 1) Points; 2) Goal difference; 3) Number of goals scored.
(C) Champions; (Q) Qualified for the phase indicated

=== Brașov County ===
Pos	Team	Pld	W	D	L	GF	GA	GD	Pts	Qualification or relegation
1	ICIM Brașov (C, Q)	26	19	5	2	50	13	+37	43	Qualification to promotion play-off
2	CFR Brașov	26	14	5	7	43	28	+15	33	
3	Textila Prejmer	26	13	6	7	35	28	+7	32	
4	Postăvarul Brașov	26	12	6	8	36	23	+13	30	
5	Hidromecanica Brașov	26	10	10	6	32	22	+10	30	
6	Măgura Codlea	26	10	6	10	33	31	+2	26	
7	Precizia Săcele	26	8	9	9	28	19	+9	25	
8	Bucegi Râșnov	26	9	7	10	29	28	+1	25	
9	Victoria Bod	26	8	9	9	23	32	−9	25	
10	Prefabricate Brașov	26	8	8	10	15	24	−9	24	
11	Utilajul Făgăraș	26	7	9	10	27	30	−3	23	
12	Celuloza Zărnești	26	7	8	11	21	27	−6	22	
13	Olimpia Sânpetru	26	7	5	14	21	46	−25	19	
14	Ceramica Feldioara	26	1	5	20	14	56	−42	7	

Rules for classification: 1) points; 2) goal difference; 3) number of goals scored.
(C) Champions; (Q) Qualified for the phase indicated

=== Bucharest ===
Pos	Team	Pld	W	D	L	GF	GA	GD	Pts	Qualification or relegation
1	UREMOAS București (C, Q)	30	16	8	6	48	23	+25	40	Qualification to promotion play-off
2	Automatica București	30	13	14	3	42	22	+20	40	
3	Abatorul București	30	13	10	7	36	31	+5	36	
4	Vâscoza București	30	14	7	9	49	32	+17	35	
5	ICSIM București	30	11	9	10	36	34	+2	31	
6	Bere Rahova București	30	12	5	13	38	45	−7	29	
7	Chimistul București	30	8	12	10	42	45	−3	28	
8	Prefabricate București	30	8	12	10	39	44	−5	28	
9	Acumulatorul București	30	8	12	10	33	46	−13	28	
10	Tarom București	30	11	5	14	39	38	+1	27	
11	IOR București	30	10	7	13	32	36	−4	27	
12	Granitul București	30	9	9	12	31	35	−4	27	
13	Agronomia București	30	10	7	13	31	37	−6	27	
14	CIL Pipera	30	10	7	13	37	43	−6	27	
15	Triumf București (R)	30	7	13	10	26	35	−9	27	Relegation to Bucharest Championship II
16	Gloria București (R)	30	8	7	15	35	48	−13	23	Relegation to Bucharest Championship II

Rules for classification: 1) points; 2) goal difference; 3) number of goals scored.
(C) Champions; (Q) Qualified for the phase indicated; (R) Relegated

=== Caraș-Severin County ===
Pos	Team	Pld	W	D	L	GF	GA	GD	Pts	Qualification or relegation
1	Minerul Oravița (C, Q)	30	23	6	1	73	11	+62	52	Qualification to promotion play-off
2	Metalul Bocșa	30	23	4	3	80	13	+67	50	
3	Siderurgistul Reșița	30	18	2	10	54	28	+26	38	
4	Minerul Dognecea	30	16	4	10	61	38	+23	36	
5	Minerul Ocna de Fier	30	15	6	9	50	47	+3	36	
6	Energia Reșița	30	13	6	11	43	36	+7	32	
7	Nera Bozovici	30	13	2	15	53	49	+4	28	
8	Foresta Zăvoi	30	11	6	13	46	42	+4	28	
9	CFR Oravița	30	11	6	13	46	46	0	28	
10	Metalul Anina	30	11	5	14	47	44	+3	27	
11	Gloria Reșița	30	11	4	15	36	48	−12	26	
12	Bistra Glimboca	30	11	4	15	37	60	−23	26	
13	Muncitorul Reșița	30	11	3	16	31	49	−18	25	
14	Electrica Reșița	30	9	5	16	30	50	−20	23	
15	Recolta Berzovia	30	7	3	20	27	88	−61	17	
16	Foresta Caransebeș	30	2	4	24	13	74	−61	8	

Rules for classification: 1) points; 2) goal difference; 3) number of goals scored.
(C) Champions; (Q) Qualified for the phase indicated

=== Cluj County ===
Pos	Team	Pld	W	D	L	GF	GA	GD	Pts	Qualification or relegation
1	CM Cluj (C, Q)	26	17	4	5	62	18	+44	38	Qualification to promotion play-off
2	Cimentul Turda	26	15	8	3	47	17	+30	38	
3	Libertatea Cluj	26	15	8	3	55	28	+27	38	
4	Motorul URA Cluj	26	15	5	6	47	21	+26	35	
5	Flacăra Cluj	26	14	2	10	54	41	+13	30	
6	Electrometal Cluj	26	9	10	7	35	30	+5	28	
7	Spicul Luna	26	8	7	11	24	43	−19	23	
8	Vulturii Mintiu Gherlii	26	9	4	13	49	46	+3	22	
9	Minerul Aghireș	26	9	3	14	47	70	−23	21	
10	Vlădeasa Huedin	26	7	6	13	47	53	−6	20	
11	Someșul Gherla	26	7	5	14	35	63	−28	19	
12	CFR Dej	26	8	2	16	39	61	−22	18	
13	Unirea Florești	26	7	3	16	29	53	−24	17	
14	Poligrafia Cluj	26	4	9	13	27	52	−25	17	

Rules for classification: 1) points; 2) goal difference; 3) number of goals scored.
(C) Champions; (Q) Qualified for the phase indicated

=== Dâmbovița County ===
Pos	Team	Pld	W	D	L	GF	GA	GD	Pts	Qualification or relegation
1	Chimia Găești (C, Q)	26	21	4	1	73	21	+52	46	Qualification to promotion play-off
2	Cimentul Fieni	26	18	5	3	77	29	+48	41	
3	Victoria Moreni	26	14	4	8	72	37	+35	32	
4	Progresul Pucioasa	26	13	5	8	55	39	+16	31	
5	Unirea Nucet	26	13	3	10	42	38	+4	29	
6	Unirea Răcari	26	13	2	11	46	41	+5	28	
7	Textila Pucioasa	26	11	5	10	40	36	+4	27	
8	Victoria Titu	26	11	3	12	35	48	−13	25	
9	Turbina Doicești	26	9	5	12	48	55	−7	23	
10	Recolta Săcueni	26	10	3	13	38	52	−14	23	
11	Ciocanul Târgoviște	26	7	6	13	36	53	−17	20	
12	Constructorul Târgoviște	26	8	2	16	46	62	−16	18	
13	Flacăra Valea Mare	26	5	1	20	34	89	−55	11	
14	Recolta Sălcioara	26	3	4	19	32	74	−42	10	

Rules for classification: 1) Points; 2) Goal difference; 3) Number of goals scored.
(C) Champions; (Q) Qualified for the phase indicated

=== Galați County ===
Pos	Team	Pld	W	D	L	GF	GA	GD	Pts	Qualification or relegation
1	Metalosport Galați (C, Q)	24	17	4	3	55	22	+33	38	Qualification to promotion play-off
2	Flamura Roșie Tecuci	24	17	2	5	68	29	+39	36	
3	Tractorul Galați	24	14	7	3	51	22	+29	35	
4	Mecanizatorul Târgu Bujor	24	11	5	8	42	26	+16	27	
5	Tehnometal Galați	24	11	5	8	33	28	+5	27	
6	Trefilorul Galați	24	11	3	10	50	39	+11	25	
7	Victoria IGL Galați	24	11	3	10	33	29	+4	25	
8	Electrica Galați	24	11	2	11	36	38	−2	24	
9	Foresta Șendreni	24	8	4	12	39	52	−13	20	
10	Victoria TC Galați	24	6	5	13	34	48	−14	17	
11	Constructorul SPI Galați	24	7	3	14	28	50	−22	17	
12	Victoria Independența	24	5	5	14	32	48	−16	15	
13	Mobila Galați (R)	24	0	2	22	4	80	−76	2	Relegation to Galați County Championship II

Rules for classification: 1) Points; 2) Goal difference; 3) Number of goals scored.
(C) Champions; (Q) Qualified for the phase indicated; (R) Relegated

=== Harghita County ===
Pos	Team	Pld	W	D	L	GF	GA	GD	Pts	Qualification or relegation
1	Mureșul Toplița (C, Q)	30	22	5	3	94	23	+71	49	Qualification to promotion play-off
2	Harghita Odorheiu Secuiesc	30	21	3	6	88	25	+63	45	
3	Rapid Ciceu	30	13	8	9	51	48	+3	34	
4	Constructorul Miercurea Ciuc	30	15	3	12	43	36	+7	33	
5	Unirea Cristuru Secuiesc II	30	13	7	10	45	44	+1	33	
6	Apemin Borsec	30	14	3	13	70	63	+7	31	
7	Viitorul Gheorgheni II	30	13	3	14	43	50	−7	29	
8	Minerul Chileni	30	13	2	15	63	55	+8	28	
9	Bastionul Lăzarea	30	11	6	13	56	64	−8	28	
10	Sănătatea Tulgheș	30	10	7	13	43	67	−24	27	
11	Flamura Roșie Sânsimion	30	10	6	14	51	60	−9	26	
12	Minerul Lueta	30	9	8	13	43	75	−32	26	
13	Minerul Bălan II	30	10	5	15	41	49	−8	25	
14	Complexul Gălăuțaș	30	11	3	16	71	83	−12	25	
15	Bradul Hodoșa	30	7	7	16	26	68	−42	21	
16	Textila Odorheiu Secuiesc II	30	8	4	18	55	71	−16	20	

Rules for classification: 1) Points; 2) Goal difference; 3) Number of goals scored.
(C) Champions; (Q) Qualified for the phase indicated

=== Hunedoara County ===
Valea Jiului Series

Pos	Team	Pld	W	D	L	GF	GA	GD	Pts	Qualification or relegation
1	Parângul Lonea (Q)	22	16	2	4	75	23	+52	34	Qualification to championship final
2	Minerul Vulcan	22	13	5	4	60	29	+31	31	
3	Preparatorul Petrila	22	13	4	5	61	31	+30	30	
4	Minerul Uricani	22	12	3	7	50	26	+24	27	
5	Gloria Hațeg	22	11	1	10	45	46	−1	23	
6	Energia Paroșeni	22	10	2	10	51	49	+2	22	
7	Utilajul Petroșani	22	9	2	11	34	48	−14	20	
8	Preparatorul Lupeni	22	9	2	11	32	56	−24	20	
9	Minerul Aninoasa	22	8	3	11	48	40	+8	19	
10	Streiul Baru	22	7	2	13	37	55	−18	16	
11	Minerul Lupeni II	22	5	2	15	30	78	−48	12	
12	Constructorul Lupeni (R)	22	5	0	17	28	65	−37	10	Relegation to Hunedoara County Championship II

Rules for classification: 1) Points; 2) Goal difference; 3) Number of goals scored.
(Q) Qualified for the phase indicated; (R) Relegated

Valea Mureșului Series

Pos	Team	Pld	W	D	L	GF	GA	GD	Pts	Qualification or relegation
1	Dacia Orăștie (Q)	26	23	1	2	93	13	+80	47	Qualification to championship final
2	IGCL Hunedoara	26	17	3	6	71	21	+50	37	
3	Aurul Certej	26	15	3	8	86	40	+46	33	
4	Prefabricate Cristur	26	15	1	10	57	37	+20	31	
5	Energia Deva	26	14	3	9	51	39	+12	31	
6	Voința Ilia	26	12	5	9	54	46	+8	29	
7	CFR Simeria II	26	14	1	11	71	65	+6	29	
8	Victoria Dobra	26	12	4	10	43	37	+6	28	
9	Dacia Deva	26	11	1	14	46	76	−30	23	
10	Victoria Călan II	26	10	3	13	57	45	+12	23	
11	Preparatorul Teliuc (R)	26	9	1	16	40	54	−14	19	Relegation to Hunedoara County Championship II
12	Constructorul Hunedoara II	26	8	1	17	43	73	−30	17	
13	Minerul Ghelar II	26	5	1	20	26	98	−72	11	
14	Minerul Teliuc II	26	3	0	23	21	105	−84	6	

Rules for classification: 1) Points; 2) Goal difference; 3) Number of goals scored.
(Q) Qualified for the phase indicated; (R) Relegated

Championship final

Team 1	Agg.	Team 2	1st leg	2nd leg
Parângul Lonea	2–2 (3–4 p)	Dacia Orăștie	0–1	2–1

Dacia Orăștie won the Hunedoara County Championship and qualify to promotion play-off in Divizia C.

=== Ialomița County ===
Series I

Pos	Team	Pld	W	D	L	GF	GA	GD	Pts	Promotion or relegation
1	Metalul Ciulnița (Q)	22	15	4	3	55	13	+42	34	Qualification to championship final
2	Căzănești	22	15	3	4	59	18	+41	33	
3	Uleiul Slobozia	22	16	1	5	61	22	+39	33	
4	Victoria Dragoș Vodă	22	12	2	8	56	30	+26	26	
5	Victoria Țăndărei	22	10	3	9	45	41	+4	23	
6	Spartacus Iazu	22	9	5	8	31	43	−12	23	
7	Steaua Lehliu	22	10	1	11	48	54	−6	21	
8	Unirea Sărățeni	22	8	1	13	36	43	−7	17	
9	Victoria Munteni-Buzău	22	6	4	12	36	36	0	16	
10	Avântul Dor Mărunt	22	7	2	13	32	63	−31	16	
11	Victoria Amara	22	6	3	13	31	48	−17	15	
12	Scânteia	22	2	3	17	19	98	−79	7	

Rules for classification: 1) Points; 2) Goal difference; 3) Number of goals scored.
(Q) Qualified for the phase indicated

Series II

Pos	Team	Pld	W	D	L	GF	GA	GD	Pts	Promotion or relegation
1	Viticola Fetești (Q)	22	16	4	2	48	18	+30	36	Qualification to championship final
2	Locomotiva Fetești	22	15	3	4	58	18	+40	33	
3	Constructorul Călărași	22	15	2	5	55	25	+30	32	
4	Dunărea Grădiștea	22	11	4	7	45	34	+11	26	
5	Spicul Jegălia	22	7	6	9	37	38	−1	20	
6	Zarea Cuza Vodă	22	8	4	10	35	44	−9	20	
7	Mostiștea Ulmu	22	8	3	11	34	39	−5	19	
8	Spicul Dichiseni	21	7	4	10	36	46	−10	18	
9	Victoria Potcoava	22	6	4	12	27	48	−21	16	
10	Victoria Bordușani	21	5	5	11	25	38	−13	15	
11	Recolta Ștefan cel Mare	22	6	2	14	19	47	−28	14	
12	Progresul Fetești	22	5	3	14	32	50	−18	13	

Rules for classification: 1) Points; 2) Goal difference; 3) Number of goals scored.
(Q) Qualified for the phase indicated

Championship final

The matches were played on 4 and 11 June 1972.

Team 1	Agg.	Team 2	1st leg	2nd leg
Metalul Ciulnița	1–5	Viticola Fetești	1–2	0–3

Viticola Fetești won the Ialomița County Championship and qualify to promotion play-off in Divizia C.

=== Neamț County ===
Pos	Team	Pld	W	D	L	GF	GA	GD	Pts	Qualification or relegation
1	Relonul Săvinești (C, Q)	22	18	1	3	84	11	+73	37	Qualification to promotion play-off
2	Celuloza Piatra Neamț	22	15	2	5	57	23	+34	32	
3	Unirea Roman	22	14	3	5	55	27	+28	31	
4	Laminorul Roman	22	13	3	6	56	29	+27	29	
5	Bradul Roznov	22	11	5	6	40	28	+12	27	
6	Hârtia Piatra Neamț	22	12	1	9	51	45	+6	25	
7	Volanul Bicaz	22	6	5	11	28	35	−7	17	
8	Industria Locală Piatra Neamț	22	7	3	12	26	35	−9	17	
9	Cetatea Târgu Neamț	22	6	4	12	37	54	−17	16	
10	Victoria Tarcău	22	7	2	13	26	56	−30	16	
11	Metalul Piatra Neamț	22	3	6	13	27	58	−31	12	
12	Constructorul Piatra Neamț	22	2	1	19	9	95	−86	5	

Rules for classification: 1) Points; 2) Goal difference; 3) Number of goals scored.
(C) Champions; (Q) Qualified for the phase indicated

=== Prahova County ===
Pos	Team	Pld	W	D	L	GF	GA	GD	Pts	Qualification or relegation
1	Chimia Brazi (C, Q)	30	20	5	5	41	16	+25	45	Qualification to promotion play-off
2	Petrolul Băicoi	30	19	4	7	50	17	+33	42	
3	Flacăra Câmpina	30	12	11	7	28	29	−1	35	
4	Vagonul Ploiești	30	11	10	9	54	37	+17	32	
5	Feroemail Ploiești	30	10	10	10	35	39	−4	30	
6	Electrica Câmpina	30	9	11	10	34	34	0	29	
7	Avântul Măneciu	30	11	7	12	39	42	−3	29	
8	Rapid Mizil	30	10	9	11	31	34	−3	29	
9	Chimistul Valea Călugărească	30	11	7	12	30	34	−4	29	
10	Rafinăria Teleajen	30	10	8	12	51	50	+1	28	
11	Petrolul Urlați	30	9	10	11	45	47	−2	28	
12	Metalul Câmpina	30	9	10	11	34	41	−7	28	
13	Minerul Vălenii de Munte	30	10	8	12	38	47	−9	28	
14	UZUC Ploiești	30	9	9	12	26	29	−3	27	
15	Flacăra Ploiești (R)	30	7	8	15	38	58	−20	22	Relegation to Prahova County Championship II
16	Geamuri Boldești-Scăieni (R)	30	5	9	16	21	41	−20	19	Relegation to Prahova County Championship II

Rules for classification: 1) Points; 2) Goal difference; 3) Number of goals scored.
(C) Champions; (Q) Qualified for the phase indicated; (R) Relegated

=== Satu Mare County ===
Pos	Team	Pld	W	D	L	GF	GA	GD	Pts	Qualification or relegation
1	Forestiera Bixad (C, Q)	26	17	6	3	74	26	+48	40	Qualification to promotion play-off
2	Spartac Satu Mare	26	17	3	6	56	24	+32	37	
3	Energia Negrești-Oaș	26	15	5	6	46	26	+20	35	
4	Sticla Poiana Codrului	26	14	6	6	66	33	+33	34	
5	Unirea Tășnad	26	15	4	7	44	21	+23	34	
6	Rapid Satu Mare	26	11	4	11	48	43	+5	26	
7	Recolta Căpleni	26	9	6	11	38	59	−21	24	
8	Recolta Urziceni	26	8	7	11	50	54	−4	23	
9	Recolta Dorolț	26	8	6	12	33	51	−18	22	
10	Automobilul Satu Mare	26	7	7	12	32	54	−22	21	
11	Talna Orașu Nou	26	6	6	14	28	59	−31	18	
12	Spicul Ardud	26	6	5	15	45	58	−13	17	
13	Stăruința Berveni	26	6	5	15	35	53	−18	17	
14	Victoria Livada	26	6	4	16	39	79	−40	16	

Rules for classification: 1) Points; 2) Goal difference; 3) Number of goals scored.
(C) Champions; (Q) Qualified for the phase indicated

=== Sălaj County ===
Pos	Team	Pld	W	D	L	GF	GA	GD	Pts	Qualification or relegation
1	Rapid CFR Jibou (C, Q)	26	19	6	1	78	8	+70	44	Qualification to promotion play-off
2	Silvania Cehu Silvaniei	26	17	6	3	63	19	+44	40	
3	Recolta Hida	26	17	3	6	63	17	+46	37	
4	Minerul Sărmășag	26	16	5	5	57	21	+36	37	
5	Victoria Zalău	26	15	7	4	62	28	+34	37	
6	Gloria Șimleu Silvaniei	26	16	3	7	73	37	+36	35	
7	Panificația Jibou	26	11	9	6	42	32	+10	31	
8	Spartac Crasna	26	8	3	15	35	56	−21	19	
9	Minerul Ip	26	7	4	15	34	58	−24	18	
10	Dumbrava Gâlgău Almașului	26	8	1	17	41	70	−29	17	
11	Recolta Zăuan	26	8	1	17	31	62	−31	17	
12	Energia Zalău	26	6	3	17	26	69	−43	15	
13	Tractorul Nușfalău	26	4	1	21	12	74	−62	9	
14	Comerțul Zalău	26	2	4	20	19	85	−66	8	

Rules for classification: 1) Points; 2) Goal difference; 3) Number of goals scored.
(C) Champions; (Q) Qualified for the phase indicated

=== Sibiu County ===
Pos	Team	Pld	W	D	L	GF	GA	GD	Pts	Qualification or relegation
1	Textila Cisnădie (C, Q)	30	20	8	2	81	27	+54	48	Qualification to promotion play-off
2	Carpați Mârșa	30	18	8	4	54	25	+29	44	
3	Construcții Sibiu	30	18	3	9	68	32	+36	39	
4	Metalul IO Sibiu	30	16	6	8	49	38	+11	38	
5	CFR Sibiu	30	15	7	8	60	35	+25	37	
6	Carbosin Copșa Mică	30	14	9	7	54	37	+17	37	
7	Flamura Roșie Agnita	30	17	2	11	59	49	+10	36	
8	Stăruința Mediaș	30	15	2	13	48	43	+5	32	
9	Metalurgica Sibiu	30	13	3	14	42	38	+4	29	
10	Voința Sibiu	30	9	7	14	52	56	−4	25	
11	Textila Mediaș	30	8	7	15	35	47	−12	23	
12	Sparta Mediaș	30	10	3	17	33	60	−27	23	
13	Unirea Tălmaciu	30	7	7	16	29	59	−30	21	
14	Avântul Dârlos	30	8	4	18	36	69	−33	20	
15	Record Mediaș	30	6	3	21	31	67	−36	15	
16	Electrica Sibiu	30	4	5	21	27	76	−49	13	

Rules for classification: 1) Points; 2) Goal difference; 3) Number of goals scored.
(C) Champions; (Q) Qualified for the phase indicated

=== Suceava County ===
Pos	Team	Pld	W	D	L	GF	GA	GD	Pts	Qualification or relegation
1	Străduința Suceava (C, Q)	26	19	3	4	81	18	+63	41	Qualification to promotion play-off
2	Avântul Rădăuți	26	18	4	4	55	24	+31	40	
3	Foresta Moldovița	26	19	1	6	99	23	+76	39	
4	Autorapid Suceava	26	16	4	6	75	24	+51	36	
5	Chimia Bradul Vama	26	16	2	8	74	42	+32	34	
6	Bistrița Broșteni	26	16	0	10	53	47	+6	32	
7	Automobilul Rădăuți	26	12	5	9	57	43	+14	29	
8	Ocrotirea Siret	26	12	3	11	51	64	−13	27	
9	Siretul Dolhasca	26	11	3	12	69	45	+24	25	
10	Viitorul Liteni	26	10	4	12	47	59	−12	24	
11	Locomotiva Dornești	26	6	3	17	29	84	−55	15	
12	Voința Suceava	26	4	1	21	24	72	−48	9	
13	Forestierul Sucevița	26	4	0	22	23	97	−74	8	
14	ASM Suceava	26	2	1	23	18	101	−83	5	

Rules for classification: 1) Points; 2) Goal difference; 3) Number of goals scored.
(C) Champions; (Q) Qualified for the phase indicated

=== Teleorman County ===
Championship final

Team 1	Agg.	Team 2	1st leg	2nd leg
Teleormanul Troianu	4–1	Recolta Izvoarele	2–0	2–1 (Note: The match was played on neutral ground at Turnu Măgurele.)

Teleormanul Troianu won the Teleorman County Championship and qualify to promotion play-off in Divizia C.

=== Timiș County ===
Pos	Team	Pld	W	D	L	GF	GA	GD	Pts	Qualification or relegation
1	Unirea Tomnatic (C, Q)	30	23	5	2	88	24	+64	51	Qualification to promotion play-off
2	Laminorul Nădrag	30	19	7	4	92	34	+58	45	
3	Unirea Jimbolia	30	18	7	5	49	21	+28	43	
4	Unirea Sânnicolau Mare	30	19	4	7	67	22	+45	42	
5	Ceramica Jimbolia	30	14	6	10	47	37	+10	34	
6	Șoimii Timișoara	30	12	9	9	49	43	+6	33	
7	Politehnica Timișoara II	30	12	7	11	39	36	+3	31	
8	Textila Timișoara	30	11	8	11	44	55	−11	30	
9	FZ Banatul Timișoara	30	13	3	14	46	62	−16	29	
10	Auto Timișoara	30	13	2	15	44	38	+6	28	
11	Comerțul Timișoara	30	9	4	17	37	62	−25	22	
12	Tehnolemn Timișoara	30	7	7	16	37	54	−17	21	
13	Recolta Nerău	30	6	9	15	26	52	−26	21	
14	Progresul Ciacova	30	7	5	18	23	72	−49	19	
15	Recaș (Note: Recaș was spared from relegation due to the promotion of Unirea Tomnatic in Divizia C.)	30	6	6	18	27	64	−37	18	Spared from relegation
16	Șoimii Buziaș (R)	30	5	3	22	29	68	−39	13	Relegation to Timiș County Championship II

Rules for classification: 1) Points; 2) Goal difference; 3) Number of goals scored.
(C) Champions; (Q) Qualified for the phase indicated; (R) Relegated

=== Vrancea County ===
Pos	Team	Pld	W	D	L	GF	GA	GD	Pts	Qualification or relegation
1	Locomotiva Adjud (C, Q)	25	22	3	0	107	19	+88	47	Qualification to promotion play-off
2	Chimica Mărășești	26	17	3	6	88	38	+50	37	
3	Victoria Focșani	26	16	4	6	58	28	+30	36	
4	Foresta Gugești	26	16	3	7	75	36	+39	35	
5	Vrancea Focșani	25	14	3	8	63	37	+26	31	
6	Flacăra Odobești	26	14	3	9	58	47	+11	31	
7	Flacăra Urechești	26	14	2	10	65	59	+6	30	
8	Foresta Cosmești	26	10	4	12	50	63	−13	24	
9	Rapid Panciu (Note: Rapid Panciu and Constructorul Focșani were excluded from the championship and lost all remaining matches 0–3.)	26	8	3	15	46	73	−27	19	
10	Victoria Odobești	26	7	2	17	36	67	−31	16	
11	Constructorul Focșani	26	6	3	17	33	57	−24	15	
12	Avântul Jariștea	26	5	4	17	25	70	−45	14	
13	Putna Bolotești	26	6	2	18	32	90	−58	14	
14	Trotușul Ruginești	26	6	1	19	32	84	−52	13	

Rules for classification: 1) Points; 2) Goal difference; 3) Number of goals scored.
(C) Champions; (Q) Qualified for the phase indicated

== See also ==
- 1971–72 Divizia A
- 1971–72 Divizia B
- 1971–72 Divizia C
- 1971–72 Cupa României
