= 1971–72 Divizia B =

Divizia B
- Season: 1971–72
- Promoted: Sportul Studențesc; CSM Reșița
- Relegated: Poiana Câmpina; Gaz Metan Mediaș; Portul Constanța; Vulturii Textila Lugoj

The 1971–72 Divizia B was the 32nd season of the second tier of the Romanian football league system.

The format has been maintained to two series, each of them having 16 teams. At the end of the season the winners of the series promoted to Divizia A and the last two places from each series relegated to Divizia C.

== Team changes ==
=== To Divizia B ===
Promoted from Divizia C

- Chimia Râmnicu Vâlcea
- Vulturii Textila Lugoj
- Metalul Plopeni
- Chimia Făgăraș

Relegated from Divizia A

- Progresul București
- CFR Timișoara

=== From Divizia B ===
Relegated to Divizia C

- Metrom Brașov
- UM Timișoara
- Flacăra Moreni
- Vagonul Arad

Promoted to Divizia A

- ASA Târgu Mureș
- Crișul Oradea

== League tables ==
=== Serie I ===
Pos	Team	Pld	W	D	L	GF	GA	GD	Pts	Promotion or relegation
1	Sportul Studențesc (C, P)	30	19	9	2	51	27	+24	47	Promotion to Divizia A
2	Progresul București	30	15	7	8	55	30	+25	37	
3	SN Oltenița	30	14	5	11	33	35	−2	33	
4	Politehnica Galați	30	11	9	10	39	29	+10	31	
5	Metalul București	30	12	7	11	36	27	+9	31	
6	Progresul Brăila	30	13	4	13	36	26	+10	30	
7	FC Galați	30	12	6	12	36	34	+2	30	
8	Metalul Plopeni	30	12	5	13	34	33	+1	29	
9	CFR Pașcani	30	12	5	13	34	33	+1	29	
10	Ceahlăul Piatra Neamț	30	12	4	14	34	42	−8	28	
11	Dunărea Giurgiu	30	9	10	11	23	31	−8	28	
12	Metalul Târgoviște	30	11	6	13	29	39	−10	28	
13	Chimia Râmnicu Vâlcea	30	12	4	14	25	37	−12	28	
14	Știința Bacău	30	9	9	12	24	33	−9	27	
15	Poiana Câmpina (R)	30	10	5	15	34	46	−12	25	Relegation to Divizia C
16	Portul Constanța (R)	30	6	7	17	29	50	−21	19	Relegation to Divizia C

Source: romaniansoccer.ro
Rules for classification: 1) Points; 2) Goal difference; 3) Goals scored; 4) Head-to-head points; 5) Head-to-head goal difference; 6) Head-to-head goals scored; 7) Head-to-head away goals scored.
(C) Champions; (P) Promoted; (R) Relegated

=== Serie II ===
Pos	Team	Pld	W	D	L	GF	GA	GD	Pts	Promotion or relegation
1	CSM Reșița (C, P)	30	19	5	6	47	23	+24	43	Promotion to Divizia A
2	Minerul Baia Mare	30	13	6	11	46	40	+6	32	
3	Politehnica Timișoara	30	12	7	11	47	33	+14	31	
4	CFR Arad	30	13	5	12	41	43	−2	31	
5	Minerul Anina	30	13	5	12	39	42	−3	31	
6	CSM Sibiu	30	12	6	12	31	34	−3	30	
7	Metalurgistul Cugir	30	12	5	13	30	31	−1	29	
8	Gloria Bistrița	30	13	3	14	31	34	−3	29	
9	Olimpia Satu Mare	30	13	3	14	25	32	−7	29	
10	Olimpia Oradea	30	13	2	15	41	35	+6	28	
11	CFR Timișoara	30	10	8	12	33	29	+4	28	
12	Chimia Făgăraș	30	13	2	15	44	43	+1	28	
13	Corvinul Hunedoara	30	12	4	14	35	37	−2	28	
14	Electroputere Craiova	30	12	4	14	36	39	−3	28	
15	Gaz Metan Mediaș (R)	30	12	4	14	20	29	−9	28	Relegation to Divizia C
16	Vulturii Textila Lugoj (R)	30	11	5	14	28	50	−22	27	Relegation to Divizia C

Source: romaniansoccer.ro
Rules for classification: 1) Points; 2) Goal difference; 3) Goals scored; 4) Head-to-head points; 5) Head-to-head goal difference; 6) Head-to-head goals scored; 7) Head-to-head away goals scored.
(C) Champions; (P) Promoted; (R) Relegated

== See also ==
- 1971–72 Divizia A
- 1971–72 Divizia C
- 1971–72 County Championship
- 1971–72 Cupa României
