= 1971–72 Divizia C =

Third tier Romanian football league

Divizia C
- Season: 1971–72
- Champions: ITA Pașcani Petrolul Moinești Delta Tulcea Electronica Obor București Gloria Buzău Flacăra Moreni Metalul Drobeta-Turnu Severin Vagonul Arad Independența Sibiu Victoria Carei IS Câmpia Turzii Metrom Brașov
- Promoted: Delta Tulcea Gloria Buzău Metalul Drobeta-Turnu Severin Metrom Brașov

The 1971–72 Divizia C was the 16th season of Liga III, the third tier of the Romanian football league system.

The format was changed to twelve series of 14 teams each. At the end of the season, the winners of each series qualified for the Divizia B promotion play-off, from which four teams were promoted to Divizia B, while the bottom two teams from each series were relegated to the County Championship.

== Team changes ==
=== To Divizia C ===
Relegated from Divizia B

- Metrom Brașov
- Flacăra Moreni
- UM Timișoara
- Vagonul Arad

Promoted from County Championship

- Avântul Frasin
- Victoria PTTR Botoșani
- Constructorul Iași
- Danubiana Roman
- Viitorul Vaslui
- Oituz Târgu Ocna
- Luceafărul Focșani
- Gloria Tecuci
- Granitul Babadag
- Șantierul Naval Constanța
- Dunărea Brăila
- Dinamo Obor București
- Victoria Lehliu
- Metalul Oțelu Roșu
- Minerul Rovinari
- Progresul Strehaia
- Sporting Roșiori
- Muscelul Câmpulung
- Rapid Piatra Olt
- Unirea Bujoreni
- Chimia Buzău
- Aurora Urziceni
- Viitorul Slănic
- Gloria Mija
- Gloria Arad
- Progresul Timișoara
- UPA Sibiu
- Textila Sebeș
- Constructorul Hunedoara
- Voința Carei
- Minerul Cavnic
- Măgura Șimleu Silvaniei
- Bihoreana Marghita
- Minerul Rodna
- Tehnofrig Cluj
- Viitorul Târgu Mureș
- Politehnica Brașov
- Carpați Covasna
- Miercurea Ciuc

=== From Divizia C ===
Promoted to Divizia B

- Chimia Râmnicu Vâlcea
- Vulturii Textila Lugoj
- Metalul Plopeni
- Chimia Făgăraș

Relegated to County Championship

- —

=== Other changes ===
- Penicilina Iași was renamed Unirea Iași.
- Rarăul Câmpulung Moldovenesc was renamed ASA Câmpulung Moldovenesc.
- Muncitorul Tecuci was renamed URA Tecuci.
- Unirea București was renamed Unirea Tricolor București.
- FC Caracal was renamed Răsăritul Caracal.
- Gloria Slatina was renamed Oltul Slatina.
- Lemnarul Odorheiu Secuiesc was renamed Textila Odorheiu Secuiesc.
- Gloria Mija was renamed Metalul Mija.
- Chimistul Baia Mare was renamed Topitorul Baia Mare.
- Metalul Buzău ceded its place to the newly formed Gloria Buzău.
- Unirea Bujoreni was replaced by Oltul Râmnicu Vâlcea.

== League tables ==
=== Series I ===
| Pos | Team | Pld | W | D | L | GF | GA | GD | Pts | Promotion or relegation |
|---|---|---|---|---|---|---|---|---|---|---|
| 1 | ITA Pașcani (C, Q) | 26 | 18 | 3 | 5 | 65 | 23 | +42 | 39 | Qualification to promotion play-off |
| 2 | Chimia Suceava | 26 | 14 | 8 | 4 | 40 | 10 | +30 | 36 | |
| 3 | ASA Câmpulung Moldovenesc | 26 | 14 | 8 | 4 | 46 | 25 | +21 | 36 | |
| 4 | Victoria Roman | 26 | 15 | 4 | 7 | 50 | 25 | +25 | 34 | |
| 5 | Minerul Gura Humorului | 26 | 12 | 7 | 7 | 52 | 19 | +33 | 31 | |
| 6 | Avântul Frasin | 26 | 12 | 5 | 9 | 30 | 29 | +1 | 29 | |
| 7 | Textila Botoșani | 26 | 7 | 9 | 10 | 32 | 35 | −3 | 23 | |
| 8 | Foresta Fălticeni | 26 | 9 | 5 | 12 | 24 | 30 | −6 | 23 | |
| 9 | Minobrad Vatra Dornei | 26 | 9 | 3 | 14 | 38 | 54 | −16 | 21 | |
| 10 | Unirea Iași | 26 | 8 | 5 | 13 | 31 | 50 | −19 | 21 | |
| 11 | Nicolina Iași | 26 | 8 | 4 | 14 | 38 | 58 | −20 | 20 | |
| 12 | Fulgerul Dorohoi | 26 | 8 | 4 | 14 | 31 | 53 | −22 | 20 | |
| 13 | Victoria PTTR Botoșani (R) | 26 | 8 | 3 | 15 | 34 | 57 | −23 | 19 | Relegation to County Championship |
| 14 | Constructorul Iași (R) | 26 | 1 | 10 | 15 | 18 | 61 | −43 | 12 | Relegation to County Championship |

Source: romaniansoccer.ro
(C) Champions; (Q) Qualified for the phase indicated; (R) Relegated

=== Series II ===
| Pos | Team | Pld | W | D | L | GF | GA | GD | Pts | Promotion or relegation |
|---|---|---|---|---|---|---|---|---|---|---|
| 1 | Petrolul Moinești (C, Q) | 26 | 14 | 10 | 2 | 58 | 23 | +35 | 38 | Qualification to promotion play-off |
| 2 | Rulmentul Bârlad | 26 | 15 | 5 | 6 | 41 | 24 | +17 | 35 | |
| 3 | Minerul Comănești | 26 | 14 | 5 | 7 | 36 | 24 | +12 | 33 | |
| 4 | Automobilul Focșani | 26 | 15 | 1 | 10 | 49 | 41 | +8 | 31 | |
| 5 | Danubiana Roman | 26 | 12 | 3 | 11 | 49 | 37 | +12 | 27 | |
| 6 | Viitorul Vaslui | 26 | 10 | 6 | 10 | 28 | 33 | −5 | 26 | |
| 7 | URA Tecuci | 26 | 11 | 3 | 12 | 38 | 36 | +2 | 25 | |
| 8 | Textila Buhuși | 26 | 11 | 2 | 13 | 47 | 35 | +12 | 24 | |
| 9 | Letea Bacău | 26 | 11 | 2 | 13 | 40 | 37 | +3 | 24 | |
| 10 | Oituz Târgu Ocna | 26 | 9 | 5 | 12 | 33 | 43 | −10 | 23 | |
| 11 | Trotușul Gheorghe Gheorghiu-Dej | 26 | 9 | 4 | 13 | 38 | 48 | −10 | 22 | |
| 12 | Cimentul Bicaz | 26 | 8 | 6 | 12 | 32 | 52 | −20 | 22 | |
| 13 | Luceafărul Focșani (R) | 26 | 7 | 5 | 14 | 37 | 49 | −12 | 19 | Relegation to County Championship |
| 14 | Gloria Tecuci (R) | 26 | 3 | 9 | 14 | 20 | 64 | −44 | 15 | Relegation to County Championship |

Source: romaniansoccer.ro
(C) Champions; (Q) Qualified for the phase indicated; (R) Relegated

=== Series III ===
| Pos | Team | Pld | W | D | L | GF | GA | GD | Pts | Promotion or relegation |
|---|---|---|---|---|---|---|---|---|---|---|
| 1 | Delta Tulcea (C, Q) | 26 | 15 | 7 | 4 | 38 | 11 | +27 | 37 | Qualification to promotion play-off |
| 2 | IMU Medgidia | 26 | 12 | 11 | 3 | 48 | 23 | +25 | 35 | |
| 3 | SUT Galați | 26 | 13 | 8 | 5 | 51 | 16 | +35 | 34 | |
| 4 | Dacia Galați | 26 | 11 | 6 | 9 | 37 | 30 | +7 | 28 | |
| 5 | Metalurgistul Brăila | 26 | 11 | 6 | 9 | 36 | 32 | +4 | 28 | |
| 6 | Electrica Constanța | 26 | 10 | 6 | 10 | 37 | 43 | −6 | 26 | |
| 7 | Marina Mangalia | 26 | 7 | 11 | 8 | 27 | 26 | +1 | 25 | |
| 8 | Unirea Tricolor Brăila | 26 | 7 | 10 | 9 | 24 | 39 | −15 | 24 | |
| 9 | Ancora Galați | 26 | 7 | 9 | 10 | 23 | 33 | −10 | 23 | |
| 10 | Cimentul Medgidia | 26 | 7 | 8 | 11 | 30 | 29 | +1 | 22 | |
| 11 | Dunărea Tulcea | 26 | 6 | 10 | 10 | 20 | 36 | −16 | 22 | |
| 12 | Granitul Babadag | 26 | 9 | 4 | 13 | 33 | 53 | −20 | 22 | |
| 13 | Șantierul Naval Constanța (R) | 26 | 7 | 6 | 13 | 23 | 38 | −15 | 20 | Relegation to County Championship |
| 14 | Dunărea Brăila (R) | 26 | 7 | 4 | 15 | 32 | 50 | −18 | 18 | Relegation to County Championship |

Source: romaniansoccer.ro
(C) Champions; (Q) Qualified for the phase indicated; (R) Relegated

=== Series IV ===
| Pos | Team | Pld | W | D | L | GF | GA | GD | Pts | Promotion or relegation |
|---|---|---|---|---|---|---|---|---|---|---|
| 1 | Electronica Obor București (C, Q) | 26 | 15 | 7 | 4 | 41 | 17 | +24 | 37 | Qualification to promotion play-off |
| 2 | Unirea Tricolor București | 26 | 13 | 9 | 4 | 46 | 18 | +28 | 35 | |
| 3 | Autobuzul București | 26 | 13 | 7 | 6 | 42 | 21 | +21 | 33 | |
| 4 | Tehnometal București | 26 | 14 | 4 | 8 | 45 | 27 | +18 | 32 | |
| 5 | Celuloza Călărași | 26 | 14 | 4 | 8 | 40 | 23 | +17 | 32 | |
| 6 | TMB București | 26 | 12 | 5 | 9 | 32 | 27 | +5 | 29 | |
| 7 | Laromet București | 26 | 8 | 10 | 8 | 21 | 27 | −6 | 26 | |
| 8 | Flacăra Roșie București | 26 | 9 | 5 | 12 | 28 | 38 | −10 | 23 | |
| 9 | Sirena București | 26 | 6 | 10 | 10 | 23 | 27 | −4 | 22 | |
| 10 | Voința București | 26 | 7 | 8 | 11 | 22 | 33 | −11 | 22 | |
| 11 | Dinamo Obor București | 26 | 7 | 8 | 11 | 19 | 30 | −11 | 22 | |
| 12 | Olimpia Giurgiu | 26 | 7 | 7 | 12 | 24 | 34 | −10 | 21 | |
| 13 | Mașini Unelte București (R) | 26 | 6 | 8 | 12 | 22 | 37 | −15 | 20 | Relegation to County Championship |
| 14 | Victoria Lehliu (R) | 26 | 3 | 4 | 19 | 13 | 59 | −46 | 10 | Relegation to County Championship |

Source: romaniansoccer.ro
(C) Champions; (Q) Qualified for the phase indicated; (R) Relegated

=== Series V ===
| Pos | Team | Pld | W | D | L | GF | GA | GD | Pts | Promotion or relegation |
|---|---|---|---|---|---|---|---|---|---|---|
| 1 | Gloria Buzău (C, Q) | 26 | 15 | 10 | 1 | 41 | 14 | +27 | 40 | Qualification to promotion play-off |
| 2 | Carpați Sinaia | 26 | 14 | 5 | 7 | 51 | 32 | +19 | 33 | |
| 3 | Șoimii Buzău | 26 | 11 | 8 | 7 | 35 | 23 | +12 | 30 | |
| 4 | IRA Câmpina | 26 | 12 | 5 | 9 | 35 | 24 | +11 | 29 | |
| 5 | Petrolistul Boldești | 26 | 10 | 7 | 9 | 38 | 32 | +6 | 27 | |
| 6 | Prahova Ploiești | 26 | 8 | 11 | 7 | 36 | 32 | +4 | 27 | |
| 7 | Caraimanul Bușteni | 26 | 9 | 8 | 9 | 34 | 30 | +4 | 26 | |
| 8 | Azotul Slobozia | 26 | 8 | 9 | 9 | 37 | 36 | +1 | 25 | |
| 9 | Victoria Florești | 26 | 8 | 7 | 11 | 44 | 44 | 0 | 23 | |
| 10 | Petrolul Berca | 26 | 8 | 7 | 11 | 31 | 36 | −5 | 23 | |
| 11 | Chimia Buzău | 26 | 9 | 5 | 12 | 31 | 42 | −11 | 23 | |
| 12 | Olimpia Râmnicu Sărat | 26 | 8 | 6 | 12 | 28 | 36 | −8 | 22 | |
| 13 | Aurora Urziceni (R) | 26 | 8 | 4 | 14 | 29 | 58 | −29 | 20 | Relegation to County Championship |
| 14 | Viitorul Slănic (R) | 26 | 7 | 2 | 17 | 26 | 57 | −31 | 16 | Relegation to County Championship |

Source: romaniansoccer.ro
(C) Champions; (Q) Qualified for the phase indicated; (R) Relegated

=== Series VI ===
| Pos | Team | Pld | W | D | L | GF | GA | GD | Pts | Promotion or relegation |
|---|---|---|---|---|---|---|---|---|---|---|
| 1 | Flacăra Moreni (C, Q) | 26 | 19 | 3 | 4 | 60 | 19 | +41 | 41 | Qualification to promotion play-off |
| 2 | Oltul Slatina | 26 | 16 | 6 | 4 | 45 | 18 | +27 | 38 | |
| 3 | Chimia Turnu Măgurele | 26 | 12 | 6 | 8 | 35 | 20 | +15 | 30 | |
| 4 | Dacia Pitești | 26 | 10 | 7 | 9 | 39 | 30 | +9 | 27 | |
| 5 | Petrolul Târgoviște | 26 | 11 | 5 | 10 | 37 | 32 | +5 | 27 | |
| 6 | Metalul Mija | 26 | 11 | 4 | 11 | 39 | 35 | +4 | 26 | |
| 7 | Petrolul Videle | 26 | 8 | 9 | 9 | 30 | 25 | +5 | 25 | |
| 8 | Comerțul Alexandria | 26 | 10 | 5 | 11 | 24 | 34 | −10 | 25 | |
| 9 | Unirea Drăgășani | 26 | 9 | 6 | 11 | 38 | 35 | +3 | 24 | |
| 10 | Lotru Brezoi | 26 | 8 | 7 | 11 | 27 | 48 | −21 | 23 | |
| 11 | Oltul Râmnicu Vâlcea | 26 | 9 | 4 | 13 | 36 | 46 | −10 | 22 | |
| 12 | Sporting Roșiori | 26 | 8 | 6 | 12 | 33 | 50 | −17 | 22 | |
| 13 | Muscelul Câmpulung (R) | 26 | 6 | 7 | 13 | 23 | 43 | −20 | 19 | Relegation to County Championship |
| 14 | Rapid Piatra Olt (R) | 26 | 5 | 5 | 16 | 20 | 51 | −31 | 15 | Relegation to County Championship |

Source: romaniansoccer.ro
(C) Champions; (Q) Qualified for the phase indicated; (R) Relegated

=== Series VII ===
| Pos | Team | Pld | W | D | L | GF | GA | GD | Pts | Promotion or relegation |
|---|---|---|---|---|---|---|---|---|---|---|
| 1 | Metalul Drobeta-Turnu Severin (C, Q) | 24 | 15 | 5 | 4 | 54 | 23 | +31 | 35 | Qualification to promotion play-off |
| 2 | Știința Petroșani | 24 | 14 | 6 | 4 | 48 | 20 | +28 | 34 | |
| 3 | Minerul Lupeni | 24 | 11 | 10 | 3 | 49 | 24 | +25 | 32 | |
| 4 | Minerul Motru | 24 | 10 | 7 | 7 | 37 | 26 | +11 | 27 | |
| 5 | Dunărea Calafat | 24 | 9 | 6 | 9 | 48 | 41 | +7 | 24 | |
| 6 | Pandurii Târgu Jiu | 24 | 9 | 5 | 10 | 28 | 35 | −7 | 23 | |
| 7 | Steagul Roșu Plenița | 24 | 9 | 4 | 11 | 35 | 32 | +3 | 22 | |
| 8 | Răsăritul Caracal | 24 | 8 | 6 | 10 | 42 | 43 | −1 | 22 | |
| 9 | MEVA Drobeta-Turnu Severin | 24 | 7 | 6 | 11 | 24 | 36 | −12 | 20 | |
| 10 | Progresul Corabia | 24 | 7 | 6 | 11 | 28 | 42 | −14 | 20 | |
| 11 | Metalul Topleț | 24 | 7 | 6 | 11 | 35 | 52 | −17 | 20 | |
| 12 | Minerul Rovinari | 24 | 6 | 5 | 13 | 26 | 56 | −30 | 17 | |
| 13 | Progresul Strehaia (R) | 24 | 6 | 4 | 14 | 20 | 44 | −24 | 16 | Relegation to County Championship |

Source: romaniansoccer.ro
(C) Champions; (Q) Qualified for the phase indicated; (R) Relegated

=== Series VIII ===
| Pos | Team | Pld | W | D | L | GF | GA | GD | Pts | Promotion or relegation |
|---|---|---|---|---|---|---|---|---|---|---|
| 1 | Vagonul Arad (C, Q) | 26 | 15 | 6 | 5 | 39 | 24 | +15 | 36 | Qualification to promotion play-off |
| 2 | Mureșul Deva | 26 | 14 | 5 | 7 | 59 | 25 | +34 | 33 | |
| 3 | UM Timișoara | 26 | 12 | 6 | 8 | 39 | 29 | +10 | 30 | |
| 4 | Minerul Moldova Nouă | 26 | 11 | 7 | 8 | 35 | 27 | +8 | 29 | |
| 5 | Electromotor Timișoara | 26 | 12 | 4 | 10 | 39 | 33 | +6 | 28 | |
| 6 | Progresul Timișoara | 26 | 10 | 6 | 10 | 39 | 39 | 0 | 26 | |
| 7 | Metalul Oțelu Roșu | 26 | 10 | 6 | 10 | 47 | 48 | −1 | 26 | |
| 8 | Aurul Brad | 26 | 11 | 4 | 11 | 35 | 41 | −6 | 26 | |
| 9 | Furnirul Deta | 26 | 11 | 4 | 11 | 24 | 30 | −6 | 26 | |
| 10 | Minerul Bocșa Montană | 26 | 11 | 3 | 12 | 42 | 49 | −7 | 25 | |
| 11 | Minerul Ghelar | 26 | 11 | 2 | 13 | 41 | 46 | −5 | 24 | |
| 12 | Gloria Arad | 26 | 9 | 5 | 12 | 30 | 32 | −2 | 23 | |
| 13 | CFR Caransebeș (R) | 26 | 6 | 6 | 14 | 34 | 45 | −11 | 18 | Relegation to County Championship |
| 14 | Victoria Caransebeș (R) | 26 | 4 | 6 | 16 | 25 | 60 | −35 | 14 | Relegation to County Championship |

Source: romaniansoccer.ro
(C) Champions; (Q) Qualified for the phase indicated; (R) Relegated

=== Series IX ===
| Pos | Team | Pld | W | D | L | GF | GA | GD | Pts | Promotion or relegation |
|---|---|---|---|---|---|---|---|---|---|---|
| 1 | Independența Sibiu (C, Q) | 26 | 16 | 4 | 6 | 62 | 21 | +41 | 36 | Qualification to promotion play-off |
| 2 | Victoria Călan | 26 | 13 | 4 | 9 | 45 | 26 | +19 | 30 | |
| 3 | Unirea Alba Iulia | 26 | 13 | 4 | 9 | 25 | 26 | −1 | 30 | |
| 4 | Minerul Teliuc | 26 | 11 | 6 | 9 | 36 | 31 | +5 | 28 | |
| 5 | CFR Simeria | 26 | 12 | 3 | 11 | 46 | 35 | +11 | 27 | |
| 6 | Metalul Copșa Mică | 26 | 11 | 5 | 10 | 37 | 40 | −3 | 27 | |
| 7 | CFR Sighișoara | 26 | 9 | 8 | 9 | 28 | 31 | −3 | 26 | |
| 8 | Chimia Victoria | 26 | 11 | 4 | 11 | 28 | 33 | −5 | 26 | |
| 9 | UPA Sibiu | 26 | 10 | 5 | 11 | 36 | 38 | −2 | 25 | |
| 10 | Vitrometan Mediaș | 26 | 9 | 7 | 10 | 31 | 46 | −15 | 25 | |
| 11 | Minaur Zlatna | 26 | 10 | 4 | 12 | 33 | 34 | −1 | 24 | |
| 12 | Textila Sebeș | 26 | 9 | 4 | 13 | 37 | 53 | −16 | 22 | |
| 13 | Constructorul Hunedoara (R) | 26 | 8 | 6 | 12 | 22 | 38 | −16 | 22 | Relegation to County Championship |
| 14 | ASA Sibiu (R) | 26 | 6 | 4 | 16 | 34 | 48 | −14 | 16 | Relegation to County Championship |

Source: romaniansoccer.ro
(C) Champions; (Q) Qualified for the phase indicated; (R) Relegated

=== Series X ===
| Pos | Team | Pld | W | D | L | GF | GA | GD | Pts | Promotion or relegation |
|---|---|---|---|---|---|---|---|---|---|---|
| 1 | Victoria Carei (C, Q) | 26 | 17 | 3 | 6 | 67 | 23 | +44 | 37 | Qualification to promotion play-off |
| 2 | Minerul Baia Sprie | 26 | 12 | 7 | 7 | 41 | 17 | +24 | 31 | |
| 3 | Bihoreana Marghita | 26 | 13 | 5 | 8 | 39 | 30 | +9 | 31 | |
| 4 | Unirea Zalău | 26 | 11 | 8 | 7 | 31 | 22 | +9 | 30 | |
| 5 | Minerul Cavnic | 26 | 10 | 8 | 8 | 39 | 27 | +12 | 28 | |
| 6 | Topitorul Baia Mare | 26 | 11 | 5 | 10 | 31 | 41 | −10 | 27 | |
| 7 | Bradul Vișeu de Sus | 26 | 10 | 6 | 10 | 28 | 41 | −13 | 26 | |
| 8 | Someșul Satu Mare | 26 | 10 | 5 | 11 | 34 | 29 | +5 | 25 | |
| 9 | CIL Sighetu Marmației | 26 | 11 | 3 | 12 | 29 | 32 | −3 | 25 | |
| 10 | Recolta Salonta | 26 | 10 | 4 | 12 | 32 | 46 | −14 | 24 | |
| 11 | Constructorul Baia Mare | 26 | 7 | 8 | 11 | 42 | 52 | −10 | 22 | |
| 12 | Voința Carei | 26 | 9 | 4 | 13 | 28 | 40 | −12 | 22 | |
| 13 | Gloria Baia Mare (R) | 26 | 8 | 6 | 12 | 20 | 37 | −17 | 22 | Relegation to County Championship |
| 14 | Măgura Șimleu Silvaniei (R) | 26 | 6 | 2 | 18 | 21 | 45 | −24 | 14 | Relegation to County Championship |

Source: romaniansoccer.ro
(C) Champions; (Q) Qualified for the phase indicated; (R) Relegated

=== Series XI ===
| Pos | Team | Pld | W | D | L | GF | GA | GD | Pts | Promotion or relegation |
|---|---|---|---|---|---|---|---|---|---|---|
| 1 | IS Câmpia Turzii (C, Q) | 26 | 20 | 1 | 5 | 74 | 19 | +55 | 41 | Qualification to promotion play-off |
| 2 | Chimica Târnăveni | 26 | 18 | 4 | 4 | 67 | 22 | +45 | 40 | |
| 3 | Arieșul Turda | 26 | 14 | 4 | 8 | 48 | 29 | +19 | 32 | |
| 4 | CIL Gherla | 26 | 12 | 6 | 8 | 45 | 28 | +17 | 30 | |
| 5 | Metalul Aiud | 26 | 12 | 5 | 9 | 46 | 30 | +16 | 29 | |
| 6 | Dermata Cluj | 26 | 11 | 5 | 10 | 31 | 26 | +5 | 27 | |
| 7 | Unirea Dej | 26 | 9 | 8 | 9 | 33 | 37 | −4 | 26 | |
| 8 | Soda Ocna Mureș | 26 | 9 | 6 | 11 | 28 | 35 | −7 | 24 | |
| 9 | Tehnofrig Cluj | 26 | 8 | 7 | 11 | 26 | 38 | −12 | 23 | |
| 10 | Viitorul Târgu Mureș | 26 | 9 | 3 | 14 | 46 | 42 | +4 | 21 | |
| 11 | Arieșul Câmpia Turzii | 26 | 8 | 5 | 13 | 25 | 34 | −9 | 21 | |
| 12 | Someșul Beclean | 26 | 7 | 4 | 15 | 31 | 87 | −56 | 18 | |
| 13 | Minerul Rodna (R) | 26 | 5 | 7 | 14 | 31 | 79 | −48 | 17 | Relegation to County Championship |
| 14 | Progresul Năsăud (R) | 26 | 5 | 5 | 16 | 30 | 55 | −25 | 15 | Relegation to County Championship |

Source: romaniansoccer.ro
(C) Champions; (Q) Qualified for the phase indicated; (R) Relegated

=== Series XII ===
| Pos | Team | Pld | W | D | L | GF | GA | GD | Pts | Promotion or relegation |
|---|---|---|---|---|---|---|---|---|---|---|
| 1 | Metrom Brașov (C, Q) | 26 | 21 | 2 | 3 | 74 | 9 | +65 | 44 | Qualification to promotion play-off |
| 2 | Tractorul Brașov | 26 | 17 | 4 | 5 | 69 | 22 | +47 | 38 | |
| 3 | Politehnica Brașov | 26 | 10 | 11 | 5 | 31 | 22 | +9 | 31 | |
| 4 | Textila Odorheiu Secuiesc | 26 | 11 | 7 | 8 | 38 | 31 | +7 | 29 | |
| 5 | Forestierul Târgu Secuiesc | 26 | 11 | 7 | 8 | 29 | 30 | −1 | 29 | |
| 6 | Carpați Brașov | 26 | 11 | 5 | 10 | 38 | 31 | +7 | 27 | |
| 7 | Oltul Sfântu Gheorghe | 26 | 10 | 7 | 9 | 41 | 41 | 0 | 27 | |
| 8 | Torpedo Zărnești | 26 | 9 | 8 | 9 | 30 | 30 | 0 | 26 | |
| 9 | Carpați Covasna | 26 | 10 | 5 | 11 | 23 | 41 | −18 | 25 | |
| 10 | Viitorul Gheorgheni | 26 | 8 | 8 | 10 | 38 | 47 | −9 | 24 | |
| 11 | Minerul Bălan | 26 | 8 | 8 | 10 | 17 | 33 | −16 | 24 | |
| 12 | Unirea Cristuru Secuiesc | 26 | 5 | 6 | 15 | 25 | 49 | −24 | 16 | |
| 13 | Miercurea Ciuc (R) | 26 | 4 | 7 | 15 | 19 | 39 | −20 | 15 | Relegation to County Championship |
| 14 | Colorom Codlea (R) | 26 | 3 | 3 | 20 | 18 | 65 | −47 | 9 | Relegation to County Championship |

Source: romaniansoccer.ro
(C) Champions; (Q) Qualified for the phase indicated; (R) Relegated

== Promotion play-off ==
=== Group I ===
| Pos | Team | Pld | W | D | L | GF | GA | GD | Pts | Promotion |
|---|---|---|---|---|---|---|---|---|---|---|
| 1 | Delta Tulcea (P) | 2 | 2 | 0 | 0 | 13 | 3 | +10 | 4 | Promotion to Divizia B |
| 2 | Petrolul Moinești | 2 | 1 | 0 | 1 | 5 | 4 | +1 | 2 | |
| 3 | ITA Pașcani | 2 | 0 | 0 | 2 | 2 | 13 | −11 | 0 | |

(P) Promoted

| 2 July 1972 | Delta Tulcea | 10–1 | ITA Pașcani | București |
| | Stoichițoiu 6'; Pareșcura 14'; Pareșcura 24'; Florea II 25'; Girip 34'; Pareșcura 54'; Manu 58'; Stoichițoiu 77'; Florea II 82'; Răuț 87' | Report | Gh. Ionescu 43' (pen.) | Stadium: Politehnica; Attendance: 3,000; Referee: Nicolae Petriceanu (București) |

| 5 July 1972 | Delta Tulcea | 3–2 | Petrolul Moinești | București |
| | Pareșcura 56'; Pareșcura 60'; Girip 90' | Report | Mocănaș 79'; Mocănaș 86' | Stadium: Politehnica; Referee: Gheorghe Limona (București) |

| 9 July 1972 | Petrolul Moinești | 3–1 | ITA Pașcani | Roman |
| | Moraru 18'; Mocănaș 37'; Birliga 58' | Report | Crețu 3' | Stadium: Moldova; Attendance: 500; Referee: V.Lupu (Roman) |

=== Group II ===
| Pos | Team | Pld | W | D | L | GF | GA | GD | Pts | Promotion |
|---|---|---|---|---|---|---|---|---|---|---|
| 1 | Gloria Buzău (P) | 2 | 2 | 0 | 0 | 4 | 1 | +3 | 4 | Promotion to Divizia B |
| 2 | Flacăra Moreni | 2 | 1 | 0 | 1 | 2 | 1 | +1 | 2 | |
| 3 | Electronica Obor București | 2 | 0 | 0 | 2 | 1 | 5 | −4 | 0 | |

(P) Promoted

| 2 July 1972 | Flacăra Moreni | 2–0 | Electronica Obor București | Ploiești |
| | Petrescu 44'; Ilie Stelian 55' | Report | | Stadium: Petrolul; Attendance: 5,000; Referee: Ion Cîmpeanu (Cluj) |

| 5 July 1972 | Electronica Obor București | 1–3 | Gloria Buzău | Ploiești |
| | Ionescu 17' | Report | Negoescu 39'; Cramer 51'; Cramer 52' | Stadium: Petrolul; Attendance: 10,000; Referee: Mircea Rotaru (Iași) |

| 9 July 1972 | Gloria Buzău | 1–0 | Flacăra Moreni | Ploiești |
| | Negoescu 57' | Report | | Stadium: Petrolul; Referee: Ioan Rus (Târgu Mureș) |

=== Group III ===
| Pos | Team | Pld | W | D | L | GF | GA | GD | Pts | Promotion |
|---|---|---|---|---|---|---|---|---|---|---|
| 1 | Metalul Turnu Severin (P) | 2 | 1 | 1 | 0 | 3 | 2 | +1 | 3 | Promotion to Divizia B |
| 2 | Independența Sibiu | 2 | 0 | 2 | 0 | 2 | 2 | 0 | 2 | |
| 3 | Vagonul Arad | 2 | 0 | 1 | 1 | 2 | 3 | −1 | 1 | |

(P) Promoted

| 2 July 1972 | Independența Sibiu | 1–1 | Vagonul Arad | Râmnicu Vâlcea |
| | Cherciu 29' | Report | Dobai 40' | Stadium: 1 Mai; Attendance: 3,000; Referee: Aurel Bențu (București) |

| 5 July 1972 | Metalul Turnu Severin | 2–1 | Vagonul Arad | Râmnicu Vâlcea |
| | Boța 47'; Olteanu 44' | Report | Breban 79' | Stadium: 1 Mai; Attendance: 4,500; Referee: Alexandru Pîrvu (București) |

| 9 July 1972 | Metalul Turnu Severin | 1–1 | Independența Sibiu | Râmnicu Vâlcea |
| | Căprioru 66' | Report | Pavlovici 15' | Stadium: 1 Mai; Referee: Gheorghe Limona (București) |

=== Group IV ===
| Pos | Team | Pld | W | D | L | GF | GA | GD | Pts | Promotion |
|---|---|---|---|---|---|---|---|---|---|---|
| 1 | Metrom Brașov (P) | 2 | 2 | 0 | 0 | 6 | 1 | +5 | 4 | Promotion to Divizia B |
| 2 | IS Câmpia Turzii | 2 | 1 | 0 | 1 | 4 | 3 | +1 | 2 | |
| 3 | Victoria Carei | 2 | 0 | 0 | 2 | 1 | 7 | −6 | 0 | |

(P) Promoted

| 2 July 1972 | IS Câmpia Turzii | 3–1 | Victoria Carei | Hunedoara |
| | Popa 47'; Bereș 70' (o.g.); Naghi 80' | Report | Szabo 60' | Stadium: Constructorul; Referee: Kevork Ghemingean (București) |

| 5 July 1972 | Victoria Carei | 0–4 | Metrom Brașov | Hunedoara |
| | | Report | Furnică 59'; Anghel 65'; Anghel 68'; Paraschivescu 73' | Stadium: Constructorul; Referee: Aurel Bențu (București) |

| 9 July 1972 | Metrom Brașov | 2–1 | IS Câmpia Turzii | Hunedoara |
| | Parașchivescu 47'; Anghel 89' | Report | Popa 51' | Stadium: Constructorul; Attendance: 5,000; Referee: Alexandru Pîrvu (București) |

== See also ==
- 1971–72 Divizia A
- 1971–72 Divizia B
- 1971–72 County Championship
- 1971–72 Cupa României
