= Liga IV Ialomița =

Fourth tier Romanian football league

- Founded: 1968
- Country: Romania
- Level on pyramid: 4
- Promotion to: Liga III
- Relegation to: Liga V Ialomița
- Domestic cup: Cupa României – County phase
- Current champions: Bărăganul Ciulnița (4th title) (2025–26)
- Most championships: Fetești (11 titles)
- Website: frf-ajf.ro/ialomita
- Current: 2025–26 Liga IV Ialomița

Liga IV Ialomița is one of the regional football divisions of Liga IV, the fourth tier of the Romanian football league system, for clubs based in Ialomița County, and is organized by AJF Ialomița – Asociația Județeană de Fotbal (lit. 'County Football Association').

It is contested by a variable number of teams, depending on the number of teams relegated from Liga III, the number of teams promoted from Liga V Ialomița, and the teams that withdraw or enter the competition. The winner may or may not be promoted to Liga III, depending on the result of a promotion play-off contested against the winner of a neighboring county series.

== History ==
In 1968, following the new administrative and territorial reorganization of the country, each county established its own football championship, integrating teams from the former regional championships as well as those that had previously competed in town and rayon level competitions. The freshly formed Ialomița County Championship was placed under the authority of the newly created Consiliul Județean pentru Educație Fizică și Sport (lit. 'County Council for Physical Education and Sports') in Ialomița County.

Since then, the structure and organization of Liga IV Ialomița, like those of other county championships, have undergone numerous changes. Between 1968 and 1992, the main county competition was known as the Campionatul Județean (County Championship). Between 1992 and 1997, it was renamed Divizia C – Faza Județeană (Divizia C – County Phase), followed by Divizia D starting in 1997, and since 2006, it has been known as Liga IV.

== Promotion ==
The champions of each county association play against one another in a play-off to earn promotion to Liga III. Geographical criteria are taken into consideration when the play-offs are drawn. In total, there are 41 county champions plus the Bucharest municipal champion.

== List of champions ==
=== Ialomița Regional Championship ===
Ed.	Season	Winners
1	1951	Dinamo Călărași
2	1952	Dinamo Călărași

=== Ialomița County Championship ===
Ed.	Season	Winners
County Championship
1	1968–69	Știința Ciulnița
2	1969–70	Energia Slobozia
3	1970–71	Victoria Lehliu
4	1971–72	Viticola Fetești
5	1972–73	Rapid Fetești
6	1973–74	IPRECA Călărași
7	1974–75	Victoria Lehliu
8	1975–76	Victoria Țăndărei
9	1976–77	Victoria Lehliu
10	1977–78	Rapid Fetești
11	1978–79	Rapid Fetești
12	1979–80	Constructorul Călărași
13	1980–81	Unirea Gârbovi
14	1981–82	Victoria Munteni-Buzău
15	1982–83	Agronomia Slobozia
16	1983–84	Agronomia Slobozia
17	1984–85	Unirea Urziceni
18	1985–86	Rapid Fetești
19	1986–87	Victoria Munteni-Buzău
20	1987–88	Rapid Fetești
21	1988–89	Rapid Fetești
22	1989–90	Unirea Urziceni
23	1990–91	Victoria Țăndărei
24	1991–92	Flacăra Mihail Kogălniceanu
Divizia C – County phase
25	1992–93	Rapid Fetești
26	1993–94	Abatorul Slobozia
27	1994–95	Agricultorul Sfântu Gheorghe
28	1995–96	Abatorul Slobozia
29	1996–97	Agricultorul Balaciu
Divizia D
30	1997–98	Unirea Slobozia
31	1998–99	Agricultorul Urziceni
32	1999–00	Agricultorul Gârbovi
33	2000–01	Ambianța Valea Ciorii
34	2001–02	Rapid Fetești
35	2002–03	Recolta Gheorghe Lazăr
36	2003–04	Partener Slobozia
37	2004–05	Abatorul Slobozia
38	2005–06	Recolta Gheorghe Lazăr

Ed.	Season	Winners
Liga IV
39	2006–07	Abatorul Slobozia
40	2007–08	Recolta Gheorghe Lazăr
41	2008–09	Abatorul Slobozia
42	2009–10	Victoria Țăndărei
43	2010–11	Viitorul Axintele
44	2011–12	Rapid Fetești
45	2012–13	Voința Cocora
46	2013–14	Unirea Fierbinți
47	2014–15	Unirea Fierbinți
48	2015–16	Andrias Andrășești
49	2016–17	Amara
50	2017–18	Abatorul Slobozia
51	2018–19	Recolta Gheorghe Doja
52	2019–20	Bărăganul Ciulnița
53	2020–21	Fetești
54	2021–22	Amara
55	2022–23	Bărăganul Ciulnița
56	2023–24	Fetești
57	2024–25	Rovine
58	2025–26	Bărăganul Ciulnița

== See also ==
=== Main Leagues ===
- Liga I
- Liga II
- Liga III
- Liga IV

=== County Leagues (Liga IV series) ===
North–East

- Liga IV Bacău
- Liga IV Botoșani
- Liga IV Iași
- Liga IV Neamț
- Liga IV Suceava
- Liga IV Vaslui

North–West

- Liga IV Bihor
- Liga IV Bistrița-Năsăud
- Liga IV Cluj
- Liga IV Maramureș
- Liga IV Satu Mare
- Liga IV Sălaj

Center

- Liga IV Alba
- Liga IV Brașov
- Liga IV Covasna
- Liga IV Harghita
- Liga IV Mureș
- Liga IV Sibiu

West

- Liga IV Arad
- Liga IV Caraș-Severin
- Liga IV Gorj
- Liga IV Hunedoara
- Liga IV Mehedinți
- Liga IV Timiș

South–West

- Liga IV Argeș
- Liga IV Dâmbovița
- Liga IV Dolj
- Liga IV Olt
- Liga IV Teleorman
- Liga IV Vâlcea

South

- Liga IV Bucharest
- Liga IV Călărași
- Liga IV Giurgiu
- Liga IV Ialomița
- Liga IV Ilfov
- Liga IV Prahova

South–East

- Liga IV Brăila
- Liga IV Buzău
- Liga IV Constanța
- Liga IV Galați
- Liga IV Tulcea
- Liga IV Vrancea
