= Claudiu Mircea Ionescu =

Romanian footballer

Claudiu Ionescu
Personal information
- Full name: Claudiu Mircea Ionescu
- Date of birth: 20 March 1983 (age 43)
- Place of birth: Buzău, Romania
- Height: 1.74 m (5 ft 9 in)
- Position: Midfielder

Team information
- Current team: Fetești (manager)

Youth career
- Gloria Buzău
- –2000: Rapid București

Senior career*
Years	Team	Apps	(Gls)
2000–2004	Rapid București	1	(0)
2000–2001	→ Electromagnetica București (loan)	2	(0)
2001–2002	→ Rocar București (loan)	8	(0)
2003	→ Electromagnetica București (loan)	10	(2)
2004	→ Cimentul Fieni (loan)	13	(5)
2004–2006	Politehnica Iaşi	12	(0)
2006–2008	Gloria Buzău	46	(14)
2008	Steaua București	0	(0)
2008–2009	Gloria Buzău	17	(2)
2009–2010	FC Timişoara	11	(1)
2010	CSMS Iaşi	11	(0)
2011–2012	Milsami Orhei	17	(3)
2011–2012	→ Aris Limassol (loan)	25	(4)
2012–2013	Foolad	5	(0)
2013	Concordia Chiajna	1	(0)
2014	CF Brăila	14	(2)
2014–2015	Olimpia Râmnicu Sărat	0	(0)
2015–2016	AFC Hărman	11	(1)
2017	Gloria Buzău	0	(0)
2017–2018	Montana Pătârlagele	25	(26)
2018–2019	Locomotiva Buzău	2	(1)
2019–2022	Team Săgeata	6	(4)
2022	Voința Limpeziș	9	(10)
2022–2023	Victoria Gugești	22	(14)
Total		268	(89)

Managerial career
- 2015–2016: AFC Hărman (player/coach)
- 2019–2020: Concordia Chiajna (youth)
- 2020–2021: Concordia II Chiajna
- 2021–2024: Concordia Chiajna U19
- 2024: Concordia Chiajna (caretaker)
- 2024: ACS FC Dinamo
- 2024: Voința Limpeziș
- 2024–: Fetești
- * Club domestic league appearances and goals

Claudiu Mircea Ionescu (born 20 March 1983) is a former Romanian football player.

== Honours ==
Electromagnetica București

- Divizia C: 2000–01

Rapid București

- Divizia A: 2002–03
