= 2022–23 Liga IV =

81st season of Romanian football league

Liga IV
- Season: 2022–23

The 2022–23 Liga IV was the 81st season of Liga IV and the 55th since the 1968 administrative and territorial reorganization of the country, representing the fourth tier of the Romanian football league system. The champions of each county association played against one from a neighbouring county in a play-off for promotion to Liga III.

The counties were divided into seven regions, each consisting of six counties and the draw was made on 2 February 2023.

== County leagues ==
North–East

- Bacău (BC)
- Botoșani (BT)
- Iași (IS)
- Neamț (NT)
- Suceava (SV)
- Vaslui (VS)

North–West

- Bihor (BH)
- Bistrița-Năsăud (BN)
- Cluj (CJ)
- Maramureș (MM)
- Satu Mare (SM)
- Sălaj (SJ)

Center

- Alba (AB)
- Brașov (BV)
- Covasna (CV)
- Harghita (HR)
- Mureș (MS)
- Sibiu (SB)

West

- Arad (AR)
- Caraș-Severin (CS)
- Gorj (GJ)
- Hunedoara (HD)
- Mehedinți (MH)
- Timiș (TM)

South–West

- Argeș (AG)
- Dâmbovița (DB)
- Dolj (DJ)
- Olt (OT)
- Teleorman (TR)
- Vâlcea (VL)

South

- Bucharest (B)
- Călărași (CL)
- Giurgiu (GR)
- Ialomița (IL)
- Ilfov (IF)
- Prahova (PH)

South–East

- Brăila (BR)
- Buzău (BZ)
- Constanța (CT)
- Galați (GL)
- Tulcea (TL)
- Vrancea (VN)

== Promotion play-off ==
The matches were played on played on 17 and 24 June 2023.

Team 1	Agg.	Team 2	1st leg	2nd leg
Region 1 (North-East)				
Viitorul Curița (BC)	w/o (Note: Victoria Horia does not meet the conditions for participation in the promotion play-off to Liga 3)	(NT) Victoria Horia	w/o	w/o
Unirea Curtești (BT)	5–6	(SV) Viitorul Liteni	2–4	3–2
Vaslui (VS)	7–3	(IS) Moldova Cristești	3–1	4–2
Region 2 (North-West)				
Luceafărul Bălan (SJ)	3–13	(SM) Olimpia MCMXXI Satu Mare	2–5	1–8
Crișul Sântandrei (BH)	5–4	(CJ) Arieșul Mihai Viteazu	2–1	3–3
Academica Recea (MM)	2–1	(BN) Minerul Rodna	1–1	1–0
Region 3 (Center)				
Industria Galda (AB)	4–0	(CV) Prima Brăduț	3–0	1–0
Gheorgheni (HR)	2–5	(SB) Mediaș	2–1	0–4
Iernut (MS)	2–4	(BV) Ciucaș Tărlungeni	2–2	0–2
Region 4 (West)				
Recolta Dănceu (MH)	1–3	(AR) Socodor	0–3 (Note: The match was interrupted in the 47th minute, at the score of 0–2, after the referee was hit by a player of the home team. The match will be decided on the "green table", with 3–0 for CS Socodor.)	1–0
Gloria Geoagiu (HD)	1–6	(TM) Peciu Nou	0–4	1–2
Turceni (GJ)	2–1	(CS) Slatina-Timiș	1–0	1–1
Region 5 (South-West)				
Rapid Buzescu (TR)	1–6	(VL) Râmnicu Vâlcea	0–2	1–4
Oltul Curtișoara (OT)	2–6	(AG) ARO Muscelul Câmpulung	0–2	2–4
Recolta Gura Șuții (DB)	3–5	(DJ) FCU 1948 Craiova II	2–0	1–5
Region 6 (South)				
LPS HD Clinceni (IF)	1–5	(CL) Progresul Fundulea	0–1	1–4
Bărăganul Ciulnița (IL)	2–7	(GR) Dunărea Giurgiu	1–1	1–6
Daco-Getica București (B)	3–3 (a.e.t.) (8–9 p)	(PH) Tricolorul Breaza	2–2	1–1 (a.e.t.) (8–9 p)
Region 7 (South-East)				
Hamangia Baia (TL)	3–2 (a.e.t.)	(BZ) Montana Pătârlagele	1–0	2–2 (a.e.t.)
Viitorul Șuțești (BR)	2–1	(GL) Voința Cudalbi	0–0	2–1
Victoria Gugești (VN)	4–5	(CT) Axiopolis Cernavodă	1–4	3–1

== League standings ==
=== Alba County ===
Team changes from the previous season

- CSU Alba Iulia achieved promotion to Liga III.
- Cuprirom Abrud (Series I winners) was promoted from Liga V Alba.
- Nicolae Linca Cergău (Series II winners) declined promotion from Liga V Alba.
- Târnavele Tiur (16th place) was relegated to Liga V Alba.
- Olimpia Aiud withdrew.
- GT Sport Alba Iulia (15th place) was spared from relegation.

Pos	Team	Pld	W	D	L	GF	GA	GD	Pts	Qualification or relegation
1	Industria Galda (C, Q)	26	21	3	2	76	15	+61	66	Qualification to promotion play-off
2	Viitorul Sântimbru	26	18	6	2	74	21	+53	60	
3	CIL Blaj	26	14	3	9	63	59	+4	45	
4	Performanța Ighiu	26	13	5	8	65	43	+22	44	
5	Viitorul Vama Seacă	26	13	3	10	64	45	+19	42	
6	Voința Stremț	26	12	3	11	64	48	+16	39	
7	Zlatna	26	10	5	11	48	70	−22	35	
8	Inter Unirea	26	9	7	10	45	48	−3	34	
9	Kinder Teiuș	26	9	5	12	52	64	−12	32	
10	Spicul Daia Romană	26	9	5	12	45	63	−18	32	
11	GT Sport Alba Iulia	26	7	5	14	46	64	−18	26	
12	Energia Săsciori	26	6	7	13	39	50	−11	25	
13	Hidromecanica Șugag (R)	26	5	5	16	59	75	−16	20	Relegation to Liga V Alba
14	Cuprirom Abrud (R)	26	3	4	19	31	106	−75	13	Relegation to Liga V Alba

Rules for classification: 1) Points; 2) Head-to-head points; 3) Head-to-head goal difference; 4) Head-to-head goals scored; 5) Head-to-head away goals scored; 6) Goal difference; 7) Goals scored.
(C) Champions; (Q) Qualified for the phase indicated; (R) Relegated

=== Arad County ===
Team changes from the previous season

- ACB Ineu achieved promotion to Liga III.
- Frontiera Curtici was relegated from Liga III.
- Viitorul Arad (Seria B winners), Victoria Nădlac (Seria A runners-up) and Voința Macea (Seria B runners-up) were promoted from Liga V Arad.
- Șoimii Lipova II (Seria B winners) and Avântul Târnova (Seria C winners) declined promotion from Liga V Arad.
- Olimpia Bocsig (Seria C runners-up) from Liga V Arad entered in partnership with ACB Ineu, forming ACB Ineu II.

Pos	Team	Pld	W	D	L	GF	GA	GD	Pts	Qualification or relegation
1	Socodor (C, Q)	26	18	7	1	81	26	+55	61 (Note: Socodor are ahead of Unirea Sântana on Head-to-head away goals scored: Unirea Sântana 3–2 Socodor, Socodor 1–0 Unirea Sântana.)	Qualification to promotion play-off
2	Unirea Sântana	26	18	7	1	94	25	+69	61	
3	Victoria Felnac	26	17	6	3	53	21	+32	57	
4	Viitorul Arad	26	13	7	6	61	32	+29	46	
5	Frontiera Curtici	26	13	6	7	63	30	+33	45	
6	Șoimii Șimand	26	12	7	7	55	47	+8	43	
7	Păulișana Păuliș	26	10	7	9	55	47	+8	37	
8	Podgoria Pâncota	26	10	6	10	34	37	−3	36	
9	Voința Macea	26	9	4	13	43	65	−22	31	
10	ACB Ineu II	26	7	2	17	54	76	−22	23 (Note: ACB Ineu II are ahead of Glogovăț on Head-to-head goal difference: Glogovăț 0–2 ACB Ineu II, ACB Ineu II 2–3 Glogovăț.)	
11	Glogovăț	26	6	5	15	28	52	−24	23	
12	Beliu (R)	26	4	6	16	36	68	−32	18	Relegation to Liga V Arad
13	Victoria Nădlac (R)	26	3	4	19	40	115	−75	13	Relegation to Liga V Arad
14	Victoria Zăbrani (R)	26	2	6	18	22	78	−56	12	Relegation to Liga V Arad

Rules for classification: 1) Points; 2) Head-to-head points; 3) Head-to-head goal difference; 4) Head-to-head goals scored; 5) Head-to-head away goals scored; 6) Goal difference; 7) Goals scored.
(C) Champions; (Q) Qualified for the phase indicated; (R) Relegated

=== Argeș County ===
Team changes from the previous season

- CS Rucăr achieved promotion to Liga III.
- Vulturii Vulturești (North Series winners), Star Sport Argeș (Center Series winners) and ACS Miroși (South Series winners) declined promotion from Liga V Argeș.
- FC Argeș Pitești II and Sporting Pitești withdrew.
- Juventus Victoria Bascov (14th place) and ACS Bălilești (15th place) were spared from relegation.
- Internațional Valea Iașului, CS Domnești, Sola Grația Dragoslavele, Viitorul Rucăr and Muscelul Câmpulung Elite II were admitted upon request.
- Inter Câmpulung was renamed ARO Muscelul Câmpulung.

Pos	Team	Pld	W	D	L	GF	GA	GD	Pts	Qualification or relegation
1	ARO Muscelul Câmpulung (C, Q)	30	29	0	1	136	12	+124	87 (Note: ARO Muscelul Câmpulung are ahead of Speed Academy Pitești on Head-to-head goal difference: ARO Muscelul 2–0 Speed Academy, Speed Academy 1–0 ARO Muscelul.)	Qualification to promotion play-off
2	Speed Academy Pitești	30	29	0	1	129	13	+116	87	
3	Domnești	30	21	2	7	91	40	+51	65	
4	Internațional Valea Iașului	30	19	3	8	101	55	+46	60	
5	Energia Stolnici	30	18	3	9	98	62	+36	57	
6	Sola Grația Dragoslavele	30	16	4	10	99	62	+37	52	
7	Viitorul Bârla	30	12	3	15	78	110	−32	39	
8	Mioveni II	30	11	3	16	67	105	−38	36	
9	Viitorul Rucăr	30	10	1	19	64	102	−38	31	
10	Poiana Lacului	30	9	4	17	51	94	−43	31	
11	Costești	30	8	4	18	55	77	−22	28	
12	DLR Pitești	30	7	6	17	46	99	−53	27	
13	Suseni	30	8	2	20	62	106	−44	26	
14	Muscelul Câmpulung Elite II	30	8	1	21	47	81	−34	25	
15	Muscelul Lerești	30	6	6	18	54	94	−40	24	
16	Juventus Victoria Bascov	30	6	4	20	65	131	−66	22	
17	Victoria Buzoești (Note: Victoria Buzoești withdrew after 11 rounds and all its results were canceled.) (D)	0	0	0	0	0	0	0	0	Withdrew
18	Bălilești (Note: Bălilești withdrew after 9 rounds and all its results were canceled.) (D)	0	0	0	0	0	0	0	0	Withdrew

Rules for classification: 1) Points; 2) Head-to-head points; 3) Head-to-head goal difference; 4) Head-to-head goals scored; 5) Head-to-head away goals scored; 6) Goal difference; 7) Goals scored.
(C) Champions; (D) Disqualified; (Q) Qualified for the phase indicated

=== Bacău County ===
The Liga IV Bacău County was played with twenty-two teams, split into two series of twelve and ten teams in a double round-robin regular season, followed by a championship play-off between the top two teams from each series, played over six matches per team. Teams entered the play-off with all points and goal difference obtained against the top nine teams in their series. Only clubs with legal personality, holding a C.I.S. (Certificate of Sports Identity), and fielding at least one youth team were eligible to participate.

Team changes from the previous season

- Voința Gârleni, Dinamo Bacău II, Viitorul Urechești and Vulturul Măgirești withdrew.
- Voința Oituz and CS Dofteana were admitted upon request.
- Viitorul/CSȘ Onești was renamed Viitorul Curița, as the partnership between Viitorul and CSȘ Onești had ended.

Series I

Pos	Team	Pld	W	D	L	GF	GA	GD	Pts	Qualification or relegation
1	Gauss Bacău (Q)	16	14	2	0	66	23	+43	44	Qualification to championship play-off
2	Faraoani	16	9	3	4	44	25	+19	30	Ineligible for promotion
3	Siretu Săucești (Q)	16	9	3	4	37	25	+12	30	Qualification to championship play-off
4	Unirea Bacău	16	8	1	7	36	28	+8	25	
5	Negri	16	8	0	8	30	31	−1	24	
6	Filipești	16	7	2	7	35	37	−2	23	
7	Viitorul Nicolae Bălcescu	16	5	3	8	28	22	+6	18	
8	Rapid Bacău	16	2	2	12	20	54	−34	8	
9	Flamura Roșie Sascut	16	2	0	14	12	63	−51	6	
10	Viitorul Berești-Tazlău (Note: Viitorul Berești-Tazlău was excluded after 5 rounds and all its results were canceled.) (D)	0	0	0	0	0	0	0	0	Excluded

Rules for classification: 1) Points; 2) Head-to-head points; 3) Head-to-head goal difference; 4) Head-to-head goals scored; 5) Head-to-head away goals scored; 6) Goal difference; 7) Goals scored.
(D) Disqualified; (Q) Qualified for the phase indicated
Notes:

Series II

Pos	Team	Pld	W	D	L	GF	GA	GD	Pts	Qualification or relegation
1	Viitorul Curița (Q)	22	21	0	1	108	10	+98	63	Qualification to championship play-off
2	Sportul Onești (Q)	22	20	1	1	134	21	+113	61	Qualification to championship play-off
3	Moinești	22	15	0	7	73	41	+32	45	
4	Uzu Dărmănești	22	14	2	6	45	31	+14	44	
5	Bârsănești	22	10	3	9	39	36	+3	33	
6	Voința Oituz	22	10	2	10	57	65	−8	32	
7	Măgura Cașin	22	9	2	11	30	51	−21	29	
8	Dofteana	22	7	2	13	37	54	−17	23	
9	Voința Brătești	22	7	2	13	47	71	−24	23	
10	Viitorul Căiuți	22	5	1	16	20	75	−55	16	
11	Bradul Mânăstirea Cașin	22	3	2	17	15	82	−67	11	
12	Măgura Târgu Ocna	22	1	3	18	11	79	−68	6	

Rules for classification: 1) Points; 2) Head-to-head points; 3) Head-to-head goal difference; 4) Head-to-head goals scored; 5) Head-to-head away goals scored; 6) Goal difference; 7) Goals scored.
(Q) Qualified for the phase indicated

Championship play-off

Pos	Team	Pld	W	D	L	GF	GA	GD	Pts	Qualification
1	Viitorul Curița (C, Q)	6	4	1	1	94	14	+80	58	Qualification to promotion play-off
2	Sportul Onești	6	4	1	1	112	29	+83	56	
3	Gauss Bacău	6	2	2	2	81	40	+41	52	
4	Siretu Săucești	6	0	0	6	46	53	−7	30	

Rules for classification: 1) Points; 2) Head-to-head points; 3) Head-to-head goal difference; 4) Head-to-head goals scored; 5) Head-to-head away goals scored; 6) Goal difference; 7) Goals scored.
(C) Champions; (Q) Qualified for the phase indicated

=== Bihor County ===
The Liga IV Bihor County was played in a double round-robin format across two series, followed by a championship play-off with eight teams (the top four from each series, starting from scratch) and a relegation play-out (also split into two series, with teams maintaining the points accumulated in the first stage).

Team changes from the previous season

- Luceafărul Oradea was relegated from Liga III.
- CS Vadu Crișului (Series I winners), Vulturul Dobrești (Series II winners) and Unirea Roșia (Series II runners-up and play-off winners (Note: Unirea Roșia defeated Inter Aștileu 1–0 away and 2–1 at home, the runner-up of Series I, in the promotion play-off.)) were promoted from Liga V Bihor.
- Nojorid Livada and Voința Ciumeghiu withdrew
- Izvorul Cociuba Mare (9th place in Series II of the regular season) was spared from relegation.
- Lotus Băile Felix II and FC Bihor Oradea II were admitted upon request.
- CA Oradea took the place of CA Oradea II after ceding its Liga III spot.
- Vulturul Dobrești was renamed Viitorul Dobrești.

Series I (North)

Pos	Team	Pld	W	D	L	GF	GA	GD	Pts	Qualification
1	Diosig Bihardiószeg	10	8	2	0	39	4	+35	26	Qualification to championship play-off
2	Vulturii Săcueni	10	6	2	2	37	7	+30	20 (Note: 1.Vulturii Săcueni 5P. (+4) 2.Viitorul Borș 5P. (+2) 3.Oșorhei 4P. 4.Foresta Tileagd 1P. (Table of head-to-head matches))	Qualification to championship play-off
3	Viitorul Borș (Note: Viitorul Borș and Lotus Băile Felix II withdrew at the end of the regular season.)	10	5	5	0	47	14	+33	20	Withdrew
4	Oșorhei	10	6	2	2	25	12	+13	20	Qualification to championship play-off
5	Foresta Tileagd	10	6	2	2	37	13	+24	20	Qualification to championship play-off
6	Crișul Aleșd	10	4	2	4	22	11	+11	14	Qualification to championship play-out
7	Lotus Băile Felix II	10	4	0	6	26	36	−10	12	Withdrew
8	Unirea Valea lui Mihai	10	3	2	5	27	25	+2	11	Qualification to championship play-out
9	Vadu Crișului	10	3	1	6	15	27	−12	10	Qualification to championship play-out
10	Slovan Valea Cerului	10	0	0	10	4	79	−75	0	Qualification to championship play-out
11	Luceafărul Oradea	10	1	0	9	10	61	−51	−47 (Note: Luceafărul Oradea were deducted 50 points due to financial debts to former players and managers.)	Qualification to championship play-out

Rules for classification: 1) Points; 2) Head-to-head points; 3) Head-to-head goal difference; 4) Head-to-head goals scored; 5) Head-to-head away goals scored; 6) Goal difference; 7) Goals scored.
Notes:

Series II (South)

Pos	Team	Pld	W	D	L	GF	GA	GD	Pts	Qualification
1	Bihorul Beiuș	9	7	1	1	31	9	+22	22 (Note: Bihorul Beiuș–Crișul Sântandrei 1–0 (Head-to-head matches))	Qualification to championship play-off
2	Crișul Sântandrei	9	7	1	1	28	6	+22	22	Qualification to championship play-off
3	Olimpia Salonta	9	7	0	2	21	6	+15	21	Qualification to championship play-off
4	Universitatea Oradea	9	6	0	3	27	15	+12	18	Qualification to championship play-off
5	Bihor Oradea II	9	4	3	2	20	18	+2	15	Qualification to championship play-out
6	CA Oradea	9	4	1	4	36	15	+21	13	Qualification to championship play-out
7	Victoria Avram Iancu	9	3	0	6	20	32	−12	9	Qualification to championship play-out
8	Viitorul Dobrești	9	1	2	6	7	29	−22	5	Qualification to championship play-out
9	Izvorul Cociuba Mare	9	1	0	8	6	48	−42	3	Qualification to championship play-out
10	Unirea Roșia	9	0	2	7	10	28	−18	2	Qualification to championship play-out

Rules for classification: 1) Points; 2) Head-to-head points; 3) Head-to-head goal difference; 4) Head-to-head goals scored; 5) Head-to-head away goals scored; 6) Goal difference; 7) Goals scored.
Notes:

Championship play-off

Pos	Team	Pld	W	D	L	GF	GA	GD	Pts	Qualification
1	Crișul Sântandrei (C, Q)	14	9	4	1	29	12	+17	31	Qualification for promotion play-off
2	Diosig Bihardiószeg	14	8	4	2	24	11	+13	28	
3	Vulturii Săcueni	14	6	3	5	25	25	0	21 (Note: 1.Vulturii Săcueni 7P. 2.Bihorul Beiuș 6P. 3.Foresta Tileagd 4P. (Table of head-to-head matches))	
4	Bihorul Beiuș	14	6	3	5	22	19	+3	21	
5	Foresta Tileagd	14	6	3	5	28	27	+1	21	
6	Oșorhei	14	4	2	8	18	27	−9	14	
7	Olimpia Salonta	14	3	3	8	18	28	−10	12	
8	Universitatea Oradea	14	2	2	10	19	34	−15	8	

Rules for classification: 1) Points; 2) Head-to-head points; 3) Head-to-head goal difference; 4) Head-to-head goals scored; 5) Head-to-head away goals scored; 6) Goal difference; 7) Goals scored.
(C) Champions; (Q) Qualified for the phase indicated
Notes:

Championship play-out
Series I (North)

Pos	Team	Pld	W	D	L	GF	GA	GD	Pts	Relegation
5	Crișul Aleșd	8	6	0	2	26	6	+20	32	
6	Unirea Valea lui Mihai	8	6	0	2	22	4	+18	29	
7	Vadu Crișului	8	3	1	4	10	13	−3	20	
8	Slovan Valea Cerului	8	2	0	6	8	32	−24	6	
9	Luceafărul Oradea (R)	8	2	1	5	9	20	−11	−71	Relegation to Liga V Bihor

Rules for classification: 1) Points; 2) Head-to-head points; 3) Head-to-head goal difference; 4) Head-to-head goals scored; 5) Head-to-head away goals scored; 6) Goal difference; 7) Goals scored.
(R) Relegated

Series II (South)

Pos	Team	Pld	W	D	L	GF	GA	GD	Pts	Relegation
5	CA Oradea	10	9	1	0	49	13	+36	41	
6	Bihor Oradea II	10	4	1	5	18	19	−1	28	
7	Victoria Avram Iancu	10	5	1	4	22	23	−1	25	
8	Unirea Roșia	10	6	1	3	24	20	+4	21	
9	Viitorul Dobrești	10	3	0	7	16	33	−17	14	
10	Izvorul Cociuba Mare (R)	10	1	0	9	12	33	−21	6	Relegation to Liga V Bihor

Rules for classification: 1) Points; 2) Head-to-head points; 3) Head-to-head goal difference; 4) Head-to-head goals scored; 5) Head-to-head away goals scored; 6) Goal difference; 7) Goals scored.
(R) Relegated

=== Bistrița-Năsăud County ===
Team changes from the previous season

- Progresul Năsăud, Atletico Monor, Hebe Sângeorz-Băi, Eciro Forest Telciu, ACS Dumitra, Dinamo Uriu, Voința Matei, AS Archiud, Viitorul Budești and CS Valea Bârgăului were admitted upon request.
- Venus Negrilești withdrew.

South Series

Pos	Team	Pld	W	D	L	GF	GA	GD	Pts	Qualification
1	Atletico Monor (Q)	18	15	1	2	78	26	+52	46	Qualification to championship play-off
2	Dinamo Uriu (Q)	18	13	2	3	57	20	+37	41	Qualification to championship play-off
3	Sportul Beclean (Q)	18	12	2	4	68	32	+36	38	Qualification to championship play-off
4	Săgeata Dumbrăvița	18	11	3	4	63	27	+36	36	
5	Someșul Reteag	18	8	4	6	47	36	+11	28	
6	Real Teaca	18	6	4	8	42	44	−2	22	
7	Voința Matei	18	6	1	11	33	64	−31	19	
8	Voința Mărișelu	18	5	1	12	29	45	−16	16	
9	Archiud	18	4	0	14	31	82	−51	12	
10	Viitorul Budești	18	1	0	17	21	93	−72	3	

Rules for classification: 1) Points; 2) Head-to-head points; 3) Head-to-head goal difference; 4) Head-to-head goals scored; 5) Head-to-head away goals scored; 6) Goal difference; 7) Goals scored.
(Q) Qualified for the phase indicated

North Series

Pos	Team	Pld	W	D	L	GF	GA	GD	Pts	Qualification
1	Minerul Rodna (Q)	16	14	2	0	81	12	+69	44	Qualification to championship play-off
2	Silvicultorul Maieru (Q)	16	13	1	2	101	22	+79	40	Qualification to championship play-off
3	Progresul Năsăud (Q)	16	12	1	3	71	19	+52	37	Qualification to championship play-off
4	Eciro Forest Telciu	16	10	2	4	38	24	+14	32	
5	Heniu Leșu	16	6	1	9	26	58	−32	19	
6	Valea Bârgăului	16	4	4	8	20	51	−31	16	
7	Dumitra	16	1	5	10	19	64	−45	8	
8	Someșul Feldru	16	1	3	12	17	73	−56	6	
9	Hebe Sângeorz-Băi	16	1	1	14	16	66	−50	4	

Rules for classification: 1) Points; 2) Head-to-head points; 3) Head-to-head goal difference; 4) Head-to-head goals scored; 5) Head-to-head away goals scored; 6) Goal difference; 7) Goals scored.
(Q) Qualified for the phase indicated

Championship play-off

The teams started the play-off with all the records achieved in the regular season against the other qualified teams from series and played only against the teams from the other series.

Pos	Team	Pld	W	D	L	GF	GA	GD	Pts	Qualification
1	Minerul Rodna (C, Q)	10	6	1	3	26	18	+8	19	Qualification to promotion play-off
2	Atletico Monor	10	6	0	4	24	25	−1	18	
3	Progresul Năsăud	10	5	1	4	29	21	+8	16	
4	Dinamo Uriu	10	4	1	5	17	18	−1	13	
5	Sportul Beclean	10	3	2	5	21	32	−11	11	
6	Silvicultorul Maieru	10	3	1	6	23	26	−3	10	

Rules for classification: 1) Points; 2) Head-to-head points; 3) Head-to-head goal difference; 4) Head-to-head goals scored; 5) Head-to-head away goals scored; 6) Goal difference; 7) Goals scored.
(C) Champions; (Q) Qualified for the phase indicated

=== Botoșani County ===
Team changes from the previous season

- Sporting Darabani achieved promotion to Liga III.
- FC Sulița, Unirea Săveni, Sportivul Trușești and Rapid Ungureni were admitted upon request

Pos	Team	Pld	W	D	L	GF	GA	GD	Pts	Qualification or relegation
1	Unirea Curtești (C, Q)	28	22	3	3	119	29	+90	69	Qualification to promotion play-off
2	Inter Dorohoi	28	19	3	6	105	43	+62	60	
3	Partizanul Tudora	28	16	6	6	85	58	+27	54	
4	Bucecea	28	17	2	9	78	52	+26	53	
5	Voința Șendriceni	28	15	5	8	75	46	+29	50	
6	Sulița	28	16	2	10	82	71	+11	50	
7	Prosport Vârfu Câmpului	28	14	6	8	72	60	+12	48	
8	Rapid Ungureni	28	13	2	13	75	65	+10	41	
9	Unirea Stăuceni	28	11	4	13	65	71	−6	37	
10	Unirea Săveni	28	10	3	15	68	65	+3	33	
11	Sportivul Trușești	28	8	4	16	63	87	−24	28	
12	Șoimii Bălușeni	28	9	1	18	46	114	−68	28	
13	Flacăra 1907 Flămânzi (R)	28	7	3	18	47	82	−35	24	Relegation to Liga V Botoșani
14	Nord Star Pomârla (R)	28	6	2	20	44	112	−68	20	Relegation to Liga V Botoșani
15	Viitorul Broscăuți (R)	28	2	4	22	41	110	−69	10	Relegation to Liga V Botoșani

Rules for classification: 1) Points; 2) Head-to-head points; 3) Head-to-head goal difference; 4) Head-to-head goals scored; 5) Head-to-head away goals scored; 6) Goal difference; 7) Goals scored.
(C) Champions; (Q) Qualified for the phase indicated; (R) Relegated

=== Brașov County ===
The Liga IV Brașov County was played with a regular season featuring ten teams in a home-and-away format, followed by a championship play-off and a play-out. The top five teams qualified for the play-off and the bottom five for the play-out, both conducted in a double round-robin format, with all points from the regular season carried over and no other records retained.

Team changes from the previous season

- Olimpic Zărnești achieved promotion to Liga III.
- Colțea Brașov (15th place; withdrew) and Olimpic Voila (16th place; withdrew) were relegated to Liga V Brașov.
- ASC Viștea Mare (Făgăraș Series winners) and Olimpia Sânpetru (Brașov Series winners) declined promotion from Liga V Brașov.
- Weidenbach Ghimbav, CSM Făgăraș and ACS Prejmer withdrew.

Pos	Team	Pld	W	D	L	GF	GA	GD	Pts	Qualification
1	Codlea	18	14	3	1	51	13	+38	45	Qualification to championship play-off
2	Inter Cristian	18	14	2	2	68	23	+45	44	Qualification to championship play-off
3	Ciucaș Tărlungeni	18	14	1	3	73	20	+53	43	Qualification to championship play-off
4	Cetățenii Ghimbav	18	9	2	7	46	32	+14	29	Qualification to championship play-off
5	Steagu Roșu Brașov	18	8	3	7	44	40	+4	27	Qualification to championship play-off
6	Aripile Brașov	18	9	0	9	50	44	+6	27	Qualification to championship play-out
7	Bucegi Moieciu	18	5	5	8	38	59	−21	20	Qualification to championship play-out
8	Hoghiz	18	2	4	12	26	62	−36	10	Qualification to championship play-out
9	Prietenii Rupea	18	2	1	15	23	62	−39	7	Qualification to championship play-out
10	Chimia Victoria	18	2	1	15	20	84	−64	7	Qualification to championship play-out

Rules for classification: 1) Points; 2) Head-to-head points; 3) Head-to-head goal difference; 4) Head-to-head goals scored; 5) Head-to-head away goals scored; 6) Goal difference; 7) Goals scored.

Championship play-off

Pos	Team	Pld	W	D	L	GF	GA	GD	Pts	Qualification
1	Ciucaș Tărlungeni (C, Q)	8	8	0	0	25	4	+21	67	Qualification to promotion play-off
2	Codlea	8	4	1	3	23	12	+11	58	
3	Inter Cristian	8	3	2	3	30	17	+13	55	
4	Cetățenii Ghimbav	8	3	0	5	20	20	0	38	
5	Steagu Roșu Brașov	8	0	1	7	10	55	−45	28	

Rules for classification: 1) Points; 2) Head-to-head points; 3) Head-to-head goal difference; 4) Head-to-head goals scored; 5) Head-to-head away goals scored; 6) Goal difference; 7) Goals scored.
(C) Champions; (Q) Qualified for the phase indicated

Championship play-out

Pos	Team	Pld	W	D	L	GF	GA	GD	Pts
6	Aripile Brașov	8	3	1	4	24	28	−4	37
7	Bucegi Moieciu	8	4	1	3	25	22	+3	33
8	Hoghiz	8	5	0	3	21	13	+8	25
9	Chimia Victoria	8	4	2	2	18	13	+5	21
10	Prietenii Rupea	8	2	0	6	13	25	−12	13

Rules for classification: 1) Points; 2) Head-to-head points; 3) Head-to-head goal difference; 4) Head-to-head goals scored; 5) Head-to-head away goals scored; 6) Goal difference; 7) Goals scored.

=== Brăila County ===
The Liga IV Brăila County was played in a regular season with eleven teams in a home-and-away format, followed by a championship play-off with six teams and a play-out with five teams. In both phases, teams played each other twice, starting with half of their regular-season points, rounded up, with no other records carried over.

Team changes from the previous season

- CS Făurei and Sportul Chiscani were relegated from Liga III.
- FC Urleasca (Series I winners) and Viitorul Cireșu (Series II winners) were promoted from Liga V Brăila.
- Dacia Bertești (6th place; withdrew) and Viitorul Însurăței (7th place; withdrew) were relegated to Liga V Brăila.
- Tricolorul Lanurile and Dinamic Unirea were admitted upon request.

Pos	Team	Pld	W	D	L	GF	GA	GD	Pts	Qualification or relegation
1	Viitorul Cireșu	20	16	4	0	92	18	+74	52	Qualification to championship play-off
2	Viitorul Șuțești	20	16	2	2	106	14	+92	50	Qualification to championship play-off
3	Victoria Traian	20	15	2	3	90	20	+70	47	Qualification to championship play-off
4	Sportul Chiscani	20	10	3	7	58	47	+11	33	Qualification to championship play-off
5	Daous Dava 2018 Brăila	20	10	1	9	52	55	−3	31	Qualification to championship play-off
6	Comunal Cazasu	20	8	1	11	39	62	−23	25	Qualification to championship play-off
7	Voința Vișani (Note: Voința Vișani and Urleasca withdrew before the start of the second half of the regular season and lost all remaining matches with 0–3.)	19	6	1	12	26	46	−20	19	Qualification to championship play-out
8	Urleasca	19	6	1	12	20	42	−22	19	Qualification to championship play-out
9	Tricolorul Lanurile	20	4	3	13	34	92	−58	15	Qualification to championship play-out
10	Dinamic Unirea	20	4	2	14	31	77	−46	14	Qualification to championship play-out
11	Făurei	20	4	0	16	26	101	−75	12	Qualification to championship play-out

Rules for classification: 1) Points; 2) Head-to-head points; 3) Head-to-head goal difference; 4) Head-to-head goals scored; 5) Head-to-head away goals scored; 6) Goal difference; 7) Goals scored.
Notes:

Championship play-off

Pos	Team	Pld	W	D	L	GF	GA	GD	Pts	Qualification
1	Viitorul Șuțești (C, Q)	10	8	1	1	39	8	+31	50	Qualification to promotion play-off
2	Victoria Traian	10	8	1	1	43	9	+34	49	
3	Viitorul Cireșu	10	7	0	3	42	16	+26	47	
4	Sportul Chiscani	10	4	0	6	21	20	+1	29	
5	Daous Dava 2018 Brăila	10	2	0	8	12	46	−34	22	
6	Comunal Cazasu	10	0	0	10	8	66	−58	13	

Rules for classification: 1) Points; 2) Head-to-head points; 3) Head-to-head goal difference; 4) Head-to-head goals scored; 5) Head-to-head away goals scored; 6) Goal difference; 7) Goals scored.
(C) Champions; (Q) Qualified for the phase indicated

Championship play-out

Pos	Team	Pld	W	D	L	GF	GA	GD	Pts	Qualification or relegation
7	Dinamic Unirea	6	5	0	1	22	11	+11	22	
8	Făurei	6	4	0	2	16	14	+2	18	
9	Tricolorul Lanurile	6	3	0	3	22	17	+5	17	
10	Voința Vișani (Note: Voința Vișani and Urleasca withdrew before the start of the second part of the regular season and lost all remaining matches with 0–3.)	3	0	0	3	0	9	−9	10	Withdrew
11	Urleasca	3	0	0	3	0	9	−9	10	Withdrew

Rules for classification: 1) Points; 2) Head-to-head points; 3) Head-to-head goal difference; 4) Head-to-head goals scored; 5) Head-to-head away goals scored; 6) Goal difference; 7) Goals scored.

=== Bucharest ===
The Liga IV Bucharest was played in a regular season with fourteen teams in a home-and-away format, followed by a championship play-off contested by the top four teams in a single round-robin tournament. Teams started the play-off with bonus points based on their regular-season position: 1st place – 3 points, 2nd place – 2 points, 3rd place – 1 point, and 4th place – 0 points.

Team changes from the previous season

- Dinamo București achieved promotion to Liga III.
- Team One Academy București (Series I winners) and Tracțiunea București (Series II winners) declined promotion from Liga V Bucharest.
- Metropolitan Fotbal & Motor Club București (14th place) was relegated to Liga V Bucharest.
- Dan Chilom București withdrew.
- ACP 3 Kids Sport and Turistul București were admitted upon request.

Pos	Team	Pld	W	D	L	GF	GA	GD	Pts	Qualification or relegation
1	ACS FC Dinamo București	26	24	1	1	174	13	+161	73	Qualification to championship play-off
2	Daco-Getica București	26	20	3	3	123	21	+102	63	Qualification to championship play-off
3	Progresul 2005 București	26	20	0	6	111	36	+75	60	Qualification to championship play-off
4	Știința București	26	15	4	7	79	39	+40	49	Qualification to championship play-off
5	Romprim București	26	14	4	8	70	48	+22	46	
6	Sportivii București	26	13	3	10	79	66	+13	42	
7	Venus 1914 București	26	12	1	13	46	73	−27	37	
8	Sportul D&A București	26	11	3	12	63	69	−6	36	
9	Metaloglobus București II	26	10	3	13	60	58	+2	33	
10	ACP 3 Kids Sport	26	7	5	14	44	68	−24	26	
11	Asalt București (Note: Asalt București withdrew in the second half of the season and lost all remaining matches with 0–3.)	26	7	2	17	33	55	−22	23	
12	Rapid FNG București	26	5	4	17	39	93	−54	19	
13	Pro Team București	26	6	0	20	42	108	−66	18	Relegation to Liga V Bucharest
14	Turistul București	26	1	1	24	19	235	−216	4	Relegation to Liga V Bucharest

Rules for classification: 1) Points; 2) Head-to-head points; 3) Head-to-head goal difference; 4) Head-to-head goals scored; 5) Head-to-head away goals scored; 6) Goal difference; 7) Goals scored.
Notes:

Championship play-off

All matches were played at Romprim Stadium in Bucharest on 20, 27 May and 3 June 2023.

Pos	Team	Pld	W	D	L	GF	GA	GD	Pts	Qualification
1	Daco-Getica București (C, Q)	3	2	1	0	10	5	+5	9	Qualification to promotion play-off
2	ACS FC Dinamo București	3	1	2	0	9	4	+5	8	
3	Știința București	3	0	2	1	4	8	−4	2	
4	Progresul 2005 București	3	0	1	2	5	11	−6	2	

Rules for classification: 1) Points; 2) Head-to-head points; 3) Head-to-head goal difference; 4) Head-to-head goals scored; 5) Head-to-head away goals scored; 6) Goal difference; 7) Goals scored.
(C) Champions; (Q) Qualified for the phase indicated

20 May 2023	ACS FC Dinamo București	1–1	Știința București	Bucharest
15:30 EEST (UTC+3)				Stadium: Romprim Stadium

20 May 2023	Daco-Getica București	3–2	Progresul 2005 București	Bucharest
18:00 EEST (UTC+3)				Stadium: Romprim Stadium

27 May 2023	Progresul 2005 București	3–3	Știința București	Bucharest
15:30 EEST (UTC+3)				Stadium: Romprim Stadium

27 May 2023	ACS FC Dinamo București	3–3	Daco-Getica București	Bucharest
18:00 EEST (UTC+3)				Stadium: Romprim Stadium

3 June 2023	Daco-Getica București	4–0	Știința București	Bucharest
15:30 EEST (UTC+3)				Stadium: Romprim Stadium

3 June 2023	ACS FC Dinamo București	5–0	Progresul 2005 București	Bucharest
18:00 EEST (UTC+3)				Stadium: Romprim Stadium

=== Buzău County ===
Team changes from the previous season

- Voința Limpeziș achieved promotion to Liga III.
- Carpați Nehoiu (Series I winners) and Luceafărul Maxenu (Series II winners) were promoted from Liga V Buzău.
- Flamura Racovițeni (Series III winners) declined promotion Liga V Buzău.
- Energia Clondiru (16th place) and Săhăteni Vintileanca (17th place) were relegated to Liga V Buzău.
- Partizanul Merei and Recolta Sălcioara withdrew during the previous season.
- Viitorul Berca was renamed Petrolul Berca.

Pos	Team	Pld	W	D	L	GF	GA	GD	Pts	Qualification or relegation
1	Montana Pătârlagele (C, Q)	30	25	4	1	111	21	+90	79 (Note: Montana Pătârlagele are ahead of Team Săgeata on goal difference.)	Qualification to promotion play-off=
2	Team Săgeata	30	26	1	3	119	34	+85	79	
3	Știința Cernătești	30	25	2	3	97	33	+64	77	
4	Gloria Vadu Pașii	30	19	3	8	83	33	+50	60	
5	Petrolul Berca	30	15	4	11	75	62	+13	49	
6	Voința Lanurile	30	16	3	11	70	51	+19	48 (Note: Voința Lanurile deducted 3 points.)	
7	Voința Balta Albă	30	14	4	12	52	52	0	46	
8	Carpați Nehoiu	30	14	3	13	43	53	−10	45	
9	Pescărușul Luciu	30	11	2	17	60	68	−8	35	
10	Șoimii Siriu	30	11	0	19	45	89	−44	33	
11	Metalul Buzău II	30	10	1	19	61	93	−32	31	
12	Râmnicu Sărat II	30	9	3	18	52	84	−32	30	
13	Unirea Stâlpu	30	10	0	20	44	86	−42	30 (Note: The match Unirea Stâlpu − Luceafărul Maxenu from the 18th round was sanctioned with the loss of the game by forfeit by both teams.)	
14	Luceafărul Maxenu	30	8	4	18	50	78	−28	28	
15	Progresul Beceni (R)	30	6	2	22	42	98	−56	20	Relegation to Liga V Buzău
16	Phoenix Poșta Câlnău (Note: Phoenix Poșta Câlnău was excluded in the second half of the season and lost all remaining matches with 0–3.) (R)	30	2	0	28	15	90	−75	6	Relegation to Liga V Buzău

Rules for classification: 1) Points; 2) Head-to-head points; 3) Head-to-head goal difference; 4) Head-to-head goals scored; 5) Head-to-head away goals scored; 6) Goal difference; 7) Goals scored.
(C) Champions; (Q) Qualified for the phase indicated; (R) Relegated

=== Caraș-Severin County ===
Team changes from the previous season

- Minerul Dognecea (winners) was promoted from Liga V Caraș-Severin.
- Mundo Reșița (12th place) was relegated to Liga V Caraș-Severin.
- Recolta Rafnic withdrew.
- Foresta Armeniș (11th place) was spared from relegation.
- Bistra Glimboca, Voința Lupac II, Narcisa Zervești and Nera Bogodinț were admitted upon request.

Pos	Team	Pld	W	D	L	GF	GA	GD	Pts	Qualification or relegation
1	Slatina-Timiș (C, Q)	26	22	1	3	118	26	+92	67	Qualification to promotion play-off
2	Magica Balta Caransebeș	26	20	3	3	104	18	+86	63	
3	Anina	26	18	2	6	104	44	+60	56	
4	Banatul Ocna de Fier	26	17	3	6	73	48	+25	54	
5	Minerul Dognecea	26	15	4	7	78	39	+39	49	
6	Bistra Glimboca	26	15	2	9	87	69	+18	47	
7	Moldova Nouă	26	14	4	8	80	43	+37	46	
8	Oravița	26	8	4	14	56	58	−2	28	
9	Voința Lupac II	26	8	0	18	40	90	−50	24	
10	Oțelu Roșu	26	7	3	16	34	84	−50	24	
11	Nera Bogodinț	26	7	1	18	38	104	−66	22	
12	Nera Bozovici	26	6	3	17	55	85	−30	21	
13	Narcisa Zervești	26	6	2	18	50	101	−51	20	
14	Foresta Armeniș	26	3	0	23	39	147	−108	9	
15	Rapid Buchin (Note: Rapid Buchin withdrew in the first half of the season and all its results were canceled.) (D)	0	0	0	0	0	0	0	0	Withdrew

Rules for classification: 1) Points; 2) Head-to-head points; 3) Head-to-head goal difference; 4) Head-to-head goals scored; 5) Head-to-head away goals scored; 6) Goal difference; 7) Goals scored.
(C) Champions; (D) Disqualified; (Q) Qualified for the phase indicated

=== Călărași County ===
Team changes from the previous season

- CSM Oltenița was relegated from Liga III.
- Avântul Pietroiu (Series B winners) was promoted from Liga V Călărași.
- Unirea Frăsinet (Series A winners) declined promotion from Liga V Călărași.
- Șoimii Progresu (9th place in Series B) was relegated to Liga V Călărași.
- Tricolorul Jegălia, Progresul Perișoru and Rapid Ulmeni withdrew.
- Conpet Ștefan cel Mare (9th place in Series A) was spared from relegation.
- Colinele Argeșului Mitreni and Viitorul Cascioarele were admitted upon request.
- Petrolul Ileana was renamed Viitorul Ileana.

Series A

Pos	Team	Pld	W	D	L	GF	GA	GD	Pts	Qualification
1	Spicul Vâlcelele	16	14	1	1	83	15	+68	43	Qualification to championship play-off
2	Dunărea Grădiștea	16	12	1	3	58	20	+38	37	Qualification to championship play-off
3	Venus Independența	16	11	2	3	61	18	+43	35	Qualification to championship play-off
4	Dunărea Ciocănești	16	10	1	5	54	27	+27	31	Qualification to championship play-off
5	Avântul Pietroiu	16	7	3	6	51	52	−1	24	Qualification to championship play-out
6	Roseți	16	6	0	10	41	48	−7	18	Qualification to championship play-out
7	Victoria Lehliu	16	3	1	12	33	55	−22	10	Qualification to championship play-out
8	Conpet Ștefan cel Mare	16	2	1	13	21	106	−85	7	Qualification to championship play-out
9	Unirea Dragalina	16	2	0	14	18	79	−61	6	Qualification to championship play-out

Rules for classification: 1) Points; 2) Head-to-head points; 3) Head-to-head goal difference; 4) Head-to-head goals scored; 5) Head-to-head away goals scored; 6) Goal difference; 7) Goals scored.

Series B

Pos	Team	Pld	W	D	L	GF	GA	GD	Pts	Qualification
1	Progresul Fundulea	16	13	2	1	64	10	+54	41	Qualification to championship play-off
2	Viitorul Ileana	16	12	2	2	50	23	+27	38	Qualification to championship play-off
3	Oltenița	16	10	2	4	52	15	+37	32	Qualification to championship play-off
4	Victoria Chirnogi	16	8	4	4	39	22	+17	28	Qualification to championship play-off
5	Partizan Crivăț	16	6	3	7	43	35	+8	21	Qualification to championship play-out
6	Steaua Radovanu	16	5	4	7	22	20	+2	19	Qualification to championship play-out
7	Unirea Mânăstirea	16	4	2	10	41	49	−8	14	Qualification to championship play-out
8	Viitorul Căscioarele	16	2	4	10	25	60	−35	10	Qualification to championship play-out
9	Colinele Argeșului Mitreni	16	0	1	15	14	116	−102	1	Qualification to championship play-out

Rules for classification: 1) Points; 2) Head-to-head points; 3) Head-to-head goal difference; 4) Head-to-head goals scored; 5) Head-to-head away goals scored; 6) Goal difference; 7) Goals scored.

Championship play-out
Series A

Pos	Team	Pld	W	D	L	GF	GA	GD	Pts	Relegation
5	Avântul Pietroiu	4	4	0	0	16	7	+9	12	
6	Roseți	4	3	0	1	10	6	+4	9	
7	Victoria Lehliu	4	2	0	2	13	7	+6	6	
8	Conpet Ștefan cel Mare	4	1	0	3	3	14	−11	3	
9	Unirea Dragalina (R)	4	0	0	4	6	14	−8	0	Relegation to Liga V Călărași

Rules for classification: 1) Points; 2) Head-to-head points; 3) Head-to-head goal difference; 4) Head-to-head goals scored; 5) Head-to-head away goals scored; 6) Goal difference; 7) Goals scored.
(R) Relegated

Series B

Pos	Team	Pld	W	D	L	GF	GA	GD	Pts	Relegation
5	Partizan Crivăț	4	4	0	0	21	5	+16	12	
6	Steaua Radovanu	4	2	1	1	14	3	+11	7	
7	Colinele Argeșului Mitreni	4	1	1	2	6	18	−12	4	
8	Unirea Mânăstirea	4	0	1	3	5	10	−5	1 (Note: The match Unirea Mânăstirea − Viitorul Căscioarele from the 1st round was sanctioned with the loss of the game by forfeit by both teams.)	
9	Viitorul Căscioarele (R)	4	0	1	3	1	11	−10	1	Relegation to Liga V Călărași

Rules for classification: 1) Points; 2) Head-to-head points; 3) Head-to-head goal difference; 4) Head-to-head goals scored; 5) Head-to-head away goals scored; 6) Goal difference; 7) Goals scored.
(R) Relegated
Notes:

Championship play-off
Series A

The semi-finals of the Series A play-off was played on 22 and 29 April 2023.

Team 1	Agg.	Team 2	1st leg	2nd leg
Spicul Vâlcelele	2–1	Venus Independența	1–0	1–1
Dunărea Ciocănești	0–7	Dunărea Grădiștea	0–3	0–4

The Series A final was played on 6 and 13 May 2023.

Team 1	Agg.	Team 2	1st leg	2nd leg
Spicul Vâlcelele	4–2	Dunărea Grădiștea	2–1	2–1

Series B

The semi-finals of the Series B play-off was played on 22 and 29 April 2023.

Team 1	Agg.	Team 2	1st leg	2nd leg
Oltenița	2–3	Progresul Fundulea	1–1	1–2
Victoria Chirnogi	2–6	Viitorul Ileana	1–5	1–1

The Series B final was played on 6 and 13 May 2023.

Team 1	Agg.	Team 2	1st leg	2nd leg
Progresul Fundulea	5–2	Viitorul Ileana	2–1	3–1

Championship final

The championship final played between the winners of the two series on 20 and 27 May 2023.

Team 1	Agg.	Team 2	1st leg	2nd leg
Spicul Vâlcelele	2–5	Progresul Fundulea	1–2	1–3

Progresul Fundulea won the Liga IV Călărași County and qualified for the promotion play-off in Liga III.

=== Cluj County ===
Team changes from the previous season

- Sticla Arieșul Turda was relegated from Liga III.
- Progresul Boian (Câmpia Turzii Zone Cluj winners), Someșul Gilău II (Cluj Zone winners), Young Boys Dej (Dej Zone winners), Luceafărul Orman (Gherla Zone winners) and Unirea Cămărașu (Mociu Zone winners) declined promotion from Liga V Cluj.
- Supporter 2.0 Cluj-Napoca, ACS Florești, Sporting Apahida, Viitorul Poieni and Someșul Gilău withdrew.
- Vulturul Mintiu Gherlii was readmitted after withdrew in the previous season.
- Speranța Jucu and Viitorul Mihai Georgescu were admitted upon request.
- Someșul Dej II was renamed Minerul Ocna Dej II.

Pos	Team	Pld	W	D	L	GF	GA	GD	Pts	Qualification or relegation
1	Arieșul Mihai Viteazu (C, Q)	22	17	3	2	57	15	+42	54	Qualification for the promotion play-off
2	Unirea Tritenii de Jos	22	15	1	6	58	30	+28	46	
3	Victoria Viișoara	22	14	3	5	63	22	+41	45	
4	Vulturul Mintiu Gherlii	22	14	3	5	54	22	+32	45	
5	Minerul Ocna Dej II	22	12	2	8	41	33	+8	38	
6	Unirea Iclod	22	12	2	8	41	29	+12	38	
7	Speranța Jucu	22	11	0	11	34	36	−2	33	
8	Viitorul Mihai Georgescu	22	9	1	12	40	43	−3	28	
9	Sticla Arieșul Turda	22	6	3	13	42	55	−13	21	
10	Viitorul Gârbău	22	6	1	15	29	75	−46	19	
11	Atletic Olimpia Gherla	22	2	3	17	24	52	−28	9	
12	Academia Florești	22	3	0	19	22	93	−71	9	

Rules for classification: 1) Points; 2) Head-to-head points; 3) Head-to-head goal difference; 4) Head-to-head goals scored; 5) Head-to-head away goals scored; 6) Goal difference; 7) Goals scored.
(C) Champions; (Q) Qualified for the phase indicated

=== Constanța County ===
Team changes from the previous season

- Gloria Băneasa was promoted to Liga III.
- CS Lumina (North Series runners-up) and Șoimii Topraisar (South Series runners-up) were promoted Liga V Constanța. (Note: CS Peștera (North Series winners) and Sport Prim Oltina (South Series winners) declined promotion from Liga V Constanța.)
- Voința Valu lui Traian (17th place) and Emaus Cernavodă (18th place) were relegated to Liga V Constanța.
- CSO Murfatlar was admitted upon request.

Pos	Team	Pld	W	D	L	GF	GA	GD	Pts	Qualification or relegation
1	Axiopolis Cernavodă (C, Q)	34	33	0	1	215	28	+187	99	Qualification to promotion play-off
2	Sparta Techirghiol	34	28	2	4	154	50	+104	86	
3	Năvodari	34	26	1	7	136	57	+79	79	
4	Medgidia	34	25	1	8	116	46	+70	76	
5	Poseidon Limanu-2 Mai	34	19	2	13	108	54	+54	59	
6	Portul Constanța	32	19	1	12	82	73	+9	58	
7	Viitorul Hârșova	34	17	5	12	83	71	+12	56	
8	Ovidiu	34	15	7	12	78	79	−1	52	
9	Viitorul Cobadin	34	14	7	13	50	61	−11	49	
10	Victoria Cumpăna	33	15	3	15	68	77	−9	48	
11	Murfatlar	34	11	8	15	53	80	−27	41	
12	Viitorul Pecineaga	34	10	4	20	83	116	−33	34	
13	Lumina	34	11	3	20	79	118	−39	36	
14	Agigea	34	9	7	18	54	100	−46	34	
15	Mihail Kogălniceanu	33	8	5	20	66	123	−57	29	
16	Farul Tuzla	33	8	1	24	41	134	−93	25	
17	Șoimii Topraisar (R)	34	6	1	27	54	128	−74	19	Relegation to Liga V Constanța
18	Știința ACALAB Poarta Albă (R)	33	0	0	33	26	151	−125	0	Relegation to Liga V Constanța

Rules for classification: 1) Points; 2) Head-to-head points; 3) Head-to-head goal difference; 4) Head-to-head goals scored; 5) Head-to-head away goals scored; 6) Goal difference; 7) Goals scored.
(C) Champions; (Q) Qualified for the phase indicated; (R) Relegated

=== Covasna County ===
Team changes from the previous season

- Stăruința Zagon and FC Catalina were admitted upon request.
- ACS Arcuș, FC Păpăuți, Harghita Aita Mare and FC Brețcu reinstated from 2019–20 season.
- Venus Ozun withdrew.

Pos	Team	Pld	W	D	L	GF	GA	GD	Pts	Qualification or relegation
1	Prima Brăduț (C, Q)	25	23	0	2	115	16	+99	69	Qualification to promotion play-off
2	Baraolt	26	19	4	3	118	22	+96	61	
3	Stăruința Zagon	26	17	3	6	89	33	+56	54	
4	Covasna	26	16	2	8	61	40	+21	50	
5	Arcuș	26	14	7	5	83	41	+42	49	
6	Reci	26	13	4	9	55	42	+13	43	
7	Perkö Sânzieni	26	12	5	9	65	48	+17	41	
8	Progresul Sita Buzăului	25	8	4	13	42	74	−32	28	
9	Păpăuți	25	7	4	14	43	69	−26	25	
10	Harghita Aita Mare	26	6	4	16	34	64	−30	22	
11	Nemere Ghelința	25	6	4	15	18	59	−41	22	
12	Brețcu	26	5	4	17	38	107	−69	19	
13	Cernat	26	4	5	17	28	107	−79	17	
14	Catalina	26	3	4	19	25	92	−67	13	

Rules for classification: 1) Points; 2) Head-to-head points; 3) Head-to-head goal difference; 4) Head-to-head goals scored; 5) Head-to-head away goals scored; 6) Goal difference; 7) Goals scored.
(C) Champions; (Q) Qualified for the phase indicated

=== Dâmbovița County ===
Team changes from the previous season

- Bradul Moroeni (North Series winners), Gloria Bucșani (South Series winners) and FC 1976 Potlogi (West Series winners) were promoted from Liga V Dâmbovița.
- Voința Vișina (14th place), Viitorul Răzvad (15th place), Progresul Mătăsaru (16th place) and Gloria Cornești (17th place; withdrew) were relegated to Liga V Dâmbovița.
- Străjerii Târgoviște 1396 merged with Viitorul Răzvad, was moved to Răzvad, and was renamed Străjerii Răzvad.

Pos	Team	Pld	W	D	L	GF	GA	GD	Pts	Qualification or relegation
1	Recolta Gura Șuții (C, Q)	30	26	2	2	116	28	+88	80	Qualification to promotion play-off
2	Roberto Ziduri	30	22	2	6	107	54	+53	68	
3	Urban Titu	30	18	4	8	82	46	+36	58	
4	1976 Potlogi	30	15	7	8	76	51	+25	52	
5	Viitorul Voinești	30	15	4	11	64	50	+14	49	
6	Străjerii Răzvad	30	14	5	11	83	47	+36	47	
7	Bradul Moroeni	30	13	6	11	56	54	+2	45	
8	Burduca	30	11	8	11	87	79	+8	41	
9	Fieni	30	13	2	15	72	89	−17	41	
10	1948 Brezoaele	30	10	5	15	63	79	−16	35	
11	Unirea Bucșani	30	10	5	15	67	88	−21	35	
12	Flacăra Șuța Seacă	30	10	4	16	73	85	−12	34	
13	Voința Crețu (R)	30	10	1	19	52	89	−37	31	Qualification to relegation play-off
14	Gloria Bucșani (R)	30	7	4	19	51	73	−22	25	Qualification to relegation play-off
15	Steagu Roșu Colacu (R)	30	6	4	20	59	122	−63	22	Relegation to Liga V Dâmbovița
16	Unirea Ungureni (R)	30	8	1	21	52	126	−74	19 (Note: Unirea Ungureni deducted 6 points.)	Relegation to Liga V Dâmbovița

Rules for classification: 1) Points; 2) Head-to-head points; 3) Head-to-head goal difference; 4) Head-to-head goals scored; 5) Head-to-head away goals scored; 6) Goal difference; 7) Goals scored.
(C) Champions; (Q) Qualified for the phase indicated; (R) Relegated
Notes:

Relegation play-off

The 13th and 14th-placed teams of the Liga IV faces the 2nd placed teams from the two series of Liga V – Dâmbovița County.

Team 1	Score	Team 2
Voința Tătărani	3–2	Gloria Bucșani
Voința Crețu	1–2	Libertatea Urziceanca

=== Dolj County ===
Team changes from the previous season

- CSO Filiași II (15th place; withdrew) and Victoria Plenița (18th place; withdrew) were relegated to Liga V Dolj.
- Viitorul Giurgița (Series I winners), Progresul Amărăștii de Jos (Series II winners) and Știința Malu Mare (Series III winners) declined promotion from Liga V Dolj.
- Metropolitan Ișalnița II (Series IV winners) from Liga V Dolj did not have the right to promotion as a reserve team.
- Jiul Podari and ACS Mârșani withdrew.
- FCU 1948 Craiova II and Știința Celaru were admitted upon request.
- Dunărea Cetate (13th place, withdrew) was spared from relegation. Subsequently was renamed Tractorul Cetate.
- Progresul Cerăt was renamed as Știința Cerăt.

Pos	Team	Pld	W	D	L	GF	GA	GD	Pts	Qualification or relegation
1	FCU 1948 Craiova II (C, Q)	30	21	6	3	100	34	+66	69	Qualification to promotion play-off
2	Metropolitan Ișalnița	30	21	5	4	74	28	+46	68	
3	Avântul Pielești	30	18	6	6	79	32	+47	60	
4	Cârcea	30	18	5	7	93	38	+55	59	
5	Știința Cerăt	30	18	4	8	87	53	+34	58	
6	Dunărea Calafat	30	18	4	8	64	39	+25	58	
7	Știința Danubius Bechet	30	16	2	12	76	61	+15	50	
8	Unirea Amărăștii de Jos	30	14	6	10	69	60	+9	48	
9	Progresul Băilești	30	15	2	13	68	75	−7	47	
10	Unirea Tricolor Dăbuleni	30	11	2	17	71	79	−8	35	
11	Progresul Segarcea	30	9	6	15	48	65	−17	33	
12	Tractorul Cetate	30	9	4	17	55	84	−29	31	
13	Galicea Mare	30	8	4	18	60	80	−20	28	
14	Știința Celaru	30	6	3	21	57	111	−54	21 (Note: The match Știința Celaru − Viitorul Măceșu de Sus from the 19th round was sanctioned with the loss of the game by forfeit by both teams.)	
15	Flacăra Moțăței	30	4	1	25	34	131	−97	13	
16	Viitorul Măceșu de Sus (Note: Viitorul Măceșu de Sus withdrew after 23 rounds and lost the matches from second part of the season with 0–3.)	30	3	0	27	22	93	−71	9	

Rules for classification: 1) Points; 2) Head-to-head points; 3) Head-to-head goal difference; 4) Head-to-head goals scored; 5) Head-to-head away goals scored; 6) Goal difference; 7) Goals scored.
(C) Champions; (Q) Qualified for the phase indicated

=== Galați County ===
Team changes from the previous season

- Unirea Braniștea achieved promotion to Liga III.
- Răzeșii Valea Mărului (12th place) was relegated to Liga V Galați.
- Lascăr Schela (winners) and Siretul Cosmești (runners-up) were promoted from Liga V Galați.
- Quantum Club Galați and Avântul Vânători withdrew.
- Agrostar Tulucești (11th place) was spared from relegation.
- Alegria JS Matca and Luceafărul Berești were admitted upon request.

Pos	Team	Pld	W	D	L	GF	GA	GD	Pts	Qualification or relegation
1	Voința Cudalbi (C, Q)	22	20	1	1	84	22	+62	61	Qualification to promotion play-off
2	Covurluiul 2021 Târgu Bujor	22	15	2	5	66	34	+32	47	
3	Gloria Ivești	22	14	3	5	76	24	+52	45	
4	Siretul Cosmești	22	13	1	8	49	40	+9	40	
5	Muncitorul Ghidigeni	22	11	2	9	53	42	+11	35	
6	Agrostar Tulucești	22	11	2	9	54	50	+4	35	
7	Luceafărul Berești	22	10	3	9	39	36	+3	33	
8	Viitorul Umbrărești	22	7	4	11	32	45	−13	25	
9	Lascăr Schela	22	5	4	13	38	57	−19	19	
10	Alegria JS Matca	22	6	0	16	36	80	−44	18	
11	Victoria Independența	22	4	3	15	37	80	−43	15	
12	Avântul Drăgănești	22	3	1	18	18	72	−54	10	

Rules for classification: 1) Points; 2) Head-to-head points; 3) Head-to-head goal difference; 4) Head-to-head goals scored; 5) Head-to-head away goals scored; 6) Goal difference; 7) Goals scored.
(C) Champions; (Q) Qualified for the phase indicated

=== Giurgiu County ===
Team changes from the previous season

- Voința Daia (South Series 11th place; withdrew), Argeșul Hotarele (South Series 12th place; withdrew), Argeșul Mihăilești (North Series 9th place; withdrew) and AS Podu Doamnei (North Series 14th place) were relegated to Liga V Giurgiu.
- Inter Valea Dragului (South Series winners) was promoted from Liga V Giurgiu.
- Petrolul Roata de Jos II (North Series winners) did not have the right to promotion from Liga V Giurgiu as a reserve team.
- Voința Slobozia and Real Drăgăneasca withdrew.
- Spicul Izvoru withdrew just before the previous season.

South Series

Pos	Team	Pld	W	D	L	GF	GA	GD	Pts	Qualification or relegation
1	Dunărea Giurgiu (Q)	20	18	1	1	106	9	+97	55	Qualification to championship play-off
2	Victoria Adunații-Copăceni (Q)	20	17	2	1	89	13	+76	53	Qualification to championship play-off
3	Giganții Vărăști	20	13	3	4	64	33	+31	42	
4	Gloria Comana	20	10	1	9	46	36	+10	31	
5	Energia Remuș	20	9	0	11	45	43	+2	27	
6	Real Colibași	20	8	2	10	42	55	−13	26	
7	Dunărea Oinacu	20	7	4	9	34	48	−14	25	
8	Mihai Viteazul Călugăreni	20	6	0	14	24	77	−53	18	
9	Inter Valea Dragului	20	5	0	15	45	80	−35	15	
10	Viitorul Vedea	20	4	3	13	35	108	−73	15	
11	Unirea Izvoarele (R)	20	4	2	14	27	55	−28	14	Relegation to Liga V Giurgiu

Rules for classification: 1) Points; 2) Head-to-head points; 3) Head-to-head goal difference; 4) Head-to-head goals scored; 5) Head-to-head away goals scored; 6) Goal difference; 7) Goals scored.
(Q) Qualified for the phase indicated; (R) Relegated

North Series

Pos	Team	Pld	W	D	L	GF	GA	GD	Pts	Qualification or relegation
1	Viitorul Tântava (Q)	20	17	1	2	107	25	+82	52	Qualification to championship play-off
2	Singureni (Q)	20	16	2	2	91	21	+70	50	Qualification to championship play-off
3	Petrolul Roata de Jos	20	14	1	5	60	29	+31	43	
4	Bolintin Malu Spart	20	13	3	4	65	26	+39	42	
5	Avântul Florești	20	12	1	7	51	30	+21	37	
6	Luceafărul Trestieni	20	9	3	8	40	33	+7	30	
7	Silver Inter Zorile	20	6	2	12	59	73	−14	20	
8	Bolintin-Deal	20	6	1	13	41	80	−39	19	
9	Maxima Hobaia	20	5	2	13	46	88	−42	17	
10	Zmeii Ogrezeni	20	2	2	16	19	72	−53	8	
11	Iepurești (R)	20	0	2	18	19	121	−102	2	Relegation to Liga V Giurgiu

Rules for classification: 1) Points; 2) Head-to-head points; 3) Head-to-head goal difference; 4) Head-to-head goals scored; 5) Head-to-head away goals scored; 6) Goal difference; 7) Goals scored.
(Q) Qualified for the phase indicated; (R) Relegated

Championship play-off

The championship play-off was played between the best two ranked teams in each series of the regular season. All matches was played at Marin Anastasovici Stadium in Giurgiu on 3 and 4 June 2023 the semi-finals and on 10 June 2023 the final.

Semi-finals

Team 1	Score	Team 2
Dunărea Giurgiu	2–0	Singureni
Viitorul Tântava	1–1 (a.e.t.) (4–3 p)	Victoria Adunații-Copăceni

Final

Team 1	Score	Team 2
Dunărea Giurgiu	2–0	Viitorul Tântava

Dunărea Giurgiu won the Liga IV Giurgiu County and qualified for the promotion play-off in Liga III.

=== Gorj County ===
Team changes from the previous season

- Unirea Dragotești (winners) and Gilortul Bengești (runners-up) declined promotion from Liga V Gorj.
- Petrolul Bustuchin withdrew.
- Gilortul Târgu Cărbunești II, Vulturii Fărcășești and AS Jupânești were admitted upon request.
- Pandurii Târgu Jiu was enrolled upon request after withdrawing from Liga III.

Pos	Team	Pld	W	D	L	GF	GA	GD	Pts	Qualification
1	Turceni (C, Q)	22	17	4	1	73	11	+62	55	Qualification to promotion play-off
2	Vulturii Fărcășești	22	17	3	2	71	16	+55	54	
3	Jiul Rovinari	22	15	3	4	58	20	+38	48	
4	Internațional Bălești	22	11	5	6	46	34	+12	38	
5	Unirea Țânțăreni	22	9	6	7	37	39	−2	33	
6	Minerul Motru	22	9	3	10	46	43	+3	30	
7	Petrolul Țicleni	22	7	6	9	38	39	−1	27	
8	Petrolul Stoina	22	8	3	11	44	53	−9	27	
9	Viitorul Negomir	22	8	1	13	38	61	−23	25	
10	Gilortul Târgu Cărbunești II	22	5	3	14	35	55	−20	18	
11	Minerul II Mătăsari	22	5	3	14	28	49	−21	18	
12	Jupânești	22	0	2	20	16	110	−94	2	
13	Pandurii Târgu Jiu (Note: Pandurii Târgu Jiu withdrew after 5 rounds and all its results were canceled.) (D)	0	0	0	0	0	0	0	0	Withdrew

Rules for classification: 1) Points; 2) Head-to-head points; 3) Head-to-head goal difference; 4) Head-to-head goals scored; 5) Head-to-head away goals scored; 6) Goal difference; 7) Goals scored.
(C) Champions; (D) Disqualified; (Q) Qualified for the phase indicated

=== Harghita County ===
The Liga IV Harghita County was played in a double round-robin regular season, followed by a championship play-off held to ensure county champions reached 22 matches as required by Romanian Football Federation rules. The teams finishing 1st and 2nd, as well as those in 3rd and 4th place, played an additional two-legged tie.

Team changes from the previous season

- FC Sânsimion (Ciuc Zone winners) was promoted from Liga V Harghita.
- Farkaslaka Lupeni (11th place) and Reménység Mărtiniș (12th place) were relegated to Liga V Harghita.
- AS Forțeni (Odorhei Zone winners) declined promotion Liga V Harghita.

Pos	Team	Pld	W	D	L	GF	GA	GD	Pts	Qualification or relegation
1	Gheorgheni	20	19	1	0	91	13	+78	58	Qualification to 1–2 place play-off
2	Roseal Odorheiu Secuiesc	20	10	7	3	49	24	+25	37	Qualification to 1–2 place play-off
3	Sânsimion	20	11	2	7	53	49	+4	35	Qualification to 3–4 place play-off
4	Minerul Bălan	20	9	5	6	57	39	+18	32	Qualification to 3–4 place play-off
5	Golimpiakosz Odorheiu Secuiesc	20	8	6	6	43	39	+4	30	
6	Agyagfalvi Lendület Lutița	20	7	6	7	41	32	+9	27	
7	Bradul Zetea	20	6	4	10	25	43	−18	22	
8	Unirea Cristuru Secuiesc	20	6	3	11	36	60	−24	21	
9	Homorod Merești	20	6	2	12	39	61	−22	20	
10	Ezüstfenyő Ciceu	20	5	3	12	34	56	−22	18	
11	Bastya Lăzarea (R)	20	2	3	15	23	75	−52	9	Relegation to Liga V Harghita

Rules for classification: 1) Points; 2) Head-to-head points; 3) Head-to-head goal difference; 4) Head-to-head goals scored; 5) Head-to-head away goals scored; 6) Goal difference; 7) Goals scored.
(R) Relegated

Championship play-off
1–2 place

Pos	Team	Pld	W	D	L	GF	GA	GD	Pts	Qualification
1	Gheorgheni (C, Q)	2	2	0	0	9	3	+6	64	Qualification to promotion play-off
2	Roseal Odorheiu Secuiesc	2	0	0	2	3	9	−6	37	

Rules for classification: 1) Points; 2) Head-to-head points; 3) Head-to-head goal difference; 4) Head-to-head goals scored; 5) Head-to-head away goals scored; 6) Goal difference; 7) Goals scored.
(C) Champions; (Q) Qualified for the phase indicated

3–4 place

Pos	Team	Pld	W	D	L	GF	GA	GD	Pts
3	Sânsimion	2	1	1	0	8	5	+3	39
4	Minerul Bălan	2	0	1	1	5	8	−3	34

Rules for classification: 1) Points; 2) Head-to-head points; 3) Head-to-head goal difference; 4) Head-to-head goals scored; 5) Head-to-head away goals scored; 6) Goal difference; 7) Goals scored.

=== Hunedoara County ===
The Liga IV Hunedoara County was played in a double round-robin regular season, followed by a Final Four stage for the top teams and a play-out for the remaining teams. The Final Four stage was contested in a double round-robin format, while the play-out was contested in a single round-robin format, with each team starting both stages with half of their regular season points, rounded up, with no other records carried over.

Team changes from the previous season

- Retezatul Hațeg achieved promotion to Liga III.
- Zarandu Crișcior (winners) declined promotion from Liga V Hunedoara.
- Viitorul Minerul Lupeni and Viitorul Șoimuș were admitted upon request.
- CS Hunedoara II was renamed as Corvinul Hunedoara II.

Pos	Team	Pld	W	D	L	GF	GA	GD	Pts	Qualification
1	Viitorul Minerul Lupeni	20	16	2	2	65	16	+49	50	Qualification to final four
2	Gloria Geoagiu	20	15	3	2	68	19	+49	48	Qualification to final four
3	Dacia Orăștie	20	13	2	5	53	32	+21	41	Qualification to final four
4	Corvinul Hunedoara II	20	10	5	5	51	36	+15	35	Qualification to final four
5	Șoimul Băița	20	10	3	7	44	29	+15	33	Qualification to championship play-out
6	Inter Petrila	20	8	5	7	33	38	−5	29	Qualification to championship play-out
7	Deva II	20	8	2	10	38	33	+5	26	Qualification to championship play-out
8	Mihai Viteazu Vulcan	20	3	6	11	22	53	−31	15	Qualification to championship play-out
9	Minerul Uricani	20	3	4	13	29	59	−30	13	Qualification to championship play-out
10	Victoria Călan	20	3	4	13	21	60	−39	13	Qualification to championship play-out
11	Viitorul Șoimuș	20	1	4	15	15	64	−49	7	Qualification to championship play-out

Rules for classification: 1) Points; 2) Head-to-head points; 3) Head-to-head goal difference; 4) Head-to-head goals scored; 5) Head-to-head away goals scored; 6) Goal difference; 7) Goals scored.

Championship play-off
Final four

Pos	Team	Pld	W	D	L	GF	GA	GD	Pts	Qualification
1	Gloria Geoagiu (C, Q)	6	6	0	0	21	2	+19	42	Qualification to promotion play-off
2	Viitorul Minerul Lupeni	6	4	0	2	14	8	+6	37	
3	Dacia Orăștie	6	1	0	5	6	21	−15	24	
4	Corvinul Hunedoara II	6	1	0	5	8	18	−10	21	

Rules for classification: 1) Points; 2) Head-to-head points; 3) Head-to-head goal difference; 4) Head-to-head goals scored; 5) Head-to-head away goals scored; 6) Goal difference; 7) Goals scored.
(C) Champions; (Q) Qualified for the phase indicated

Championship play-out

Pos	Team	Pld	W	D	L	GF	GA	GD	Pts	Relegation
5	Șoimul Băița	6	4	1	1	18	12	+6	30	
6	Inter Petrila	6	4	2	0	15	3	+12	29	
7	Deva II	6	3	0	3	14	13	+1	22	
8	Minerul Uricani	6	3	0	3	13	13	0	16	
9	Victoria Călan	6	2	0	4	12	13	−1	13	
10	Mihai Viteazu Vulcan	6	1	1	4	8	17	−9	12	
11	Viitorul Șoimuș (R)	6	2	0	4	9	18	−9	10	Relegation to Liga V Hunedoara

Rules for classification: 1) Points; 2) Head-to-head points; 3) Head-to-head goal difference; 4) Head-to-head goals scored; 5) Head-to-head away goals scored; 6) Goal difference; 7) Goals scored.
(R) Relegated

=== Ialomița County ===
The Liga IV Ialomița County was played over two series in a double round-robin format, with the top four teams from each series advancing to the play-off and the others entering the play-out, both contested in a single round-robin format, with teams starting both stages with their points halved and rounded up.

Team changes from the previous season

- CS Amara achieved promotion to Liga III.
- CSM Fetești was relegated from Liga III.
- Albești 08 (Series I winners) Real Cosâmbești (Series I runners-up) and Secunda Adâncata (Series II winners) were promoted from Liga V Ialomița.
- Progresul Sfântu Gheorghe (16th place; withdrew) was relegated to Liga V Ialomița.
- FC Dridu (Series II runners-up) declined promotion from Liga V Ialomița.
- Recolta Gheorghe Lazăr (15th place) was spared from relegation.
- AS Căzănești and AS Coșereni were admitted upon request

East Series

Pos	Team	Pld	W	D	L	GF	GA	GD	Pts	Qualification
1	Bărăganul Ciulnița	18	16	0	2	80	21	+59	48	Qualification to championship play-off
2	Fetești	18	12	2	4	62	26	+36	38	Qualification to championship play-off
3	Abatorul Slobozia	18	12	0	6	59	49	+10	36	Qualification to championship play-off
4	Victoria Țăndărei	18	10	4	4	64	37	+27	34	Qualification to championship play-off
5	Iazu	18	10	2	6	52	41	+11	32	Qualification to championship play-out
6	Unirea Scânteia	18	7	4	7	38	36	+2	25	Qualification to championship play-out
7	Albești 08	18	7	3	8	37	41	−4	24	Qualification to championship play-out
8	Real Cosâmbești	18	3	1	14	23	45	−22	10	Qualification to championship play-out
9	Recolta Gheorghe Lazăr	18	3	1	14	17	47	−30	10	Qualification to championship play-out
10	Căzănești	18	1	1	16	7	96	−89	4	Qualification to championship play-out

Rules for classification: 1) Points; 2) Head-to-head points; 3) Head-to-head goal difference; 4) Head-to-head goals scored; 5) Head-to-head away goals scored; 6) Goal difference; 7) Goals scored.

West Series

Pos	Team	Pld	W	D	L	GF	GA	GD	Pts	Qualification
1	Rovine	18	15	3	0	68	19	+49	48	Qualification to championship play-off
2	Unirea Ion Roată	18	13	0	5	60	27	+33	39	Qualification to championship play-off
3	Înfrățirea Jilavele	18	10	2	6	47	35	+12	32	Qualification to championship play-off
4	Victoria Munteni-Buzău	18	10	2	6	37	38	−1	32	Qualification to championship play-off
5	Urziceni	18	9	1	8	37	29	+8	28	Qualification to championship play-out
6	Recolta Bărcănești	18	7	2	9	38	42	−4	23	Qualification to championship play-out
7	Secunda Adâncata	18	7	2	9	30	47	−17	23	Qualification to championship play-out
8	Victoria Roșiori	18	5	2	11	30	47	−17	17	Qualification to championship play-out
9	Viitorul Axintele	18	4	2	12	26	40	−14	14	Qualification to championship play-out
10	Coșereni	18	2	0	16	18	67	−49	6	Qualification to championship play-out

Rules for classification: 1) Points; 2) Head-to-head points; 3) Head-to-head goal difference; 4) Head-to-head goals scored; 5) Head-to-head away goals scored; 6) Goal difference; 7) Goals scored.

Championship play-off

Pos	Team	Pld	W	D	L	GF	GA	GD	Pts	Qualification
1	Bărăganul Ciulnița (C, Q)	7	6	0	1	29	10	+19	42	Qualification to promotion play-off
2	Fetești	7	5	1	1	25	9	+16	35	
3	Unirea Ion Roată	7	4	1	2	17	14	+3	33	
4	Rovine	7	2	2	3	10	20	−10	32	
5	Victoria Țăndărei	7	2	1	4	14	25	−11	24	
6	Înfrățirea Jilavele	7	2	1	4	15	17	−2	23	
7	Victoria Munteni-Buzău	7	1	3	3	11	16	−5	22	
8	Abatorul Slobozia	7	1	1	5	18	28	−10	22	

Rules for classification: 1) Points; 2) Head-to-head points; 3) Head-to-head goal difference; 4) Head-to-head goals scored; 5) Head-to-head away goals scored; 6) Goal difference; 7) Goals scored.
(C) Champions; (Q) Qualified for the phase indicated

Championship play-out

Pos	Team	Pld	W	D	L	GF	GA	GD	Pts	Relegation
9	Urziceni	11	8	1	2	27	9	+18	39	
10	Recolta Bărcănești	11	7	1	3	48	19	+29	34	
11	Iazu	11	5	2	4	25	26	−1	33	
12	Viitorul Axintele	11	8	1	2	38	14	+24	32	
13	Unirea Scânteia	11	4	3	4	23	20	+3	28	
14	Secunda Adâncata	11	5	0	6	29	31	−2	27	
15	Victoria Roșiori	11	4	4	3	24	26	−2	25	
16	Albești 08	11	3	3	5	20	30	−10	24	
17	Real Cosâmbești	11	4	4	3	22	19	+3	21	
18	Recolta Gheorghe Lazăr (R)	11	3	4	4	22	28	−6	18	Relegation to Liga V Ialomița
19	Coșereni (R)	11	3	0	8	15	32	−17	12	Relegation to Liga V Ialomița
20	Căzănești (R)	11	0	1	10	6	45	−39	3	Relegation to Liga V Ialomița

Rules for classification: 1) Points; 2) Head-to-head points; 3) Head-to-head goal difference; 4) Head-to-head goals scored; 5) Head-to-head away goals scored; 6) Goal difference; 7) Goals scored.
(R) Relegated

=== Iași County ===
Team changes from the previous season

- CSM Pașcani was relegated from Liga III.
- Stejarul Dobrovăț (Series I winners), Com-Val Valea Lupului (Series II runners-up), Zimbru Boureni (Series III winners) and Spicul Heleșteni (Series III runners-up) were promoted from Liga V Iași.
- Voința Bivolari (Series II winners) and Fulgerul Țibănești (Series I runners-up) declined promotion from Liga V Iași.
- Biruința Miroslovești (12th place; withdrew) was relegated to Liga V Iași.
- Flacăra Erbiceni and Victoria Lețcani withdrew.
- USV Iași was admitted upon request.

Pos	Team	Pld	W	D	L	GF	GA	GD	Pts	Qualification or relegation
1	Moldova Cristești (C, Q)	30	27	3	0	138	27	+111	84	Qualification to promotion play-off
2	USV Iași	30	26	2	2	143	21	+122	80	
3	Stejarul Dobrovăț	30	21	2	7	99	50	+49	65	
4	Pașcani	30	19	3	8	87	40	+47	60	
5	Unirea Scânteia	30	14	4	12	83	74	+9	46	
6	Țuțora	30	13	6	11	70	63	+7	45	
7	Unirea Ruginoasa	30	13	4	13	70	59	+11	43	
8	Gloria Bălțați	30	12	6	12	53	57	−4	42	
9	Stejarul Bârnova	30	11	9	10	62	74	−12	42	
10	Com-Val Valea Lupului	30	13	2	15	48	68	−20	41	
11	Zimbru Boureni	30	11	5	14	68	71	−3	38	
12	Viitorul Hârlau	30	10	4	16	51	70	−19	34	
13	Stejarul Sinești	30	8	4	18	53	82	−29	28	
14	Tomești	30	7	2	21	42	127	−85	23	
15	Progresul Deleni (R)	30	4	0	26	15	112	−97	12	Relegation to Liga V Iași
16	Spicul Heleșteni (R)	30	3	0	27	33	120	−87	9	Relegation to Liga V Iași

Rules for classification: 1) Points; 2) Head-to-head points; 3) Head-to-head goal difference; 4) Head-to-head goals scored; 5) Head-to-head away goals scored; 6) Goal difference; 7) Goals scored.
(C) Champions; (Q) Qualified for the phase indicated; (R) Relegated

=== Ilfov County ===
Team changes from the previous season

- Viitorul Vidra (runners-up) was promoted from Liga V Ilfov.
- AXI Arena București (winners) declined promotion from Liga V Ilfov.
- Star Team Buftea (Series I 9th place), ACS Corbeanca (Series I 10th place) and CS Berceni (Series II 9th place) were relegated to Liga V Ilfov.
- Voința 2018 Crevedia, Speranța Săbăreni, ACS Periș and ACS Dărvari withdrew.
- Viitorul Petrăchioaia (Series II 10th place) was spared from relegation.
- Olimpic Snagov, CS Tunari II, Stejarul Gruiu, CS Balotești, LPS HD Clinceni, FC 1 Decembrie and Viitorul Domnești were admitted upon request.

Series I

Pos	Team	Pld	W	D	L	GF	GA	GD	Pts	Qualification or relegation
1	Ștefănești (Q)	18	13	5	0	61	13	+48	44	Qualification to championship play-off
2	Olimpic Snagov (Q)	18	11	4	3	61	26	+35	37	Qualification to championship play-off
3	Viitorul Dragomirești-Vale	18	11	3	4	55	26	+29	36	
4	Tunari II	18	11	2	5	42	30	+12	35	
5	Ciorogârla	18	9	1	8	40	34	+6	28	
6	Stejarul Gruiu	18	8	3	7	37	28	+9	27	
7	Voința Domnești	18	7	6	5	33	25	+8	27	
8	Voința Buftea	18	5	0	13	39	71	−32	15	
9	ARD Snagov	18	3	0	15	27	74	−47	9	
10	Balotești (Note: Balotești withdrew after 9 rounds and lost all remaining matches with 0–3.)	18	0	0	18	8	76	−68	0	

Rules for classification: 1) Points; 2) Head-to-head points; 3) Head-to-head goal difference; 4) Head-to-head goals scored; 5) Head-to-head away goals scored; 6) Goal difference; 7) Goals scored.
(Q) Qualified for the phase indicated
Notes:

Series II

Pos	Team	Pld	W	D	L	GF	GA	GD	Pts	Qualification or relegation
1	LPS HD Clinceni (Q)	20	18	0	2	90	12	+78	54	Qualification to championship play-off
2	Brănești (Q)	20	16	0	4	52	22	+30	48	Qualification to championship play-off
3	Bragadiru (Note: Bragadiru excluded after 18 rounds and lost all remaining matches with 0–3.)	20	12	1	7	54	31	+23	37	
4	Glina	20	11	1	8	41	33	+8	34	
5	Juniors Berceni	20	10	1	9	42	41	+1	31	
6	1 Decembrie	20	8	1	11	41	56	−15	25	
7	Măgurele	20	7	3	10	27	37	−10	24	
8	Viitorul Vidra	20	7	3	10	41	67	−26	24	
9	Viitorul Pantelimon	20	7	2	11	38	53	−15	23	
10	Viitorul Petrăchioaia	20	5	0	15	36	67	−31	15	
11	Viitorul Domnești (Note: Viitorul Domnești withdrew after 12 rounds and lost all remaining matches with 0–3.)	20	2	2	16	19	62	−43	8	

Rules for classification: 1) Points; 2) Head-to-head points; 3) Head-to-head goal difference; 4) Head-to-head goals scored; 5) Head-to-head away goals scored; 6) Goal difference; 7) Goals scored.
(Q) Qualified for the phase indicated
Notes:

Championship play-off
Semi-finals

The championship semi-finals was played in a double-leg format on 20 and 27 May 2023.

Team 1	Agg.	Team 2	1st leg	2nd leg
Ștefănești	9–1	Brănești	4–0	5–1
LPS HD Clinceni	7–2	Olimpic Snagov	3–0	4–2

Final

The championship final was played in a double-leg format on 4 and 10 June 2023.

Team 1	Agg.	Team 2	1st leg	2nd leg
Ștefănești	1–4	LPS HD Clinceni	0–0	1–4

LPS HD Clinceni won the Liga IV Ilfov and qualified for the promotion play-off in Liga III.

=== Maramureș County ===
Team changes from the previous season

- CSM Sighetu Marmației achieved promotion to Liga III.
- Progresul Șomcuta Mare was relegated from Liga III.
- Dinamic Groși (Series I winners) and PHP Iadăra (Series II winners) declined promotion from Liga V Maramureș.
- FC Suciu de Sus, Rapid Satu Nou de Sus, CSO Borșa, Metalul Bogdan Vodă withdrew.
- Plimob Sighetu Marmației, Academica Recea and Luceafărul Strâmtura were admitted upon request.

South Series

Pos	Team	Pld	W	D	L	GF	GA	GD	Pts	Qualification or relegation
1	Academica Recea (Q)	22	21	0	1	119	4	+115	63	Qualification to final four
2	Gloria Tăuții-Măgherăuș (Q)	22	17	3	2	91	29	+62	54	Qualification to final four
3	Progresul Șomcuta Mare	22	15	2	5	77	45	+32	47	
4	Lăpușul Târgu Lăpuș	22	14	4	4	77	31	+46	46	
5	Lăpuș R	22	12	2	8	50	59	−9	38	
6	Minerul Baia Sprie	22	10	2	10	62	52	+10	32	
7	Fărcașa	22	10	2	10	49	51	−2	32	
8	Bradul Groșii Țibleșului	22	8	2	12	38	68	−30	26	
9	Unirea Șișești	22	8	1	13	47	59	−12	25	
10	Seini (Note: Seini and Viitorul Ulmeni withdrew after 11 rounds and lost all remaining matches with 0–3.)	21	3	0	18	17	60	−43	9	
11	Viitorul Ulmeni	21	2	0	19	21	100	−79	6	
12	Carmen Satulung	22	2	0	20	19	109	−90	6	

Rules for classification: 1) Points; 2) Head-to-head points; 3) Head-to-head goal difference; 4) Head-to-head goals scored; 5) Head-to-head away goals scored; 6) Goal difference; 7) Goals scored.
(Q) Qualified for the phase indicated
Notes:

North Series

Pos	Team	Pld	W	D	L	GF	GA	GD	Pts	Qualification or relegation
1	Avântul Bârsana (Q)	16	13	1	2	63	21	+42	40	Qualification to final four
2	Zorile Moisei (Q)	16	11	3	2	45	17	+28	36	Qualification to final four
3	Luceafărul Strâmtura	16	7	6	3	28	19	+9	27	
4	Plimob Sighetu Marmației	16	8	1	7	40	28	+12	25	
5	Recolta Săliștea de Sus	16	6	4	6	24	39	−15	22	
6	Bradul Vișeu de Sus	16	5	2	9	23	34	−11	17	
7	Salina Ocna Șugatag	16	4	4	8	27	37	−10	16	
8	Remeți	16	5	2	9	30	36	−6	17	
9	Iza Dragomirești	16	0	3	13	18	67	−49	3	

Rules for classification: 1) Points; 2) Head-to-head points; 3) Head-to-head goal difference; 4) Head-to-head goals scored; 5) Head-to-head away goals scored; 6) Goal difference; 7) Goals scored.
(Q) Qualified for the phase indicated

Final four
Semi-finals

The first legs was played on 28 May, and the second legs was played on 2 and 3 June 2023.

Team 1	Agg.	Team 2	1st leg	2nd leg
Zorile Moisei	0–11	Academica Recea	0–0	0–11
Gloria Tăuții-Măgherăuș	3–6	Avântul Bârsana	2–0	1–6

Final

The championship final was played on 11 June 2023 at Viorel Mateianu Stadium in Baia Mare.

Team 1	Score	Team 2
Academica Recea	1–0	Avântul Bârsana

Academica Recea won the Liga IV Maramureș County and qualified for the promotion play-off in Liga III.

=== Mehedinți County ===
The Liga IV Mehedinți County was played in a single round-robin regular season featuring fourteen teams, followed by a championship play-off for the top six teams, played in a double round-robin format, and a championship play-out for teams ranked 7th to 14th, played in a single round-robin format, with teams carrying over their points from the regular season.

Team changes from the previous season

- Viitorul Bistrița (winners) declined promotion from Liga V Mehedinți.
- Viitorul Corcova, and Viitorul Corcova withdrew.
- Victoria Strehaia, CSL Gogoșu, Academia Flavius Stoican and Coșuștea Căzănești were admitted upon request.

Pos	Team	Pld	W	D	L	GF	GA	GD	Pts	Qualification
1	Recolta Dănceu	13	11	2	0	64	7	+57	35	Qualification to championship play-off
2	Pandurii Cerneți	13	10	3	0	42	16	+26	33	Qualification to championship play-off
3	Turnu Severin	13	9	2	2	38	14	+24	29	Qualification to championship play-off
4	Viitorul Cujmir	13	9	0	4	50	22	+28	27	Qualification to championship play-off
5	Victoria Vânju Mare	13	9	0	4	35	19	+16	27	Qualification to championship play-off
6	Viitorul Severin	13	8	1	4	52	19	+33	25	Qualification to championship play-off
7	Real Vânători	13	7	0	6	23	35	−12	21	Qualification to championship play-out
8	Obârșia de Câmp	13	6	1	6	22	19	+3	19	Qualification to championship play-out
9	Noapteșa	13	5	1	7	38	41	−3	16	Qualification to championship play-out
10	Victoria Strehaia	13	4	0	9	18	36	−18	12	Qualification to championship play-out
11	Gogoșu	13	3	1	9	16	46	−30	10	Qualification to championship play-out
12	Academia Flavius Stoican	13	3	0	10	17	46	−29	9	Qualification to championship play-out
13	Coșuștea Căzănești	13	1	1	11	16	64	−48	4	Qualification to championship play-out
14	Inter Salcia	13	0	0	13	16	63	−47	0	Qualification to championship play-out

Rules for classification: 1) Points; 2) Head-to-head points; 3) Head-to-head goal difference; 4) Head-to-head goals scored; 5) Head-to-head away goals scored; 6) Goal difference; 7) Goals scored.

Championship play-off

Pos	Team	Pld	W	D	L	GF	GA	GD	Pts	Qualification
1	Recolta Dănceu (C, Q)	10	7	1	2	33	15	+18	57	Qualification to promotion play-off
2	Turnu Severin	10	7	1	2	18	7	+11	51	
3	Pandurii Cerneți	10	4	2	4	19	28	−9	47	
4	Victoria Vânju Mare	10	5	2	3	20	14	+6	44	
5	Viitorul Severin	10	3	0	7	13	18	−5	34	
6	Viitorul Cujmir	10	0	2	8	10	31	−21	29	

Rules for classification: 1) Points; 2) Head-to-head points; 3) Head-to-head goal difference; 4) Head-to-head goals scored; 5) Head-to-head away goals scored; 6) Goal difference; 7) Goals scored.
(C) Champions; (Q) Qualified for the phase indicated

Championship play-out

Pos	Team	Pld	W	D	L	GF	GA	GD	Pts
7	Obârșia de Câmp	7	4	1	2	20	13	+7	32
8	Gogoșu	7	6	1	0	31	5	+26	29
9	Victoria Strehaia	7	5	1	1	17	9	+8	28
10	Noapteșa	7	2	1	4	22	21	+1	23
11	Real Vânători (Note: Real Vânători withdrew before the start of the play-out and lost all matches with 0–3.)	7	0	0	7	0	21	−21	21
12	Coșuștea Căzănești	7	3	2	2	21	13	+8	15
13	Inter Salcia	7	4	0	3	21	16	+5	12
14	Academia Flavius Stoican	7	1	0	6	8	42	−34	12

Rules for classification: 1) Points; 2) Head-to-head points; 3) Head-to-head goal difference; 4) Head-to-head goals scored; 5) Head-to-head away goals scored; 6) Goal difference; 7) Goals scored.

=== Mureș County ===
Team changes from the previous season

- MSE 1898 Târgu Mureș achieved promotion to Liga III.
- Unirea Ungheni II (18th place, withdrew) was relegated to Liga V Mureș.
- Kinder Sângeorgiu de Mureș, Mureșul Chirileu, Inter Sânger and Viitorul Târnăveni withdrew.
- CSM Sighișoara and Gaz Metan Daneș were admitted upon request.
- Înfrățirea Valea Izvoarelor was renamed Búzásbesenyő Valea Izvoarelor.

Pos	Team	Pld	W	D	L	GF	GA	GD	Pts	Qualification or relegation
1	Iernut (C, Q)	26	23	3	0	107	25	+82	72	Qualification to promotion play-off
2	ASA Târgu Mureș	26	21	4	1	93	27	+66	67	
3	Academica Transilvania Târgu Mureș	26	16	5	5	82	43	+39	53	
4	Atletic Târgu Mureș	26	14	4	8	71	50	+21	46	
5	Mureșul Rușii-Munți	26	12	4	10	62	49	+13	40	
6	Mureșul Luduș	26	10	5	11	60	53	+7	35	
7	Târnava Mică Sângeorgiu de Pădure	26	11	2	13	48	50	−2	35	
8	Câmpia Râciu	26	11	2	13	50	65	−15	35	
9	Sovata	26	11	2	13	50	72	−22	35	
10	Búzásbesenyő Valea Izvoarelor	26	8	4	14	65	79	−14	28	
11	Gaz Metan Daneș	26	8	3	15	56	78	−22	27	
12	Miercurea Nirajului	26	8	2	16	46	68	−22	26	
13	Sighișoara	26	4	3	19	33	92	−59	15	
14	Rază de Soare Acățari (Note: Rază de Soare Acățari withdrew and lost all matches from second part of the season with 0–3.)	26	2	3	21	13	85	−72	9	

Rules for classification: 1) Points; 2) Head-to-head points; 3) Head-to-head goal difference; 4) Head-to-head goals scored; 5) Head-to-head away goals scored; 6) Goal difference; 7) Goals scored.
(C) Champions; (Q) Qualified for the phase indicated

=== Neamț County ===
Team changes from the previous season

- Speranța Răucești declined promotion to Liga III.
- Energia Pângărați withdrew.
- Teiul Poiana Teiului, Unirea Tămășeni, AS Grumăzești, Biruința Gherăești, Viitorul Borca, Siretul Doljești, and Voința Dochia were admitted upon request.

Pos	Team	Pld	W	D	L	GF	GA	GD	Pts	Qualification or relegation
1	Victoria Horia (C, Q)	30	27	1	2	119	18	+101	82	Qualification to promotion play-off
2	Speranța Răucești	30	25	2	3	119	30	+89	77	
3	Roman	30	22	4	4	131	28	+103	70	
4	Voința Ion Creangă	30	20	4	6	100	40	+60	64	
5	Unirea Trifești	30	18	4	8	94	39	+55	58	
6	Ozana Timișești	30	16	5	9	108	61	+47	53	
7	Viitorul Podoleni	30	13	3	14	67	76	−9	42	
8	Teiul Poiana Teiului	30	13	2	15	81	91	−10	41	
9	Unirea Tămășeni	30	12	3	15	61	70	−9	39	
10	Vulturul Costișa	30	11	5	14	42	64	−22	38	
11	Grumăzești	30	10	5	15	49	69	−20	35	
12	Voința Dochia	30	11	1	18	59	105	−46	34	
13	Girov	30	5	5	20	61	108	−47	20	
14	Siretul Doljești	30	6	2	22	38	125	−87	20	
15	Biruința Gherăești	30	4	1	25	49	132	−83	13	
16	Viitorul Borca	30	1	5	24	28	150	−122	8	

Rules for classification: 1) Points; 2) Head-to-head points; 3) Head-to-head goal difference; 4) Head-to-head goals scored; 5) Head-to-head away goals scored; 6) Goal difference; 7) Goals scored.
(C) Champions; (Q) Qualified for the phase indicated

=== Olt County ===
Team changes from the previous season

- Victoria Dăneasa (13th place) and Voința Băbiciu (14th place) were relegated to Liga V Olt.
- Lupii Profa (Series I winners), AS Voineasa (Series II winners), and Oltul Tia Mare (Series III winners) declined promotion from Liga V Olt.
- Viitorul Grădinile withdrew.
- Viitorul Știința Draganești-Olt, Iris Nicolae Titulescu, Unirea Pârșcoveni, Valea Oltului Ipotești, and Energia Viitorul Strejești were admitted upon request.

Pos	Team	Pld	W	D	L	GF	GA	GD	Pts	Qualification or relegation
1	Oltul Curtișoara (C, Q)	30	28	0	2	134	21	+113	84	Qualification to promotion play-off
2	Caracal	30	27	0	3	102	26	+76	81	
3	Unirea Radomirești	30	21	3	6	79	39	+40	66	
4	Știința Mărunței	30	17	6	7	88	51	+37	57	
5	Viitorul Coteana	30	17	4	9	82	56	+26	55	
6	Viitorul Știința Draganești-Olt	30	17	3	10	81	47	+34	54	
7	Oltul Slătioara	30	16	5	9	72	41	+31	53	
8	Iris Nicolae Titulescu	30	15	2	13	69	57	+12	47	
9	Valea Oltului Ipotești	30	12	2	16	66	79	−13	38	
10	Olt Scornicești	30	10	5	15	64	69	−5	35	
11	Viitorul Osica de Jos	30	11	1	18	49	80	−31	34	
12	Unirea Pârșcoveni	30	8	4	18	50	74	−24	28	
13	Energia Viitorul Strejești	30	6	5	19	59	86	−27	23	
14	Viitorul Rusănești	30	7	1	22	51	132	−81	22	
15	Oltețul Osica	30	4	0	26	28	120	−92	12	
16	Voința Schitu	30	3	1	26	17	113	−96	10	

Rules for classification: 1) Points; 2) Head-to-head points; 3) Head-to-head goal difference; 4) Head-to-head goals scored; 5) Head-to-head away goals scored; 6) Goal difference; 7) Goals scored.
(C) Champions; (Q) Qualified for the phase indicated

=== Prahova County ===
Team changes from the previous season

- CS Păulești achieved promotion to Liga III.
- Tinerețea Izvoarele (18th place) was relegated to Liga V Prahova
- Triumf Poiana Câmpina (winners) and CS Câmpina (runners-up) were promoted from Liga V Prahova.
- CSC Măneciu was renamed Avântul Măneciu.
- Petrolistul Boldești was renamed CSO Boldești-Scăeni.

Pos	Team	Pld	W	D	L	GF	GA	GD	Pts	Qualification or relegation
1	Tricolorul Breaza (C, Q)	34	30	2	2	129	20	+109	92	Qualification to promotion play-off
2	Câmpina	34	25	3	6	109	35	+74	78	
3	Petrolul 95 Ploiești	34	24	4	6	106	36	+70	76	
4	Cornu	34	24	3	7	95	31	+64	75	
5	Băicoi	34	23	4	7	99	34	+65	73	
6	Boldești-Scăeni	34	19	6	9	92	43	+49	63	
7	Mănești	34	17	5	12	92	65	+27	56	
8	Brebu	34	17	5	12	67	49	+18	56	
9	Atletic United 1906 Ploiești	34	14	5	15	48	58	−10	47	
10	Teleajenul Vălenii de Munte	34	14	4	16	74	72	+2	46	
11	Avântul Măneciu	34	14	2	18	55	58	−3	44	
12	Voința Vărbilău	34	13	4	17	52	69	−17	43	
13	Triumf Poiana Câmpina	34	12	4	18	55	78	−23	40	
14	Brazi	34	9	6	19	43	98	−55	33	
15	Unirea Urlați	34	7	8	19	36	67	−31	29	
16	Bănești-Urleta	34	7	3	24	37	95	−58	24	
17	Berceni (Note: Berceni was spared from relegation due to the promotion of Tricolorul Breaza in Liga III.)	34	2	2	30	31	138	−107	8	Spared from relegation
18	Strejnic (R)	34	0	0	34	14	188	−174	0	Relegation to Liga V Prahova

Rules for classification: 1) Points; 2) Head-to-head points; 3) Head-to-head goal difference; 4) Head-to-head goals scored; 5) Head-to-head away goals scored; 6) Goal difference; 7) Goals scored.
(C) Champions; (Q) Qualified for the phase indicated; (R) Relegated

=== Satu Mare County ===
The Liga IV Satu Mare County was played in a double round-robin regular season featuring sixteen teams split into two series, with the top four from each series qualifying for the championship play-off and the bottom four for the play-out. The play-off was played in a double round-robin format, with teams starting with bonus points based on their regular-season positions: 1st place – 3 points, 2nd place – 2 points, 3rd place – 1 point, and 4th place – 0 points, while the play-out was played in a single round-robin format, with teams starting with bonus points based on their regular-season positions: 5th place – 3 points, 6th place – 2 points, 7th place – 1 point, and 8th place – 0 points.

Team changes from the previous season

- Victoria Carei achieved promotion to Liga III.
- Recolta Sanislău (16th place) was relegated to Liga V Satu Mare.
- Voința Turț (Series A winners) and Sportul Botiz (Series B winners) were promoted from Liga V Satu Mare.
- Energia Negrești-Oaș was renamed Oașul 1969 Negrești-Oaș.

Series A

Pos	Team	Pld	W	D	L	GF	GA	GD	Pts	Qualification
1	Oașul 1969 Negrești-Oaș	14	12	0	2	59	8	+51	36	Qualification to championship play-off
2	Recolta Dorolț	14	11	1	2	37	14	+23	34	Qualification to championship play-off
3	Talna Orașu Nou	14	10	2	2	46	15	+31	32	Qualification to championship play-off
4	Sportul Botiz	14	7	2	5	34	31	+3	23	Qualification to championship play-off
5	Știința Beltiug	14	7	0	7	33	31	+2	21	Qualification to relegation play-out
6	Turul Micula	14	3	1	10	18	48	−30	10	Qualification to relegation play-out
7	Voința Turț	14	2	0	12	19	52	−33	6	Qualification to relegation play-out
8	Unirea Păulești (Note: Unirea Păulești withdrew after 10 rounds and lost all remaining matches with 0–3.)	14	1	0	13	9	56	−47	3	Qualification to relegation play-out

Rules for classification: 1) Points; 2) Head-to-head points; 3) Head-to-head goal difference; 4) Head-to-head goals scored; 5) Head-to-head away goals scored; 6) Goal difference; 7) Goals scored.
Notes:

Series B

Pos	Team	Pld	W	D	L	GF	GA	GD	Pts	Qualification
1	Olimpia MCMXXI Satu Mare	14	12	2	0	73	3	+70	38	Qualification to championship play-off
2	Unirea Tășnad	14	12	2	0	56	10	+46	38	Qualification to championship play-off
3	Viitorul Vetiș (Note: Viitorul Vetiș and Luceafărul Decebal withdrew after 10 rounds and lost all remaining matches with 0–3.) (D)	14	8	0	6	41	23	+18	24	Withdrew
4	Schwaben Kalmandi Cămin (Note: Schwaben Kalmandi Cămin withdrew from the championship play-off and will play in the championship play-out.)	14	5	1	8	24	38	−14	16	Qualification to relegation play-out
5	Luceafărul Decebal (D)	14	4	1	9	21	44	−23	13	Qualification to relegation play-out
6	Căpleni	14	3	4	7	19	53	−34	13	Qualification to relegation play-out
7	Stăruința Berveni	14	3	2	9	12	46	−34	11	Qualification to relegation play-out
8	Fortuna Căpleni	14	2	2	10	17	46	−29	8	Qualification to relegation play-out

Rules for classification: 1) Points; 2) Head-to-head points; 3) Head-to-head goal difference; 4) Head-to-head goals scored; 5) Head-to-head away goals scored; 6) Goal difference; 7) Goals scored.
(D) Disqualified
Notes:

Championship play-off

Pos	Team	Pld	W	D	L	GF	GA	GD	Pts	Qualification
1	Olimpia MCMXXI Satu Mare (C, Q)	10	9	0	1	36	11	+25	30	Qualification to promotion play-off
2	Oașul 1969 Negrești-Oaș	10	5	1	4	23	17	+6	19	
3	Unirea Tășnad	10	5	1	4	22	15	+7	18	
4	Sportul Botiz	10	5	0	5	19	26	−7	15	
5	Recolta Dorolț	10	4	0	6	16	19	−3	14	
6	Talna Orașu Nou	10	1	0	9	14	42	−28	4	

Rules for classification: 1) Points; 2) Head-to-head points; 3) Head-to-head goal difference; 4) Head-to-head goals scored; 5) Head-to-head away goals scored; 6) Goal difference; 7) Goals scored.
(C) Champions; (Q) Qualified for the phase indicated

Relegation play-out

Pos	Team	Pld	W	D	L	GF	GA	GD	Pts	Qualification or relegation
7	Știința Beltiug	6	6	0	0	22	3	+19	21	
8	Căpleni	5	3	0	2	14	12	+2	11	
9	Stăruința Berveni	5	2	1	2	14	21	−7	8	
10	Schwaben Kalmandi Cămin	6	1	2	3	7	15	−8	8	
11	Turul Micula	4	1	1	2	13	11	+2	6	
12	Fortuna Căpleni	6	2	0	4	10	14	−4	6	
13	Voința Turț (R)	4	1	0	3	6	10	−4	4	Relegation to Liga V Satu Mare
14	Viitorul Vetiș (Note: Viitorul Vetiș, Unirea Păulești, and Luceafărul Decebal withdrew after 10 rounds of the regular season.) (D)	0	0	0	0	0	0	0	0	Withdrew
15	Luceafărul Decebal (D)	0	0	0	0	0	0	0	0	Withdrew
16	Unirea Păulești (D)	0	0	0	0	0	0	0	0	Withdrew

Rules for classification: 1) Points; 2) Head-to-head points; 3) Head-to-head goal difference; 4) Head-to-head goals scored; 5) Head-to-head away goals scored; 6) Goal difference; 7) Goals scored.
(D) Disqualified; (R) Relegated

=== Sălaj County ===
Team changes from the previous season

- Venus Giurtelec (11th place; withdrew) and Silvania Cehu Silvaniei (12th place; withdrew) were relegated to Liga V Sălaj.
- AS Creaca Jac (East Series winners) and Inter Cizer (West Series winners) were promoted from Liga V Sălaj.
- Sportul Șimleu Silvaniei II was admitted upon request.
- Rapid Jibou was renamed SCO Jibou.

Pos	Team	Pld	W	D	L	GF	GA	GD	Pts	Qualification or relegation
1	Luceafărul Bălan (C, Q)	24	19	3	2	83	33	+50	60	Qualification to promotion play-off
2	Barcău Nușfalău	24	18	2	4	71	37	+34	56	
3	Jibou	24	15	4	5	76	28	+48	49	
4	Ardealul Crișeni	24	15	3	6	86	36	+50	48	
5	Someșul Someș-Odorhei	24	12	5	7	68	49	+19	41	
6	Juniorii Ip	24	12	4	8	59	50	+9	40	
7	Chieșd	24	12	3	9	69	49	+20	39	
8	Inter Cizer	24	11	3	10	58	55	+3	36	
9	Creaca Jac	24	7	2	15	54	82	−28	23	
10	Bănișor-Peceiu	24	5	3	16	29	64	−35	18	
11	Cosniciu	24	4	3	17	35	61	−26	15	
12	Rapid Zimbor	24	3	5	16	35	67	−32	14	
13	Sportul Șimleu Silvaniei II (R)	24	2	2	20	29	141	−112	8	Relegation to Liga V Sălaj

Rules for classification: 1) Points; 2) Head-to-head points; 3) Head-to-head goal difference; 4) Head-to-head goals scored; 5) Head-to-head away goals scored; 6) Goal difference; 7) Goals scored.
(C) Champions; (Q) Qualified for the phase indicated; (R) Relegated

=== Sibiu County ===
Team changes from the previous season

- Măgura Cisnădie (14th place), Vulturul Poplaca (15th place) and ASA Sibiu (17th place) were relegated to Liga V Sibiu.
- Viitorul Ațel (Mediaș Series winners) and Recolta Apoldu de Jos (Sibiu Series winners) declined promotion from Liga V Sibiu.
- FC Tălmaciu and AFC Agnita were spared from relegation.
- ACS Mediaș took the place of Interstar Sibiu.

Pos	Team	Pld	W	D	L	GF	GA	GD	Pts	Qualification or relegation
1	Mediaș (C, Q)	26	26	0	0	168	18	+150	78	Qualification to promotion play-off
2	Inter Sibiu	26	23	1	2	176	16	+160	70	
3	Avrig	26	21	2	3	93	30	+63	65	
4	Păltiniș Rășinari	26	12	5	9	79	63	+16	41	
5	Dumbrăveni	26	12	4	10	65	54	+11	40	
6	Bradu	26	11	5	10	53	50	+3	38	
7	Unirea Miercurea Sibiului	26	11	5	10	48	62	−14	38	
8	Quantum/Cuantic Arsenal Sibiu	26	11	4	11	47	49	−2	37	
9	Sparta Mediaș	26	9	2	15	49	68	−19	29	
10	Leii Șura Mică	26	7	2	17	41	94	−53	23	
11	Tălmaciu	26	7	1	18	38	115	−77	22	
12	Agnita	26	5	6	15	33	100	−67	21	
13	Voința Sibiu (R)	26	5	4	17	37	78	−41	19	Relegation to Liga V Sibiu
14	Copșa Mică (R)	26	1	1	24	30	160	−130	4	Relegation to Liga V Sibiu

Rules for classification: 1) Points; 2) Head-to-head points; 3) Head-to-head goal difference; 4) Head-to-head goals scored; 5) Head-to-head away goals scored; 6) Goal difference; 7) Goals scored.
(C) Champions; (Q) Qualified for the phase indicated; (R) Relegated

=== Suceava County ===
Team changes from the previous season

- Sporting Poieni Solca (Series I winners), Academica Gălănești (Series II winners) and Dorna Vatra Dornei (Series III winners) were promoted from Liga V Suceava.
- Foresta Suceava II and Bucovina Dărmănești were admitted upon request.

Pos	Team	Pld	W	D	L	GF	GA	GD	Pts	Qualification or relegation
1	Viitorul Liteni (C, Q)	28	24	2	2	110	37	+73	74	Qualification to promotion play-off
2	Moldova Drăgușeni	28	18	3	7	76	37	+39	57	
3	Juniorul Suceava	28	16	8	4	92	26	+66	56	
4	Șomuzul Preutești	28	15	7	6	64	39	+25	52	
5	Bucovina Dărmănești	28	15	3	10	66	51	+15	48	
6	Progresul Frătăuții Vechi	28	14	6	8	63	52	+11	48	
7	Academica Gălănești	28	13	5	10	71	62	+9	44	
8	Foresta Suceava II	28	11	5	12	66	51	+15	38	
9	Victoria Vatra Moldoviței	28	10	8	10	44	54	−10	38	
10	ASA Rarău Câmpulung Moldovenesc	28	11	3	14	52	51	+1	36	
11	Recolta Fântânele	28	10	6	12	54	69	−15	36	
12	Siretul Dolhasca	28	9	3	16	46	67	−21	30	
13	Dorna Vatra Dornei (Note: Dorna Vatra Dornei withdrew after 20 rounds and lost all remaining matches with 0–3.) (R)	28	6	4	18	32	73	−41	22	Relegation to Liga V Suceava
14	Sporting Poieni Solca	28	5	3	20	50	133	−83	18	
15	Concordia Grămești (Note: Concordia Grămești withdrew after 9 rounds and lost all matches with 0–3.) (R)	28	0	0	28	0	84	−84	0	Relegation to Liga V Suceava

Rules for classification: 1) Points; 2) Head-to-head points; 3) Head-to-head goal difference; 4) Head-to-head goals scored; 5) Head-to-head away goals scored; 6) Goal difference; 7) Goals scored.
(C) Champions; (Q) Qualified for the phase indicated; (R) Relegated

=== Teleorman County ===
Team changes from the previous season

- Dunărea Turris Turnu Măgurele achieved promotion to Liga III.
- ASC Seaca (Series II runners-up and promotion play-off winners) (Note: ASC Seaca defeated Viitorul Săceni 1–0 and 1–1, the winner of Series I, in the promotion play-off.) was promoted from Liga V Teleorman
- Viitorul Butești (Series I, 8th place), Unirea Moșteni (Series I, 9th place), Sporting Roșiori II (Series II, 8th place) and Progresul Smirdioasa (Series II, 9th place) were relegated to Liga V Teleorman.
- CSM Alexandria II withdrew.
- Viitorul Piatra (Series II winners and promotion play-off winners) (Note: Viitorul Piatra defeated Tineretul Ciolănești 5–1 and 4–1, the runner-up of Series I, in the promotion play-off.) ceded its place to CSL Nanov.

Pos	Team	Pld	W	D	L	GF	GA	GD	Pts	Qualification or relegation
1	Rapid Buzescu (C, Q)	26	21	2	3	92	33	+59	65	Qualification to promotion play-off
2	Avântul Bragadiru	26	16	4	6	63	31	+32	52	
3	Astra Plosca	26	15	4	7	64	40	+24	49	
4	Voința Saelele 2017	26	14	4	8	68	52	+16	46	
5	Nanov	26	12	6	8	58	45	+13	42	
6	Steaua Spătărei	26	13	3	10	46	41	+5	42	
7	Metalul Peretu	26	13	2	11	58	45	+13	41	
8	Drăgănești-Vlașca	26	11	4	11	57	50	+7	37	
9	Dinamic Kids Videle	26	9	5	12	42	45	−3	32	
10	Seaca	26	7	6	13	49	70	−21	27	
11	Victoria Lunca	26	7	5	14	39	57	−18	26	
12	Vârtoape	26	8	0	18	57	82	−25	24	
13	Atletic Orbeasca (R)	26	7	2	17	33	95	−62	23	Qualification to relegation play-out
14	Ajax Botoroaga (Note: Ajax Botoroaga withdrew after 21 rounds and lost all matches from second part of the season with 0–3.) (R)	26	5	1	20	23	63	−40	16	Relegation to Liga V Teleorman

Rules for classification: 1) Points; 2) Head-to-head points; 3) Head-to-head goal difference; 4) Head-to-head goals scored; 5) Head-to-head away goals scored; 6) Goal difference; 7) Goals scored.
(C) Champions; (Q) Qualified for the phase indicated; (R) Relegated
Notes:

Relegation play-out

The 13th-placed team of Liga IV faced the 4th-placed team of Liga V – Teleorman County. The matches were played on 3 and 10 June 2023.

Team 1	Agg.	Team 2	1st leg	2nd leg
Viitorul Lunca	6–2	Atletic Orbeasca	5–0	1–2

=== Timiș County ===
Team changes from the previous season

- Phoenix Buziaș achieved promotion to Liga III.
- Unirea Grabaț (20th place) was relegated to Liga V Timiș.
- Unirea Jimbolia (Series I winners) and Gloria Moșnița Nouă (Series III winners) were promoted from Liga V Timiș.
- Juventus Pișchia (Series II winners) declined promotion from Liga V Timiș, and Steaua Roșie Variaș (Series II runners-up) was promoted instead.
- Fortuna Becicherecu Mic withdrew.
- ACS Sânandrei Carani was spared from relegation.
- Atletico Liebling was renamed CSC Liebling.

Pos	Team	Pld	W	D	L	GF	GA	GD	Pts	Qualification or relegation
1	Peciu Nou (C, Q)	36	30	5	1	116	27	+89	95	Qualification to promotion play-off
2	Lugoj	36	28	5	3	108	17	+91	89	
3	Sânandrei Carani	36	25	5	6	113	46	+67	80	
4	Millenium Giarmata	36	22	2	12	92	70	+22	68	
5	Timișul Șag	36	20	5	11	87	57	+30	65	
6	Voința Mașloc	36	18	6	12	84	61	+23	60	
7	Unirea Sânnicolau Mare	36	18	5	13	93	68	+25	59	
8	Deta	36	18	3	15	67	59	+8	57	
9	Liebling	36	17	6	13	59	65	−6	57	
10	Comloșu Mare	36	15	5	16	57	73	−16	50	
11	Progresul Ciacova	36	15	4	17	58	70	−12	49	
12	Progresul Gătaia	36	14	6	16	67	76	−9	48	
13	UVT Timișoara	36	14	4	18	70	66	+4	46	
14	Flacăra Parța	36	9	11	16	57	63	−6	38	
15	Cocoșul Orțișoara	36	11	5	20	55	77	−22	38	
16	Gloria Moșnița Nouă	36	12	2	22	68	91	−23	38	
17	Unirea Jimbolia	36	7	6	23	59	114	−55	27	
18	Avântul Topolovățu Mare (Note: Avântul Topolovățu Mare was spared from relegation due to the promotion of Peciu Nou in Liga III.)	36	3	3	30	35	151	−116	12	Spared from relegation
19	Steaua Roșie Variaș (R)	36	2	0	34	39	133	−94	6	Relegation to Liga V Timiș
20	Unirea Tomnatic (D)	0	0	0	0	0	0	0	0 (Note: Unirea Tomnatic withdrew after 12 rounds and all its results were canceled.)	Withdrew

Rules for classification: 1) Points; 2) Head-to-head points; 3) Head-to-head goal difference; 4) Head-to-head goals scored; 5) Head-to-head away goals scored; 6) Goal difference; 7) Goals scored.
(C) Champions; (D) Disqualified; (Q) Qualified for the phase indicated; (R) Relegated

=== Tulcea County ===
The Liga IV Tulcea County was played over two stages. The regular season consisted of a double round-robin tournament featuring thirteen teams. At the end of this phase, the top four teams qualified for the championship play-off. Only teams with legal personality and holding a C.I.S. (Certificate of Sports Identity) issued by the Ministry of Youth and Sport were eligible to participate in the championship play-off.

Team changes from the previous season

- Săgeata Stejaru, Delta Tulcea, Beroe Ostrov and Triumf Cerna withdrew.
- Hamangia Baia and Victoria Delta Tulcea were admitted upon request.

Pos	Team	Pld	W	D	L	GF	GA	GD	Pts	Qualification or relegation
1	Hamangia Baia	24	21	2	1	101	22	+79	65	Qualification to championship play-off
2	Pescărușul Sarichioi	24	20	2	2	112	23	+89	62	Qualification to championship play-off
3	Viitorul Murighiol	24	17	2	5	102	36	+66	53	Ineligible for promotion
4	Progresul Isaccea	24	17	1	6	103	57	+46	52	Qualification to championship play-off
5	Flacăra Mihail Kogălniceanu	24	12	3	9	80	79	+1	39	Ineligible for promotion
6	Șoimii Topolog	24	10	6	8	81	58	+23	36	Ineligible for promotion
7	Partizanul Luncavița	24	10	6	8	79	65	+14	36	Ineligible for promotion
8	Național Somova	24	6	5	13	42	71	−29	23	Ineligible for promotion
9	Luceafărul Slava Cercheză	24	6	2	16	37	88	−51	20	Ineligible for promotion
10	Granitul Babadag	24	5	4	15	44	74	−30	19	Qualification to championship play-off
11	Heracleea Enisala	24	5	2	17	42	120	−78	17	
12	Victoria Delta Tulcea (Note: Victoria Delta Tulcea withdrew after 13 rounds and lost all remaining matches with 0–3.)	24	4	3	17	49	61	−12	15	
13	Viitorul Horia	24	4	0	20	33	151	−118	12	
14	Ceres Min Ceamurlia de Jos (Note: Ceres Min Ceamurlia de Jos excluded for two no show-ups and all its results were canceled.) (D)	0	0	0	0	0	0	0	0	Excluded

Rules for classification: 1) Points; 2) Head-to-head points; 3) Head-to-head goal difference; 4) Head-to-head goals scored; 5) Head-to-head away goals scored; 6) Goal difference; 7) Goals scored.
(D) Disqualified
Notes:

Championship play-off
Semi-finals

The matches were played on 4 June 2023 at Delta Stadium in Tulcea.

Team 1	Score	Team 2
Hamangia Baia	8–1	Granitul Babadag
Pescărușul Sarichioi	1–1 (a.e.t.)(4–2 p)	Progresul Isaccea

Final

The match was played on 11 June 2023 at Delta Stadium in Tulcea.

Team 1	Score	Team 2
Hamangia Baia	2–1 (a.e.t.)	Pescărușul Sarichioi

Hamangia Baia won the Liga IV Tulcea County and qualified for the promotion play-off in Liga III.

=== Vaslui County ===
The Liga IV Vaslui County was played in a double round-robin format featuring twelve teams. The top four teams qualified for the championship play-off, contested in a double round-robin format, starting with half of their regular season points (rounded up). The bottom two teams were relegated, while the 9th- and 10th-placed teams faced the 3rd- and 4th-placed teams of Liga V Vaslui in the promotion/relegation play-offs.

Team changes from the previous season

- Rapid Brodoc achieved promotion to Liga III.
- CSM Vaslui (Series I winners and play-off winners) and Sporting Banca (Series III winners and play-off runners-up) were promoted from Liga V Vaslui.
- CSO Negrești (11th place) and Juniorul Bârlad (12th place) were relegated to Liga V Vaslui.
- Atletic Bârlad was admitted upon request.

Pos	Team	Pld	W	D	L	GF	GA	GD	Pts	Qualification or relegation
1	Vaslui	20	20	0	0	104	13	+91	60	Qualification to championship play-off
2	Comstar Vaslui	20	13	2	5	46	27	+19	41	Qualification to championship play-off
3	Flacăra Muntenii de Sus	20	11	5	4	49	30	+19	38	Qualification to championship play-off
4	Viitorul Vetrișoaia	20	9	3	8	57	55	+2	30	Qualification to championship play-off
5	Vulturești	20	9	2	9	36	51	−15	29	
6	Sporting Banca	20	7	4	9	49	47	+2	25	
7	Gârceni	20	7	3	10	40	47	−7	24	
8	Atletic Bârlad	20	7	1	12	40	64	−24	22	
9	Victoria Muntenii de Jos (O)	20	6	3	11	23	43	−20	21	Qualification to relegation play-out
10	Viitorul Văleni (O)	20	3	3	14	22	69	−47	12	Qualification to relegation play-out
11	Vitis Șuletea (Note: Vitis Șuletea was spared from relegation due to the promotion of CSM Vaslui in Liga III.)	20	2	6	12	29	49	−20	12	Spared from relegation
12	Crețești (Note: Crețești was excluded from the championship and all its results were canceled.) (D)	0	0	0	0	0	0	0	0	Excluded

Rules for classification: 1) Points; 2) Head-to-head points; 3) Head-to-head goal difference; 4) Head-to-head goals scored; 5) Head-to-head away goals scored; 6) Goal difference; 7) Goals scored.
(D) Disqualified; (O) Play-off winners
Notes:

Championship play-off

Pos	Team	Pld	W	D	L	GF	GA	GD	Pts	Qualification
1	Vaslui (C, Q)	6	6	0	0	29	3	+26	48	Qualification to promotion play-off
2	Comstar Vaslui	6	2	1	3	8	13	−5	28	
3	Flacăra Muntenii de Sus	6	1	3	2	9	15	−6	25	
4	Viitorul Vetrișoaia	6	0	2	4	7	22	−15	17	

Rules for classification: 1) Points; 2) Head-to-head points; 3) Head-to-head goal difference; 4) Head-to-head goals scored; 5) Head-to-head away goals scored; 6) Goal difference; 7) Goals scored.
(C) Champions; (Q) Qualified for the phase indicated

Relegation play-out

The matches were played on 21 and 28 May 2023.

Team 1	Agg.	Team 2	1st leg	2nd leg
Sporting Juniorul Vaslui	1–14	Viitorul Văleni	0–5	1–9
Viitorul Rebricea	5–6	Victoria Muntenii de Jos	3–3	2–3 (a.e.t.)

=== Vâlcea County ===
Team changes from the previous season

- Cozia Călimănești achieved promotion to Liga III.
- CS Gușoeni was promoted from Liga V Vâlcea.
- Sporting Galicea (winners) declined promotion from Liga V Vâlcea.
- Olympic Râmnicu Vâlcea (14th place) was relegated to Liga V Vâlcea.
- Viitorul Mateești, Atletic Drăgășani and SCM Râmnicu Vâlcea were admitted upon request.

Pos	Team	Pld	W	D	L	GF	GA	GD	Pts	Qualification or relegation
1	Râmnicu Vâlcea (C, Q)	30	27	3	0	177	9	+168	84	Qualification for promotion play-off
2	Sparta Râmnicu Vâlcea	30	27	2	1	145	19	+126	83	
3	Păușești Otăsău	30	23	4	3	101	35	+66	73	
4	Chimia 1973 Râmnicu Vâlcea	30	17	4	9	83	57	+26	55	
5	Mădulari	30	15	4	11	88	58	+30	49	
6	Băbeni	30	14	6	10	76	60	+16	48	
7	Minerul Berbești	30	13	3	14	71	69	+2	42	
8	Oltețul Alunu	30	12	3	15	72	90	−18	39	
9	Atletic Drăgășani	30	11	6	13	48	76	−28	39	
10	Unirea Tomșani	30	11	4	15	64	104	−40	37	
11	Lotru Brezoi	30	11	3	16	56	61	−5	36	
12	Foresta Malaia	30	9	4	17	49	96	−47	31	
13	Gușoeni	30	9	3	18	66	88	−22	30	
14	Viitorul Budești	30	7	0	23	67	128	−61	21	
15	Viitorul Mateești (Note: Viitorul Mateești was spared from relegation due to the promotion of SCM Râmnicu Vâlcea in Liga III.)	30	5	3	22	51	124	−73	18	Spared from relegation
16	Stejarul Vlădești (R)	30	3	0	27	31	171	−140	9	Relegation to Liga V Vâlcea

Rules for classification: 1) Points; 2) Head-to-head points; 3) Head-to-head goal difference; 4) Head-to-head goals scored; 5) Head-to-head away goals scored; 6) Goal difference; 7) Goals scored.
(C) Champions; (Q) Qualified for the phase indicated; (R) Relegated

=== Vrancea County ===
Team changes from the previous season

- Inizio Focșani withdrew.
- CSM Focșani II and CS Jariștea withdrew during the previous season.

Pos	Team	Pld	W	D	L	GF	GA	GD	Pts	Qualification or relegation
1	Victoria Gugești (C, Q)	22	22	0	0	135	15	+120	66	Qualification for promotion play-off
2	Adjud 1946	22	19	1	2	109	12	+97	58	
3	Panciu	22	15	3	4	70	32	+38	48	
4	Viitorul Mărășești	22	14	2	6	64	37	+27	44	
5	Sportul Ciorăști	22	14	1	7	71	33	+38	43	
6	Homocea	22	9	4	9	50	46	+4	31	
7	Dumbrăveni	22	9	0	13	44	62	−18	27	
8	Siretul Suraia	22	7	1	14	34	64	−30	22	
9	Trotușul Ruginești	22	7	1	14	34	86	−52	22	
10	Tractorul Nănești	22	6	2	14	61	81	−20	20	
11	Voința Sihlea	22	1	1	20	20	133	−113	4	
12	Prosport Focșani	22	1	0	21	10	101	−91	3	

Rules for classification: 1) Points; 2) Head-to-head points; 3) Head-to-head goal difference; 4) Head-to-head goals scored; 5) Head-to-head away goals scored; 6) Goal difference; 7) Goals scored.
(C) Champions; (Q) Qualified for the phase indicated

== See also ==
- 2022–23 Liga I
- 2022–23 Liga II
- 2022–23 Liga III
- 2022–23 Cupa României
