= ACS FC Dinamo București =

ACS FC Dinamo
- Full name: Asociația Club Sportiv Fotbal Club Dinamo București
- Nickname: Dinamo Badea
- Short name: Dinamo
- Founded: 2010
- Dissolved: 2025
- Ground: Romprim
- Capacity: 2,500
Home colours	Away colours

Asociația Club Sportiv Fotbal Club Dinamo București, also known as ACS FC Dinamo București or simply ACS FC Dinamo, was a Romanian football club based in Bucharest. The club emerged from the former administrative entity of FC Dinamo București, owning the trademark brand, which continued to be used by the latter. It fielded its own team in the lower leagues from 2017 and was dissolved in 2025 following bankruptcy proceedings

== History ==
In March 2013, Nicolae Badea sold FC Dinamo București to businessman Ionuț Negoiță, while ACS Dinamo București, the company that had managed the club, retained a 7.03% stake in the new company and ownership of the trademark brand. Four years later, in the summer of 2017, Badea enrolled ACS Dinamo București in Liga IV Bucharest, with Marin Dragnea as head coach. The team finished 4th in the regular season and secured 3rd place after the play-off round of the 2017–18 campaign.

During the 2018–19 campaign, the team again ranked 4th in both the regular season and the play-offs. The squad featured former top-flight players Dacian Varga and Cristian Pulhac, with Emil Ursu on the technical bench. In March 2020, the COVID-19 pandemic suspended the competition, leaving the team in 7th place in the 2019–20 season. The team finished 8th in the 2021–22 season, the first full campaign after the pandemic.

The 2022–23 season saw Andrei Cristea, a former Dinamo București player, take charge. The team topped the regular-season standings but ultimately finished 2nd behind former Liga I side Daco-Getica București.

In the following campaign, under Claudiu Ionescu, ACS Dinamo finished 3rd in the regular season behind Progresul 2005 București and CSU Știința București. However, the team excelled in the play-offs, overtaking both rivals to finish 1st. Their campaign culminated in a thrilling promotion play-off against CSL Ștefănești, the Ilfov County champions, which ACS Dinamo won 6–5 on aggregate, scoring the decisive goal in extra time.

In the 2024–25 Liga III season, ACS Dinamo began with Mihai Iosif as head coach, but he was replaced in December following a modest run in Series V. Răzvan Lupu, the son of club chairman and former top-flight player Dănuț Lupu, took over. The team ended the regular season in 9th place and climbed to 7th after the play-out round, narrowly avoiding relegation by two points.

However, in the summer of 2025, ACS FC Dinamo withdrew from Liga III and was officially declared bankrupt on 12 November 2025 by the Bucharest Tribunal, following an insolvency procedure that had lasted more than fifteen years.

== Honours ==
Liga IV – Bucharest

- Winners (1): 2023–24
- Runners-up (1): 2022–23

== League and Cup history ==
Season	Tier	Division	Place	Notes	Cupa României
2024–25	3	Liga III (Seria V)	7th	Withdrew	
2023–24	4	Liga IV (B)	1st (C)	Promoted	
2022–23	4	Liga IV (B)	2nd		
2021–22	4	Liga IV (B)	8th		
2020–21		Not active due to the COVID-19 pandemic			
2019–20	4	Liga IV (B)	7th		
2018–19	4	Liga IV (B)	4th		
2017–18	4	Liga IV (B)	3rd		
