= CSM Fetești =

Romanian football club

- Full name: Club Sportiv Municipal Fetești
- Nickname: Feteștenii (The People from Fetești)
- Short name: Fetești
- Founded: 1945; 81 years ago as Locomotiva CFR Fetești; 1972; 54 years ago as Rapid Fetești; 2018; 8 years ago as CSM Fetești
- Ground: Municipal
- Capacity: 4,000
- Owner: Fetești Municipality
- Chairman: Dragoș Țonea
- Manager: Jan Puclici
- League: Liga IV
- 2025–26: Liga IV, Ialomița County, 8th of 16
Home colours	Away colours

Club Sportiv Municipal Fetești, commonly known as CSM Fetești or simply Fetești, is a Romanian football club based in Fetești, Ialomița County, which currently competes in Liga IV Ialomița, one of the regional divisions of Liga IV, the fourth tier of the Romanian football league system.

Founded in 1945 as Locomotiva CFR Fetești, the club was known as Rapid Fetești following its merger with Viticola Fetești in 1972. After its dissolution in 2018, the club was revived as CSM Fetești. Eleven-time winners of the Ialomița County Championship, the club has played eighteen seasons in the Romanian third division between 1973 and 2025.

== History ==
=== Founding and Early Years (1945–1972) ===
The team was founded in 1945 under the name Locomotiva CFR Fetești, at the initiative of a large number of workers from the Fetești Railway Complex, who had a love for sports. Notable individuals involved in its creation include Oprea Cojocaru, Petre Ion, and Ștefan Iacob.

During this period, several other teams emerged in the city, such as Progresul (the town hall's team), Ogorul (the team of the State Agricultural Enterprise), and Autobuzul (the team of the Regional Transport Enterprise), which played in the lower divisions. Progresul and Ogorul later merged to form a new team, called Viticola. In the summer of 1972, after Viticola lost the promotion play-off to Divizia C, the two leading clubs of the city, Viticola and Locomotiva CFR, decided to merge to create a stronger club for Fetești. Thus, Rapid Fetești was born.

=== Rise and Fall (1972–2018) ===
In the first season, Rapid Fetești managed to win the Ialomița County Championship and earned promotion to Divizia C, where it played for the next three seasons, finishing 10th in Series IV in the 1973–74 season, 9th in the same series in the 1974–75 season, and relegating back to the fourth division after the 1975–76 season, when ranked 16th in Series V.

After missing promotion in the 1977–78 season, losing the play-off against Voința Constanța, the winner of the Constanța County Championship (2–0 at home and 0–4 away), Rapid Fetești returned to Divizia C at the end of the 1978–79 season, winning the County Championship for the second consecutive time. This time, the team was promoted directly, without needing to play a promotion play-off, taking advantage of the fact that Ialomița County was less represented in the third division.

Feteștenii spent the next six seasons in Series IV of Divizia C, ranking as follows: 12th in 1979–80, 5th in 1980–81, 3rd in 1981–82 – the best performance in the club's history up to that point – 10th in 1982–83, 8th in 1983–84, and 15th in 1984–85, after which it was relegated.

The club managed to return to Divizia C in 1989, but once again without notable results: narrowly avoided relegation in the 1989–90 season, finishing 14th out of 16, then placed 11th in 1990–91, and was relegated again at the end of the 1991–92 season, after finishing 15th.

Another comeback followed in 1993, but after finishing 13th in the 1993–94 season, the club faced major financial difficulties in the following year due to the withdrawal of its main sponsor, Elcom, and withdrew from Divizia C after just nine rounds.

Between 1994 and 2002, Rapid Fetești became a consistent top-half finisher in the first football division of Ialomița County. In the 2001–02 season, the club won Divizia D – Ialomița County for the fifth time, but failed to secure promotion after losing the play-off against Turistul Pietroasa Haleș, the champions of Divizia D – Buzău County, with a score of 1–4 in the match played at Strejnic.

After a long spell of eighteen seasons in the fourth league, Rapid Fetești achieved promotion to Liga III at the end of a successful 2011–12 campaign. The team won LLiga IV – Ialomița County and secured promotion after defeating the champions of Liga IV – Brăila County, Victoria Traian, 3–0 on penalty shoot-out in the promotion play-off, played on neutral ground in Berca.

In the 2012–13 season, Rapid endured a difficult campaign in the third tier, finishing in 9th place and narrowly avoiding relegation only due to the withdrawal of other teams. However, the following season ended in relegation, with a finish of 11th out of 12.

In the 2014–15 season, due to financial difficulties, the club enrolled in Liga V – Ialomița County, the fifth tier of Romanian football, and secured immediate promotion back to Liga IV, finishing the season unbeaten.

Upon returning to first football division of Ialomița County, Rapid Fetești finished 3rd in two consecutive seasons (2015–16 and 2016–17), but withdrew for financial reasons during the winter break of the 2017–18 season. All remaining matches were lost by default (0–3) under competition rules, and the season concluded with a 14th-place finish.

Chronology of names
Period	Name
1945–1972	Locomotiva CFR Fetești
1972–1993	Rapid Fetești
1993–1994	Rapid Elcom Fetești
1994–2018	Rapid Fetești
2018–present	CSM Fetești

=== Revival and the Formation of CSM Fetești (2018–Present) ===
In the summer of 2018, to continue the football legacy, the Fetești municipality founded Club Sportiv Municipal Fetești, which does not carry the official record of the former Rapid Fetești team. At the beginning of the 2018–19 season, CSM Fetești purchased the fourth division spot of newly promoted Fulgerul Fierbinți and finished the championship in 9th place.

The 2019–20 season was suspended in March 2020 due to the COVID-19 pandemic in Romania, with the team sitting in 10th place at the time.

With Mircea Ștefan as head coach, CSM Fetești won the shortened 2020–21 season of Liga IV Ialomița and secured promotion by defeating Liga III side Făurei in the promotion/relegation play-off on the away goals rule (2–2 away and 0–0 at home), marking a return to the third division after a seven-year absence.

However, relegation followed at the end of the 2021–22 season, after a 9th-place finish in Series III of Liga III. Following the departure of Mircea Ștefan, Vasile Dumitru was appointed as head coach. Under his leadership, Feteștenii finished 2nd in the East Series of the regular season and were runners-up in the 2022–23 season. In 2023, the club also won the Ialomița County phase of the Cupa României.

As a result, CSM Fetești qualified for the regional phase of the 2023–24 Cupa României, reaching the Regional 6 final, where it lost 1–3 to Viitorul Ileana. In the 2023–24 season, the team finished 1st in both the East Series and the championship play-off, earning promotion back to Liga III after defeating Venus Independența, the Călărași County champions, in the promotion play-off. CSM Fetești won the away leg 4–0 but lost the return leg 1–3 at home, advancing on aggregate.

Following their return to Liga III, Claudiu Ionescu was appointed as head coach. However, the team finished last in Series III of the 2024–25 season and were relegated.

== Honours ==
Liga IV – Ialomița County

- Winners (11): 1972–73, 1977–78, 1978–79, 1985–86, 1987–88, 1988–89, 1992–93, 2001–02, 2011–12, 2020–21, 2023–24
- Runners-up (2): 1970–71, 2022–23

Liga V – Ialomița County

- Winners (1): 2014–15

Cupa României – Ialomița County

- Winners (2): 2001–02, 2022–23

== League and cup history ==
Season	Tier	Division	Place	Notes	Cupa României
2024–25	3	Liga III (Seria III)	10th	Relegated	Regional phase - F
2023–24	4	Liga IV (IL)	1st (C)	Promoted	County phase - W
2022–23	4	Liga IV (IL)	2nd		First round
2021–22	3	Liga III (Seria III)	9th	Relegated	
2020–21	4	Liga IV (IL)	1st (C)	Promoted	County phase - SF
2019–20	4	Liga IV (IL)	10th		
2018–19	4	Liga IV (IL)	9th		
2017–18	4	Liga IV (IL)	14th		
2016–17	4	Liga IV (IL)	3rd		
2015–16	4	Liga IV (IL)	3rd		
2014–15	5	Liga V (IL)	1st (C)	Promoted	
2013–14	3	Liga III (Seria II)	11th	Relegated	
2012–13	3	Liga III (Seria II)	9th		
2011–12	4	Liga IV (IL)	1st (C)	Promoted	
2010–11	4	Liga IV (IL)	6th		
2009–10	4	Liga IV (IL)	3rd		

== Former managers ==
- (Romania) Dumitru Dumitriu (1977–1978)
- (Romania) Mircea Ștefan (2020–2022)
- (Romania) Vasile Dumitru (2022–2024)
- (Romania) Claudiu Ionescu (2024–2025)
- (Romania) Jan Puclici (2025–)
