= Municipal Stadium (Fetești) =

Multi-use stadium in Fetești, Romania

- Interactive map of Municipal Stadium
- Former names: Tineretului Stadium
- Address: Str. Begoniilor
- Location: Fetești, Romania
- Coordinates: 44°24′25.5″N 27°50′00.0″E
- Owner: Municipality of Fetești
- Operator: CSM Fetești
- Capacity: 4,000 on seats
- Surface: Grass

Construction
- Opened: 1950s
- Renovated: 1980s, 2010s, 2020s

Tenant
- CSM Fetești (1950–present)

The Municipal Stadium is a multi-use stadium in Fetești, Romania. It is used mostly for football matches, is the home ground of CSM Fetești and holds 4,000 people on seats. The stadium was renovated several times, most recently in 2023 and in the past was known as Tineretului Stadium.
