= 2009–10 Liga IV =

Liga IV
- Season: 2009–10

The 2009–10 Liga IV season was the 82nd season of Liga IV, the fourth tier of the Romanian football league system. The champions of each county association played against those from neighboring counties in a playoff held at neutral venues for promotion to the 2010–11 Liga III.

== County leagues ==
- Alba (AB)
- Arad (AR)
- Argeș (AG)
- Bacău (BC)
- Bihor (BH)
- Bistrița-Năsăud (BN)
- Botoșani (BT)
- Brașov (BV)
- Brăila (BR)
- Bucharest (B)
- Buzău (BZ)
- Caraș-Severin (CS)
- Călărași (CL)
- Cluj (CJ)
- Constanța (CT)
- Covasna (CV)
- Dâmbovița (DB)
- Dolj (DJ)
- Galați (GL)
- Giurgiu (GR)
- Gorj (GJ)
- Harghita (HR)
- Hunedoara (HD)
- Ialomița (IL)
- Iași (IS)
- Ilfov (IF)
- Maramureș (MM)
- Mehedinți (MH)
- Mureș (MS)
- Neamț (NT)
- Olt (OT)
- Prahova (PH)
- Satu Mare (SM)
- Sălaj (SJ)
- Sibiu (SB)
- Suceava (SV)
- Teleorman (TR)
- Timiș (TM)
- Tulcea (TL)
- Vaslui (VS)
- Vâlcea (VL)
- Vrancea (VN)

== Promotion play-off ==
The matches were played on 15 June 2010.

| Team 1 | Score | Team 2 |
|---|---|---|
| Nova Force Giurgiu (GR) | 1–2 | (CL) Phoenix Ulmu |
| Dinamo ARI Râșești (VS) | 1–2 | (BR) Recolta Tufești |
| Petrolul Țicleni (GJ) | 0–4 | (OT) Slatina |
| Avântul Vânători (GL) | 1–0 | (CT) Peștera |
| Frontiera Curtici (AR) | 0–2 | (CS) Autocatania Caransebeș |
| Luceafărul Mihai Eminescu (BT) | 3–1 | (BN) Vointa Mărișelu |
| Victoria Carei (SM) | 0–4 | (MM) Spicul Mocira |
| Atletic Bradu (AG) | 4–2 | (VL) Oltul Ionești |
| Rapid Dumești (IS) | 0–1 | (SV) Foresta Mălini |
| Plopeni (PH) | 3–0 | (DB) Gloria Cornești |
| Performanța Ighiu (AB) | 1–3 | (SB) Voința Sibiu II |
| Mesagerul Bacău (BC) | 1–1 (a.e.t.) (8–7 p) | (MS) Gaz Metan Târgu Mureș |
| Afumați (IF) | 2–5 | (B) Spic de Grâu București |
| Victoria Țăndărei (IL) | 3–5 | (TL) Eolica Baia |
| Bioland Paleu (BH) | 0–0 (a.e.t.) (4–5 p) | (SJ) Someșul Ileanda |
| Chișoda (TM) | 1–2 | (MH) Termo Drobeta-Turnu Severin |
| SCM Brașov (BV) | 2–1 | (CV) Zagon |
| Adjud (VN) | 2–6 | (BZ) ABC Stoicescu |
| ASA Miercurea Ciuc Bălan (HR) | 3–2 | (NT) Energia Girov |
| Sopot (DJ) | 1–2 | (TR) Dunărea Turris Turnu Măgurele |
| Hunedoara (HD) | 0–2 | (CJ) Unirea Florești |

== Leagues standings ==
=== Alba County ===
| Pos | Team | Pld | W | D | L | GF | GA | GD | Pts | Qualification or relegation |
|---|---|---|---|---|---|---|---|---|---|---|
| 1 | Performanța Ighiu (C, Q) | 30 | 23 | 2 | 5 | 95 | 36 | +59 | 71 | Qualification to promotion play-off |
| 2 | FC Cugir | 30 | 19 | 2 | 9 | 80 | 50 | +30 | 59 | |
| 3 | Ocna Mureș | 30 | 18 | 3 | 9 | 93 | 46 | +47 | 57 | |
| 4 | Mureșul Oarda de Jos | 30 | 18 | 2 | 10 | 78 | 50 | +28 | 56 | |
| 5 | Dalia Sport Daia Romană | 30 | 14 | 10 | 6 | 50 | 23 | +27 | 52 | |
| 6 | Viitorul Sântimbru | 30 | 13 | 5 | 12 | 50 | 52 | −2 | 44 | |
| 7 | Metalul Aiud | 30 | 13 | 4 | 13 | 69 | 51 | +18 | 43 | |
| 8 | Rapid CFR Teiuș | 30 | 13 | 4 | 13 | 74 | 58 | +16 | 43 | |
| 9 | Arieșul Apuseni | 29 | 13 | 4 | 12 | 53 | 54 | −1 | 43 | |
| 10 | Viitorul Unirea | 30 | 14 | 1 | 15 | 67 | 79 | −12 | 43 | |
| 11 | Olimpia Aiud | 30 | 10 | 11 | 9 | 32 | 37 | −5 | 41 | |
| 12 | Cuprirom Abrud | 30 | 12 | 4 | 14 | 46 | 57 | −11 | 40 | |
| 13 | Recolta Galda de Jos | 30 | 11 | 4 | 15 | 40 | 46 | −6 | 37 | |
| 14 | CIL Blaj (R) | 30 | 9 | 8 | 13 | 45 | 53 | −8 | 35 | Relegation to Liga V Alba |
| 15 | Fortuna Lunca Mureșului (R) | 30 | 5 | 3 | 22 | 36 | 99 | −63 | 18 | Relegation to Liga V Alba |
| 16 | Balomir Acmariu (R) | 29 | 0 | 1 | 28 | 16 | 133 | −117 | 1 | Relegation to Liga V Alba |

Rules for classification: 1) Points; 2) Head-to-head points; 3) Head-to-head goal difference; 4) Head-to-head goals scored; 5) Head-to-head away goals scored; 6) Goal difference; 7) Goals scored.
(C) Champions; (Q) Qualified for the phase indicated; (R) Relegated

=== Arad County ===
| Pos | Team | Pld | W | D | L | GF | GA | GD | Pts | Qualification or relegation |
|---|---|---|---|---|---|---|---|---|---|---|
| 1 | Frontiera Curtici (C, Q) | 34 | 28 | 3 | 3 | 142 | 29 | +113 | 87 | Qualification to promotion play-off |
| 2 | Șoimii Pâncota | 34 | 25 | 3 | 6 | 86 | 43 | +43 | 78 | |
| 3 | Unirea Sântana | 34 | 21 | 4 | 9 | 96 | 58 | +38 | 67 | |
| 4 | Vladimirescu | 34 | 19 | 5 | 10 | 74 | 47 | +27 | 62 | |
| 5 | Voința Mailat | 34 | 16 | 8 | 10 | 60 | 28 | +32 | 56 | |
| 6 | Avântul Târnova | 34 | 15 | 7 | 12 | 56 | 52 | +4 | 52 | |
| 7 | Progresul Pecica | 34 | 14 | 7 | 13 | 55 | 45 | +10 | 49 | |
| 8 | Universitatea Sebiș | 34 | 13 | 10 | 11 | 57 | 55 | +2 | 49 | |
| 9 | Victoria Pro Nădlac | 34 | 15 | 4 | 15 | 60 | 60 | 0 | 49 | |
| 10 | Înfrățirea Iratoșu | 34 | 15 | 2 | 17 | 73 | 73 | 0 | 47 | |
| 11 | Aqua Vest Arad | 34 | 13 | 7 | 14 | 63 | 58 | +5 | 46 | |
| 12 | Sânleani | 34 | 12 | 8 | 14 | 51 | 54 | −3 | 44 | |
| 13 | Păulișana Păuliș | 34 | 12 | 4 | 18 | 66 | 80 | −14 | 40 | |
| 14 | Unirea Șeitin | 34 | 11 | 6 | 17 | 65 | 79 | −14 | 39 | |
| 15 | Dorobanți | 34 | 10 | 8 | 16 | 43 | 61 | −18 | 38 | |
| 16 | Crișul Chișineu-Criș (R) | 34 | 12 | 2 | 20 | 63 | 106 | −43 | 38 | Relegation to Liga V Arad |
| 17 | Crișul Alb Șicula (R) | 34 | 5 | 2 | 27 | 24 | 113 | −89 | 17 | Relegation to Liga V Arad |
| 18 | Șoimii Lipova (R) | 34 | 4 | 2 | 28 | 19 | 112 | −93 | 14 | Relegation to Liga V Arad |

Rules for classification: 1) Points; 2) Head-to-head points; 3) Head-to-head goal difference; 4) Head-to-head goals scored; 5) Head-to-head away goals scored; 6) Goal difference; 7) Goals scored.
(C) Champions; (Q) Qualified for the phase indicated; (R) Relegated

=== Argeș County ===
| Pos | Team | Pld | W | D | L | GF | GA | GD | Pts | Qualification or relegation |
|---|---|---|---|---|---|---|---|---|---|---|
| 1 | Atletic Bradu (C, Q) | 32 | 30 | 1 | 1 | 138 | 19 | +119 | 91 | Qualification to promotion play-off |
| 2 | Rucăr | 32 | 29 | 2 | 1 | 125 | 15 | +110 | 89 | |
| 3 | Rapid Pitești | 32 | 24 | 2 | 6 | 108 | 23 | +85 | 74 | |
| 4 | DLR Pitești | 32 | 21 | 5 | 6 | 108 | 39 | +69 | 68 | |
| 5 | Bogați | 32 | 21 | 4 | 7 | 89 | 47 | +42 | 67 | |
| 6 | Argeș Pitești III | 31 | 18 | 1 | 12 | 85 | 50 | +35 | 55 | |
| 7 | Sporting Câmpulung | 32 | 16 | 6 | 10 | 74 | 41 | +33 | 54 | |
| 8 | Unirea Costești | 32 | 14 | 2 | 16 | 65 | 77 | −12 | 44 | |
| 9 | Bascov | 32 | 12 | 7 | 13 | 53 | 50 | +3 | 43 | |
| 10 | Olimpia Suseni | 32 | 12 | 5 | 15 | 67 | 81 | −14 | 41 | |
| 11 | Domnești | 32 | 12 | 4 | 16 | 70 | 71 | −1 | 40 | |
| 12 | Miroși | 32 | 11 | 3 | 18 | 56 | 88 | −32 | 36 | |
| 13 | Viitorul Ștefănești | 32 | 8 | 5 | 19 | 45 | 74 | −29 | 29 | |
| 14 | Stâlpeni Rădești | 32 | 8 | 4 | 20 | 60 | 92 | −32 | 28 | |
| 15 | Săpata (R) | 32 | 8 | 2 | 22 | 35 | 105 | −70 | 26 (Note: Săpata and Speranța Costești withdrew in the second part of the season and lost all the remaining matches with 0–3.) | Relegation to Liga V Argeș |
| 16 | Dinamic Concordia Pitești | 32 | 5 | 6 | 21 | 55 | 129 | −74 | 21 | |
| 17 | Top Arena Topoloveni | 31 | 5 | 0 | 26 | 34 | 168 | −134 | 15 | |
| 18 | Speranța Costești (R) | 32 | 2 | 0 | 30 | 25 | 147 | −122 | 6 | Relegation to Liga V Argeș |
| 19 | Internațional Curtea de Argeș II (D) | 0 | 0 | 0 | 0 | 0 | 0 | 0 | 0 (Note: Internațional Curtea de Argeș II and Flacăra Boteni withdrew in the first part of the season and all their results were canceled.) | Withdrew |
| 20 | Flacăra Boteni (D) | 0 | 0 | 0 | 0 | 0 | 0 | 0 | 0 | Withdrew |

Rules for classification: 1) Points; 2) Head-to-head points; 3) Head-to-head goal difference; 4) Head-to-head goals scored; 5) Head-to-head away goals scored; 6) Goal difference; 7) Goals scored.
(C) Champions; (D) Disqualified; (Q) Qualified for the phase indicated; (R) Relegated

=== Bacău County ===
| Pos | Team | Pld | W | D | L | GF | GA | GD | Pts | Qualification or relegation |
|---|---|---|---|---|---|---|---|---|---|---|
| 1 | Mesagerul Bacău (C, Q) | 28 | 22 | 5 | 1 | 91 | 25 | +66 | 71 | Qualification to promotion play-off |
| 2 | Mondosport Bacău | 28 | 21 | 5 | 2 | 78 | 12 | +66 | 68 | |
| 3 | Filipești | 28 | 18 | 5 | 5 | 83 | 35 | +48 | 59 | |
| 4 | Inter Căiuți | 28 | 15 | 5 | 8 | 75 | 42 | +33 | 50 | |
| 5 | FCM Onești | 28 | 13 | 3 | 12 | 61 | 55 | +6 | 42 | |
| 6 | Aerostar Bacău II | 28 | 12 | 5 | 11 | 61 | 52 | +9 | 41 | |
| 7 | Sportul Răcăciuni | 28 | 10 | 6 | 12 | 53 | 65 | −12 | 36 | |
| 8 | Buhuși | 28 | 10 | 5 | 13 | 45 | 39 | +6 | 35 | |
| 9 | Voința Oituz | 28 | 9 | 8 | 11 | 47 | 59 | −12 | 35 | |
| 10 | Negri | 28 | 9 | 7 | 12 | 41 | 52 | −11 | 34 | |
| 11 | Consart Șerbănești | 28 | 10 | 2 | 16 | 54 | 61 | −7 | 32 | |
| 12 | Înfrățirea Ghimeș | 28 | 8 | 7 | 13 | 31 | 62 | −31 | 31 | |
| 13 | Măgura Târgu Ocna | 28 | 6 | 11 | 11 | 30 | 48 | −18 | 29 | |
| 14 | Athletic Dărmănești | 28 | 6 | 4 | 18 | 38 | 71 | −33 | 22 | |
| 15 | Bradul Mânăstirea Cașin | 28 | 1 | 2 | 25 | 19 | 129 | −110 | 5 | |
| 16 | Siretul Prăjești (R) | 0 | 0 | 0 | 0 | 0 | 0 | 0 | 0 (Note: Siretul Prăjești withdrew in the first part of the season and all its results were canceled.') | Expelled |
| 17 | Voința Podul Turcului (R) | 0 | 0 | 0 | 0 | 0 | 0 | 0 | 0 (Note: Voința Podul Turcului withdrew in the first part of the season and all its results were canceled.) | Expelled |
| 18 | Mărgineni (R) | 0 | 0 | 0 | 0 | 0 | 0 | 0 | 0 (Note: Mărgineni withdrew in the first part of the season and all its results were canceled.) | Expelled |

Rules for classification: 1) Points; 2) Head-to-head points; 3) Head-to-head goal difference; 4) Head-to-head goals scored; 5) Head-to-head away goals scored; 6) Goal difference; 7) Goals scored.
(C) Champions; (Q) Qualified for the phase indicated; (R) Relegated

=== Bihor County ===
| Pos | Team | Pld | W | D | L | GF | GA | GD | Pts | Qualification or relegation |
|---|---|---|---|---|---|---|---|---|---|---|
| 1 | Bioland Paleu (C, Q) | 30 | 29 | 0 | 1 | 112 | 10 | +102 | 87 | Qualification for promotion play-off |
| 2 | Unirea Valea lui Mihai | 30 | 26 | 2 | 2 | 112 | 19 | +93 | 80 | |
| 3 | Poiana Budureasa | 30 | 19 | 6 | 5 | 88 | 38 | +50 | 63 | |
| 4 | Viitorul Popești | 30 | 17 | 5 | 8 | 78 | 36 | +42 | 56 | |
| 5 | Victoria Avram Iancu | 30 | 17 | 1 | 12 | 66 | 49 | +17 | 52 | |
| 6 | Crișul Aleșd | 30 | 14 | 7 | 9 | 80 | 57 | +23 | 49 | |
| 7 | Locadin Țețchea | 30 | 15 | 2 | 13 | 80 | 76 | +4 | 47 | |
| 8 | Frontiera Oradea | 30 | 13 | 3 | 14 | 62 | 65 | −3 | 42 | |
| 9 | Cetatea Biharia | 30 | 12 | 1 | 17 | 53 | 65 | −12 | 37 | |
| 10 | Bihor Oradea II (Note: Bihor Oradea II withdrew from the championship after the end of the first part and lost the remaining matches with 0-3.) (R) | 30 | 11 | 2 | 17 | 54 | 60 | −6 | 35 | Relegation to Liga V Bihor |
| 11 | Tricolorul Alparea | 30 | 9 | 4 | 17 | 53 | 57 | −4 | 31 | |
| 12 | Stăruința Săcuieni | 30 | 8 | 4 | 18 | 50 | 85 | −35 | 28 | |
| 13 | Liberty Salonta | 30 | 6 | 5 | 19 | 64 | 105 | −41 | 23 | |
| 14 | Biharea Vașcău | 30 | 6 | 6 | 18 | 39 | 81 | −42 | 21 (Note: Biharea Vașcău deducted 3 points, because she retired from the field in the match with Locadin Țețchea.) | |
| 15 | Oțelul Ștei (Note: Oțelul Ștei withdrew from the championship after the end of the first part and lost the remaining matches with 0-3.) (R) | 30 | 6 | 1 | 23 | 30 | 87 | −57 | 19 | Relegation to Liga V Bihor |
| 16 | Izvorul Cociuba Mare (R) | 30 | 6 | 1 | 23 | 36 | 129 | −93 | 19 | Relegation to Liga V Bihor |

Rules for classification: Rules for classification: 1) Points 2) Head-to-head points; 3) Head-to-head goal difference; 4) Head-to-head goals scored; 5) Head-to-head away goals scored; 6) Goal difference; 7) Goals scored.
(C) Champions; (Q) Qualified for the phase indicated; (R) Relegated

=== Bistrița-Năsăud County ===
| Pos | Team | Pld | W | D | L | GF | GA | GD | Pts | Qualification or relegation |
|---|---|---|---|---|---|---|---|---|---|---|
| 1 | Voința Mărișelu (C, Q) | 26 | 22 | 2 | 2 | 119 | 49 | +70 | 68 | Qualification to promotion play-off |
| 2 | Heniu Prundu Bârgăului | 26 | 18 | 3 | 5 | 79 | 41 | +38 | 57 | |
| 3 | Victoria Uriu | 26 | 16 | 2 | 8 | 103 | 54 | +49 | 50 | |
| 4 | Progresul Năsăud | 26 | 13 | 7 | 6 | 56 | 33 | +23 | 46 | |
| 5 | Progresul Jelna | 26 | 14 | 4 | 8 | 75 | 51 | +24 | 46 | |
| 6 | Gironic Rebra | 26 | 12 | 3 | 11 | 58 | 68 | −10 | 39 | |
| 7 | Steaua Monariu | 26 | 10 | 5 | 11 | 45 | 58 | −13 | 35 | |
| 8 | Eciro Forest Telciu | 26 | 11 | 2 | 13 | 58 | 63 | −5 | 35 | |
| 9 | Someșul Rebrișoara | 26 | 11 | 2 | 13 | 55 | 56 | −1 | 35 | |
| 10 | Silvicultorul Maieru | 26 | 10 | 3 | 13 | 71 | 71 | 0 | 33 | |
| 11 | Voința Cetate | 26 | 10 | 2 | 14 | 51 | 69 | −18 | 32 | |
| 12 | Viitorul Lechința | 26 | 9 | 3 | 14 | 56 | 81 | −25 | 30 | |
| 13 | Progresul Tăure (R) | 26 | 3 | 3 | 20 | 26 | 86 | −60 | 12 | Relegation to Liga V Bistrița-Năsăud |
| 14 | Șoimii Chiraleș (R) | 26 | 2 | 1 | 23 | 42 | 114 | −72 | 7 | Relegation to Liga V Bistrița-Năsăud |

Rules for classification: 1) Points; 2) Head-to-head points; 3) Head-to-head goal difference; 4) Head-to-head goals scored; 5) Head-to-head away goals scored; 6) Goal difference; 7) Goals scored.
(C) Champions; (Q) Qualified for the phase indicated; (R) Relegated

=== Botoșani County ===
| Pos | Team | Pld | W | D | L | GF | GA | GD | Pts | Qualification or relegation |
|---|---|---|---|---|---|---|---|---|---|---|
| 1 | Luceafărul Mihai Eminescu (C, Q) | 26 | 22 | 3 | 1 | 78 | 10 | +68 | 69 | Qualification to promotion play-off |
| 2 | Vorona | 26 | 17 | 5 | 4 | 81 | 35 | +46 | 56 | |
| 3 | Roma | 26 | 18 | 2 | 6 | 75 | 33 | +42 | 56 | |
| 4 | Păltiniș | 26 | 14 | 5 | 7 | 62 | 35 | +27 | 47 | |
| 5 | Dorohoi | 26 | 14 | 3 | 9 | 61 | 44 | +17 | 45 | |
| 6 | Bucecea | 26 | 12 | 2 | 12 | 42 | 52 | −10 | 38 | |
| 7 | Darabani | 26 | 10 | 6 | 10 | 37 | 42 | −5 | 36 | |
| 8 | Bucovina Rogojești | 26 | 10 | 2 | 14 | 43 | 69 | −26 | 32 | |
| 9 | Nord Star Pomârla | 26 | 9 | 3 | 14 | 50 | 55 | −5 | 30 | |
| 10 | Avântul Albești | 26 | 9 | 1 | 16 | 48 | 66 | −18 | 28 | |
| 11 | Prosport Vârfu Câmpului | 26 | 8 | 3 | 15 | 41 | 70 | −29 | 27 | |
| 12 | Rapid Ungureni (O) | 26 | 7 | 4 | 15 | 41 | 70 | −29 | 25 | Qualification to relegation play-off |
| 13 | Voința Șendriceni (R) | 26 | 6 | 3 | 17 | 37 | 62 | −25 | 21 | Qualification to relegation play-off |
| 14 | Unirea Săveni (R) | 26 | 4 | 2 | 20 | 31 | 84 | −53 | 14 | Relegation to Liga V Botoșani |

Rules for classification: 1) Points; 2) Head-to-head points; 3) Head-to-head goal difference; 4) Head-to-head goals scored; 5) Head-to-head away goals scored; 6) Goal difference; 7) Goals scored.
(C) Champions; (O) Play-off winners; (Q) Qualified for the phase indicated; (R) Relegated

Relegation play-off

The 12th and 13th-placed teams of the Liga IV faces the 2nd placed teams from the two series of Liga V Botoșani.

| Team 1 | Score | Team 2 |
|---|---|---|
| Voința Șendriceni | 1–2 | Leorda |
| Rapid Ungureni | 3–2 | Flacăra 1907 Flămânzi |

=== Brașov County ===
| Pos | Team | Pld | W | D | L | GF | GA | GD | Pts | Qualification or relegation |
|---|---|---|---|---|---|---|---|---|---|---|
| 1 | SCM Brașov (C, Q) | 34 | 27 | 4 | 3 | 92 | 25 | +67 | 85 | Qualification to promotion play-off |
| 2 | Făgăraș | 34 | 21 | 6 | 7 | 82 | 36 | +46 | 69 | |
| 3 | Ghimbav 2000 | 34 | 20 | 8 | 6 | 66 | 33 | +33 | 68 | |
| 4 | Forex Brașov | 34 | 17 | 10 | 7 | 73 | 39 | +34 | 61 | |
| 5 | Viitorul Ghimbav | 34 | 19 | 4 | 11 | 73 | 44 | +29 | 61 | |
| 6 | Râșnov | 34 | 17 | 5 | 12 | 69 | 56 | +13 | 56 | |
| 7 | Înfrățirea Hărman | 34 | 14 | 9 | 11 | 57 | 41 | +16 | 51 | |
| 8 | Viromet Victoria | 34 | 15 | 4 | 15 | 71 | 73 | −2 | 49 | |
| 9 | Aripile Brașov | 34 | 13 | 5 | 16 | 59 | 63 | −4 | 44 | |
| 10 | Carpați Berivoi | 34 | 13 | 4 | 17 | 64 | 86 | −22 | 43 | |
| 11 | Cetatea Rupea | 34 | 11 | 8 | 15 | 51 | 51 | 0 | 41 | |
| 12 | Jibert | 34 | 11 | 8 | 15 | 53 | 58 | −5 | 41 | |
| 13 | Celuloza Zărnești | 34 | 12 | 5 | 17 | 60 | 70 | −10 | 41 | |
| 14 | CFR Brașov | 34 | 13 | 1 | 20 | 57 | 77 | −20 | 40 | |
| 15 | Energia Unirea Feldioara | 34 | 11 | 7 | 16 | 44 | 67 | −23 | 40 | |
| 16 | Olimpic Voila (R) | 34 | 11 | 3 | 20 | 40 | 75 | −35 | 36 | Relegation to Liga V Brașov |
| 17 | Inter Cristian | 34 | 9 | 3 | 22 | 53 | 70 | −17 | 30 | Relegation to Liga V Brașov |
| 18 | Izvorul Hoghiz (R) | 34 | 4 | 3 | 27 | 28 | 108 | −80 | 15 | Relegation to Liga V Brașov |

Rules for classification: 1) Points; 2) Head-to-head points; 3) Head-to-head goal difference; 4) Head-to-head goals scored; 5) Head-to-head away goals scored; 6) Goal difference; 7) Goals scored.
(C) Champions; (Q) Qualified for the phase indicated; (R) Relegated

=== Brăila County ===
| Pos | Team | Pld | W | D | L | GF | GA | GD | Pts |
|---|---|---|---|---|---|---|---|---|---|
| 1 | Recolta Tufești | 25 | 24 | 1 | 0 | 112 | 22 | +90 | 73 |
| 2 | Avântul Cireșu | 25 | 20 | 2 | 3 | 85 | 29 | +56 | 62 |
| 3 | Victoria Traian | 25 | 18 | 1 | 6 | 60 | 24 | +36 | 55 |
| 4 | FC Urleasca | 25 | 17 | 2 | 6 | 79 | 30 | +49 | 53 |
| 5 | Viitorul Galbenu | 25 | 13 | 3 | 9 | 57 | 40 | +17 | 42 |
| 6 | Voința Găiseanca | 25 | 11 | 2 | 12 | 55 | 63 | −8 | 35 |
| 7 | Sportul Chiscani | 25 | 10 | 4 | 11 | 70 | 55 | +15 | 34 |
| 8 | Victoria Dedulești | 20 | 7 | 2 | 11 | 32 | 59 | −27 | 34 (Note: 11 bonus points?) |
| 9 | Victoria Cazasu | 25 | 10 | 3 | 12 | 49 | 56 | −7 | 33 |
| 10 | CS Făurei | 25 | 8 | 4 | 13 | 43 | 57 | −14 | 28 |
| 11 | Unirea Măxineni | 25 | 7 | 2 | 16 | 45 | 61 | −16 | 23 |
| 12 | Avântul Mircea Vodă | 25 | 6 | 4 | 15 | 46 | 92 | −46 | 22 |
| 13 | Tractorul Viziru | 25 | 2 | 2 | 21 | 17 | 94 | −77 | 8 |
| 14 | Dacia Bertești | 25 | 1 | 3 | 21 | 32 | 113 | −81 | 6 |

=== Bucharest ===
Second play-off

The second championship play-off was contested between the top three teams from each of the two groups in the first championship play-off. All matches were played at the Rocar ANEFS Stadium in Bucharest on 25, 28 May and 1 June 2010.

Group 1

| Pos | Team | Pld | W | D | L | GF | GA | GD | Pts | Qualification |
|---|---|---|---|---|---|---|---|---|---|---|
| 1 | Spic de Grâu București | 2 | 1 | 1 | 0 | 2 | 1 | +1 | 4 | Qualification to final |
| 2 | Metaloglobus București | 2 | 1 | 0 | 1 | 1 | 1 | 0 | 3 | |
| 3 | Concordia 2009 București | 2 | 0 | 1 | 1 | 1 | 2 | −1 | 1 | |

Rules for classification: 1) Points; 2) Head-to-head points; 3) Head-to-head goal difference; 4) Head-to-head goals scored; 5) Goal difference; 7) Goals scored.

| 25 May 2010 | Spic de Grâu București | 1–1 (4–2 p) | Concordia 2009 București |

| 28 May 2010 | Concordia 2009 București | 0–1 | Metaloglobus București |

| 1 June 2010 | Metaloglobus București | 0–1 | Spic de Grâu București |

Group 2

| Pos | Team | Pld | W | D | L | GF | GA | GD | Pts | Qualification |
|---|---|---|---|---|---|---|---|---|---|---|
| 1 | Concordia Chiajna II (Q) | 2 | 1 | 1 | 0 | 7 | 3 | +4 | 4 | Qualification to final |
| 2 | Chitila | 2 | 1 | 1 | 0 | 3 | 2 | +1 | 4 | |
| 3 | Termo București | 2 | 0 | 0 | 2 | 3 | 8 | −5 | 0 | |

Rules for classification: 1) Points; 2) Head-to-head points; 3) Head-to-head goal difference; 4) Head-to-head goals scored; 5) Goal difference; 7) Goals scored.
(Q) Qualified for the phase indicated

| 25 May 2010 | Termo București | 1–2 | Chitila |

| 28 May 2010 | Chitila | 1–1 (3–4 p) | Concordia Chiajna II |

| 1 June 2010 | Concordia Chiajna II | 6–2 | Termo București |

Final

The match was played on 4 June 2010 at Dinamo Stadium in Bucharest.

| 4 June 2010 | Spic de Grâu București | 1–1 (5–2 p) | Concordia Chiajna II |

Spic de Grâu București won Liga IV București and qualify to promotion play-off in Liga III.

=== Buzău County ===
Series I

| Pos | Team | Pld | W | D | L | GF | GA | GD | Pts | Qualification or relegation |
|---|---|---|---|---|---|---|---|---|---|---|
| 1 | ABC Stoicescu (Q) | 30 | 24 | 5 | 1 | 139 | 39 | +100 | 77 | Qualification to championship play-off |
| 2 | Recolta Cislău (Q) | 30 | 22 | 3 | 5 | 80 | 30 | +50 | 69 | Qualification to championship play-off |
| 3 | Șoimii Siriu | 30 | 17 | 7 | 6 | 66 | 43 | +23 | 58 | |
| 4 | Millenium C.A. Rosetti | 30 | 17 | 5 | 8 | 72 | 59 | +13 | 56 | |
| 5 | Cereanim Smeeni | 30 | 14 | 8 | 8 | 64 | 36 | +28 | 50 | |
| 6 | Șoimii Costești | 30 | 14 | 7 | 9 | 55 | 61 | −6 | 49 | |
| 7 | Voința Limpeziș | 30 | 13 | 3 | 14 | 72 | 74 | −2 | 42 | |
| 8 | Voința Florica | 30 | 12 | 5 | 13 | 54 | 49 | +5 | 41 | |
| 9 | Montana Pătârlagele | 30 | 12 | 4 | 14 | 59 | 31 | +28 | 40 | |
| 10 | Viitorul Tisău | 30 | 11 | 5 | 14 | 56 | 73 | −17 | 38 | |
| 11 | Viitorul Vernești | 30 | 10 | 5 | 15 | 58 | 64 | −6 | 35 | |
| 12 | Unirea Stâlpu | 30 | 10 | 4 | 16 | 51 | 83 | −32 | 34 | |
| 13 | Steaua Săhăteni | 30 | 8 | 5 | 17 | 51 | 87 | −36 | 29 | |
| 14 | Foresta Nehoiu | 30 | 7 | 5 | 18 | 52 | 97 | −45 | 26 | |
| 15 | Olimpia Pogoanele | 30 | 6 | 5 | 19 | 57 | 104 | −47 | 23 | |
| 16 | Astra Glodeanu Sărat | 30 | 3 | 4 | 23 | 36 | 102 | −66 | 13 | |

Rules for classification: 1) Points; 2) Head-to-head points; 3) Head-to-head goal difference; 4) Head-to-head goals scored; 5) Head-to-head away goals scored; 6) Goal difference; 7) Goals scored.
(Q) Qualified for the phase indicated

Series II

| Pos | Team | Pld | W | D | L | GF | GA | GD | Pts | Qualification or relegation |
|---|---|---|---|---|---|---|---|---|---|---|
| 1 | Voința Lanurile (Q) | 28 | 21 | 5 | 2 | 87 | 22 | +65 | 68 | Qualification to championship play-off |
| 2 | Locomotiva Buzău (Q) | 28 | 20 | 5 | 3 | 98 | 28 | +70 | 65 | Qualification to championship play-off |
| 3 | Recolta Boldu | 28 | 20 | 5 | 3 | 80 | 32 | +48 | 65 | |
| 4 | Metalul Buzău | 28 | 18 | 3 | 7 | 95 | 43 | +52 | 57 | |
| 5 | Unirea Mărăcineni | 28 | 17 | 4 | 7 | 69 | 39 | +30 | 55 | |
| 6 | Tricolorul Gălbinași | 28 | 13 | 6 | 9 | 62 | 58 | +4 | 45 | |
| 7 | ASA B3 Mărăcineni | 28 | 12 | 5 | 11 | 59 | 36 | +23 | 41 | |
| 8 | Spartac Poșta Câlnău | 28 | 10 | 4 | 14 | 57 | 66 | −9 | 34 | |
| 9 | Gloria Vadu Pașii | 28 | 8 | 5 | 15 | 31 | 80 | −49 | 29 | |
| 10 | Valconf Valea Râmnicului | 28 | 7 | 7 | 14 | 41 | 63 | −22 | 28 | |
| 11 | Înfrățirea Zoița | 28 | 8 | 3 | 17 | 33 | 69 | −36 | 27 | |
| 12 | Victoria Boboc | 28 | 5 | 9 | 14 | 48 | 68 | −20 | 24 | |
| 13 | Luceafărul Maxenu | 28 | 6 | 3 | 19 | 20 | 69 | −49 | 21 | |
| 14 | Com Săgeata | 28 | 5 | 3 | 20 | 29 | 93 | −64 | 18 | |
| 15 | Libertatea Bălăceanu | 28 | 3 | 7 | 18 | 36 | 89 | −53 | 16 | |

Rules for classification: 1) Points; 2) Head-to-head points; 3) Head-to-head goal difference; 4) Head-to-head goals scored; 5) Head-to-head away goals scored; 6) Goal difference; 7) Goals scored.
(Q) Qualified for the phase indicated

Championship play-off

The championship play-off played between the best two ranked teams in each series of the regular season.

Semi-finals

| Team 1 | Score | Team 2 |
|---|---|---|
| ABC Stoicescu | 1–2 | Locomotiva Buzău |
| Voința Lanurile | 1–4 | Recolta Cislău |

Final

The championship final was played on 9 June 2010 at Petrolul Stadium in Berca.

| Team 1 | Score | Team 2 |
|---|---|---|
| Recolta Cislău | 2–0 | Locomotiva Buzău |

Recolta Cislău won the Liga IV Buzău County. ABC Stoicescu qualify to promotion play-off in Liga III because was the only team from play-off that have C.I.S. (Sports Identity Certificate) issued by the Ministry of Youth and Sports required to play in Liga III.

=== Caraș-Severin County ===
| Pos | Team | Pld | W | D | L | GF | GA | GD | Pts | Qualification or relegation |
|---|---|---|---|---|---|---|---|---|---|---|
| 1 | Autocatania Caransebeș (C, Q) | 32 | 26 | 3 | 3 | 115 | 21 | +94 | 81 | Qualification to promotion play-off |
| 2 | Voința Lupac | 32 | 23 | 4 | 5 | 123 | 35 | +88 | 73 | |
| 3 | Gloria Reșița | 32 | 23 | 4 | 5 | 92 | 38 | +54 | 73 | |
| 4 | Scorilo Caransebeș | 32 | 19 | 4 | 9 | 62 | 35 | +27 | 61 | |
| 5 | Metalul Bocșa | 32 | 20 | 1 | 11 | 68 | 55 | +13 | 61 | |
| 6 | Moldo-Forest Moldova Nouă | 32 | 17 | 5 | 10 | 75 | 36 | +39 | 56 | |
| 7 | Berzasca | 32 | 15 | 5 | 12 | 67 | 56 | +11 | 50 | |
| 8 | Minerul Anina | 32 | 13 | 6 | 13 | 53 | 58 | −5 | 45 | |
| 9 | Nera Bozovici | 32 | 12 | 7 | 13 | 53 | 47 | +6 | 43 | |
| 10 | Metalul Oțelu Roșu | 32 | 12 | 4 | 16 | 62 | 60 | +2 | 40 | |
| 11 | Bistra Glimboca | 32 | 11 | 4 | 17 | 49 | 59 | −10 | 37 | |
| 12 | Prolaz Karasevo | 32 | 12 | 1 | 19 | 54 | 70 | −16 | 37 | |
| 13 | Negrea Reșița | 32 | 9 | 5 | 18 | 41 | 89 | −48 | 32 | |
| 14 | Oravița | 32 | 9 | 1 | 22 | 57 | 107 | −50 | 28 | |
| 15 | Arsenal Reșița | 32 | 8 | 4 | 20 | 41 | 96 | −55 | 28 | |
| 16 | Hercules Băile Herculane | 32 | 7 | 0 | 25 | 44 | 100 | −56 | 21 | |
| 17 | Minerul Dognecea (R) | 32 | 6 | 2 | 24 | 41 | 135 | −94 | 20 | Relegation to Liga V Caraș-Severin |

Rules for classification: 1) Points; 2) Head-to-head points; 3) Head-to-head goal difference; 4) Head-to-head goals scored; 5) Head-to-head away goals scored; 6) Goal difference; 7) Goals scored.
(C) Champions; (Q) Qualified for the phase indicated; (R) Relegated

=== Călărași County ===
East Series

| Pos | Team | Pld | W | D | L | GF | GA | GD | Pts | Qualification or relegation |
|---|---|---|---|---|---|---|---|---|---|---|
| 1 | Phoenix Ulmu (Q) | 24 | 22 | 2 | 0 | 93 | 12 | +81 | 68 | Qualification to championship play-off |
| 2 | Spicul Roseți (Q) | 24 | 20 | 1 | 3 | 66 | 17 | +49 | 61 | Qualification to championship play-off |
| 3 | Venus Independența | 24 | 17 | 1 | 6 | 77 | 36 | +41 | 52 | |
| 4 | Dunărea Ciocănești | 24 | 16 | 2 | 6 | 54 | 25 | +29 | 50 | |
| 5 | Victoria Lehliu | 24 | 12 | 4 | 8 | 54 | 31 | +23 | 40 | |
| 6 | Zarea Cuza Vodă | 24 | 10 | 3 | 11 | 46 | 53 | −7 | 33 | |
| 7 | Victoria Dragoș Vodă | 24 | 9 | 2 | 13 | 29 | 46 | −17 | 29 | |
| 8 | Agricola Borcea | 24 | 9 | 1 | 14 | 44 | 59 | −15 | 28 | |
| 9 | Unirea Dragalina | 24 | 7 | 3 | 14 | 40 | 56 | −16 | 24 | |
| 10 | Dunărea Grădiștea | 24 | 6 | 3 | 15 | 44 | 63 | −19 | 21 | |
| 11 | Avântul Dor Mărunt | 24 | 5 | 3 | 16 | 26 | 77 | −51 | 18 | |
| 12 | Avântul Pietroiu | 24 | 4 | 4 | 16 | 26 | 76 | −50 | 16 | |
| 13 | Conpet Ștefan cel Mare (R) | 24 | 3 | 3 | 18 | 37 | 100 | −63 | 12 | Relegation to Liga V Călărași |

Rules for classification: 1) Points; 2) Head-to-head points; 3) Head-to-head goal difference; 4) Head-to-head goals scored; 5) Head-to-head away goals scored; 6) Goal difference; 7) Goals scored.
(Q) Qualified for the phase indicated; (R) Relegated

West Series

| Pos | Team | Pld | W | D | L | GF | GA | GD | Pts | Qualification or relegation |
|---|---|---|---|---|---|---|---|---|---|---|
| 1 | Progresul Fundulea (Q) | 26 | 19 | 3 | 4 | 69 | 32 | +37 | 60 | Qualification to championship play-off |
| 2 | Mânăstirea (Q) | 26 | 15 | 5 | 6 | 66 | 36 | +30 | 50 | Qualification to championship play-off |
| 3 | Gălbinași | 26 | 15 | 5 | 6 | 62 | 43 | +19 | 50 | |
| 4 | Steaua Radovanu | 26 | 15 | 4 | 7 | 72 | 40 | +32 | 49 | |
| 5 | Dinamo Sărulești | 26 | 14 | 4 | 8 | 58 | 52 | +6 | 46 | |
| 6 | Petrolul Ileana | 26 | 12 | 4 | 10 | 58 | 52 | +6 | 40 | |
| 7 | Rapid Ulmeni | 26 | 12 | 2 | 12 | 57 | 56 | +1 | 38 | |
| 8 | Curcani | 26 | 11 | 3 | 12 | 58 | 56 | +2 | 36 | |
| 9 | Fortuna Tămădău | 26 | 9 | 6 | 11 | 45 | 42 | +3 | 33 | |
| 10 | Avântul Luica | 26 | 9 | 1 | 16 | 55 | 88 | −33 | 28 | |
| 11 | Budești | 26 | 8 | 1 | 17 | 44 | 74 | −30 | 25 | |
| 12 | Unirea Spanțov | 26 | 7 | 3 | 16 | 44 | 67 | −23 | 24 | |
| 13 | Gloria Fundeni (R) | 26 | 6 | 4 | 16 | 30 | 55 | −25 | 22 | Relegation to Liga V Călărași |
| 14 | Viitorul Șoldanu (R) | 26 | 6 | 1 | 19 | 41 | 67 | −26 | 19 | Relegation to Liga V Călărași |

Rules for classification: 1) Points; 2) Head-to-head points; 3) Head-to-head goal difference; 4) Head-to-head goals scored; 5) Head-to-head away goals scored; 6) Goal difference; 7) Goals scored.
(Q) Qualified for the phase indicated; (R) Relegated

Championship play-off

The championship play-off was played between the first two ranked teams in each series of the regular season.

Semi-finals

| Team 1 | Agg. | Team 2 | 1st leg | 2nd leg |
|---|---|---|---|---|
| Phoenix Ulmu | 5–2 | Mânăstirea | 4–1 | 1–1 |
| Progresul Fundulea | 1–2 | Spicul Roseți | 0–1 | 1–1 |

Final

The championship final was played on 5 June 2010 at Ion Comșa Stadium in Călărași.

| Team 1 | Score | Team 2 |
|---|---|---|
| Phoenix Ulmu | 2–1 | Spicul Roseți |

Phoenix Ulmu won the Liga IV Călărași County and qualify to promotion play-off in Liga III.

=== Cluj County ===
| Pos | Team | Pld | W | D | L | GF | GA | GD | Pts | Qualification or relegation |
|---|---|---|---|---|---|---|---|---|---|---|
| 1 | Unirea Florești (C, Q) | 32 | 27 | 5 | 0 | 118 | 20 | +98 | 86 | Qualification to promotion play-off |
| 2 | Feleacu | 32 | 24 | 5 | 3 | 112 | 29 | +83 | 77 | |
| 3 | Arieșul Mihai Viteazu | 32 | 22 | 3 | 7 | 104 | 36 | +68 | 69 | |
| 4 | Atletic Olimpia Gherla | 32 | 20 | 3 | 9 | 82 | 34 | +48 | 63 | |
| 5 | Vulturii Vultureni | 32 | 18 | 5 | 9 | 79 | 38 | +41 | 59 | |
| 6 | Leii Tritenii de Jos | 32 | 18 | 5 | 9 | 75 | 50 | +25 | 59 | |
| 7 | Unirea Jucu | 32 | 16 | 2 | 14 | 53 | 55 | −2 | 50 | |
| 8 | Ardealul Cluj | 32 | 15 | 3 | 14 | 89 | 64 | +25 | 48 | |
| 9 | Minerul Iara | 32 | 14 | 4 | 14 | 83 | 78 | +5 | 46 | |
| 10 | Someșul Gilău | 32 | 12 | 9 | 11 | 59 | 66 | −7 | 45 | |
| 11 | Vulturul Mintiu Gherlii | 32 | 11 | 3 | 18 | 60 | 74 | −14 | 36 | |
| 12 | Seso Cîmpia Turzii II | 32 | 9 | 8 | 15 | 50 | 64 | −14 | 35 | |
| 13 | Avântul Recea Cristur | 32 | 11 | 2 | 19 | 79 | 121 | −42 | 35 | |
| 14 | Unirea Tritenii de Jos | 32 | 8 | 3 | 21 | 53 | 117 | −64 | 27 | |
| 15 | CFR Dej | 32 | 6 | 0 | 26 | 38 | 138 | −100 | 18 | |
| 16 | Arieșul Turda II (R) | 32 | 5 | 1 | 26 | 54 | 91 | −37 | 16 (Note: Arieșul Turda II withdrew from championship during winter break and lost all remaining matches with 0–3.) | Relegation to Liga V Cluj |
| 17 | Minerul Ocna Dej (R) | 32 | 4 | 3 | 25 | 32 | 145 | −113 | 15 | Relegation to Liga V Cluj |
| 18 | Vlădeasa Huedin (D) | 0 | 0 | 0 | 0 | 0 | 0 | 0 | 0 (Note: Vlădeasa Huedin withdrew in the first part of the season and all its results were canceled.) | Expelled |

Rules for classification: 1) Points; 2) Head-to-head points; 3) Head-to-head goal difference; 4) Head-to-head goals scored; 5) Head-to-head away goals scored; 6) Goal difference; 7) Goals scored.
(C) Champions; (D) Disqualified; (Q) Qualified for the phase indicated; (R) Relegated

=== Constanța County ===
East Series

| Pos | Team | Pld | W | D | L | GF | GA | GD | Pts | Qualification |
|---|---|---|---|---|---|---|---|---|---|---|
| 1 | GSIB Mangalia | 22 | 18 | 3 | 1 | 72 | 18 | +54 | 57 | Qualification to championship play-off |
| 2 | Ovidiu | 22 | 16 | 2 | 4 | 98 | 34 | +64 | 50 | Qualification to championship play-off |
| 3 | Portul Constanța | 22 | 15 | 4 | 3 | 74 | 21 | +53 | 49 | Qualification to championship play-off |
| 4 | Victoria Cumpăna | 22 | 11 | 5 | 6 | 53 | 37 | +16 | 38 | Qualification to championship play-off |
| 5 | Gloria Albești | 22 | 11 | 2 | 9 | 57 | 38 | +19 | 35 | Qualification to championship play-off |
| 6 | Farul Tuzla | 22 | 10 | 4 | 8 | 45 | 50 | −5 | 34 | Qualification to championship play-off |
| 7 | Elpis Constanța | 22 | 8 | 7 | 7 | 33 | 23 | +10 | 31 | Qualification to championship play-out |
| 8 | Sparta Techirghiol | 22 | 7 | 4 | 11 | 41 | 65 | −24 | 25 | Qualification to championship play-out |
| 9 | Cariocas Constanța | 22 | 5 | 2 | 15 | 35 | 62 | −27 | 17 | Qualification to championship play-out |
| 10 | Viitorul Pecineaga | 22 | 5 | 1 | 16 | 44 | 78 | −34 | 16 | Qualification to championship play-out |
| 11 | Aurora 23 August | 22 | 4 | 2 | 16 | 30 | 88 | −58 | 14 | Qualification to championship play-out |
| 12 | Înfrățirea Cogealac | 22 | 4 | 0 | 18 | 25 | 93 | −68 | 12 | Qualification to championship play-out |

Rules for classification: 1) Points; 2) Head-to-head points; 3) Head-to-head goal difference; 4) Head-to-head goals scored; 5) Head-to-head away goals scored; 6) Goal difference; 7) Goals scored.

West Series

| Pos | Team | Pld | W | D | L | GF | GA | GD | Pts | Qualification |
|---|---|---|---|---|---|---|---|---|---|---|
| 1 | Peștera | 22 | 19 | 2 | 1 | 68 | 9 | +59 | 59 | Qualification to championship play-off |
| 2 | Dunărea Ostrov-Rasova | 22 | 17 | 3 | 2 | 72 | 17 | +55 | 54 | Qualification to championship play-off |
| 3 | Gloria Băneasa | 22 | 11 | 2 | 9 | 54 | 48 | +6 | 35 | Qualification to championship play-off |
| 4 | Perla Murfatlar | 22 | 9 | 5 | 8 | 49 | 47 | +2 | 32 | Qualification to championship play-off |
| 5 | Știința Poarta Albă | 22 | 9 | 4 | 9 | 41 | 44 | −3 | 31 | Qualification to championship play-off |
| 6 | Carsium Hârșova | 22 | 9 | 3 | 10 | 52 | 69 | −17 | 30 | Qualification to championship play-off |
| 7 | Mihail Kogălniceanu | 22 | 8 | 4 | 10 | 43 | 49 | −6 | 28 | Qualification to championship play-out |
| 8 | Axiopolis Cernavodă | 22 | 8 | 4 | 10 | 36 | 36 | 0 | 28 | Qualification to championship play-out |
| 9 | Sport Prim Oltina | 22 | 8 | 2 | 12 | 43 | 59 | −16 | 26 | Qualification to championship play-out |
| 10 | Viitorul Nisipari | 22 | 6 | 3 | 13 | 43 | 60 | −17 | 21 | Qualification to championship play-out |
| 11 | Dacia Mircea Vodă | 22 | 5 | 2 | 15 | 26 | 56 | −30 | 17 | Qualification to championship play-out |
| 12 | Dunărea Ciobanu | 22 | 5 | 2 | 15 | 33 | 66 | −33 | 17 | Qualification to championship play-out |

Rules for classification: 1) Points; 2) Head-to-head points; 3) Head-to-head goal difference; 4) Head-to-head goals scored; 5) Head-to-head away goals scored; 6) Goal difference; 7) Goals scored.

Championship play-off

The teams started the play-off with all the records achieved in the regular season against the other qualified teams from series and played only against the teams from the other series.

| Pos | Team | Pld | W | D | L | GF | GA | GD | Pts | Qualification |
|---|---|---|---|---|---|---|---|---|---|---|
| 1 | Peștera (C, Q) | 22 | 18 | 3 | 1 | 69 | 10 | +59 | 57 | Qualification to promotion play-off |
| 2 | GSIB Mangalia | 22 | 18 | 2 | 2 | 83 | 31 | +52 | 56 | |
| 3 | Ovidiu | 22 | 11 | 4 | 7 | 64 | 40 | +24 | 37 | |
| 4 | Portul Constanța | 22 | 11 | 4 | 7 | 48 | 33 | +15 | 37 | |
| 5 | Dunărea Ostrov-Rasova | 22 | 10 | 6 | 6 | 50 | 44 | +6 | 36 | |
| 6 | Perla Murfatlar | 22 | 9 | 2 | 11 | 57 | 60 | −3 | 29 | |
| 7 | Gloria Albești | 22 | 7 | 4 | 11 | 44 | 46 | −2 | 25 | |
| 8 | Victoria Cumpăna | 21 | 7 | 3 | 11 | 38 | 58 | −20 | 24 | |
| 9 | Farul Tuzla | 22 | 6 | 4 | 12 | 34 | 72 | −38 | 22 | |
| 10 | Gloria Băneasa | 22 | 5 | 2 | 15 | 36 | 54 | −18 | 17 | |
| 11 | Știința Poarta Albă | 21 | 5 | 2 | 14 | 31 | 62 | −31 | 17 | |
| 12 | Carsium Hârșova | 22 | 4 | 4 | 14 | 35 | 79 | −44 | 16 | |

Rules for classification: 1) Points; 2) Head-to-head points; 3) Head-to-head goal difference; 4) Head-to-head goals scored; 5) Head-to-head away goals scored; 6) Goal difference; 7) Goals scored.
(C) Champions; (Q) Qualified for the phase indicated

Championship play-out

The teams started the play-out with all the records achieved in the regular season against the other qualified teams from series and played only against the teams from the other series.

| Pos | Team | Pld | W | D | L | GF | GA | GD | Pts | Relegation |
|---|---|---|---|---|---|---|---|---|---|---|
| 13 | Elpis Constanța | 22 | 14 | 4 | 4 | 55 | 20 | +35 | 46 | |
| 14 | Sport Prim Oltina | 22 | 13 | 2 | 7 | 55 | 35 | +20 | 41 | |
| 15 | Sparta Techirghiol | 22 | 12 | 4 | 6 | 61 | 51 | +10 | 40 | |
| 16 | Mihail Kogălniceanu | 22 | 12 | 3 | 7 | 52 | 37 | +15 | 39 | |
| 17 | Axiopolis Cernavodă | 22 | 12 | 1 | 9 | 48 | 36 | +12 | 37 | |
| 18 | Dacia Mircea Vodă | 22 | 11 | 4 | 7 | 41 | 33 | +8 | 37 | |
| 19 | Aurora 23 August | 22 | 8 | 3 | 11 | 35 | 55 | −20 | 27 | |
| 20 | Dunărea Ciobanu | 22 | 8 | 2 | 12 | 42 | 52 | −10 | 26 | |
| 21 | Viitorul Nisipari | 22 | 8 | 4 | 10 | 47 | 52 | −5 | 28 | |
| 22 | Cariocas Constanța (R) | 22 | 7 | 5 | 10 | 47 | 51 | −4 | 26 | Relegation to Liga V Constanța |
| 23 | Viitorul Pecineaga (R) | 22 | 8 | 0 | 14 | 53 | 57 | −4 | 24 | Relegation to Liga V Constanța |
| 24 | Înfrățirea Cogealac (R) | 22 | 3 | 0 | 19 | 14 | 71 | −57 | 9 (Note: Înfrățirea Cogealac withdrew from the championship play-out and lost all matches with 0–3.) | Relegation to Liga V Constanța |

Rules for classification: 1) Points; 2) Head-to-head points; 3) Head-to-head goal difference; 4) Head-to-head goals scored; 5) Head-to-head away goals scored; 6) Goal difference; 7) Goals scored.
(R) Relegated

=== Covasna County ===
| Pos | Team | Pld | W | D | L | GF | GA | GD | Pts | Qualification or relegation |
|---|---|---|---|---|---|---|---|---|---|---|
| 1 | Zagon (C, Q) | 30 | 27 | 3 | 0 | 137 | 18 | +119 | 84 | Qualification to promotion play-off |
| 2 | Ojdula | 30 | 19 | 6 | 5 | 67 | 33 | +34 | 63 | |
| 3 | Stăruința Bodoc | 30 | 19 | 2 | 9 | 93 | 50 | +43 | 59 | |
| 4 | Prima Brăduț | 30 | 17 | 3 | 10 | 70 | 37 | +33 | 54 | |
| 5 | Nemere Ghelința | 30 | 16 | 6 | 8 | 66 | 39 | +27 | 54 | |
| 6 | Brețcu | 30 | 15 | 7 | 8 | 79 | 44 | +35 | 52 | |
| 7 | Păpăuți | 30 | 16 | 2 | 12 | 85 | 50 | +35 | 50 | |
| 8 | Perkő Sânzieni | 30 | 16 | 2 | 12 | 46 | 39 | +7 | 50 | |
| 9 | Viitorul Sfântu Gheorghe | 30 | 13 | 4 | 13 | 49 | 62 | −13 | 43 | |
| 10 | Dozsa Dalnic | 30 | 10 | 2 | 18 | 51 | 75 | −24 | 32 | |
| 11 | Avântul Ilieni | 30 | 8 | 7 | 15 | 57 | 83 | −26 | 31 | |
| 12 | Baraolt | 30 | 9 | 3 | 18 | 55 | 78 | −23 | 30 | |
| 13 | BSE Belin | 30 | 7 | 5 | 18 | 37 | 89 | −52 | 26 | |
| 14 | Progresul Sita Buzăului | 30 | 8 | 2 | 20 | 50 | 94 | −44 | 26 | |
| 15 | Spartacus Hăghig (R) | 30 | 7 | 1 | 22 | 50 | 124 | −74 | 22 | Relegation to Liga V Covasna |
| 16 | KSE Târgu Secuiesc (R) | 30 | 4 | 3 | 23 | 30 | 129 | −99 | 15 | Relegation to Liga V Covasna |

Rules for classification: 1) Points; 2) Head-to-head points; 3) Head-to-head goal difference; 4) Head-to-head goals scored; 5) Head-to-head away goals scored; 6) Goal difference; 7) Goals scored.
(C) Champions; (Q) Qualified for the phase indicated; (R) Relegated

=== Dâmbovița County ===
| Pos | Team | Pld | W | D | L | GF | GA | GD | Pts | Qualification or relegation |
|---|---|---|---|---|---|---|---|---|---|---|
| 1 | Gloria Cornești (C, Q) | 34 | 31 | 1 | 2 | 150 | 28 | +122 | 94 | Qualification to promotion play-off |
| 2 | Petrolul Târgoviște | 34 | 25 | 2 | 7 | 100 | 45 | +55 | 77 | |
| 3 | Gaz Metan Finta | 34 | 21 | 1 | 12 | 101 | 69 | +32 | 63 (Note: Gaz Metan Finta, Flacăra Moreni and Tisenmetal Colibași deducted with 1 point each.) | |
| 4 | FCM Târgoviște III | 34 | 19 | 3 | 12 | 74 | 59 | +15 | 60 | |
| 5 | Voința Perșinari | 34 | 17 | 5 | 12 | 79 | 65 | +14 | 56 | |
| 6 | Flacăra Moreni | 34 | 17 | 5 | 12 | 102 | 57 | +45 | 55 | |
| 7 | Voința Potlogi (R) | 33 | 17 | 2 | 14 | 62 | 56 | +6 | 53 (Note: Voința Potlogi and Recolta Crovu withdrew in the second part of the season and lost all remaining matches with 0–3.) | Relegation to Liga V Dâmbovița |
| 8 | Potlogi | 34 | 14 | 8 | 12 | 59 | 63 | −4 | 50 | |
| 9 | Luceafărul Dărmănești | 34 | 15 | 4 | 15 | 65 | 73 | −8 | 49 | |
| 10 | Atletic Fieni | 34 | 14 | 5 | 15 | 77 | 68 | +9 | 47 | |
| 11 | Doicești | 34 | 13 | 8 | 13 | 58 | 63 | −5 | 47 | |
| 12 | Comerțul Viișoara | 34 | 12 | 8 | 14 | 50 | 55 | −5 | 44 | |
| 13 | Tisenmetal Colibași | 34 | 13 | 5 | 16 | 49 | 49 | 0 | 43 | |
| 14 | GSA Nucet | 34 | 12 | 5 | 17 | 55 | 61 | −6 | 41 | |
| 15 | Unirea Cobia | 34 | 8 | 6 | 20 | 56 | 103 | −47 | 30 | |
| 16 | Rapid Gemenea | 34 | 9 | 2 | 23 | 46 | 130 | −84 | 29 | |
| 17 | Răcari (R) | 34 | 6 | 2 | 26 | 49 | 122 | −73 | 20 | Relegation to Liga V Dâmbovița |
| 18 | Recolta Crovu (R) | 33 | 5 | 2 | 26 | 38 | 105 | −67 | 17 | Relegation to Liga V Dâmbovița |

Rules for classification: 1) Points; 2) Head-to-head points; 3) Head-to-head goal difference; 4) Head-to-head goals scored; 5) Head-to-head away goals scored; 6) Goal difference; 7) Goals scored.
(C) Champions; (Q) Qualified for the phase indicated; (R) Relegated

=== Dolj County ===
| Pos | Team | Pld | W | D | L | GF | GA | GD | Pts |
|---|---|---|---|---|---|---|---|---|---|
| 1 | CS Sopot | 28 | 24 | 1 | 3 | 83 | 19 | +64 | 73 |
| 2 | Dunărea Calafat | 29 | 22 | 2 | 5 | 86 | 21 | +65 | 68 |
| 3 | CS Ișalnița | 28 | 20 | 4 | 4 | 70 | 24 | +46 | 64 |
| 4 | Recolta Ostroveni | 28 | 14 | 6 | 8 | 61 | 42 | +19 | 48 |
| 5 | Avântul Pielești | 28 | 14 | 5 | 9 | 46 | 45 | +1 | 47 |
| 6 | Viitorul Cârcea | 28 | 14 | 3 | 11 | 56 | 45 | +11 | 45 |
| 7 | Petrom Chimia | 28 | 13 | 4 | 11 | 84 | 53 | +31 | 43 |
| 8 | Progresul Segarcea | 29 | 13 | 2 | 14 | 53 | 40 | +13 | 41 |
| 9 | UT Dăbuleni | 28 | 8 | 8 | 12 | 51 | 69 | −18 | 32 |
| 10 | FC Brădești | 28 | 9 | 3 | 16 | 33 | 71 | −38 | 30 |
| 11 | Jiu Gângiova | 28 | 8 | 5 | 15 | 43 | 61 | −18 | 29 |
| 12 | Dunărea Bechet | 28 | 9 | 2 | 17 | 41 | 78 | −37 | 29 |
| 13 | Energia Craiova | 28 | 7 | 5 | 16 | 37 | 59 | −22 | 26 |
| 14 | FC Leamna | 28 | 7 | 5 | 16 | 55 | 98 | −43 | 26 |
| 15 | GP Craiova | 29 | 8 | 1 | 20 | 33 | 66 | −33 | 25 |
| 16 | Progresul Băilești | 29 | 7 | 2 | 20 | 42 | 83 | −41 | 23 |

=== Galați County ===
| Pos | Team | Pld | W | D | L | GF | GA | GD | Pts | Qualification or relegation |
|---|---|---|---|---|---|---|---|---|---|---|
| 1 | Avântul Vânatori (C, Q) | 22 | 16 | 3 | 3 | 63 | 18 | +45 | 51 | Qualification to promotion play-off |
| 2 | Foresta Șendreni | 22 | 15 | 1 | 6 | 61 | 30 | +31 | 46 | |
| 3 | Fulgerul Smulți | 22 | 13 | 4 | 5 | 77 | 45 | +32 | 43 | |
| 4 | CSȘ Tecuci | 22 | 12 | 3 | 7 | 60 | 41 | +19 | 39 | |
| 5 | Muncitorul Ghidigeni | 22 | 10 | 3 | 9 | 55 | 43 | +12 | 33 | |
| 6 | Voința Șivița | 22 | 10 | 3 | 9 | 49 | 50 | −1 | 33 | |
| 7 | Bujorii Târgu Bujor | 22 | 9 | 4 | 9 | 39 | 50 | −11 | 31 | |
| 8 | Unirea Hanu Conachi | 22 | 8 | 3 | 11 | 39 | 50 | −11 | 27 | |
| 9 | Gloria Ivești | 22 | 7 | 3 | 12 | 46 | 74 | −28 | 24 | |
| 10 | Frontiera Galați | 22 | 6 | 4 | 12 | 38 | 62 | −24 | 22 | |
| 11 | Metalul Toflea | 22 | 5 | 2 | 15 | 36 | 72 | −36 | 17 (Note: Metalul Toflea and Imperfect Braniștea was spared from relegation due to the expansion of the league from twelve to fourteen teams.) | Spared from relegation |
| 12 | Imperfect Braniștea | 22 | 3 | 3 | 16 | 36 | 64 | −28 | 12 | Spared from relegation |

Rules for classification: 1) Points; 2) Head-to-head points; 3) Head-to-head goal difference; 4) Head-to-head goals scored; 5) Head-to-head away goals scored; 6) Goal difference; 7) Goals scored.
(C) Champions; (Q) Qualified for the phase indicated

=== Giurgiu County ===
| Pos | Team | Pld | W | D | L | GF | GA | GD | Pts | Qualification or relegation |
|---|---|---|---|---|---|---|---|---|---|---|
| 1 | Nova Force Giurgiu (Q) | 38 | 29 | 4 | 5 | 148 | 52 | +96 | 91 | Qualification to championship play-off |
| 2 | Unirea Izvoarele (Q) | 38 | 28 | 4 | 6 | 144 | 49 | +95 | 88 | Qualification to championship play-off |
| 3 | Dragonii Ogrezeni (Q) | 38 | 28 | 2 | 8 | 132 | 60 | +72 | 86 | Qualification to championship play-off |
| 4 | Bolintin-Vale (Q) | 38 | 26 | 4 | 8 | 158 | 60 | +98 | 82 | Qualification to championship play-off |
| 5 | Avântul Putineiu | 38 | 23 | 5 | 10 | 122 | 71 | +51 | 74 | |
| 6 | Unirea Ghimpați | 38 | 22 | 6 | 10 | 99 | 40 | +59 | 72 | |
| 7 | Prundu | 38 | 22 | 4 | 12 | 124 | 95 | +29 | 70 | |
| 8 | Scărișoara | 38 | 21 | 3 | 14 | 100 | 74 | +26 | 66 | |
| 9 | Avântul Florești | 38 | 18 | 3 | 17 | 89 | 87 | +2 | 57 | |
| 10 | Dunărea Oinacu | 38 | 15 | 3 | 20 | 63 | 83 | −20 | 48 | |
| 11 | Constructorul Malu Spart | 38 | 12 | 9 | 17 | 64 | 90 | −26 | 45 | |
| 12 | Unirea Vânători | 38 | 13 | 4 | 21 | 61 | 86 | −25 | 43 | |
| 13 | Silver Inter Zorile | 38 | 12 | 5 | 21 | 70 | 90 | −20 | 41 | |
| 14 | Voința Slobozia | 38 | 12 | 4 | 22 | 80 | 120 | −40 | 40 | |
| 15 | Naipu | 38 | 12 | 6 | 20 | 67 | 97 | −30 | 39 (Note: Naipu has been deducted 3 points for leaving the pitch.) | |
| 16 | Olimpia Bălășoieni | 38 | 12 | 2 | 24 | 52 | 105 | −53 | 38 | |
| 17 | Singureni | 38 | 10 | 4 | 24 | 81 | 145 | −64 | 34 | |
| 18 | Constructorul Bolintin-Deal | 38 | 11 | 1 | 26 | 66 | 132 | −66 | 34 (Note: Spared from relegation due to the expansion of the league from twenty to twenty two teams.) | Spared from relegation |
| 19 | Real Vărăști | 38 | 9 | 5 | 24 | 61 | 144 | −83 | 32 | Spared from relegation |
| 20 | Viitorul Vedea | 38 | 5 | 2 | 31 | 52 | 139 | −87 | 17 | Spared from relegation |

Rules for classification: 1) Points; 2) Head-to-head points; 3) Head-to-head goal difference; 4) Head-to-head goals scored; 5) Head-to-head away goals scored; 6) Goal difference; 7) Goals scored.
(Q) Qualified for the phase indicated
Notes:

Championship play-off

The championship play-off played between the best four ranked team in the regular season. All matches were played at Dunărea-Port Stadium on 2 June (semi-finals) and 5 June 2010 (final).

Semi-finals

| Team 1 | Score | Team 2 |
|---|---|---|
| Nova Force Giurgiu | 6–0 | Dragonii Ogrezeni |
| Unirea Izvoarele | 2–2 (a.e.t.) (5–6 p) | Bolintin-Vale |

Final

| Team 1 | Score | Team 2 |
|---|---|---|
| Nova Force Giurgiu | 2–1 (a.e.t.) | Bolintin-Vale |

Nova Force Giurgiu won the Liga IV Giurgiu County and qualify to promotion play-off in Liga III.

=== Gorj County ===
| Pos | Team | Pld | W | D | L | GF | GA | GD | Pts | Qualification or relegation |
|---|---|---|---|---|---|---|---|---|---|---|
| 1 | Petrolul Țicleni (C, Q) | 32 | 25 | 5 | 2 | 104 | 30 | +74 | 80 | Qualification to promotion play-off |
| 2 | Știința Turceni | 32 | 24 | 5 | 3 | 89 | 34 | +55 | 77 | |
| 3 | Unirea Crușeț | 32 | 23 | 4 | 5 | 90 | 33 | +57 | 73 | |
| 4 | Universitatea Târgu Jiu | 32 | 19 | 7 | 6 | 91 | 39 | +52 | 64 | |
| 5 | Minerul II Mătăsari | 32 | 19 | 5 | 8 | 64 | 28 | +36 | 62 | |
| 6 | Parângul Sadu | 32 | 15 | 7 | 10 | 69 | 57 | +12 | 52 | |
| 7 | Dinamo Stănești | 32 | 14 | 8 | 10 | 45 | 48 | −3 | 50 | |
| 8 | Avântul Baia de Fier | 32 | 15 | 4 | 13 | 71 | 52 | +19 | 49 | |
| 9 | Știința Ceplea | 32 | 12 | 8 | 12 | 71 | 65 | +6 | 44 | |
| 10 | Vulturii Fărcășești | 32 | 11 | 7 | 14 | 56 | 65 | −9 | 40 | |
| 11 | Energetica Tismana | 32 | 12 | 3 | 17 | 54 | 68 | −14 | 39 | |
| 12 | Viitorul Negomir | 32 | 11 | 5 | 16 | 55 | 77 | −22 | 38 | |
| 13 | Internațional Bălești | 32 | 10 | 5 | 17 | 52 | 75 | −23 | 35 | |
| 14 | Știința Turburea | 32 | 9 | 1 | 22 | 50 | 81 | −31 | 28 | |
| 15 | Flacăra Roșia de Amaradia | 32 | 8 | 3 | 21 | 46 | 89 | −43 | 27 | |
| 16 | Petrolul Stoina (R) | 32 | 3 | 1 | 28 | 38 | 105 | −67 | 10 | Relegation to Liga V Gorj |
| 17 | Dumbrava Câlnic (R) | 32 | 1 | 4 | 27 | 17 | 116 | −99 | 7 | Relegation to Liga V Gorj |

Rules for classification: 1) Points; 2) Head-to-head points; 3) Head-to-head goal difference; 4) Head-to-head goals scored; 5) Head-to-head away goals scored; 6) Goal difference; 7) Goals scored.
(C) Champions; (Q) Qualified for the phase indicated; (R) Relegated

=== Harghita County ===
| Pos | Team | Pld | W | D | L | GF | GA | GD | Pts | Qualification or relegation |
|---|---|---|---|---|---|---|---|---|---|---|
| 1 | ASA Miercurea Ciuc Bălan (C, Q) | 22 | 20 | 1 | 1 | 97 | 18 | +79 | 61 | Qualification to promotion play-off |
| 2 | Metalul Vlăhița | 22 | 18 | 2 | 2 | 83 | 16 | +67 | 56 | |
| 3 | Străduința Mihăileni | 22 | 14 | 2 | 6 | 66 | 33 | +33 | 44 | |
| 4 | Ciceu | 22 | 13 | 2 | 7 | 69 | 40 | +29 | 41 | |
| 5 | Csillag Lunca de Jos | 22 | 10 | 4 | 8 | 58 | 52 | +6 | 34 | |
| 6 | Viitorul Gheorgheni | 22 | 9 | 5 | 8 | 45 | 42 | +3 | 32 | |
| 7 | Praid | 22 | 8 | 5 | 9 | 32 | 36 | −4 | 29 | |
| 8 | Unirea Cristuru Secuiesc | 22 | 6 | 4 | 12 | 41 | 49 | −8 | 22 | |
| 9 | Tulgheș | 22 | 7 | 0 | 15 | 31 | 74 | −43 | 21 | |
| 10 | CSȘ Miercurea Ciuc | 22 | 5 | 5 | 12 | 47 | 56 | −9 | 20 | |
| 11 | Știința Sărmaș Toplița (R) | 22 | 2 | 4 | 16 | 18 | 87 | −69 | 10 | Relegation to Liga V Harghita |
| 12 | Homorod Merești (R) | 22 | 1 | 4 | 17 | 24 | 108 | −84 | 7 | Relegation to Liga V Harghita |

Rules for classification: 1) Points; 2) Head-to-head points; 3) Head-to-head goal difference; 4) Head-to-head goals scored; 5) Head-to-head away goals scored; 6) Goal difference; 7) Goals scored.
(C) Champions; (Q) Qualified for the phase indicated; (R) Relegated

=== Hunedoara County ===
| Pos | Team | Pld | W | D | L | GF | GA | GD | Pts | Qualification or relegation |
|---|---|---|---|---|---|---|---|---|---|---|
| 1 | Hunedoara (C, Q) | 30 | 24 | 4 | 2 | 87 | 16 | +71 | 76 | Qualification to promotion play-off |
| 2 | Aurul Brad | 29 | 20 | 3 | 6 | 54 | 28 | +26 | 63 | |
| 3 | Minerul Uricani | 30 | 17 | 5 | 8 | 58 | 31 | +27 | 56 | |
| 4 | Vulcan | 29 | 14 | 11 | 4 | 50 | 27 | +23 | 53 | |
| 5 | Dacicus Orăștie | 28 | 16 | 2 | 10 | 76 | 54 | +22 | 50 | |
| 6 | Minerul Aninoasa | 29 | 12 | 9 | 8 | 51 | 27 | +24 | 45 | |
| 7 | Victoria Călan | 29 | 11 | 6 | 12 | 56 | 63 | −7 | 39 | |
| 8 | Inter Petrila | 28 | 11 | 5 | 12 | 43 | 43 | 0 | 38 | |
| 9 | Zarandul Crișcior | 28 | 9 | 9 | 10 | 42 | 39 | +3 | 36 | |
| 10 | Aurul Certej | 29 | 8 | 8 | 13 | 58 | 57 | +1 | 32 | |
| 11 | Gloria Geoagiu | 28 | 8 | 7 | 13 | 31 | 42 | −11 | 31 | |
| 12 | Mureșul Brănișca | 29 | 8 | 4 | 17 | 37 | 83 | −46 | 28 | |
| 13 | Metalul Crișcior | 30 | 9 | 6 | 15 | 23 | 43 | −20 | 27 (Note: Metalul Crișcior deducted 6 points) | |
| 14 | Agrocompany Băcia | 28 | 7 | 3 | 18 | 42 | 70 | −28 | 24 | |
| 15 | Universitatea Petroșani | 29 | 6 | 5 | 18 | 41 | 76 | −35 | 23 | |
| 16 | Minerul Teliuc | 29 | 5 | 5 | 19 | 24 | 76 | −52 | 20 | |

Rules for classification: 1) Points; 2) Head-to-head points; 3) Head-to-head goal difference; 4) Head-to-head goals scored; 5) Head-to-head away goals scored; 6) Goal difference; 7) Goals scored.
(C) Champions; (Q) Qualified for the phase indicated

=== Ialomița County ===
| Pos | Team | Pld | W | D | L | GF | GA | GD | Pts | Qualification or relegation |
|---|---|---|---|---|---|---|---|---|---|---|
| 1 | Victoria Țăndărei (C, Q) | 30 | 22 | 3 | 5 | 92 | 46 | +46 | 69 | Qualification to promotion play-off |
| 2 | Abatorul Slobozia | 30 | 20 | 7 | 3 | 108 | 50 | +58 | 67 | |
| 3 | Rapid Fetești | 30 | 19 | 5 | 6 | 67 | 44 | +23 | 62 | |
| 4 | Recolta Gheorghe Lazăr | 30 | 19 | 4 | 7 | 87 | 39 | +48 | 61 | |
| 5 | Viitorul Axintele | 30 | 19 | 3 | 8 | 100 | 44 | +56 | 60 | |
| 6 | Victoria Amara | 30 | 16 | 7 | 7 | 91 | 56 | +35 | 55 | |
| 7 | Players Slobozia | 30 | 15 | 7 | 8 | 72 | 53 | +19 | 52 | |
| 8 | Olimpia Brazii | 30 | 13 | 6 | 11 | 90 | 71 | +19 | 45 | |
| 9 | Viitorul Platonești | 30 | 11 | 5 | 14 | 50 | 66 | −16 | 38 | |
| 10 | Voința Reviga | 30 | 11 | 2 | 17 | 71 | 72 | −1 | 35 | |
| 11 | Victoria Munteni-Buzău | 30 | 10 | 3 | 17 | 53 | 67 | −14 | 33 | |
| 12 | Libertatea Sălcioara | 30 | 11 | 2 | 17 | 57 | 79 | −22 | 29 (Note: Libertatea Sălcioara deducted 6 points.) | |
| 13 | Unirea Grivița (R) | 30 | 7 | 3 | 20 | 49 | 111 | −62 | 24 | Relegation to Liga V Ialomița |
| 14 | Unirea Ion Roată (R) | 30 | 7 | 3 | 20 | 32 | 94 | −62 | 24 | Relegation to Liga V Ialomița |
| 15 | Recolta Bărcănești (R) | 30 | 6 | 2 | 22 | 61 | 114 | −53 | 20 | Relegation to Liga V Ialomița |
| 16 | Spicul Colilia (R) | 30 | 2 | 2 | 26 | 33 | 105 | −72 | 5 (Note: Spicul Colilia deducted 3 points.) | Relegation to Liga V Ialomița |

Rules for classification: 1) Points; 2) Head-to-head points; 3) Head-to-head goal difference; 4) Head-to-head goals scored; 5) Head-to-head away goals scored; 6) Goal difference; 7) Goals scored.
(C) Champions; (Q) Qualified for the phase indicated; (R) Relegated

=== Iași County ===
| Pos | Team | Pld | W | D | L | GF | GA | GD | Pts | Qualification or relegation |
|---|---|---|---|---|---|---|---|---|---|---|
| 1 | Rapid Dumești (C, Q) | 30 | 27 | 1 | 2 | 119 | 26 | +93 | 82 | Qualification to promotion play-off |
| 2 | Mega Pașcani | 30 | 17 | 7 | 6 | 82 | 50 | +32 | 58 | |
| 3 | Gloria Bălțați | 30 | 17 | 5 | 8 | 63 | 39 | +24 | 56 | |
| 4 | Astra Răducăneni | 30 | 17 | 3 | 10 | 79 | 53 | +26 | 54 | |
| 5 | Foresta Ciurea | 30 | 17 | 3 | 10 | 64 | 52 | +12 | 54 | |
| 6 | Stejarul Sinești | 30 | 15 | 4 | 11 | 78 | 37 | +41 | 49 | |
| 7 | Viitorul Hârlău | 30 | 14 | 6 | 10 | 53 | 46 | +7 | 48 | |
| 8 | Viitorul Belcești | 30 | 13 | 3 | 14 | 73 | 65 | +8 | 42 | |
| 9 | Unirea Ruginoasa | 30 | 13 | 2 | 15 | 47 | 51 | −4 | 41 | |
| 10 | Viitorul Lungani | 30 | 11 | 3 | 16 | 60 | 66 | −6 | 36 | |
| 11 | Unirea Mircești | 30 | 11 | 2 | 17 | 63 | 86 | −23 | 35 | |
| 12 | Olimpia Popricani | 30 | 10 | 5 | 15 | 32 | 67 | −35 | 35 | |
| 13 | Viitorul Târgu Frumos | 30 | 10 | 3 | 17 | 42 | 78 | −36 | 33 | |
| 14 | Helios Tomești (R) | 30 | 9 | 3 | 18 | 39 | 59 | −20 | 30 | Relegation to Liga V Iași |
| 15 | Romwatt Hărmănești (R) | 30 | 6 | 3 | 21 | 34 | 82 | −48 | 21 | Relegation to Liga V Iași |
| 16 | Podgoria Cotnari (R) | 30 | 4 | 5 | 21 | 34 | 105 | −71 | 17 | Relegation to Liga V Iași |

Rules for classification: 1) Points; 2) Head-to-head points; 3) Head-to-head goal difference; 4) Head-to-head goals scored; 5) Head-to-head away goals scored; 6) Goal difference; 7) Goals scored.
(C) Champions; (Q) Qualified for the phase indicated; (R) Relegated

=== Ilfov County ===
| Pos | Team | Pld | W | D | L | GF | GA | GD | Pts | Qualification or relegation |
|---|---|---|---|---|---|---|---|---|---|---|
| 1 | Balotești (Q) | 18 | 14 | 2 | 2 | 67 | 16 | +51 | 44 | Qualification to championship play-off |
| 2 | Lindab Ștefănești (Q) | 18 | 14 | 2 | 2 | 64 | 21 | +43 | 44 | Qualification to championship play-off |
| 3 | Afumați (Q) | 18 | 13 | 1 | 4 | 39 | 14 | +25 | 40 | Qualification to championship play-off |
| 4 | Viitorul Dragomirești (Q) | 18 | 12 | 1 | 5 | 46 | 18 | +28 | 37 | Qualification to championship play-off |
| 5 | Bragadiru | 18 | 8 | 4 | 6 | 44 | 23 | +21 | 28 | |
| 6 | Grădiștea | 18 | 6 | 0 | 12 | 29 | 53 | −24 | 18 | |
| 7 | Corbeanca | 18 | 5 | 1 | 12 | 39 | 51 | −12 | 16 | |
| 8 | Codrii Vlăsiei Moara Vlăsiei | 18 | 4 | 1 | 13 | 25 | 56 | −31 | 13 | |
| 9 | Glina | 18 | 4 | 0 | 14 | 23 | 72 | −49 | 12 | |
| 10 | Nuclear Măgurele | 18 | 4 | 0 | 14 | 14 | 66 | −52 | 12 | |

Rules for classification: 1) Points; 2) Head-to-head points; 3) Head-to-head goal difference; 4) Head-to-head goals scored; 5) Head-to-head away goals scored; 6) Goal difference; 7) Goals scored.
(Q) Qualified for the phase indicated

Championship play-off

Championship play-off played in a single round-robin tournament between the best four teams of the regular season. The teams started the play-off with the following points: 1st place – 3 points, 2nd place – 2 points, 3rd place – 1 point, 4th place – 0 points.

| Pos | Team | Pld | W | D | L | GF | GA | GD | Pts | Qualification |
|---|---|---|---|---|---|---|---|---|---|---|
| 1 | Afumați (C, Q) | 3 | 2 | 1 | 0 | 5 | 2 | +3 | 8 | Qualification for promotion play-off |
| 2 | Viitorul Dragomirești | 3 | 2 | 1 | 0 | 7 | 2 | +5 | 7 | |
| 3 | Balotești | 3 | 1 | 0 | 2 | 4 | 5 | −1 | 6 | |
| 4 | Lindab Ștefănești | 3 | 0 | 0 | 3 | 2 | 9 | −7 | 2 | |

Rules for classification: 1) Points; 2) Head-to-head points; 3) Head-to-head goal difference; 4) Head-to-head goals scored; 5) Head-to-head away goals scored; 6) Goal difference; 7) Goals scored.
(C) Champions; (Q) Qualified for the phase indicated

=== Maramureș County ===
North Series

| Pos | Team | Pld | W | D | L | GF | GA | GD | Pts | Qualification or relegation |
|---|---|---|---|---|---|---|---|---|---|---|
| 1 | Borșa (Q) | 22 | 19 | 1 | 2 | 87 | 29 | +58 | 58 | Qualification to championship final |
| 2 | Tisa Sighetu Marmației | 22 | 18 | 0 | 4 | 84 | 29 | +55 | 54 | |
| 3 | Rozalina Rozavlea | 22 | 15 | 1 | 6 | 94 | 55 | +39 | 46 | |
| 4 | Iza Dragomirești | 22 | 15 | 0 | 7 | 53 | 34 | +19 | 45 | |
| 5 | Marmația Sighetu Marmației II | 22 | 12 | 1 | 9 | 94 | 51 | +43 | 37 | |
| 6 | Zorile Moisei | 22 | 11 | 1 | 10 | 62 | 47 | +15 | 34 | |
| 7 | Salina Ocna Șugatag | 22 | 10 | 0 | 12 | 58 | 68 | −10 | 30 | |
| 8 | Foresta Câmpulung la Tisa | 22 | 8 | 4 | 10 | 52 | 68 | −16 | 28 | |
| 9 | Recolta Săliștea de Sus | 22 | 7 | 1 | 14 | 45 | 84 | −39 | 22 | |
| 10 | Avântul Bârsana | 22 | 4 | 1 | 17 | 34 | 88 | −54 | 13 | |
| 11 | Brișca Sarasău | 22 | 4 | 1 | 17 | 34 | 86 | −52 | 10 (Note: Brișca Sarasău deducted 3 points.) | |
| 12 | Bradul Vișeu de Sus | 22 | 3 | 1 | 18 | 25 | 93 | −68 | 10 | |

(Q) Qualified for the phase indicated
Notes:

South Series

| Pos | Team | Pld | W | D | L | GF | GA | GD | Pts | Qualification or relegation |
|---|---|---|---|---|---|---|---|---|---|---|
| 1 | Spicul Mocira (Q) | 26 | 21 | 4 | 1 | 97 | 33 | +64 | 67 | Qualification to championship final |
| 2 | Spicul Ardusat | 26 | 21 | 3 | 2 | 83 | 32 | +51 | 66 | |
| 3 | Asten Tăuții-Măgherăuș | 26 | 19 | 3 | 4 | 76 | 26 | +50 | 60 | |
| 4 | Progresul Șomcuta Mare | 26 | 16 | 5 | 5 | 60 | 33 | +27 | 53 | |
| 5 | Vectrix Satulung | 26 | 13 | 3 | 10 | 65 | 37 | +28 | 42 | |
| 6 | Unirea Șișești | 26 | 10 | 2 | 14 | 51 | 51 | 0 | 32 | |
| 7 | Minerul Cavnic | 26 | 9 | 5 | 12 | 50 | 64 | −14 | 32 | |
| 8 | Someșul Ulmeni | 26 | 10 | 1 | 15 | 58 | 62 | −4 | 31 (Note: Someșul Ulmeni was excluded from championship.) | |
| 9 | Lăpușul Târgu Lăpuș | 26 | 8 | 8 | 10 | 48 | 47 | +1 | 29 (Note: Lăpușul Târgu Lăpuș and Minerul Băița deducted 3 points.) | |
| 10 | Gloria Renel Baia Mare | 26 | 9 | 2 | 15 | 54 | 71 | −17 | 29 | |
| 11 | Eaton Fărcașa | 26 | 7 | 5 | 14 | 37 | 52 | −15 | 26 | |
| 12 | Minerul Băița | 26 | 6 | 5 | 15 | 60 | 74 | −14 | 20 | |
| 13 | Someșul Tămaia | 26 | 5 | 4 | 17 | 35 | 85 | −50 | 19 | |
| 14 | Independența Baia Mare | 26 | 4 | 2 | 20 | 31 | 122 | −91 | 14 | |

(Q) Qualified for the phase indicated
Notes:

Championship final

The championship final was played on 2 June 2010 at Viorel Mateianu Stadium in Baia Mare.

| Team 1 | Score | Team 2 |
|---|---|---|
| Spicul Mocira | 6–2 | Borșa |

Spicul Mocira won the Liga IV Maramureș County and qualify to promotion play-off in Liga III.

=== Mehedinți County ===
| Pos | Team | Pld | W | D | L | GF | GA | GD | Pts | Qualification or relegation |
|---|---|---|---|---|---|---|---|---|---|---|
| 1 | Termo Drobeta-Turnu-Severin (C, Q) | 22 | 21 | 0 | 1 | 128 | 13 | +115 | 63 | Qualification to promotion play-off |
| 2 | Agromec Șimian | 22 | 14 | 0 | 8 | 60 | 38 | +22 | 42 | |
| 3 | Pandurii Cerneți | 22 | 12 | 4 | 6 | 53 | 36 | +17 | 40 | |
| 4 | Dunărea Gruia | 22 | 11 | 4 | 7 | 42 | 32 | +10 | 37 | |
| 5 | Recolta Dănceu | 22 | 11 | 2 | 9 | 56 | 49 | +7 | 35 | |
| 6 | Strehaia | 22 | 11 | 1 | 10 | 59 | 50 | +9 | 34 | |
| 7 | Dunărea Pristol | 22 | 10 | 3 | 9 | 57 | 50 | +7 | 33 | |
| 8 | Blahnița Pătulele | 22 | 9 | 5 | 8 | 50 | 43 | +7 | 32 | |
| 9 | Viitorul Cujmir | 22 | 7 | 1 | 14 | 37 | 67 | −30 | 22 | |
| 10 | Constructorul Eșelnița | 22 | 6 | 1 | 15 | 26 | 70 | −44 | 19 | |
| 11 | Victoria Devesel | 22 | 5 | 0 | 17 | 38 | 91 | −53 | 15 | |
| 12 | Corcova | 22 | 3 | 1 | 18 | 26 | 107 | −81 | 10 | |

Rules for classification: 1) Points; 2) Head-to-head points; 3) Head-to-head goal difference; 4) Head-to-head goals scored; 5) Head-to-head away goals scored; 6) Goal difference; 7) Goals scored.
(C) Champions; (Q) Qualified for the phase indicated

=== Neamț County ===
| Pos | Team | Pld | W | D | L | GF | GA | GD | Pts | Qualification or relegation |
|---|---|---|---|---|---|---|---|---|---|---|
| 1 | Energia Girov (C, Q) | 34 | 30 | 2 | 2 | 107 | 16 | +91 | 92 | Qualification to promotion play-off |
| 2 | Voința Ion Creangă | 34 | 28 | 2 | 4 | 133 | 25 | +108 | 86 | |
| 3 | Bradul Roznov | 34 | 27 | 4 | 3 | 169 | 34 | +135 | 85 | |
| 4 | Siretul Adjudeni | 34 | 17 | 6 | 11 | 91 | 71 | +20 | 57 | |
| 5 | Speranța Răucești | 34 | 17 | 6 | 11 | 78 | 73 | +5 | 57 | |
| 6 | Victoria Horia | 34 | 17 | 2 | 15 | 77 | 74 | +3 | 53 | |
| 7 | Biruința Gherăiești | 34 | 16 | 4 | 14 | 87 | 74 | +13 | 52 | |
| 8 | Voința Dochia | 34 | 16 | 4 | 14 | 55 | 70 | −15 | 52 | |
| 9 | Viitorul Podoleni | 34 | 16 | 3 | 15 | 69 | 81 | −12 | 51 | |
| 10 | LPS Roman | 34 | 13 | 6 | 15 | 60 | 67 | −7 | 45 | |
| 11 | Spicul Tămășeni | 34 | 13 | 3 | 18 | 66 | 79 | −13 | 42 | |
| 12 | Cimentul Bicaz | 34 | 13 | 1 | 20 | 53 | 52 | +1 | 40 (Note: Cimentul Bicaz withdrew in the second part of the season and lost all remaining matches with 0–3.) | |
| 13 | Energia Pângărați | 34 | 10 | 5 | 19 | 69 | 100 | −31 | 35 | |
| 14 | Ozana Timisești | 34 | 10 | 5 | 19 | 62 | 109 | −47 | 35 | |
| 15 | Bradul Borca | 34 | 9 | 7 | 18 | 62 | 94 | −32 | 34 | |
| 16 | Teiul Poiana Teiului | 34 | 11 | 1 | 22 | 49 | 100 | −51 | 34 | |
| 17 | Stejarul Țibucani (R) | 34 | 6 | 5 | 23 | 36 | 96 | −60 | 23 | Relegation to Liga V Neamț |
| 18 | Stânca Ștefan cel Mare (R) | 34 | 4 | 0 | 30 | 19 | 128 | −109 | 12 (Note: Stânca Ștefan cel Mare withdrew at the end of the first part of the season and lost all remaining matches with 0–3.) | Relegation to Liga V Neamț |
| 19 | Vulturul Zănești (D) | 0 | 0 | 0 | 0 | 0 | 0 | 0 | 0 (Note: Vulturul Zănești withdrew from championship after 8 rounds and all its results were canceled.) | Withdrew |
| 20 | Viitorul Ruginoasa (D) | 0 | 0 | 0 | 0 | 0 | 0 | 0 | 0 (Note: Viitorul Ruginoasa withdrew from championship after 5 rounds and all its results were canceled.) | Withdrew |

Rules for classification: 1) Points; 2) Head-to-head points; 3) Head-to-head goal difference; 4) Head-to-head goals scored; 5) Head-to-head away goals scored; 6) Goal difference; 7) Goals scored.
(C) Champions; (D) Disqualified; (Q) Qualified for the phase indicated; (R) Relegated

=== Olt County ===
| Pos | Team | Pld | W | D | L | GF | GA | GD | Pts | Qualification or relegation |
|---|---|---|---|---|---|---|---|---|---|---|
| 1 | CSM Slatina (C, Q) | 29 | 29 | 0 | 0 | 131 | 4 | +127 | 87 | Qualification to promotion play-off |
| 2 | Unirea Turia | 29 | 22 | 1 | 6 | 74 | 32 | +42 | 67 | |
| 3 | Olimpia Rotunda | 29 | 20 | 3 | 6 | 77 | 48 | +29 | 63 | |
| 4 | Rapid Piatra-Olt | 29 | 18 | 2 | 9 | 68 | 37 | +31 | 56 | |
| 5 | Gloria Vișina | 29 | 15 | 3 | 11 | 67 | 41 | +26 | 48 | |
| 6 | Viitorul Grădinile | 29 | 14 | 5 | 10 | 95 | 53 | +42 | 47 | |
| 7 | Știința Dăneasa | 29 | 14 | 2 | 13 | 80 | 67 | +13 | 44 | |
| 8 | Olt Scornicești | 29 | 12 | 6 | 11 | 56 | 59 | −3 | 42 | |
| 9 | Unirea Comanca | 29 | 13 | 3 | 13 | 67 | 79 | −12 | 42 | |
| 10 | Petrolul Potcoava | 29 | 12 | 5 | 12 | 51 | 34 | +17 | 41 | |
| 11 | Recolta Urzica | 29 | 8 | 2 | 19 | 40 | 85 | −45 | 26 | |
| 12 | Unirea Pârșcoveni | 29 | 8 | 2 | 19 | 38 | 100 | −62 | 26 | |
| 13 | Oltețul Osica | 29 | 7 | 4 | 18 | 36 | 62 | −26 | 25 | |
| 14 | Balș | 29 | 7 | 2 | 20 | 29 | 86 | −57 | 23 | |
| 15 | CSȘ Corabia | 29 | 4 | 1 | 24 | 22 | 88 | −66 | 13 | |
| 16 | Gloria Deveselu | 29 | 3 | 1 | 25 | 23 | 100 | −77 | 10 | |

Rules for classification: 1) Points; 2) Head-to-head points; 3) Head-to-head goal difference; 4) Head-to-head goals scored; 5) Head-to-head away goals scored; 6) Goal difference; 7) Goals scored.
(C) Champions; (Q) Qualified for the phase indicated

=== Prahova County ===
| Pos | Team | Pld | W | D | L | GF | GA | GD | Pts | Qualification or relegation |
|---|---|---|---|---|---|---|---|---|---|---|
| 1 | Plopeni (C, Q) | 34 | 28 | 5 | 1 | 105 | 22 | +83 | 89 | Qualification to promotion play-off |
| 2 | Avântul Măneciu | 34 | 22 | 4 | 8 | 90 | 43 | +47 | 70 | |
| 3 | Victoria Fântânele | 34 | 17 | 5 | 12 | 63 | 50 | +13 | 56 | |
| 4 | Caraimanul Bușteni | 34 | 15 | 7 | 12 | 61 | 56 | +5 | 52 | |
| 5 | Unirea Câmpina | 34 | 16 | 3 | 15 | 68 | 56 | +12 | 51 | |
| 6 | Ceptura | 34 | 15 | 4 | 15 | 58 | 51 | +7 | 49 | |
| 7 | Unirea Urlați | 34 | 16 | 1 | 17 | 55 | 63 | −8 | 49 | |
| 8 | Tineretul Tomșani | 34 | 14 | 7 | 13 | 52 | 67 | −15 | 49 | |
| 9 | Bănești-Urleta | 34 | 15 | 3 | 16 | 62 | 50 | +12 | 48 | |
| 10 | Brebu | 34 | 13 | 9 | 12 | 48 | 44 | +4 | 48 | |
| 11 | Podgoria Vadu Săpat | 34 | 13 | 8 | 13 | 49 | 51 | −2 | 47 | |
| 12 | Petrolul Ploiești II | 34 | 13 | 5 | 16 | 56 | 46 | +10 | 44 | |
| 13 | Slănic | 34 | 13 | 5 | 16 | 53 | 60 | −7 | 44 | |
| 14 | Petrolul 95 Ploiești | 34 | 11 | 8 | 15 | 41 | 52 | −11 | 41 | |
| 15 | Brazi (R) | 34 | 12 | 7 | 15 | 47 | 66 | −19 | 40 (Note: Brazi deducted 3 points.) | Relegation to Liga V Prahova |
| 16 | Păulești (R) | 34 | 10 | 7 | 17 | 52 | 73 | −21 | 37 | Relegation to Liga V Prahova |
| 17 | Voința Bălțești (R) | 34 | 8 | 5 | 21 | 51 | 102 | −51 | 29 | Relegation to Liga V Prahova |
| 18 | Gloria Vâlcănești (R) | 34 | 6 | 5 | 23 | 44 | 89 | −45 | 23 | Relegation to Liga V Prahova |

Rules for classification: 1) Points; 2) Head-to-head points; 3) Head-to-head goal difference; 4) Head-to-head goals scored; 5) Head-to-head away goals scored; 6) Goal difference; 7) Goals scored.
(C) Champions; (Q) Qualified for the phase indicated; (R) Relegated

=== Satu Mare County ===
Seria A

| Pos | Team | Pld | W | D | L | GF | GA | GD | Pts | Qualification or relegation |
|---|---|---|---|---|---|---|---|---|---|---|
| 1 | Gama Homoroade (Q) | 26 | 21 | 2 | 3 | 98 | 42 | +56 | 65 | Qualification to championship final |
| 2 | Dacia Medieșu Aurit | 26 | 20 | 2 | 4 | 84 | 29 | +55 | 62 | |
| 3 | Energia Negrești-Oaș | 26 | 18 | 4 | 4 | 85 | 27 | +58 | 58 | |
| 4 | Recolta Dorolț | 26 | 18 | 4 | 4 | 70 | 26 | +44 | 58 | |
| 5 | Someșul Cărășeu | 26 | 15 | 2 | 9 | 50 | 42 | +8 | 47 | |
| 6 | Viitorul Vetiș | 26 | 14 | 1 | 11 | 79 | 69 | +10 | 43 | |
| 7 | Talna Orașu Nou | 26 | 12 | 3 | 11 | 54 | 45 | +9 | 39 | |
| 8 | Șoimii Mădăras | 26 | 10 | 3 | 13 | 53 | 61 | −8 | 33 | |
| 9 | Olimpia Satu Mare | 26 | 8 | 6 | 12 | 37 | 48 | −11 | 30 | |
| 10 | Forestiera Bixad | 26 | 8 | 3 | 15 | 40 | 60 | −20 | 27 | |
| 11 | Livada | 26 | 8 | 2 | 16 | 49 | 79 | −30 | 26 | |
| 12 | Someșul Odoreu | 26 | 6 | 5 | 15 | 34 | 55 | −21 | 23 | |
| 13 | Minerul Turț | 26 | 3 | 2 | 21 | 24 | 84 | −60 | 11 | |
| 14 | Egri Sasok Agriș (R) | 26 | 1 | 1 | 24 | 14 | 104 | −90 | 4 | Relegation to Liga V Satu Mare |

Rules for classification: 1) Points; 2) Head-to-head points; 3) Head-to-head goal difference; 4) Head-to-head goals scored; 5) Head-to-head away goals scored; 6) Goal difference; 7) Goals scored.
(Q) Qualified for the phase indicated; (R) Relegated

Seria B

| Pos | Team | Pld | W | D | L | GF | GA | GD | Pts | Qualification or relegation |
|---|---|---|---|---|---|---|---|---|---|---|
| 1 | Victoria Carei (Q) | 26 | 21 | 1 | 4 | 86 | 22 | +64 | 64 | Qualification to championship final |
| 2 | Olimpia Căuaș | 26 | 18 | 2 | 6 | 68 | 29 | +39 | 56 | |
| 3 | Someșul Oar | 26 | 16 | 7 | 3 | 51 | 17 | +34 | 55 | |
| 4 | Unirea Tășnad | 26 | 13 | 7 | 6 | 56 | 24 | +32 | 46 | |
| 5 | Frohlich Foieni | 26 | 13 | 6 | 7 | 35 | 23 | +12 | 45 | |
| 6 | Schwaben Cămin | 26 | 12 | 6 | 8 | 71 | 40 | +31 | 42 | |
| 7 | Luceafărul Decebal | 26 | 11 | 4 | 11 | 39 | 42 | −3 | 37 | |
| 8 | Real Andrid | 26 | 9 | 7 | 10 | 42 | 42 | 0 | 34 | |
| 9 | Stăruința Berveni | 26 | 7 | 8 | 11 | 32 | 46 | −14 | 29 | |
| 10 | Fortuna Căpleni | 26 | 8 | 4 | 14 | 41 | 52 | −11 | 28 | |
| 11 | Victoria Petrești | 26 | 5 | 6 | 15 | 27 | 65 | −38 | 21 | |
| 12 | Kneho Urziceni | 26 | 5 | 5 | 16 | 20 | 47 | −27 | 20 | |
| 13 | Recolta Sanislău | 26 | 5 | 5 | 16 | 25 | 65 | −40 | 20 | |
| 14 | Unirea Pișcolt (R) | 26 | 4 | 2 | 20 | 36 | 114 | −78 | 14 | Relegation to Liga V Satu Mare |

Rules for classification: 1) Points; 2) Head-to-head points; 3) Head-to-head goal difference; 4) Head-to-head goals scored; 5) Head-to-head away goals scored; 6) Goal difference; 7) Goals scored.
(Q) Qualified for the phase indicated; (R) Relegated

Championship final

The championship final was played on 5 June 2010 at Olimpia Stadium in Satu Mare.

| Team 1 | Score | Team 2 |
|---|---|---|
| Gama Homoroade | 1–1 (6–7 p) | Victoria Carei |

Victoria Carei won the Liga IV Satu Mare County and qualify to promotion play-off in Liga III.

=== Sălaj County ===
East Series

| Pos | Team | Pld | W | D | L | GF | GA | GD | Pts | Qualification |
|---|---|---|---|---|---|---|---|---|---|---|
| 1 | Someșul Ileanda | 14 | 14 | 0 | 0 | 43 | 7 | +36 | 42 | Qualification to championship play-off |
| 2 | Rapid Jibou | 14 | 8 | 2 | 4 | 38 | 24 | +14 | 26 | Qualification to championship play-off |
| 3 | Meseșul Treznea | 14 | 8 | 2 | 4 | 46 | 15 | +31 | 26 | Qualification to championship play-off |
| 4 | Dumbrava Gâlgău Almașului | 14 | 7 | 0 | 7 | 30 | 27 | +3 | 21 | Qualification to championship play-off |
| 5 | Someșul Someș-Odorhei | 14 | 5 | 2 | 7 | 24 | 30 | −6 | 17 | Qualification to championship play-out |
| 6 | Progresul Bălan | 14 | 4 | 2 | 8 | 30 | 39 | −9 | 14 | Qualification to championship play-out |
| 7 | Silvania Cehu Silvaniei | 14 | 4 | 1 | 9 | 28 | 40 | −12 | 13 | Qualification to championship play-out |
| 8 | Real Crișeni | 14 | 1 | 1 | 12 | 7 | 64 | −57 | 4 | Qualification to championship play-out |

Rules for classification: 1) Points; 2) Head-to-head points; 3) Head-to-head goal difference; 4) Head-to-head goals scored; 5) Head-to-head away goals scored; 6) Goal difference; 7) Goals scored.

West Series

| Pos | Team | Pld | W | D | L | GF | GA | GD | Pts | Qualification |
|---|---|---|---|---|---|---|---|---|---|---|
| 1 | Favorit Crasna | 14 | 11 | 0 | 3 | 56 | 16 | +40 | 33 | Qualification to championship play-off |
| 2 | Barcău Nușfalău | 14 | 10 | 2 | 2 | 55 | 13 | +42 | 32 | Qualification to championship play-off |
| 3 | Logistic Zalău II | 14 | 9 | 2 | 3 | 46 | 19 | +27 | 29 | Qualification to championship play-off |
| 4 | Flacăra Halmășd | 14 | 7 | 0 | 7 | 35 | 40 | −5 | 21 | Qualification to championship play-off |
| 5 | Gloria Bobota | 14 | 5 | 3 | 6 | 20 | 25 | −5 | 18 | Qualification to championship play-out |
| 6 | Venus Măeriște | 14 | 4 | 3 | 7 | 24 | 35 | −11 | 15 | Qualification to championship play-out |
| 7 | Chieșd | 14 | 2 | 1 | 11 | 17 | 56 | −39 | 7 | Qualification to championship play-out |
| 8 | Gloria Meseșeni | 14 | 1 | 3 | 10 | 4 | 53 | −49 | 6 | Qualification to championship play-out |

Rules for classification: 1) Points; 2) Head-to-head points; 3) Head-to-head goal difference; 4) Head-to-head goals scored; 5) Head-to-head away goals scored; 6) Goal difference; 7) Goals scored.

Championship play-off

| Pos | Team | Pld | W | D | L | GF | GA | GD | Pts | Qualification |
|---|---|---|---|---|---|---|---|---|---|---|
| 1 | Someșul Ileanda (C, Q) | 14 | 13 | 0 | 1 | 48 | 16 | +32 | 39 | Qualification to promotion play-off |
| 2 | Barcău Nușfalău | 14 | 10 | 2 | 2 | 47 | 13 | +34 | 32 | |
| 3 | Rapid Jibou | 14 | 8 | 1 | 5 | 35 | 26 | +9 | 25 | |
| 4 | Dumbrava Gâlgău Almașului | 14 | 7 | 2 | 5 | 32 | 29 | +3 | 23 | |
| 5 | Meseșul Treznea | 14 | 6 | 2 | 6 | 36 | 27 | +9 | 20 | |
| 6 | Favorit Crasna | 14 | 4 | 1 | 9 | 20 | 38 | −18 | 13 | |
| 7 | Logistic Zalău II | 14 | 3 | 1 | 10 | 27 | 42 | −15 | 10 | |
| 8 | Flacăra Halmășd | 14 | 0 | 1 | 13 | 19 | 73 | −54 | 1 | |

Rules for classification: 1) Points; 2) Head-to-head points; 3) Head-to-head goal difference; 4) Head-to-head goals scored; 5) Head-to-head away goals scored; 6) Goal difference; 7) Goals scored.
(C) Champions; (Q) Qualified for the phase indicated

Championship play-out

| Pos | Team | Pld | W | D | L | GF | GA | GD | Pts | Relegation |
|---|---|---|---|---|---|---|---|---|---|---|
| 9 | Gloria Bobota | 14 | 9 | 2 | 3 | 35 | 13 | +22 | 29 | |
| 10 | Someșul Someș-Odorhei | 14 | 9 | 1 | 4 | 38 | 24 | +14 | 28 | |
| 11 | Chieșd | 14 | 8 | 2 | 4 | 34 | 25 | +9 | 26 | |
| 12 | Venus Măeriște | 14 | 6 | 5 | 3 | 32 | 18 | +14 | 23 | |
| 13 | Silvania Cehu Silvaniei | 14 | 6 | 3 | 5 | 35 | 27 | +8 | 21 | |
| 14 | Progresul Bălan | 14 | 5 | 2 | 7 | 30 | 33 | −3 | 17 | |
| 15 | Gloria Meseșeni (R) | 12 | 1 | 2 | 9 | 2 | 28 | −26 | 5 | Relegation to Liga V Sălaj |
| 16 | Real Crișeni (R) | 12 | 1 | 1 | 10 | 5 | 43 | −38 | 4 | Relegation to Liga V Sălaj |

Rules for classification: 1) Points; 2) Head-to-head points; 3) Head-to-head goal difference; 4) Head-to-head goals scored; 5) Head-to-head away goals scored; 6) Goal difference; 7) Goals scored.
(R) Relegated

=== Sibiu County ===
| Pos | Team | Pld | W | D | L | GF | GA | GD | Pts | Qualification or relegation |
|---|---|---|---|---|---|---|---|---|---|---|
| 1 | Voința Sibiu II (C, Q) | 22 | 18 | 3 | 1 | 78 | 14 | +64 | 57 | Qualification to promotion play-off |
| 2 | Avrig | 22 | 16 | 2 | 4 | 94 | 28 | +66 | 50 | |
| 3 | Sparta Mediaș | 22 | 14 | 3 | 5 | 72 | 19 | +53 | 45 | |
| 4 | Tălmaciu | 22 | 11 | 4 | 7 | 53 | 33 | +20 | 37 | |
| 5 | Agnita | 21 | 11 | 2 | 8 | 48 | 31 | +17 | 35 | |
| 6 | Interstar Sibiu | 22 | 10 | 2 | 10 | 29 | 53 | −24 | 32 | |
| 7 | Juventus Sibiu | 22 | 7 | 3 | 12 | 31 | 43 | −12 | 24 (Note: Juventus Sibiu withdrew from championship and lost all remaining matches with 0–3.) | |
| 8 | Cisnădie II | 22 | 7 | 2 | 13 | 32 | 51 | −19 | 23 | |
| 9 | Sevișul Șelimbăr | 22 | 7 | 2 | 13 | 39 | 63 | −24 | 23 | |
| 10 | ASA Sibiu | 21 | 7 | 1 | 13 | 23 | 64 | −41 | 22 | |
| 11 | Unirea Ocna Sibiului | 22 | 6 | 3 | 13 | 36 | 64 | −28 | 21 | |
| 12 | Mihăiță Stănescu | 22 | 3 | 1 | 18 | 23 | 95 | −72 | 10 | |

Rules for classification: 1) Points; 2) Head-to-head points; 3) Head-to-head goal difference; 4) Head-to-head goals scored; 5) Head-to-head away goals scored; 6) Goal difference; 7) Goals scored.
(C) Champions; (Q) Qualified for the phase indicated

=== Suceava County ===
| Pos | Team | Pld | W | D | L | GF | GA | GD | Pts | Qualification or relegation |
|---|---|---|---|---|---|---|---|---|---|---|
| 1 | Foresta Mălini (C, Q) | 30 | 25 | 2 | 3 | 104 | 34 | +70 | 77 | Qualification to promotion play-off |
| 2 | Cetatea II Arbore | 30 | 18 | 6 | 6 | 76 | 27 | +49 | 60 | |
| 3 | Danalis Zvoriștea | 30 | 17 | 3 | 10 | 59 | 39 | +20 | 54 | |
| 4 | Dorna Vatra Dornei | 30 | 15 | 7 | 8 | 81 | 52 | +29 | 52 | |
| 5 | Viitorul Liteni | 30 | 14 | 5 | 11 | 61 | 54 | +7 | 47 | |
| 6 | Foresta Moldovița | 30 | 14 | 4 | 12 | 60 | 50 | +10 | 46 | |
| 7 | Nicu Gane Fălticeni | 30 | 14 | 3 | 13 | 53 | 51 | +2 | 45 | |
| 8 | Avântul Frasin | 30 | 14 | 2 | 14 | 59 | 58 | +1 | 44 | |
| 9 | Marginea | 30 | 12 | 6 | 12 | 52 | 65 | −13 | 42 | |
| 10 | Minerul Iacobeni | 30 | 13 | 0 | 17 | 54 | 77 | −23 | 39 | |
| 11 | Unirea Boroaia | 30 | 11 | 5 | 14 | 53 | 61 | −8 | 38 | |
| 12 | Bucovina Rădăuți | 30 | 11 | 3 | 16 | 61 | 65 | −4 | 36 | |
| 13 | Florconstruct Pătrăuți | 30 | 11 | 3 | 16 | 55 | 71 | −16 | 36 | |
| 14 | Pojorâta | 30 | 10 | 2 | 18 | 51 | 72 | −21 | 32 | Relegation to Liga V Suceava |
| 15 | Steaua Dumbrăveni | 30 | 7 | 3 | 20 | 35 | 67 | −32 | 24 | Relegation to Liga V Suceava |
| 16 | Releul Mihoveni | 30 | 7 | 0 | 23 | 35 | 106 | −71 | 21 | Relegation to Liga V Suceava |

Rules for classification: 1) Points; 2) Head-to-head points; 3) Head-to-head goal difference; 4) Head-to-head goals scored; 5) Head-to-head away goals scored; 6) Goal difference; 7) Goals scored.
(C) Champions; (Q) Qualified for the phase indicated

=== Teleorman County ===
| Pos | Team | Pld | W | D | L | GF | GA | GD | Pts | Qualification or relegation |
|---|---|---|---|---|---|---|---|---|---|---|
| 1 | Dunărea Turris Turnu Măgurele (C, Q) | 30 | 21 | 5 | 4 | 103 | 32 | +71 | 68 | Qualification to promotion play-off |
| 2 | Metalul Peretu | 30 | 22 | 2 | 6 | 91 | 39 | +52 | 68 | |
| 3 | Viață Nouă Olteni | 29 | 17 | 6 | 6 | 87 | 40 | +47 | 57 | |
| 4 | Sporting Roșiori | 30 | 16 | 3 | 11 | 63 | 41 | +22 | 51 | |
| 5 | Spicpo Poroschia | 30 | 15 | 3 | 12 | 85 | 72 | +13 | 48 | |
| 6 | Flacăra Talpa | 30 | 14 | 4 | 12 | 51 | 54 | −3 | 46 | |
| 7 | Rapid Buzescu | 30 | 14 | 1 | 15 | 76 | 68 | +8 | 43 | |
| 8 | Voința Saelele | 30 | 12 | 6 | 12 | 68 | 41 | +27 | 42 | |
| 9 | Dunărea Zimnicea | 29 | 13 | 2 | 14 | 52 | 42 | +10 | 41 | |
| 10 | Tineretul Crevenicu | 30 | 12 | 5 | 13 | 40 | 56 | −16 | 41 | |
| 11 | Atletic Orbeasca | 30 | 12 | 4 | 14 | 57 | 52 | +5 | 40 | |
| 12 | Unirea Țigănești | 30 | 12 | 4 | 14 | 53 | 77 | −24 | 40 | |
| 13 | Petrolul Videle II | 30 | 10 | 8 | 12 | 56 | 48 | +8 | 38 | |
| 14 | Steaua Spătărei (Note: Steaua Spătărei was spared from relegation due to the promotion of Dunărea Turris Turnu Măgurele in Liga III.) | 30 | 12 | 2 | 16 | 59 | 75 | −16 | 38 | Spared from relegation |
| 15 | Beirut Siliștea (R) | 30 | 6 | 4 | 20 | 33 | 120 | −87 | 22 | Relegation to Liga V Teleorman |
| 16 | Iorom Moșteni (R) | 30 | 1 | 1 | 28 | 21 | 138 | −117 | 4 | Relegation to Liga V Teleorman |

Rules for classification: 1) Points; 2) Head-to-head points; 3) Head-to-head goal difference; 4) Head-to-head goals scored; 5) Head-to-head away goals scored; 6) Goal difference; 7) Goals scored.
(C) Champions; (Q) Qualified for the phase indicated; (R) Relegated

=== Timiș County ===
| Pos | Team | Pld | W | D | L | GF | GA | GD | Pts | Qualification or relegation |
|---|---|---|---|---|---|---|---|---|---|---|
| 1 | Chișoda (C, Q) | 30 | 22 | 3 | 5 | 99 | 41 | +58 | 69 | Qualification to promotion play-off |
| 2 | Politehnica 2002 Timișoara | 30 | 21 | 5 | 4 | 87 | 31 | +56 | 68 | |
| 3 | Lugoj | 30 | 16 | 6 | 8 | 68 | 36 | +32 | 54 | |
| 4 | Unirea Cerneteaz | 30 | 16 | 6 | 8 | 55 | 53 | +2 | 54 | |
| 5 | Știința 2007 Timișoara | 30 | 15 | 6 | 9 | 58 | 49 | +9 | 51 | |
| 6 | Juventus Pișchia | 30 | 15 | 5 | 10 | 64 | 34 | +30 | 50 | |
| 7 | Pobeda Dudeștii Vechi | 30 | 13 | 4 | 13 | 55 | 58 | −3 | 43 | |
| 8 | Auto Timișoara | 30 | 13 | 2 | 15 | 65 | 65 | 0 | 41 | |
| 9 | Dumbrăvița | 30 | 12 | 5 | 13 | 52 | 58 | −6 | 41 | |
| 10 | Nuova Mama Mia Becicherecu Mic II | 30 | 12 | 4 | 14 | 83 | 77 | +6 | 40 | |
| 11 | Giroc | 30 | 10 | 6 | 14 | 60 | 61 | −1 | 36 | |
| 12 | Peciu Nou | 30 | 10 | 6 | 14 | 46 | 55 | −9 | 36 | |
| 13 | Marcel Băban Jimbolia | 30 | 11 | 3 | 16 | 39 | 50 | −11 | 36 | |
| 14 | Timișul Șag | 30 | 7 | 8 | 15 | 39 | 64 | −25 | 29 | |
| 15 | Deta (R) | 30 | 7 | 3 | 20 | 49 | 107 | −58 | 24 | Relegation to Liga V Timiș |
| 16 | Real Dragșina (R) | 30 | 2 | 4 | 24 | 24 | 104 | −80 | 10 | Relegation to Liga V Timiș |

Rules for classification: 1) Points; 2) Head-to-head points; 3) Head-to-head goal difference; 4) Head-to-head goals scored; 5) Head-to-head away goals scored; 6) Goal difference; 7) Goals scored.
(C) Champions; (Q) Qualified for the phase indicated; (R) Relegated

=== Tulcea County ===
| Pos | Team | Pld | W | D | L | GF | GA | GD | Pts | Qualification or relegation |
|---|---|---|---|---|---|---|---|---|---|---|
| 1 | Eolica Baia (C, Q) | 28 | 23 | 1 | 4 | 111 | 38 | +73 | 70 | Qualification to promotion play-off |
| 2 | Granitul Babadag | 28 | 21 | 2 | 5 | 90 | 41 | +49 | 65 | |
| 3 | Arrubium Măcin | 28 | 17 | 4 | 7 | 69 | 43 | +26 | 55 | |
| 4 | Triumf Cerna | 28 | 17 | 3 | 8 | 90 | 45 | +45 | 54 | |
| 5 | Luceafărul Slava Cercheză | 28 | 16 | 5 | 7 | 67 | 42 | +25 | 53 | |
| 6 | Unirea Casimcea | 28 | 16 | 2 | 10 | 79 | 59 | +20 | 50 | |
| 7 | Tractorul Horia | 28 | 14 | 4 | 10 | 67 | 74 | −7 | 46 | |
| 8 | Flacăra Mihail Kogălniceanu | 28 | 12 | 4 | 12 | 69 | 54 | +15 | 40 | |
| 9 | Pescărușul Sarichioi | 28 | 11 | 3 | 14 | 48 | 56 | −8 | 36 | |
| 10 | Șoimii Topolog | 28 | 10 | 0 | 18 | 53 | 76 | −23 | 30 | |
| 11 | Național Somova | 28 | 8 | 7 | 13 | 54 | 72 | −18 | 31 | |
| 12 | Progresul Isaccea | 28 | 7 | 5 | 16 | 62 | 76 | −14 | 26 | |
| 13 | Viitorul Ciucurova | 28 | 7 | 2 | 19 | 40 | 91 | −51 | 23 | |
| 14 | Gloria Agighiol (R) | 28 | 4 | 3 | 21 | 39 | 100 | −61 | 15 | Relegation to Liga V Tulcea |
| 15 | Razim Jurilovca (R) | 28 | 4 | 1 | 23 | 25 | 94 | −69 | 13 | Relegation to Liga V Tulcea |
| 16 | Rapid Izvoarele (D) | 0 | 0 | 0 | 0 | 0 | 0 | 0 | 0 (Note: Rapid Izvoarele withdrew in the first part of the season and all its results were canceled.) | Expelled |

Rules for classification: 1) Points; 2) Head-to-head points; 3) Head-to-head goal difference; 4) Head-to-head goals scored; 5) Head-to-head away goals scored; 6) Goal difference; 7) Goals scored.
(C) Champions; (D) Disqualified; (Q) Qualified for the phase indicated; (R) Relegated

=== Vaslui County ===
Championship play-off

The championship play-off was contested between the top two teams in the two series of the regular season.

Semi-finals

| Team 1 | Agg. | Team 2 | 1st leg | 2nd leg |
|---|---|---|---|---|
| Dinamo ARI Râșești | 8–1 | Voința Ștefan cel Mare | 6–0 | 2–1 |
| Gârceni | 1–2 | Huși | 1–0 | 0–2 |

Final

| Team 1 | Score | Team 2 |
|---|---|---|
| Dinamo ARI Râșești | 2–0 | Huși |

Dinamo ARI Râșești won the Liga IV Vaslui County and qualify to promotion play-off in Liga III.

=== Vâlcea County ===
| Pos | Team | Pld | W | D | L | GF | GA | GD | Pts | Qualification or relegation |
|---|---|---|---|---|---|---|---|---|---|---|
| 1 | Oltul Ionești 2009 (C, Q) | 34 | 26 | 4 | 4 | 117 | 29 | +88 | 82 | Qualification to promotion play-off |
| 2 | Damila Măciuca | 34 | 23 | 6 | 5 | 88 | 23 | +65 | 75 | |
| 3 | Minerul Berbești | 34 | 21 | 7 | 6 | 76 | 42 | +34 | 70 | |
| 4 | Dinamo 2007 Râmnicu Vâlcea | 34 | 19 | 7 | 8 | 83 | 50 | +33 | 64 | |
| 5 | Posada Perișani | 34 | 19 | 6 | 9 | 90 | 63 | +27 | 63 | |
| 6 | Cozia Călimănești | 34 | 18 | 9 | 7 | 90 | 44 | +46 | 63 | |
| 7 | Șirineasa | 34 | 18 | 7 | 9 | 78 | 44 | +34 | 61 | |
| 8 | Drăgășani | 34 | 17 | 7 | 10 | 71 | 41 | +30 | 58 | |
| 9 | Mihăești | 34 | 13 | 4 | 17 | 50 | 68 | −18 | 43 | |
| 10 | Băbeni | 34 | 13 | 3 | 18 | 52 | 70 | −18 | 42 | |
| 11 | Voința Orlești | 34 | 12 | 5 | 17 | 46 | 60 | −14 | 41 | |
| 12 | Oltețul Alunu | 34 | 11 | 5 | 18 | 53 | 97 | −44 | 38 | |
| 13 | Flacăra Horezu | 34 | 11 | 4 | 19 | 66 | 76 | −10 | 37 | |
| 14 | Lotru Brezoi | 34 | 11 | 3 | 20 | 44 | 72 | −28 | 36 | |
| 15 | Conexin Runcu (R) | 34 | 8 | 10 | 16 | 39 | 58 | −19 | 34 | Relegation to Liga V Vâlcea |
| 16 | Progresul Măldărești (R) | 34 | 8 | 5 | 21 | 68 | 108 | −40 | 29 | Relegation to Liga V Vâlcea |
| 17 | Nova Turist Râmnicu Vâlcea (R) | 34 | 9 | 1 | 24 | 50 | 122 | −72 | 25 (Note: Nova Turist Râmnicu Vâlcea deducted 3 points.) | Relegation to Liga V Vâlcea |
| 18 | Oltețul Bălcești (R) | 34 | 2 | 1 | 31 | 15 | 109 | −94 | 7 (Note: Oltețul Bălcești withdrew from championship and lost all remaining matches with 0–3.) | Relegation to Liga V Vâlcea |

Rules for classification: 1) Points; 2) Head-to-head points; 3) Head-to-head goal difference; 4) Head-to-head goals scored; 5) Head-to-head away goals scored; 6) Goal difference; 7) Goals scored.
(C) Champions; (Q) Qualified for the phase indicated; (R) Relegated

=== Vrancea County ===
Seria Nord

| Pos | Team | Pld | W | D | L | GF | GA | GD | Pts | Qualification or relegation |
|---|---|---|---|---|---|---|---|---|---|---|
| 1 | Adjud (Q) | 26 | 20 | 1 | 5 | 99 | 28 | +71 | 61 | Qualification to championship play-off |
| 2 | Avântul Jariștea (Q) | 26 | 18 | 4 | 4 | 82 | 25 | +57 | 58 | Qualification to championship play-off |
| 3 | Unirea Țifești (Q) | 26 | 18 | 2 | 6 | 66 | 27 | +39 | 56 | Qualification to championship play-off |
| 4 | Viitorul Homocea (Q) | 26 | 18 | 4 | 4 | 102 | 26 | +76 | 55 (Note: Viitorul Homocea, Siretul Suraia and Trotușul Ruginești deducted 3 points.) | Qualification to championship play-off |
| 5 | Foresta Broșteni | 26 | 16 | 3 | 7 | 56 | 33 | +23 | 51 | |
| 6 | Unirea Bolotești | 26 | 16 | 3 | 7 | 76 | 37 | +39 | 51 | |
| 7 | Unirea Pufești | 26 | 11 | 2 | 13 | 59 | 46 | +13 | 35 | |
| 8 | Chimica Mărășești | 26 | 10 | 4 | 12 | 48 | 38 | +10 | 34 | |
| 9 | Șoimii Năruja | 26 | 10 | 3 | 13 | 38 | 47 | −9 | 33 | |
| 10 | Siretul Suraia | 26 | 10 | 2 | 14 | 50 | 60 | −10 | 29 | |
| 11 | Voința Odobești | 26 | 8 | 2 | 16 | 43 | 59 | −16 | 26 | |
| 12 | Vulturul Păunești | 26 | 5 | 1 | 20 | 35 | 133 | −98 | 16 | |
| 13 | Trotusul Ruginești | 26 | 5 | 1 | 20 | 40 | 101 | −61 | 13 | |
| 14 | Ploscuțeni | 26 | 1 | 1 | 24 | 26 | 165 | −139 | 4 | |

Rules for classification: 1) Points; 2) Head-to-head points; 3) Head-to-head goal difference; 4) Head-to-head goals scored; 5) Head-to-head away goals scored; 6) Goal difference; 7) Goals scored.
(Q) Qualified for the phase indicated
Notes:

Seria Sud

| Pos | Team | Pld | W | D | L | GF | GA | GD | Pts | Qualification or relegation |
|---|---|---|---|---|---|---|---|---|---|---|
| 1 | Național Golești (Q) | 24 | 20 | 1 | 3 | 97 | 27 | +70 | 61 | Qualification to championship play-off |
| 2 | Flacăra Urechești (Q) | 24 | 17 | 2 | 5 | 71 | 23 | +48 | 53 | Qualification to championship play-off |
| 3 | Steaua Focșani (Q) | 24 | 13 | 7 | 4 | 62 | 30 | +32 | 46 | Qualification to championship play-off |
| 4 | Dinamo Tătăranu (Q) | 24 | 14 | 4 | 6 | 56 | 34 | +22 | 46 | Qualification to championship play-off |
| 5 | Câmpineanca | 24 | 13 | 3 | 8 | 49 | 37 | +12 | 42 | |
| 6 | Energia Vulturu | 24 | 12 | 3 | 9 | 57 | 42 | +15 | 39 | |
| 7 | Voința Cârligele | 24 | 10 | 5 | 9 | 44 | 50 | −6 | 35 | |
| 8 | Gloria Bălești | 24 | 11 | 2 | 11 | 38 | 61 | −23 | 35 | |
| 9 | Dumitrești | 24 | 8 | 2 | 14 | 28 | 47 | −19 | 26 | |
| 10 | Unirea Milcovul | 24 | 7 | 3 | 14 | 42 | 66 | −24 | 24 | |
| 11 | Victoria Gologanu | 24 | 5 | 5 | 14 | 33 | 66 | −33 | 20 | |
| 12 | Zorile Cotești | 24 | 5 | 0 | 19 | 33 | 63 | −30 | 15 | |
| 13 | Voința Slobozia Ciorăști | 24 | 2 | 1 | 21 | 13 | 80 | −67 | 7 | |

Rules for classification: 1) Points; 2) Head-to-head points; 3) Head-to-head goal difference; 4) Head-to-head goals scored; 5) Head-to-head away goals scored; 6) Goal difference; 7) Goals scored.
(Q) Qualified for the phase indicated

Championship play-off
Quarter-finals

| Team 1 | Score | Team 2 |
|---|---|---|
| Adjud | 8–1 | Dinamo Tătăranu |
| Flacăra Urechești | 7–1 | Unirea Țifești |
| Viitorul Homocea | 5–2 | Național Golești |
| Avântul Jariștea | 2–0 | Steaua Focșani |

Semi-finals

| Team 1 | Score | Team 2 |
|---|---|---|
| Flacăra Urechești | 1–0 | Viitorul Homocea |
| Avântul Jariștea | 1–3 | Adjud |

Final

| Team 1 | Score | Team 2 |
|---|---|---|
| Adjud | 2–1 | Flacăra Urechești |

Adjud won the Liga IV Vrancea County and qualify to promotion play-off in Liga III.

== See also ==
- 2009–10 Liga I
- 2009–10 Liga II
- 2009–10 Liga III
