= Alexandru Iordan =

Romanian footballer

Personal information
- Date of birth: 17 August 1988 (age 38)
- Place of birth: Pitești, Romania
- Height: 1.87 m (6 ft 2 in)
- Position: Goalkeeper

Team information
- Current team: Balotești
- Number: 13

Youth career
- FC Caracal

Senior career*
| Years | Team | Apps | (Gls) |
| 2005–2010 | FC Caracal | 4 | (0) |
| 2010–2013 | Turnu Severin | 4 | (0) |
| 2012 | → Ghecon Lăpușata (loan) | | |
| 2013 | Dinamo II București | 5 | (0) |
| 2013–2014 | Speranța Crihana Veche | 5 | (0) |
| 2014–2016 | Urban Titu | 12 | (0) |
| 2015 | Atletic Bradu | | |
| 2016 | SCM Pitești | | |
| 2016– 2021 | Balotești | 69 | (1) |
- * Club domestic league appearances and goals as of 30 April 2021

Alexandru Iordan (born 17 August 1988) is a Romanian professional footballer who plays as a goalkeeper.
