= AS Phoenix Ulmu =

Association football club in Romania

Phoenix Ulmu
- Full name: Asociația Sportivă; Phoenix Ulmu
- Short name: Ulmu
- Founded: 2005 (Elixir Ulmu); 2016 (Mostiștea Ulmu)
- Dissolved: 2024
- Ground: Comunal
- Capacity: 1,000
- Owner: Ulmu Commune
- 2023–24: Liga V, Călărași County, 1st (dissolved)
Home colours	Away colours

Asociația Sportivă Phoenix Ulmu, commonly known as Phoenix Ulmu, or simply as Ulmu, was a Romanian football club based in Ulmu, Călărași County. Founded in 2005 as Elixir Ulmu, the club situated on the banks of Mostiștea Lake reached the third tier on four occasions, a 2nd place being their best ranking.

== History ==
The club traces its roots back to an earlier local team from Ulmu, which was previously known as Mostiștea Ulmu and later as Dacia Ulmu, with which it was promoted to Divizia D – Călărași County, the first at county level and the fourth tier of the Romanian football league system at the end of the 2003–04 season. It was later reorganized as Elixir Ulmu in 2005, named after the company owned by Vasile Tîrșolea. In 2006, the club bought a place in Divizia C and was renamed Phoenix Ulmu. Assigned to Series II, Phoenix withdrew during the 2006–07 season and ranked 17th out of 18 teams.

Resuming activity in the fifth tier, Phoenix quickly returned to the Călărași County top level, and in the 2008–09 season, Phoenix won the Liga IV – Călărași County title under coach Adrian Cristea, but lost the promotion play-off 2–4 on neutral ground, at Marin Anastasovici Stadium, against Viscofil Popești-Leordeni, the Ilfov County champions. The squad comprised Constantin, Bidirean, Teodorescu, I. Savu, Dumitrache, D. Munteanu, M. Radu, Catană, Ghenu, Scăețeanu, Isar, Porumbel, M. Savu, Andrei and Nițu.

Under Cristea’s leadership, Phoenix won the county title again the following season and returned to the third tier after a promotion play-off against Nova Force Giurgiu, the Giurgiu County champions. The squad included Constantin, Tudor, Catană, Teodorescu, R. Vlad, I. Savu, Bold, M. Radu, Cotea, Andrei, Scăețeanu, M. Savu, Niculae, Nițu, Stan, D. Munteanu and Porumbel.

In the 2010–11 Liga III season, Phoenix Ulmu moved its home matches to Rocar Stadium in Bucharest, as the stadium in Ulmu did not meet the requirements for the third division. The campaign was marked by frequent coaching changes, beginning after promotion, when Marcel Abăluță was appointed head coach but left the position in September, being replaced by Tudorel Cristea, and about a month later Ionel Augustin took over the team. His tenure was also short-lived, as he was replaced during the winter break by Augustin Călin, who left just days before the start of the second half to work abroad in Algeria. Ionel Augustin subsequently returned to Phoenix Ulmu, leading the team to finish 9th in Series II, managing to avoid relegation.

At the start of the 2011–12 season, Phoenix Ulmu faced major challenges. The team moved to Romprim Stadium in Bucharest and, after eliminating Berceni from the Romanian Cup with a 3–2 win on 16 August 2011 under coach Ginel Nicoiu, they chose to withdraw from the championship after suffering a heavy 0–6 defeat against the same team in the first round one week later, disappearing from the Romanian football scene for two years.

Enrolled in 2013 in the Liga V – Călărași County, Phoenix Ulmu failed to stand out for the next years being ranked 6th and 4th, then was excluded from the league during the 2015–16 season due to financial problems. This second exclusion was also the last for Phoenix which was now officially dissolved.

Former logo, used between 2016 and 2021

In August 2016, Commune of Ulmu re-founded the football team under the name of Mostiștea Ulmu, name given after the Mostiștea Lake that is in the proximity of the locality. At short time after, the Romanian businessman and ex-owner of the team, Vasile Tîrșolea took the control of the football club and in only three seasons managed to promote the club from Liga V to Liga III, road that included a promotion play-off and a surprising victory against the better rated champion of Bucharest, historic club FC Carmen.

In 2021, Vasile Tîrșolea, owner of the club withdrew his financing and the club went back to Liga V, under the previous name, of Phoenix Ulmu.

== Grounds ==
Phoenix Ulmu plays its home matches on Ulmu Stadium in Ulmu, Călărași County, with a capacity of 1,000 seats. In the past the club also played its home matches on Rocar and Romprim Stadium, both in Bucharest, with a capacity of 2,000 seats and 2,500 seats. In 2020, for a short period, Mostiștea Ulmu plays its home matches on Ion Comșa Stadium in Călărași, with a capacity of 10,400 seats, then moved againin Bucharest, on Voința Sports Base, with a capacity of 2,500 seats.

== Honours ==
=== Leagues ===
Liga III

- Runners-up (2): 2019–20, 2020–21

Liga IV – Călărași County

- Winners (3): 2008–09, 2009–10, 2018–19

Liga V – Călărași County

- Winners (1): 2023–24
- Runners-up (1): 2016–17

=== Cups ===
Cupa României – Călărași County

- Winners (2): 2017–18, 2018–19

== Former managers ==
- (Romania) Adrian Cristea (2008–2010)
- (Romania) Marcel Abăluță (2010)
- (Romania) Tudorel Cristea (2010)
- (Romania) Ionel Augustin (2010–2011)
- (Romania) Augustin Călin (2011)
- (Romania) Mihai Ionescu (2018–2020)

== League and Cup history ==
Season	Tier	Division	Place	Cupa României
2020–21	3	Liga III (Seria III)	2nd (R)	
2019–20	3	Liga III (Seria II)	2nd	
2018–19	4	Liga IV (CL)	1st (C, P)	
2011–12	3	Liga III (Seria II)	16th (R)	

Season	Tier	Division	Place	Cupa României
2010–11	3	Liga III (Seria II)	9th	
2009–10	4	Liga IV (CL)	1st (C, P)	
2006–07	3	Liga III (Seria II)	17th (R)	
2005–06	4	Divizia D (CL)	1st (C, P)	
