= Augustin Călin =

Augustin Călin may refer to:

- Augustin Călin (footballer) (born 1973), Romanian football player
- Augustin Călin (football manager) (born 1980), Romanian football manager
