= Liga IV Călărași =

Fourth tier Romanian football league

- Founded: 1981
- Country: Romania
- Level on pyramid: 4
- Promotion to: Liga III
- Relegation to: Liga V Călărași
- Domestic cup: Cupa României – County phase
- Current champions: Spicul Vâlcelele (1st title) (2025–26)
- Most championships: Venus Independența (13 titles)
- Website: frf-ajf.ro/calarasi
- Current: 2025–26 Liga IV Călărași

Liga IV Călărași is one of the regional football divisions of Liga IV, the fourth tier of the Romanian football league system, for clubs based in Călărași County, and is organized by AJF Călărași – Asociația Județeană de Fotbal (lit. 'County Football Association').

It is contested by a variable number of teams, depending on the number of teams relegated from Liga III, the number of teams promoted from Liga V Călărași, and the teams that withdraw or enter the competition. The winner may or may not be promoted to Liga III, depending on the result of a promotion play-off contested against the winner of a neighboring county series.

== History ==
The Călărași County Championship was formed in 1981 and placed under the authority of the newly established Consiliul Județean pentru Educație Fizică și Sport (lit. 'County Council for Physical Education and Sports') in Călărași, following the new reorganization of the country of the country in February of that year. As part of this reform, the counties of Ilfov and Ialomița were divided, leading to the creation of the new counties of Călărași and Giurgiu.

Since then, the structure and organization of Călărași's main county competition, like those of other county championships, have undergone numerous changes. Between 1981 and 1992, it was known as Campionatul Județean (County Championship). In 1992, it was renamed Divizia C – Faza Județeană (Divizia C – County Phase), became Divizia D in 1997, and has been known as Liga IV since 2006.

== Promotion ==
The champions of each county association play against one another in a play-off to earn promotion to Liga III. Geographical criteria are taken into consideration when the play-offs are drawn. In total, there are 41 county champions plus the Bucharest municipal champion.

== List of champions ==
Ed.	Season	Winners
County Championship
1	1980–81	Victoria Lehliu
2	1981–82	ISCIP Ulmeni
3	1982–83	Victoria Lehliu
4	1983–84	Dunărea Grădiștea
5	1984–85	Unirea Mănăstirea
6	1985–86	Victoria Lehliu
7	1986–87	Oțelul Roșu Călărași
8	1987–88	Victoria Lehliu
9	1988–89	Înainte Modelu
10	1989–90	Victoria UJCC Călărași
11	1990–91	Sportul IACMRS Călărași
12	1991–92	Unirea Mănăstirea
Divizia C – County phase
13	1992–93	Sportul Chirnogi
14	1993–94	Dunărea Grădiștea
15	1994–95	Dunărea Grădiștea
16	1995–96	Navol Oltenița
17	1996–97	Ceres Ciocănești
Divizia D
18	1997–98	Sportul Drumu Subțire
19	1998–99	Unirea Mânăstirea
20	1999–00	Sportul Chirnogi
21	2000–01	Navol Oltenița
22	2001–02	Venus Independența
23	2002–03	Avântul Dor Mărunt
24	2003–04	Venus Independența
25	2004–05	Venus Independența
26	2005–06	Venus Independența

Ed.	Season	Winners
Liga IV
27	2006–07	Rapid Gălățui
28	2007–08	Dunărea Grădiștea
29	2008–09	Phoenix Ulmu
30	2009–10	Phoenix Ulmu
31	2010–11	Venus Independența
32	2011–12	Venus Independența
33	2012–13	Venus Independența
34	2013–14	Înainte Modelu
35	2014–15	Oltenița
36	2015–16	Venus Independența
37	2016–17	Agricola Borcea
38	2017–18	Venus Independența
39	2018–19	Mostiștea Ulmu
40	2019–20	Venus Independența
41	2020–21	Venus Independența
42	2021–22	Venus Independența
43	2022–23	Progresul Fundulea
44	2023–24	Venus Independența
45	2024–25	Gloria Fundeni
46	2025–26	Spicul Vâlcelele

== See also ==
=== Main Leagues ===
- Liga I
- Liga II
- Liga III
- Liga IV

=== County Leagues (Liga IV series) ===
North–East

- Liga IV Bacău
- Liga IV Botoșani
- Liga IV Iași
- Liga IV Neamț
- Liga IV Suceava
- Liga IV Vaslui

North–West

- Liga IV Bihor
- Liga IV Bistrița-Năsăud
- Liga IV Cluj
- Liga IV Maramureș
- Liga IV Satu Mare
- Liga IV Sălaj

Center

- Liga IV Alba
- Liga IV Brașov
- Liga IV Covasna
- Liga IV Harghita
- Liga IV Mureș
- Liga IV Sibiu

West

- Liga IV Arad
- Liga IV Caraș-Severin
- Liga IV Gorj
- Liga IV Hunedoara
- Liga IV Mehedinți
- Liga IV Timiș

South–West

- Liga IV Argeș
- Liga IV Dâmbovița
- Liga IV Dolj
- Liga IV Olt
- Liga IV Teleorman
- Liga IV Vâlcea

South

- Liga IV Bucharest
- Liga IV Călărași
- Liga IV Giurgiu
- Liga IV Ialomița
- Liga IV Ilfov
- Liga IV Prahova

South–East

- Liga IV Brăila
- Liga IV Buzău
- Liga IV Constanța
- Liga IV Galați
- Liga IV Tulcea
- Liga IV Vrancea
