= AS Athletic Comănești =

Athletic Comănești
- Full name: Asociația Sportivă Athletic Comănești
- Nickname(s): Leii albi (The White Lions)
- Short name: Athletic
- Founded: 2007; 18 years ago
- Dissolved: 2014; 11 years ago
- Ground: Rafinăria
- Capacity: 500
Home colours	Away colours

Asociația Sportivă Athletic 2007 Comănești, commonly known as Athletic Comănești, was a Romanian football club based in Comănești, Bacău County, founded in 2007 and dissolved in 2014.

== History ==
In 2007, in an attempt to revive football in Comănești, at the initiative of former footballers and several fans and with the support of local authorities and a group of friends from the Basque Country and concluding a partnership with Athletic Bilbao was founded Athletic 2007 Comănești.

Athletic played on its debut in Liga V – Bacău County, and after only one season, 2007–08, it managed to promote to Liga IV – Bacău County.
After the promotion, hit by the lack of interest from local authorities, the club are forced to move the team to the city of Dărmănești, and for the next two seasons, in which it finished on the following positions: 2008–09 – 6th and 2009–10 – 14th, the team name was AS Athletic 2007 Dărmănești.

In 2010, after Athletic Bilbao withdrew from the partnership and after the local authorities from Comănești returned to better feelings towards the club, Athletic returns to Comănești.

== League history ==
Season	Tier	Division	Place	Notes	Cupa României
2013–14	4	Liga IV (BC)	14th		
2012–13	4	Liga IV (BC)	14th		
2011–12	4	Liga IV (BC)	16th		
2010–11	4	Liga IV (BC)	13th		
2009–10	4	Liga IV (BC)	14th		
2008–09	4	Liga IV (BC)	6th		
2007–08	5	Liga V (BC)	3rd	Promoted	
