= AFC Progresul Fundulea =

Progresul Fundulea
- Full name: Asociația Fotbal Club; Progresul Fundulea
- Nicknames: Fundulenii (The People from Fundulea)
- Short name: Fundulea
- Founded: 2002; 24 years ago
- Ground: Progresul
- Capacity: 500
- Owner: Fundulea Town
- Chairman: Mihai Neagu
- Manager: Costin Lazăr
- League: Liga III
- 2025–26: Liga III, Seria III, 6th
- Website: https://progresulfundulea.ro/
Home colours	Away colours

Asociația Fotbal Club Progresul Fundulea, also known as Progresul Fundulea or simply Fundulea, is a Romanian football club based in Fundulea, Călărași County. The club currently plays in Liga III, the third tier of Romanian football league system, following promotion at the end of the 2022–23 season.

== History ==
Founded in 2002, Progresul Fundulea spent its entire history competing in the Călărași County championships, the fourth and fifth tiers of Romanian football.

Progresul earned promotion to Liga III at the end of the 2022–23 season, after winning Liga IV – Călărași County and defeating LPS HD Clinceni, winners of Liga IV – Ilfov County, 4–1 on aggregate.

In its debut season in Liga III, Progresul, under the leadership of coach Augustin Călin, finished 9th in Series III in both the regular season and the play-out round, and was relegated back to the fourth division. However, Fundulenii were spared from relegation due to the withdrawal of other teams.

Călin departed after five rounds of the 2024–25 campaign and was succeeded by former Romanian international Costin Lazăr, who made significant changes to strengthen the squad, bringing in eight new players during the winter break including Bogdan Ștefan, Daniel Târțău, Robert Stănici, Ștefan Coman, Mihai Badea, Adrian Perenyi, Mihai Popescu and Mario Abăluță. Under Lazăr’s guidance, Progresul Fundulea concluded the regular season in 4th place and secured 3rd place in the play-off round of Series III.

== Honours ==
Liga IV – Călărași County

- Winners (1): 2022–23
- Runners-up (3): 2010–11, 2011–12, 2021–22

Cupa României – Călărași County

- Winners (1): 2021–22

== League and Cup history ==
Season	Tier	Division	Place	Notes	Cupa României
2025–26	3	Liga III (Seria III)	TBD		Second round

Season	Tier	Division	Place	Notes	Cupa României
2024–25	3	Liga III (Seria III)	3rd		First round

== Former managers ==
- (Romania) Augustin Călin (2023–2024)
- (Romania) Costin Lazăr (2024–)
