= Augustin Călin (football manager) =

Romanian football manager (born 1980)

Personal information
- Date of birth: 1 August 1980 (age 46)
- Place of birth: Fundulea, Romania

Managerial career
- Years: Team
- 2006: Phoenix București (youth)
- 2006–2007: Naaba Kango (youth)
- 2007–2008: Yeleen Olympique
- 2010: Electroaparataj București
- 2010–2011: US Chaouia
- 2011: Phoenix Ulmu
- 2011–2012: US Chaouia
- 2012–2014: Comprest GIM București
- 2014–2015: ES Collo
- 2015–2016: Ramdane Djamel
- 2016–2017: USM Blida
- 2017: Balotești
- 2017: Mostiștea Ulmu
- 2017–2018: Balotești
- 2019: Oltenița
- 2019–2023: Balotești
- 2023–2024: Progresul Fundulea

Augustin Călin (born 1 August 1980) is a Romanian football manager.

== Manager career ==
As a manager, Augustin Călin is known better in Africa where he coached several teams as: Naaba Kango, from Burkina Faso, Yeleen Olympique from Mali, US Chaouia, ES Collo, Ramdane Djamel or USM Blida from Algeria.

In Romania he managed only lower division teams as: Electroaparataj, Phoenix Ulmu or Comprest GIM. With the last one he won Liga IV – Bucharest in 2014. On 27 February 2017 he was signed as the manager of Liga II team, Balotești.
