= CS Balotești =

Romanian football club

- Full name: Clubul Sportiv Balotești
- Founded: 2006; 19 years ago
- Ground: Central
- Capacity: 3,780
- Owner: Balotești Commune
- Chairman: Liviu Gulie
- League: not active at senior level
- 2022–23: Liga IV, Ilfov County, 20th of 20 (relegated)
Home colours	Away colours	Third colours

Clubul Sportiv Balotești, commonly known as CS Balotești or simply as Balotești, is a Romanian football club from Balotești, Ilfov County founded in 2006.

At the end of the 2013–14 Liga III season, the team gained promotion to Liga II, for the first time in their history.

== History ==
CS Balotești was founded in 2006 and played in Liga IV – Ilfov County until the summer of 2010.

In the 2009–10 season, led by Cristian Catană, CS Balotești finished 3rd in the Liga IV – Ilfov County play-off, but despite the fact that it failed to promote the club played in the next season of Liga III, obtained the place of CS Domnești.

In Liga III the team from Balotești had good results, never ending below 6th place and promoted at the end of 2013–14 season to Liga II.

First season of Liga II was a tough one for the club, especially because of the low budget, but it managed to achieve its goal by salvation from the relegation. 2015–16 was again a tough one but the team managed to win the relegation play-outs, ensuring a seat in Liga II for another year. 2016–17 season was also a very difficult one, because Liga II went to a single series with 20 teams. Some of them withdrew ongoing, but CS Balotești resisted both financially and sporty, ending on an honorable 13th place.

== Honours ==
Liga III

- Winners (1): 2013–14

== League history ==
Season	Tier	Division	Place	Notes	Cupa României
2020–21	3	Liga III (Seria IV)	10th	Relegated	
2019–20	3	Liga III (Seria III)	14th		
2018–19	2	Liga II	19th	Relegated	
2017–18	2	Liga II	13th		
2016–17	2	Liga II	13th		Round of 32
2015–16	2	Liga II (Seria I)	7th		Round of 32

Season	Tier	Division	Place	Notes	Cupa României
2014–15	2	Liga II (Seria I)	8th		
2013–14	3	Liga III (Seria III)	1st (C)	Promoted	
2012–13	3	Liga III (Seria III)	3rd		
2011–12	3	Liga III (Seria II)	7th		
2010–11	3	Liga III (Seria III)	7th		

== Former managers ==
- (Romania) Bogdan Pătrașcu (2015)
- (Romania) Augustin Călin (2017)
- (Romania) Laurențiu Diniță (2017)
- (Romania) Augustin Călin (2017–2018)
- (Romania) Emil Ursu (2018)
- (Romania) Gheorghe Mihali (2019)
