= Stadionul ANEFS =

Multi-purpose stadium in Bucharest, Romania

Coordinates: 44.39029°N 26.10344°E

- Interactive map of Stadionul ANEFS
- Former names: Autobuzul, Rocar
- Location: Bucharest, Romania
- Owner: ANEFS
- Capacity: 6,000
- Surface: grass

Construction
- Opened: 1960
- Renovated: 2001, 2008

Tenants
- Rocar București (1953–2009); Comprest GIM București (2011–present); Electrica București (2015–present)

ANEFS Stadium is a multi-purpose stadium in Bucharest, Romania. It is currently used mostly for football matches and is the home ground of Comprest GIM București and Electrica București. The stadium holds 7,500 people.

Built in 1960, the stadium was previously known as Autobuzul and later as Rocar, named after the Romanian bus manufacturer with the same name. However, it was renamed after ANEFS — Academia Națională de Educație Fizică și Sport (lit. 'National Academy of Physical Education and Sports') — acquired the stadium in 2003.
