= 2021–22 Liga IV =

80th season of Romanian football league

Liga IV
- Season: 2021–22

The 2021–22 Liga IV was the 80th season of Liga IV and the 54th since the 1968 administrative and territorial reorganization of the country, representing the fourth tier of the Romanian football league system. The champions of each county association played against one from a neighbouring county in a play-off for promotion to Liga III.

The counties were divided into seven regions, each consisting of six counties and the draw was made on 24 February 2022.

== County leagues ==
North–East

- Bacău (BC)
- Botoșani (BT)
- Iași (IS)
- Neamț (NT)
- Suceava (SV)
- Vaslui (VS)

North–West

- Bihor (BH)
- Bistrița-Năsăud (BN)
- Cluj (CJ)
- Maramureș (MM)
- Satu Mare (SM)
- Sălaj (SJ)

Center

- Alba (AB)
- Brașov (BV)
- Covasna (CV)
- Harghita (HR)
- Mureș (MS)
- Sibiu (SB)

West

- Arad (AR)
- Caraș-Severin (CS)
- Gorj (GJ)
- Hunedoara (HD)
- Mehedinți (MH)
- Timiș (TM)

South–West

- Argeș (AG)
- Dâmbovița (DB)
- Dolj (DJ)
- Olt (OT)
- Teleorman (TR)
- Vâlcea (VL)

South

- Bucharest (B)
- Călărași (CL)
- Giurgiu (GR)
- Ialomița (IL)
- Ilfov (IF)
- Prahova (PH)

South–East

- Brăila (BR)
- Buzău (BZ)
- Constanța (CT)
- Galați (GL)
- Tulcea (TL)
- Vrancea (VN)

== Promotion play-off ==
The matches were played on 18 and 25 June 2022.

Team 1	Agg.	Team 2	1st leg	2nd leg
Region 1 (North-East)				
Viitorul Darabani (BT)	6–4	(IS) Flacăra Erbiceni	5–0	1–4
Juniorul Suceava (SV)	0–1	(NT) Speranța Răucești	0–0	0–1
Sportul Onești (BC)	6–7	(VS) Rapid Brodoc	3–3	3–4
Region 2 (North-West)				
Rapid Jibou (SJ)	0–5	(MM) Sighetu Marmației	0–3	0–2
Viitorul Borș (BH)	w/o (Note: Viitorul Borș withdrew due to financial difficulties.)	(BN) Silvicultorul Maieru	w/o	w/o
Victoria Cluj (CJ)	1–4	(SM) Victoria Carei	1–1	0–3
Region 3 (Center)				
MSE 1898 Târgu Mureș (MS)	10–4	(HR) Gheorgheni	4–1	6–3
Olimpic Zărnești (BV)	3–2	(SB) Inter Sibiu	1–1	2–1
CSU Alba Iulia (AB)	18–3	(CV) Baraolt	11–2	7–1
Region 4 (West)				
Phoenix Buziaș (TM)	4–0	(GJ) Turceni	2–0	2–0
ACB Ineu (AR)	11–2	(MH) Recolta Dănceu	5–0	6–2
Retezatul Hațeg (HD)	4–1	(CS) Magica Balta Caransebeș	4–1	0–0
Region 5 (South-West)				
Oltul Curtișoara (OT)	3–3 (2–4 p)	(VL) Cozia Călimănești	3–1	0–2 (a.e.t.)
Dunărea Turris Turnu Măgurele (TR)	2–1	(DB) Roberto Ziduri	1–0	1–1
Dunărea Calafat (DJ)	1–2	(AG) Rucăr	1–1	0–1
Region 6 (South)				
Glina (IF)	4–5	(IL) Amara	3–2	1–3
Păulești (PH)	3–2	(GR) Victoria Adunații-Copăceni	0–1	3–1
Venus Independența (CL)	2–4	(B) Dinamo București	2–3	0–1
Region 7 (South-East)				
Voința Limpeziș (BZ)	5–3	(VN) Victoria Gugești	5–2	0–1
Victoria Traian (BR)	2–5	(GL) Unirea Braniștea	2–1	0–4
Viitorul Murighiol (TL)	w/o (Note: Viitorul Murighiol does not meet the minimum conditions for participation in the promotion play-off to Liga 3.)	(CT) Gloria Băneasa	w/o	w/o

== League standings ==
=== Alba County ===
Team changes from the 2019–20 season

- CS Ocna Mureș achieved promotion to the 2020–21 Liga III.
- Industria Galda was relegated from 2020–21 Liga III.
- AFC Micești and Nicolae Linca Cergău withdrew.
- Navobi Alba Iulia merged with GT Sport Alba Iulia, being absorbed by the second one.
- Hidromecanica Șugag, Kinder Teiuș and Târnavele Tiur were admitted upon request.

Pos	Team	Pld	W	D	L	GF	GA	GD	Pts	Qualification or relegation
1	CSU Alba Iulia (C, Q)	28	26	1	1	112	14	+98	79	Qualification to promotion play-off
2	Industria Galda	28	23	4	1	99	19	+80	73	
3	Viitorul Sântimbru	28	17	3	8	68	29	+39	54	
4	CIL Blaj	28	15	5	8	50	35	+15	50	
5	Energia Săsciori	28	15	3	10	88	52	+36	48	
6	Spicul Daia Romană	28	14	4	10	48	33	+15	46	
7	Performanța Ighiu	28	13	4	11	47	42	+5	43	
8	Voința Stremț	28	11	5	12	53	58	−5	38	
9	Olimpia Aiud	28	10	2	16	50	63	−13	32	
10	Viitorul Vama Seacă	28	9	5	14	33	63	−30	32	
11	Zlatna	28	8	5	15	51	68	−17	29	
12	Hidromecanica Șugag	28	7	7	14	53	92	−39	28	
13	Inter Unirea	28	7	4	17	67	91	−24	25	
14	Kinder Teiuș	28	5	1	22	43	114	−71	16	
15	GT Sport Alba Iulia	28	3	1	24	29	118	−89	10	Spared from relegation
16	Târnavele Tiur (Note: Târnavele Tiur withdrew after 3 rounds and all its results were canceled.) (D)	0	0	0	0	0	0	0	0	Withdrew

Rules for classification: 1) Points; 2) Head-to-head points; 3) Head-to-head goal difference; 4) Head-to-head goals scored; 5) Head-to-head away goals scored; 6) Goal difference; 7) Goals scored.
(C) Champions; (D) Disqualified; (Q) Qualified for the phase indicated

=== Arad County ===
Team changes from the previous season

- Frontiera Curtici achieved promotion to the Liga III.
- UTA Arad II withdrew.
- Podgoria Pâncota, CS Beliu and CS Glogovăț were reinstated from 2019–20 season.

Pos	Team	Pld	W	D	L	GF	GA	GD	Pts	Qualification
1	Socodor	18	13	2	3	45	21	+24	41	Qualification for the championship play-off
2	ACB Ineu	18	12	4	2	39	16	+23	40	Qualification for the championship play-off
3	Victoria Felnac	18	11	1	6	42	26	+16	34	Qualification for the championship play-off
4	Unirea Sântana	18	10	2	6	29	24	+5	32	Qualification for the championship play-off
5	Podgoria Pâncota	18	8	2	8	29	30	−1	26	Qualification for the championship play-out
6	Glogovăț	18	7	4	7	25	34	−9	25	Qualification for the championship play-out
7	Victoria Zăbrani	18	6	5	7	22	25	−3	23	Qualification for the championship play-out
8	Beliu	18	4	4	10	25	39	−14	16	Qualification for the championship play-out
9	Păulișana Păuliș	18	4	3	11	19	32	−13	15	Qualification for the championship play-out
10	Șoimii Șimand	18	1	1	16	14	42	−28	4	Qualification for the championship play-out

Rules for classification: 1) Points; 2) Head-to-head points; 3) Head-to-head goal difference; 4) Head-to-head goals scored; 5) Head-to-head away goals scored; 6) Goal difference; 7) Goals scored.

Championship play-off

The championship play-off was played in a double round-robin tournament between the best four teams of the regular season. The teams started the play-off with half of the points accumulated in the first stage of the season.

Pos	Team	Pld	W	D	L	GF	GA	GD	Pts	Qualification
1	ACB Ineu (C, Q)	6	3	1	2	17	9	+8	30	Qualification to promotion play-off
2	Socodor	6	3	0	3	11	14	−3	30	
3	Unirea Sântana	6	3	2	1	16	12	+4	27	
4	Victoria Felnac	6	1	1	4	9	18	−9	21	

Rules for classification: 1) Points; 2) Head-to-head points; 3) Head-to-head goal difference; 4) Head-to-head goals scored; 5) Head-to-head away goals scored; 6) Goal difference; 7) Goals scored.
(C) Champions; (Q) Qualified for the phase indicated

Championship play-out

The championship play-out was played in a single round-robin tournament between the teams ranked 5–10 in the regular season. The teams started the play-out with half of the points accumulated in the first stage of the season.

Pos	Team	Pld	W	D	L	GF	GA	GD	Pts
5	Podgoria Pâncota	5	3	1	1	12	5	+7	23
6	Păulișana Păuliș	5	4	1	0	13	5	+8	21
7	Beliu	5	2	2	1	10	11	−1	16
8	Victoria Zăbrani	5	0	3	2	4	7	−3	15
9	Glogovăț	5	0	1	4	2	11	−9	14
10	Șoimii Șimand	5	2	0	3	9	11	−2	8

Rules for classification: 1) Points; 2) Head-to-head points; 3) Head-to-head goal difference; 4) Head-to-head goals scored; 5) Head-to-head away goals scored; 6) Goal difference; 7) Goals scored.

=== Argeș County ===
Team changes from the 2019–20 season

- Voința Budeasa achieved promotion to the 2020–21 Liga III.
- Real Bradu was promoted to 2021–22 Liga III following the 2020–21 short tournament.
- Muscelul Lerești (North Series winners), Speed Academy Pitești (Center Series runners-up) and Energia Stolnici (Series South winners) were promoted from the 2019–20 Liga V Argeș.
- Viitorul Bârla (Center Series winners) was promoted from the 2020–21 Liga V Argeș.
- Muscelul Câmpulung was renamed Inter Câmpulung in the summer of 2020.
- Juventus Bascov was renamed Juventus Victoria 1992 Bascov.
- Vulturii Priboieni, AS Colibași, Gloria Berevoești, FC Argeș Pitești II, Basarabi Curtea de Argeș, CS Recea, Aripi Pitești and FC Dănuț Coman withdrew.
- ACS Bălilești was admitted upon request.

Pos	Team	Pld	W	D	L	GF	GA	GD	Pts	Qualification or relegation
1	Rucăr (C, Q)	28	24	1	3	127	26	+101	73	Qualification to promotion play-off
2	Inter Câmpulung	28	23	3	2	91	23	+68	72	
3	Mioveni II	28	18	6	4	88	35	+53	60	
4	Speed Academy Pitești	28	19	2	7	83	50	+33	59	
5	Victoria Buzoești	28	15	3	10	60	46	+14	48	
6	Poiana Lacului	28	13	5	10	71	64	+7	44	
7	Suseni	28	12	4	12	67	64	+3	40	
8	Viitorul Bârla	28	10	8	10	70	67	+3	38	
9	Energia Stolnici	28	12	2	14	61	58	+3	38	
10	Sporting Pitești	28	11	3	14	65	45	+20	36	
11	Costești	28	10	5	13	52	62	−10	35	
12	DLR Pitești	28	7	6	15	59	82	−23	27	
13	Muscelul Lerești	28	5	3	20	48	95	−47	18	
14	Juventus Victoria Bascov	28	4	3	21	38	99	−61	15	Spared from relegation
15	Bălilești	28	0	0	28	34	198	−164	0	Spared from relegation

Rules for classification: 1) Points; 2) Head-to-head points; 3) Head-to-head goal difference; 4) Head-to-head goals scored; 5) Head-to-head away goals scored; 6) Goal difference; 7) Goals scored.
(C) Champions; (Q) Qualified for the phase indicated

=== Bacău County ===
Team changes from the 2019–20 season

- Dinamo Bacău achieved promotion to the 2021–22 Liga III following the 2020–21 short tournament.
- AS Căiuți was renamed Viitorul Căiuți.
- Viitorul Curița entered in partnership with CSȘ Onești and was renamed Viitorul Curița/CSȘ Onești.
- FCM Bacău, Siretul Bacău, Aripile Cleja, Voința Oituz, Gloria Zemeș, CS Dofteana withdrew.
- Unirea Bacău, Siretu Săucești, Dinamo Bacău II, Viitorul Berești-Tazlău, Sportul Onești, Voința Brătești and Măgura Târgu Ocna were admitted upon request.

Series I

Pos	Team	Pld	W	D	L	GF	GA	GD	Pts	Qualification or relegation
1	Voința Gârleni	22	18	0	4	72	23	+49	54	Ineligible for promotion
2	Unirea Bacău	22	17	0	5	77	21	+56	51	Qualification to championship play-off
3	Siretu Săucești	22	15	4	3	51	21	+30	49	Qualification to championship play-off
4	Filipești	22	11	4	7	62	43	+19	37	
5	Faraoani	22	9	7	6	46	43	+3	34	
6	Flamura Roșie Sascut	22	9	3	10	59	53	+6	30	
7	Negri	22	8	6	8	36	35	+1	30	
8	Viitorul Nicolae Bălcescu	22	9	2	11	36	39	−3	29	
9	Dinamo Bacău II	22	6	3	13	34	51	−17	21	
10	Gauss Bacău	22	6	2	14	39	71	−32	20	
11	Rapid Bacău	22	3	4	15	30	64	−34	13	
12	Viitorul Berești-Tazlău	22	3	1	18	29	107	−78	10	

Rules for classification: 1) Points; 2) Head-to-head points; 3) Head-to-head goal difference; 4) Head-to-head goals scored; 5) Head-to-head away goals scored; 6) Goal difference; 7) Goals scored.

Series II

Pos	Team	Pld	W	D	L	GF	GA	GD	Pts	Qualification or relegation
1	Sportul Onești	22	20	2	0	101	8	+93	62	Qualification to championship play-off
2	Viitorul Curița/CSȘ Onești	22	18	1	3	95	16	+79	55	Qualification to championship play-off
3	Moinești	22	15	2	5	94	27	+67	47	
4	Uzu Dărmănești	22	15	2	5	64	33	+31	47	
5	Măgura Cașin	22	14	2	6	63	27	+36	44	
6	Bârsănești	22	11	4	7	62	37	+25	37	
7	Voința Brătești	22	9	3	10	57	61	−4	30	
8	Viitorul Urechești	22	6	2	14	34	85	−51	20	
9	Bradul Mânăstirea Cașin	22	6	1	15	41	71	−30	19	
10	Viitorul Căiuți	22	3	2	17	22	85	−63	11	
11	Măgura Târgu Ocna	22	2	1	19	22	134	−112	7	
12	Vulturul Măgirești	22	2	0	20	18	89	−71	6	

Rules for classification: 1) Points; 2) Head-to-head points; 3) Head-to-head goal difference; 4) Head-to-head goals scored; 5) Head-to-head away goals scored; 6) Goal difference; 7) Goals scored.

Championship play-off

The first two teams in each series of the regular season will meet once (3 matches per team). The teams start the Championship play-off with the points from the regular season accumulated with the teams ranked 1–9.

Pos	Team	Pld	W	D	L	GF	GA	GD	Pts	Qualification
1	Sportul Onești (C, Q)	3	3	0	0	73	7	+66	53	Qualification to promotion play-off
2	Siretu Săucești	3	2	0	1	46	23	+23	39	
3	Unirea Bacău	3	1	0	2	50	28	+22	39	
4	Viitorul Curița/CSȘ Onești (Note: Viitorul Curița/CSȘ Onești withdrew after first round and lost the remaining matches with 0–3.)	3	0	0	3	52	24	+28	37	

Rules for classification: 1) Points; 2) Head-to-head points; 3) Head-to-head goal difference; 4) Head-to-head goals scored; 5) Head-to-head away goals scored; 6) Goal difference; 7) Goals scored.
(C) Champions; (Q) Qualified for the phase indicated

=== Bihor County ===
Team changes from the 2019–20 season

- CA Oradea achieved promotion to the 2020–21 Liga III.
- Slovan Valea Cerului (Series I winners) was promoted from the 2019–20 Liga V Bihor.
- CSO Ștei, CSC Sânmartin II and CS Mădăras withdrew.
- CA Oradea II, Izvorul Cociuba Mare, Victoria Avram Iancu and Voința Ciumeghiu were admitted upon request.
- Unirea Livada was renamed Nojorid Livada.

Series I (North)

Pos	Team	Pld	W	D	L	GF	GA	GD	Pts	Qualification
1	Foresta Tileagd (Q)	14	11	2	1	29	14	+15	35	Qualification to championship play-off
2	Viitorul Borș (Q)	14	10	3	1	44	17	+27	33	Qualification to championship play-off
3	Diosig Bihardiószeg	14	7	2	5	34	22	+12	23	Qualification to championship play-out
4	Unirea Valea lui Mihai	14	7	2	5	33	21	+12	23	Qualification to championship play-out
5	Vulturii Săcueni	14	6	4	4	39	20	+19	22	Qualification to championship play-out
6	Crișul Aleșd	14	2	3	9	18	36	−18	9	Qualification to championship play-out
7	Slovan Valea Cerului	14	2	2	10	12	48	−36	8	Qualification to championship play-out
8	Oșorhei	14	1	2	11	12	43	−31	5	Qualification to championship play-out

Rules for classification: 1) Points; 2) Head-to-head points; 3) Head-to-head goal difference; 4) Head-to-head goals scored; 5) Head-to-head away goals scored; 6) Goal difference; 7) Goals scored.
(Q) Qualified for the phase indicated

Series II (South)

Pos	Team	Pld	W	D	L	GF	GA	GD	Pts	Qualification
1	Crișul Sântandrei (Q)	16	13	3	0	47	9	+38	42	Qualification to championship play-off
2	Nojorid Livada (Q)	16	9	5	2	27	12	+15	32	Qualification to championship play-off
3	Bihorul Beiuș	16	8	3	5	35	21	+14	27	Qualification to championship play-out
4	CA Oradea II	16	8	2	6	40	24	+16	26	Qualification to championship play-out
5	Universitatea Oradea	16	7	3	6	38	21	+17	24	Qualification to championship play-out
6	Olimpia Salonta	16	6	2	8	25	29	−4	20	Qualification to championship play-out
7	Victoria Avram Iancu	16	5	1	10	21	49	−28	16	Qualification to championship play-out
8	Voința Ciumeghiu	16	3	1	12	16	47	−31	10	Qualification to championship play-out
9	Izvorul Cociuba Mare (R)	16	2	2	12	20	57	−37	8	Relegation to Liga V Bihor

Rules for classification: 1) Points; 2) Head-to-head points; 3) Head-to-head goal difference; 4) Head-to-head goals scored; 5) Head-to-head away goals scored; 6) Goal difference; 7) Goals scored.
(Q) Qualified for the phase indicated; (R) Relegated

Championship play-off

The championship play-off was played between the first two teams from each series of the regular season in a double round-robin tournament and with no records from the regular season.

Pos	Team	Pld	W	D	L	GF	GA	GD	Pts	Qualification
1	Viitorul Borș (C, Q)	6	4	2	0	16	6	+10	14	Qualification to promotion play-off
2	Crișul Sântandrei	6	4	1	1	10	4	+6	13	
3	Foresta Tileagd	6	1	1	4	7	11	−4	4	
4	Nojorid Livada	6	1	0	5	5	17	−12	3	

Rules for classification: 1) Points; 2) Head-to-head points; 3) Head-to-head goal difference; 4) Head-to-head goals scored; 5) Head-to-head away goals scored; 6) Goal difference; 7) Goals scored.
(C) Champions; (Q) Qualified for the phase indicated

Championship play-out

The teams ranked 3rd to 8th in each series were played another round (5 matches) while maintaining the accumulated records.

Series I (North)

Pos	Team	Pld	W	D	L	GF	GA	GD	Pts
3	Vulturii Săcueni	5	5	0	0	20	3	+17	37
4	Diosig Bihardiószeg	5	4	0	1	26	11	+15	35
5	Unirea Valea lui Mihai	5	2	0	3	8	12	−4	29
6	Crișul Aleșd	5	2	0	3	17	17	0	15
7	Oșorhei	5	2	0	3	12	16	−4	11
8	Slovan Valea Cerului	5	0	0	5	3	27	−24	8

Rules for classification: 1) Points; 2) Head-to-head points; 3) Head-to-head goal difference; 4) Head-to-head goals scored; 5) Head-to-head away goals scored; 6) Goal difference; 7) Goals scored.

Series II (South)

Pos	Team	Pld	W	D	L	GF	GA	GD	Pts
3	Bihorul Beiuș	5	3	1	1	19	5	+14	37
4	CA Oradea II	5	2	2	1	17	8	+9	34
5	Universitatea Oradea	5	3	0	2	15	10	+5	33
6	Olimpia Salonta	5	3	1	1	14	10	+4	30
7	Victoria Avram Iancu	5	0	0	5	2	29	−27	16
8	Voința Ciumeghiu	5	1	2	2	9	14	−5	15

Rules for classification: 1) Points; 2) Head-to-head points; 3) Head-to-head goal difference; 4) Head-to-head goals scored; 5) Head-to-head away goals scored; 6) Goal difference; 7) Goals scored.

=== Bistrița-Năsăud County ===
Team changes from the 2019–20 season

- Voința Mărișelu, Săgeata Dumbrăvița, Real Teaca, Silvicultorul Maieru, Heniu Leșu, Minerul Rodna, Someșul Feldru and Someșul Reteag continued from the previous season.
- Progresul Năsăud, Atletico Monor, Voința Livezile, Progresul Tăure, Hebe Sângeorz-Băi, Eciro Forest Telciu and Someșul Rebrișoara withdrew.
- ACS Dumitra withdrew during the previous season.
- Venus Negrilești and Sportul Beclean were admitted upon request.

Pos	Team	Pld	W	D	L	GF	GA	GD	Pts	Qualification or relegation
1	Silvicultorul Maieru	18	17	1	0	92	29	+63	52	Qualification to championship play-off
2	Minerul Rodna	18	16	0	2	75	27	+48	48	Qualification to championship play-off
3	Someșul Reteag	18	13	0	5	57	39	+18	39	Qualification to championship play-off
4	Someșul Feldru	18	12	1	5	69	43	+26	37	Qualification to championship play-off
5	Săgeata Dumbrăvița	18	10	1	7	78	53	+25	31	
6	Sportul Beclean	18	7	1	10	41	52	−11	22	
7	Voința Mărișelu	18	4	2	12	33	56	−23	14	
8	Real Teaca	18	4	1	13	32	61	−29	13	
9	Heniu Leșu	18	2	1	15	22	92	−70	7	
10	Venus Negrilești	18	1	0	17	20	67	−47	3	

Rules for classification: 1) Points; 2) Head-to-head points; 3) Head-to-head goal difference; 4) Head-to-head goals scored; 5) Head-to-head away goals scored; 6) Goal difference; 7) Goals scored.

Championship play-off

The championship play-off was played in a single round-robin tournament between the best four teams of the regular season. The teams started the play-off with the points and goal difference carried over from the regular season.

Pos	Team	Pld	W	D	L	GF	GA	GD	Pts	Qualification
1	Silvicultorul Maieru (C, Q)	3	3	0	0	101	31	+70	61	Qualification to promotion play-off
2	Minerul Rodna	3	1	0	2	78	33	+45	51	
3	Someșul Feldru	3	2	0	1	77	46	+31	43	
4	Someșul Reteag (Note: Someșul Reteag withdrew and lost all matches from play-off with 0–3.)	3	0	0	3	57	48	+9	39	

Rules for classification: 1) Points; 2) Head-to-head points; 3) Head-to-head goal difference; 4) Head-to-head goals scored; 5) Head-to-head away goals scored; 6) Goal difference; 7) Goals scored.
(C) Champions; (Q) Qualified for the phase indicated

=== Botoșani County ===
Team changes from the 2019–20 season

- Dante Botoșani achieved promotion to the 2020–21 Liga III.
- Viitorul Albești, Independentul Darabani, Unirea Săveni, Flacăra Văculești, Rapid Ungureni and Sportivul Trușești withdrew.
- Șoimii Bălușeni, Nord Star Pomârla, Viitorul Broscăuți, Sporting Darabani and Unirea Stăuceni were admitted upon request.
- TransDor Tudora was renamed Partizanul Tudora.

Pos	Team	Pld	W	D	L	GF	GA	GD	Pts	Qualification or relegation
1	Sporting Darabani (C, Q)	22	19	2	1	120	15	+105	59	Qualification to promotion play-off
2	Unirea Curtești	22	17	1	4	88	22	+66	52	
3	Bucecea	22	15	2	5	66	43	+23	47	
4	Inter Dorohoi	22	12	4	6	72	26	+46	40	
5	Unirea Stăuceni	22	12	3	7	80	52	+28	39	
6	Flacăra 1907 Flămânzi	22	10	4	8	70	55	+15	34	
7	Partizanul Tudora	22	10	3	9	53	50	+3	33	
8	Voința Șendriceni	22	9	3	10	54	65	−11	30	
9	Prosport Vârfu Câmpului	22	5	5	12	38	60	−22	20	
10	Viitorul Broscăuți	22	3	3	16	27	106	−79	12	
11	Nord Star Pomârla	22	2	4	16	39	84	−45	10	
12	Șoimii Bălușeni	22	0	2	20	20	149	−129	2	

Rules for classification: 1) Points; 2) Head-to-head points; 3) Head-to-head goal difference; 4) Head-to-head goals scored; 5) Head-to-head away goals scored; 6) Goal difference; 7) Goals scored.
(C) Champions; (Q) Qualified for the phase indicated

=== Brașov County ===
Team changes from the 2019–20 season

- Corona Brașov was promoted to 2020–21 Liga III.
- Carpați Berivoi withdrew during the previous season.
- Precizia Săcele, AFC Hărman and Cetatea Homorod withdrew.
- Weidenbach Ghimbav, Bucegi Moieciu, CSM Făgăraș and ACS Hoghiz were admitted upon request.

Pos	Team	Pld	W	D	L	GF	GA	GD	Pts	Qualification or relegation
1	Olimpic Zărnești (C, Q)	28	25	2	1	96	19	+77	77	Qualification to promotion play-off
2	Codlea	28	19	6	3	86	27	+59	63	
3	Cetățenii Ghimbav	28	17	6	5	67	35	+32	57	
4	Weidenbach Ghimbav	28	18	2	8	80	40	+40	56	
5	Ciucaș Tărlungeni	28	16	7	5	53	15	+38	55	
6	Inter Cristian	28	14	7	7	65	46	+19	49	
7	Steagu Roșu Brașov	28	12	4	12	61	43	+18	40	
8	Aripile Brașov	28	11	4	13	67	65	+2	37	
9	Prejmer	28	10	5	13	50	52	−2	35	
10	Prietenii Rupea	28	10	3	15	47	75	−28	33	
11	Bucegi Moieciu	28	9	3	16	61	86	−25	30	
12	Făgăraș	28	7	5	16	59	82	−23	26	
13	Hoghiz	28	4	5	19	28	93	−65	17	
14	Chimia Victoria	28	4	1	23	23	99	−76	13	
15	Colțea Brașov	28	4	0	24	20	86	−66	12 (Note: Colțea Brașov withdrew after 15 rounds and lost all matches from second part of the season with 0–3.)	Relegation to Liga V Brașov
16	Olimpic Voila (D)	0	0	0	0	0	0	0	0 (Note: Olimpic Voila was excluded after 11 rounds and all its results were canceled.)	Excluded

Rules for classification: 1) Points; 2) Head-to-head points; 3) Head-to-head goal difference; 4) Head-to-head goals scored; 5) Head-to-head away goals scored; 6) Goal difference; 7) Goals scored.
(C) Champions; (D) Disqualified; (Q) Qualified for the phase indicated

=== Brăila County ===
Team changes from the 2019–20 season

- Sportul Chiscani achieved promotion to the 2020–21 Liga III.
- Voința Plopu, Pandurii Tudor Vladimirescu, Dacia Unirea Brăila II and Dinamic Unirea withdrew.
- Daous Dava 2018 Brăila was admitted upon request.

Pos	Team	Pld	W	D	L	GF	GA	GD	Pts	Qualification or relegation
1	Victoria Traian	20	17	1	2	88	13	+75	52	Qualification to championship play-off
2	Viitorul Șuțești	20	16	2	2	68	18	+50	50	Qualification to championship play-off
3	Voința Vișani	20	13	1	6	56	34	+22	40	Qualification to championship play-off
4	Comunal Cazasu	20	5	1	14	31	56	−25	16	Qualification to championship play-out
5	Daous Dava 2018 Brăila	20	4	0	16	26	87	−61	12	Qualification to championship play-out
6	Dacia Bertești (Note: Dacia Bertești withdrew after 14 rounds and lost all remaining matches with 0–3.)	20	2	1	17	15	76	−61	7	Qualification to championship play-out
7	Viitorul Însurăței (Note: Viitorul Însurăței withdrew after 3 rounds and all its results were canceled.) (D)	0	0	0	0	0	0	0	0	Withdrew

Rules for classification: 1) Points; 2) Head-to-head points; 3) Head-to-head goal difference; 4) Head-to-head goals scored; 5) Head-to-head away goals scored; 6) Goal difference; 7) Goals scored.
(D) Disqualified
Notes:

Championship play-off

In the championship play-off each team plays every other team twice. Teams start the play-off round with their points from the regular season halved, rounded upwards, and no other records carried over from the regular season.

Pos	Team	Pld	W	D	L	GF	GA	GD	Pts	Qualification
1	Victoria Traian (C, Q)	4	2	2	0	15	8	+7	34	Qualification to promotion play-off
2	Viitorul Șuțești	4	2	1	1	19	8	+11	32	
3	Voința Vișani	4	0	1	3	9	27	−18	21	

Rules for classification: 1) Points; 2) Head-to-head points; 3) Head-to-head goal difference; 4) Head-to-head goals scored; 5) Head-to-head away goals scored; 6) Goal difference; 7) Goals scored.
(C) Champions; (Q) Qualified for the phase indicated

Championship play-out

In the championship play-out each team plays every other team twice. Teams start the play-out round with their points from the regular season halved, rounded upwards, and no other records carried over from the regular season.

Pos	Team	Pld	W	D	L	GF	GA	GD	Pts	Relegation
4	Comunal Cazasu	4	4	0	0	15	4	+11	20	
5	Daous Dava 2018 Brăila	4	2	0	2	10	9	+1	12	
6	Dacia Bertești (Note: Dacia Bertești withdrew after 14 rounds in the regular season and lost all remaining matches with 0–3.) (R)	4	0	0	4	0	12	−12	4	Relegation to Liga V Brăila

Rules for classification: 1) Points; 2) Head-to-head points; 3) Head-to-head goal difference; 4) Head-to-head goals scored; 5) Head-to-head away goals scored; 6) Goal difference; 7) Goals scored.
(R) Relegated

=== Bucharest ===
Team changes from the 2019–20 season

- Steaua București achieved promotion to the 2020–21 Liga III.
- Rapid București II, Bucharest United, Comprest GIM București, Power Team București, AFC Rapid București, Electrica București, Unirea Politehnica București and Victoria București withdrew.
- Dinamo București, Știința București, Daco-Getica București, Sportul D&A București, Dan Chilom București, Pro Team București and Metropolitan Fotbal & Motor Club București were admitted upon request.

Pos	Team	Pld	W	D	L	GF	GA	GD	Pts	Qualification or relegation
1	Dinamo București	26	20	2	4	83	27	+56	62	Qualification to championship play-off
2	Progresul 2005 București	26	18	5	3	120	37	+83	59	Qualification to championship play-off
3	Rapid FNG București	26	15	5	6	68	37	+31	50	Qualification to championship play-off
4	Metaloglobus București II	26	15	4	7	69	44	+25	49	Qualification to championship play-off
5	Sportivii București	26	14	6	6	68	48	+20	48	
6	Știința București	26	13	4	9	77	53	+24	43	
7	Daco-Getica București	26	13	4	9	68	46	+22	43	
8	ACS FC Dinamo București	26	12	6	8	77	48	+29	42	
9	Romprim București	26	10	5	11	57	55	+2	35	
10	Sportul D&A București	26	8	4	14	46	72	−26	28	
11	Dan Chilom București	26	6	4	16	33	57	−24	22	
12	Asalt București	26	6	4	16	50	91	−41	22	
13	Pro Team București	26	4	2	20	44	94	−50	14	Spared from relegation
14	Metropolitan Fotbal & Motor Club București (R)	26	0	1	25	21	172	−151	1	Relegation to Liga V Bucharest

Rules for classification: 1) Points; 2) Head-to-head points; 3) Head-to-head goal difference; 4) Head-to-head goals scored; 5) Head-to-head away goals scored; 6) Goal difference; 7) Goals scored.
(R) Relegated

Championship play-off

The championship play-off was played in a single round-robin tournament between the best four teams of the regular season. Depending on the place occupied in the regular season, the teams started the play-off with the following points: 1st place – 3 points, 2nd place – 2 points, 3rd place – 1 point, 4th place – 0 points. All matches were played at Romprim Stadium in Bucharest on 21, 28 May and 4 June 2022.

Pos	Team	Pld	W	D	L	GF	GA	GD	Pts	Qualification
1	Dinamo București (C, Q)	3	3	0	0	6	0	+6	12	Qualification to promotion play-off
2	Progresul 2005 București	3	2	0	1	9	3	+6	8	
3	Metaloglobus București II	3	1	0	2	5	10	−5	3	
4	Rapid FNG București	3	0	0	3	0	7	−7	1	

Rules for classification: 1) Points; 2) Head-to-head points; 3) Head-to-head goal difference; 4) Head-to-head goals scored; 5) Head-to-head away goals scored; 6) Goal difference; 7) Goals scored.
(C) Champions; (Q) Qualified for the phase indicated

=== Buzău County ===
Team changes from the 2019–20 season

- CSM Râmnicu Sărat achieved promotion to the 2020–21 Liga III.
- Avântul Zărnești, Locomotiva Buzău, Diadema Gherăseni, Recolta Blăjani and Înfrățirea Zoița withdrew.
- Pescărușul Luciu, Energia Clondiru, Voința Balta Albă, Metalul Buzău II, CSM Râmnicu Sărat II, Știința Cernătești and Progresul Beceni were admitted upon request.
- Fortius-Partizanul Merei was renamed Partizanul Merei.

Series I

Pos	Team	Pld	W	D	L	GF	GA	GD	Pts	Qualification
1	Team Săgeata	16	12	2	2	54	21	+33	38	Qualification to championship play-off
2	Voința Limpeziș	16	12	2	2	61	19	+42	38	Qualification to championship play-off
3	Montana Pătârlagele	16	11	2	3	40	22	+18	35	Qualification to championship play-off
4	Pescărușul Luciu	16	10	1	5	52	26	+26	31	Qualification to championship play-off
5	Unirea Stâlpu	16	8	0	8	32	47	−15	24	Qualification to championship play-out
6	Viitorul Berca	16	5	3	8	36	31	+5	18	Qualification to championship play-out
7	Energia Clondiru	16	4	0	12	25	59	−34	12	Qualification to championship play-out
8	Șoimii Siriu	16	3	0	13	19	63	−44	9	Qualification to championship play-out
9	Săhăteni Vintileanca	16	2	0	14	14	45	−31	6	Qualification to championship play-out

Rules for classification: 1) Points; 2) Head-to-head points; 3) Head-to-head goal difference; 4) Head-to-head goals scored; 5) Head-to-head away goals scored; 6) Goal difference; 7) Goals scored.

Series II

Pos	Team	Pld	W	D	L	GF	GA	GD	Pts	Qualification
1	Gloria Vadu Pașii	18	12	3	3	69	25	+44	39	Qualification to championship play-off
2	Voința Lanurile	18	12	2	4	45	18	+27	38	Qualification to championship play-off
3	Phoenix Poșta Câlnău	18	11	4	3	46	27	+19	37	Qualification to championship play-off
4	Voința Balta Albă	18	11	2	5	58	20	+38	35	Qualification to championship play-off
5	Metalul Buzău II	18	9	2	7	46	42	+4	29	Qualification to championship play-out
6	Râmnicu Sărat II	18	8	3	7	43	31	+12	27	Qualification to championship play-out
7	Știința Cernătești	18	7	3	8	46	34	+12	24	Qualification to championship play-out
8	Progresul Beceni	18	4	3	11	27	59	−32	15	Qualification to championship play-out
9	Partizanul Merei (D)	17	2	1	14	11	86	−75	7 (Note: Partizanul Merei was excluded after 12 rounds and lost all the remaining matches with 0–3.)	
10	Recolta Sălcioara (D)	17	1	1	15	12	61	−49	4 (Note: Recolta Sălcioara was excluded after 8 rounds and lost all the remaining matches with 0–3.)	

Rules for classification: 1) Points; 2) Head-to-head points; 3) Head-to-head goal difference; 4) Head-to-head goals scored; 5) Head-to-head away goals scored; 6) Goal difference; 7) Goals scored.
(D) Disqualified
Notes:

Championship play-off

The championship play-off was played between the best four teams from each series of the regular season. Depending on the place occupied in the regular season, the teams started the play-off with the following points: 1st place - 3 points, 2nd place - 2 points, 3rd place - 1 point, 4th place - 0 points.

Pos	Team	Pld	W	D	L	GF	GA	GD	Pts	Qualification
1	Voința Limpeziș (C, Q)	14	12	1	1	49	20	+29	39	Qualification to promotion play-off
2	Team Săgeata	14	9	1	4	32	17	+15	32	
3	Voința Lanurile	14	8	1	5	40	25	+15	27	
4	Montana Pătârlagele	14	6	4	4	37	33	+4	23	
5	Voința Balta Albă	14	6	2	6	27	23	+4	20	
6	Pescărușul Luciu	14	5	1	8	35	49	−14	16	
7	Gloria Vadu Pașii	14	2	0	12	19	49	−30	10	
8	Phoenix Poșta Câlnău	14	2	2	10	16	39	−23	9	

Rules for classification: 1) Points; 2) Head-to-head points; 3) Head-to-head goal difference; 4) Head-to-head goals scored; 5) Head-to-head away goals scored; 6) Goal difference; 7) Goals scored.
(C) Champions; (Q) Qualified for the phase indicated

Championship play-out

Depending on the place occupied in the regular season, the teams started the play-out with the following points: 5th place - 5 points, 6th place - 3 points, 7th place - 2 points, 8th place - 1 point, 9th place - 0 points.

Pos	Team	Pld	W	D	L	GF	GA	GD	Pts	Relegation
9	Știința Cernătești	8	7	0	1	20	5	+15	23	
10	Viitorul Berca	8	5	1	2	16	9	+7	19	
11	Metalul Buzău II	8	4	0	4	15	16	−1	17	
12	Șoimii Siriu	8	4	1	3	15	21	−6	14	
13	Progresul Beceni	8	4	1	3	21	20	+1	14	
14	Unirea Stâlpu	8	2	2	4	17	15	+2	13	
15	Râmnicu Sărat II	8	3	1	4	13	19	−6	13	
16	Energia Clondiru (R)	8	2	2	4	14	15	−1	10	Relegation to Liga V Buzău
17	Săhăteni Vintileanca (R)	8	1	0	7	7	18	−11	3	Relegation to Liga V Buzău

Rules for classification: 1) Points; 2) Head-to-head points; 3) Head-to-head goal difference; 4) Head-to-head goals scored; 5) Head-to-head away goals scored; 6) Goal difference; 7) Goals scored.
(R) Relegated

=== Caraș-Severin County ===
Team changes from the 2019–20 season

- Progresul Ezeriș achieved promotion to the 2020–21 Liga III.
- Voința Lupac achieved promotion to the 2021–22 Liga III following the 2020–21 short tournament.
- Metalul Bocșa, Croația Clocotici, Steaua Prigor, Ad Mediam Mehadia, Era S Comexim Caransebeș, Agmonia Zăvoi and Bistra Glimboca withdrew.
- Banatul Ocna de Fier, Recolta Rafnic and Mundo Reșița were admitted upon request.
- Șoimii Oțelu Roșu was renamed CS Oțelu Roșu.

Pos	Team	Pld	W	D	L	GF	GA	GD	Pts	Qualification or relegation
1	Magica Balta Caransebeș (C, Q)	22	19	2	1	84	17	+67	59	Qualification to promotion play-off
2	Anina	22	18	1	3	107	30	+77	55	
3	Banatul Ocna de Fier	22	15	1	6	70	35	+35	46	
4	Slatina-Timiș	22	12	1	9	73	40	+33	37	
5	Rapid Buchin	22	12	1	9	69	56	+13	37	
6	Oravița	22	11	3	8	67	45	+22	36	
7	Nera Bozovici	22	10	2	10	51	52	−1	32	
8	Moldova Nouă	22	8	5	9	46	46	0	29	
9	Oțelu Roșu	22	7	2	13	57	74	−17	23	
10	Recolta Rafnic	22	4	3	15	66	81	−15	15	
11	Foresta Armeniș	22	3	0	19	29	154	−125	9	
12	Mundo Reșița	22	2	1	19	31	120	−89	7	

Rules for classification: 1) Points; 2) Head-to-head points; 3) Head-to-head goal difference; 4) Head-to-head goals scored; 5) Head-to-head away goals scored; 6) Goal difference; 7) Goals scored.
(C) Champions; (Q) Qualified for the phase indicated

=== Călărași County ===
Team changes from the 2019–20 season season

- CSM Oltenița achieved promotion to the 2020–21 Liga III.
- Viitorul Curcani and Vulturii Gălbinași withdrew.
- Progresul Perișoru, Rapid Ulmeni and Șoimii Progresu were admitted upon request.

Series A

Pos	Team	Pld	W	D	L	GF	GA	GD	Pts	Qualification
1	Venus Independența	16	13	2	1	89	15	+74	41	Qualification to championship play-off
2	Dunărea Ciocănești	16	11	4	1	84	14	+70	37	Qualification to championship play-off
3	Dunărea Grădiștea	16	10	4	2	51	11	+40	34	Qualification to championship play-off
4	Roseți	16	9	2	5	61	20	+41	29	Qualification to championship play-off
5	Spicul Vâlcelele	16	9	1	6	45	39	+6	28	Qualification to championship play-out
6	Tricolorul Jegălia	16	6	0	10	32	42	−10	18	Qualification to championship play-out
7	Unirea Dragalina	16	4	1	11	26	79	−53	13	Qualification to championship play-out
8	Progresul Perișoru	16	2	0	14	16	90	−74	6	Qualification to championship play-out
9	Conpet Ștefan cel Mare	16	1	0	15	15	109	−94	3	Qualification to championship play-out

Rules for classification: 1) Points; 2) Head-to-head points; 3) Head-to-head goal difference; 4) Head-to-head goals scored; 5) Head-to-head away goals scored; 6) Goal difference; 7) Goals scored.

Series B

Pos	Team	Pld	W	D	L	GF	GA	GD	Pts	Qualification
1	Progresul Fundulea	16	12	2	2	62	19	+43	38	Qualification to championship play-off
2	Partizan Crivăț	16	11	4	1	63	28	+35	37	Qualification to championship play-off
3	Unirea Mânăstirea	16	7	5	4	41	32	+9	26	Qualification to championship play-off
4	Rapid Ulmeni	16	5	6	5	30	36	−6	21	Qualification to championship play-off
5	Steaua Radovanu	16	6	2	8	31	35	−4	20	Qualification to championship play-out
6	Victoria Chirnogi	16	5	5	6	29	33	−4	20	Qualification to championship play-out
7	Victoria Lehliu	16	6	2	8	30	50	−20	20	Qualification to championship play-out
8	Șoimii Progresu	16	3	1	12	33	57	−24	10	Qualification to championship play-out
9	Petrolul Ileana	16	3	1	12	28	57	−29	10	Qualification to championship play-out

Rules for classification: 1) Points; 2) Head-to-head points; 3) Head-to-head goal difference; 4) Head-to-head goals scored; 5) Head-to-head away goals scored; 6) Goal difference; 7) Goals scored.

Championship play-off

The teams started the play-off with all the records from the regular season.

Series A

Pos	Team	Pld	W	D	L	GF	GA	GD	Pts	Qualification
1	Venus Independența (Q)	22	17	3	2	109	25	+84	54	Qualification to championship final
2	Dunărea Ciocănești	22	12	6	4	94	32	+62	42	
3	Dunărea Grădiștea	22	11	7	4	62	24	+38	40	
4	Roseți	22	11	4	7	74	33	+41	37	

Rules for classification: 1) Points; 2) Head-to-head points; 3) Head-to-head goal difference; 4) Head-to-head goals scored; 5) Head-to-head away goals scored; 6) Goal difference; 7) Goals scored.
(Q) Qualified for the phase indicated

Series B

Pos	Team	Pld	W	D	L	GF	GA	GD	Pts	Qualification
1	Progresul Fundulea (Q)	22	16	2	4	77	25	+52	50	Qualification to championship final
2	Partizan Crivăț	22	14	4	4	75	39	+36	46	
3	Unirea Mânăstirea	22	9	5	8	51	46	+5	32	
4	Rapid Ulmeni	22	8	6	8	37	49	−12	30	

Rules for classification: 1) Points; 2) Head-to-head points; 3) Head-to-head goal difference; 4) Head-to-head goals scored; 5) Head-to-head away goals scored; 6) Goal difference; 7) Goals scored.
(Q) Qualified for the phase indicated

Championship play-out

The teams started the play-out with all the records from the regular season.

Series A

Pos	Team	Pld	W	D	L	GF	GA	GD	Pts	Relegation
5	Spicul Vâlcelele	23	13	2	8	66	51	+15	41	
6	Unirea Dragalina	23	9	2	12	53	89	−36	29	
7	ATricolorul Jegălia	23	9	0	14	59	57	+2	27	
8	Progresul Perișoru	24	4	1	19	29	114	−85	13	
9	Conpet Ștefan cel Mare (R)	23	3	1	19	21	142	−121	10	Relegation to Liga V Călărași

Updated to match(es) played on 18 June 2022. Source:
Rules for classification: 1) Points; 2) Head-to-head points; 3) Head-to-head goal difference; 4) Head-to-head goals scored; 5) Head-to-head away goals scored; 6) Goal difference; 7) Goals scored.
(R) Relegated

Series B

Pos	Team	Pld	W	D	L	GF	GA	GD	Pts	Relegation
5	Steaua Radovanu	22	10	3	9	49	44	+5	33	
6	Victoria Chirnogi	22	6	8	8	47	53	−6	26	
7	Petrolul Ileana	22	7	1	14	51	77	−26	22	
8	Victoria Lehliu	22	6	4	12	37	67	−30	22	
9	Șoimii Progresu (Note: Șoimii Progresu withdrew before the start of the play-out.) (D)	16	3	1	12	33	57	−24	10	Relegation to Liga V Călărași

Rules for classification: 1) Points; 2) Head-to-head points; 3) Head-to-head goal difference; 4) Head-to-head goals scored; 5) Head-to-head away goals scored; 6) Goal difference; 7) Goals scored.
(D) Disqualified
Notes:

Championship final

Team 1	Score	Team 2
Venus Independența	3–2	Progresul Fundulea

Venus Independența won the Liga IV Călărași County and qualified for the promotion play-off in Liga III.

=== Cluj County ===
Team changes from the 2019–20 season

- Someșul Dej joined to 2020–21 Liga III benefiting from the withdrawal of Voința Budeasa.
- CSM Câmpia Turzii and CFR Dej withdrew.
- Viitorul Poieni, Someșul Dej II and Academia Florești were admitted upon request.

Pos	Team	Pld	W	D	L	GF	GA	GD	Pts	Qualification or relegation
1	Supporter 2.0 Cluj-Napoca (C, Q)	24	18	3	3	96	23	+73	57	Qualification for the promotion play-off
2	Arieșul Mihai Viteazu	24	16	3	5	70	33	+37	51	
3	Unirea Iclod	24	16	2	6	90	52	+38	50	
4	Victoria Viișoara	24	14	4	6	59	36	+23	46	
5	Florești	24	13	2	9	65	48	+17	41	
6	Unirea Tritenii de Jos	24	13	2	9	60	45	+15	41	
7	Atletic Olimpia Gherla	24	11	2	11	57	44	+13	35	
8	Sporting Apahida	24	10	5	9	71	72	−1	35	
9	Viitorul Poieni	24	10	2	12	57	77	−20	32	
10	Someșul Dej II	24	5	3	16	29	64	−35	18	
11	Someșul Gilău	24	5	3	16	33	71	−38	18	
12	Viitorul Gârbău	24	5	1	18	37	95	−58	16	
13	Academia Florești	24	4	0	20	41	105	−64	12	Relegation to Liga V Cluj
14	Vulturul Mintiu Gherlii (D)	0	0	0	0	0	0	0	0 (Note: Vulturul Mintiu Gherlii was excluded after 12 rounds and all its results were canceled.)	Excluded

Rules for classification: 1) Points; 2) Head-to-head points; 3) Head-to-head goal difference; 4) Head-to-head goals scored; 5) Head-to-head away goals scored; 6) Goal difference; 7) Goals scored.
(C) Champions; (D) Disqualified; (Q) Qualified for the phase indicated

=== Constanța County ===
Team changes from the 2019–20 season

- Gloria Albești achieved promotion to the 2020–21 Liga III.
- Poseidon Limanu-2 Mai and CS Medgidia withdrew during the 2019–20 Liga III.
- Axiopolis Cernavodă withdrew at the end of the 2020–21 Liga III season and took the place of its second team, Axiopolis Cernavodă II.
- Viitorul Fântânele, CS Lipnița-Carvăn and CS Eforie withdrew.
- Viitorul Hârșova and Viitorul Cobadin were admitted upon request.
- CS Cumpăna was renamed Victoria Cumpăna.

Pos	Team	Pld	W	D	L	GF	GA	GD	Pts	Qualification or relegation
1	Gloria Băneasa (C, Q)	34	29	3	2	144	18	+126	90	Qualification to promotion play-off
2	Medgidia	34	27	3	4	109	41	+68	84	
3	Poseidon Limanu-2 Mai	34	26	3	5	122	32	+90	81	
4	Năvodari	34	26	2	6	113	43	+70	80	
5	Ovidiu	34	21	1	12	105	71	+34	64	
6	Agigea	34	19	3	12	76	63	+13	60	
7	Axiopolis Cernavodă	34	19	1	14	130	56	+74	58	
8	Sparta Techirghiol	34	16	4	14	93	67	+26	52	
9	Viitorul Hârșova	34	16	2	16	78	69	+9	50	
10	Victoria Cumpăna	34	13	8	13	71	69	+2	47	
11	Farul Tuzla	34	13	2	19	62	102	−40	41	
12	Portul Constanța	34	11	5	18	53	63	−10	38	
13	Viitorul Cobadin	34	11	4	19	53	94	−41	37	
14	Viitorul Pecineaga	34	9	2	23	72	120	−48	29	
15	Mihail Kogălniceanu	34	8	4	22	93	116	−23	28	
16	Știința ACALAB Poarta Albă (Note: Știința ACALAB Poarta Albă was spared from relegation due to the promotion of Gloria Băneasa to Liga III.)	34	8	4	22	58	116	−58	28	Spared from relegation
17	Voința Valu lui Traian (R)	34	4	3	27	33	135	−102	15	Relegation to Liga V Constanța
18	Emaus Cernavodă (R)	34	3	0	31	30	220	−190	9	Relegation to Liga V Constanța

Rules for classification: 1) Points; 2) Head-to-head points; 3) Head-to-head goal difference; 4) Head-to-head goals scored; 5) Head-to-head away goals scored; 6) Goal difference; 7) Goals scored.
(C) Champions; (Q) Qualified for the phase indicated; (R) Relegated

=== Covasna County ===
Liga IV Covasna was held with only nine teams in the first season after the COVID-19 pandemic — eight from the previous season and one newly admitted team. The competition was played in a single round-robin format.

Team changes from the 2019–20 season

- Sepsi Sfântu Gheorghe II enrolled in the 2020–21 Liga III upon request.
- Venus Ozun was admitted upon request.

Pos	Team	Pld	W	D	L	GF	GA	GD	Pts	Qualification or relegation
1	Baraolt (C, Q)	8	7	1	0	32	7	+25	22	Qualification to promotion play-off
2	Prima Brăduț	8	6	1	1	23	4	+19	19	
3	Progresul Sita Buzăului	8	5	0	3	18	12	+6	15	
4	Perkö Sânzieni	8	4	1	3	57	13	+44	13	
5	Covasna	8	4	0	4	17	12	+5	12	
6	Reci	8	3	0	5	20	20	0	9	
7	Cernat	8	2	2	4	13	16	−3	8	
8	Nemere Ghelința	8	2	1	5	11	27	−16	7	
9	Venus Ozun	8	0	0	8	5	85	−80	0	

Rules for classification: 1) Points; 2) Head-to-head points; 3) Head-to-head goal difference; 4) Head-to-head goals scored; 5) Head-to-head away goals scored; 6) Goal difference; 7) Goals scored.
(C) Champions; (Q) Qualified for the phase indicated

=== Dâmbovița County ===
Team changes from the 2019–20 season

- Luceafărul Dragomirești, Olimpicii Ulmi, Unirea Colibași and Gaz Metan Finta withdrew.
- Voința Crețu, Flacăra Șuța Seacă and ACS Burduca were admitted upon request.
- FC Brezoaele was renamed AFC 1948 Brezoaele.
- Sportul Voinești was renamed Viitorul Voinești.

Pos	Team	Pld	W	D	L	GF	GA	GD	Pts	Qualification or relegation
1	Roberto Ziduri (C, Q)	30	27	3	0	127	15	+112	84	Qualification to promotion play-off
2	Străjerii Târgoviște 1396	30	23	5	2	112	25	+87	74	
3	Recolta Gura Șuții	30	22	3	5	112	36	+76	69	
4	Viitorul Voinești	30	15	7	8	78	60	+18	52	
5	Voința Crețu	30	16	3	11	70	57	+13	51	
6	Unirea Ungureni	30	15	2	13	98	84	+14	47	
7	1948 Brezoaele	30	13	7	10	66	57	+9	46	
8	Urban Titu	30	12	6	12	65	55	+10	42	
9	Fieni	30	11	6	13	75	89	−14	39	
10	Unirea Bucșani	30	9	7	14	69	82	−13	34	
11	Steagu Roșu Colacu	30	10	2	18	73	99	−26	32	
12	Flacăra Șuța Seacă	30	8	4	18	43	96	−53	28	
13	Burduca	30	8	3	19	48	114	−66	27	
14	Voința Vișina	30	7	3	20	38	93	−55	24	
15	Viitorul Răzvad (R)	30	8	4	18	42	73	−31	22 (Note: Viitorul Răzvad deducted 6 points.)	Relegation to Liga V Dâmbovița
16	Progresul Mătăsaru (Note: Progresul Mătăsaru excluded in the second part of the season and lost all matches with 0–3.) (R)	30	2	3	25	26	107	−81	9	Relegation to Liga V Dâmbovița
17	Gloria Cornești (Note: Gloria Cornești withdrew after 16 rounds and all its results were canceled.) (D)	0	0	0	0	0	0	0	0	Withdrew

Rules for classification: 1) Points; 2) Head-to-head points; 3) Head-to-head goal difference; 4) Head-to-head goals scored; 5) Head-to-head away goals scored; 6) Goal difference; 7) Goals scored.
(C) Champions; (D) Disqualified; (Q) Qualified for the phase indicated; (R) Relegated

=== Dolj County ===
Team changes from the 2019–20 season

- Tractorul Cetate II, Tineretul Poiana Mare and Recolta Ostroveni withdrew.
- Avântul Pielești, ACS Galicea Mare, Progresul Băilești, ACS Mârșani, Dunărea Cetate and CSO Filiași II were admitted upon request.

Pos	Team	Pld	W	D	L	GF	GA	GD	Pts	Qualification or relegation
1	Dunărea Calafat (C, Q)	32	25	3	4	105	29	+76	78	Qualification to promotion play-off
2	Jiul Podari	32	21	5	6	93	33	+60	68	
3	Cârcea	32	19	7	6	91	51	+40	64	
4	Metropolitan Ișalnița	32	18	8	6	64	31	+33	62	
5	Știința Danubius Bechet	32	19	4	9	98	47	+51	61	
6	Unirea Tricolor Dăbuleni	32	18	3	11	92	61	+31	57	
7	Avântul Pielești	32	16	5	11	77	62	+15	53	
8	Unirea Amărăștii de Jos	32	16	5	11	67	56	+11	53	
9	Progresul Cerăt	32	16	3	13	76	80	−4	51	
10	Galicea Mare	32	12	7	13	51	59	−8	43	
11	Progresul Băilești	32	12	3	17	48	62	−14	39	
12	Viitorul Măceșu de Sus	32	10	7	15	60	71	−11	37	
13	Dunărea Cetate (Note: Filiași II and Dunărea Cetate withdrew and lost all matches from the second part of the season with 0–3.)	32	9	4	19	32	68	−36	31 (Note: The Filiași II – Dunărea Cetate match from Round 34 was awarded as a double forfeit, with both teams losing the game by forfeit after they had withdrawn from the competition.)	
14	Mârșani	32	7	4	21	44	96	−52	25	
15	Filiași II	32	7	3	22	40	78	−38	24	
16	Flacăra Moțăței	32	5	3	24	37	127	−90	18	
17	Progresul Segarcea	32	4	0	28	40	110	−70	12	
18	AVictoria Plenița (Note: Victoria Plenița withdrew in the first part of the season and all its results were canceled.) (D)	0	0	0	0	0	0	0	0	Withdrew

Rules for classification: 1) Points; 2) Head-to-head points; 3) Head-to-head goal difference; 4) Head-to-head goals scored; 5) Head-to-head away goals scored; 6) Goal difference; 7) Goals scored.
(C) Champions; (D) Disqualified; (Q) Qualified for the phase indicated

=== Galați County ===
Team changes from the 2019–20 season

- Avântul Valea Mărului achieved promotion to 2020–21 Liga III.
- Avântul Valea Mărului withdraw at the end of the 2020–21 Liga III season and enrolled to Liga IV Galați after was renamed Răzeșii Valea Mărului.
- Zimbrul Slobozia Conachi, Victoria Tecuci, Viitorul Costache Negri and Juventus Toflea withdrew.
- Covurluiul 2021 Târgu Bujor and Viitorul Umbrărești were admitted upon request.

Pos	Team	Pld	W	D	L	GF	GA	GD	Pts	Qualification or relegation
1	Unirea Braniștea (C, Q)	22	22	0	0	151	8	+143	66	Qualification to promotion play-off
2	Voința Cudalbi	22	17	2	3	90	37	+53	53	
3	Gloria Ivești	22	16	1	5	74	24	+50	49	
4	Quantum Club Galați	22	12	2	8	60	47	+13	38	
5	Muncitorul Ghidigeni	22	10	4	8	74	47	+27	34	
6	Covurluiul 2021 Târgu Bujor	22	9	6	7	46	42	+4	33	
7	Viitorul Umbrărești	22	9	2	11	61	61	0	29	
8	Victoria Independența	22	9	0	13	49	46	+3	27	
9	Avântul Drăgănești	22	6	2	14	34	90	−56	20	
10	Avântul Vânători	22	4	5	13	30	72	−42	17	
11	Agrostar Tulucești (R)	22	4	2	16	44	86	−42	14	Relegation to Liga V Galați
12	Răzeșii Valea Mărului (R)	22	0	2	20	13	166	−153	2	Relegation to Liga V Galați

Rules for classification: 1) Points; 2) Head-to-head points; 3) Head-to-head goal difference; 4) Head-to-head goals scored; 5) Head-to-head away goals scored; 6) Goal difference; 7) Goals scored.
(C) Champions; (Q) Qualified for the phase indicated; (R) Relegated

=== Giurgiu County ===
The Liga IV Giurgiu was played in two stages, with a regular season split into two series of fourteen teams each, followed by a championship play-off featuring the top two teams from each series, consisting of semi-finals and a final.

Team changes from the 2019–20 season

- AS Prundu, Progresul Valea Dragului, Rapid Clejani and Unirea Cosoba withdrew.

South Series

Pos	Team	Pld	W	D	L	GF	GA	GD	Pts	Qualification or relegation
1	Dunărea Giurgiu	24	20	3	1	98	7	+91	63	Qualification to championship play-off
2	Victoria Adunații-Copăceni	24	18	3	3	105	26	+79	57	Qualification to championship play-off
3	Giganții Vărăști	24	18	3	3	94	28	+66	57	
4	Energia Remuș	24	16	4	4	80	26	+54	52	
5	Voința Slobozia	24	10	2	12	65	81	−16	32	
6	Mihai Viteazul Călugăreni	24	8	5	11	33	54	−21	29	
7	Real Colibași	24	8	5	11	42	84	−42	29	
8	Gloria Comana	24	9	2	13	54	76	−22	27 (Note: Gloria Comana deducted 2 points.)	
9	Dunărea Oinacu	24	7	4	13	34	58	−24	25	
10	Viitorul Vedea	24	7	1	16	45	87	−42	22	
11	Voința Daia (Note: Argeșul Hotarele and Voința Daia withdrew in the second part of the season and lost all remaining matches with 0–3.) (R)	23	7	0	16	35	59	−24	21	Relegation to Liga V Giurgiu
12	Argeșul Hotarele (R)	23	5	1	17	36	77	−41	16	Relegation to Liga V Giurgiu
13	Unirea Izvoarele	24	4	3	17	27	85	−58	15	
14	Spicul Izvoru (Note: Spicul Izvoru withdrew from the championship just before it started.) (D)	0	0	0	0	0	0	0	0	Withdrew

Rules for classification: 1) Points; 2) Head-to-head points; 3) Head-to-head goal difference; 4) Head-to-head goals scored; 5) Head-to-head away goals scored; 6) Goal difference; 7) Goals scored.
(D) Disqualified; (R) Relegated
Notes:

North Series

Pos	Team	Pld	W	D	L	GF	GA	GD	Pts	Qualification or relegation
1	Singureni	26	24	1	1	98	16	+82	73	Qualification to championship play-off
2	Bolintin Malu Spart	26	22	1	3	104	31	+73	67	Qualification to championship play-off
3	Viitorul Tântava	26	15	5	6	102	32	+70	48 (Note: Viitorul Tântava deducted 2 points.)	
4	Avântul Florești	26	14	4	8	59	45	+14	46	
5	Petrolul Roata de Jos	26	12	7	7	57	57	0	43	
6	Silver Inter Zorile	26	10	5	11	63	51	+12	35	
7	Maxima Hobaia	26	9	6	11	55	67	−12	33	
8	Luceafărul Trestieni	26	10	2	14	48	65	−17	32	
9	Argeșul Mihăilești (Note: Argeșul Mihăilești withdrew in the second part of the season and lost all remaining matches with 0–3.) (R)	26	9	1	16	49	48	+1	28	Relegation to Liga V Giurgiu
10	Real Drăgăneasca	26	8	3	15	43	63	−20	27	
11	Zmeii Ogrezeni	26	7	4	15	40	60	−20	25	
12	Iepurești	26	7	3	16	42	110	−68	24	
13	Bolintin-Deal	26	6	2	18	43	97	−54	20	
14	Podu Doamnei (R)	26	6	2	18	34	95	−61	20	Relegation to Liga V Giurgiu

Rules for classification: 1) Points; 2) Head-to-head points; 3) Head-to-head goal difference; 4) Head-to-head goals scored; 5) Head-to-head away goals scored; 6) Goal difference; 7) Goals scored.
(R) Relegated
Notes:

Championship play-off

All matches were played at Marin Anastasovici Stadium in Giurgiu on 7 and 8 June 2022 the semi-finals and on 11 June 2022 the final.

Semi-finals

Team 1	Score	Team 2
Singureni	2–2 (7–8 p)	Victoria Adunații-Copăceni
Dunărea Giurgiu	2–1	Bolintin Malu Spart

Final

Team 1	Score	Team 2
Dunărea Giurgiu	1–1 (15–16 p)	Victoria Adunații-Copăceni

Victoria Adunații-Copăceni won the Liga IV Giurgiu County and qualified for the promotion play-off in Liga III.

=== Gorj County ===
The Liga IV Gorj was held with ten teams in the first season after the COVID-19 pandemic — eight from the previous season and two newly admitted teams. It was played in a double round-robin format, followed by a play-off between the top four teams of the regular season, also played home and away, with the points accumulated during the regular season carried over.

Team changes from the 2019–20 season

- Vulturii Fărcașești, Avântul Baia de Fier, CS Novaci, Parângul Bumbești-Jiu, Dinamo Inter Stănești Știința Flacăra Roșia de Amaradia Toflea withdrew.
- Unirea Țânțăreni and Minerul Motru were admitted upon request.
- Știința Turceni was renamed CSO Turceni.

Pos	Team	Pld	W	D	L	GF	GA	GD	Pts	Qualification or relegation
1	Turceni	18	14	2	2	38	12	+26	44	Qualification to championship play-off
2	Internațional Bălești	18	12	1	5	44	22	+22	37	Qualification to championship play-off
3	Petrolul Bustuchin	18	10	6	2	46	19	+27	36	Qualification to championship play-off
4	Jiul Rovinari	18	11	2	5	36	18	+18	35	Qualification to championship play-off
5	Petrolul Stoina	18	9	4	5	46	31	+15	31	
6	Petrolul Țicleni	18	8	5	5	33	21	+12	29	
7	Minerul II Mătăsari	18	4	4	10	18	37	−19	16	
8	Minerul Motru	18	2	4	12	16	45	−29	10	
9	Viitorul Negomir	18	3	1	14	13	49	−36	10	
10	Unirea Țânțăreni	18	1	3	14	15	51	−36	6	

Rules for classification: 1) Points; 2) Head-to-head points; 3) Head-to-head goal difference; 4) Head-to-head goals scored; 5) Head-to-head away goals scored; 6) Goal difference; 7) Goals scored.

Championship play-off

Pos	Team	Pld	W	D	L	GF	GA	GD	Pts	Qualification
1	Turceni (C, Q)	24	17	2	5	54	22	+32	53	Qualification to promotion play-off
2	Petrolul Bustuchin	24	14	7	3	64	30	+34	49	
3	Jiul Rovinari	24	13	4	7	48	30	+18	43	
4	Internațional Bălești	24	13	2	9	50	41	+9	41	

Rules for classification: 1) Points; 2) Head-to-head points; 3) Head-to-head goal difference; 4) Head-to-head goals scored; 5) Head-to-head away goals scored; 6) Goal difference; 7) Goals scored.
(C) Champions; (Q) Qualified for the phase indicated

=== Harghita County ===
The Liga IV Harghita County featured twelve teams in the first season after the COVID-19 pandemic, eleven from the previous season and one newly admitted, and was played in a double round-robin format.

Team changes from the 2019–20 season

- Golimpiakosz Odorheiu Secuiesc was admitted upon request.
- Sporting Odorheiu Secuiesc, Unirea Lueta, Galambfalva Porumbenii Mari, Metalul Vlăhița and Pro Mureșul Toplița withdrew.
- AS Forțeni, Tineretul Morăreni, Andycom Avrămești, FC Sânsimion, ACS Sândominic, Fișag Ciucsângeorgiu, MÜ Frumoasa and Ghimeș-Făget Lunca de Jos were entered in Liga V Harghita.

Pos	Team	Pld	W	D	L	GF	GA	GD	Pts	Qualification or relegation
1	Gheorgheni (C, Q)	22	20	1	1	128	20	+108	61	Qualification to promotion play-off
2	Roseal Odorheiu Secuiesc	22	14	4	4	77	37	+40	46	
3	Agyagfalvi Lendület Lutița	22	13	3	6	62	28	+34	42	
4	Unirea Cristuru Secuiesc	22	13	1	8	64	43	+21	40	
5	Minerul Bălan	22	12	2	8	65	44	+21	38	
6	Golimpiakosz Odorheiu Secuiesc	22	11	4	7	67	48	+19	37	
7	Bradul Zetea	22	8	5	9	56	75	−19	29	
8	Ezüstfenyő Ciceu	22	8	4	10	49	61	−12	28	
9	Bastya Lăzarea	22	5	3	14	36	83	−47	18	
10	Homorod Merești	22	5	2	15	36	87	−51	17	
11	Farkaslaka Lupeni (R)	22	3	3	16	36	83	−47	12	Relegation to Liga V Harghita
12	Reménység Mărtiniș (R)	22	3	2	17	34	101	−67	11	Relegation to Liga V Harghita

Rules for classification: 1) Points; 2) Head-to-head points; 3) Head-to-head goal difference; 4) Head-to-head goals scored; 5) Head-to-head away goals scored; 6) Goal difference; 7) Goals scored.
(C) Champions; (Q) Qualified for the phase indicated; (R) Relegated

=== Hunedoara County ===
The Liga IV Hunedoara County was played in a double round-robin regular season with ten teams, followed by a Final Four and 5–7 and 8–10 place play-offs, all three contested in a double round-robin format, with teams starting with half of their regular season points, rounded up, and no other records carried over.

Team changes from the previous season

- Aurul Brad achieved promotion to Liga III.
- CS Hunedoara II was admitted upon request.

Pos	Team	Pld	W	D	L	GF	GA	GD	Pts	Qualification
1	Retezatul Hațeg	18	12	5	1	59	10	+49	41	Qualification to final four
2	Mihai Viteazu Vulcan	18	11	5	2	62	22	+40	38	Qualification to final four
3	Gloria Geoagiu	18	11	3	4	63	21	+42	36	Qualification to final four
4	Inter Petrila	18	11	3	4	46	24	+22	36	Qualification to final four
5	Șoimul Băița	18	11	2	5	63	39	+24	35	Qualification to 5–7 place play-off
6	Victoria Călan	18	7	0	11	20	62	−42	21	Qualification to 5–7 place play-off
7	Hunedoara II	18	6	1	11	32	41	−9	19	Qualification to 5–7 place play-off
8	Dacia Orăștie	18	5	2	11	28	43	−15	17	Qualification to 8–10 place play-off
9	Deva II	18	4	1	13	22	60	−38	13	Qualification to 8–10 place play-off
10	Minerul Uricani	18	1	0	17	7	80	−73	3	Qualification to 8–10 place play-off

Rules for classification: 1) Points; 2) Head-to-head points; 3) Head-to-head goal difference; 4) Head-to-head goals scored; 5) Head-to-head away goals scored; 6) Goal difference; 7) Goals scored.

Championship play-off
Final four

Pos	Team	Pld	W	D	L	GF	GA	GD	Pts	Qualification
1	Retezatul Hațeg (C, Q)	6	5	1	0	17	5	+12	37	Qualification to promotion play-off
2	Mihai Viteazu Vulcan	6	2	1	3	8	12	−4	26	
3	Inter Petrila	6	2	0	4	9	13	−4	24	
4	Gloria Geoagiu	6	1	2	3	8	12	−4	23	

Rules for classification: 1) Points; 2) Head-to-head points; 3) Head-to-head goal difference; 4) Head-to-head goals scored; 5) Head-to-head away goals scored; 6) Goal difference; 7) Goals scored.
(C) Champions; (Q) Qualified for the phase indicated

5–7 place play-off

Pos	Team	Pld	W	D	L	GF	GA	GD	Pts
5	Șoimul Băița	4	4	0	0	19	5	+14	30
6	Hunedoara II	4	1	1	2	5	9	−4	14
7	Victoria Călan	4	0	1	3	8	18	−10	12

Rules for classification: 1) Points; 2) Head-to-head points; 3) Head-to-head goal difference; 4) Head-to-head goals scored; 5) Head-to-head away goals scored; 6) Goal difference; 7) Goals scored.

8–10 place play-off

Pos	Team	Pld	W	D	L	GF	GA	GD	Pts
8	Dacia Orăștie	4	2	1	1	12	10	+2	16
9	Deva II	4	2	2	0	12	6	+6	15
10	Minerul Uricani	4	0	1	3	5	13	−8	3

Rules for classification: 1) Points; 2) Head-to-head points; 3) Head-to-head goal difference; 4) Head-to-head goals scored; 5) Head-to-head away goals scored; 6) Goal difference; 7) Goals scored.

=== Ialomița County ===
Team changes from the 2019–20 season

- CSM Fetești achieved promotion to 2021–22 Liga III following the 2020–21 short tournament.
- Unirea Scânteia (Series I winners) and Progresul Sfântu Gheorghe (Series II winners) were promoted from Liga V Ialomița.
- FC Orezu and Unirea Grivița withdrew.
- Victoria Roșiori was admitted upon request.
- Avântul Rovine was renamed FC 2018 Rovine.

Pos	Team	Pld	W	D	L	GF	GA	GD	Pts	Qualification or relegation
1	Amara (C, Q)	28	21	6	1	86	26	+60	69	Qualification to promotion play-off
2	Bărăganul Ciulnița	28	19	4	5	100	32	+68	61	
3	Unirea Ion Roată	28	16	9	3	70	35	+35	57	
4	Rovine	28	17	4	7	94	38	+56	55	
5	Victoria Țăndărei	28	15	2	11	70	47	+23	47	
6	Înfrățirea Jilavele	28	11	6	11	65	66	−1	39	
7	Abatorul Slobozia	28	12	2	14	77	84	−7	38	
8	Victoria Munteni-Buzău	28	12	2	14	59	66	−7	38	
9	Iazu	28	11	2	15	77	83	−6	35	
10	Viitorul Axintele	28	10	5	13	50	67	−17	35	
11	Urziceni	28	9	7	12	40	50	−10	34	
12	Unirea Scânteia	28	9	5	14	55	69	−14	32	
13	Victoria Roșiori	28	9	5	14	73	115	−42	32	
14	Recolta Bărcănești	28	5	4	19	52	101	−49	19	
15	Recolta Gheorghe Lazăr (Note: Recolta Gheorghe Lazăr was spared from relegation due to the promotion of Amara in Liga III.)	28	1	3	24	26	115	−89	6	Spared from relegation
16	Progresul Sfântu Gheorghe (Note: Progresul Sfântu Gheorghe withdrew from the championship after 2 rounds and all its results were canceled.) (D)	0	0	0	0	0	0	0	0	Withdrew

Rules for classification: 1) Points; 2) Head-to-head points; 3) Head-to-head goal difference; 4) Head-to-head goals scored; 5) Head-to-head away goals scored; 6) Goal difference; 7) Goals scored.
(C) Champions; (D) Disqualified; (Q) Qualified for the phase indicated

=== Iași County ===
Team changes from the 2019–20 season

- CS Ciurea, Unirea Mircești and Viitorul Târgu Frumos withdrew.

Pos	Team	Pld	W	D	L	GF	GA	GD	Pts	Qualification or relegation
1	Flacăra Erbiceni (C, Q)	24	20	4	0	103	25	+78	64	Qualification to promotion play-off
2	Victoria Lețcani	24	18	3	3	69	22	+47	57	
3	Moldova Cristești	24	16	4	4	65	18	+47	52	
4	Stejarul Bârnova	24	15	3	6	82	43	+39	48	
5	Gloria Bălțați	24	14	4	6	69	36	+33	46	
6	Unirea Ruginoasa	24	12	1	11	60	53	+7	37	
7	Viitorul Hârlau	24	12	0	12	53	55	−2	36	
8	Țuțora	24	9	3	12	55	74	−19	30	
9	Stejarul Sinești	24	6	6	12	36	48	−12	24	
10	Unirea Scânteia	24	6	4	14	50	60	−10	22	
11	Tomești	24	7	0	17	46	84	−38	21	
12	Biruința Miroslovești	24	3	0	21	16	75	−59	9 (Note: Biruința Miroslovești withdrew after 12 rounds and lost all remaining matches with 0–3.)	
13	Progresul Deleni	24	1	2	21	20	131	−111	5	

Rules for classification: 1) Points; 2) Head-to-head points; 3) Head-to-head goal difference; 4) Head-to-head goals scored; 5) Head-to-head away goals scored; 6) Goal difference; 7) Goals scored.
(C) Champions; (Q) Qualified for the phase indicated

=== Ilfov County ===
The Liga IV Ilfov County was played over two series in a double round-robin format, with the top two teams from each series qualifying for the championship play-off, which was contested over two legs in both the semi-finals and the final.

Team changes from the 2019–20 season

- Viitorul Domnești and Voluntari III withdrew.
- Voința 2018 Crevedia, Star Team Buftea, ARD Snagov, Speranța Săbăreni, Voința Domnești, Viitorul Petrăchioaia, CSO Bragadiru, Juniors Berceni, CSL Ștefănești and ACS Dărvari were admitted upon request.

Series I

Pos	Team	Pld	W	D	L	GF	GA	GD	Pts	Qualification or relegation
1	Voința 2018 Crevedia	18	16	1	1	74	16	+58	49	Ineligible for promotion
2	Viitorul Dragomirești-Vale (Q)	18	13	3	2	47	17	+30	42	Qualification to championship play-off
3	Voința Domnești	18	11	3	4	54	25	+29	36	Ineligible for promotion
4	ARD Snagov	18	10	2	6	33	22	+11	32	Ineligible for promotion
5	Speranța Săbăreni	18	9	2	7	36	40	−4	29	Ineligible for promotion
6	Ciorogârla (Q)	18	8	2	8	54	38	+16	26	Qualification to championship play-off
7	Voința Buftea	18	7	3	8	39	35	+4	24	
8	Periș	18	3	1	14	20	65	−45	10	
9	Star Team Buftea (R)	18	3	1	14	20	66	−46	10	Relegation to Liga V Ilfov
10	Corbeanca (R)	18	1	0	17	22	75	−53	3	Relegation to Liga V Ilfov

Rules for classification: 1) Points; 2) Head-to-head points; 3) Head-to-head goal difference; 4) Head-to-head goals scored; 5) Head-to-head away goals scored; 6) Goal difference; 7) Goals scored.
(Q) Qualified for the phase indicated; (R) Relegated

Series II

Pos	Team	Pld	W	D	L	GF	GA	GD	Pts	Qualification or relegation
1	Ștefănești	18	14	2	2	64	23	+41	44	Ineligible for promotion
2	Glina (Q)	18	11	3	4	66	40	+26	36	Qualification to championship play-off
3	Bragadiru	18	11	3	4	44	21	+23	36	Ineligible for promotion
4	Juniors Berceni	18	9	3	6	40	28	+12	30	Ineligible for promotion
5	Viitorul Pantelimon	18	8	2	8	44	44	0	26	Ineligible for promotion
6	Brănești (Q)	18	8	2	8	42	42	0	26	Qualification to championship play-off
7	Măgurele	18	5	3	10	41	63	−22	18	
8	Dărvari	18	5	2	11	28	44	−16	17	
9	Berceni (R)	18	4	2	12	26	61	−35	14	Relegation to Liga V Ilfov
10	Viitorul Petrăchioaia	18	4	0	14	29	58	−29	12	Spared from relegation

Rules for classification: 1) Points; 2) Head-to-head points; 3) Head-to-head goal difference; 4) Head-to-head goals scored; 5) Head-to-head away goals scored; 6) Goal difference; 7) Goals scored.
(Q) Qualified for the phase indicated; (R) Relegated

Championship play-off
Semi-finals

The matches were played on 28 May and 1 June 2022.

Team 1	Agg.	Team 2	1st leg	2nd leg
Glina	10–5	Ciorogârla	5–3	5–2
Viitorul Dragomirești-Vale	3–4	Brănești	3–1	0–3

Final

The matches were played on 8 and 11 June 2022.

Team 1	Agg.	Team 2	1st leg	2nd leg
Brănești	6–8	Glina	4–3	2–5

Glina won the Liga IV Ilfov County and qualified for the promotion play-off in Liga III.

=== Maramureș County ===
Team changes from the 2019–20 season

- Progresul Șomcuta Mare achieved promotion to 2020–21 Liga III.
- Progresul Dumbrăvița, AS Nistru and Foresta Câmpulung la Tisa withdrew.
- Gloria Tăuții-Măgherăuș and ASCF Lăpuș R were admitted upon request.

South Series

Pos	Team	Pld	W	D	L	GF	GA	GD	Pts	Qualification or relegation
1	Lăpușul Târgu Lăpuș (Q)	22	18	1	3	77	15	+62	55	Qualification to final four
2	Suciu de Sus (Q)	22	18	0	4	77	28	+49	54	Qualification to final four
3	Unirea Șișești	22	16	3	3	100	30	+70	51	
4	Minerul Baia Sprie	22	15	4	3	82	28	+54	49	
5	Gloria Tăuții-Măgherăuș	22	12	3	7	64	47	+17	39	
6	Fărcașa	22	10	4	8	63	47	+16	34	
7	Lăpuș R	22	8	2	12	52	59	−7	26	
8	Rapid Satu Nou de Sus	22	7	2	13	42	78	−36	23	
9	Seini	22	6	2	14	37	72	−35	20	
10	Bradul Groșii Țibleșului	22	4	3	15	32	83	−51	15	
11	Viitorul Ulmeni	22	4	0	18	32	97	−65	12	
12	Carmen Satulung	22	1	2	19	23	97	−74	5	

Rules for classification: 1) Points; 2) Head-to-head points; 3) Head-to-head goal difference; 4) Head-to-head goals scored; 5) Head-to-head away goals scored; 6) Goal difference; 7) Goals scored.
(Q) Qualified for the phase indicated

North Series

Pos	Team	Pld	W	D	L	GF	GA	GD	Pts	Qualification or relegation
1	Sighetu Marmației (Q)	18	17	0	1	83	7	+76	51	Qualification to final four
2	Bradul Vișeu de Sus (Q)	18	13	2	3	59	14	+45	41	Qualification to final four
3	Recolta Săliștea de Sus	18	11	2	5	41	24	+17	35	
4	Avântul Bârsana	18	11	2	5	46	31	+15	35	
5	Salina Ocna Șugatag	18	11	2	5	50	39	+11	35	
6	Zorile Moisei	18	9	1	8	46	34	+12	28	
7	Iza Dragomirești	18	5	2	11	27	61	−34	17	
8	Remeți	18	3	0	15	26	61	−35	9	
9	Borșa	18	2	1	15	18	71	−53	7	
10	Metalul Bogdan Vodă	18	1	2	15	10	64	−54	5	

Rules for classification: 1) Points; 2) Head-to-head points; 3) Head-to-head goal difference; 4) Head-to-head goals scored; 5) Head-to-head away goals scored; 6) Goal difference; 7) Goals scored.
(Q) Qualified for the phase indicated

Final four
Semi-finals

The first legs were played on 28 and 29 May, and the second legs were played on 4 and 5 June 2022.

Team 1	Agg.	Team 2	1st leg	2nd leg
Suciu de Sus	0–10	Sighetu Marmației	0–2	0–8
Bradul Vișeu de Sus	2–8	Lăpușul Târgu Lăpuș	1–1	1–7

Final

The championship final was played on 11 June 2022 at Viorel Mateianu Stadium in Baia Mare.

Team 1	Score	Team 2
Sighetu Marmației	2–1	Lăpușul Târgu Lăpuș

Sighetu Marmației won the Liga IV Maramureș County and qualified for the promotion play-off in Liga III.

=== Mehedinți County ===
Team changes from the 2019–20 season

- Viitorul Șimian achieved promotion to 2021–22 Liga III following the 2020–21 short tournament.
- CS Strehaia, Dierna Orșova, Unirea Gârla Mare and Cerna Baia de Aramă withdrew.
- Viitorul Severin, Viitorul Corcova and AS Noapteșa were admitted upon request.

Pos	Team	Pld	W	D	L	GF	GA	GD	Pts	Qualification or relegation
1	Recolta Dănceu (C, Q)	22	20	2	0	105	16	+89	62	Qualification to promotion play-off
2	Pandurii Cerneți	22	17	1	4	70	26	+44	52	
3	Turnu Severin	22	16	2	4	50	25	+25	50	
4	Obârșia de Câmp	22	13	4	5	48	22	+26	43	
5	Viitorul Cujmir	22	12	1	9	60	39	+21	37	
6	Viitorul Severin	22	8	3	11	42	42	0	27	
7	Victoria Vânju Mare	22	8	3	11	31	47	−16	27	
8	Viitorul Corcova	22	6	5	11	42	70	−28	23	
9	Noapteșa	22	6	3	13	29	53	−24	21	
10	Inter Salcia	22	5	0	17	29	67	−38	15	
11	Inter Crăguiești	22	5	0	17	29	83	−54	15	
12	Real Vânători	22	4	0	18	28	73	−45	12	

Rules for classification: 1) Points; 2) Head-to-head points; 3) Head-to-head goal difference; 4) Head-to-head goals scored; 5) Head-to-head away goals scored; 6) Goal difference; 7) Goals scored.
(C) Champions; (Q) Qualified for the phase indicated

=== Mureș County ===
Team changes from the 2019–20 season

- Unirea Ungheni achieved promotion to 2020–21 Liga III.
- CSM Sighișoara, Sâncrai Nazna, ACS Sărmașu Mare, Viitorul Ungheni and Mureșul Cuci withdrew.
- MSE 1898 Târgu Mureș, ASA Târgu Mureș, Kinder Sângeorgiu de Mureș, AS Câmpia Râciu, Academica Transilvania Târgu Mureș, Unirea Ungheni II, Înfrățirea Valea Izvoarelor and Viitorul Târnăveni were admitted upon request.

Series I

Pos	Team	Pld	W	D	L	GF	GA	GD	Pts	Qualification or relegation
1	MSE 1898 Târgu Mureș	16	15	1	0	104	8	+96	46	Qualification to championship play-off
2	ASA Târgu Mureș	16	13	1	2	50	10	+40	40	Qualification to championship play-off
3	Kinder Sângeorgiu de Mureș	16	9	0	7	41	35	+6	27	Qualification to championship play-off
4	Rază de Soare Acățari	16	4	6	6	19	30	−11	18	Qualification to championship play-off
5	Mureșul Rușii-Munți	16	5	3	8	28	47	−19	18	Qualification to championship play-out
6	Sovata	16	4	4	8	27	48	−21	16	Qualification to championship play-out
7	Târnava Mică Sângeorgiu de Pădure	16	4	2	10	12	49	−37	14	Qualification to championship play-out
8	Miercurea Nirajului	16	2	6	8	16	54	−38	12	Qualification to championship play-out
9	Câmpia Râciu	16	3	3	10	26	42	−16	12	Qualification to championship play-out

Rules for classification: 1) Points; 2) Head-to-head points; 3) Head-to-head goal difference; 4) Head-to-head goals scored; 5) Head-to-head away goals scored; 6) Goal difference; 7) Goals scored.

Series II

Pos	Team	Pld	W	D	L	GF	GA	GD	Pts	Qualification or relegation
1	Mureșul Luduș	16	14	1	1	55	12	+43	43	Qualification to championship play-off
2	Iernut	16	12	2	2	53	13	+40	38	Qualification to championship play-off
3	Academica Transilvania Târgu Mureș	16	10	2	4	40	28	+12	32	Qualification to championship play-off
4	Mureșul Chirileu	16	9	1	6	50	31	+19	28	Qualification to championship play-off
5	Atletic Târgu Mureș	16	6	3	7	36	49	−13	21	Qualification to championship play-out
6	Unirea Ungheni II	16	5	4	7	47	35	+12	19	Qualification to championship play-out
7	Inter Sânger	16	4	1	11	31	47	−16	13	Qualification to championship play-out
8	Înfrățirea Valea Izvoarelor	16	2	4	10	26	49	−23	10	Qualification to championship play-out
9	Viitorul Târnăveni	16	0	2	14	18	92	−74	2	Qualification to championship play-out

Rules for classification: 1) Points; 2) Head-to-head points; 3) Head-to-head goal difference; 4) Head-to-head goals scored; 5) Head-to-head away goals scored; 6) Goal difference; 7) Goals scored.

Championship play-off

In the championship play-off each team plays every other team once. Depending on the place occupied in the regular season, the teams started the play-off with the following points: 1st place – 3 points, 2nd place – 2 points, 3rd place – 1 point, 4th place – 0 points.

Pos	Team	Pld	W	D	L	GF	GA	GD	Pts	Qualification
1	MSE 1898 Târgu Mureș (C, Q)	7	7	0	0	34	2	+32	24	Qualification to promotion play-off
2	Academica Transilvania Târgu Mureș	7	5	1	1	24	9	+15	17	
3	ASA Târgu Mureș	7	5	0	2	16	13	+3	17	
4	Iernut	7	3	2	2	21	14	+7	13	
5	Mureșul Luduș	7	3	1	3	23	18	+5	13	
6	Kinder Sângeorgiu de Mureș	7	1	1	5	8	23	−15	5	
7	Mureșul Chirileu	7	1	1	5	10	25	−15	4	
8	Rază de Soare Acățari	7	0	0	7	2	34	−32	0	

Rules for classification: 1) Points; 2) Head-to-head points; 3) Head-to-head goal difference; 4) Head-to-head goals scored; 5) Head-to-head away goals scored; 6) Goal difference; 7) Goals scored.
(C) Champions; (Q) Qualified for the phase indicated

Championship play-out

In the championship play-out each team plays every other team once. Depending on the place occupied in the regular season, the teams started the play-out with the following points: 5th place – 4 points, 6th place – 3 points, 7th place – 2 points, 8th place – 1 point, 9th place – 0 points.

Pos	Team	Pld	W	D	L	GF	GA	GD	Pts	Relegation
9	Mureșul Rușii-Munți	8	6	1	1	22	11	+11	23	
10	Înfrățirea Valea Izvoarelor	8	6	1	1	38	14	+24	20	
11	Miercurea Nirajului	8	5	1	2	24	11	+13	17	
12	Sovata	8	3	1	4	20	18	+2	13	
13	Atletic Târgu Mureș	8	3	0	5	17	23	−6	13	
14	Inter Sânger	8	3	1	4	18	16	+2	12	
15	Târnava Mică Sângeorgiu de Pădure	8	3	0	5	8	15	−7	11	
16	Câmpia Râciu	8	3	1	4	13	17	−4	10	
17	Viitorul Târnăveni	8	1	0	7	6	41	−35	3	
18	Unirea Ungheni II (Note: Unirea Ungheni II withdrew from championship play-out.) (D)	0	0	0	0	0	0	0	3	Withdrew

Rules for classification: 1) Points; 2) Head-to-head points; 3) Head-to-head goal difference; 4) Head-to-head goals scored; 5) Head-to-head away goals scored; 6) Goal difference; 7) Goals scored.
(D) Disqualified

=== Neamț County ===
Team changes from the 2019–20 season

- Bradu Borca achieved promotion to 2020–21 Liga III.
- Bravo Bodești, Stejarul Țibucani, Zorile Urecheni, Flacăra Brusturi, AS Grumăzești, Voința Dochia, Moldova Cordun, Voința Valea Ursului, Voința Bozieni, Cetatea Gâdinți, Stejarul Stănița, WST Oniceni, Siretul Doljești and Moldova Pildești withdrew.
- CSM Roman was admitted upon request.

Pos	Team	Pld	W	D	L	GF	GA	GD	Pts	Qualification or relegation
1	Speranța Răucești (C, Q)	18	17	0	1	85	13	+72	51	Qualification to promotion play-off
2	Victoria Horia	18	14	1	3	59	19	+40	43	
3	Voința Ion Creangă	18	12	2	4	59	25	+34	38	
4	Viitorul Podoleni	18	9	2	7	46	33	+13	29	
5	Unirea Trifești	18	9	1	8	45	38	+7	28	
6	Ozana Timișești	18	9	1	8	50	48	+2	28	
7	Vulturul Costișa	18	5	2	11	28	60	−32	17	
8	Roman	18	5	0	13	33	66	−33	15	
9	Girov	18	3	3	12	29	60	−31	12	
10	Energia Pângărați	18	1	0	17	10	82	−72	3	

Rules for classification: 1) Points; 2) Head-to-head points; 3) Head-to-head goal difference; 4) Head-to-head goals scored; 5) Head-to-head away goals scored; 6) Goal difference; 7) Goals scored.
(C) Champions; (Q) Qualified for the phase indicated

=== Olt County ===
Team changes from the 2019–20 season

- Petrolul Potcoava achieved promotion to 2020–21 Liga III.
- Recolta Stoicănești, Valea Oltului Cilieni, Știința Cioflanu and Viitorul Băleasa withdrew.
- ACS Caracal, Știința Mărunței, Victoria Dăneasa and Viitorul Coteana were admitted upon request.

Pos	Team	Pld	W	D	L	GF	GA	GD	Pts	Qualification or relegation
1	Oltul Curtișoara (C, Q)	24	19	4	1	87	17	+70	61	Qualification to promotion play-off
2	Caracal	24	16	4	4	56	18	+38	52	
3	Unirea Radomirești	24	15	4	5	69	37	+32	49	
4	Viitorul Coteana	24	13	8	3	65	33	+32	47	
5	Știința Mărunței	24	14	4	6	64	30	+34	46	
6	Oltul Slătioara	24	12	5	7	58	37	+21	41	
7	Viitorul Osica de Jos	24	9	6	9	51	43	+8	33	
8	Olt Scornicești	24	9	4	11	49	51	−2	31	
9	Viitorul Grădinile	24	7	4	13	54	75	−21	25	
10	Viitorul Rusănești	24	7	2	15	51	71	−20	23	
11	Voința Schitu	24	7	2	15	53	77	−24	23	
12	Oltețul Osica	24	2	4	18	31	77	−46	10	
13	Victoria Dăneasa (R)	24	0	1	23	31	153	−122	1	Relegation to Liga V Olt
14	Voința Băbiciu (D)	0	0	0	0	0	0	0	0 (Note: Voința Băbiciu withdrew from the championship after 2 rounds and all its results were canceled.)	Withdrew

Rules for classification: 1) Points; 2) Head-to-head points; 3) Head-to-head goal difference; 4) Head-to-head goals scored; 5) Head-to-head away goals scored; 6) Goal difference; 7) Goals scored.
(C) Champions; (D) Disqualified; (Q) Qualified for the phase indicated; (R) Relegated

=== Prahova County ===
Team changes from the 2019–20 season

- CSO Plopeni achieved promotion to 2020–21 Liga III.
- Atletic United 1906 Ploiești, Voința Vărbilău and CSC Berceni were admitted upon request.
- CS Brazi Negoiești was renamed CS Brazi.
- Avântul Măneciu was renamed CSC Măneciu.
- Petrolul Băicoi was renamed CSO Băicoi.
- Mănești 2013 Coada Izvorului was renamed CS Mănești 2013.

Pos	Team	Pld	W	D	L	GF	GA	GD	Pts	Qualification or relegation
1	Păulești (C, Q)	34	26	5	3	107	28	+79	83	Qualification to promotion play-off
2	Atletic United 1906 Ploiești	34	25	7	2	95	25	+70	82	
3	Cornu	34	25	6	3	79	25	+54	81	
4	Tricolorul Breaza	34	22	4	8	130	36	+94	70	
5	Bănești-Urleta	34	19	7	8	99	47	+52	64	
6	Petrolul 95 Ploiești	34	17	9	8	94	49	+45	60	
7	Mănești	34	17	6	11	97	67	+30	57	
8	Brebu	34	17	4	13	75	59	+16	55	
9	Teleajenul Vălenii de Munte	34	14	9	11	60	55	+5	51	
10	Petrolistul Boldești	34	13	7	14	70	61	+9	46	
11	Voința Vărbilău	34	11	11	12	48	60	−12	44	
12	Unirea Urlați	34	11	6	17	50	68	−18	39	
13	Berceni	34	9	6	19	61	94	−33	33	
14	Strejnic	34	8	8	18	42	78	−36	32	
15	Măneciu	34	7	4	23	35	110	−75	25	
16	Brazi	33	5	4	24	26	106	−80	19	
17	Băicoi (Note: Băicoi was spared from relegation due to the promotion of Păulești to Liga III.)	34	3	4	27	34	133	−99	13	Spared from relegation
18	Tinerețea Izvoarele (Note: Tinerețea Izvoarele withdrew from the championship after the 30th round and lost all matches from the second half with 0–3.) (R)	33	2	1	30	18	119	−101	7	Relegation to Liga V Prahova

Rules for classification: 1) Points; 2) Head-to-head points; 3) Head-to-head goal difference; 4) Head-to-head goals scored; 5) Head-to-head away goals scored; 6) Goal difference; 7) Goals scored.
(C) Champions; (Q) Qualified for the phase indicated; (R) Relegated

=== Satu Mare County ===
Team changes from the 2019–20 season

- CSM Satu Mare achieved promotion to Liga III.
- Speranța Halmeu, Dacia Medieșu Aurit, Voința Turț, Victoria Apa, Voința Lazuri, Sportul Botiz, AS Livada and Venus Dumbrava from Series A were relegated to Liga V Satu Mare.
- Crasna Moftinu Mic, Voința Doba, Someșul Oar, Cetate Ardud, Voința Babța and Viitorul Vetiș from Series B were relegated to Liga V Satu Mare.
- Viitorul Lucăceni, Schamagosch Ciumești, Frohlich Foieni, Real Andrid, Victoria Tiream, AS Ghenci and Unirea Pișcolt from Series C were relegated to Liga V Satu Mare.

Series A

Pos	Team	Pld	W	D	L	GF	GA	GD	Pts	Qualification
1	Energia Negrești-Oaș	14	11	2	1	49	18	+31	35	Qualification to championship play-off
2	Talna Orașu Nou	14	10	2	2	37	10	+27	32	Qualification to championship play-off
3	Olimpia MCMXXI Satu Mare	14	10	2	2	35	11	+24	32	Qualification to championship play-off
4	Recolta Dorolț	14	8	2	4	46	26	+20	26	Qualification to championship play-off
5	Unirea Păulești	14	5	0	9	35	51	−16	15	Qualification to relegation play-out
6	Știința Beltiug	14	4	0	10	20	47	−27	12	Qualification to relegation play-out
7	Turul Micula	14	2	0	12	16	49	−33	6	Qualification to relegation play-out
8	Luceafărul Decebal	14	2	0	12	25	51	−26	6	Qualification to relegation play-out

Rules for classification: 1) Points; 2) Head-to-head points; 3) Head-to-head goal difference; 4) Head-to-head goals scored; 5) Head-to-head away goals scored; 6) Goal difference; 7) Goals scored.

Series B

Pos	Team	Pld	W	D	L	GF	GA	GD	Pts	Qualification
1	Victoria Carei	14	12	2	0	75	7	+68	38	Qualification to championship play-off
2	Unirea Tășnad	14	11	1	2	54	13	+41	34	Qualification to championship play-off
3	Viitorul Vetiș	14	11	0	3	67	21	+46	33	Qualification to championship play-off
4	Căpleni	14	7	0	7	39	28	+11	21	Qualification to championship play-off
5	Stăruința Berveni	14	5	1	8	25	27	−2	16	Qualification to relegation play-out
6	Schwaben Kalmandi Cămin	14	4	2	8	30	41	−11	14	Qualification to relegation play-out
7	Fortuna Căpleni	14	3	0	11	19	67	−48	9	Qualification to relegation play-out
8	Recolta Sanislău	14	0	0	14	7	112	−105	0	Qualification to relegation play-out

Rules for classification: 1) Points; 2) Head-to-head points; 3) Head-to-head goal difference; 4) Head-to-head goals scored; 5) Head-to-head away goals scored; 6) Goal difference; 7) Goals scored.

Championship play-off

The championship play-off was played as a single round-robin tournament among the top four teams from each series of the regular season. Teams started the play-off with the following points: 1st place – 3 points, 2nd place – 2 points, 3rd place – 1 point, and 4th place – 0 points.

Pos	Team	Pld	W	D	L	GF	GA	GD	Pts	Qualification
1	Victoria Carei (C, Q)	7	5	2	0	30	8	+22	20	Qualification to promotion play-off
2	Energia Negrești-Oaș	7	5	2	0	20	6	+14	20	
3	Unirea Tășnad	7	3	1	3	11	17	−6	12	
4	Talna Orașu Nou	7	2	3	2	16	13	+3	11	
5	Recolta Dorolț	7	3	1	3	17	12	+5	10	
6	Olimpia MCMXXI Satu Mare	7	2	2	3	17	9	+8	9	
7	Viitorul Vetiș	7	2	1	4	16	15	+1	8	
8	Căpleni	7	0	0	7	4	51	−47	0	

Source: sofascore.ro
Rules for classification: 1) Points; 2) Head-to-head points; 3) Head-to-head goal difference; 4) Head-to-head goals scored; 5) Head-to-head away goals scored; 6) Goal difference; 7) Goals scored.
(C) Champions; (Q) Qualified for the phase indicated

Relegation play-out

The relegation play-out was played as a single round-robin tournament among the last four teams from each series of the regular season. Teams began the play-out with the following points: 5th place – 3 points, 6th place – 2 points, 7th place – 1 point, and 8th place – 0 points.

Pos	Team	Pld	W	D	L	GF	GA	GD	Pts	Relegation
9	Luceafărul Decebal	7	6	1	0	35	15	+20	19	
10	Schwaben Kalmandi Cămin	7	4	0	3	28	16	+12	14	
11	Turul Micula	7	4	0	3	16	18	−2	13	
12	Unirea Păulești	7	3	0	4	24	19	+5	12	
13	Știința Beltiug	7	3	0	4	28	20	+8	11	
14	Stăruința Berveni	7	4	2	1	23	9	+14	17	
15	Fortuna Căpleni (Note: Fortuna Căpleni was spared from relegation due to the promotion of Victoria Carei to Liga III.)	7	1	1	5	9	25	−16	5	Spared from relegation
16	Recolta Sanislău	7	1	0	6	5	46	−41	3	Relegation to Liga V Satu Mare

Source: sofascore.ro
Rules for classification: 1) Points; 2) Head-to-head points; 3) Head-to-head goal difference; 4) Head-to-head goals scored; 5) Head-to-head away goals scored; 6) Goal difference; 7) Goals scored.

=== Sălaj County ===
Team changes from the 2019–20 season

- Sportul Șimleu Silvaniei achieved promotion to 2020–21 Liga III.
- Dumbrava Gâlgău Almașului, Olimpic Bocșa and AS Ileanda withdrew.
- Juniorii Ip, Rapid Zimbor, Luceafărul Bălan, ACS Bănișor-Peceiu and Venus Giurtelec were admitted upon request.

Pos	Team	Pld	W	D	L	GF	GA	GD	Pts	Qualification or relegation (Note: After 20 matches, the best four teams qualify for the series championship play-off, which is played in a single round-robin format.)
1	Rapid Jibou (C, Q)	23	19	3	1	132	37	+95	60	Qualification to promotion play-off
2	Chieșd	23	16	4	3	86	34	+52	52	
3	Someșul Someș-Odorhei	23	11	8	4	77	45	+32	41	
4	Juniorii Ip	23	7	7	9	41	85	−44	28	
5	Rapid Zimbor	20	8	4	8	53	43	+10	28	
6	Luceafărul Bălan	20	7	5	8	31	49	−18	26	
7	Barcău Nușfalău	20	8	1	11	35	46	−11	25	
8	Cosniciu	20	6	6	8	29	38	−9	24	
9	Ardealul Crișeni	20	4	4	12	38	54	−16	16	
10	Bănișor-Peceiu	20	4	3	13	24	47	−23	15	
11	Venus Giurtelec	20	3	1	16	27	95	−68	10	
12	Silvania Cehu Silvaniei (D)	0	0	0	0	0	0	0	0 (Note: Silvania Cehu Silvaniei withdrew before the start of the season.)	Withdrew

Rules for classification: 1) Points; 2) Head-to-head points; 3) Head-to-head goal difference; 4) Head-to-head goals scored; 5) Head-to-head away goals scored; 6) Goal difference; 7) Goals scored.
(C) Champions; (D) Disqualified; (Q) Qualified for the phase indicated

=== Sibiu County ===
Team changes from the 2019–20 season

- Măgura Cisnădie achieved promotion to 2020–21 Liga III.
- Măgura Cisnădie withdrew from 2021–22 Liga III and joined Liga IV Sibiu.
- Viitorul Șelimbăr II, Spicul Șeica Mare, Progresul Terezian Sibiu, Fraternitas Tălmaciu and Athletic Șura Mare withdrew.
- FC Dumbrăveni and CSO Copșa Mică were admitted on request.
- Inter Sibiu, Quantum/Cuantic Arsenal Sibiu and Interstar Sibiu joined from 2020–21 short tournament.

Pos	Team	Pld	W	D	L	GF	GA	GD	Pts	Qualification
1	Inter Sibiu	16	16	0	0	105	2	+103	48	Qualification to championship play-off
2	Avrig	16	14	0	2	53	18	+35	42	Qualification to championship play-off
3	Păltiniș Rășinari	16	13	1	2	82	15	+67	40	Qualification to championship play-off
4	Sparta Mediaș	16	12	1	3	65	19	+46	37	Qualification to championship play-off
5	Unirea Miercurea Sibiului	16	11	2	3	52	25	+27	35	Qualification to championship play-off
6	Dumbrăveni	16	9	2	5	50	28	+22	29	Qualification to championship play-off
7	Quantum/Cuantic Arsenal Sibiu	16	8	2	6	31	26	+5	26	Qualification to championship play-out
8	Bradu	16	6	3	7	27	44	−17	21	Qualification to championship play-out
9	Leii Șura Mică	16	5	5	6	31	38	−7	20	Qualification to championship play-out
10	Copșa Mică	16	6	0	10	47	72	−25	18	Qualification to championship play-out
11	Voința Sibiu	16	6	3	7	16	30	−14	15 (Note: Voința Sibiu were deducted 6 points.)	Qualification to championship play-out
12	Interstar Sibiu	16	3	4	9	21	48	−27	13	Qualification to championship play-out
13	Tălmaciu	16	4	1	11	30	42	−12	13	Qualification to championship play-out
14	Măgura Cisnădie	16	3	3	10	20	45	−25	12	Qualification to championship play-out
15	Vulturul Poplaca	16	2	1	13	19	81	−62	7	Qualification to championship play-out
16	ASA Sibiu	16	0	2	14	14	75	−61	2	Qualification to championship play-out
17	Agnita	16	1	4	11	17	72	−55	1 (Note: Agnita were deducted 6 points.)	Qualification to championship play-out

Rules for classification: 1) Points; 2) Head-to-head points; 3) Head-to-head goal difference; 4) Head-to-head goals scored; 5) Head-to-head away goals scored; 6) Goal difference; 7) Goals scored.
Notes:

Championship play-off

In the championship play-off, each team plays every other team twice. Teams start the play-off round with their points from the regular season halved and rounded up, with no other records carried over.

Pos	Team	Pld	W	D	L	GF	GA	GD	Pts	Qualification
1	Inter Sibiu (C, Q)	10	10	0	0	53	7	+46	54	Qualification to promotion play-off
2	Păltiniș Rășinari	10	7	0	3	35	26	+9	41	
3	Avrig	10	6	1	3	45	26	+19	40	
4	Unirea Miercurea Sibiului	10	3	1	6	18	33	−15	28	
5	Sparta Mediaș	10	3	0	7	21	37	−16	28	
6	Dumbrăveni	10	0	0	10	13	56	−43	15	

Rules for classification: 1) Points; 2) Head-to-head points; 3) Head-to-head goal difference; 4) Head-to-head goals scored; 5) Head-to-head away goals scored; 6) Goal difference; 7) Goals scored.
(C) Champions; (Q) Qualified for the phase indicated

Championship play-out

In the championship play-out, each team plays every other team once. Teams start the play-out round with their points from the regular season halved and rounded up, with no other records carried over.

Pos	Team	Pld	W	D	L	GF	GA	GD	Pts	Relegation
7	Quantum/Cuantic Arsenal Sibiu	10	8	1	1	33	6	+27	38	
8	Bradu	10	8	0	2	42	20	+22	35	
9	Interstar Sibiu	10	8	1	1	31	7	+24	32	
10	Leii Șura Mică	10	5	2	3	33	18	+15	27	
11	Voința Sibiu	10	5	0	5	23	31	−8	23	
12	Copșa Mică	10	4	1	5	37	30	+7	22	
13	Tălmaciu (R)	10	3	4	3	33	25	+8	20	Relegation to Liga V Sibiu
14	Măgura Cisnădie (R)	10	4	0	6	23	39	−16	18	Relegation to Liga V Sibiu
15	Vulturul Poplaca (R)	10	1	3	6	24	39	−15	10	Relegation to Liga V Sibiu
16	Agnita (R)	10	1	1	8	14	34	−20	5	Relegation to Liga V Sibiu
17	ASA Sibiu (R)	10	1	1	8	14	58	−44	5	Relegation to Liga V Sibiu

Rules for classification: 1) Points; 2) Head-to-head points; 3) Head-to-head goal difference; 4) Head-to-head goals scored; 5) Head-to-head away goals scored; 6) Goal difference; 7) Goals scored.
(R) Relegated

=== Suceava County ===
Team changes from the 2019–20 season

- FC Pojorâta, LPS Suceava, Zimbrul Siret and Sporting Poieni Solca withdrew.

Pos	Team	Pld	W	D	L	GF	GA	GD	Pts	Qualification
1	Juniorul Suceava	18	13	3	2	69	17	+52	42	Qualification to championship play-off
2	Șomuzul Preutești	18	11	2	5	43	29	+14	35	Qualification to championship play-off
3	Siretul Dolhasca	18	9	5	4	29	21	+8	32	Qualification to championship play-off
4	Moldova Drăgușeni	18	9	4	5	41	25	+16	31	Qualification to championship play-off
5	Viitorul Liteni	18	10	0	8	39	34	+5	30	Qualification to championship play-out
6	ASA Rarău Câmpulung Moldovenesc	18	6	5	7	21	22	−1	23	Qualification to championship play-out
7	Progresul Frătăuții Vechi	18	6	3	9	30	34	−4	21	Qualification to championship play-out
8	Concordia Grămești	18	4	2	12	28	57	−29	14	Qualification to championship play-out
9	Recolta Fântânele	18	4	2	12	26	59	−33	14	Qualification to championship play-out
10	Victoria Vatra Moldoviței	18	3	4	11	19	47	−28	13	Qualification to championship play-out

Rules for classification: 1) Points; 2) Head-to-head points; 3) Head-to-head goal difference; 4) Head-to-head goals scored; 5) Head-to-head away goals scored; 6) Goal difference; 7) Goals scored.

Championship play-off

The championship play-off was played between the top four teams of the regular season, each team meeting the others twice. Teams started the play-off with their points from the regular season halved, rounded upwards, and no other records were carried over from the regular season.

Pos	Team	Pld	W	D	L	GF	GA	GD	Pts	Qualification
1	Juniorul Suceava (C, Q)	6	4	1	1	17	7	+10	34	Qualification to promotion play-off
2	Moldova Drăgușeni	6	3	1	2	10	10	0	26	
3	Siretul Dolhasca	6	2	1	3	12	13	−1	23	
4	Șomuzul Preutești	6	1	1	4	9	18	−9	22	

Rules for classification: 1) Points; 2) Points without rounding; 3) Head-to-head points; 4) Head-to-head goal difference; 5) Head-to-head goals scored; 6) Head-to-head away goals scored; 7) Goal difference; 8) Goals scored.
(C) Champions; (Q) Qualified for the phase indicated

Championship play-out

The championship play-out was played between the bottom six teams of the regular season, each team meeting the others once. Teams started the play-out with their points from the regular season halved, rounded upwards, and no other records were carried over from the regular season.

Pos	Team	Pld	W	D	L	GF	GA	GD	Pts
5	Progresul Frătăuții Vechi	5	4	0	1	12	8	+4	23
6	ASA Rarău Câmpulung Moldovenesc	5	3	0	2	14	6	+8	21
7	Concordia Grămești	5	4	0	1	16	6	+10	19
8	Viitorul Liteni	5	0	0	5	0	15	−15	15
9	Recolta Fântânele	5	2	0	3	11	15	−4	13
10	Victoria Vatra Moldoviței	5	2	0	3	8	11	−3	13

Rules for classification: 1) Points; 2) Points without rounding; 3) Head-to-head points; 4) Head-to-head goal difference; 5) Head-to-head goals scored; 6) Head-to-head away goals scored; 7) Goal difference; 8) Goals scored.

=== Teleorman County ===
Team changes from the 2019–20 season

- Unirea Țigănești and Avântul Stejaru withdrew.
- Dunărea Turris Turnu Măgurele took the place of Cetatea Turnu Măgurele.
- Dinamic Kids Videle, CS Vârtoape, Sporting Roșiori II and Progresul Smirdioasa were admitted upon request.

Series I

Pos	Team	Pld	W	D	L	GF	GA	GD	Pts	Qualification or relegation
1	Rapid Buzescu	16	14	1	1	60	10	+50	43	Qualification to championship play-off
2	Dinamic Kids Videle	16	12	1	3	49	19	+30	37	Qualification to championship play-off
3	Vârtoape	16	10	2	4	46	25	+21	32	Qualification to championship play-off
4	Alexandria II	16	8	1	7	33	29	+4	25 (Note: Ajax Botoroaga–Alexandria II 1–1; Alexandria II–Ajax Botoroaga 2–0.)	Qualification to championship play-off
5	Ajax Botoroaga	16	7	4	5	46	25	+21	25	
6	Drăgănești-Vlașca	16	7	2	7	41	30	+11	23	
7	Atletic Orbeasca	16	5	1	10	25	48	−23	16	
8	Viitorul Butești (R)	16	2	0	14	16	92	−76	6	Relegation to Liga V Teleorman
9	Unirea Moșteni (Note: Unirea Moșteni withdrew after 9 rounds and lost all remaining matches with 0–3.) (R)	16	1	0	15	17	55	−38	3	Relegation to Liga V Teleorman

Rules for classification: 1) Points; 2) Head-to-head points; 3) Head-to-head goal difference; 4) Head-to-head goals scored; 5) Head-to-head away goals scored; 6) Goal difference; 7) Goals scored.
(R) Relegated
Notes:

Series II

Pos	Team	Pld	W	D	L	GF	GA	GD	Pts	Qualification or relegation
1	Dunărea Turris Turnu Măgurele	16	16	0	0	106	5	+101	48	Qualification to championship play-off
2	Astra Plosca	16	10	2	4	36	28	+8	32	Qualification to championship play-off
3	Metalul Peretu	16	9	2	5	47	25	+22	29 (Note: Voința Saelele–Metalul Peretu 1–1; Metalul Peretu–Voința Saelele 9–1.)	Qualification to championship play-off
4	Voința Saelele 2017	16	9	2	5	36	28	+8	29	Qualification to championship play-off
5	Avântul Bragadiru	16	8	3	5	28	14	+14	27	
6	Steaua Spătărei	16	5	3	8	29	34	−5	18	
7	Victoria Lunca	16	4	5	7	26	38	−12	17	
8	Sporting Roșiori II (R)	16	1	1	14	18	90	−72	4	Relegation to Liga V Teleorman
9	Progresul Smirdioasa (Note: Progresul Smirdioasa withdrew after 9 rounds and lost all remaining matches with 0–3.) (R)	16	1	0	15	8	72	−64	3	Relegation to Liga V Teleorman

Rules for classification: 1) Points; 2) Head-to-head points; 3) Head-to-head goal difference; 4) Head-to-head goals scored; 5) Head-to-head away goals scored; 6) Goal difference; 7) Goals scored.
(R) Relegated
Notes:

Championship play-off

The Championship play-off was played between the first four ranked teams in each series for the designation of the county champion. The quarter-finals, semi-finals and final would be played in a double-leg format.

Quarterfinals

The first legs was played on 30 April, and the second legs was played on 7 May 2022.

Team 1	Agg.	Team 2	1st leg	2nd leg
Metalul Peretu	5–5 (2–3 p)	Rapid Buzescu	1–5	4–0
Dinamic Kids Videle	5–3	Voința Saelele 2017	5–1	0–2
Alexandria II	1–10	Astra Plosca	0–3	1–7
Dunărea Turris Turnu Măgurele	11–0	Vârtoape	7–0	4–0

Semifinals

The first legs was played on 14 May, and the second legs was played on 21 May 2022.

Team 1	Agg.	Team 2	1st leg	2nd leg
Rapid Buzescu	3–4	Astra Plosca	2–2	1–2
Dunărea Turris Turnu Măgurele	7–0	Dinamic Kids Videle	6–0	1–0

Final

The first legs was played on 28 May, and the second legs on 4 June 2022.

Team 1	Agg.	Team 2	1st leg	2nd leg
Astra Plosca	1–8	Dunărea Turris Turnu Măgurele	1–1	0–7

Dunărea Turris Turnu Măgurele won the Liga IV Teleorman County and qualified for the promotion play-off in Liga III.

=== Timiș County ===
Team changes from the 2019–20 season

- Avântul Periam achieved promotion to the 2020–21 Liga III.
- Pobeda Stár Bišnov achieved promotion to the 2021–22 Liga III, following the 2020–21 short tournament.
- Fortuna Becicherecu Mic was relegated from the 2020–21 Liga III.
- CS Comloșu Mare (Series I winners), Progresul Gătaia (Series II winners), and Avântul Topolovățu Mare (Series III winners) were promoted from Liga V Timiș.
- CSC Dudeștii Noi, Rapid Săcălaz, and AS Seceani withdrew.
- Flacăra Parța, Atletico Liebling, and Unirea Grabaț were admitted upon request.
- ACS Carani was renamed ACS Sânandrei Carani.

Pos	Team	Pld	W	D	L	GF	GA	GD	Pts	Qualification or relegation
1	Phoenix Buziaș (C, Q)	38	30	5	3	158	24	+134	95	Qualification to promotion play-off
2	Lugoj	38	26	6	6	98	26	+72	84	
3	Flacăra Parța	38	26	5	7	125	43	+82	83	
4	Comloșu Mare	38	26	5	7	96	41	+55	83	
5	Peciu Nou	38	25	4	9	105	49	+56	79	
6	Unirea Sânnicolau Mare	38	19	8	11	88	56	+32	65	
7	Unirea Tomnatic	38	18	8	12	84	55	+29	62	
8	Millenium Giarmata	38	18	8	12	73	53	+20	62	
9	Timișul Șag	38	17	9	12	88	61	+27	60	
10	Cocoșul Orțișoara	38	16	9	13	76	63	+13	57	
11	Progresul Ciacova	38	15	7	16	68	74	−6	52	
12	UVT Timișoara	38	14	7	17	89	80	+9	49	
13	Progresul Gătaia	38	14	3	21	79	88	−9	45	
14	Avântul Topolovățu Mare	38	12	7	19	71	79	−8	43	
15	Deta	38	13	4	21	63	107	−44	43	
16	Voința Mașloc	38	11	8	19	74	105	−31	41	
17	Fortuna Becicherecu Mic	38	12	2	24	69	132	−63	38	
18	Atletico Liebling (Note: Atletico Liebling was spared from relegation due to the promotion of Phoenix Buziaș in Liga III.)	38	10	4	24	47	86	−39	34	Spared from relegation
19	Sânandrei Carani (R)	38	3	1	34	38	204	−166	10	Relegation to Liga V Timiș
20	Unirea Grabaț (Note: Unirea Grabaț withdrew after 19 rounds and lost all the remaining matches with 0–3.) (R)	38	0	0	38	19	182	−163	0	Relegation to Liga V Timiș

Rules for classification: 1) Points; 2) Head-to-head points; 3) Head-to-head goal difference; 4) Head-to-head goals scored; 5) Head-to-head away goals scored; 6) Goal difference; 7) Goals scored.
(C) Champions; (Q) Qualified for the phase indicated; (R) Relegated

=== Tulcea County ===
Team changes from the 2019–20 season

- Săgeata Stejaru, Partizanul Luncavița, Delta Tulcea, Luceafărul Slava Cercheză, Heracleea Enisala and Ceres Min Ceamurlia de Jos were admitted upon request.

Series A

Pos	Team	Pld	W	D	L	GF	GA	GD	Pts	Qualification or relegation
1	Săgeata Stejaru	12	11	0	1	70	12	+58	33	Qualification to championship play-off
2	Flacăra Mihail Kogălniceanu	12	10	0	2	52	21	+31	30	Qualification to championship play-off
3	Partizanul Luncavița	12	7	1	4	42	22	+20	22	Qualification to championship play-off
4	Delta Tulcea	12	6	1	5	36	35	+1	19	Qualification to championship play-off
5	Beroe Ostrov	12	2	1	9	27	67	−40	7	
6	Viitorul Horia	12	2	1	9	25	69	−44	7	
7	Progresul Isaccea	12	1	2	9	17	43	−26	5 (Note: Progresul Isaccea withdrew in the second half and lost all remaining matches with 0–3.)	
8	Triumf Cerna	0	0	0	0	0	0	0	0 (Note: Triumf Cerna withdrew in the first half and all its results were canceled.)	Withdrew

Rules for classification: 1) Points; 2) Head-to-head points; 3) Head-to-head goal difference; 4) Head-to-head goals scored; 5) Head-to-head away goals scored; 6) Goal difference; 7) Goals scored.
Notes:

Series B

Pos	Team	Pld	W	D	L	GF	GA	GD	Pts	Qualification or relegation
1	Granitul Babadag	14	12	0	2	55	17	+38	36	Qualification to championship play-off
2	Pescărușul Sarichioi	14	12	0	2	68	15	+53	36	Qualification to championship play-off
3	Viitorul Murighiol	14	11	1	2	57	20	+37	34	Qualification to championship play-off
4	Șoimii Topolog	14	7	1	6	52	25	+27	22	Qualification to championship play-off
5	Luceafărul Slava Cercheză	14	4	1	9	17	51	−34	13	
6	Național Somova	14	3	0	11	18	57	−39	9	
7	Ceres Min Ceamurlia de Jos	14	2	2	10	16	56	−40	8	
8	Heracleea Enisala	14	2	1	11	17	59	−42	7	

Rules for classification: 1) Points; 2) Head-to-head points; 3) Head-to-head goal difference; 4) Head-to-head goals scored; 5) Head-to-head away goals scored; 6) Goal difference; 7) Goals scored.

Championship play-off

The top four teams from each of the two series qualified for the championship play-off's qualifying round, from which the winners advanced to the final tournament, held in a double round-robin format.

Qualifying round

The first legs were played on 22 April, while the second legs took place on 30 April 2022.

Team 1	Agg.	Team 2	1st leg	2nd leg
Șoimii Topolog	4–9	Săgeata Stejaru	3–4	1–5
Viitorul Murighiol	5–2	Flacăra Mihail Kogălniceanu	2–2	3–0
Delta Tulcea	2–4	Granitul Babadag	1–2	1–2
Partizanul Luncavița	1–8	Pescărușul Sarichioi	1–5	0–3

Play-off table

Pos	Team	Pld	W	D	L	GF	GA	GD	Pts	Qualification
1	Viitorul Murighiol (C, Q)	6	5	0	1	16	4	+12	15	Qualification to promotion play-off
2	Săgeata Stejaru	6	3	0	3	12	13	−1	9	
3	Pescărușul Sarichioi	6	2	0	4	11	13	−2	6	
4	Granitul Babadag	6	2	0	4	9	18	−9	6	

Rules for classification: 1) Points; 2) Head-to-head points; 3) Head-to-head goal difference; 4) Head-to-head goals scored; 5) Head-to-head away goals scored; 6) Goal difference; 7) Goals scored.
(C) Champions; (Q) Qualified for the phase indicated

=== Vaslui County ===
The Liga IV Vaslui County was played in a double round-robin format featuring twelve teams. The winners qualified for the promotion play-off to Liga III, while the bottom two teams were relegated. The 9th- and 10th-placed teams faced the 3rd- and 4th-placed teams from Liga V Vaslui in the promotion/relegation play-offs.

Team changes from the 2019–20 season

- Sporting Juniorul Vaslui achieved promotion to 2020–21 Liga III.
- Victoria Muntenii de Jos (Vaslui East Series winners) and Viitorul Văleni (Vaslui East Series runners-up) were promoted from Liga V Vaslui.
- CSM Vaslui, Racova Pușcași, Atletic Bârlad and Sporting Bârlad withdrew.
- Juniorul Bârlad and Comstar Vaslui were admitted upon request.

Pos	Team	Pld	W	D	L	GF	GA	GD	Pts	Qualification or relegation
1	Rapid Brodoc (C, Q)	22	19	2	1	105	15	+90	59	Qualification to promotion play-off
2	Vulturești	22	16	2	4	62	31	+31	50	
3	Viitorul Vetrișoaia	22	14	3	5	57	34	+23	45	
4	Flacăra Muntenii de Sus	22	14	2	6	49	35	+14	44	
5	Vitis Șuletea	22	9	3	10	46	43	+3	30	
6	Gârceni	22	9	3	10	39	41	−2	30	
7	Comstar Vaslui	22	8	4	10	62	59	+3	28	
8	Victoria Muntenii de Jos	22	6	3	13	44	57	−13	21	
9	Crețești (O)	22	6	2	14	51	87	−36	20	Qualification to relegation play-out
10	Viitorul Văleni (O)	22	5	3	14	35	69	−34	18 (Note: Viitorul Văleni are ahead of Negrești on Head-to-head away goals scored: Negrești 4–2 Viitorul Văleni, Viitorul Văleni 2–0 Negrești.)	Qualification to relegation play-out
11	Negrești (R)	22	5	3	14	45	78	−33	18	Relegation to Liga V Vaslui
12	Juniorul Bârlad (R)	22	5	2	15	36	82	−46	17	Relegation to Liga V Vaslui

Rules for classification: 1) Points; 2) Head-to-head points; 3) Head-to-head goal difference; 4) Head-to-head goals scored; 5) Head-to-head away goals scored; 6) Goal difference; 7) Goals scored.
(C) Champions; (O) Play-off winners; (Q) Qualified for the phase indicated; (R) Relegated
Notes:

Relegation play-out

The first leg was played on 11 and 12 June, and the second leg on 19 June 2022.

Team 1	Agg.	Team 2	1st leg	2nd leg
Viitorul Văleni	5–4	Gloria Mânjești	3–1	2–3 (a.e.t.)
Crețești	9–7	Ivacec Vaslui	3–5	6–2

=== Vâlcea County ===
Team changes from the 2019–20 season

- Minerul Costești achieved promotion to 2020–21 Liga III.
- Oltețul Alunu (Series II winners), Lotru Brezoi (Series II runners-up), CS Mădulari (Series II 3rd place), and Foresta Malaia (Series II 4th place) were promoted from Liga V Vâlcea.
- Oltul Drăgoești, AS Băile Olănești, Oltul Ionești and CSC Orlești withdrew.
- Sparta Râmnicu Vâlcea, Minerul Berbești and Olympic Râmnicu Vâlcea were admitted upon request.

Pos	Team	Pld	W	D	L	GF	GA	GD	Pts	Qualification or relegation
1	Cozia Călimănești (C, Q)	26	23	2	1	145	11	+134	71	Qualification for promotion play-off
2	Sparta Râmnicu Vâlcea	26	21	3	2	123	19	+104	66	
3	Mădulari	26	22	0	4	85	24	+61	66	
4	Chimia 1973 Râmnicu Vâlcea	26	13	4	9	54	53	+1	43	
5	Păușești Otăsău	26	12	5	9	87	56	+31	41	
6	Viitorul Budești	26	11	3	12	63	77	−14	36	
7	Unirea Tomșani	26	9	3	14	46	73	−27	30	
8	Băbeni	26	9	2	15	62	82	−20	29	
9	Lotru Brezoi	26	9	2	15	49	77	−28	29	
10	Minerul Berbești	26	8	4	14	61	78	−17	28	
11	Stejarul Vlădești	26	9	0	17	51	111	−60	27	
12	Oltețul Alunu	26	8	2	16	42	71	−29	26	
13	Foresta Malaia (Note: Foresta Malaia was spared from relegation due to the promotion of Cozia Călimănești in Liga III.)	26	7	3	16	49	88	−39	24	Spared from relegation
14	Olympic Râmnicu Vâlcea (R)	26	3	3	20	45	142	−97	12	Relegation to Liga V Vâlcea

Rules for classification: 1) Points; 2) Head-to-head points; 3) Head-to-head goal difference; 4) Head-to-head goals scored; 5) Head-to-head away goals scored; 6) Goal difference; 7) Goals scored.
(C) Champions; (Q) Qualified for the phase indicated; (R) Relegated

=== Vrancea County ===
Team changes from the 2019–20 season

- Inizio Focșani and Prosport Focșani were reinstated from the 2020–21 short tournament.
- Voința Slobozia Ciorăști, Unirea Milcovul, Victoria Zimbrul Bordeasca, Săgeata Biliești, Național Golești and Unirea Țifești withdrew.
- CSM Adjud 1946, CSM Focșani II, Viitorul Mărășești and Voința Sihlea were admitted upon request.

Group A

Pos	Team	Pld	W	D	L	GF	GA	GD	Pts	Qualification
1	Victoria Gugești	14	12	2	0	58	12	+46	38	Qualification to championship play-off
2	Adjud 1946	14	9	2	3	53	11	+42	29	Qualification to championship play-off
3	Panciu	14	8	3	3	31	12	+19	27	Qualification to championship play-off
4	Focșani II (Note: Focșani II withdrew after 12 rounds.) (D)	12	6	2	4	22	23	−1	20	Withdrew
5	Tractorul Nănești (Note: Prosport Focșani qualified for the play-offs because Tractorul Nănești, the team that finished 5th, did not have a junior team and was therefore ineligible for promotion.)	14	4	1	9	20	36	−16	13	Qualification to championship play-out
6	Prosport Focșani	13	3	2	8	23	43	−20	11	Qualification to championship play-off
7	Dinamo Tătăranu	14	3	0	11	13	55	−42	9	Qualification to championship play-out
8	Jariștea (Note: Jariștea withdrew after 13 rounds.) (D)	13	2	2	9	13	41	−28	8	Withdrew

Rules for classification: 1) Points; 2) Head-to-head points; 3) Head-to-head goal difference; 4) Head-to-head goals scored; 5) Head-to-head away goals scored; 6) Goal difference; 7) Goals scored.
(D) Disqualified
Notes:

Group B

Pos	Team	Pld	W	D	L	GF	GA	GD	Pts	Qualification
1	Inizio Focșani	14	13	1	0	38	9	+29	40	Qualification to championship play-off
2	Viitorul Mărășești	14	9	1	4	36	21	+15	28	Qualification to championship play-off
3	Dumbrăveni	14	8	1	5	40	20	+20	25	Qualification to championship play-off
4	Homocea	14	8	1	5	31	21	+10	25	Qualification to championship play-off
5	Sportul Ciorăști	14	6	2	6	23	18	+5	20	Qualification to championship play-out
6	Siretul Suraia	14	4	3	7	34	38	−4	15	Qualification to championship play-out
7	Voința Sihlea	14	2	1	11	17	59	−42	7	Qualification to championship play-out
8	Trotușul Ruginești	14	1	0	13	16	49	−33	3	Qualification to championship play-out

Rules for classification: 1) Points; 2) Head-to-head points; 3) Head-to-head goal difference; 4) Head-to-head goals scored; 5) Head-to-head away goals scored; 6) Goal difference; 7) Goals scored.

Championship play-off

The results between the qualified teams were carried over to the championship play-off, where each team played eight rounds against opponents from the other group only.

Pos	Team	Pld	W	D	L	GF	GA	GD	Pts	Qualification
1	Victoria Gugești (C, Q)	14	12	2	0	40	11	+29	38	Qualification to promotion play-off
2	Inizio Focșani	14	12	1	1	36	11	+25	37	
3	Adjud 1946	14	6	2	6	26	25	+1	20	
4	Dumbrăveni	14	6	0	8	23	28	−5	18	
5	Viitorul Mărășești	14	5	2	7	25	24	+1	17	
6	Panciu	14	4	3	7	21	21	0	15	
7	Prosport Focșani	14	3	0	11	26	58	−32	9	
8	Homocea	14	2	2	10	19	38	−19	8	

Rules for classification: 1) Points; 2) Head-to-head points; 3) Head-to-head goal difference; 4) Head-to-head goals scored; 5) Head-to-head away goals scored; 6) Goal difference; 7) Goals scored.
(C) Champions; (Q) Qualified for the phase indicated

Championship play-out

Pos	Team	Pld	W	D	L	GF	GA	GD	Pts	Relegation
9	Siretul Suraia	10	6	3	1	23	8	+15	21	
10	Tractorul Nănești	10	6	1	3	27	16	+11	19	
11	Sportul Ciorăști	10	5	1	4	26	20	+6	16	
12	Trotușul Ruginești	10	5	1	4	24	23	+1	16	
13	Voința Sihlea	10	4	2	4	20	19	+1	14	
14	Dinamo Tătăranu (R)	10	0	0	10	7	41	−34	0	Relegation to Liga V Vrancea

Rules for classification: 1) Points; 2) Head-to-head points; 3) Head-to-head goal difference; 4) Head-to-head goals scored; 5) Head-to-head away goals scored; 6) Goal difference; 7) Goals scored.
(R) Relegated

== See also ==
- 2021–22 Liga I
- 2021–22 Liga II
- 2021–22 Liga III
- 2021–22 Cupa României
