= CS Gloria Ultra =

Romanian football club

Gloria Ultra
- Full name: Clubul Sportiv Gloria Ultra
- Nicknames: Păunii (The Peacocks); Dorohoienii (The people from Dorohoi)
- Short name: Gloria
- Founded: 1987 as Rapid Brodoc; 2016 as Rapid Brodoc (refounded)
- Dissolved: 2025
- Ground: Municipal
- Capacity: 2,000
- 2024–25: Liga III, Seria I, 4th
- Website: https://gloriaultra.ro/
Home colours	Away colours

Clubul Sportiv Gloria Ultra, also known as Gloria Ultra, or just Gloria and formerly known as Rapid Brodoc ws a Romanian football club based in Dorohoi, Botoșani County, which last played in Liga III, the third tier of Romanian football.

== History ==
The club was originally founded in 1987 as Rapid Brodoc and played in the Vaslui County Championships until 1992 when was disbanded.

In 2016, the local businessman Cezar Bahrim decided to reactivate the football club from Brodoc and enrolled the team in Liga V – Vaslui County, the fifth tier of the Romanian football league system, finishing on 4th place in the Series II, and 4th in the Series A of Liga V play-offs.

Rapid Brodoc promoted to Liga IV – Vaslui County at the end of the 2017–18 season. Rapid finished 2nd in Series I and reached the final of the fifth league, where lost to FC Vulturești 1–3.

The club finished in the top places, but with no success, until in the 2021–22 season when the club won the league, and beating Sportul Onești and promoted to Liga III

In their first 2 seasons in Liga III the club finished in 7th place, respectively 8th place.

The club withdrew from Liga III, due to financial problems, but the club decided to not withdraw anymore from the league.

The club was also moved from Brodoc, to Dorohoi and was renamed to Gloria Ultra.

== Grounds ==
Since 2024, Gloria Ultra plays its home matches on Municipal Stadium in Dorohoi, Botoșani County, arena that has a capacity of 2,000 seats and was used in the past as the home ground of local teams Cristalul Dorohoi, Fulgerul Dorohoi, FCM Dorohoi or Inter Dorohoi, but was also the home ground of various teams such as FC Botoșani II or Dante Botoșani.

Until 2024, the club was known as Rapid Brodoc and used to play its home matches on Brodoc Ground or on Vaslui Municipal Stadium, after its promotion to Liga III.

== Honours ==
Liga IV – Vaslui County

- Winners (1): 2021–22

== League history ==
Season	Tier	Division	Place	Notes	Cupa României
2024–25	3	Liga III (Seria I)	4th	Withdrew	
2023–24	3	Liga III (Seria I)	8th		Third Round

Season	Tier	Division	Place	Notes	Cupa României
2022–23	3	Liga III (Seria I)	7th		
2021–22	4	Liga IV (VS)	1st (C)	Promoted	
