= Stadionul Municipal (Dorohoi) =

Sports venue in Dorohoi, Romania

- Interactive map of Stadionul Municipal
- Former names: Stadionul 1 Mai
- Address: Str. 1 Decembrie
- Location: Dorohoi, Romania
- Coordinates: 47°57′0.81″N 26°23′6″E
- Owner: Municipality of Dorohoi
- Operator: Inter Dorohoi
- Capacity: 2,000 seated
- Surface: Grass

Construction
- Renovated: 2014

Tenants
- Cristalul Dorohoi; Fulgerul Dorohoi; Dorohoi (2010–2015); Inter Dorohoi (2013–2016, 2017–present); Botoșani II (2018–2020); Dante Botoșani (2020–2023); Gloria Ultra (2024–2025)

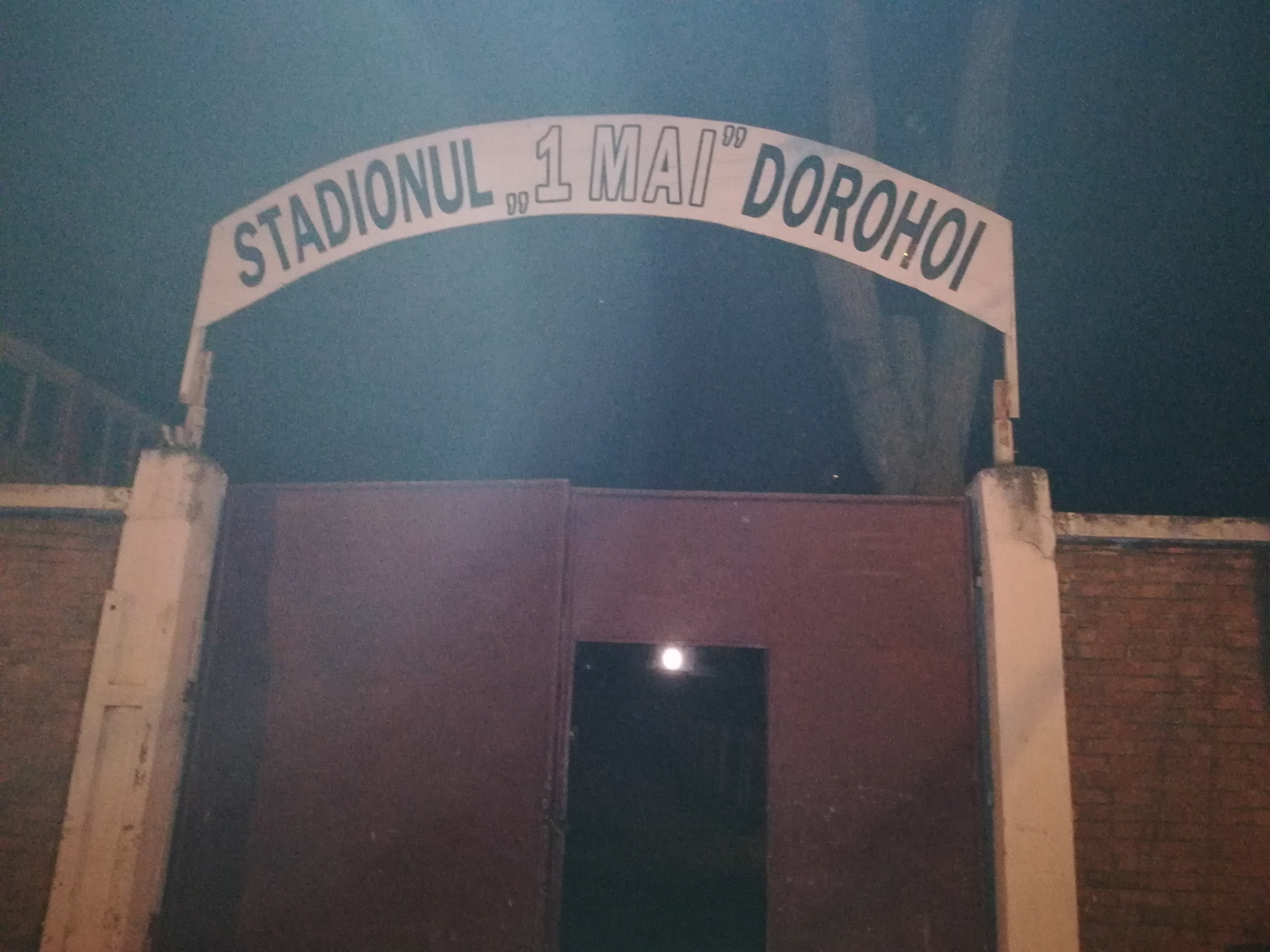

Stadionul Municipal is a multi-use stadium in Dorohoi, Botoșani County, Romania. It is currently used mostly for football matches, it holds 2,000 people and is the home ground of the local team Inter Dorohoi.
