= CS Dante Botoșani =

Romanian football club

Dante Botoșani
- Full name: Club Sportiv Dante Botoșani
- Nicknames: Botoșenenii (The Botoșani People)
- Short name: Dante
- Founded: 2002
- Dissolved: 2023
- Ground: Municipal / Bucecea
- Capacity: 2,000 / 500
- 2022–23: Liga III, Seria I, 10th (relegated)
Home colours	Away colours

Club Sportiv Dante Botoșani, commonly known as Dante Botoșani, or simply as Dante, was a Romanian football club based in Botoșani, Botoșani County. The club was founded in 2002 and played only in amateur leagues until 2020, when it promoted to Liga III.

== History ==
Dante Botoșani was established in 2002 and played only in the amateur leagues until 2020, when it promoted to Liga III, after winning Liga IV Botoșani and the promotion play-off group against Sporting Vaslui and Viitorul Curița. In the first season ever spent at the level of the third tier, Dante was ranked 6th out of 10.

Dante is owned by Victor Mihalachi, a businessman who also held FCM Dorohoi, between 2010 and 2015. The team is considered as the second important club in the Botoșani County, after top-flight side FC Botoșani.

== Ground ==
The second club of Botoșani County, played its home matches on the Municipal Stadium, in Dorohoi, with a capacity of 2,000 seats. Some of their home matches were played on Baza Sportivă Bucecea, based in Bucecea, Botoșani County, a football ground opened in 2022, with a capacity of 500 seats and an artificial turf.

== Honours ==
Liga III

- Winners (1): 2021–22

Liga IV – Botoșani County

- Winners (1): 2019–20
- Runners-up (1): 2012–13

Liga V – Botoșani County

- Winners (1): 2018–19
- Runners-up (1): 2011–12

== League history ==
Season	Tier	Division	Place	Notes	Cupa României
2022–23	3	Liga III (Seria I)	10th (R)	Relegated	
2021–22	3	Liga III (Seria I)	1st (C)		
2020–21	3	Liga III (Seria I)	6th		
2019–20	4	Liga IV (BT)	1st (C, P)	Promoted	
2018–19	5	Liga V (BT)	1st (C, P)	Promoted	

Season	Tier	Division	Place	Notes	Cupa României
2017–18	U15	Youth Level (BT)	2nd		
2016–17	U17	Youth Level (BT)	1st (C)	Champion	
2015–16	U17	Youth Level (BT)	5th		
2014–15	4	Liga IV (BT)	15th (R)	Relegated	
