= Bogdan Șandru =

Romanian footballer

Personal information
- Full name: Bogdan Andrei Șandru
- Date of birth: 4 July 1989 (age 37)
- Place of birth: Băicoi, Romania
- Height: 1.86 m (6 ft 1 in)
- Position: Defender

Team information
- Current team: Tunari

Youth career
- Tricolorul Breaza

Senior career*
| Years | Team | Apps | (Gls) |
| 2008–2010 | Tricolorul Breaza | 13 | (0) |
| 2009 | → AFC Filipeștii de Pădure (loan) | 0 | (0) |
| 2010–2013 | CSMS Iași | 5 | (0) |
| 2011–2013 | → Unirea Câmpina (loan) | 0 | (0) |
| 2013–2014 | Fortuna Poiana Câmpina | 11 | (0) |
| 2015–2017 | Pandurii Târgu Jiu | 13 | (1) |
| 2016 | → Universitatea Cluj (loan) | 5 | (0) |
| 2016–2017 | → Dunărea Călărași (loan) | 25 | (5) |
| 2017–2018 | Dunărea Călărași | 33 | (2) |
| 2019 | Chindia Târgoviște | 17 | (0) |
| 2019–2021 | Dunărea Călărași | 44 | (8) |
| 2022 | SCM Zalău | 13 | (4) |
| 2022 | Blejoi | 13 | (5) |
| 2023– | Tunari | 0 | (0) |
- * Club domestic league appearances and goals as of 12:52, 20 December 2022 (UTC)

Bogdan Andrei Șandru (born 4 July 1989) is a Romanian professional footballer who plays as a defender for Liga III side CS Tunari.

== Honours ==
Tricolorul Breaza

- Liga III: 2008–09

Unirea Câmpina

- Liga IV – Prahova County: 2011–12

Fortuna Poiana Câmpina

- Liga III: 2013–14

Dunărea Călărași

- Liga II: 2017–18

Chindia Târgoviște

- Liga II: 2018–19
