= FC Unirea Câmpina =

Unirea Câmpina
- Full name: Fotbal Club Unirea Câmpina
- Founded: 2004
- Dissolved: 2013
- Ground: Rafinăria Steaua Română
- Capacity: 1,500
- 2012–13: Liga III, Seria VI, 3rd
- Website: https://fcunirea.blogspot.com/

Unirea Câmpina was a Romanian professional football club from Câmpina, Prahova County, founded in 2003 and dissolved in 2013.

== History ==
In the 2011–12 season, Unirea Câmpina, with Costin Plăvache on the bench, won Liga IV Prahova and promoted to Liga III after a play-off match with FC Chitila, won with the score of 2–1. The squad that achieved the promotion was composed of: : Daniel Șandru – Zecheru, Neagu, Bogdan Șandru, I. Filip, A. Stoica, G. Bărăgan, Lambă, L. Cernea, Ed. Bica, A. Ciobanu. Reserves: Ionescu – Coman, Nichifor, Dobrescu, Fl. Stoica, Ghiță, Singureanu.

In the next season of the Liga III, 2012–13, the team went to the 3rd place, but in the summer of 2013, the team was disbanded for lack of funds.

== Honours ==
Liga IV – Prahova County

- Winners (1): 2011–12

== League history ==
Season	Tier	Division	Place	Notes	Cupa României
2012–13	3	Liga III (Seria VI)	3rd		
2011–12	4	Liga IV (PH)	1st (C)	Promoted	
2010–11	4	Liga IV (PH)	10th		
2009–10	4	Liga IV (PH)	5th		
2008–09	4	Liga IV (PH)	9th		

== Former players ==
- (Romania) Bogdan Șandru

== Former managers ==
- (Romania) Costin Plăvache
- (Romania) Florin Stăncioiu
- (Romania) Marius Pălănceanu
