= 2011–12 Liga IV =

Liga IV
- Season: 2011–12
- Country: Romania

The 2011–12 Liga IV was the 70th season of the Liga IV, the fourth tier of the Romanian football league system. The champions of each county association play against one from a neighboring county in a play-off match played on a neutral venue. The winners of the play-off matches promoted to Liga III.

== Promotion play-off ==
The matches was scheduled to be played on 20 June 2012.

Team 1	Score	Team 2
Plimob Sighetu Marmației (MM)	2–1	(SJ) Flacăra Halmășd
Tricolorul Alparea (BH)	1–0	(SM) Someșul Cărășeu
Zagon (CV)	w/o (Note: The match, FC Zagon – Unirea Stâlpu, did not begin because the Stâlpu team does not have medical visas from the Sports Medicine Center.)	(BZ) Unirea Stâlpu
Lacul Ursu Mobila Sovata (MS)	1–5	(SB) Sevișul Șelimbăr
Făgăraș (BV)	5–1	(HR) Miercurea Ciuc
Europa Alba Iulia (AB)	2–0	(CJ) Vulturii Vultureni
Șoimii Pâncota (AR)	5–1	(HD) Vulcan
Lugoj (TM)	3–0	(MH) Pandurii Cerneți
Petrofac Țicleni (GJ)	1–2	(CS) Muncitorul Reșița
ASRA Apă Craiova (DJ)	3–2	(VL) Posada Perișani
SCM Pitești (AG)	2–0 (a.e.t.)	(OT) Viitorul Grădinile
Gloria Cornești (DB)	1–5	(IF) Progresul Cernica
Avântul Florești (GR)	3–1	(TR) Pamimai Videle
Chitila (B)	1–2	(PH) Unirea Câmpina
Victoria Traian (BR)	0–3	(IL) Rapid Fetești
Agigea (CT)	3–4	(CL) Venus Independența
Energia Vulturu (VN)	0–1	(TL) Unirea Casimcea
Moinești (BC)	5–0	(GL) Sporting Liești
Biruința Negrești (NT)	0–1	(VS) Huși
Bucovina Frătăuții Noi (SV)	3–1	(BN) Pro Someș Feldru
Microbuzul Botoșani (BT)	1–3	(IS) Știința Miroslava

== County leagues ==
=== Alba County ===
Pos	Team	Pld	W	D	L	GF	GA	GD	Pts	Qualification or relegation
1	Europa Alba Iulia (C, Q)	30	25	3	2	87	15	+72	78	Qualification to promotion play-off
2	CSO Cugir	30	24	5	1	105	18	+87	77	
3	Sportul Sebeș	30	16	7	7	65	28	+37	55 (Note: Sportul Sebeș–Performanța Ighiu 3-1; Performanța Ighiu–Sportul Sebeș 1–0.)	
4	Performanța Ighiu	30	19	1	10	71	35	+36	55 (Note: Performanța Ighiu deducted 3 points.)	
5	Dalia Sport Daia Romană	30	16	3	11	66	39	+27	51	
6	FC Cugir	30	14	6	10	61	44	+17	48	
7	Metalul Aiud	30	11	12	7	39	29	+10	45	
8	Rapid CFR Teiuș	30	12	4	14	39	56	−17	40	
9	Viitorul Sântimbru	30	12	3	15	56	53	+3	39	
10	Viitorul Unirea	30	11	5	14	40	44	−4	38	
11	Cuprirom Abrud	30	11	4	15	62	70	−8	37	
12	CIL Blaj	30	10	5	15	46	63	−17	35	
13	Olimpia Aiud	30	9	4	17	31	56	−25	31	
14	Ocna Mureș (R)	30	10	1	19	45	97	−52	31	Relegation to Liga V Alba
15	Arieșul Apuseni (R)	30	3	4	23	23	93	−70	13	Relegation to Liga V Alba
16	Flamura Roșie Rădești (R)	30	1	5	24	36	132	−96	8	Relegation to Liga V Alba

Rules for classification: 1) Points; 2) Head-to-head points; 3) Head-to-head goal difference; 4) Head-to-head goals scored; 5) Head-to-head away goals scored; 6) Goal difference; 7) Goals scored.
(C) Champions; (Q) Qualified for the phase indicated; (R) Relegated

=== Arad County ===
Pos	Team	Pld	W	D	L	GF	GA	GD	Pts	Qualification or relegation
1	Șoimii Pâncota (C, Q)	34	28	5	1	110	13	+97	89	Qualification to promotion play-off
2	Crișul Chișineu-Criș	34	26	5	3	93	30	+63	83	
3	Semlecana Semlac	34	17	6	11	73	46	+27	57	
4	Voința Mailat	34	16	8	10	70	46	+24	56	
5	Progresul Pecica	34	16	8	10	79	56	+23	56	
6	Unirea Sântana	34	17	5	12	77	62	+15	56	
7	Aqua Vest Arad	34	17	5	12	52	47	+5	56	
8	Ineu	34	17	4	13	93	66	+27	55	
9	UTA Arad II	34	14	9	11	55	44	+11	51	
10	Șoimii Tăuț	34	13	6	15	66	79	−13	45	
11	Frontiera Curtici	34	12	8	14	64	57	+7	44	
12	Banatul Sânnicolau Mic	34	12	7	15	55	72	−17	43	
13	Păulișana Păuliș	34	12	5	17	60	69	−9	41	
14	Victoria Zăbrani	34	11	6	17	52	68	−16	39	
15	Șiriana Șiria	34	11	5	18	53	88	−35	38	
16	Viitorul Satu Nou (R)	34	9	4	21	43	87	−44	31	Relegation to Liga V Arad
17	Sânleani (R)	34	5	3	26	36	134	−98	18	Relegation to Liga V Arad
18	Unirea Șeitin (R)	34	2	3	29	19	86	−67	9	Relegation to Liga V Arad

(C) Champions; (Q) Qualified for the phase indicated; (R) Relegated

=== Argeș County ===
Pos	Team	Pld	W	D	L	GF	GA	GD	Pts	Qualification or relegation
1	SCM Pitești (C, Q)	32	28	3	1	126	14	+112	87	Qualification to promotion play-off
2	Rucăr	32	26	5	1	99	16	+83	83	
3	FC Dănuț Coman	32	26	4	2	133	19	+114	82	
4	Viitorul Ștefănești	32	22	5	5	90	28	+62	71	
5	Bascov	32	17	6	9	78	54	+24	57	
6	Atletic Bradu II	32	18	2	12	85	57	+28	56	
7	Rapid Pitești	32	16	4	12	59	39	+20	52	
8	Dinamic Mioveni	32	13	5	14	62	56	+6	44	
9	DLR Pitești	32	12	5	15	64	78	−14	41	
10	Poenari de Muscel	32	9	8	15	49	64	−15	35	
11	Stâlpeni Rădești	32	11	1	20	77	94	−17	34	
12	Miroși	32	10	1	21	49	84	−35	31	
13	Unirea Costești	32	9	2	21	48	99	−51	29	
14	Domnești	32	8	4	20	53	103	−50	28	
15	Edilul Pitești (R)	32	8	3	21	46	101	−55	27	Relegation to Liga V Argeș
16	Olimpia Suseni (R)	32	5	6	21	40	104	−64	21	Relegation to Liga V Argeș
17	Top Arena Topoloveni (R)	32	1	2	29	27	175	−148	5	Relegation to Liga V Argeș

Rules for classification: 1) Points; 2) Head-to-head points; 3) Head-to-head goal difference; 4) Head-to-head goals scored; 5) Head-to-head away goals scored; 6) Goal difference; 7) Goals scored.
(C) Champions; (Q) Qualified for the phase indicated; (R) Relegated

=== Bacău County ===
Pos	Team	Pld	W	D	L	GF	GA	GD	Pts	Qualification or relegation
1	Moinești (C, Q)	34	30	2	2	183	22	+161	92	Qualification to promotion play-off
2	Sport Club Bacău II	34	25	4	5	143	34	+109	79	
3	Căiuți	34	23	5	6	97	45	+52	74	
4	Sportul Răcăciuni	34	23	4	7	107	43	+64	73	
5	Nicolae Bălcescu	34	20	4	10	100	65	+35	64	
6	Voința Oituz	34	18	7	9	89	54	+35	61 (Note: Voința Oituz–Consart Biruința Bacău 2–1; Consart Biruința Bacău–Voința Oituz 3–2)	
7	Consart Biruința Bacău	34	19	4	11	86	57	+29	61	
8	Voința Gârleni	34	12	7	15	50	80	−30	43	
9	Aerostar Bacău II	34	12	5	17	77	86	−9	41	
10	Negri	34	11	5	18	60	81	−21	38	
11	Filipești	34	10	5	19	69	87	−18	35 (Note: Filipești–Uzu Dărmănești 1–0; Uzu Dărmănești–Filipești 1–3)	
12	Uzu Dărmănești	34	10	5	19	47	86	−39	35	
13	Forestierul Agaș	34	10	4	20	45	87	−42	34 (Note: Forestierul Agaș–Flamura Roșie Sascut 2–1; Flamura Roșie Sascut–Forestierul Agaș 2–4)	
14	Flamura Roșie Sascut	34	10	4	20	48	93	−45	34	
15	Târgu Ocna	34	9	4	21	41	117	−76	31	
16	Athletic Comănești	34	8	4	22	65	120	−55	28 (Note: 1.Athletic Comănești 6 Pts.; 2.Siretul Bacău 6 Pts.; 3.Dofteana 6 Pts.)	
17	Siretul Bacău	34	9	1	24	59	131	−72	28	
18	Dofteana (R)	34	8	4	22	40	118	−78	28	Qualification to relegation play-off

Rules for classification: 1) Points; 2) Head-to-head points; 3) Head-to-head goal difference; 4) Head-to-head goals scored; 5) Head-to-head away goals scored; 6) Goal difference; 7) Goals scored.
(C) Champions; (Q) Qualified for the phase indicated; (R) Relegated

==== Relegation play-off ====
The 18th-placed team of the Liga IV faces the 2nd placed team from Liga V Bacău. The match played on 12 June 2011.

Team 1	Score	Team 2
Stejarul Buciumi	2–2 (4–1 p)	Dofteana

=== Bihor County ===
Pos	Team	Pld	W	D	L	GF	GA	GD	Pts	Qualification or relegation
1	Tricolorul Alparea (C, Q)	30	24	2	4	112	26	+86	74	Qualification for promotion play-off
2	Crișul Sântandrei	30	22	5	3	85	26	+59	71	
3	Kinder Junior Paleu	30	21	6	3	85	20	+65	69	
4	Luceafărul Oradea II	30	16	7	7	76	42	+34	55	
5	Poiana Budureasa	30	15	5	10	58	35	+23	50	
6	Victoria Avram Iancu	30	14	4	12	70	70	0	46	
7	Crișul Aleșd	30	12	5	13	61	56	+5	41	
8	Sânmartin-Mădăras	30	11	7	12	56	56	0	40	
9	Viitorul Borș	30	11	4	15	42	48	−6	37	
10	Ștei	30	10	7	13	46	56	−10	37	
11	Locadin Țețchea	30	12	1	17	57	90	−33	37	
12	Biharea Vașcău	30	10	6	14	35	62	−27	36	
13	Cetatea Biharia	30	9	8	13	68	61	+7	35	
14	Liberty Oradea (Note: Liberty Oradea was spared from relegation due to the promotion of Tricolorul Alparea to Liga III.)	30	8	2	20	45	69	−24	26	Spared from relegation
15	Stăruința Săcuieni (R)	30	5	3	22	42	123	−81	18	Relegation to Liga V Bihor
16	Viitorul Popești (R)	30	2	3	25	32	129	−97	9	Relegation to Liga V Bihor

Rules for classification: Rules for classification: 1) Points 2) Head-to-head points; 3) Head-to-head goal difference; 4) Head-to-head goals scored; 5) Head-to-head away goals scored; 6) Goal difference; 7) Goals scored.
(C) Champions; (Q) Qualified for the phase indicated; (R) Relegated

=== Bistrița-Năsăud County ===
Pos	Team	Pld	W	D	L	GF	GA	GD	Pts	Qualification or relegation
1	ProSomeș Feldru	30	25	2	3	96	20	+76	77	Qualification to promotion play-off
2	Heniu Prundu Bârgăului	30	23	4	3	108	37	+71	73	
3	Viitorul Lechința	30	23	3	4	145	45	+100	72	
4	Silvicultorul Maieru	30	18	5	7	117	66	+51	59	
5	Gironic Rebra	30	18	4	8	87	44	+43	58	
6	Progresul Jelna	30	16	4	10	87	65	+22	52	
7	Hebe Sângeorz-Băi	30	14	5	11	68	74	−6	47	
8	Steaua Monariu	30	11	4	15	54	77	−23	37	
9	Progresul Năsăud	30	11	2	17	38	64	−26	35	
10	Viticola Dumitra	30	10	3	17	44	62	−18	33	
11	Voința Cetate	30	9	6	15	56	76	−20	33	
12	Eciro Forest Telciu	30	10	1	19	41	72	−31	31	
13	Victoria Uriu	30	8	2	20	47	73	−26	26	
14	Universitatea Șirioara	30	7	4	19	38	84	−46	25	
15	Budac (R)	30	6	3	21	37	113	−76	21	Relegation to Liga V Bistrița-Năsăud
16	Unirea Bozieș (R)	30	4	2	24	43	134	−91	14	Relegation to Liga V Bistrița-Năsăud

Rules for classification: 1) Points; 2) Head-to-head points; 3) Head-to-head goal difference; 4) Head-to-head goals scored; 5) Head-to-head away goals scored; 6) Goal difference; 7) Goals scored.
(R) Relegated

=== Botoșani County ===
Pos	Team	Pld	W	D	L	GF	GA	GD	Pts	Qualification or relegation
1	Microbuzul Botoșani (C, Q)	26	20	3	3	90	24	+66	63	Qualification to promotion play-off
2	Roma	26	17	2	7	67	36	+31	53	
3	Avântul Albești	26	15	3	8	44	36	+8	48	
4	Luceafărul Mihai Eminescu	26	13	6	7	55	29	+26	45	
5	Sportivul Trușești	26	12	2	12	59	60	−1	38	
6	Prosport Vârfu Câmpului	26	11	4	11	41	54	−13	37	
7	Păltiniș	26	9	8	9	53	54	−1	35	
8	Rapid Ungureni	26	10	3	13	45	61	−16	33	
9	Darabani	26	8	7	11	48	35	+13	31	
10	Bucovina Rogojești	26	9	4	13	45	55	−10	31	
11	Flacăra 1907 Flămânzi	26	9	4	13	47	58	−11	31	
12	Bucecea	26	9	2	15	46	59	−13	29	
13	Voința Șendriceni (R)	26	7	5	14	42	70	−28	26	Relegation to Liga V Botoșani
14	Nord Star Pomârla (R)	26	6	1	19	24	75	−51	19 (Note: Nord Star Pomârla was excluded from the championship after 15 rounds and lost all the remaining matches with 0–3.)	Relegation to Liga V Botoșani

Rules for classification: 1) Points; 2) Head-to-head points; 3) Head-to-head goal difference; 4) Head-to-head goals scored; 5) Head-to-head away goals scored; 6) Goal difference; 7) Goals scored.
(C) Champions; (Q) Qualified for the phase indicated; (R) Relegated

=== Brașov County ===
Pos	Team	Pld	W	D	L	GF	GA	GD	Pts	Qualification or relegation
1	Făgăraș (C, Q)	34	29	4	1	142	15	+127	91	Qualification to promotion play-off
2	Zărnești	34	21	6	7	85	37	+48	69	
3	Înfrățirea Agromec Hărman	34	20	8	6	89	28	+61	68	
4	Inter Cristian	34	19	6	9	90	44	+46	63	
5	CFR Brașov	34	18	6	10	67	39	+28	60	
6	Râșnov	34	18	5	11	76	46	+30	59	
7	Viitorul Ghimbav	34	17	8	9	77	43	+34	59	
8	Unirea Tărlungeni II	34	17	7	10	79	46	+33	58	
9	Aripile Brașov	34	18	3	13	65	51	+14	57	
10	Viromet Victoria	34	14	3	17	69	86	−17	45	
11	Cetatea Rupea-Homorod	34	14	1	19	62	69	−7	43	
12	Olimpic Voila	34	13	4	17	54	82	−28	43	
13	Ghimbav 2000	34	12	5	17	73	93	−20	41	
14	Energia Unirea Feldioara	34	10	6	18	54	64	−10	36	
15	Jibert	34	9	6	19	49	78	−29	33	
16	Olimpia Sânpetru (R)	34	9	3	22	49	148	−99	30	Relegation to Liga V Brașov
17	Carpați Berivoi (R)	34	5	4	25	50	126	−76	19	Relegation to Liga V Brașov
18	Izvorul Hoghiz (R)	34	0	1	33	17	152	−135	1	Relegation to Liga V Brașov

Rules for classification: 1) Points; 2) Head-to-head points; 3) Head-to-head goal difference; 4) Head-to-head goals scored; 5) Head-to-head away goals scored; 6) Goal difference; 7) Goals scored.
(C) Champions; (Q) Qualified for the phase indicated; (R) Relegated

=== Brăila County ===
Pos	Team	Pld	W	D	L	GF	GA	GD	Pts	Qualification or relegation
1	Victoria Traian (C, Q)	26	23	1	2	83	27	+56	70 (Note: Victoria Traian–Fortino Ianca 1–0; Fortino Ianca –Victoria Traian 0–1.)	Qualification to promotion play-off
2	Fortino Ianca	26	23	1	2	105	15	+90	70	
3	Tufești	26	19	2	5	101	25	+76	59	
4	Dunărea Gropeni	26	17	2	7	90	43	+47	53	
5	Sportul Chiscani	26	13	3	10	66	58	+8	42	
6	Victoria Cazasu	26	13	2	11	62	56	+6	41	
7	Voința Vișani	26	12	3	11	63	54	+9	39	
8	Siretul Vădeni	26	12	1	13	53	60	−7	37	
9	Viitorul Galbenu	26	9	5	12	66	89	−23	32	
10	Voința Șuțești	26	9	0	17	46	65	−19	27 (Note: Voința Șuțești–Făurei 3–0; Făurei –Voința Șuțești 2–3.)	
11	Făurei	26	9	0	17	40	60	−20	27	
12	Voința Surdila-Găiseanca	26	3	7	16	22	60	−38	16	
13	Avântul Mircea Vodă (R)	26	4	2	20	27	107	−80	14 (Note: Avântul Mircea Vodă withdrew from the championship after 22 rounds and lost all the remaining matches with 0–3.)	Relegation to Liga V Brăila
14	Victoria Dedulești (R)	26	1	1	24	28	133	−105	4	Relegation to Liga V Brăila

Rules for classification: 1) Points; 2) Head-to-head points; 3) Head-to-head goal difference; 4) Head-to-head goals scored; 5) Head-to-head away goals scored; 6) Goal difference; 7) Goals scored.
(C) Champions; (Q) Qualified for the phase indicated; (R) Relegated

=== Bucharest ===
==== Regular season ====
===== Seria 1 =====
Pos	Team	Pld	W	D	L	GF	GA	GD	Pts	Qualification or relegation
1	Termo București	28	25	2	1	122	18	+104	77	Qualification to championship play-off
2	Chitila	28	22	5	1	111	17	+94	71	Qualification to championship play-off
3	Viitorul Jilava	28	19	3	6	97	46	+51	60	Qualification to championship play-off
4	Dinamo București III	28	18	5	5	82	40	+42	59	Qualification to championship play-off
5	Unirea Tricolor București	28	16	6	6	90	39	+51	54	
6	Voința București	28	14	4	10	81	51	+30	46	
7	Inter Clinceni II	28	11	4	13	82	62	+20	37	
8	Aversa București	28	11	1	16	71	92	−21	34	
9	Sportul Studențesc București III	28	9	5	14	61	77	−16	32	
10	Pantelimon	28	9	3	16	50	88	−38	30	
11	Progresul București	28	9	1	18	55	71	−16	28	
12	Calcio București	28	7	3	18	34	66	−32	24 (Note: Calcio București withdrew in the second part of the season and lost all remaining matches with 0–3.)	
13	Marius Lăcătuș București	28	6	2	20	53	122	−69	20	
14	Juniorul București	28	4	5	19	43	114	−71	17	
15	Electroaparataj București	28	5	1	22	35	152	−117	16	

Rules for classification: 1) Points; 2) Head-to-head points; 3) Head-to-head goal difference; 4) Head-to-head goals scored; 5) Head-to-head away goals scored; 6) Goal difference; 7) Goals scored.

===== Seria 2 =====
Pos	Team	Pld	W	D	L	GF	GA	GD	Pts	Qualification or relegation
1	Romprim București	30	21	4	5	97	43	+54	67	Qualification to championship play-off
2	1 Decembrie	30	21	1	8	95	49	+46	64 (Note: 1 Decembrie withdrew before the start of the play-offs.)	
3	Electroaparataj București II	30	20	3	7	84	41	+43	63	Qualification to championship play-off
4	Săbărelul Ciocoveni	30	19	4	7	69	37	+32	61	Qualification to championship play-off
5	Viitorul București	30	19	2	9	83	50	+33	59	Qualification to championship play-off
6	Termo București II	30	18	5	7	88	52	+36	59	
7	Ilie Oană București	30	18	3	9	68	50	+18	57	
8	Electrica București	30	16	5	9	70	58	+12	53	
9	Coresi București	30	17	1	12	71	73	−2	52	
10	Metaloglobus București II	30	13	2	15	83	67	+16	41	
11	Nida Popești-Leordeni	30	13	2	15	62	62	0	41	
12	LPS Mircea Eliade București	30	10	1	19	63	80	−17	31	
13	Inter Voluntari	30	10	0	20	54	76	−22	30	
14	Spic de Grâu București	30	5	1	24	38	100	−62	16	
15	Frăția București	30	1	2	27	27	115	−88	5	
16	CSAT Mircea Eliade București	30	0	0	30	15	117	−102	0 (Note: CSAT Mircea Eliade withdrew in the second part of the season and lost all remaining matches with 0–3.)	

Rules for classification: 1) Points; 2) Head-to-head points; 3) Head-to-head goal difference; 4) Head-to-head goals scored; 5) Head-to-head away goals scored; 6) Goal difference; 7) Goals scored.

==== Championship play-off ====
===== Group 1 =====
All matches were played at Rocar Stadium in Bucharest on 24, 27 and 29 May 2013.

Pos	Team	Pld	W	D	L	GF	GA	GD	Pts	Qualification	DIN	CHI	EL2	SCI
1	Dinamo București III (Q)	3	3	0	0	15	3	+12	9	Qualification to semi-finals		4–2		
2	Chitila (Q)	3	2	0	1	18	5	+13	6	Qualification to semi-finals				6–1
3	Electroaparataj București II	3	1	0	2	3	19	−16	3		0–8	0–10		
4	Săbărelul Ciocoveni	3	0	0	3	3	12	−9	0		1–3		1–3	

Rules for classification: 1) Points; 2) Head-to-head points; 3) Head-to-head goal difference; 4) Head-to-head goals scored; 5) Head-to-head away goals scored; 6) Goal difference; 7) Goals scored.
(Q) Qualified for the phase indicated

===== Group 2 =====
All matches were played at Romprim Stadium in Bucharest on 23, 25 and 28 May 2013.

Pos	Team	Pld	W	D	L	GF	GA	GD	Pts	Qualification	ROM	TER	VJI	VBU
1	Romprim București (Q)	3	3	0	0	11	6	+5	9	Qualification to semi-finals		2–1		
2	Termo București (Q)	3	2	0	1	13	3	+10	6	Qualification to semi-finals			8–1	4–0
3	Viitorul Jilava	3	1	0	2	7	13	−6	3		3–4			3–1
4	Viitorul București	3	0	0	3	3	12	−9	0		2–5			

Rules for classification: 1) Points; 2) Head-to-head points; 3) Head-to-head goal difference; 4) Head-to-head goals scored; 5) Head-to-head away goals scored; 6) Goal difference; 7) Goals scored.
(Q) Qualified for the phase indicated

===== Semi-finals =====
Team 1	Score	Team 2
Dinamo București III	1–2	Termo București
Chitila	1–0	Romprim București

===== Final =====
Team 1	Score	Team 2
Chitila	1–0	Termo București

Chitila won the 2011–12 Liga IV Bucharest and qualify to promotion play-off in Liga III.

=== Buzău County ===
==== Series I ====
Pos	Team	Pld	W	D	L	GF	GA	GD	Pts	Qualification or relegation
1	Recolta Cislău (Q)	22	15	3	4	57	20	+37	48	Qualification to championship play-off
2	Viitorul 08 Vernești (Q)	22	15	2	5	60	33	+27	47	Qualification to championship play-off
3	Unirea Mărăcineni	22	13	1	8	54	28	+26	40	
4	Montana Pătârlagele	22	13	1	8	50	29	+21	40	
5	Șoimii Siriu	22	12	3	7	45	40	+5	39	
6	Progresul Beceni	22	11	5	6	42	32	+10	38	
7	Foresta Nehoiu	22	12	0	10	40	32	+8	36	
8	Petrolul Berca	22	11	2	9	39	39	0	35	
9	Viitorul Tisău	22	7	5	10	52	40	+12	26	
10	Avântul Chiojdu	22	7	3	12	34	47	−13	24	
11	Partizanul Merei	22	2	0	20	26	97	−71	6	
12	Inter Cănești	22	1	1	20	9	71	−62	4	

Rules for classification: 1) Points; 2) Head-to-head points; 3) Head-to-head goal difference; 4) Head-to-head goals scored; 5) Head-to-head away goals scored; 6) Goal difference; 7) Goals scored.
(Q) Qualified for the phase indicated

==== Series II ====
Pos	Team	Pld	W	D	L	GF	GA	GD	Pts	Qualification or relegation
1	Pescărușul Luciu (Q)	24	21	1	2	79	27	+52	64	Qualification to championship play-off
2	Unirea Stâlpu (Q)	23	17	2	4	59	28	+31	53	Qualification to championship play-off
3	Olimpia Pogoanele	24	15	4	5	67	41	+26	49	
4	Locomotiva LPS Buzău	24	14	6	4	66	40	+26	48	
5	Steaua Săhăteni	23	13	6	4	61	34	+27	45	
6	Progresul Movila Banului	23	11	5	7	56	36	+20	38	
7	Voința Căldărăști	24	10	3	11	57	44	+13	33	
8	Voința Limpeziș	24	7	4	13	57	54	+3	25	
9	Șoimii Costești	23	7	3	13	34	65	−31	24	
10	Tricolorul Gălbinași	24	6	1	17	37	60	−23	19	
11	Luceafărul Maxenu	24	5	1	18	27	75	−48	16	
12	Voința Florica	24	4	2	18	27	62	−35	14	
13	Cereanim Smeeni	24	4	2	18	34	95	−61	14	

Rules for classification: 1) Points; 2) Head-to-head points; 3) Head-to-head goal difference; 4) Head-to-head goals scored; 5) Head-to-head away goals scored; 6) Goal difference; 7) Goals scored.
(Q) Qualified for the phase indicated

==== Series III ====
Pos	Team	Pld	W	D	L	GF	GA	GD	Pts	Qualification or relegation
1	Puiești (Q)	22	20	1	1	81	20	+61	61	Qualification to championship play-off
2	Voința Lanurile (Q)	22	17	3	2	75	14	+61	54	Qualification to championship play-off
3	Spartac Poșta Câlnău	22	16	1	5	91	32	+59	49	
4	Victoria Buda	22	13	2	7	53	36	+17	41	
5	Recolta Boldu	22	13	1	8	57	43	+14	40	
6	Gloria Vadu Pașii	22	11	5	6	45	41	+4	38	
7	Victoria Boboc	22	9	1	12	50	50	0	28	
8	Metalul Buzău	22	8	2	12	59	62	−3	26	
9	Înfrățirea Zoița	22	5	3	14	28	54	−26	18	
10	Avântul Zărnești	22	4	3	15	29	87	−58	15	
11	Valconf Valea Râmnicului	22	4	2	16	19	71	−52	14	
12	Com Săgeata	22	0	0	22	3	80	−77	0	

Rules for classification: 1) Points; 2) Head-to-head points; 3) Head-to-head goal difference; 4) Head-to-head goals scored; 5) Head-to-head away goals scored; 6) Goal difference; 7) Goals scored.
(Q) Qualified for the phase indicated

==== Championship play-off ====
Pos	Team	Pld	W	D	L	GF	GA	GD	Pts	Qualification
1	Unirea Stâlpu (Q, C)	4	1	0	3	5	11	−6	3 (Note: Unirea Stâlpu was declared champion after two matches from the last round of the championship play-off, Puiești - Recolta Cislău 36–2 and Voința Lanuri - Pescărușul Luciu 33–1, were considered arranged by AJF Buzău. The four teams involved were disqualified and were penalised with 6 points for next season.)	Qualification to promotion play-off
2	Viitorul 08 Vernești	4	1	0	3	2	11	−9	3	
3	Voința Lanurile (D)	4	2	2	0	13	4	+9	8	Disqualified
4	Puiești (D)	4	2	2	0	8	4	+4	8	Disqualified
5	Pescărușul Luciu (D)	4	2	1	1	11	7	+4	7	Disqualified
6	Recolta Cislău (D)	4	1	1	2	5	7	−2	4	Disqualified

Rules for classification: 1) Points; 2) Head-to-head points; 3) Head-to-head goal difference; 4) Head-to-head goals scored; 5) Head-to-head away goals scored; 6) Goal difference; 7) Goals scored.
(C) Champions; (D) Disqualified; (Q) Qualified for the phase indicated

=== Călărași County ===
==== Seria A ====
Pos	Team	Pld	W	D	L	GF	GA	GD	Pts	Qualification or relegation
1	Victoria Chirnogi II (Q)	30	26	2	2	136	31	+105	80	Qualification to play-off semifinals
2	Viitorul Sohatu (Q)	30	24	2	4	135	48	+87	74	Qualification to play-off round
3	Unirea Podul Pitarului	30	20	4	6	77	36	+41	64	
4	Viitorul Plătărești	30	18	2	10	96	57	+39	56	
5	Rapid Ulmeni	30	18	2	10	94	71	+23	56	
6	Vulturii Oltenița (Q)	30	17	4	9	90	54	+36	55	Qualification to relegation play-out
7	Viitorul Șoldanu (R)	30	14	6	10	72	60	+12	48	Relegation to Liga V Călărași
8	Steaua Radovanu (R)	30	14	2	14	74	69	+5	44	Relegation to Liga V Călărași
9	Unirea Spanțov (R)	30	12	2	16	86	95	−9	38	Relegation to Liga V Călărași
10	Avântul Luica	30	11	4	15	63	77	−14	37	Relegation to Liga V Călărași
11	Budești (R)	30	10	3	17	61	115	−54	33	Relegation to Liga V Călărași
12	Curcani (R)	30	8	5	17	58	84	−26	29	Relegation to Liga V Călărași
13	Lumina Frumușani (R)	30	8	2	20	55	118	−63	26	Relegation to Liga V Călărași
14	Rapid Vasilați (R)	30	6	2	22	67	118	−51	20	Relegation to Liga V Călărași
15	Partizanul Crivăț (R)	30	4	6	20	35	99	−64	18	Relegation to Liga V Călărași
16	Viitorul Mitreni (R)	30	6	0	24	46	113	−67	18	Relegation to Liga V Călărași

Rules for classification: 1) Points; 2) Head-to-head points; 3) Head-to-head goal difference; 4) Head-to-head goals scored; 5) Head-to-head away goals scored; 6) Goal difference; 7) Goals scored.
(Q) Qualified for the phase indicated; (R) Relegated

==== Seria B ====
Pos	Team	Pld	W	D	L	GF	GA	GD	Pts	Qualification or relegation
1	Progresul Fundulea (Q)	24	21	2	1	68	19	+49	65	Qualification to play-off semifinals
2	Viitorul Dâlga (Q)	24	19	2	3	83	22	+61	59	Qualification to play-off round
3	Victoria Lehliu	24	17	4	3	78	25	+53	55	
4	Unirea Mănăstirea	24	12	6	6	68	35	+33	42	
5	Dinamo Sărulești	24	13	2	9	65	43	+22	41	
6	Avântul Dor Mărunt (Q)	24	10	6	8	28	38	−10	36	Qualification to relegation play-out
7	Fortuna Tămădău (R)	24	9	4	11	33	46	−13	31	Relegation to Liga V Călărași
8	Petrolul Ileana (R)	24	9	2	13	45	53	−8	29	Relegation to Liga V Călărași
9	Steaua Lupșanu (R)	24	5	8	11	24	40	−16	23	Relegation to Liga V Călărași
10	Speranța Plumbuita 2006 (R)	24	7	1	16	47	62	−15	22	Relegation to Liga V Călărași
11	Libertatea Belciugatele (R)	24	5	3	16	35	64	−29	18	Relegation to Liga V Călărași
12	Rapid Răzvani (R)	24	3	3	18	35	80	−45	12	Relegation to Liga V Călărași
13	Speranța Plumbuita (R)	24	3	3	18	24	106	−82	12	Relegation to Liga V Călărași
14	Phoenix Ulmu II (D)	0	0	0	0	0	0	0	0 (Note: Phoenix Ulmu II withdrew from the championship during the first half and all its results were canceled.)	Withdrew

Rules for classification: 1) Points; 2) Head-to-head points; 3) Head-to-head goal difference; 4) Head-to-head goals scored; 5) Head-to-head away goals scored; 6) Goal difference; 7) Goals scored.
(D) Disqualified; (Q) Qualified for the phase indicated; (R) Relegated

==== Seria C ====
Pos	Team	Pld	W	D	L	GF	GA	GD	Pts	Qualification or relegation
1	Venus Independența (Q)	28	25	2	1	122	12	+110	77	Qualification to play-off semifinals
2	Înainte Modelu (Q)	28	22	2	4	87	27	+60	68	Qualification to play-off round
3	Dunărea Ciocănești	28	19	7	2	102	16	+86	64	
4	Agricola Borcea	28	17	4	7	78	36	+42	55	
5	Victoria Dragoș Vodă	28	16	2	10	78	49	+29	50	
6	Șoimii Unirea (Q)	28	14	6	8	52	38	+14	48	Qualification to relegation play-out
7	Spicul Roseți (R)	28	14	2	12	75	48	+27	44	Relegation to Liga V Călărași
8	Dunărea Grădiștea (R)	28	12	8	8	50	27	+23	44	Relegation to Liga V Călărași
9	Unirea Dragalina (R)	28	13	1	14	49	74	−25	40	Relegation to Liga V Călărași
10	Zarea Cuza Vodă (R)	28	11	4	13	56	49	+7	37	Relegation to Liga V Călărași
11	Avântul Pietroiu (R)	28	8	1	19	35	68	−33	25	Relegation to Liga V Călărași
12	Tricolorul Jegălia (R)	28	7	2	19	47	105	−58	23	Relegation to Liga V Călărași
13	Conpet Ștefan cel Mare (R)	28	4	2	22	39	112	−73	14	Relegation to Liga V Călărași
14	Victoria Potcoava (R)	28	3	3	22	43	123	−80	12	Relegation to Liga V Călărași
15	Atletic Dorobanțu (R)	28	1	2	25	30	159	−129	5	Relegation to Liga V Călărași

Rules for classification: 1) Points; 2) Head-to-head points; 3) Head-to-head goal difference; 4) Head-to-head goals scored; 5) Head-to-head away goals scored; 6) Goal difference; 7) Goals scored.
(Q) Qualified for the phase indicated; (R) Relegated

==== Relegation play-out ====
Pos	Team	Pld	W	D	L	GF	GA	GD	Pts	Relegation
1	Avântul Dor Mărunt	2	2	0	0	4	2	+2	6	
2	Șoimii Unirea (Note: Șoimii Unirea was spared from relegation due to the promotion of Venus Independența in Liga III.)	2	1	0	1	5	4	+1	3	Spared from relegation
3	Vulturii Oltenița (R)	2	0	0	2	3	6	−3	0	Relegation to Liga V Călărași

Rules for classification: 1) Points; 2) Head-to-head points; 3) Head-to-head goal difference; 4) Head-to-head goals scored; 5) Head-to-head away goals scored; 6) Goal difference; 7) Goals scored.
(R) Relegated

==== Championship play-off ====
===== Play-off round =====
Pos	Team	Pld	W	D	L	GF	GA	GD	Pts	Qualification
1	Înainte Modelu (Q)	2	2	0	0	5	3	+2	6	Qualification to play-off semifinals
2	Viitorul Sohatu	2	1	0	1	5	2	+3	3	
3	Viitorul Dâlga	2	0	0	2	4	9	−5	0	

Rules for classification: 1) Points; 2) Head-to-head points; 3) Head-to-head goal difference; 4) Head-to-head goals scored; 5) Head-to-head away goals scored; 6) Goal difference; 7) Goals scored.
(Q) Qualified for the phase indicated

===== Semifinals =====
Team 1	Agg.	Team 2	1st leg	2nd leg
Progresul Fundulea	6–3	Înainte Modelu	3–1	3–2
Victoria Chirnogi II	1–5	Venus Independența	1–1	0–4

===== Final =====
The championship final was played on 16 June 2012 at Ion Comșa Stadium in Călărași.

Team 1	Score	Team 2
Venus Independența	6–0	Progresul Fundulea

Venus Independența won the 2011–12 Liga IV Călărași County and qualify to promotion play-off in Liga III.

=== Caraș-Severin County ===
Pos	Team	Pld	W	D	L	GF	GA	GD	Pts	Qualification or relegation
1	Muncitorul Reșița (C, Q)	30	27	2	1	130	19	+111	83	Qualification to promotion play-off
2	Voința Lupac	30	25	1	4	110	26	+84	76	
3	Bistra Glimboca	30	19	5	6	71	38	+33	62	
4	Metalul Bocșa	30	18	1	11	64	46	+18	55	
5	Berzasca	30	16	5	9	71	44	+27	53	
6	Nera Bozovici	30	16	3	11	54	50	+4	51	
7	Metalul Oțelu Roșu	30	16	0	14	67	59	+8	48	
8	Oravița	30	14	4	12	76	69	+7	46	
9	Minerul Anina	30	14	4	12	68	61	+7	46	
10	Moldo-Forest Moldova Nouă	30	11	5	14	55	51	+4	38	
11	Semenicul Văliug	30	11	1	18	46	76	−30	34	
12	Timișul Slatina-Timiș	30	9	2	19	48	86	−38	29	
13	Prolaz Karaševo	30	8	4	18	54	82	−28	28	
14	Hercules Băile Herculane	30	8	1	21	49	102	−53	25	
15	Minerul Dognecea (R)	30	7	1	22	57	127	−70	22	Qualification to relegation play-off
16	Starigrad Karaševo 1299 (R)	30	1	1	28	9	93	−84	4 (Note: Starigrad Karaševo 1299 withdrew from the championship and lost all the matches from the second part of the season with 0-3.)	Relegation to Liga V Caraș-Severin

Rules for classification: 1) Points; 2) Head-to-head points; 3) Head-to-head goal difference; 4) Head-to-head goals scored; 5) Head-to-head away goals scored; 6) Goal difference; 7) Goals scored.
(C) Champions; (Q) Qualified for the phase indicated; (R) Relegated

==== Relegation play-off ====
Pos	Team	Pld	W	D	L	GF	GA	GD	Pts	Promotion
1	Voința Răcășdia (P)	2	2	0	0	4	2	+2	6	Promotion to 2012–13 Liga IV
2	Hidrocon Marga	2	1	0	1	4	1	+3	3	
3	Minerul Dognecea	2	0	0	2	2	7	−5	0	

Rules for classification: 1) Points; 2) Head-to-head points; 3) Head-to-head goal difference; 4) Head-to-head goals scored; 5) Head-to-head away goals scored; 6) Goal difference; 7) Goals scored.
(P) Promoted

=== Cluj County ===
Pos	Team	Pld	W	D	L	GF	GA	GD	Pts	Qualification or relegation (Note: Teams are split into two groups (Play-off and Play-out) after each have played 18 matches.)
1	Vulturii Vultureni (C, Q)	24	19	4	1	86	23	+63	61	Qualification to promotion play-off
2	Arieșul Mihai Viteazu	24	16	1	7	68	29	+39	49	
3	Atletic Olimpia Gherla	24	14	1	9	60	34	+26	43	
4	Viitorul Gârbău	24	12	3	9	62	38	+24	39	
5	Unirea Jucu	23	14	3	6	89	28	+61	45	
6	Vulturul Mintiu Gherlii	23	11	4	8	68	35	+33	37	
7	Someșul Gilău	23	11	1	11	32	43	−11	34	
8	Unirea Tritenii de Jos	23	5	1	17	38	86	−48	16	
9	Aghireșu	23	3	1	19	31	155	−124	10	
10	CFR Dej	23	2	1	20	27	89	−62	7	

Rules for classification: 1) Points; 2) Head-to-head points; 3) Head-to-head goal difference; 4) Head-to-head goals scored; 5) Head-to-head away goals scored; 6) Goal difference; 7) Goals scored.
(C) Champions; (Q) Qualified for the phase indicated

=== Constanța County ===
==== East Series ====
Pos	Team	Pld	W	D	L	GF	GA	GD	Pts	Qualification
1	Agigea	20	18	0	2	96	17	+79	54	Qualification to championship play-off
2	Viteazu Sinoe Mihai Viteazu	20	13	3	4	54	24	+30	42	Qualification to championship play-off
3	Portul Constanța	20	11	6	3	44	21	+23	39	Qualification to championship play-off
4	Ovidiu	20	12	2	6	89	41	+48	38	Qualification to championship play-off
5	Sparta Techirghiol	20	11	3	6	55	31	+24	36	Qualification to championship play-off
6	Aurora 23 August	20	8	5	7	38	52	−14	29	Qualification to championship play-off
7	GSIB Mangalia	20	8	4	8	44	39	+5	28	Qualification to championship play-out
8	Victoria Cumpăna	20	7	1	12	28	63	−35	22	Qualification to championship play-out
9	Cariocas Constanța (D, R)	20	4	0	16	32	54	−22	12 (Note: Cariocas Constanța withdrew from the championship after 18 rounds and lost all the remaining matches with 0–3.)	Withdrew
10	Cogealac	20	3	2	15	19	80	−61	11	Qualification to championship play-out
11	Viitorul Pecineaga	20	2	0	18	13	90	−77	6	Qualification to championship play-out
12	Gloria Albești (D, R)	0	0	0	0	0	0	0	0 (Note: Gloria Albești withdrew from the championship and all its result were canceled.)	Withdrew

Rules for classification: 1) Points; 2) Head-to-head points; 3) Head-to-head goal difference; 4) Head-to-head goals scored; 5) Head-to-head away goals scored; 6) Goal difference; 7) Goals scored.
(D) Disqualified; (R) Relegated

==== West Series ====
Pos	Team	Pld	W	D	L	GF	GA	GD	Pts	Qualification
1	Peștera (D, R)	22	15	3	4	54	23	+31	48 (Note: Peștera withdrew from the championship after 18 rounds and lost all the remaining matches with 0–3.)	Withdrew
2	Perla Murfatlar	22	12	5	5	51	34	+17	41	Qualification to championship play-off
3	Mihail Kogălniceanu	22	10	4	8	57	51	+6	34	Qualification to championship play-off
4	Gloria Băneasa	22	10	4	8	46	41	+5	34	Qualification to championship play-off
5	Cernavodă	22	10	3	9	38	31	+7	33	Qualification to championship play-off
6	Vulturii Cazino Constanța	22	10	2	10	47	41	+6	32	Qualification to championship play-off
7	Sport Prim Oltina	22	9	5	8	46	52	−6	32	Qualification to championship play-off
8	Carvăn Lipnița	22	8	4	10	48	50	−2	28	Qualification to championship play-out
9	Steaua Speranței Siliștea	22	5	9	8	27	40	−13	24	Qualification to championship play-out
10	Carsium Hârșova	22	6	6	10	30	46	−16	24	Qualification to championship play-out
11	Dacia Mircea Vodă	22	6	6	10	33	50	−17	24	Qualification to championship play-out
12	Știința ACALAB Poarta Albă	22	3	5	14	36	54	−18	14	Qualification to championship play-out

Rules for classification: 1) Points; 2) Head-to-head points; 3) Head-to-head goal difference; 4) Head-to-head goals scored; 5) Head-to-head away goals scored; 6) Goal difference; 7) Goals scored.
(D) Disqualified; (R) Relegated

==== Championship play-off ====
The teams started the play-off with all the records achieved in the regular season, but without the results with the withdrawn teams Gloria Albești and Peștera. The teams played only against the teams from the other series

Pos	Team	Pld	W	D	L	GF	GA	GD	Pts	Qualification
1	Agigea (C, Q)	31	28	1	2	134	28	+106	85	Qualification to promotion play-off
2	Gloria Băneasa	32	18	5	9	76	56	+20	59	
3	Ovidiu	32	18	4	10	117	61	+56	58	
4	Viteazu Sinoe Mihai Viteazu	32	17	6	9	77	47	+30	57	
5	Mihail Kogălniceanu	32	16	6	10	85	61	+24	54	
6	Perla Murfatlar	31	16	6	9	78	64	+14	54	
7	Portul Constanța	32	15	8	9	66	48	+18	53	
8	Sparta Techirghiol	32	16	4	12	81	67	+14	52	
9	Sport Prim Oltina	32	13	8	11	71	69	+2	47	
10	Aurora 23 August	32	11	8	13	58	87	−29	41	
11	Cernavodă	32	11	7	14	53	58	−5	40	
12	Vulturii Cazino Constanța	32	12	3	17	63	70	−7	39	

Rules for classification: 1) Points; 2) Head-to-head points; 3) Head-to-head goal difference; 4) Head-to-head goals scored; 5) Head-to-head away goals scored; 6) Goal difference; 7) Goals scored.
(C) Champions; (Q) Qualified for the phase indicated

==== Championship play-out ====
The teams started the play-out with all the records achieved in the regular season and played only against the teams from the other series.

Pos	Team	Pld	W	D	L	GF	GA	GD	Pts
13	Steaua Speranței Siliștea	30	11	10	9	62	49	+13	43
14	Carsium Hârșova	30	11	6	13	56	64	−8	39
15	Carvăn Lipnița	30	11	8	11	63	62	+1	41
16	GSIB Mangalia	30	11	6	13	62	59	+3	39
17	Dacia Mircea Vodă	30	10	7	13	56	67	−11	37
18	Știința ACALAB Poarta Albă	30	7	6	17	50	67	−17	27
19	Victoria Cumpăna	30	10	3	17	45	83	−38	33
20	Cogealac	30	4	3	23	27	134	−107	15
21	Viitorul Pecineaga	30	6	2	22	39	109	−70	20

Rules for classification: 1) Points; 2) Head-to-head points; 3) Head-to-head goal difference; 4) Head-to-head goals scored; 5) Head-to-head away goals scored; 6) Goal difference; 7) Goals scored.

=== Covasna County ===
Pos	Team	Pld	W	D	L	GF	GA	GD	Pts	Qualification or relegation
1	Zagon (C, Q)	30	26	3	1	138	20	+118	81	Qualification to promotion play-off
2	Prima Brăduț	30	21	4	5	72	33	+39	67	
3	Nemere Ghelința	30	19	2	9	89	37	+52	59	
4	Brețcu	30	17	2	11	70	37	+33	53	
5	Păpăuți	30	16	5	9	71	51	+20	53	
6	Ojdula	30	14	2	14	61	63	−2	44	
7	Perko Sânzieni	30	12	7	11	57	46	+11	43	
8	Stăruința Bodoc	30	14	0	16	71	67	+4	42	
9	Baraolt	30	12	5	13	49	57	−8	41	
10	Progresul Sita Buzăului	30	11	5	14	53	89	−36	38	
11	Avântul Ilieni	30	10	2	18	52	75	−23	32	
12	Cernat	30	9	5	16	42	76	−34	32	
13	Ciucașul Întorsura Buzăului	30	8	6	16	46	63	−17	30	
14	BSE Belin	30	9	3	18	49	83	−34	30	
15	Victoria Ozun (R)	30	8	4	18	33	68	−35	28	Relegation to Liga V Covasna
16	Oltul Coșeni (R)	30	5	3	22	35	118	−83	18	Relegation to Liga V Covasna

Rules for classification: 1) Points; 2) Head-to-head points; 3) Head-to-head goal difference; 4) Head-to-head goals scored; 5) Head-to-head away goals scored; 6) Goal difference; 7) Goals scored.
(C) Champions; (Q) Qualified for the phase indicated; (R) Relegated

=== Dâmbovița County ===
Pos	Team	Pld	W	D	L	GF	GA	GD	Pts	Qualification or relegation
1	Gloria Cornești (C, Q)	34	32	1	1	173	22	+151	97	Qualification to promotion play-off
2	Utchim Găești	34	23	2	9	121	43	+78	70 (Note: Utchim Găești deducted 1 point.)	
3	Doicești	34	22	3	9	99	37	+62	69	
4	PAS Pucioasa	34	19	4	11	81	47	+34	61	
5	Petrolul Tărgoviște	34	18	6	10	84	49	+35	60	
6	Bradul Moroieni	34	18	5	11	77	52	+25	59	
7	Recolta Gura Șuții	34	18	3	13	84	63	+21	57	
8	Aninoasa	34	16	7	11	76	68	+8	55	
9	Conțești	34	17	3	14	75	74	+1	54	
10	Avântul Produlești	34	15	6	13	65	82	−17	51	
11	Comerțul Viișoara	34	14	5	15	63	94	−31	47	
12	Voința Perșinari	34	14	4	16	86	76	+10	46	
13	Tisenmetal Colibași	34	13	6	15	53	63	−10	45	
14	Gaz Metan Finta	34	14	3	17	65	93	−28	45	
15	Luceafărul Dărmănești	34	11	4	19	51	79	−28	37	
16	Victoria Comișani (R)	34	6	1	27	65	179	−114	19	Relegation to Liga V Dâmbovița
17	Viitorul Șelaru (R)	34	3	1	30	34	122	−88	7 (Note: Viitorul Șelaru deducted 3 points.)	Relegation to Liga V Dâmbovița
18	Răcari (R)	34	2	1	31	18	120	−102	7 (Note: Răcari withdrew in the second part of the season and lost all remaining matches with 0–3.)	Relegation to Liga V Dâmbovița

Rules for classification: 1) Points; 2) Head-to-head points; 3) Head-to-head goal difference; 4) Head-to-head goals scored; 5) Head-to-head away goals scored; 6) Goal difference; 7) Goals scored.
(C) Champions; (Q) Qualified for the phase indicated; (R) Relegated

=== Dolj County ===
==== Regular season ====
Pos	Team	Pld	W	D	L	GF	GA	GD	Pts	Qualification or relegation
1	Apă Craiova (Q)	28	23	3	2	125	31	+94	72	Qualification to play-off
2	Podari (Q)	28	22	4	2	105	19	+86	70	Qualification to play-off
3	Ișalnița (Q)	28	18	3	7	73	37	+36	57	Qualification to play-off
4	Energia Craiova (Q)	27	16	3	8	71	46	+25	51	Qualification to play-off
5	Progresul Segarcea	28	14	4	10	83	59	+24	46	
6	Amaradia Melinești	28	13	5	10	60	65	−5	44	
7	Recolta Ostroveni	28	11	7	10	69	60	+9	40	
8	Victoria Celaru	28	10	7	11	38	43	−5	37	
9	Filiași	26	9	5	12	43	49	−6	32	
10	Brădești	27	8	8	11	39	54	−15	32	
11	Viitorul Cârcea	28	5	8	15	40	66	−26	23	
12	Dunărea Bechet	28	6	5	17	48	130	−82	23	
13	Știința Malu Mare	28	6	4	18	31	79	−48	22	
14	ȘF "Gică Popescu" Craiova	27	5	3	19	51	85	−34	18	
15	Avântul Pielești	28	3	7	18	36	91	−55	16	
16	Sopot (D)	0	0	0	0	0	0	0	0 (Note: Sopot withdrew in the first part of the season and all its results were canceled.)	Withdrew

Rules for classification: 1) Points; 2) Head-to-head points; 3) Head-to-head goal difference; 4) Head-to-head goals scored; 5) Head-to-head away goals scored; 6) Goal difference; 7) Goals scored.
(D) Disqualified; (Q) Qualified for the phase indicated

==== Championship play-off ====
The results between the qualified teams was maintained in the championship play-off.

Pos	Team	Pld	W	D	L	GF	GA	GD	Pts	Qualification
1	Apă Craiova (C, Q)	11	9	2	0	35	15	+20	29	Qualification for promotion play-off
2	Podari	11	7	1	3	31	18	+13	22	
3	Energia Craiova	11	2	1	8	19	37	−18	7	
4	Ișalnița	11	1	2	8	15	30	−15	5	

Rules for classification: 1) Points; 2) Head-to-head points; 3) Head-to-head goal difference; 4) Head-to-head goals scored; 5) Head-to-head away goals scored; 6) Goal difference; 7) Goals scored.
(C) Champions; (Q) Qualified for the phase indicated

=== Galați County ===
Pos	Team	Pld	W	D	L	GF	GA	GD	Pts	Qualification or relegation
1	Sporting Liești (C, Q)	26	20	5	1	100	29	+71	65	Qualification to promotion play-off
2	Bujorii Târgu Bujor	26	20	2	4	56	28	+28	62	
3	Fulgerul Smulți	26	17	1	8	60	39	+21	52	
4	Avântul Vânatori	26	15	2	9	53	33	+20	47	
5	Metalosport Galați	26	14	3	9	50	50	0	45	
6	CSȘ Tecuci	26	12	5	9	76	40	+36	41	
7	Unirea Braniștea	26	10	6	10	54	44	+10	36	
8	Avântul Matca	26	9	7	10	44	45	−1	34	
9	Viitorul Costache Negri	26	8	5	13	51	64	−13	29	
10	Unirea Hanu Conachi	26	8	4	14	41	70	−29	28	
11	Muncitorul Ghidigeni	26	6	5	15	43	59	−16	23	
12	Gloria Ivești	26	6	4	16	40	93	−53	22	
13	Victoria Independența	26	4	5	17	32	68	−36	17	
14	Juventus 2007 Toflea	26	4	4	18	32	70	−38	16	

Rules for classification: 1) Points; 2) Head-to-head points; 3) Head-to-head goal difference; 4) Head-to-head goals scored; 5) Head-to-head away goals scored; 6) Goal difference; 7) Goals scored.
(C) Champions; (Q) Qualified for the phase indicated

=== Giurgiu County ===
Pos	Team	Pld	W	D	L	GF	GA	GD	Pts	Qualification or relegation
1	Avântul Florești (Q)	34	28	3	3	165	40	+125	87	Qualification to championship play-off
2	Bolintin Malu Spart (Q)	34	27	2	5	132	48	+84	83	Qualification to championship play-off
3	Nova Force Giurgiu (Q)	34	24	6	4	115	25	+90	78	Qualification to championship play-off
4	Silver Inter Zorile (Q)	34	18	5	11	94	87	+7	59	Qualification to championship play-off
5	Victoria Adunații Copăceni	34	18	3	13	104	61	+43	57	
6	Dragonii Ogrezeni	34	18	2	14	95	72	+23	54 (Note: Dragonii Ogrezeni, Viitorul Vedea and Scărișoara deducted 2 points.)	
7	Viitorul Vedea	34	17	5	12	76	64	+12	54	
8	Spicul Izvoru	34	15	7	12	71	52	+19	52	
9	Zmeii Ogrezeni	34	14	5	15	109	105	+4	47	
10	Progresul Palanca	34	13	4	17	79	93	−14	43	
11	Scărișoara	34	14	2	18	90	95	−5	42	
12	Prundu	34	12	5	17	68	126	−58	41	
13	Dunărea Oinacu	34	12	4	18	65	99	−34	40	
14	Voința Slobozia	34	12	1	21	75	118	−43	37	
15	Crevedia Mare	34	10	6	18	58	79	−21	36	
16	Constructorul Bolintin-Deal	34	9	2	23	66	117	−51	29	
17	Victoria Falaștoaca	34	7	1	26	58	122	−64	22	
18	Constructorul Malu Spart	34	4	5	25	56	179	−123	17	

Rules for classification: 1) Points; 2) Head-to-head points; 3) Head-to-head goal difference; 4) Head-to-head goals scored; 5) Head-to-head away goals scored; 6) Goal difference; 7) Goals scored.
(Q) Qualified for the phase indicated

==== Championship play-off ====
The championship play-off played between the best four ranked team in the regular season. All matches were played at Bolintin-Vale Stadium on 6 and 7 June (semi-finals) and 13 June 2012 (final).

===== Semi-finals =====
Team 1	Score	Team 2
Avântul Florești	3–2	Nova Force Giurgiu
Bolintin Malu Spart	0–1	Silver Inter Zorile

===== Final =====
Team 1	Score	Team 2
Avântul Florești	7–0	Silver Inter Zorile

Avântul Florești won the 2011–12 Liga IV Giurgiu County and qualify to promotion play-off in Liga III.

=== Gorj County ===
Pos	Team	Pld	W	D	L	GF	GA	GD	Pts	Qualification or relegation
1	Petrofac Țicleni	34	31	2	1	132	26	+106	95	Qualification to promotion play-off
2	Știința Turceni	34	29	5	0	184	21	+163	92	
3	Minerul Mătăsari II	34	22	5	7	71	37	+34	71	
4	Vulturii Fărcășești	34	21	4	9	85	67	+18	67	
5	Unirea Crușeț	34	20	3	11	86	56	+30	63	
6	Internațional Bălești	34	17	6	11	60	38	+22	57	
7	Parângul Sadu	34	15	5	14	86	67	+19	50	
8	Energetica Tismana	34	15	5	14	72	64	+8	50	
9	Știința Drăguțești	34	15	2	17	65	71	−6	47	
10	Viitorul Negomir	34	14	4	16	70	68	+2	46	
11	Știința Peștișani	34	10	8	16	58	65	−7	38	
12	Flacăra Roșia de Amaradia	34	10	6	18	58	91	−33	36	
13	Știința Hurezeni	34	11	3	20	47	87	−40	36	
14	Inter Bâlteni	34	11	2	21	76	130	−54	35	
15	Petrolul Stoina	34	10	2	22	44	99	−55	32	
16	Dumbrava Câlnic	34	8	4	22	52	102	−50	28	
17	Știința Ceplea (R)	34	6	4	24	25	81	−56	22	Relegation to Liga V Gorj
18	Dinamo Stănești (R)	34	5	2	27	30	137	−107	17	Relegation to Liga V Gorj

Rules for classification: 1) Points; 2) Head-to-head points; 3) Head-to-head goal difference; 4) Head-to-head goals scored; 5) Head-to-head away goals scored; 6) Goal difference; 7) Goals scored.
(R) Relegated

=== Harghita County ===
Pos	Team	Pld	W	D	L	GF	GA	GD	Pts	Qualification or relegation
1	Miercurea Ciuc	18	16	1	1	65	9	+56	49	Qualification to championship play-off
2	Metalul Vlăhița	18	15	2	1	58	12	+46	47	Qualification to championship play-off
3	Ciceu	18	12	1	5	52	20	+32	37	Qualification to championship play-off
4	Știința Sărmaș Toplița	18	10	1	7	41	39	+2	31	Qualification to play-off
5	Străduința Mihăileni	18	9	2	7	30	31	−1	29	Qualification to play-off
6	Homorod Merești	18	6	0	12	34	62	−28	18	Qualification to play-off
7	Unirea Cristuru Secuiesc	18	5	2	11	27	33	−6	17	Qualification to play-off
8	Lunca de Sus	18	5	2	11	26	54	−28	17	Qualification to relegation play-off
9	Praid	18	5	0	13	22	40	−18	15	Qualification to relegation play-off
10	Roseal Odorheiu Secuiesc	18	1	1	16	15	70	−55	4	Qualification to relegation play-off

Rules for classification: 1) Points; 2) Head-to-head points; 3) Head-to-head goal difference; 4) Head-to-head goals scored; 5) Head-to-head away goals scored; 6) Goal difference; 7) Goals scored.

==== Championship play-off ====
Pos	Team	Pld	W	D	L	GF	GA	GD	Pts	Qualification
1	Miercurea Ciuc (C, Q)	22	19	1	2	75	13	+62	58	Qualification to promotion play-off
2	Metalul Vlăhița	22	16	2	4	64	23	+41	50	
3	Ciceu	22	14	1	7	61	30	+31	43	

Rules for classification: 1) Points; 2) Head-to-head points; 3) Head-to-head goal difference; 4) Head-to-head goals scored; 5) Head-to-head away goals scored; 6) Goal difference; 7) Goals scored.
(C) Champions; (Q) Qualified for the phase indicated

==== Play-off ====
Pos	Team	Pld	W	D	L	GF	GA	GD	Pts
4	Știința Sărmaș Toplița	24	14	1	9	57	51	+6	43
5	Unirea Cristuru Secuiesc	24	10	2	12	43	39	+4	32
6	Străduința Mihăileni	24	9	2	13	30	49	−19	29
7	Homorod Merești	24	9	0	15	50	74	−24	27

Rules for classification: 1) Points; 2) Head-to-head points; 3) Head-to-head goal difference; 4) Head-to-head goals scored; 5) Head-to-head away goals scored; 6) Goal difference; 7) Goals scored.

==== Relegation play-off ====
Pos	Team	Pld	W	D	L	GF	GA	GD	Pts	Relegation
8	Lunca de Sus	22	8	2	12	43	60	−17	26	
9	Praid	22	7	1	14	30	46	−16	22	
10	Roseal Odorheiu Secuiesc	22	1	2	19	19	87	−68	5	Relegation to Liga V Harghita

Rules for classification: 1) Points; 2) Head-to-head points; 3) Head-to-head goal difference; 4) Head-to-head goals scored; 5) Head-to-head away goals scored; 6) Goal difference; 7) Goals scored.

=== Hunedoara County ===
Pos	Team	Pld	W	D	L	GF	GA	GD	Pts	Qualification or relegation
1	Vulcan (C, Q)	32	27	2	3	94	19	+75	83	Qualification to promotion play-off
2	Aurul Brad	32	21	1	10	73	42	+31	64	
3	Jiul Petroșani II	32	18	5	9	74	37	+37	59	
4	Minerul Uricani	32	17	5	10	71	59	+12	56	
5	Retezatul Râul de Mori	32	16	6	10	58	42	+16	54	
6	Universitatea Petroșani	32	16	4	12	75	45	+30	52	
7	Minerul Aninoasa	32	15	7	10	60	42	+18	52	
8	Metalul Crișcior	32	16	4	12	68	41	+27	52	
9	Gloria Geoagiu	32	15	4	13	65	54	+11	49	
10	Șoimul Băița	32	14	3	15	55	57	−2	45	
11	Retezatul Hațeg	32	13	2	17	42	46	−4	41	
12	Dacia Orăștie	32	12	4	16	67	76	−9	40	
13	Aurul Certej	32	12	4	16	48	90	−42	40	
14	Inter Petrila	32	10	4	18	48	73	−25	34	
15	Zarandul Crișcior	32	9	4	19	33	73	−40	31	
16	Victoria Călan	32	5	3	24	37	102	−65	18	
17	Minerul Teliuc	32	4	2	26	25	95	−70	8 (Note: Minerul Teliuc deducted 6 points.)	

Rules for classification: 1) Points; 2) Head-to-head points; 3) Head-to-head goal difference; 4) Head-to-head goals scored; 5) Head-to-head away goals scored; 6) Goal difference; 7) Goals scored.
(C) Champions; (Q) Qualified for the phase indicated

=== Ialomița County ===
Pos	Team	Pld	W	D	L	GF	GA	GD	Pts	Qualification or relegation
1	Rapid Fetești (C, Q)	26	20	2	4	108	27	+81	62	Qualification to promotion play-off
2	Viticola Fetești	26	18	5	3	69	38	+31	59	
3	Recolta Gheorghe Lazăr	26	16	4	6	83	38	+45	52	
4	Victoria Amara	26	16	4	6	84	48	+36	52	
5	Victoria Țăndărei	26	16	3	7	56	29	+27	51	
6	Abatorul Slobozia	26	14	3	9	81	55	+26	45	
7	Victoria Munteni-Buzău	26	9	6	11	41	47	−6	33	
8	Recolta Gheorghe Doja	26	10	3	13	54	72	−18	33	
9	Voința Reviga	26	10	2	14	56	85	−29	32	
10	Olimpia Brazii	26	8	3	15	71	82	−11	27	
11	Spicul Colilia	26	7	1	18	29	80	−51	22	
12	Unirea Grivița	26	5	6	15	46	64	−18	21	
13	Juventus Borănești (R)	26	6	1	19	39	95	−56	19	Relegation to Liga V Ialomița
14	Andrias Andrășești (R)	26	3	5	18	31	86	−55	14	Relegation to Liga V Ialomița

Rules for classification: 1) Points; 2) Head-to-head points; 3) Head-to-head goal difference; 4) Head-to-head goals scored; 5) Head-to-head away goals scored; 6) Goal difference; 7) Goals scored.
(C) Champions; (Q) Qualified for the phase indicated; (R) Relegated

=== Iași County ===
Pos	Team	Pld	W	D	L	GF	GA	GD	Pts	Qualification or relegation
1	Rapid Dumești (C)	34	30	2	2	139	24	+115	92	Ineligible for promotion
2	Știința Miroslava (Q)	34	27	6	1	119	29	+90	87	Qualification to promotion play-off
3	Viitorul Târgu Frumos	34	26	4	4	100	33	+67	82	
4	Astra Răducăneni	34	20	6	8	95	56	+39	66	
5	Viitorul Hârlău	34	19	6	9	88	48	+40	63	
6	Stejarul Sinești	34	17	6	11	93	65	+28	57	
7	Viitorul Lungani	34	18	2	14	61	61	0	56	
8	Biruința Miroslovești	34	15	4	15	71	75	−4	49	
9	Unirea Mircești	34	13	8	13	71	66	+5	47	
10	CSȘ Pașcani	34	12	6	16	55	67	−12	42	
11	Magna Holboca	34	13	1	20	50	99	−49	40	
12	Unirea Ruginoasa	34	10	8	16	58	71	−13	38	
13	Foresta Ciurea	34	11	3	20	61	94	−33	36	
14	Gloria Bălțați	34	10	4	20	55	75	−20	34	
15	Gloria Balș (R)	34	10	2	22	52	87	−35	32	Relegation to Liga V Iași
16	Viitorul Ciortești (R)	34	6	8	20	47	80	−33	26	Relegation to Liga V Iași
17	Viitorul Belcești (R)	34	5	3	26	52	126	−74	18	Relegation to Liga V Iași
18	Helios Tomești (R)	34	4	1	29	36	147	−111	13	Relegation to Liga V Iași

Rules for classification: 1) Points; 2) Head-to-head points; 3) Head-to-head goal difference; 4) Head-to-head goals scored; 5) Head-to-head away goals scored; 6) Goal difference; 7) Goals scored.
(C) Champions; (Q) Qualified for the phase indicated; (R) Relegated

=== Ilfov County ===
Pos	Team	Pld	W	D	L	GF	GA	GD	Pts	Qualification or relegation
1	Progresul Cernica (Q)	26	22	2	2	121	25	+96	68	Qualification to championship play-off
2	Corbeanca (Q)	26	20	4	2	105	27	+78	64	Qualification to championship play-off
3	Viitorul Dragomirești (Q)	26	16	1	9	79	37	+42	49	Qualification to championship play-off
4	Ciorogârla (Q)	26	15	3	8	77	54	+23	48	Qualification to championship play-off
5	Bragadiru	26	12	3	11	51	40	+11	39	
6	Măgurele	26	11	6	9	48	61	−13	39	
7	Ștefănești II	26	11	4	11	79	62	+17	37	
8	Glina	26	10	4	12	56	78	−22	34	
9	Codrii Vlăsiei Moara Vlăsiei	26	9	5	12	50	56	−6	32	
10	Voința Periș	26	10	2	14	51	80	−29	32	
11	Viitorul Găneasa	26	9	4	13	52	74	−22	31	
12	Pescărușul Grădiștea	26	8	4	14	55	68	−13	28	
13	Dărăști	26	4	4	18	35	95	−60	16	
14	Voluntari II	26	2	0	24	28	127	−99	6	

Rules for classification: 1) Points; 2) Head-to-head points; 3) Head-to-head goal difference; 4) Head-to-head goals scored; 5) Head-to-head away goals scored; 6) Goal difference; 7) Goals scored.
(Q) Qualified for the phase indicated

==== Championship play-off ====
Championship play-off played in a single round-robin tournament between the best four teams of the regular season. The teams started the play-off with the following points: 1st place – 3 points, 2nd place – 2 points, 3rd place – 1 point, 4th place – 0 points.

Pos	Team	Pld	W	D	L	GF	GA	GD	Pts	Qualification
1	Progresul Cernica (C, Q)	3	3	0	0	11	7	+4	12	Qualification for promotion play-off
2	Corbeanca	3	2	0	1	10	4	+6	8	
3	Viitorul Dragomirești	3	1	0	2	7	8	−1	4	
4	Ciorogârla	3	0	0	3	4	13	−9	0	

Rules for classification: 1) Points; 2) Head-to-head points; 3) Head-to-head goal difference; 4) Head-to-head goals scored; 5) Head-to-head away goals scored; 6) Goal difference; 7) Goals scored.
(C) Champions; (Q) Qualified for the phase indicated

=== Maramureș County ===
==== North Series ====
Pos	Team	Pld	W	D	L	GF	GA	GD	Pts	Qualification or relegation
1	Plimob Sighetu Marmației (Q)	24	21	2	1	101	22	+79	65	Qualification to championship final
2	Rozalina Rozavlea	24	18	3	3	97	25	+72	57	
3	Iza Dragomirești	24	18	2	4	88	40	+48	56	
4	Borșa	24	17	3	4	112	42	+70	54	
5	Zorile Moisei	24	15	3	6	83	36	+47	48	
6	Luceafărul Strâmtura	24	11	3	10	70	52	+18	36	
7	Marmația Sighetu Marmației	24	10	2	12	73	62	+11	32	
8	Salina Ocna Șugatag	24	7	1	16	54	90	−36	22	
9	Foresta Câmpulung la Tisa	24	7	1	16	40	79	−39	22	
10	Brișca Sarasău	24	6	1	17	36	103	−67	19	
11	Recolta Săliștea de Sus	24	5	1	18	41	106	−65	16	
12	Avântul Bârsana	24	4	3	17	38	97	−59	15	
13	Bradul Vișeu de Sus	24	4	1	19	37	116	−79	13	

(Q) Qualified for the phase indicated

==== South Series ====
Pos	Team	Pld	W	D	L	GF	GA	GD	Pts	Qualification or relegation
1	Spicul Ardusat (Q)	26	21	3	2	117	44	+73	66	Qualification to championship final
2	Eaton Fărcașa	26	21	1	4	92	41	+51	64	
3	Progresul Șomcuta Mare	26	19	4	3	95	48	+47	61	
4	Viorel Mateianu Baia Mare	26	17	3	6	110	45	+65	54	
5	Unirea Șișești	26	12	4	10	65	61	+4	40	
6	Vectrix Satulung	26	12	3	11	56	51	+5	39	
7	Maramureș Universitar Baia Mare II	26	12	2	12	87	75	+12	38	
8	Unirea Seini	26	10	4	12	57	51	+6	34	
9	Orizont Lăpușel	26	10	2	14	61	68	−7	32	
10	Lăpușul Târgu Lăpuș	26	8	5	13	53	79	−26	29	
11	Gloria Renel Baia Mare	26	9	0	17	55	79	−24	27	
12	Xela Asten Tăuții-Măgherăuș	26	6	3	17	40	104	−64	21	
13	Spicul Mocira	26	4	3	19	44	106	−62	15	
14	Minerul Cavnic	26	2	1	23	29	109	−80	7	

(Q) Qualified for the phase indicated

==== Championship final ====
Team 1	Score	Team 2
Plimob Sighetu Marmației	1–0	Spicul Ardusat

Plimob Sighetu Marmației won the 2011–12 Liga IV Maramureș County and qualify to promotion play-off in Liga III.

=== Mehedinți County ===
Pos	Team	Pld	W	D	L	GF	GA	GD	Pts	Qualification or relegation
1	Pandurii Cerneți (C, Q)	36	32	3	1	118	27	+91	99	Qualification to promotion play-off
2	Minerul Valea Copcii	36	29	2	5	157	35	+122	89	
3	Recolta Dănceu	36	29	2	5	155	40	+115	89	
4	Phoenix Izvorul Bârzii	36	23	3	10	111	62	+49	72	
5	Baia de Aramă	36	22	3	11	105	36	+69	69	
6	Dunărea Pristol	36	21	3	12	103	73	+30	66	
7	Real Vânju Mare	36	17	4	15	91	71	+20	55	
8	Strehaia	36	16	7	13	72	63	+9	55	
9	Dunărea Gruia	36	17	3	16	77	65	+12	54 (Note: Dunărea Gruia, Termo Drobeta-Turnu Severin, Coop Vânju Mare, Victoria Devesel and Constructorul Eșelnița withdrew from the championship and lost all the remaining matches with 0–3.)	
10	Blahnița Pătulele	36	17	1	18	75	81	−6	52	
11	Termo Drobeta-Turnu Severin	36	16	2	18	113	64	+49	50	
12	Viitorul Cujmir	36	14	3	19	60	84	−24	45	
13	Gloria Rogova	36	13	4	19	55	62	−7	43	
14	Kladova Drobeta-Turnu Severin	36	12	1	23	68	123	−55	37	
15	Coop Vânju Mare	36	11	3	22	57	81	−24	36	
16	Agromec Șimian	36	9	4	23	47	96	−49	31	
17	Corcova	36	7	0	29	46	184	−138	21	
18	Victoria Devesel	36	5	0	31	37	197	−160	15	
19	Constructorul Eșelnița	36	1	2	33	17	173	−156	5	

Rules for classification: 1) Points; 2) Head-to-head points; 3) Head-to-head goal difference; 4) Head-to-head goals scored; 5) Head-to-head away goals scored; 6) Goal difference; 7) Goals scored.
(C) Champions; (Q) Qualified for the phase indicated

=== Mureș County ===
Pos	Team	Pld	W	D	L	GF	GA	GD	Pts	Qualification or relegation
1	Lacul Ursu Mobila Sovata (C, Q)	26	19	1	6	76	36	+40	58	Qualification to promotion play-off
2	Miercurea Nirajului	26	15	5	6	56	35	+21	50	
3	MSE 08 Târgu Mureș	26	15	4	7	63	38	+25	49	
4	Înfrățirea Valea Izvoarelor	26	15	4	7	53	39	+14	49	
5	Mureșul Luduș	26	15	2	9	55	35	+20	47	
6	Mureșul Rușii-Munți	26	12	6	8	57	42	+15	42	
7	Gaz Metan Târgu Mureș	26	12	4	10	50	42	+8	40	
8	Iernut	26	11	5	10	62	44	+18	38	
9	Avântul Miheșu de Câmpie	26	10	3	13	46	61	−15	33	
10	Mureșul Cuci	26	10	1	15	47	69	−22	31	
11	Gaz Metan Daneș	26	10	3	13	60	61	−1	30 (Note: Gaz Metan Daneș deducted 3 points)	
12	Sărmașu	26	8	3	15	41	60	−19	27	
13	Junior Târgu Mureș	26	7	2	17	36	57	−21	23	
14	Voința Gănești	26	1	1	24	19	102	−83	4 (Note: Voința Gănești withdrew after 16 rounds and lost all the remaining matches with 0–3.)	

Rules for classification: 1) Points; 2) Head-to-head points; 3) Head-to-head goal difference; 4) Head-to-head goals scored; 5) Head-to-head away goals scored; 6) Goal difference; 7) Goals scored.
(C) Champions; (Q) Qualified for the phase indicated

=== Neamț County ===
Pos	Team	Pld	W	D	L	GF	GA	GD	Pts	Qualification or relegation
1	Biruința Negrești (C, Q)	28	27	0	1	118	19	+99	81	Qualification to promotion play-off
2	Voința Ion Creangă	28	19	4	5	78	31	+47	61	
3	Speranța Răucești	28	19	1	8	97	55	+42	58	
4	Spicul Tămășeni	28	19	1	8	84	50	+34	58	
5	Energia Pângărați	28	16	2	10	77	66	+11	50	
6	Moldova Cordun	28	14	3	11	55	50	+5	45	
7	Bradul Roznov	28	13	4	11	99	58	+41	43	
8	Bravo Bodești	28	12	4	12	78	80	−2	40	
9	Victoria Horia	28	11	2	15	64	68	−4	35	
10	Zimbrul Vânători-Neamț	28	10	2	16	51	70	−19	32	
11	Voința Dochia	28	9	2	17	52	70	−18	29	
12	Avântul Petricani	28	8	3	17	57	97	−40	27	
13	Flacăra Brusturi	28	7	1	20	42	108	−66	22	
14	Inter Girov	28	5	3	20	50	121	−71	18	
15	Viitorul Podoleni	28	5	0	23	45	104	−59	15	
16	Ozana Timișești (D)	0	0	0	0	0	0	0	0 (Note: Bradul Borca, Ozana Timișești and Vulturul Zănești were withdrew in the first part of the season and all their results were canceled.)	Withdrew
17	Vulturul Zănești (D)	0	0	0	0	0	0	0	0	Withdrew
18	Bradul Borca (D)	0	0	0	0	0	0	0	0	Withdrew

Rules for classification: 1) Points; 2) Head-to-head points; 3) Head-to-head goal difference; 4) Head-to-head goals scored; 5) Head-to-head away goals scored; 6) Goal difference; 7) Goals scored.
(C) Champions; (D) Disqualified; (Q) Qualified for the phase indicated

=== Olt County ===
Pos	Team	Pld	W	D	L	GF	GA	GD	Pts	Qualification or relegation
1	Viitorul Grădinile (C, Q)	34	28	5	1	128	36	+92	89	Qualification to promotion play-off
2	Recolta Stoicănești	34	27	4	3	115	33	+82	85	
3	Internațional Brebeni	34	24	2	8	93	33	+60	74	
4	Unirea Turia	34	23	3	8	105	52	+53	72	
5	Petrolul Potcoava	34	21	4	9	66	34	+32	67	
6	Știința Drăgănești-Olt	34	19	6	9	91	35	+56	63	
7	Avântul Coteana	34	19	3	12	96	61	+35	60	
8	Viitorul Rusănești	34	17	3	14	87	79	+8	54	
9	Olt Scornicești	34	15	2	17	89	85	+4	47	
10	Iancu Jianu	24	14	3	7	89	85	+4	45	
11	Gloria Vișina	34	14	3	17	55	92	−37	45	
12	Olimpia Rotunda	34	13	3	18	75	75	0	42	
13	Vedea Văleni	34	12	4	18	72	87	−15	40	
14	Recolta Bălteni	34	9	4	21	45	94	−49	31	
15	Gloria Deveselu	34	10	1	23	47	110	−63	31	
16	Recolta Urzica	34	5	6	23	40	116	−76	21	
17	Balș	34	3	2	29	30	143	−113	11	
18	Știința Dăneasa	34	3	0	31	18	100	−82	9	

Rules for classification: 1) Points; 2) Head-to-head points; 3) Head-to-head goal difference; 4) Head-to-head goals scored; 5) Head-to-head away goals scored; 6) Goal difference; 7) Goals scored.
(C) Champions; (Q) Qualified for the phase indicated

=== Prahova County ===
Pos	Team	Pld	W	D	L	GF	GA	GD	Pts	Qualification or relegation
1	Unirea Câmpina (C, Q)	34	29	5	0	83	10	+73	92	Qualification to promotion play-off
2	Blejoi	34	27	5	2	108	25	+83	86	
3	Petrolistul Boldești	34	24	3	7	90	31	+59	75	
4	CSM Câmpina	34	22	4	8	78	36	+42	70	
5	Avântul Măneciu	34	18	4	12	82	43	+39	58	
6	Păulești	34	17	7	10	69	50	+19	58	
7	Progresul Drăgănești	34	19	0	15	81	52	+29	57	
8	Bănești Urleta	34	13	7	14	60	72	−12	46	
9	Ceptura	34	13	5	16	64	64	0	44	
10	Astra Ploiești III	34	13	4	17	60	66	−6	43	
11	Dero Ploiești	34	13	3	18	51	68	−17	42	
12	Unirea Urlați	34	12	6	16	46	69	−23	42	
13	Petrolul Ploiești II	34	11	7	16	43	57	−14	40	
14	Brebu	34	11	3	20	48	67	−19	36	
15	Caraimanul Bușteni (Note: Due to the promotion of Unirea Câmpina to Liga III, Caraimanul Bușteni was spared from relegation.)	34	10	2	22	36	66	−30	32	Spared from relegation
16	Carpați MEFIN Sinaia (R)	34	9	4	21	27	101	−74	31	Relegation to Liga V Prahova
17	Tinerețea Izvoarele (R)	34	6	4	24	42	118	−76	22	Relegation to Liga V Prahova
18	Chimia II Vadu Săpat (R)	34	2	1	31	19	92	−73	7 (Note: Chimia II Vadu Săpat withdrew from the championship and they lost all the matches from the second part of the season with 0-3.)	Relegation to Liga V Prahova

Rules for classification: 1) Points; 2) Head-to-head points; 3) Head-to-head goal difference; 4) Head-to-head goals scored; 5) Head-to-head away goals scored; 6) Goal difference; 7) Goals scored.
(C) Champions; (Q) Qualified for the phase indicated; (R) Relegated

=== Satu Mare County ===
==== Seria A ====
Pos	Team	Pld	W	D	L	GF	GA	GD	Pts	Qualification or relegation
1	Someșul Cărășeu (Q)	28	23	3	2	91	24	+67	72	Qualification to championship final
2	Recolta Dorolț	28	19	6	3	80	21	+59	63	
3	Gama Best Satu Mare	27	19	4	4	84	36	+48	61	
4	Talna Orașu Nou	28	17	4	7	83	35	+48	55	
5	Energia Negrești-Oaș	28	16	2	10	56	37	+19	50	
6	Turul Micula	28	12	7	9	80	40	+40	43	
7	Dacia Medieșu Aurit	28	13	4	11	60	39	+21	43	
8	Cetate 2010 Ardud	26	9	8	9	47	46	+1	35	
9	Voința Doba	28	9	5	14	51	62	−11	32	
10	Livada	27	9	5	13	44	53	−9	32	
11	Voința Lazuri	28	9	3	16	37	84	−47	30	
12	Voința Sătmărel	27	9	0	18	39	87	−48	27	
13	Someșul Odoreu	28	6	5	17	33	82	−49	23	
14	Sportul Botiz	28	5	2	21	43	98	−55	17	
15	Unirea Păulești	27	2	1	24	23	109	−86	7	
16	Minerul Turț (D)	0	0	0	0	0	0	0	0 (Note: Minerul Turț withdrew in the first part of the season and all its results were canceled.)	Withdrew

Rules for classification: 1) Points; 2) Head-to-head points; 3) Head-to-head goal difference; 4) Head-to-head goals scored; 5) Head-to-head away goals scored; 6) Goal difference; 7) Goals scored.
(D) Disqualified; (Q) Qualified for the phase indicated

==== Seria B ====
Pos	Team	Pld	W	D	L	GF	GA	GD	Pts	Qualification or relegation
1	Schwaben Kalmandi Cămin (Q)	30	25	4	1	101	29	+72	79	Qualification to championship final
2	Unirea Tășnad	30	25	4	1	127	32	+95	79	
3	Someșul Oar	30	23	5	2	120	27	+93	74	
4	Olimpia Căuaș	30	16	6	8	51	43	+8	54	
5	Viitorul Vetiș	29	15	0	14	62	55	+7	45	
6	Real Andrid	30	13	4	13	57	57	0	43	
7	Fortuna Căpleni	30	11	8	11	40	55	−15	41	
8	Frohlich Foieni	30	10	7	13	48	49	−1	37	
9	Kneho Urziceni	30	10	7	13	30	35	−5	37	
10	Unirea Pișcolt	30	12	1	17	45	66	−21	37	
11	Victoria Petrești	30	10	4	16	46	71	−25	34	
12	Gloria Moftinu Mare	30	7	5	18	38	73	−35	26	
13	Victoria Carei	30	7	5	18	34	93	−59	26	
14	Stăruința Berveni	29	8	1	20	36	67	−31	25	
15	Voința Babța	30	6	5	19	48	83	−35	23	
16	Recolta Sanislău (R)	30	5	6	19	38	86	−48	21	Relegation to Liga V Satu Mare

Rules for classification: 1) Points; 2) Head-to-head points; 3) Head-to-head goal difference; 4) Head-to-head goals scored; 5) Head-to-head away goals scored; 6) Goal difference; 7) Goals scored.
(Q) Qualified for the phase indicated; (R) Relegated

==== Championship final ====
The championship final was played on 9 June 2012 at Olimpia Stadium in Satu Mare.

Team 1	Score	Team 2
Someșul Cărășeu	2–0	Schwaben Kalmandi Cămin

Someșul Cărășeu won the 2011–12 Liga IV Satu Mare County and qualify to promotion play-off in Liga III.

=== Sălaj County ===
Pos	Team	Pld	W	D	L	GF	GA	GD	Pts	Qualification
1	Flacăra Halmășd (C, Q)	22	19	2	1	96	33	+63	59	Qualification to promotion play-off
2	Barcău Nușfalău	22	16	2	4	87	32	+55	50	
3	Rapid Jibou	22	13	5	4	67	25	+42	44	
4	Dumbrava Gâlgău Almașului	22	12	6	4	65	28	+37	42	
5	Gloria Bobota	22	11	3	8	57	36	+21	36	
6	Chieșd	22	10	3	9	48	53	−5	33	
7	Inter Cizer	22	9	5	8	49	48	+1	32	
8	Meseșul Treznea	22	8	5	9	39	48	−9	29	
9	Cetatea Almașu	22	5	2	15	38	81	−43	17	
10	Silvania Cehu Silvaniei	22	5	1	16	22	56	−34	16	
11	Venus Măeriște	22	4	2	16	26	86	−60	14	
12	Benfica Ileanda	22	2	0	20	29	97	−68	6	

Rules for classification: 1) Points; 2) Head-to-head points; 3) Head-to-head goal difference; 4) Head-to-head goals scored; 5) Head-to-head away goals scored; 6) Goal difference; 7) Goals scored.
(C) Champions; (Q) Qualified for the phase indicated

=== Sibiu County ===
Pos	Team	Pld	W	D	L	GF	GA	GD	Pts	Qualification or relegation
1	Sevișul Șelimbăr (C, Q)	20	18	1	1	80	14	+66	55	Qualification to promotion play-off
2	Sparta Mediaș	20	15	3	2	50	18	+32	48	
3	Agnita	19	11	3	5	42	25	+17	36	
4	Voința Sibiu II	19	11	2	6	42	24	+18	35	
5	Amicii Copșa Mică	20	8	2	10	36	40	−4	26	
6	Interstar Sibiu	18	7	2	9	35	33	+2	23	
7	Progresul Terezian Sibiu	19	7	2	10	18	32	−14	23	
8	Avrig	19	6	3	10	21	35	−14	21	
9	Tălmaciu	19	6	1	12	26	49	−23	19	
10	ASA Sibiu	20	3	1	16	17	56	−39	10	
11	Unirea Ocna Sibiului	19	2	4	13	13	54	−41	10	

Rules for classification: 1) Points; 2) Head-to-head points; 3) Head-to-head goal difference; 4) Head-to-head goals scored; 5) Head-to-head away goals scored; 6) Goal difference; 7) Goals scored.
(C) Champions; (Q) Qualified for the phase indicated

=== Suceava County ===
Pos	Team	Pld	W	D	L	GF	GA	GD	Pts	Qualification or relegation
1	Bucovina Frătăuții Noi (C, Q)	30	23	5	2	114	35	+79	74	Qualification to promotion play-off
2	Minerul Iacobeni	30	23	4	3	118	35	+83	73	
3	Foresta Mălini	30	20	5	5	120	30	+90	65	
4	Sporting II Arbore	30	16	6	8	66	47	+19	54	
5	Viitorul Liteni	30	15	3	12	65	61	+4	48	
6	Foresta Moldovița	30	13	3	14	61	53	+8	42	
7	Rapid CFR II Mihoveni	30	12	4	14	70	85	−15	40	
8	Avântul Volovăț	30	12	3	15	51	63	−12	39	
9	Moldova Drăgușeni	30	11	5	14	59	77	−18	38	
10	Unirea Boroaia	30	12	1	17	61	72	−11	37	
11	Zimbrul Siret	30	9	10	11	51	68	−17	37	
12	Florconstruct Pătrăuți	30	11	2	17	49	68	−19	35	
13	Voința Stroiești	30	11	2	17	36	75	−39	35	
14	Gura Humorului (R)	30	9	7	14	49	50	−1	34	Relegation to Liga V Suceava
15	Marginea (R)	30	9	3	18	55	95	−40	30	Relegation to Liga V Suceava
16	Rarăul Câmpulung Moldovenesc (R)	30	2	1	27	10	121	−111	7 (Note: Rarăul Câmpulung Moldovenesc withdrew from the championship and lost all the matches from the second part of the championship with 0–3.)	Relegation to Liga V Suceava

Rules for classification: 1) Points; 2) Head-to-head points; 3) Head-to-head goal difference; 4) Head-to-head goals scored; 5) Head-to-head away goals scored; 6) Goal difference; 7) Goals scored.
(C) Champions; (Q) Qualified for the phase indicated; (R) Relegated

=== Teleorman County ===
Pos	Team	Pld	W	D	L	GF	GA	GD	Pts	Qualification or relegation
1	Pamimai Videle (C, Q)	30	21	5	4	79	30	+49	68	Qualification to promotion play-off
2	Viață Nouă Olteni	30	16	7	7	72	53	+19	55	
3	Metalul Frăsinet	30	16	6	8	82	34	+48	54	
4	Voința Saelele	30	15	8	7	74	41	+33	53	
5	Sporting Roșiori	30	14	8	8	64	39	+25	50	
6	Metalul Peretu	30	15	5	10	76	56	+20	50	
7	Dunărea Zimnicea	30	13	8	9	71	54	+17	47	
8	Unirea Țigănești	30	12	6	12	58	49	+9	42	
9	Udinese Uda Clocociov	30	13	3	14	53	49	+4	42	
10	Flacăra Talpa	30	12	4	14	71	53	+18	40	
11	Spicpo Poroschia	30	12	4	14	60	68	−8	40	
12	Rapid Buzescu	30	10	8	12	51	42	+9	38	
13	Steaua Spătărei (R)	30	11	5	14	51	74	−23	38	Relegation to Liga V Teleorman
14	Ajax Botoroaga (R)	30	11	0	19	54	83	−29	33	Relegation to Liga V Teleorman
15	CSȘ Alexandria (R)	30	5	4	21	49	83	−34	19	Relegation to Liga V Teleorman
16	Petrolul Poeni (R)	30	2	3	25	28	185	−157	9	Relegation to Liga V Teleorman

Rules for classification: 1) Points; 2) Head-to-head points; 3) Head-to-head goal difference; 4) Head-to-head goals scored; 5) Head-to-head away goals scored; 6) Goal difference; 7) Goals scored.
(C) Champions; (Q) Qualified for the phase indicated; (R) Relegated

=== Timiș County ===
Pos	Team	Pld	W	D	L	GF	GA	GD	Pts	Qualification or relegation
1	Lugoj (C, Q)	34	31	2	1	144	14	+130	95	Qualification to promotion play-off
2	Chișoda	34	25	4	5	105	36	+69	79	
3	CFR Timișoara	34	25	3	6	101	40	+61	78	
4	Pobeda Dudeștii Vechi	34	18	7	9	72	45	+27	61	
5	Dumbrăvița	34	16	7	11	58	42	+16	55	
6	Marcel Băban Jimbolia	34	13	11	10	57	47	+10	50	
7	Timișul Șag	34	14	8	12	53	43	+10	50	
8	Auto Timișoara	34	15	2	17	64	60	+4	47	
9	Arsenal Bucovăț	34	12	7	15	62	81	−19	43	
10	Real Dragșina	34	12	6	16	47	75	−28	42	
11	Spartak Gottlob	34	12	5	17	50	52	−2	41	
12	Banatul Nerău	34	12	4	18	50	94	−44	40	
13	Unirea Cerneteaz	34	12	3	19	48	92	−44	39	
14	Peciu Nou	34	10	7	17	50	81	−31	37	
15	Avântul Bobda	34	10	4	20	52	88	−36	34	
16	Deta (R)	34	8	6	20	45	83	−38	30	Relegation to Liga V Timiș
17	Juventus Pișchia (R)	34	10	3	21	38	77	−39	27 (Note: Juventus Pișchia deducted 6 points.)	Relegation to Liga V Timiș
18	Progresul Gătaia (R)	34	6	1	27	27	73	−46	19	Relegation to Liga V Timiș

Rules for classification: 1) Points; 2) Head-to-head points; 3) Head-to-head goal difference; 4) Head-to-head goals scored; 5) Head-to-head away goals scored; 6) Goal difference; 7) Goals scored.
(C) Champions; (Q) Qualified for the phase indicated; (R) Relegated

=== Tulcea County ===
Pos	Team	Pld	W	D	L	GF	GA	GD	Pts	Qualification or relegation
1	Unirea Casimcea (C, Q)	28	24	2	2	127	18	+109	74	Qualification to promotion play-off
2	Săgeata Stejaru	28	22	1	5	106	41	+65	67	
3	Pescărușul Sarichioi	28	21	2	5	82	31	+51	65	
4	Izbânda Lăstuni	28	21	1	6	87	43	+44	64	
5	Luceafărul Slava Cercheză	28	18	1	9	79	37	+42	55	
6	Triumf Cerna	28	18	0	10	78	48	+30	54	
7	Național Somova	28	13	3	12	69	73	−4	42	
8	Razim Jurilovca	28	13	0	15	70	67	+3	36 (Note: Razim Jurilovca deducted 3 points.)	
9	Arrubium Măcin	28	8	3	17	35	61	−26	27 (Note: Arrubium Măcin withdrew in the second part of the season and lost all the remaining matches with 0–3.)	
10	Progresul Isaccea	28	7	4	17	45	84	−39	25	
11	Flacăra Mihail Kogălniceanu	28	8	0	20	40	74	−34	24	
12	Troesmis Turcoaia	28	7	3	18	56	108	−52	24	
13	Granitul Babadag	28	8	0	20	51	104	−53	24	
14	Tractorul Horia	28	5	1	22	34	126	−92	16	
15	Gloria Agighiol	28	6	1	21	32	82	−50	13 (Note: Gloria Agighiol deducted 6 points.)	

Rules for classification: 1) Points; 2) Head-to-head points; 3) Head-to-head goal difference; 4) Head-to-head goals scored; 5) Head-to-head away goals scored; 6) Goal difference; 7) Goals scored.
(C) Champions; (Q) Qualified for the phase indicated

=== Vaslui County ===
Pos	Team	Pld	W	D	L	GF	GA	GD	Pts	Qualification or relegation
1	Huși (Q)	24	20	3	1	93	19	+74	63	Qualification to championship play-off
2	Juventus Fălciu (Q)	24	19	0	5	74	29	+45	57	Qualification to championship play-off
3	Foresta Zorleni (Q)	24	18	2	4	72	22	+50	56	Qualification to championship play-off
4	Vitis Șuletea (Q)	24	15	1	8	49	35	+14	46	Qualification to championship play-off
5	Autorom Pădureni	24	13	1	10	55	57	−2	40	
6	Drânceni	24	12	2	10	63	50	+13	35 (Note: Drânceni deducted 3 points.)	
7	Multim Perieni	24	11	1	12	51	55	−4	34	
8	Avântul Zăpodeni	24	8	3	13	49	62	−13	27	
9	Olimpia Stănilești	24	6	5	13	43	63	−20	23 (Note: Olimpia Stănilești and SMART Negrești were excluded from the championship.)	
10	Flacăra Murgeni	24	5	3	16	30	69	−39	18	
11	Vaslui II	24	5	2	17	31	66	−35	17	
12	SMART Negrești	24	5	2	17	17	58	−41	17	
13	LPS Vaslui	24	4	5	15	28	70	−42	17	

Rules for classification: 1) Points; 2) Head-to-head points; 3) Head-to-head goal difference; 4) Head-to-head goals scored; 5) Head-to-head away goals scored; 6) Goal difference; 7) Goals scored.
(Q) Qualified for the phase indicated

==== Championship play-off ====
Championship play-off was played in a double round-robin tournament between the best four teams of the regular season. The teams started the play-off with the following points: 1st place – 3 points, 2nd place – 2 points, 3rd place – 1 point, 4th place – 0 points.

Pos	Team	Pld	W	D	L	GF	GA	GD	Pts	Qualification	HUȘ	FZO	JFĂ	VIT
1	Huși (C, Q)	6	5	1	0	13	5	+8	19	Qualification to promotion play-off	—	2–1	3–1	1–1
2	Foresta Zorleni	6	3	0	3	15	13	+2	10		2–5	—	5–1	1–0
3	Juventus Fălciu	6	2	1	3	8	13	−5	9		0–1	3–1	—	2–1
4	Vitis Șuletea	6	0	2	4	5	10	−5	2		0–1	2–4	1–1	—

Rules for classification: 1) Points; 2) Head-to-head points; 3) Head-to-head goal difference; 4) Head-to-head goals scored; 5) Head-to-head away goals scored; 6) Goal difference; 7) Goals scored.
(C) Champions; (Q) Qualified for the phase indicated

=== Vâlcea County ===
Pos	Team	Pld	W	D	L	GF	GA	GD	Pts	Qualification or relegation
1	Posada Perișani (C, Q)	34	28	5	1	134	32	+102	89	Qualification to promotion play-off
2	Drăgășani	34	28	5	1	134	19	+115	89	
3	Flacăra Horezu	34	28	3	3	145	28	+117	87	
4	Hidroelectra Râmnicu Vâlcea	34	24	6	4	160	27	+133	78	
5	Minerul Berbești	34	24	3	7	120	50	+70	75	
6	Voința Orlești	34	18	7	9	89	44	+45	61	
7	Experți Popești	34	17	2	15	91	84	+7	53	
8	Viitorul Valea Mare	34	16	3	15	64	73	−9	51	
9	Lotru Brezoi	34	13	7	14	64	63	+1	46	
10	Unirea Păușești-Măglași	34	12	6	16	55	76	−21	42	
11	Șirineasa	34	11	7	16	58	64	−6	40	
12	Crețeni	34	10	6	18	63	82	−19	36	
13	Minerul Ocnele Mari	34	10	5	19	55	86	−31	35	
14	Băbeni	34	9	0	25	53	163	−110	27	
15	Dinamo 2007 Râmnicu Vâlcea (R)	34	6	4	24	41	90	−49	22 (Note: Dinamo 2007 Râmnicu Vâlcea withdrew in the second part of the season and lost all remaining matches with 0–3.)	Relegation to Liga V Vâlcea
16	Oltețul Zătreni	34	5	3	26	37	122	−85	18	
17	Victoria Frâncești (R)	34	5	2	27	32	175	−143	17	Relegation to Liga V Vâlcea
18	Popești (R)	34	3	4	27	39	161	−122	13	Relegation to Liga V Vâlcea

Rules for classification: 1) Points; 2) Head-to-head points; 3) Head-to-head goal difference; 4) Head-to-head goals scored; 5) Head-to-head away goals scored; 6) Goal difference; 7) Goals scored.
(C) Champions; (Q) Qualified for the phase indicated; (R) Relegated

=== Vrancea County ===
==== Seria Nord ====
Pos	Team	Pld	W	D	L	GF	GA	GD	Pts	Qualification
1	Național Golești	14	12	1	1	59	19	+40	37	Qualification to championship play-off
2	Șoimii Internațional Mircești	14	9	2	3	47	26	+21	29	Qualification to championship play-off
3	Avântul Jariștea	14	8	3	3	33	25	+8	27	Qualification to championship play-off
4	Viitorul Homocea	14	7	0	7	29	32	−3	21	Qualification to championship play-off
5	Voința Odobești	14	6	2	6	18	34	−16	20	Qualification to championship play-out
6	Unirea Țifești	14	3	2	9	26	36	−10	11	Qualification to championship play-out
7	Adjud	14	3	1	10	22	57	−35	10	Qualification to championship play-out
8	Mărășești	14	1	3	10	16	29	−13	6	Qualification to championship play-out

Rules for classification: 1) Points; 2) Head-to-head points; 3) Head-to-head goal difference; 4) Head-to-head goals scored; 5) Head-to-head away goals scored; 6) Goal difference; 7) Goals scored.

==== Seria Sud ====
Pos	Team	Pld	W	D	L	GF	GA	GD	Pts	Qualification
1	Energia Vulturu	14	12	2	0	45	21	+24	38	Qualification to championship play-off
2	Dinamo Tătăranu	14	9	1	4	46	19	+27	28	Qualification to championship play-off
3	Câmpineanca	14	8	1	5	23	16	+7	25	Qualification to championship play-off
4	Voința Slobozia Ciorăști	14	6	2	6	30	28	+2	20	Qualification to championship play-off
5	Flacăra Urechești	14	6	2	6	38	33	+5	20	Qualification to championship play-out
6	Unirea Milcovul	14	5	0	9	27	47	−20	15	Qualification to championship play-out
7	Victoria Gugești	14	3	4	7	27	41	−14	13	Qualification to championship play-out
8	Șoimii Năruja	14	0	2	12	8	39	−31	2	Qualification to championship play-out

Rules for classification: 1) Points; 2) Head-to-head points; 3) Head-to-head goal difference; 4) Head-to-head goals scored; 5) Head-to-head away goals scored; 6) Goal difference; 7) Goals scored.

==== Championship play-off ====
Pos	Team	Pld	W	D	L	GF	GA	GD	Pts	Qualification
1	Național Golești (C)	8	6	0	2	27	8	+19	18	Ineligible for promotion
2	Viitorul Homocea	8	5	1	2	23	10	+13	16	Ineligible for promotion
3	Avântul Jariștea	8	5	0	3	20	20	0	15	Ineligible for promotion
4	Șoimii Internațional Mircești	8	4	1	3	25	22	+3	13	Ineligible for promotion
5	Energia Vulturu (Q)	8	4	0	4	22	18	+4	12	Qualification to promotion play-off
6	Dinamo Tătăranu	8	3	2	3	13	15	−2	11	
7	Câmpineanca	8	3	0	5	18	21	−3	9	
8	Voința Slobozia Ciorăști	8	0	0	8	7	41	−34	0	

Rules for classification: 1) Points; 2) Head-to-head points; 3) Head-to-head goal difference; 4) Head-to-head goals scored; 5) Head-to-head away goals scored; 6) Goal difference; 7) Goals scored.
(C) Champions; (Q) Qualified for the phase indicated

==== Championship play-out ====
Pos	Team	Pld	W	D	L	GF	GA	GD	Pts	Relegation
9	Mărășești	8	7	0	1	20	5	+15	21	
10	Unirea Țifești	8	5	2	1	23	14	+9	17	
11	Voința Odobești	8	5	1	2	20	10	+10	16	
12	Adjud	8	4	1	3	20	13	+7	13	
13	Victoria Gugești	8	3	2	3	16	24	−8	11	
14	Flacăra Urechești	8	2	1	5	10	19	−9	7	
15	Unirea Milcovul (R)	8	2	1	5	16	26	−10	7	Relegation to Liga V Vrancea
16	Șoimii Năruja (R)	8	0	0	8	0	24	−24	0	Relegation to Liga V Vrancea

Rules for classification: 1) Points; 2) Head-to-head points; 3) Head-to-head goal difference; 4) Head-to-head goals scored; 5) Head-to-head away goals scored; 6) Goal difference; 7) Goals scored.
(R) Relegated

== See also ==
- 2011–12 Liga I
- 2011–12 Liga II
- 2011–12 Liga III
