= 1991–92 Divizia C =

Third tier Romanian football league

Divizia C
- Season: 1991–92

The 1991–92 Divizia C was the 36th season of Liga III, the third tier of the Romanian football league system. Starting with the following season season, the third division reduced the number of clubs to 80. As 18 clubs were relegated from the second division, only the top four teams from each series remained in the third division, while the others were relegated to the county championships.

== Team changes ==
=== To Divizia C ===
Relegated from Divizia B

- Siretul Pașcani
- Prahova Ploiești
- Poiana Câmpina
- Fortus Iași
- Mecanică Fină București
- Pandurii Târgu Jiu
- Minerul Motru
- Montana Sinaia
- Vulturii Lugoj
- CIL Sighetu Marmației
- Aurul Brad
- Progresul Timișoara

Promoted from County Championship

- CPL Bacău
- Sticla Arieșul Turda
- Unirea Dealu Mare Urlați
- Șantierul Naval Galați
- Victoria Țăndărei
- Sportul IACMRS Călărași
- Autobuzul IJTL Craiova
- CSU Hidrotehnica Sibiu
- Petrolul Târgu Cărbunești
- CSM Drobeta-Turnu Severin
- Tepro Iași
- Minerul Crucea
- Laminorul Roman
- Granitul Babadag
- Steaua Electrica Fieni
- Calculatorul București
- CFR Constanța
- Petrolul Roata de Jos
- Constructorul Slatina
- Carpați Brașov
- Parângul Lonea
- Auto FZB Timișoara
- CPL Arad
- Ardudeana Ardud
- Rapid Jibou

=== From Divizia C ===
Promoted to Divizia B

- Relonul Săvinești
- FEPA 74 Bârlad
- Petrolul Ianca
- Portul Constanța
- Faur București
- Metrom Brașov
- Olt 90 Scornicești
- Jiul IEELIF Craiova
- Electromureș Târgu Mureș
- Minerul Cavnic
- CFR Cluj
- UM Timișoara

Relegated to County Championship

- Avântul TCMM Frasin
- Zimbrul Siret
- Unirea Negrești
- Prutul 90 Fălciu
- Minerul Baraolt
- Carpați Covasna
- Progresul Isaccea
- Fortuna Tulcea
- Avicola Crevedia
- Știința Băneasa
- Minerul Șotânga
- Electromotor Câmpina
- SM Drăgănești-Olt
- IOB Balș
- Progresul Băilești
- Armătura Strehaia
- Metalul Reghin
- Textila Cisnădie
- Minerul Băița
- Unirea Seini
- Mecanica Sibiu
- Electrometal Cluj-Napoca
- CFR Arad

=== Renamed teams ===
Mecon Onești was renamed as Meconerg Onești.

Unirea Făurei was renamed as Unirea Progresul Făurei.

Electrica Titu was renamed as Electrosid Titu.

Petrolul Târgoviște was renamed as Petrolul Steaua Târgoviște.

Laminorul Zalău was renamed as Silcotub Zalău.

Mecanica Vaslui was renamed as Marvas Vaslui.

Unirea Dealu Mare Urlați was renamed as Unirea Urlați.

Unirea Bârlad was renamed as Unirea ABROM Bârlad.

Partizanul Bacău was renamed as Cotidianul Bacău.

IUPS Chitila was renamed as IEMUTREC Chitila.

Victoria Țăndărei was renamed as Olimpia Țăndărei.

Sportul IACMRS Călărași was renamed as Sportul IAMCRI Călărași.

Dunăreana Giurgiu was renamed as Dunărea Giurgiu.

Progresul CSS Medgidia was renamed as Progresul Medgidia.

Litoral Mangalia was renamed as Litoral Neptun Mangalia.

CSU Hidrotehnica Sibiu was renamed as Hidrotehnica U Sibiu.

Progresul Năsăud was renamed as Chimia Năsăud.

Constructorul TCI Craiova was renamed as Constructorul Craiova.

Progresul Odorheiu Secuiesc was renamed as Harghita Odorheiu Secuiesc.

Progresul Timișoara was renamed as Electrica Timișoara.

Chimia Brazi Ploiești was renamed as Chimia Ploiești.

Mecon București was renamed as Girueta București.

CSM Drobeta-Turnu Severin (football) was renamed as Severnav Drobeta-Turnu Severin.

Montana Sinaia was renamed as Montana Caraimanul Bușteni.

Steaua Electrica Fieni was renamed as Electrica Fieni.

Auto FZB Timișoara was renamed as Auto Timișoara.

== League tables ==
=== Seria I ===
Pos	Team	Pld	W	D	L	GF	GA	GD	Pts	Qualification or relegation
1	CFR Pașcani (C)	24	17	2	5	52	22	+30	36	Champions
2	CS Botoșani	24	17	1	6	58	30	+28	35	
3	Constructorul Iași	24	16	1	7	52	19	+33	33	
4	Bucovina Rădăuți	24	13	4	7	61	30	+31	30	
5	ASA Explorări Câmpulung Moldovenesc (R)	24	13	3	8	52	24	+28	29	Relegation to Divizia D
6	Steaua Minerul Vatra Dornei (R)	24	13	3	8	52	24	+28	29	Relegation to Divizia D
7	Tepro Iași (R)	24	12	2	10	33	27	+6	26	Relegation to Divizia D
8	Cristalul Dorohoi (R)	24	10	4	10	32	33	−1	24	Relegation to Divizia D
9	Steaua Mecanica Huși (R)	24	7	5	12	25	47	−22	19	Relegation to Divizia D
10	Minerul Gura Humorului (R)	24	7	1	16	29	51	−22	15	Relegation to Divizia D
11	Fortus Iași (R)	24	4	5	15	26	62	−36	13	Relegation to Divizia D
12	Minerul Crucea (R)	24	5	2	17	24	67	−43	12	Relegation to Divizia D
13	CSM Bucecea (R)	24	5	2	17	24	67	−43	12	Relegation to Divizia D
14	Aurora Târgu Frumos (D)	0	0	0	0	0	0	0	0	Withdrew
15	Carpați Gălănești (D)	0	0	0	0	0	0	0	0	Withdrew
16	Siretul Pașcani (D)	0	0	0	0	0	0	0	0	Withdrew

Source: romaniansoccer.ro
Rules for classification: 1) Points; 2) Goal difference; 3) Number of goals scored.
(C) Champions; (D) Disqualified; (R) Relegated

=== Seria II ===
Pos	Team	Pld	W	D	L	GF	GA	GD	Pts	Qualification or relegation
1	Cotidianul Bacău (C)	24	16	2	6	68	19	+49	34	Champions
2	Textila Buhuși	24	14	4	6	77	32	+45	32	
3	Cetatea Târgu Neamț	24	14	4	6	54	23	+31	32	
4	Meconerg Onești	24	15	1	8	58	32	+26	31	
5	IMASA Sfântu Gheorghe	24	13	3	8	59	35	+24	29	Relegation to Divizia D
6	Laminorul Roman (R)	24	10	4	10	33	39	−6	24	Relegation to Divizia D
7	Metalul Târgu Secuiesc (R)	24	9	5	10	33	39	−6	24 (Note: Metalul Târgu Secuiesc deducted 1 point.)	Relegation to Divizia D
8	Minerul Bălan (R)	24	9	4	11	30	53	−23	22	Relegation to Divizia D
9	Petrolul Moinești (R)	24	10	0	14	44	41	+3	20	Relegation to Divizia D
10	Electro Întorsura Buzăului (R)	24	7	5	12	31	50	−19	19	Relegation to Divizia D
11	Minerul Comănești (R)	24	8	2	14	27	84	−57	18	Relegation to Divizia D
12	Viitorul Gheorgheni (R)	24	7	1	16	27	67	−40	15	Relegation to Divizia D
13	CPL Bacău (R)	24	5	4	15	29	57	−28	14	Relegation to Divizia D
14	Proletarul Bacău (D)	0	0	0	0	0	0	0	0	Withdrew
15	Voința Roman (D)	0	0	0	0	0	0	0	0	Withdrew
16	Metalul Roman (D)	0	0	0	0	0	0	0	0	Withdrew

Source: romaniansoccer.ro
Rules for classification: 1) Points; 2) Goal difference; 3) Number of goals scored.
(C) Champions; (D) Disqualified; (R) Relegated

=== Seria III ===
Pos	Team	Pld	W	D	L	GF	GA	GD	Pts	Qualification or relegation
1	Delta Tulcea (C)	26	18	5	3	77	16	+61	41	Champions
2	Chimia Brăila	26	15	6	5	50	25	+25	36	
3	Celuloza Adjud	26	15	5	6	56	20	+36	35	
4	Marvas Vaslui	26	16	3	7	55	21	+34	35	
5	Dunărea Romport Galați (R)	26	15	5	6	58	30	+28	35	Relegation to Divizia D
6	Șantierul Naval Galați (R)	26	14	4	8	63	31	+32	32	Relegation to Divizia D
7	Victoria Galați (R)	26	11	6	9	63	40	+23	28	Relegation to Divizia D
8	Autobuzul Chimia Mărășești (R)	26	11	3	12	34	52	−18	23 (Note: Autobuzul Chimia Mărășești deducted 2 points.)	Relegation to Divizia D
9	Foresta Gugești (R)	26	10	2	14	31	52	−21	22	Relegation to Divizia D
10	Gloria Ivești (R)	26	9	3	14	39	44	−5	21	Relegation to Divizia D
11	Metalurgistul Tecuci (R)	26	7	3	16	44	55	−11	17	Relegation to Divizia D
12	Granitul Babadag (R)	26	6	2	18	31	80	−49	14	Relegation to Divizia D
13	Arrubium Măcin (R)	26	6	2	18	31	117	−86	14	Relegation to Divizia D
14	Unirea Progresul Făurei (R)	26	3	3	20	22	71	−49	9	Relegation to Divizia D
15	Tricotex Panciu (D)	0	0	0	0	0	0	0	0	Withdrew
16	Unirea Abrom Bârlad (D)	0	0	0	0	0	0	0	0	Withdrew

Source: romaniansoccer.ro
Rules for classification: 1) Points; 2) Goal difference; 3) Number of goals scored.
(C) Champions; (D) Disqualified; (R) Relegated

=== Seria IV ===
Pos	Team	Pld	W	D	L	GF	GA	GD	Pts	Qualification or relegation
1	Metalul Plopeni (C)	30	18	7	5	59	20	+39	43	Champions
2	Poiana Câmpina	30	20	2	8	72	28	+44	42	
3	Cimentul Fieni	30	20	2	8	70	35	+35	42	
4	Minerul Filipeștii de Pădure	30	19	2	9	56	31	+25	40	
5	Metalul Filipeștii de Pădure (R)	30	17	4	9	63	28	+35	38	Relegation to Divizia D
6	Petrolul Berca (R)	30	15	4	11	44	41	+3	34	Relegation to Divizia D
7	Unirea Urlați (R)	30	15	4	11	39	37	+2	34	Relegation to Divizia D
8	Metalul Buzău (R)	30	13	5	12	44	44	0	31	Relegation to Divizia D
9	IEMUTREC Chitila (R)	30	14	3	13	46	48	−2	31	Relegation to Divizia D
10	Hidrotehnica Buzău (R)	30	13	4	13	42	38	+4	30	Relegation to Divizia D
11	Metalul Mija (R)	30	10	6	14	44	55	−11	26	Relegation to Divizia D
12	CFR BTA București (R)	30	10	4	16	45	57	−12	24	Relegation to Divizia D
13	Tehnometal București (R)	30	8	4	18	38	63	−25	20	Relegation to Divizia D
14	Carpați Sinaia (R)	30	6	6	18	34	70	−36	18	Relegation to Divizia D
15	Chimia Buzău (R)	30	5	3	22	22	68	−46	13	Relegation to Divizia D
16	Montana Caraimanul Bușteni (R)	30	4	6	20	23	78	−55	13 (Note: Montana Caraimanul Bușteni deducted 1 point.)	Relegation to Divizia D

Source: romaniansoccer.ro
Rules for classification: 1) Points; 2) Goal difference; 3) Number of goals scored.
(C) Champions; (R) Relegated

=== Seria V ===
Pos	Team	Pld	W	D	L	GF	GA	GD	Pts	Qualification or relegation
1	Electrica Fieni (C)	28	17	4	7	53	36	+17	38	Champions
2	Calculatorul București	28	17	2	9	58	30	+28	36	
3	Prahova Ploiești	28	16	3	9	48	18	+30	35	
4	Mecos București	28	15	5	8	56	28	+28	35	
5	Electrosid Titu (R)	28	16	3	9	62	46	+16	35	Relegation to Divizia D
6	Victoria Florești (R)	28	14	5	9	50	23	+27	33	Relegation to Divizia D
7	IMGB București (R)	28	15	3	10	50	33	+17	33	Relegation to Divizia D
8	Chimia Găești (R)	28	13	4	11	42	45	−3	30	Relegation to Divizia D
9	Automatica București (R)	28	10	6	12	28	30	−2	26	Relegation to Divizia D
10	Petrolul Steaua Târgoviște (R)	28	8	6	14	35	46	−11	22	Relegation to Divizia D
11	Chimia Brazi (R)	28	9	4	15	47	55	−8	22	Relegation to Divizia D
12	Girueta București (R)	28	9	3	16	44	49	−5	21	Relegation to Divizia D
13	Unirea Urziceni (R)	28	9	2	17	34	75	−41	20	Relegation to Divizia D
14	Voința București (R)	28	9	2	17	34	75	−41	16 (Note: Voința București deducted 4 points.)	Relegation to Divizia D
15	Rapid Fetești (R)	28	6	2	20	30	90	−60	14	Relegation to Divizia D
16	Olimpia Țăndărei (D)	0	0	0	0	0	0	0	0	Withdrew

Source: romaniansoccer.ro
Rules for classification: 1) Points; 2) Goal difference; 3) Number of goals scored.
(C) Champions; (D) Disqualified; (R) Relegated

=== Seria VI ===
Pos	Team	Pld	W	D	L	GF	GA	GD	Pts	Qualification or relegation
1	Dunărea Călărași (C)	30	21	4	5	65	21	+44	46	Champions
2	Danubiana București	30	20	5	5	76	19	+57	45	
3	Unirea Tricolor București	30	17	9	4	53	20	+33	43	
4	Victoria Giurgiu	30	20	3	7	57	34	+23	43	
5	Viscofil București (R)	30	17	6	7	59	28	+31	40	Relegation to Divizia D
6	CFR Constanța (R)	30	17	4	9	59	41	+18	38	Relegation to Divizia D
7	Șantierul Naval Oltenița (R)	30	15	5	10	58	31	+27	35	Relegation to Divizia D
8	ISCIP Ulmeni (R)	30	15	2	13	62	41	+21	32	Relegation to Divizia D
9	Conpref Constanța (R)	30	11	5	14	49	43	+6	27	Relegation to Divizia D
10	Sportul IAMCRI Călărași (R)	30	11	4	15	48	51	−3	26	Relegation to Divizia D
11	Litoral Neptun Mangalia (R)	30	8	4	18	41	74	−33	20	Relegation to Divizia D
12	Dunărea Giurgiu (R)	30	10	3	17	41	70	−29	19 (Note: Dunărea Giurgiu deducted 4 points.)	Relegation to Divizia D
13	Petrolul Roata de Jos (R)	30	8	2	20	29	68	−39	18	Relegation to Divizia D
14	Viitorul Chirnogi (R)	30	6	4	20	31	67	−36	16	Relegation to Divizia D
15	Victoria Lehliu (R)	30	7	1	22	23	92	−69	15	Relegation to Divizia D
16	Progresul Medgidia (R)	30	5	3	22	31	82	−51	13	Relegation to Divizia D

Source: romaniansoccer.ro
Rules for classification: 1) Points; 2) Goal difference; 3) Number of goals scored.
(C) Champions; (R) Relegated

=== Seria VII ===
Pos	Team	Pld	W	D	L	GF	GA	GD	Pts	Qualification or relegation
1	Dacia Pitești (C)	28	22	2	4	79	18	+61	46	Champions
2	ROVA Roșiori	28	17	3	8	62	31	+31	37	
3	Electronistul Curtea de Argeș	28	17	2	9	63	30	+33	36	
4	Unirea Alexandria	28	17	1	10	54	27	+27	35	
5	Minerul Berbești (R)	28	17	0	11	68	45	+23	34	Relegation to Divizia D
6	Muscelul Câmpulung (R)	28	16	1	11	57	27	+30	33	Relegation to Divizia D
7	Unirea Pitești (R)	28	14	3	11	47	28	+19	31	Relegation to Divizia D
8	Constructorul Slatina (R)	28	13	5	10	48	39	+9	31	Relegation to Divizia D
9	Dunărea Zimnicea (R)	28	13	1	14	47	52	−5	27	Relegation to Divizia D
10	Metalul Râmnicu Vâlcea (R)	28	11	5	12	30	40	−10	27	Relegation to Divizia D
11	Progresul Corabia (R)	28	9	3	16	39	56	−17	21	Relegation to Divizia D
12	Chimia Turnu Măgurele (R)	28	8	4	16	35	62	−27	20	Relegation to Divizia D
13	Rulmentul Alexandria (R)	28	5	5	18	25	66	−41	15	Relegation to Divizia D
14	Recolta Stoicănești (R)	28	7	0	21	17	94	−77	14	Relegation to Divizia D
15	Viitorul Drăgășani (R)	28	4	5	19	29	85	−56	13	Relegation to Divizia D
16	Dacia Cozia Călimănești (D)	0	0	0	0	0	0	0	0	Withdrew

Source: romaniansoccer.ro
Rules for classification: 1) Points; 2) Goal difference; 3) Number of goals scored.
(C) Champions; (D) Disqualified; (R) Relegated

=== Seria VIII ===
Pos	Team	Pld	W	D	L	GF	GA	GD	Pts	Qualification or relegation
1	Mureșul Toplița (C)	30	19	4	7	78	25	+53	42	Champions
2	Avântul Reghin	30	19	4	7	57	28	+29	42	
3	Harghita Odorheiu Secuiesc	30	19	2	9	73	32	+41	40	
4	Nitramonia Făgăraș	30	18	3	9	71	26	+45	39	
5	Rapid Miercurea Ciuc (R)	30	18	1	11	67	42	+25	37	Relegation to Divizia D
6	Mecanica Bistrița (R)	30	15	5	10	67	47	+20	35	Relegation to Divizia D
7	Precizia Săcele (R)	30	16	2	12	69	39	+30	32 (Note: Precizia Săcele deducted 2 points.)	Relegation to Divizia D
8	Torpedo Zărnești (R)	30	14	4	12	52	42	+10	32	Relegation to Divizia D
9	Laminorul Beclean (R)	30	14	3	13	51	59	−8	31	Relegation to Divizia D
10	Carpați Agnita (R)	30	14	0	16	50	69	−19	28	Relegation to Divizia D
11	Carpați Brașov (R)	30	10	4	16	51	67	−16	24	Relegation to Divizia D
12	Mureșul Luduș (R)	30	10	2	18	42	78	−36	22	Relegation to Divizia D
13	Unirea Cristuru Secuiesc (R)	30	10	2	18	26	73	−47	22	Relegation to Divizia D
14	Hidrotehnica U Sibiu (R)	30	8	2	20	42	62	−20	18	Relegation to Divizia D
15	Chimia Năsăud (R)	30	8	2	20	26	98	−72	18	Relegation to Divizia D
16	Metalotehnica Târgu Mureș (R)	30	7	2	21	33	68	−35	16	Relegation to Divizia D

Source: romaniansoccer.ro
Rules for classification: 1) Points; 2) Goal difference; 3) Number of goals scored.
(C) Champions; (R) Relegated

=== Seria IX ===
Pos	Team	Pld	W	D	L	GF	GA	GD	Pts	Qualification or relegation
1	Minerul Mătăsari (C)	28	18	1	9	73	26	+47	37	Champions
2	Minerul Lupeni	28	17	3	8	65	34	+31	37	
3	Minerul Uricani	28	17	3	8	44	25	+19	37	
4	Paroșeni Vulcan	28	15	6	7	62	31	+31	36	
5	Constructorul Craiova (R)	28	15	5	8	76	36	+40	35	Relegation to Divizia D
6	Minerul Știința Vulcan (R)	28	16	3	9	67	36	+31	35	Relegation to Divizia D
7	Minerul Motru (R)	28	15	2	11	55	36	+19	32	Relegation to Divizia D
8	Petrolul Țicleni (R)	28	12	6	10	43	39	+4	30	Relegation to Divizia D
9	Dierna Orșova (R)	28	14	1	13	43	57	−14	29	Relegation to Divizia D
10	Severnav Drobeta-Turnu Severin (R)	28	13	1	14	48	51	−3	27	Relegation to Divizia D
11	Pandurii Târgu Jiu (R)	28	11	3	14	48	53	−5	25	Relegation to Divizia D
12	Parângul Lonea (R)	28	9	5	14	35	47	−12	23	Relegation to Divizia D
13	Petrolul Stoina (R)	28	8	2	18	33	65	−32	18	Relegation to Divizia D
14	SUCPI Craiova (R)	28	6	1	21	22	98	−76	9 (Note: SUCPI Craiova deducted 4 points.)	Relegation to Divizia D
15	Autobuzul IJTL Craiova (R)	28	2	3	23	18	98	−80	7	Relegation to Divizia D
16	Petrolul Târgu Cărbunești (R)	0	0	0	0	0	0	0	0	Withdrew

Source: romaniansoccer.ro
Rules for classification: 1) Points; 2) Goal difference; 3) Number of goals scored.
(C) Champions; (R) Relegated

=== Seria X ===
Pos	Team	Pld	W	D	L	GF	GA	GD	Pts	Qualification or relegation
1	Arsenal Reșița (C)	28	19	2	7	71	25	+46	40	Champions
2	CSM Caransebeș	28	17	5	6	61	23	+38	39	
3	Vulturii Lugoj	28	16	5	7	59	24	+35	37	
4	Minerul Anina	28	17	3	8	63	29	+34	37	
5	Unirea Tomnatic (R)	28	17	3	8	67	45	+22	37	Relegation to Divizia D
6	Victoria Călan (R)	28	17	0	11	56	38	+18	34	Relegation to Divizia D
7	Auto Timișoara (R)	28	15	1	12	49	41	+8	31	Relegation to Divizia D
8	Sânmartinu Sârbesc (R)	28	12	2	14	48	55	−7	26	Relegation to Divizia D
9	Minerul Moldova Nouă (R)	28	11	3	14	39	38	+1	25	Relegation to Divizia D
10	Electrica Timișoara (R)	28	13	0	15	55	44	+11	23 (Note: Electrica Timișoara deducted 3 points.)	Relegation to Divizia D
11	Energia Deta (R)	28	10	3	15	41	51	−10	23	Relegation to Divizia D
12	CFR Simeria (R)	28	8	4	16	38	59	−21	20	Relegation to Divizia D
13	Strungul Chișineu-Criș (R)	28	9	0	19	32	91	−59	18	Relegation to Divizia D
14	Unirea Sânnicolau Mare (R)	28	7	2	19	31	71	−40	16	Relegation to Divizia D
15	Retezatul Hațeg (R)	28	4	3	21	28	104	−76	11	Relegation to Divizia D
16	Ceramica Jimbolia (D)	0	0	0	0	0	0	0	0	Withdrew

Source: romaniansoccer.ro
Rules for classification: 1) Points; 2) Goal difference; 3) Number of goals scored.
(C) Champions; (D) Disqualified; (R) Relegated

=== Seria XI ===
Pos	Team	Pld	W	D	L	GF	GA	GD	Pts	Qualification or relegation
1	Șoimii Lipova (C)	28	16	3	9	52	36	+16	35	Champions
2	Unirea Dej	28	16	3	9	39	37	+2	35	
3	Metalul Aiud	28	16	2	10	46	25	+21	34	
4	Motorul Arad	28	17	0	11	50	40	+10	34	
5	Mureșul Deva (R)	28	15	2	11	51	34	+17	32	Relegation to Divizia D
6	Minerul Ștei (R)	28	14	4	10	39	32	+7	32	Relegation to Divizia D
7	Aurul Brad (R)	28	14	1	13	52	34	+18	29	Relegation to Divizia D
8	Sticla Arieșul Turda (R)	28	12	4	12	40	38	+2	28	Relegation to Divizia D
9	Industria Sârmei Câmpia Turzii (R)	28	12	4	12	37	36	+1	28	Relegation to Divizia D
10	Mecanica Alba Iulia (R)	28	13	2	13	33	52	−19	28	Relegation to Divizia D
11	Soda Ocna Mureș (R)	28	12	2	14	41	40	+1	26	Relegation to Divizia D
12	Înfrățirea Oradea (R)	28	9	5	14	49	37	+12	23	Relegation to Divizia D
13	CPL Arad (R)	28	8	5	15	43	48	−5	21	Relegation to Divizia D
14	CUG Cluj-Napoca (R)	28	7	4	17	28	60	−32	18	Relegation to Divizia D
15	Oțelul Ștei (R)	28	7	3	18	23	74	−51	17	Relegation to Divizia D
16	Petrolul Arad (D)	0	0	0	0	0	0	0	0	Withdrew

Source: romaniansoccer.ro
Rules for classification: 1) Points; 2) Goal difference; 3) Number of goals scored.
(C) Champions; (D) Disqualified; (R) Relegated

=== Seria XII ===
Pos	Team	Pld	W	D	L	GF	GA	GD	Pts	Qualification or relegation
1	Cuprom Baia Mare (C)	24	17	0	7	62	28	+34	34	Champions
2	Silcotub Zalău	24	16	1	7	63	33	+30	33	
3	Someșul Satu Mare	24	15	1	8	61	29	+32	31	
4	Victoria Carei	24	15	1	8	54	26	+28	31	
5	Ardudeana Ardud (R)	24	13	1	10	68	26	+42	27	Relegation to Divizia D
6	Mobila Șimleu Silvaniei (R)	24	11	2	11	48	47	+1	24	Relegation to Divizia D
7	Minerul Baia Sprie (R)	24	11	1	12	37	29	+8	23	Relegation to Divizia D
8	Bradul Vișeu de Sus (R)	24	11	1	12	36	57	−21	23	Relegation to Divizia D
9	Minerul Baia Borșa (R)	24	10	1	13	38	52	−14	21	Relegation to Divizia D
10	Minerul Turț (R)	24	8	3	13	29	53	−24	19	Relegation to Divizia D
11	Voința Negrești-Oaș (R)	24	9	1	14	33	59	−26	19	Relegation to Divizia D
12	Chimia Tășnad (R)	24	8	0	16	33	69	−36	14 (Note: Chimia Tășnad deducted 2 points.)	Relegation to Divizia D
13	Minerul Sărmășag (R)	24	3	3	18	24	78	−54	9	Relegation to Divizia D
14	Oașul Negrești-Oaș (D)	0	0	0	0	0	0	0	0	Withdrew
15	CIL Sighetu Marmației (D)	0	0	0	0	0	0	0	0	Withdrew
16	Rapid Jibou (D)	0	0	0	0	0	0	0	0	Withdrew

Source: romaniansoccer.ro
Rules for classification: 1) Points; 2) Goal difference; 3) Number of goals scored.
(C) Champions; (D) Disqualified; (R) Relegated

== See also ==
- 1991–92 Divizia A
- 1991–92 Divizia B
- 1991–92 County Championship
- 1991–92 Cupa României
