= CSM Roman (football) =

Romanian football club

- Full name: Club Sportiv Municipal Roman
- Nickname: Țevarii (The Pipefitters)
- Short name: CSM
- Founded: 1954; 72 years ago as Laminorul Roman; 2021; 5 years ago (refounded)
- Ground: Moldova
- Capacity: 100 (reduced from 15,000)
- Owner: Roman Municipality
- Chairman: Maricel Benchea
- Manager: Gabriel Țapu
- League: Liga IV
- 2025–26: Liga IV, Neamț County, 5th of 14
- Website: http://csmroman.ro/
Home colours	Away colours

Club Sportiv Municipal Roman, commonly known as CSM Roman, is a Romanian football team based in Roman, Neamț County, currently competing in Liga IV – Neamț County, the fourth tier of Romanian football.

The team represents the men's football section of the multi-sport club CSM Roman, which also includes a women's handball team. Founded in 1954 as Laminorul Roman, the team was dissolved in 2018 due to poor results. However, the football section was re-founded in 2021 and enrolled in Liga IV – Neamț County, the fourth tier of the Romanian football league system.

== History ==
CSM Roman was founded in 1954 as Laminorul Roman by the syndicate of Întreprinderea de Țevi Roman (lit. 'Roman Pipe Enterprises, currently Mittal Steel') and played for twenty years in the regional and county championships.

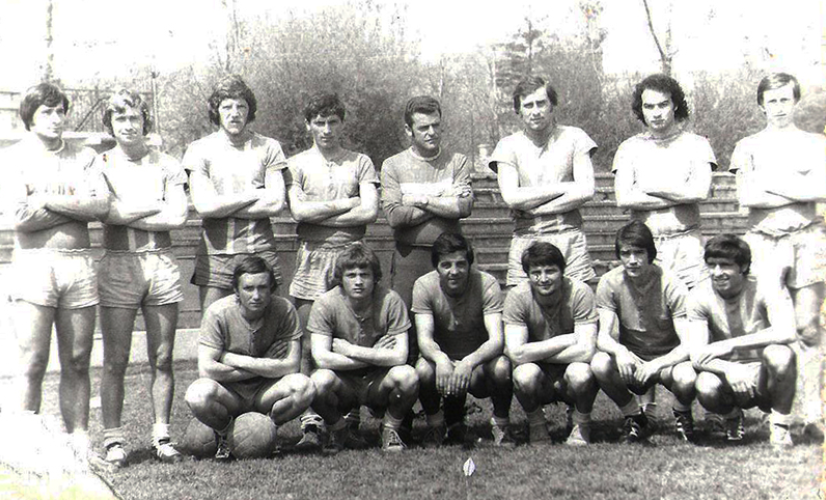
Laminorul squad in 1974

The team earned its first promotion to Divizia C at the end of the 1973–74 season, winning the Neamț County Championship and the promotion play-off against the Iași County Championship winner, Șoimii Iași (2–1 at Roman and 1–1 at Iași). The team consisted of the following players: A. Bălan, Niserciu (goalkeepers) – Musceleanu, C. Iamandi, Onu, Procopoaia, Ene, Ciocârlan, Tudosie, Mircea, Maticiuc, N. Iamandi, Dinu, Peisic, and Ivanov.

Țevarii played in Divizia C for sixteen consecutive years until the 1989–90 season, finishing 16th and suffering relegation to Divizia D – Neamț County. During this period, the club managed to finish as runner-up on four occasions.

The following season brought a quick return to the third tier. However, despite securing 6th place at the end of the 1991–92 season, relegation followed due to the restructuring of Divizia C, which allowed only the top four teams from each series to remain in the third division.

Laminorul won the next two seasons of the Neamț County Championship, each time missing out on promotion—first in 1992–93 against Rapid Miercurea Ciuc (0–4 away and 0–1 at Roman), and then in 1993–94 after matches against Mobila Iași (4–1 at home and 1–3 at Iași), finishing below the sixteen teams with the best aggregate results. For the pipefitters, two consecutive seasons followed, each ending in 2nd place behind Cimentul Bicaz.

After five seasons in the fourth tier, Laminorul secured the 1996–97 Divizia D – Neamț County title and earned promotion by defeating Metalul Botoșani, the winner of Divizia D – Botoșani County, 8–2 at Emil Alexandrescu Stadium in Iași. The squad, coached by Nicolae Zaharia, featured: Simionaș (46' Ionuț Nacu) - Costin, Claudiu Martin (40' Marius Tofan), Viorel Mocanu, Cristian Vizitiu - Corneliu Codreanu, Lucian Zaharia (82' Colobanea), Lucian Cozma, Gabriel Țapu - Bogdan Vizitiu, Ciprian Țigănuș.

Back-to-back promotions followed, with Laminorul winning Series I of Divizia C in the following season under two coaches: Nicolae Zaharia in the first half and Ioan Radu in the second, finishing 11 points ahead of Chimica Târnaveni.

In its first season in the second division, the team finished 5th in Series I, marking its best performance in history up to that point. A strong start to the following campaign resulted in an 8th-place finish at the end of the championship.

Daniel Iftodi became player-coach in July 2006, leading the team to 13th place in the 2006–07 Liga III season. His assistant, Dan Dosan, took over for the following season and guided the club to 15th place, narrowly avoiding relegation.

In July 2008, Costel Enache was appointed as head coach and remained in charge for three seasons, securing finishes of 6th in 2008–09 and 3rd in both 2009–10 and 2010–11. During this period, the club changed its name in the summer of 2009 from Laminorul Roman to Petrotub Roman.

Petrotub finished 3rd in the 2011–12 Liga III season under the leadership of Ovidiu Marc. In the following season, Gheorghe Poenaru guided the team to a 7th-place finish in 2012–13. Vasile Avădanei then took charge and secured 3rd place in the regular season of 2013–14 before achieving 2nd place in the promotion play-offs. This was followed by a 5th-place finish in 2014–15 season. Avădanei left after the first part of the 2015–16 season and was replaced by Gabriel Țapu, who led the team to a 4th-place finish.

In the summer of 2016, the club underwent another name change, becoming CSM Roman. The 2017–18 season saw them finish 3rd in Liga III. However, on 31 October 2018, CSM Roman announced its withdrawal from the league due to poor results.

The football section was re-founded in 2021 and enrolled in Liga IV – Neamț County.

== Honours ==
Liga III

- Winners (1): 1997–98
- Runners-up (7): 1975–76, 1976–77, 1977–78, 1981–82, 2013–14

Liga IV – Neamț County

- Winners (5): 1973–74, 1990–91, 1992–93, 1993–94, 1996–97
- Runners-up (3): 1972–73, 1994–95, 1995–96

== Former managers ==
- (Romania) Gheorghe Bărbulescu (1960–1961)
- (Romania) Gheorghe Dungu (1980–1982)
- (Romania) Nicolae Zaharia (1996–1998)
- (Romania) Ioan Radu (1998–2002)
- (Romania) Leonida Nedelcu (2002)
- (Romania) Gheorghe Poenaru (2003–2005)
- (Romania) Daniel Iftodi (2006–2007)
- (Romania) Dan Dosan (2007–2008)
- (Romania) Costel Enache (2008–2011)
- (Romania) Ovidiu Marc (2011–2012)
- (Romania) Gheorghe Poenaru (2012–2013)
- (Romania) Vasile Avădanei (2013–2015)
- (Romania) Gabriel Țapu (2016–2018)
- (Romania) Ion Bocu
- (Romania) Ioan Zăloagă

== League history ==
Season	Tier	Division	Place	Notes	Cupa României
2024–25	4	Liga IV (NT)	1st (C)		
2022–23	4	Liga IV (NT)	3rd		
2021–22	4	Liga IV (NT)	8th		
2018–21	Not active at seniors level				
2017–18	3	Liga III (Seria I)	4th	Disbanded	
2016–17	3	Liga III (Seria I)	6th		
2015–16	3	Liga III (Seria I)	4th		
2014–15	3	Liga III (Seria I)	5th		
2013–14	3	Liga III (Seria I)	2nd		
2012–13	3	Liga III (Seria I)	7th		
2011–12	3	Liga III (Seria I)	3rd		
2010–11	3	Liga III (Seria I)	3rd		
2009–10	3	Liga III (Seria I)	3rd		
2008–09	3	Liga III (Seria I)	6th		
2007–08	3	Liga III (Seria I)	15th		
2006–07	3	Divizia C (Seria I)	13th		
2005–06	2	Divizia B (Seria I)	14th	Relegated	
2004–05	2	Divizia B (Seria I)	13th		
2003–04	2	Divizia B (Seria I)	5th		
2002–03	3	Divizia C (Seria I)	3rd	Promoted	
2001–02	2	Divizia B (Seria I)	15th	Relegated	
2000–01	2	Divizia B (Seria I)	4th		
1999–00	2	Divizia B (Seria I)	8th		
1998–99	2	Divizia B (Seria I)	5th		
1997–98	3	Divizia C (Seria I)	1st (C)	Promoted	

Season	Tier	Division	Place	Notes	Cupa României
1996–97	4	Divizia D (NT)	1st (C)	Promoted	
1995–96	4	Divizia D (NT)	2nd		
1994–95	4	Divizia D (NT)	2nd		
1993–94	4	Divizia D (NT)	1st (C)		
1992–93	4	Divizia D (NT)	1st (C)		
1991–92	3	Divizia C (Seria II)	6th	Relegated	
1990–91	4	Divizia D (NT)	1st (C)	Promoted	
1989–90	3	Divizia C (Seria XII)	16th	Relegated	
1988–89	3	Divizia C (Seria I)	12th		
1987–88	3	Divizia C (Seria II)	13th		
1986–87	3	Divizia C (Seria II)	12th		
1985–86	3	Divizia C (Seria I)	6th		
1984–85	3	Divizia C (Seria II)	6th		
1983–84	3	Divizia C (Seria I)	3rd		
1982–83	3	Divizia C (Seria I)	6th		
1981–82	3	Divizia C (Seria II)	2nd		
1980–81	3	Divizia C (Seria I)	3rd		
1979–80	3	Divizia C (Seria I)	6th		
1978–79	3	Divizia C (Seria I)	12th		
1977–78	3	Divizia C (Seria I)	2nd		
1976–77	3	Divizia C (Seria I)	2nd		
1975–76	3	Divizia C (Seria I)	2nd		
1974–75	3	Divizia C (Seria I)	4th		
1973–74	4	County Championship (NT)	1st (C)	Promoted	
