= Bogdan Ionuț Miron =

Romanian footballer

Bogdan Miron
Personal information
- Full name: Bogdan Ionuț Miron
- Date of birth: 2 January 1982 (age 44)
- Place of birth: Bacău, Romania
- Height: 1.85 m (6 ft 1 in)
- Position: Goalkeeper

Senior career*
Years	Team	Apps	(Gls)
1999–2004	Midia Năvodari	56	(0)
2004–2006	Petrolul Ploiești	44	(0)
2005	→ Jiul Petroșani (loan)	6	(0)
2006–2008	FC Transylvania	68	(0)
2008	Știința Bacău	16	(0)
2009–2011	Astra Ploiești	39	(0)
2011–2012	Voința Sibiu	24	(0)
2012–2013	Ceahlăul Piatra Neamț	21	(0)
2013	CSMS Iași	14	(0)
2014	Dunărea Galați	9	(0)
2014	CSM Pașcani	?	(?)
2015–2018	SC Bacău	26	(0)
2018–2019	Hușana Huși	?	(?)
2020	Aerostar Bacău	?	(?)
Total		323	(0)

Managerial career
- 2016–2018: SC Bacău (GK coach)
- 2018–2019: Hușana Huși (GK coach)
- 2021–2022: CSM Adjud
- 2022–2024: CSM Bacău (GK coach)
- 2024–: CSM Olimpia Satu Mare
- * Club domestic league appearances and goals as of 08:23, 17 October 2023 (UTC)

Bogdan Ionuț Miron (born 2 January 1982) is a former Romanian footballer who played as a goalkeeper. He made his Liga I debut in a 0–0 draw away to Politehnica Timișoara in September 2009, a performance for which he was named man of the match.

== Honours ==
CSMS Iași

- Liga II: 2013–14

Gauss Bacău

- Liga IV – Bacău County: 2017–18

Hușana Huși

- Liga IV – Vaslui County: 2018–19

Aerostar Bacău

- Liga III: 2019–20
