= 1974–75 Divizia B =

Divizia B
- Season: 1974–75
- Promoted: SC Bacău; Rapid București; Bihor Oradea
- Relegated: Foresta Fălticeni; Flacăra Moreni; Minerul Baia Sprie; Chimia Brăila; Metalul Turnu Severin; Minerul Anina; Oțelul Galați; Oltul Sfântu Gheorghe; Vulturii Textila Lugoj; Relonul Săvinești; CSU Brașov; Metalul Aiud

The 1974–75 Divizia B was the 35th season of the second tier of the Romanian football league system.

The format has been maintained to three series, each of them having 18 teams. At the end of the season the winners of the series promoted to Divizia A and the last four places from each series relegated to Divizia C.

== Team changes ==
=== To Divizia B ===
Promoted from Divizia C

- Foresta Fălticeni
- Relonul Săvinești
- Unirea Focșani
- Chimia Brăila
- Voința București
- Automatica Alexandria
- Victoria Călan
- Minerul Moldova Nouă
- Metalul Aiud
- Minerul Baia Sprie
- Oltul Sfântu Gheorghe
- CSU Brașov

Relegated from Divizia A

- Rapid București
- SC Bacău
- Petrolul Ploiești

=== From Divizia B ===
Relegated to Divizia C

- Viitorul Vaslui
- Minerul Motru
- Olimpia Oradea
- Caraimanul Bușteni
- Carpați Brașov
- Minerul Cavnic
- Petrolul Moinești
- Nitramonia Făgăraș
- Textila Odorheiu Secuiesc
- Victoria Roman
- Dunărea Giurgiu
- Gloria Bistrița

Promoted to Divizia A

- FC Galați
- Chimia Râmnicu Vâlcea
- Olimpia Satu Mare

=== Renamed teams ===
Unirea Arad was renamed as Rapid Arad.

== League tables ==
=== Serie I ===
| Pos | Team | Pld | W | D | L | GF | GA | GD | Pts | Promotion or relegation |
|---|---|---|---|---|---|---|---|---|---|---|
| 1 | SC Bacău (C, P) | 34 | 19 | 10 | 5 | 82 | 46 | +36 | 48 | Promotion to Divizia A |
| 2 | Progresul Brăila | 34 | 18 | 7 | 9 | 71 | 43 | +28 | 43 | |
| 3 | Gloria Buzău | 34 | 17 | 6 | 11 | 50 | 36 | +14 | 40 | |
| 4 | Ceahlăul Piatra Neamț | 34 | 16 | 7 | 11 | 46 | 35 | +11 | 39 | |
| 5 | Petrolul Ploiești | 34 | 15 | 6 | 13 | 46 | 43 | +3 | 36 | |
| 6 | Metalul Plopeni | 34 | 14 | 8 | 12 | 37 | 35 | +2 | 36 | |
| 7 | Constructorul Galați | 34 | 12 | 11 | 11 | 49 | 41 | +8 | 35 | |
| 8 | Celuloza Călărași | 34 | 15 | 4 | 15 | 45 | 48 | −3 | 34 | |
| 9 | Unirea Focșani | 34 | 13 | 8 | 13 | 38 | 48 | −10 | 34 | |
| 10 | CSU Galați | 34 | 14 | 5 | 15 | 56 | 44 | +12 | 33 | |
| 11 | CFR Pașcani | 34 | 15 | 3 | 16 | 47 | 48 | −1 | 33 | |
| 12 | Tulcea | 34 | 12 | 9 | 13 | 34 | 38 | −4 | 33 | |
| 13 | CSM Suceava | 34 | 14 | 5 | 15 | 45 | 54 | −9 | 33 | |
| 14 | Știința Bacău | 34 | 12 | 7 | 15 | 39 | 31 | +8 | 31 | |
| 15 | Foresta Fălticeni (R) | 34 | 15 | 1 | 18 | 40 | 64 | −24 | 31 | Relegation to Divizia C |
| 16 | Chimia Brăila (R) | 34 | 11 | 8 | 15 | 37 | 48 | −11 | 30 | Relegation to Divizia C |
| 17 | Oțelul Galați (R) | 34 | 9 | 6 | 19 | 41 | 56 | −15 | 24 | Relegation to Divizia C |
| 18 | Relonul Săvinești (R) | 34 | 9 | 1 | 24 | 34 | 79 | −45 | 19 | Relegation to Divizia C |

Source: romaniansoccer.ro
Rules for classification: 1) Points; 2) Goal difference; 3) Goals scored; 4) Head-to-head points; 5) Head-to-head goal difference; 6) Head-to-head goals scored; 7) Head-to-head away goals scored.
(C) Champions; (P) Promoted; (R) Relegated

=== Serie II ===
| Pos | Team | Pld | W | D | L | GF | GA | GD | Pts | |
|---|---|---|---|---|---|---|---|---|---|---|
| 1 | Rapid București (C, P) | 34 | 21 | 8 | 5 | 56 | 19 | +37 | 50 | Qualification to Cup Winners' Cup first round |
| 2 | Progresul București | 34 | 17 | 10 | 7 | 49 | 32 | +17 | 44 | |
| 3 | CS Târgoviște | 34 | 17 | 7 | 10 | 49 | 34 | +15 | 41 | |
| 4 | Metalul București | 34 | 15 | 8 | 11 | 46 | 31 | +15 | 38 | |
| 5 | Electroputere Craiova | 34 | 16 | 5 | 13 | 51 | 42 | +9 | 37 | |
| 6 | Gaz Metan Mediaș | 34 | 15 | 5 | 14 | 47 | 48 | −1 | 35 | |
| 7 | Autobuzul București | 34 | 13 | 8 | 13 | 42 | 36 | +6 | 34 | |
| 8 | Dinamo Slatina | 34 | 15 | 4 | 15 | 48 | 45 | +3 | 34 | |
| 9 | SN Oltenița | 34 | 14 | 6 | 14 | 29 | 38 | −9 | 34 | |
| 10 | Voința București | 34 | 12 | 9 | 13 | 35 | 39 | −4 | 33 | |
| 11 | Tractorul Brașov | 34 | 13 | 6 | 15 | 46 | 48 | −2 | 32 | |
| 12 | Metrom Brașov | 34 | 11 | 10 | 13 | 32 | 34 | −2 | 32 | |
| 13 | Metalul Mija | 34 | 13 | 6 | 15 | 32 | 42 | −10 | 32 | |
| 14 | Automatica Alexandria (Note: Automatica Alexandria won, with 1–0, the relegation play-off against Flacăra Moreni.) | 34 | 11 | 9 | 14 | 33 | 34 | −1 | 31 | |
| 15 | Flacăra Moreni (R) | 34 | 12 | 7 | 15 | 47 | 47 | 0 | 31 | Relegation to Divizia C |
| 16 | Metalul Turnu Severin (R) | 34 | 9 | 7 | 18 | 34 | 53 | −19 | 25 | Relegation to Divizia C |
| 17 | Oltul Sfântu Gheorghe (R) | 34 | 10 | 5 | 19 | 37 | 68 | −31 | 25 | Relegation to Divizia C |
| 18 | CSU Brașov (R) | 34 | 8 | 8 | 18 | 37 | 60 | −23 | 24 | Relegation to Divizia C |

Source: romaniansoccer.ro
Rules for classification: 1) Points; 2) Goal difference; 3) Goals scored; 4) Head-to-head points; 5) Head-to-head goal difference; 6) Head-to-head goals scored; 7) Head-to-head away goals scored.
(C) Champions; (P) Promoted; (R) Relegated

=== Serie III ===
| Pos | Team | Pld | W | D | L | GF | GA | GD | Pts | Promotion or relegation |
|---|---|---|---|---|---|---|---|---|---|---|
| 1 | Bihor Oradea (C, P) | 34 | 22 | 6 | 6 | 63 | 26 | +37 | 50 | Promotion to Divizia A |
| 2 | Șoimii Sibiu | 34 | 19 | 5 | 10 | 62 | 28 | +34 | 43 | |
| 3 | Minerul Baia Mare | 34 | 16 | 9 | 9 | 53 | 31 | +22 | 41 | |
| 4 | Corvinul Hunedoara | 34 | 17 | 3 | 14 | 60 | 40 | +20 | 37 | |
| 5 | Metalurgistul Cugir | 34 | 15 | 6 | 13 | 42 | 39 | +3 | 36 | |
| 6 | IS Câmpia Turzii | 34 | 16 | 3 | 15 | 50 | 51 | −1 | 35 | |
| 7 | Mureșul Deva | 34 | 15 | 5 | 14 | 54 | 56 | −2 | 35 | |
| 8 | CFR Timișoara | 34 | 15 | 3 | 16 | 58 | 53 | +5 | 33 | |
| 9 | UM Timișoara | 34 | 15 | 3 | 16 | 49 | 44 | +5 | 33 | |
| 10 | Arieșul Turda | 34 | 16 | 1 | 17 | 45 | 43 | +2 | 33 | |
| 11 | Minerul Moldova Nouă | 34 | 13 | 7 | 14 | 35 | 42 | −7 | 33 | |
| 12 | Victoria Călan | 34 | 15 | 3 | 16 | 39 | 69 | −30 | 33 | |
| 13 | Rapid Arad | 34 | 15 | 2 | 17 | 46 | 46 | 0 | 32 | |
| 14 | Victoria Carei | 34 | 15 | 2 | 17 | 49 | 52 | −3 | 32 | |
| 15 | Minerul Baia Sprie (R) | 34 | 13 | 5 | 16 | 46 | 49 | −3 | 31 | Relegation to Divizia C |
| 16 | Minerul Anina (R) | 34 | 13 | 3 | 18 | 39 | 64 | −25 | 29 | Relegation to Divizia C |
| 17 | Vulturii Textila Lugoj (R) | 34 | 10 | 7 | 17 | 40 | 52 | −12 | 27 | Relegation to Divizia C |
| 18 | Metalul Aiud (R) | 34 | 6 | 7 | 21 | 28 | 73 | −45 | 19 | Relegation to Divizia C |

Source: romaniansoccer.ro
Rules for classification: 1) Points; 2) Goal difference; 3) Goals scored; 4) Head-to-head points; 5) Head-to-head goal difference; 6) Head-to-head goals scored; 7) Head-to-head away goals scored.
(C) Champions; (P) Promoted; (R) Relegated

== See also ==
- 1974–75 Divizia A
- 1974–75 Divizia C
- 1974–75 County Championship
- 1974–75 Cupa României
