= CSM Hușana Huși =

Romanian football club

Hușana Huși
- Full name: Club Sportiv Municipal; Hușana Huși
- Nicknames: Hușenii (The People from Huși); Alb-Albaștrii (The White and Blues); Echipa dintre vii (The Team Between the Vineyards)
- Short name: Hușana
- Founded: 1968; 58 years ago 2016; 10 years ago (refounded)
- Ground: Municipal
- Capacity: 5,000
- Owner: Huși Municipality
- Chairman: Mihai Cehan
- Manager: Cătălin Nicolau
- League: Liga IV
- 2025–26: Liga IV, Vaslui County, 1st of 12
- Website: https://csmhusana.ro/
Home colours	Away colours

Club Sportiv Municipal Hușana Huși, commonly known as Hușana Huși or simply as Hușana, is a Romanian football club based in Huși, Vaslui County, founded in 1968 and currently playing only in the youth competitions.

Hușana Huși was founded in 1968 and named after the local shoe factory, Hușana. Over time the club mainly operated besides a local factory, hence the frequent change of name, from Hușana to Steaua Mecanica, from Metalul to FCM (during the 2000s, when the municipality became the owner) and back to Hușana in the 2010s.

The club is based in Huși, a town well known in Romania for its wine production, hence one of the club's nicknames as "the Team Between the Vineyards". Despite that, Huși, as well as Vaslui County have a delicate financial situation, hence the inconsistent results of the team, over the years. Hușana was, at his best, a meteoric member of Divizia C, especially during the 1970s and 1980s, subsequently the team evolving mainly in the Liga IV with only a few seasons spent in the third tier, during the early 1990s and middle 2000s.

== History ==
=== First years and the ascension (1968–1981) ===
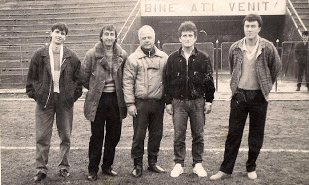
From left to right: Nicu Marian, Ioan Tugulan, Haralambie Eftimie (head coach), Ioan Tibulca and Gheorghe Lupu.

Hușana Huși was founded in 1968 and named after the local shoe factory, Hușana. First squad of "the white and blues" was composed exclusively from local players such as Zimțescu brothers, Iacob, Marian, Bujder, Perju, Iolea, Vrabie, Sapcă, Butucea or Dulhac. These were players who played only for hobby, but their dedication and the quality of the played football resulted in a stadium full of supporters at every home match. The first great performance was obtained at the end of the 1972–73 season, when the team was ranked first and promoted to Divizia C, for the first time in its short history. This squad was coached by Dumitru Condurache (in the first part of the season) and Cucu Oancea (in the second part) and included the following players: Pavlov, Tiorok, Virgil Mazilu, Nicu Marian, Dumitru Bujder, Ștefan Hondru Cosug, Ilie Olaru, Ticu Pătrașcu, Costică Zota, Mihai Titi, Florin Zane, Valentin Romilă, Sterică Popa, Străoanu, Gheorghe Sasu, Adrian Mirciu, Viorel Moraru, Gheorghe Morariu and Ioan Iacob.

This squad of Hușana and its style of football captivated the residents of Huși in the 1970s. After promotion, the squad from Vaslui County made a great first impression and despite its limited funding managed to achieve a deserved 8th place, at the end of the 1973–74 Divizia C season. In the following two seasons, the club managed to avoid relegation and was ranked 8th (1974–75) and 9th (1975–76) out of 16. Hușana relegated back in the fourth tier at the end of the 1976–77 season, when it was ranked only 15th out of 16th. After a single season spent in the Vaslui County Championship, Hușana promoted again, being distributed in the second series, alongside teams such as Energia Onești, Letea Bacău, Partizanul Bacău, CSM Borzești, Cimentul Bicaz, Rulmentul Bârlad or Cetatea Târgu Neamț, among others. Hușana spent, this time, only two seasons and a half in the Divizia C, opting to withdraw at the half of the 1980–81 season, due to financial problems.

=== Steaua Mecanica, the local pride (1981–2000) ===
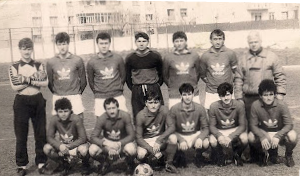
Steaua Mecanica squad in the 1989–90 season.

In the summer of 1981, Metalul factory bought the football club and changed its name from Hușana to Metalul, receiving surprisingly a place in the Divizia C, but succumbing again after half of the season, due to financial shortcomings. In the next three years Metalul do not managed to promote again and at Huși a new management was proposed. Metalul Huși was renamed as Steaua Mecanic Huși, in 1984 and after only one season it managed to promote in the Divizia C. After promotion, Steaua Mecanica managed to remain at this level for six seasons, period considered as the most fruitful in the history of the football from Huși. In this period, the club registered its best performances, was the second most important team of the county and in the town there were already aspirations for a future debut in the Divizia B. Steaua Mecanica was ranked: 5th (1985–86), 4th (1986–87) and 3rd (1987–88, 1988–89, 1989–90).

The apogee of Steaua Mecanica golden generation was reached during the 1988–89 season, when besides a third consecutive ranking on the 3rd place, hușenii reached the Romanian Cup's round of 32, when they were eliminated by Divizia A side Flacăra Moreni, ranked 4th at that time. Until the round of 32, Steaua Mecanica won over Mecanica Vaslui (2–1), Viitorul Vaslui (4–0), FEPA '74 Bârlad (2–0) Progresul Braila (3–1) and Ceahlăul Piatra Neamț (3–1). In this period, Steaua Mecanica Huși was coached by Haralambie Eftimie, who was assisted by Alexandru Grigorescu and in the squad appeared players such as Iulian Smădu, Adrian State, Gheorghe Lupu, Ioan Iacob, Ioan Tugulan, Ioan Tibulca, Nicu Marian, Ivan, Stanciu, Tătaru, Botu, Bălan, Ungureanu, Răut, Matei, Cosma, Scărlătescu, Ursu and Ciobanu.

After 1990 Romanian Revolution, Steaua Mecanica spent only two more seasons at this level, then relegating at the end of the 1991–92 season, despite a rank in the middle of the table, 9th of 16. In this season was made a re-organization of the Romanian football league system, thus relegating more teams than in a normal season. After relegation, the club was renamed again, this time as Mecanica Huși and promoted back in the third tier at the end of 1995–96 season, but only to relegate a year later after a weak ranking, 18th of 18.

=== Troubled times (2000–present) ===
Period	Name
1968–1981	Hușana Huși
1981–1984	Metalul Huși
1984–1994	Steaua Mecanica Huși
1994–2000	Mecanica Huși
2000–2012	FCM Huși
2012–2016	*not active
2016–present	Hușana Huși

In the early 2000s, the club, financially supported by the Municipality of Huși and local businessmen, pass through a rebranding process and changed its name from Mecanica Huși to FCM Huși. FCM Huși bought the place of Mobila Iași, in the Divizia C, at the beginning of the 2003–04 season, then remained at this level for three seasons, but with no important results. In this period, the entire town was gathered around the team, and the supporters were constantly going to the stadium, as if going to church, it was already a tradition. FCM relegated again in 2006, basically due to financial problems and promoted again only in 2012, but withdrew in the first part of the season and was dissolved.

In the following years, the football legacy was continued by Pajura Huși, a private football club without any official connection with the old one. Pajura won Liga IV – Vaslui County at the end of the 2015–16 season, but missed the promotion, after losing, 2–7 on aggregate, the play-off disputed against Galați County champions, Avântul Valea Mărului. In the summer of 2016, the old club, Hușana Huși was re-founded, but only at youth level.

Next season Pajura was ranked only 4th and during the summer of 2017, the senior team was disbanded by the owner Mădălin Căciulă, who opted to continue the club's activity only at youth level.

In the same summer, Hușana, financially supported by the municipality, enrolled in the Liga IV and started a collaboration with Pajura, club which entered the business with its youth academy. After a 4th place, obtained at the end of the 2017–18 season, "the Team Between the Vineyards" won the league next season, when in the final it disposed of the more successful FC Vaslui and promoted in the Liga III, after 7 years of absence.

== Ground ==
Hușana Huși plays its home matches on Municipal Stadium, located in Huși, Vaslui County. The stadium was opened in the 1950s by the demolition of some vineyards belonging to a priest. Initially the arena had only a wood stand, but in time it suffered upgrades and renovations, the most recent was in the summer of 2019, after the promotion of the team in the Liga III.

Municipal Stadium has a capacity of 5,000 people and 1,500 on seats. The seats were fitted during the 2019 renovation, when the locker rooms were also renovated, as well as the front of the stadium and the spaces that exist under the stands.

== Support ==
Hușana has many supporters in Huși and especially in Vaslui County. The residents of Huși are well known for their dedication to the team and for the warm atmosphere created almost every time. The ultras group of Hușana are known as Ultras Huși-Brigada Dintre Vii.

=== Rivalries ===
The most important rivalry for Hușana Huși is the one against FC Vaslui, the most successful team in the county. The city of Vaslui had many teams over time, in the 1970s and 1980s, Viitorul Vaslui was also in the position of the bitter rival of Hușana. Another important rivalry is the one with Bucovina Rădăuți

== Honours ==
Liga IV – Vaslui County

- Winners (9): 1972–73, 1977–78, 1984–85, 1993–94, 1995–96, 2010–11, 2011–12, 2018–19, 2025–26
- Runners-up (2): 1969–70, 2009–10

Supercupa – Vaslui County

- Runners-up (1): 2018–19

=== Other performances ===
- Appearances in Liga III: 21
- Best finish in Liga III: 3rd (1987–88, 1988–89, 1989–90)
- Best finish in the Romanian Cup: Round of 32 (1989–90)

== Club officials ==
=== Board of directors ===
Role	Name
Owner	(Romania) Huși Municipality
President	(Romania) Mihai Cehan

=== Current technical staff ===
Role	Name
Manager	(Romania) Cătălin Nicolau
Assistant manager	(Romania) Marius Dulcianu
Goalkeeping coach	(Romania) Adrian Sîrbu

== League history ==
Season	Tier	Division	Place	Notes	Cupa României
2021–22	3	Liga III (Seria I)	3rd	Disbanded	Fourth Round
2020–21	3	Liga III (Seria I)	5th		Round of 32
2019–20	3	Liga III (Seria I)	12th		
2018–19	4	Liga IV (VS)	1st (C)	Promoted	
2012–13	3	Liga III (Seria I)	13th	Relegated	
2011–12	4	Liga IV (VS)	1st (C)	Promoted	
2010–11	4	Liga IV (VS)	1st (C)		
2005–06	3	Divizia C (Seria I)	11th	Relegated	

Season	Tier	Division	Place	Notes	Cupa României
2004–05	3	Divizia C (Seria I)	13th		
2003–04	3	Divizia C (Seria I)	8th		
1996–97	3	Divizia C (Seria I)	18th	Relegated	
1995–96	4	Divizia D (VS)	1st (C)	Promoted	
1991–92	3	Divizia C (Seria I)	9th	Relegated	Round of 32
1990–91	3	Divizia C (Seria II)	8th		
1989–90	3	Divizia C (Seria I)	3rd		
1988–89	3	Divizia C (Seria II)	3rd		

== Notable former players ==
- (Romania) Vasile Buhăescu
- (Romania) Dumitru Bujder
- (Romania) Geo Dulhac
- (Romania) Ioan Iacob
- (Romania) Gheorghe Lupu
- (Romania) Nicu Marian
- (Romania) Bogdan Miron
- (Romania) Viorel Moraru
- (Romania) Dumitru Perju
- (Romania) Valentin Romilă
- (Romania) Nicu Sapcă
- (Romania) Iulian Smădu
- (Romania) Adrian State
- (Romania) Ioan Tibulca
- (Romania) Ioan Tugulan
- (Romania) Lilian Vrabie
- (Romania) Ilie Olaru

== Notable former managers ==
- (Romania) Haralambie Eftimie (1985–1990)
- (Romania) Dumitru Condurache
- (Romania) Alexandru Grigorescu
- (Romania) Cucu Oancea
- (Romania) Lilian Vrabie
