= Stadionul Moldova =

Stadionul Moldova may refer to:

- Stadionul Moldova (Roman), a multi-use stadium in Roman, Moldavia, Romania
- Stadionul Moldova (Speia), a sports stadium in Speia, Moldova
