= Corneliu Codreanu (footballer) =

Romanian former football right back

Personal information
- Full name: Corneliu Ioan Codreanu
- Date of birth: 11 February 1977 (age 49)
- Place of birth: Roman, Romania
- Height: 1.70 m (5 ft 7 in)
- Position: Right back

Youth career
- Laminorul Roman

Senior career*
Years	Team	Apps	(Gls)
1997–2000	Laminorul Roman	78	(5)
2001–2006	FCM Bacău	102	(2)
2006–2007	UTA Arad	3	(0)
2008–2009	FCM Bacău	13	(0)
2008	→ Aerostar Bacău (loan)		
2009–2010	Botoşani	26	(0)
2010–2011	FCM Bacău	21	(2)
2011–2018	Unirea Mircești		
Total		243	(9)
- * Club domestic league appearances and goals as of 27 November 2019

Corneliu Ioan Codreanu (born 11 February 1977) is a Romanian former football right back. Codreanu played in his career mainly for FCM Bacău, but he also spent some periods at teams like: Laminorul Roman, UTA Arad, Aerostar Bacău or Botoşani. In 2011 Codreanu signed with Unirea Mircești, a lower leagues side from Iași County and automatically becoming an important name of the small team. He won afterwards two times Liga IV with Unirea, in 2015 and 2017, but lost in both times the Liga III promotion play-off, in 2015 against Voința Răucești and in 2017 against Oțelul Galați.

Codreanu was badly injured in the left knee in summer of 2003. He was operated in May 2004 at Leverkusen and was out till the end of the year. The German doctor said that the operation made by Romanian doctors was made in mockery.
