= Stadionul Municipal (Huși) =

Stadium in Romania

- Interactive map of Stadionul Municipal
- Address: Aleea Stadionului
- Location: Huși, Romania
- Coordinates: 46°40′30″N 28°03′09″E
- Owner: Municipality of Huși
- Operator: Hușana Huși
- Capacity: 5,000 (1,500 seated)
- Surface: Grass

Construction
- Opened: 1950s
- Renovated: 1970s, 2000, 2019

Tenants
- Hușana Huși (1968–2012), (2016–Present); Pajura Huși (2012–2017)

Stadionul Municipal is a multi-purpose stadium in Huși, Romania. It is currently used mostly for football matches and is the home ground of Hușana Huși. The stadium holds about 5,000 people and have 1,500 seats.

The stadium was opened in the 1950s by the demolition of some vineyards belonging to a priest. Initially the arena had only a wood stand, but in time it suffered upgrades and renovations, the most recent was in the summer of 2019, after the promotion of the team in the Liga III. The seats were also fitted during the 2019 renovation, when the locker rooms were also renovated, as well as the front of the stadium and the spaces that exist under the stands.
