= 1973–74 Divizia C =

Third tier Romanian football league

Divizia C
- Season: 1973–74

The 1973–74 Divizia C was the 18th season of Liga III, the third tier of the Romanian football league system.

== Team changes ==
=== To Divizia C ===
Relegated from Divizia B

- —

Promoted from County Championship

- Metalul Rădăuți
- Constructorul Iași
- Constructorul Botoșani
- Victoria PTTR Botoșani
- Energia Gheorghe Gheorghiu-Dej
- Hușana Huși
- Bradul Roznov
- Foresta Gugești
- Luceafărul Focșani
- Avântul Măneciu
- Portul Brăila
- Carpați Nehoiu
- Rapid Fetești
- Tehnometal Galați
- Voința Constanța
- Constructorul Tulcea
- Arrubium Măcin
- Triumf București
- IOR București
- Dinamo Slobozia
- Argeșul Mihăilești
- Vulturii Câmpulung
- Cetatea Turnu Măgurele
- Cimentul Fieni
- Aro Câmpulung
- FOB Balș
- Metalurgistul Sadu
- CFR Craiova
- Progresul Strehaia
- CIL Drobeta Turnu Severin
- Petrolul Țicleni
- Dacia Orăștie
- Unirea Sânnicolau Mare
- CFR Caransebeș
- Cimentul Turda
- Constructorul Alba Iulia
- Crișana Sebiș
- Oașul Negrești
- Minerul Șuncuiuș
- Victoria Zalău
- Măgura Șimleu Silvaniei
- Unirea Sfântu Gheorghe
- Miercurea Ciuc
- Avântul Reghin
- Minerul Rodna
- Hebe Sângeorz-Băi
- Precizia Săcele
- Hidroenergia Râmnicu Vâlcea
- Carpați Mârșa

=== From Divizia C ===
Promoted to Divizia B

- CSM Suceava
- Viitorul Vaslui
- Caraimanul Bușteni
- Constructorul Galați
- Celuloza Călărași
- Flacăra Moreni
- Minerul Motru
- Mureșul Deva
- Arieșul Turda
- Victoria Carei
- Gaz Metan Mediaș
- Tractorul Brașov
- Victoria Roman
- Petrolul Moinești
- Metalul Mija
- Oțelul Galați
- Autobuzul București
- Oltul Slatina
- Vulturii Textila Lugoj
- UM Timișoara
- IS Câmpia Turzii
- Minerul Cavnic
- Textila Odorheiu Secuiesc
- Carpați Brașov

Relegated to County Championship

- —

=== Renamed teams ===
Textila Botoșani was renamed as CS Botoșani.

Străduința Suceava was renamed as Sportul Muncitoresc Suceava.

Minobrad Vatra Dornei was renamed as Dorna Vatra Dornei.

CFR Roșiori was renamed as ROVA Roșiori.

Minerul Rovinari was renamed as Energia Rovinari.

Independența Cisnădie was renamed as Textila Cisnădie.

Hidroenergia Râmnicu Vâlcea was renamed as Chimistul Râmnicu Vâlcea.

Minerul Bocșa Montană merged with Metalul Bocșa to form AS Bocșa

=== Other changes ===
Constructorul Vaslui took the place of Unirea Tricolor Bârlad.

CFR Arad and Vagonul Arad merged, the new entity was named Unirea Arad and took the place of first one in Divizia B.

Strungul Arad took the place of Vagonul Arad in Divizia C due to the merge between CFR Arad and Vagonul Arad.

Minerul Băița took the place of Constructorul Baia Mare in Divizia C.

Pandurii Târgu Jiu and Cimentul Târgu Jiu merged, the first one absorbed the second one and was renamed as Cimentul Târgu Jiu.

== League tables ==
=== Seria I ===
Pos	Team	Pld	W	D	L	GF	GA	GD	Pts	Promotion or relegation
1	Foresta Fălticeni (C, P)	28	17	6	5	54	19	+35	40	Promotion to Divizia B
2	ASA Câmpulung Moldovenesc	28	16	6	6	53	21	+32	38	
3	Unirea Iași	28	15	7	6	43	22	+21	37	
4	CS Botoșani	28	13	8	7	46	33	+13	34	
5	Metalul Rădăuți	28	13	6	9	49	43	+6	32	
6	Minerul Gura Humorului	28	12	6	10	28	32	−4	30	
7	Danubiana Roman	28	9	10	9	32	28	+4	28	
8	Sportul Muncitoresc Suceava	28	8	9	11	29	33	−4	25	
9	Constructorul Iași	28	9	7	12	24	32	−8	25	
10	Cristalul Dorohoi	28	10	4	14	37	46	−9	24	
11	Nicolina Iași	28	9	6	13	34	48	−14	24	
12	Constructorul Botoșani	28	10	3	15	39	46	−7	23	
13	Dorna Vatra Dornei	28	8	6	14	33	44	−11	22	
14	Avântul Frasin	28	6	8	14	27	45	−18	20	
15	Victoria PTTR Botoșani (R)	28	6	6	16	30	66	−36	18	Relegation to County Championship
16	ITA Iași (R)	0	0	0	0	0	0	0	0	Expelled

Source: romaniansoccer.ro
(C) Champions; (P) Promoted; (R) Relegated

=== Seria II ===
Pos	Team	Pld	W	D	L	GF	GA	GD	Pts	Promotion or relegation
1	Relonul Săvinești (C, P)	30	17	8	5	66	21	+45	42	Promotion to Divizia B
2	Trotușul Gheorghe Gheorghiu-Dej	30	12	12	6	42	27	+15	36	
3	Energia Gheorghe Gheorghiu-Dej	30	13	8	9	35	24	+11	34	
4	Letea Bacău	30	12	8	10	44	34	+10	32	
5	Constructorul Gheorghe Gheorghiu-Dej	30	11	9	10	37	28	+9	31	
6	URA Tecuci	30	13	5	12	40	32	+8	31	
7	Rulmentul Bârlad	30	11	9	10	31	34	−3	31	
8	Hușana Huși	30	13	5	12	33	47	−14	31	
9	Cimentul Bicaz	30	10	10	10	48	36	+12	30	
10	Textila Buhuși	30	11	8	11	42	32	+10	30	
11	Minerul Comănești	30	14	2	14	41	45	−4	30	
12	Constructorul Vaslui	30	11	6	13	36	51	−15	28	
13	Oituz Târgu Ocna	30	10	6	14	25	38	−13	26	
14	Bradul Roznov	30	11	4	15	35	53	−18	26	
15	Foresta Gugești (R)	30	9	6	15	41	46	−5	24	Relegation to County Championship
16	Locomotiva Adjud (R)	30	5	8	17	21	69	−48	18	Relegation to County Championship

Source: romaniansoccer.ro
(C) Champions; (P) Promoted; (R) Relegated

=== Seria III ===
Pos	Team	Pld	W	D	L	GF	GA	GD	Pts	Promotion or relegation
1	Unirea Focșani (C, P)	30	18	9	3	75	35	+40	45	Promotion to Divizia B
2	Poiana Câmpina	30	17	7	6	55	24	+31	41	
3	IRA Câmpina	30	14	6	10	48	23	+25	34	
4	Petrolistul Boldești	30	14	4	12	41	32	+9	32	
5	Petrolul Berca	30	15	2	13	52	65	−13	32	
6	Carpați Sinaia	30	14	3	13	51	38	+13	31	
7	Victoria Florești	30	15	1	14	45	36	+9	31	
8	Chimia Brazi	30	12	6	12	41	33	+8	30	
9	Olimpia Râmnicu Sărat	30	13	4	13	37	46	−9	30	
10	Prahova Ploiești	30	12	5	13	44	43	+1	29	
11	Chimia Buzău	30	11	6	13	32	44	−12	28	
12	Luceafărul Focșani	30	9	8	13	40	51	−11	26	
13	Avântul Măneciu	30	11	4	15	38	54	−16	26	
14	Comerțul Brăila	30	9	6	15	27	51	−24	24	
15	Portul Brăila (R)	30	9	5	16	23	43	−20	23	Relegation to County Championship
16	Carpați Nehoiu (R)	30	6	6	18	34	65	−31	18	Relegation to County Championship

Source: romaniansoccer.ro
(C) Champions; (P) Promoted; (R) Relegated

=== Seria IV ===
Pos	Team	Pld	W	D	L	GF	GA	GD	Pts	Promotion or relegation
1	Chimia Brăila (C, P)	30	23	3	4	51	10	+41	49	Promotion to Divizia B
2	Electrica Constanța	30	17	9	4	44	21	+23	43	
3	Portul Constanța	30	18	4	8	54	28	+26	40	
4	Dunărea Tulcea	30	16	6	8	46	28	+18	38	
5	Marina Mangalia	30	15	7	8	39	24	+15	37	
6	Ancora Galați	30	11	10	9	35	27	+8	32	
7	Viitorul Brăila	30	13	4	13	40	32	+8	30	
8	IMU Medgidia	30	12	6	12	32	24	+8	30	
9	Cimentul Medgidia	30	13	2	15	43	34	+9	28	
10	Rapid Fetești	30	10	7	13	39	42	−3	27	
11	Tehnometal Galați	30	9	8	13	35	42	−7	26	
12	Știința Constanța	30	10	4	16	35	36	−1	24	
13	Granitul Babadag	30	11	2	17	32	43	−11	24	
14	Voința Constanța	30	6	6	18	31	64	−33	18	
15	Constructorul Tulcea (R)	30	6	6	18	23	61	−38	18	Relegation to County Championship
16	Arrubium Măcin (R)	30	5	6	19	28	91	−63	16	Relegation to County Championship

Source: romaniansoccer.ro
(C) Champions; (P) Promoted; (R) Relegated

=== Seria V ===
Pos	Team	Pld	W	D	L	GF	GA	GD	Pts	Promotion or relegation
1	Voința București (C, P)	30	21	4	5	70	24	+46	46	Promotion to Divizia B
2	Triumf București	30	19	7	4	59	23	+36	45	
3	TMB București	30	15	10	5	54	29	+25	40	
4	Olimpia Giurgiu	30	16	6	8	49	35	+14	38	
5	Tehnometal București	30	13	8	9	40	36	+4	34	
6	Sirena București	30	12	8	10	51	36	+15	32	
7	Flacăra Roșie București	30	9	13	8	36	38	−2	31	
8	Azotul Slobozia	30	12	6	12	43	41	+2	30	
9	Unirea Tricolor București	30	10	9	11	39	31	+8	29	
10	Electronica Obor București	30	11	7	12	37	43	−6	29	
11	IOR București	30	10	8	12	35	33	+2	28	
12	Șoimii Tarom București	30	9	8	13	48	47	+1	26	
13	Laromet București	30	7	7	16	30	48	−18	21	
14	Dinamo Slobozia	30	7	7	16	30	56	−26	21	
15	Argeșul Mihăilești (R)	30	7	3	20	27	81	−54	17	Relegation to County Championship
16	Sportul Ciorogârla (R)	30	3	7	20	28	75	−47	13	Relegation to County Championship

Source: romaniansoccer.ro
(C) Champions; (P) Promoted; (R) Relegated

=== Seria VI ===
Pos	Team	Pld	W	D	L	GF	GA	GD	Pts	Promotion or relegation
1	Automatica Alexandria (C, P)	30	15	9	6	38	27	+11	39	Promotion to Divizia B
2	Chimia Turnu Măgurele	30	16	6	8	64	34	+30	38	
3	Rova Roșiori	30	15	5	10	43	32	+11	35	
4	Recolta Stoicănești	30	12	8	10	45	44	+1	32	
5	Dacia Pitești	30	11	9	10	48	38	+10	31	
6	Vulturii Câmpulung	30	12	7	11	38	38	0	31	
7	Răsăritul Caracal	30	12	6	12	45	32	+13	30	
8	Chimia Găești	30	11	8	11	41	48	−7	30	
9	Cetatea Turnu Măgurele	30	11	7	12	29	42	−13	29	
10	Petrolul Târgoviște	30	10	8	12	30	33	−3	28	
11	Progresul Corabia	30	11	5	14	51	43	+8	27	
12	Textilistul Pitești	30	10	7	13	35	38	−3	27	
13	Unirea Drăgășani	30	11	5	14	36	51	−15	27	
14	Cimentul Fieni	30	9	9	12	42	54	−12	27	
15	Aro Câmpulung (R)	30	9	8	13	35	45	−10	26	Relegation to County Championship
16	Petrolul Videle (R)	30	8	7	15	25	46	−21	23	Relegation to County Championship

Source: romaniansoccer.ro
(C) Champions; (P) Promoted; (R) Relegated

=== Seria VII ===
Pos	Team	Pld	W	D	L	GF	GA	GD	Pts	Promotion or relegation
1	Victoria Călan (C, P)	30	18	5	7	50	24	+26	41	Promotion to Divizia B
2	Minerul Lupeni	30	17	6	7	55	27	+28	40	
3	Dunărea Calafat	30	17	4	9	41	25	+16	38	
4	Energia Rovinari	30	15	7	8	45	28	+17	37	
5	Steagul Roșu Plenița	30	15	2	13	49	46	+3	32	
6	FOB Balș	30	13	5	12	50	34	+16	31	
7	Știința Petroșani	30	15	1	14	50	40	+10	31	
8	Cimentul Târgu Jiu	30	10	9	11	30	27	+3	29	
9	Metalurgistul Sadu	30	12	5	13	34	32	+2	29	
10	CFR Craiova	30	11	7	12	37	42	−5	29	
11	Progresul Strehaia	30	11	6	13	42	54	−12	28	
12	Victoria Craiova	30	11	4	15	39	40	−1	26	
13	Meva Drobeta-Turnu Severin	30	10	6	14	30	44	−14	26	
14	CIL Drobeta-Turnu Severin	30	11	4	15	38	59	−21	26	
15	Metalul Topleț (R)	30	10	5	15	36	54	−18	25	Relegation to County Championship
16	Petrolul Țicleni (R)	30	3	6	21	22	72	−50	12	Relegation to County Championship

Source: romaniansoccer.ro
(C) Champions; (P) Promoted; (R) Relegated

=== Seria VIII ===
Pos	Team	Pld	W	D	L	GF	GA	GD	Pts	Promotion or relegation
1	Minerul Moldova Nouă (C, P)	30	17	4	9	56	29	+27	38	Promotion to Divizia B
2	Dacia Orăștie	30	16	4	10	42	29	+13	36	
3	Unirea Tomnatic	30	15	5	10	35	33	+2	35	
4	Metalul Oțelu Roșu	30	14	4	12	68	51	+17	32	
5	CFR Simeria	30	14	4	12	54	50	+4	32	
6	Unirea Sânnicolau Mare	30	14	3	13	46	41	+5	31	
7	Bocșa	30	12	7	11	35	39	−4	31	
8	Constructorul Arad	30	12	7	11	46	52	−6	31	
9	Minerul Teliuc	30	14	2	14	48	40	+8	30	
10	Electromotor Timișoara	30	12	6	12	43	35	+8	30	
11	Minerul Ghelar	30	12	5	13	44	42	+2	29	
12	Progresul Timișoara	30	12	5	13	48	48	0	29	
13	Strungul Arad	30	11	3	16	42	54	−12	25	
14	CFR Caransebeș	30	10	5	15	29	43	−14	25	
15	Furnirul Deta (R)	30	10	5	15	32	57	−25	25	Relegation to County Championship
16	Gloria Arad (R)	30	6	9	15	25	50	−25	21	Relegation to County Championship

Source: romaniansoccer.ro
(C) Champions; (P) Promoted; (R) Relegated

=== Seria IX ===
Pos	Team	Pld	W	D	L	GF	GA	GD	Pts	Promotion or relegation
1	Metalul Aiud	30	19	6	5	65	17	+48	44	Promotion to Divizia B
2	Unirea Dej	30	19	5	6	82	25	+57	43	
3	Aurul Brad	30	20	2	8	83	31	+52	42	
4	Cimentul Turda	30	14	5	11	44	36	+8	33	
5	CIL Gherla	30	15	3	12	56	51	+5	33	
6	Soda Ocna Mureș	30	12	8	10	46	47	−1	32	
7	Constructorul Alba Iulia	30	12	4	14	39	46	−7	28	
8	Unirea Alba Iulia	30	11	6	13	36	43	−7	28	
9	Minerul Bihor	30	11	6	13	32	44	−12	28	
10	Recolta Salonta	30	10	7	13	32	36	−4	27	
11	Crișana Sebiș	30	11	5	14	31	41	−10	27	
12	Minaur Zlatna	30	12	3	15	22	35	−13	27	
13	Arieșul Câmpia Turzii	30	11	5	14	25	46	−21	27	
14	Dermata Cluj-Napoca	30	10	6	14	25	34	−9	26	
15	Tehnofrig Cluj-Napoca	30	10	3	17	39	48	−9	23	Relegation to County Championship
16	Someșul Beclean	30	4	4	22	24	101	−77	12	Relegation to County Championship

Source: romaniansoccer.ro

=== Seria X ===
Pos	Team	Pld	W	D	L	GF	GA	GD	Pts	Promotion or relegation
1	Minerul Baia Sprie (C, P)	30	17	6	7	56	19	+37	40	Promotion to Divizia B
2	Unirea Zalău	30	16	7	7	45	21	+24	39	
3	Bihoreana Marghita	30	14	9	7	50	32	+18	37	
4	CIL Sighetu Marmației	30	16	4	10	51	33	+18	36	
5	Someșul Satu Mare	30	15	5	10	52	30	+22	35	
6	Minerul Borșa	30	14	4	12	52	39	+13	32	
7	Oașul Negrești	30	13	5	12	43	39	+4	31	
8	Bradul Vișeu de Sus	30	15	1	14	44	43	+1	31	
9	Voința Carei	30	11	7	12	50	53	−3	29	
10	Minerul Șuncuiuș	30	11	5	14	43	50	−7	27	
11	Topitorul Baia Mare	30	10	6	14	33	44	−11	26	
12	Minerul Băița	30	10	6	14	33	66	−33	26	
13	Victoria Zalău	30	10	5	15	37	54	−17	25	
14	Rapid Jibou	30	9	7	14	34	49	−15	25	
15	Gloria Baia Mare (R)	30	6	9	15	33	51	−18	21	Relegation to County Championship
16	Măgura Șimleu Silvaniei (R)	30	7	4	19	27	66	−39	18	Relegation to County Championship

Source: romaniansoccer.ro
(C) Champions; (P) Promoted; (R) Relegated

=== Seria XI ===
Pos	Team	Pld	W	D	L	GF	GA	GD	Pts	Promotion or relegation
1	Oltul Sfântu Gheorghe (C, P)	30	22	3	5	82	29	+53	47	Promotion to Divizia B
2	Chimica Târnăveni	30	17	7	6	63	32	+31	41	
3	Unirea Sfântu Gheorghe	30	15	4	11	60	34	+26	34	
4	Foresta Bistrița	30	14	6	10	45	37	+8	34	
5	Miercurea Ciuc	30	13	7	10	52	35	+17	33	
6	Viitorul Gheorgheni	30	13	7	10	58	49	+9	33	
7	Forestierul Târgu Secuiesc	30	12	5	13	58	40	+18	29	
8	Viitorul Târgu Mureș	30	11	7	12	47	53	−6	29	
9	Avântul Reghin	30	12	5	13	40	53	−13	29	
10	Minerul Rodna	30	13	1	16	54	65	−11	27	
11	Unirea Cristuru Secuiesc	30	11	4	15	35	55	−20	26	
12	Lacul Ursu Sovata	30	12	2	16	42	64	−22	26	
13	Minerul Bălan	30	10	5	15	38	40	−2	25	
14	Carpați Covasna	30	9	7	14	31	42	−11	25	
15	Mureșul Toplița (R)	30	8	8	14	38	58	−20	24	Relegation to County Championship
16	Hebe Sângeorz-Băi (R)	30	8	2	20	25	82	−57	18	Relegation to County Championship

Source: romaniansoccer.ro
(C) Champions; (P) Promoted; (R) Relegated

=== Seria XII ===
Pos	Team	Pld	W	D	L	GF	GA	GD	Pts	Promotion or relegation
1	CSU Brașov (C, P)	30	16	5	9	53	26	+27	37	Promotion to Divizia B
2	Textila Cisnădie	30	17	3	10	45	29	+16	37	
3	ICIM Brașov	30	15	6	9	42	25	+17	36	
4	CFR Sighișoara	30	15	4	11	49	31	+18	34	
5	Precizia Săcele	30	13	6	11	35	28	+7	32	
6	Chimia Orașul Victoria	30	13	6	11	32	32	0	32	
7	Vitrometan Mediaș	30	14	2	14	38	38	0	30	
8	Metalul Copșa Mică	30	11	7	12	33	32	+1	29	
9	Lotru Brezoi	30	14	1	15	40	45	−5	29	
10	Torpedo Zărnești	30	10	8	12	26	26	0	28	
11	UPA Sibiu	30	10	8	12	35	40	−5	28	
12	Textila Sebeș	30	12	4	14	33	47	−14	28	
13	CIL Blaj	30	12	3	15	41	49	−8	27	
14	Chimistul Râmnicu Vâlcea	30	10	7	13	31	41	−10	27	
15	Carpați Mârșa	30	10	4	16	35	63	−28	24	Relegation to County Championship
16	Oltul Râmnicu Vâlcea	30	8	6	16	32	48	−16	22	Relegation to County Championship

Source: romaniansoccer.ro
(C) Champions; (P) Promoted

== See also ==
- 1973–74 Divizia A
- 1973–74 Divizia B
- 1973–74 County Championship
- 1973–74 Cupa României
