= 1972–73 County Championship =

31st season of the Liga IV, the fourth tier of the Romanian football league

Liga IV
- Season: 1972–73

The 1972–73 County Championship was the 31st season of the Liga IV, the fourth tier of the Romanian football league system. The champions of each county association promoted to Divizia C without promotion play-off. The promotion play-off was not held this season, due to the expansion of Divizia C from next season, from twelve series with 14 teams to twelve series of 16 teams.

== County championships ==
- Alba (AB)
- Arad (AR)
- Argeș (AG)
- Bacău (BC)
- Bihor (BH)
- Bistrița-Năsăud (BN)
- Botoșani (BT)
- Brașov (BV)
- Brăila (BR)
- Bucharest (B)
- Buzău (BZ)
- Caraș-Severin (CS)
- Cluj (CJ)
- Constanța (CT)
- Covasna (CV)
- Dâmbovița (DB)
- Dolj (DJ)
- Galați (GL)
- Gorj (GJ)
- Harghita (HR)
- Hunedoara (HD)
- Ialomița (IL)
- Iași (IS)
- Ilfov (IF)
- Maramureș (MM)
- Mehedinți (MH)
- Mureș (MS)
- Neamț (NT)
- Olt (OT)
- Prahova (PH)
- Satu Mare (SM)
- Sălaj (SJ)
- Sibiu (SB)
- Suceava (SV)
- Teleorman (TR)
- Timiș (TM)
- Tulcea (TL)
- Vaslui (VS)
- Vâlcea (VL)
- Vrancea (VN)

== Championships standings ==
=== Alba County ===
Pos	Team	Pld	W	D	L	GF	GA	GD	Pts	Promotion or relegation
1	Constructorul Alba Iulia (C, P)	22	14	4	4	57	25	+32	32	Promotion to Divizia C
2	CFR Teiuș	22	14	0	8	41	30	+11	28	
3	Recolta Vinerea	22	13	1	8	70	36	+34	27	
4	Minerul Baia de Arieș	22	12	1	9	39	30	+9	25	
5	Minerul Roșia Montană	22	11	2	9	37	35	+2	24	
6	Olimpia Aiud	22	10	3	9	40	32	+8	23	
7	Moții Abrud	22	11	1	10	42	42	0	23	
8	Recolta Păgida	22	8	4	10	43	49	−6	20	
9	Voința Teiuș	22	8	3	11	42	50	−8	19	
10	Foresta Câmpeni	22	8	3	11	24	48	−24	19	
11	Recolta Galda de Jos	22	8	1	13	46	43	+3	17	
12	Pănade (Note: Pănade was excluded from the championship after 18 rounds and lost all remaining matches with 0–3.)	22	3	1	18	10	71	−61	7	

Rules for classification: 1) Points; 2) Goal difference; 3) Number of goals scored.
(C) Champions; (P) Promoted

=== Arad County ===
Pos	Team	Pld	W	D	L	GF	GA	GD	Pts	Promotion or relegation
1	Crișana Sebiș (C, P)	29	20	5	4	60	22	+38	45	Promotion to Divizia C
2	Victoria Ineu	29	19	6	4	71	23	+48	44	
3	Victoria Ineu II	30	18	4	8	47	18	+29	40	
4	Șoimii Pâncota	30	16	5	9	67	39	+28	37	
5	Strungul Arad (Note: Strungul Arad took the place of Vagonul Arad in Divizia C due to the merge between CFR Arad and Vagonul Arad.) (P)	30	15	7	8	62	38	+24	37	Promotion to Divizia C
6	Stăruința Dorobanți	30	16	4	10	63	38	+25	36	
7	FZ Arad	30	14	5	11	53	44	+9	33	
8	Foresta Arad	30	12	5	13	39	51	−12	29	
9	Frontiera Curtici	30	11	6	13	59	59	0	28	
10	Libertatea Arad	30	13	1	16	52	64	−12	27	
11	Victoria Chișineu-Criș	29	11	4	14	47	57	−10	26	
12	Progresul Pecica	30	11	2	17	41	55	−14	24	
13	Mureșul Lipova	30	9	6	15	40	55	−15	24	
14	Șiriana Șiria	29	9	2	18	38	57	−19	20	
15	Foresta Beliu (R)	30	8	4	18	40	64	−24	20	Relegation to Arad County Championship II
16	Banatul Vinga (R)	30	2	2	26	12	107	−95	6	Relegation to Arad County Championship II

Rules for classification: 1) Points; 2) Goal difference; 3) Number of goals scored.
(C) Champions; (P) Promoted; (R) Relegated

=== Argeș County ===
Pos	Team	Pld	W	D	L	GF	GA	GD	Pts	Promotion or relegation
1	Vulturii Muscelului Câmpulung (C, P)	30	23	6	1	90	22	+68	52	Promotion to Divizia C
2	ARO Câmpulung	30	22	4	4	76	26	+50	48	
3	Avântul Rucăr	30	16	2	12	72	49	+23	34	
4	Minerul Câmpulung	30	12	8	10	50	41	+9	32	
5	Forestierul Stâlpeni	30	14	3	13	63	53	+10	31	
6	Constructorul Pitești	30	12	7	11	38	33	+5	31	
7	Argeșeana Pitești	30	13	4	13	43	37	+6	30	
8	Topoloveni	30	10	10	10	51	50	+1	30	
9	Viitorul Câmpulung	30	10	9	11	33	36	−3	29	
10	ASA Pitești	30	13	2	15	56	53	+3	28	
11	Progresul Pitești	30	10	7	13	33	47	−14	27	
12	Ascensorul Pitești	30	10	4	16	35	55	−20	24	
13	Petrolul Pitești	30	9	6	15	35	62	−27	24	
14	Rapid Pitești	30	7	9	14	44	69	−25	23	
15	Curtea de Argeș	30	7	8	15	47	83	−36	22	
16	Recolta IAS Costești	30	5	5	20	34	83	−49	15	

Rules for classification: 1) Points; 2) Goal difference; 3) Number of goals scored.
(C) Champions; (P) Promoted

=== Bihor County ===
Pos	Team	Pld	W	D	L	GF	GA	GD	Pts	Promotion or relegation
1	Minerul Șuncuiuș (C, P)	32	24	6	2	86	23	+63	54	Promotion to Divizia C
2	Voința Oradea	32	23	5	4	106	29	+77	51	
3	Oțelul Petru Groza	32	19	4	9	69	34	+35	42	
4	Stăruința Săcueni	32	15	11	6	44	30	+14	41	
5	Stăruința Aleșd	32	15	9	8	53	35	+18	39	
6	Minerul Voivozi	32	17	3	12	81	50	+31	37	
7	Înfrățirea Oradea	32	15	4	13	54	48	+6	34	
8	Flamura Pădurea Neagră	32	12	6	14	44	39	+5	30	
9	Unirea Valea lui Mihai	32	13	3	16	53	48	+5	29	
10	Biharea Vașcău	32	13	2	17	49	63	−14	28	
11	Crișana Tinca	32	10	7	15	40	53	−13	27	
12	Crișul Girișu de Criș	32	11	4	17	50	78	−28	26	
13	Bihorul Beiuș	32	8	8	16	39	59	−20	24	
14	Voința Marghita	32	9	6	17	41	82	−41	24	
15	Rapid Oradea	32	6	8	18	47	88	−41	20	
16	Victoria Galoșpetru (R)	32	8	4	20	36	106	−70	20	Relegation to Bihor Championship II
17	Forestierul Tileagd (R)	32	7	4	21	35	62	−27	18	Relegation to Bihor Championship II

Source: adt.arcanum.com
Rules for classification: 1) Points; 2) Goal difference; 3) Number of goals scored.
(C) Champions; (P) Promoted; (R) Relegated

=== Botoșani County ===
Pos	Team	Pld	W	D	L	GF	GA	GD	Pts	Promotion or relegation
1	Constructorul Botoșani (C, P)	26	24	1	1	97	23	+74	49	Promotion to Divizia C
2	Victoria PTTR Botoșani (P)	26	19	2	5	82	31	+51	40	Promotion to Divizia C
3	Unirea Săveni	26	19	2	5	82	44	+38	40	
4	Siretul Bucecea	26	16	2	8	80	46	+34	34	
5	UJCC Botoșani	26	14	1	11	64	66	−2	29	
6	Energia Botoșani	25	11	5	9	47	55	−8	27	
7	Gloria Frumușica	26	11	3	12	42	49	−7	25	
8	Sănătatea Darabani	26	11	2	13	59	76	−17	24	
9	Sportivul Trușești	26	10	2	14	40	68	−28	22	
10	Sănătatea Botoșani	26	8	5	13	37	40	−3	21	
11	Viitorul Săveni	26	9	1	16	53	67	−14	19	
12	Rapid Ungureni	25	6	4	15	36	56	−20	16	
13	Flamura Roșie Botoșani	26	4	3	19	31	84	−53	11	
14	Progresul Ștefănești	26	2	3	21	19	74	−55	7	

Rules for classification: 1) Points; 2) Goal difference; 3) Number of goals scored.
(C) Champions; (P) Promoted

=== Bucharest ===
Pos	Team	Pld	W	D	L	GF	GA	GD	Pts	Qualification or relegation
1	IOR București (C, P)	30	15	10	5	44	24	+20	40	Promotion to Divizia C
2	Abatorul București	30	15	9	6	37	26	+11	39	
3	ICSIM București	30	14	9	7	40	24	+16	37	
4	Automatica București	30	11	11	8	33	20	+13	33	
5	Prefabricate București	30	9	14	7	27	20	+7	32	
6	UREMOAS București	30	12	8	10	36	36	0	32	
7	Mașini Unelte București	30	8	15	7	29	29	0	31	
8	Vulcan București	30	12	6	12	53	51	+2	30	
9	Agronomia București	30	10	10	10	28	28	0	30	
10	Vâscoza București	30	12	5	13	46	39	+7	29	
11	Granitul București	30	10	8	12	31	33	−2	28	
12	CPB București	30	9	10	11	32	34	−2	28	
13	Electra București	30	11	5	14	41	46	−5	27	
14	Chimistul București	30	9	8	13	34	43	−9	26	
15	Bere Rahova (R)	30	6	11	13	36	49	−13	23	Relegation to Bucharest Championship II
16	Acumulatorul București (R)	30	3	9	18	17	60	−43	15	Relegation to Bucharest Championship II

Rules for classification: 1) Points; 2) Goal difference; 3) Number of goals scored.
(C) Champions; (P) Promoted; (R) Relegated

=== Caraș-Severin County ===
Series I

Pos	Team	Pld	W	D	L	GF	GA	GD	Pts	Qualification or relegation
1	Victoria Caransebeș (Q)	22	17	3	2	67	12	+55	37	Qualification to championship final
2	Siderurgistul Reșița	22	14	4	4	40	21	+19	32	
3	Minerul Oravița	22	13	4	5	51	17	+34	30	
4	Electrica Reșița	22	14	1	7	39	28	+11	29	
5	CFR Oravița	22	11	2	9	51	26	+25	24	
6	Minerul Ocna de Fier	22	9	4	9	33	39	−6	22	
7	Metalul Anina	22	10	1	11	38	37	+1	21	
8	Minerul Dognecea	22	8	5	9	31	37	−6	21	
9	Muncitorul Reșița	22	8	3	11	25	38	−13	19	
10	Energia Reșița	22	6	5	11	33	31	+2	17	
11	Unirea Grădinari	22	5	2	15	19	58	−39	12	
12	Voința Șoșdea (Note: Voința Șoșdea was excluded from the championship after 14 rounds and lost all remaining matches with 0–3.) (D)	22	0	0	22	3	86	−83	0	Excluded

Rules for classification: 1) Points; 2) Goal difference; 3) Number of goals scored.
(D) Disqualified; (Q) Qualified for the phase indicated
Notes:

Series II

Pos	Team	Pld	W	D	L	GF	GA	GD	Pts	Qualification or relegation
1	CFR Caransebeș (Q)	22	17	3	2	101	21	+80	37	Qualification to championship final
2	ITA Reșița	22	14	3	5	59	32	+27	31	
3	Gloria Reșița	22	11	4	7	42	28	+14	26	
4	Recolta Berzovia	22	12	0	10	47	32	+15	24	
5	Bistra Glimboca	22	10	3	9	39	38	+1	23	
6	Nera Bozovici	22	9	5	8	32	43	−11	23	
7	Metalul Oțelu Roșu II	22	8	5	9	30	31	−1	21	
8	Progresul Băile Herculane	22	8	4	10	36	46	−10	20	
9	Foresta Zăvoi	22	8	3	11	31	55	−24	19	
10	Bocșa II	22	7	3	12	32	52	−20	17	
11	ICM Caransebeș	22	6	2	14	27	55	−28	14	
12	Dunărea Moldova Veche	22	2	5	15	27	70	−43	9	

Rules for classification: 1) Points; 2) Goal difference; 3) Number of goals scored.
(Q) Qualified for the phase indicated

Championship final

The matches was played on 9 and 16 June 1973.

Team 1	Agg.	Team 2	1st leg	2nd leg
CFR Caransebeș	2–1	Victoria Caransebeș	0–0	2–1

CFR Caransebeș won the Caraș-Severin County Championship and promoted to Divizia C.

=== Cluj County ===
Pos	Team	Pld	W	D	L	GF	GA	GD	Pts	Qualification or relegation
1	Cimentul Turda (C, P)	26	19	3	4	59	23	+36	41	Promotion to Divizia C
2	Motorul URA Cluj-Napoca	26	15	6	5	60	29	+31	36	
3	Libertatea Cluj-Napoca	26	13	5	8	42	27	+15	31	
4	Flacăra Cluj-Napoca	26	11	9	6	52	37	+15	31	
5	Izolatorul Turda	26	11	5	10	44	47	−3	27	
6	Vulturii Mintiu Gherlii	26	10	7	9	35	38	−3	27	
7	CFR Dej	26	9	8	9	39	34	+5	26	
8	CM Cluj-Napoca	26	8	9	9	47	46	+1	25	
9	Minerul Aghireș	26	9	6	11	42	36	+6	24	
10	Electrometal Cluj-Napoca	26	10	2	14	45	54	−9	22	
11	Spicul Luna	26	8	6	12	35	58	−23	22	
12	Vlădeasa Huedin	26	8	4	14	49	62	−13	20	
13	Înfrățirea Livada	26	7	6	13	43	67	−24	20	
14	Unirea Florești	26	3	6	17	18	52	−34	12	

Rules for classification: 1) Points; 2) Goal difference; 3) Number of goals scored.
(C) Champions; (P) Promoted

=== Dolj County ===
Series I

Pos	Team	Pld	W	D	L	GF	GA	GD	Pts	Qualification or relegation
1	CFR Craiova (Q)	30	25	2	3	111	18	+93	52	Qualification to championship final
2	Constructorul Craiova	30	24	2	4	91	27	+64	50	
3	Avântul Bârca	30	20	4	6	77	32	+45	44	
4	Automobilul URA Craiova	30	18	5	7	67	40	+27	41	
5	Unirea Tricolor Dăbuleni	30	18	0	12	74	52	+22	36	
6	Avântul Filiași	30	14	6	10	50	48	+2	34	
7	Progresul Goicea Mică	30	14	1	15	47	43	+4	29	
8	Dunărea Bistreț	30	14	1	15	52	52	0	29	
9	Progresul Segarcea	30	13	3	14	51	61	−10	29	
10	Recolta Dunăreni	30	12	3	15	63	61	+2	27	
11	Unirea Dioști	30	11	2	17	47	83	−36	24	
12	Fulgerul Mârșani	30	10	3	17	41	62	−21	23	
13	Torentul Secu	30	11	1	18	48	82	−34	23	
14	Electroputere Craiova II	30	7	1	22	31	79	−48	15	
15	Autometal Craiova	30	6	2	22	26	72	−46	14	
16	Unirea Cârcea	30	4	2	24	22	86	−64	10	

Rules for classification: 1) Points; 2) Goal difference; 3) Number of goals scored.
(Q) Qualified for the phase indicated

Series II

Pos	Team	Pld	W	D	L	GF	GA	GD	Pts	Qualification or relegation
1	Progresul Băilești (Q)	30	27	2	1	116	10	+106	56	Qualification to championship final
2	Unirea Goicea Mare	30	20	3	7	97	29	+68	43	
3	Recolta Urzicuța	30	15	6	9	59	39	+20	36	
4	Electrocentrala Craiova	30	14	6	10	62	56	+6	34	
5	Tractorul Cetate	30	15	3	12	67	61	+6	33	
6	Eruga Siliștea Crucii	30	14	3	13	51	70	−19	31	
7	Chimia Craiova	30	12	5	13	67	61	+6	29	
8	Recolta Afumați	30	13	3	14	61	59	+2	29	
9	Utilajul Craiova	30	11	7	12	54	55	−1	29	
10	Recolta Seaca de Câmp	30	11	6	13	68	69	−1	28	
11	Recolta Covei	30	11	4	15	39	75	−36	26	
12	Progresul Radovan	30	11	3	16	49	73	−24	25	
13	Confecția Craiova	30	9	5	16	45	62	−17	23	
14	Avântul Rast	30	8	6	16	44	97	−53	22	
15	Voința Craiova	30	9	0	21	43	59	−16	18	
16	Avântul Pielești	30	5	4	21	38	91	−53	14	

Rules for classification: 1) Points; 2) Goal difference; 3) Number of goals scored.
(Q) Qualified for the phase indicated

Championship final

The matches was played on 3 and 10 June 1973.

Team 1	Agg.	Team 2	1st leg	2nd leg
CFR Craiova	3–2	Progresul Băilești	3–1	0–1

CFR Craiova won the Dolj County Championship and promoted to Divizia C.

=== Galați County ===
Pos	Team	Pld	W	D	L	GF	GA	GD	Pts	Promotion or relegation
1	Tehnometal Galați (C, P)	30	24	1	5	79	37	+42	49	Promotion to Divizia C
2	Mecanizatorul Târgu Bujor	30	21	6	3	103	28	+75	48	
3	Victoria TC Galați	30	20	6	4	85	28	+57	46	
4	Viitorul UMAIA Galați	30	21	3	6	85	34	+51	45	
5	Flamura Roșie Tecuci	30	16	6	8	74	44	+30	38	
6	Avântul Liești	30	11	10	9	44	49	−5	32	
7	Unirea Tulucești	30	13	4	13	48	56	−8	30	
8	Muncitorul Ghidigeni	30	12	3	15	49	72	−23	27	
9	Metalosport Galați	30	8	10	12	52	49	+3	26	
10	Recolta Tudor Vladimirescu	30	11	3	16	42	55	−13	25	
11	Șoimii Foltești	30	11	3	16	39	64	−25	25	
12	Victoria IGL Galați	30	10	4	16	35	61	−26	24	
13	Victoria Independența	30	9	5	16	40	65	−25	23	
14	Foresta Șendreni	30	8	5	17	51	77	−26	21	
15	Trefilorul Galați	30	7	2	21	44	76	−32	16	
16	Recolta Cuca	30	2	3	25	21	96	−75	7	

Rules for classification: 1) Points; 2) Goal difference; 3) Number of goals scored.
(C) Champions; (P) Promoted

=== Harghita County ===
Pos	Team	Pld	W	D	L	GF	GA	GD	Pts	Promotion or relegation
1	Miercurea Ciuc (C, P)	26	24	2	0	108	3	+105	50	Promotion to Divizia C
2	Harghita Odorheiu Secuiesc	26	19	3	4	89	16	+73	41	
3	Bastionul Lăzarea	26	16	3	7	67	44	+23	35	
4	Apemin Borsec	26	15	2	9	88	41	+47	32	
5	Sănătatea Tulgheș	26	14	3	9	59	49	+10	31	
6	Minerul Lueta	26	11	4	11	44	45	−1	26	
7	Complexul Gălăuțaș	26	11	4	11	49	58	−9	26	
8	Constructorul Miercurea Ciuc	26	11	1	14	55	60	−5	23	
9	Tricotajul Miercurea Ciuc	26	10	3	13	36	48	−12	23	
10	Bradul Hodoșa	26	9	5	12	43	60	−17	23	
11	Flamura Roșie Sânsimion	26	9	4	13	44	60	−16	22	
12	IPEG Bălan	26	8	1	17	34	80	−46	17	
13	Recolta Ditrău	26	5	3	18	36	64	−28	13	
14	IPEG Sărmaș	26	0	2	24	14	138	−124	2	

Rules for classification: 1) Points; 2) Goal difference; 3) Number of goals scored.
(C) Champions; (P) Promoted

=== Hunedoara County ===
Valea Jiului Series

Pos	Team	Pld	W	D	L	GF	GA	GD	Pts	Qualification or relegation
1	Minerul Vulcan (Q)	18	13	2	3	55	15	+40	28	Qualification to championship final
2	Parângul Lonea	18	13	1	4	57	19	+38	27	
3	Minerul Aninoasa	18	11	2	5	47	22	+25	24	
4	Energia Paroșeni	18	9	1	8	46	34	+12	19	
5	Preparatorul Lupeni	18	8	1	9	41	37	+4	17	
6	Minerul Uricani	18	8	1	9	23	31	−8	17	
7	Preparatorul Petrila	18	6	3	9	30	36	−6	15	
8	Utilajul Petroșani	18	6	1	11	23	60	−37	13	
9	Preparatorul Coroiești (R)	18	5	1	12	26	59	−33	11	Relegation to Hunedoara County Championship II
10	Streiul Baru (R)	18	4	1	13	19	50	−31	9	Relegation to Hunedoara County Championship II

Rules for classification: 1) Points; 2) Goal difference; 3) Number of goals scored.
(Q) Qualified for the phase indicated; (R) Relegated

Valea Mureșului Series

Pos	Team	Pld	W	D	L	GF	GA	GD	Pts	Qualification or relegation
1	Dacia Orăștie (Q)	30	24	4	2	97	18	+79	52	Qualification to championship final
2	Constructorul Hunedoara	30	24	3	3	121	14	+107	51	
3	Sportul Studențesc Hunedoara	30	19	6	5	74	28	+46	44	
4	IGCL Hunedoara	30	19	4	7	88	36	+52	42	
5	Dacia Deva	30	19	3	8	75	38	+37	41	
6	Prefabricate Cristur	29	18	4	7	68	35	+33	40	
7	Aurul Certej	30	17	3	10	67	46	+21	37	
8	Gloria Hațeg	30	16	2	12	71	52	+19	34	
9	Viitorul Valea Brad	30	12	5	13	61	83	−22	29	
10	CFR Simeria II (R)	30	11	3	16	62	75	−13	25	Relegation to Hunedoara County Championship II
11	Aurul Brad II (R)	29	7	3	19	49	72	−23	17	Relegation to Hunedoara County Championship II
12	Victoria Dobra (R)	30	6	4	20	27	89	−62	16	Relegation to Hunedoara County Championship II
13	Minerul Teliuc II (R)	30	5	5	20	32	94	−62	15	Relegation to Hunedoara County Championship II
14	Victoria Călan II	30	6	2	22	35	84	−49	14	Relegation to Hunedoara County Championship II
15	Voința Ilia (R)	30	5	3	22	38	101	−63	13	Relegation to Hunedoara County Championship II
16	Minerul Ghelar II (R)	30	5	3	22	22	122	−100	13	Relegation to Hunedoara County Championship II

Rules for classification: 1) Points; 2) Goal difference; 3) Number of goals scored.
(Q) Qualified for the phase indicated; (R) Relegated

Championship final

Team 1	Agg.	Team 2	1st leg	2nd leg
Minerul Vulcan	0–5	Dacia Orăștie	0–0	0–5

Dacia Orăștie won the Hunedoara County Championship and promoted to Divizia C.

=== Maramureș County ===
Pos	Team	Pld	W	D	L	GF	GA	GD	Pts	Promotion or relegation
1	Gloria Baia Mare (C, P)	20	17	2	1	57	7	+50	36	Promotion to Divizia C
2	Minerul Băița (Note: Minerul Băița took the place of Constructorul Baia Mare in Divizia C.) (P)	20	16	2	2	70	13	+57	34	Promotion to Divizia C
3	Minerul Băiuț	20	10	4	6	44	22	+22	24	
4	Voința Sighetu Marmației	20	10	2	8	32	34	−2	22	
5	Maramureșana Sighetu Marmației	20	7	4	9	24	35	−11	18	
6	Lăpușul Târgu Lăpuș	20	7	3	10	24	29	−5	17	
7	Unirea Seini	20	7	2	11	23	31	−8	16	
8	Electrica Baia Mare	20	7	1	12	28	41	−13	15	
9	Tisa Sarasău	20	5	4	11	33	68	−35	14	
10	Forestiera Câmpulung la Tisa	20	4	4	12	18	45	−27	12	
11	Olimpia Baia Mare	20	3	4	13	17	51	−34	10	

Rules for classification: 1) Points; 2) Goal difference; 3) Number of goals scored.
(C) Champions; (P) Promoted

=== Neamț County ===
Pos	Team	Pld	W	D	L	GF	GA	GD	Pts	Promotion or relegation
1	Bradul Roznov (C, P)	22	12	4	6	58	28	+30	28	Promotion to Divizia C
2	Laminorul Roman	22	15	2	5	66	18	+48	27 (Note: Laminorul Roman and Celuloza Piatra Neamț deducted 5 points.)	
3	Celuloza Piatra Neamț	22	14	4	4	43	22	+21	27	
4	Unirea Piatra Neamț	22	11	4	7	49	29	+20	26	
5	Cetatea Târgu Neamț	22	12	2	8	44	49	−5	26	
6	Volanul Bicaz	22	8	8	6	29	30	−1	24	
7	Metalul Piatra Neamț	22	7	6	9	26	46	−20	20	
8	Hârtia Piatra Neamț	22	7	4	11	38	49	−11	18	
9	Industria Locală Piatra Neamț	22	6	5	11	36	44	−8	17	
10	Azochim Săvinești	22	7	3	12	24	39	−15	17	
11	Biruința Negrești	22	5	5	12	24	48	−24	15	
12	Victoria Tarcău	22	3	3	16	22	57	−35	9	

Rules for classification: 1) Points; 2) Goal difference; 3) Number of goals scored.
(C) Champions; (P) Promoted

=== Prahova County ===
Pos	Team	Pld	W	D	L	GF	GA	GD	Pts	Promotion or relegation
1	Avântul Măneciu (C, P)	30	21	4	5	77	43	+34	46	Promotion to Divizia C
2	Vagonul Ploiești	30	19	5	6	64	19	+45	43	
3	Petrolul Băicoi	30	18	6	6	48	18	+30	42	
4	Petrolul Teleajen	30	14	7	9	43	30	+13	35	
5	Tricolorul Breaza	30	15	4	11	42	38	+4	34	
6	Petrolul Urlați	30	14	4	12	36	41	−5	32	
7	Viitorul Slănic	30	14	3	13	47	44	+3	31	
8	UZUC Ploiești	30	11	6	13	29	24	+5	28	
9	Rapid Mizil	30	11	5	14	49	46	+3	27	
10	Dacia Ploiești	30	10	7	13	43	45	−2	27	
11	Flacăra Câmpina	30	11	4	15	34	44	−10	26	
12	Energia Vălenii de Munte	30	9	8	13	38	62	−24	26	
13	Chimistul Valea Călugărească	30	10	5	15	38	47	−9	25	
14	Electrica Câmpina	30	10	5	15	39	53	−14	25	
15	Metalul Câmpina (Note: Metalul Câmpina was spared from relegation due to the promotion of Avântul Măneciu in Divizia C.)	30	5	7	18	27	67	−40	17	Spared from relegation
16	Feroemail Ploiești (R)	30	6	4	20	23	56	−33	16	Relegation to Prahova County Championship II

Rules for classification: 1) Points; 2) Goal difference; 3) Number of goals scored.
(C) Champions; (P) Promoted; (R) Relegated

=== Satu Mare County ===
Pos	Team	Pld	W	D	L	GF	GA	GD	Pts	Promotion or relegation
1	Oașul Negrești-Oaș (C, P)	26	22	4	0	68	15	+53	48	Promotion to Divizia C
2	Sticla Poiana Codrului	26	15	4	7	69	33	+36	34	
3	Forestiera Bixad	26	10	7	9	64	42	+22	27	
4	Spicul Ardud	26	12	3	11	42	40	+2	27	
5	Unirea Tășnad	26	11	3	12	39	35	+4	25	
6	Automobilul Satu Mare	26	10	5	11	43	50	−7	25	
7	Recolta Urziceni	26	11	2	13	42	44	−2	24	
8	Recolta Dorolț	26	9	6	11	34	52	−18	24	
9	Rapid Satu Mare	26	10	3	13	46	47	−1	23	
10	Spartac Satu Mare	26	8	7	11	40	52	−12	23	
11	Recolta Căpleni	26	10	3	13	38	54	−16	23	
12	Talna Orașu Nou	26	8	6	12	37	54	−17	22	
13	Comerțul Satu Mare	26	8	4	14	33	47	−14	20	
14	Gloria Moftinu Mare	26	7	5	14	30	60	−30	19	

Rules for classification: 1) Points; 2) Goal difference; 3) Number of goals scored.
(C) Champions; (P) Promoted

=== Sălaj County ===
Pos	Team	Pld	W	D	L	GF	GA	GD	Pts	Promotion or relegation
1	Victoria Zalău (C, P)	28	21	6	1	101	19	+82	48	Promotion to Divizia C
2	Măgura Șimleu Silvaniei (P)	28	22	2	4	108	25	+83	46	Promotion to Divizia C
3	Minerul Sărmășag	28	18	4	6	59	31	+28	40	
4	Panificația Jibou	28	16	3	9	58	44	+14	35	
5	Recolta Hida	28	15	4	9	73	48	+25	34	
6	Gloria Șimleu Silvaniei	28	15	3	10	80	52	+28	33	
7	Silvania Cehu Silvaniei	28	15	3	10	54	37	+17	33	
8	Energia Sânmihaiu Almașului	28	11	6	11	53	48	+5	28	
9	Dumbrava Gâlgău Almașului	28	11	5	12	55	57	−2	27	
10	Armătura Zalău	28	12	0	16	37	55	−18	24	
11	Unirea Tricolor Nadiș	28	9	3	16	48	82	−34	21	
12	Minerul Surduc	28	8	2	18	41	67	−26	18	
13	Minerul Ip	28	7	4	17	30	73	−43	18	
14	Filatura Zalău	28	4	4	20	29	93	−64	12	
15	Ogorul Românași	28	1	1	26	10	105	−95	3	

Rules for classification: 1) Points; 2) Goal difference; 3) Number of goals scored.
(C) Champions; (P) Promoted

=== Sibiu County ===
Pos	Team	Pld	W	D	L	GF	GA	GD	Pts	Promotion or relegation
1	Carpați Mârșa (C, P)	30	20	5	5	84	30	+54	45	Promotion to Divizia C
2	Metalul IO Sibiu	30	19	5	6	68	34	+34	43	
3	IMIX Agnita	29	19	4	6	70	33	+37	42	
4	Construcții Sibiu	30	15	6	9	54	31	+23	36	
5	Metalurgica Sibiu	30	15	4	11	59	44	+15	34	
6	Automecanica Mediaș	30	12	5	13	45	49	−4	29	
7	Unirea Tălmaciu	30	11	4	15	38	42	−4	26	
8	Sparta Mediaș	29	9	8	12	45	54	−9	26	
9	Stăruința Mediaș	30	9	8	13	31	40	−9	26	
10	Șantierul Sibiu	30	9	8	13	42	54	−12	26	
11	CFR Sibiu	30	11	4	15	45	59	−14	26	
12	Avântul Dârlos	30	11	4	15	34	71	−37	26	
13	Carbosin Copșa Mică	30	9	6	15	57	55	+2	24	
14	Textila Mediaș	30	8	8	14	36	47	−11	24	
15	Record Mediaș	30	10	4	16	42	63	−21	24	
16	Unirea Ocna Sibiului	30	8	3	19	34	84	−50	19	

Rules for classification: 1) Points; 2) Goal difference; 3) Number of goals scored.
(C) Champions; (P) Promoted

=== Timiș County ===
Pos	Team	Pld	W	D	L	GF	GA	GD	Pts	Promotion or relegation
1	Unirea Sânnicolau Mare	28	16	5	7	71	28	+43	37	Promotion to Divizia C
2	Laminorul Nădrag	28	15	7	6	60	25	+35	37	
3	Șoimii Timișoara	28	12	8	8	41	25	+16	32	
4	Recolta Nerău	28	11	9	8	47	38	+9	31	
5	Tehnolemn Timișoara	28	11	8	9	42	29	+13	30	
6	Constructorul Timișoara	28	11	8	9	33	37	−4	30	
7	Progresul Gătaia	28	10	8	10	46	38	+8	28	
8	Progresul Ciacova	28	13	2	13	55	67	−12	28	
9	Unirea Jimbolia	28	11	5	12	35	32	+3	27	
10	Auto Timișoara	28	11	5	12	42	60	−18	27	
11	Ceramica Jimbolia	28	10	6	12	47	44	+3	26	
12	FZ Banatul Timișoara	28	9	6	13	22	39	−17	24	
13	Textila Timișoara	28	9	6	13	28	49	−21	24	
14	Electrobanat Timișoara	28	8	4	16	37	55	−18	20	
15	Recaș (Note: Recaș was spared from relegation due to the promotion of Unirea Sânnicolau Mare in Divizia C.)	28	7	5	16	21	61	−40	19	Spared from relegation
16	Politehnica Timișoara II (Note: Politehnica Timișoara II was excluded from the championship after 16 rounds and all its results were canceled.) (R)	0	0	0	0	0	0	0	0	Expelled

Rules for classification: 1) Points; 2) Goal difference; 3) Number of goals scored.
(R) Relegated

=== Vaslui County ===
Pos	Team	Pld	W	D	L	GF	GA	GD	Pts	Promotion or relegation
1	Hușana Huși (C, P)	28	26	1	1	102	14	+88	53	Promotion to Divizia C
2	Recolta Văleni	28	21	2	5	85	37	+48	44	
3	Avântul Huși	28	11	6	11	50	53	−3	28	
4	Progresul Găgești	28	11	2	15	48	75	−27	24	
5	Victoria Muntenii de Jos	28	11	1	16	37	54	−17	23	
6	Autobuzul Bârlad	28	10	3	15	46	69	−23	23	
7	Constructorul Vaslui	28	10	2	16	58	67	−9	22	
8	Unirea Negrești	28	3	1	24	18	75	−57	7	

Rules for classification: 1) Points; 2) Goal difference; 3) Number of goals scored.
(C) Champions; (P) Promoted

== See also ==
- 1972–73 Divizia A
- 1972–73 Divizia B
- 1972–73 Divizia C
- 1972–73 Cupa României
