= 1973–74 County Championship =

32nd season of the Liga IV, the fourth tier of the Romanian football league

Liga IV
- Season: 1973–74

The 1973–74 County Championship was the 32nd season of the Liga IV, the fourth tier of the Romanian football league system. The champions of each county association play against one from a neighboring county in a play-off to gain promotion to Divizia C.

== County championships ==
- Alba (AB)
- Arad (AR)
- Argeș (AG)
- Bacău (BC)
- Bihor (BH)
- Bistrița-Năsăud (BN)
- Botoșani (BT)
- Brașov (BV)
- Brăila (BR)
- Bucharest (B)
- Buzău (BZ)
- Caraș-Severin (CS)
- Cluj (CJ)
- Constanța (CT)
- Covasna (CV)
- Dâmbovița (DB)
- Dolj (DJ)
- Galați (GL)
- Gorj (GJ)
- Harghita (HR)
- Hunedoara (HD)
- Ialomița (IL)
- Iași (IS)
- Ilfov (IF)
- Maramureș (MM)
- Mehedinți (MH)
- Mureș (MS)
- Neamț (NT)
- Olt (OT)
- Prahova (PH)
- Satu Mare (SM)
- Sălaj (SJ)
- Sibiu (SB)
- Suceava (SV)
- Teleorman (TR)
- Timiș (TM)
- Tulcea (TL)
- Vaslui (VS)
- Vâlcea (VL)
- Vrancea (VN)

== Promotion play-off ==
Teams promoted to Divizia C without a play-off matches as teams from less represented counties in the third division.

- (VS) Recolta Văleni
- (DB) Oțelul Târgoviște
- (VN) Dinamo Focșani
- (GL) Mecanizatorul Târgu Bujor
- (MH) Dinamo Orșova
- (IL) IPRECA Călărași
- (TL) Recolta Frecăței
- (SM) Unirea Tășnad

The matches was played on 30 June and 7 July 1974.

Team 1	Agg.	Team 2	1st leg	2nd leg
Laminorul Roman (NT)	3–2	(IS) Șoimii Iași	2–1	1–1
CFR Teiuș (AB)	1–4	(SB) Inter Sibiu	1–1	0–3
Gloria Ineu (AR)	1–4	(TM) Ceramica Jimbolia	1–1	0–3
Topoloveni (AG)	0–4	(BV) Măgura Codlea	0–1	0–3
Spartac Poșta Câlnău (BZ)	–	(BC) Partizanul Bacău	1–4	–
Voința Oradea (BH)	4–1	(SJ) Minerul Sărmășag	3–0	1–1
Minerul Băiuț (MM)	3–1	(BN) Progresul Năsăud	3–0 (w/o)	0–1
Unirea Săveni (BT)	2–3	(SV) Foresta Moldovița	2–1	0–2
Dunărea Cernavodă (CT)	2–1	(BR) Automobilul Brăila	2–0	0–1
Petrolul Teleajen Ploiești (PH)	4–2	(IF) Avântul ICFT Urziceni	2–1	2–1
Sportul Studențesc Hunedoara (HD)	1–0 (Note: Following an appeal, the FRF decides to promote Minerul Oravița in Divizia C.)	(CS) Minerul Oravița	1–0	0–0
CM Cluj-Napoca (CJ)	2–1	(MS) Mureșul Luduș	2–1	0–0
Minerul Baraolt (CV)	2–1	(HR) Harghita Odorheiu Secuiesc	2–1	0–0
Progresul Băilești (DJ)	–	(GJ) Minerul Leurda	2–0	–
Unirea Băbeni (VL)	2–7	(OT) Viitorul Scornicești	1–1	1–6
Automatica București (B)	5–1	(TR) Textila Roșiori	4–0	1–1

== Championships standings ==
=== Arad County ===
Pos	Team	Pld	W	D	L	GF	GA	GD	Pts	Qualification or relegation
1	Gloria Ineu (C, Q)	30	21	6	3	79	25	+54	48	Qualification to promotion play-off
2	Victoria Ineu	30	21	2	7	59	25	+34	42 (Note: Victoria Ineu, Foresta Arad and Mureșul Lipova were deducted 2 points.)	
3	Foresta Arad	30	15	3	12	43	41	+2	31	
4	Frontiera Curtici	30	12	7	11	43	49	−6	31	
5	Stăruința Dorobanți	30	13	4	13	59	43	+16	30	
6	Victoria Chișineu-Criș	30	13	4	13	57	53	+4	30	
7	Progresul Pecica	30	11	7	12	34	37	−3	29	
8	Libertatea Arad	30	13	3	14	61	74	−13	29	
9	Șiriana Șiria	30	8	12	10	39	37	+2	28	
10	Șoimii Pâncota	30	11	6	13	44	47	−3	28	
11	FZ Arad	30	13	2	15	34	49	−15	28	
12	Înfrățirea Iratoșu	30	10	7	13	33	41	−8	27	
13	Electrometal Lipova	30	11	5	14	43	53	−10	27	
14	Foresta Beliu	30	10	6	14	44	51	−7	26	
15	Mureșul Lipova	30	11	3	16	36	58	−22	23	
16	Mureșul Arad	30	7	3	20	28	53	−25	17	

Rules for classification: 1) Points; 2) Goal difference; 3) Number of goals scored.
(C) Champions; (Q) Qualified for the phase indicated

=== Bihor County ===
Pos	Team	Pld	W	D	L	GF	GA	GD	Pts	Promotion or relegation
1	Voința Oradea (C, Q)	34	27	2	5	116	33	+83	56	Qualification to promotion play-off
2	Stăruința Aleșd	34	23	6	5	76	33	+43	52	
3	Unirea Valea lui Mihai	34	20	5	9	71	38	+33	45	
4	Minerul Voivozi	34	19	5	10	68	42	+26	43	
5	Oțelul Bihor	34	15	9	10	91	53	+38	39	
6	Înfrățirea Oradea	34	15	9	10	59	46	+13	39	
7	Sticla Pădurea Neagră	34	15	6	13	70	45	+25	36	
8	Biharea Vașcău	34	13	6	15	49	68	−19	32	
9	Recolta Diosig	34	12	7	15	58	79	−21	31	
10	Stăruința Săcueni	34	12	6	16	44	58	−14	30	
11	Bihorul Beiuș	34	11	8	15	42	56	−14	30	
12	Voința Marghita	34	10	9	15	38	52	−14	29	
13	Metalul Oradea	34	11	5	18	48	61	−13	27	
14	Forestierul Tileagd	34	12	3	19	51	66	−15	27	
15	Petromin Suplac	34	11	5	18	56	95	−39	27	
16	Rapid Oradea	34	9	7	18	43	75	−32	25	
17	Crișul Girișu de Criș (R)	34	10	4	20	53	101	−48	24	Relegation to Bihor Championship II
18	Crișana Tinca (R)	34	8	5	21	54	87	−33	21	Relegation to Bihor Championship II

Rules for classification: 1) Points; 2) Goal difference; 3) Number of goals scored.
(C) Champions; (Q) Qualified for the phase indicated; (R) Relegated

=== Caraș-Severin County ===
Pos	Team	Pld	W	D	L	GF	GA	GD	Pts	Qualification or relegation
1	Minerul Oravița (C, Q)	34	28	4	2	116	20	+96	60	Qualification to promotion play-off
2	Gloria Reșița	34	25	3	6	120	32	+88	53	
3	CFR Oravița	34	20	6	8	84	32	+52	46	
4	Electrica Reșița	34	21	1	12	93	44	+49	43	
5	Siderurgistul Reșița	34	19	4	11	81	40	+41	42	
6	Nera Bozovici	34	15	5	14	43	53	−10	35	
7	Metalul Anina	33	16	2	15	77	63	+14	34	
8	Victoria Caransebeș	34	12	7	15	44	63	−19	31	
9	Foresta Zăvoi	34	11	8	15	55	82	−27	30	
10	Bistra Glimboca	34	13	4	17	37	79	−42	30	
11	Minerul Ocna de Fier	34	14	1	19	57	63	−6	29	
12	Energia Reșița	34	11	7	16	47	69	−22	29	
13	ICM Caransebeș	34	13	2	19	58	101	−43	28	
14	Muncitorul Reșița	34	12	3	19	54	64	−10	27	
15	Minerul Dognecea	34	13	1	20	49	81	−32	27	
16	Progresul Băile Herculane	34	11	5	18	47	81	−34	27	
17	Recolta Berzovia	33	11	3	19	46	79	−33	25	

Rules for classification: 1) Points; 2) Goal difference; 3) Number of goals scored.
(C) Champions; (Q) Qualified for the phase indicated

=== Harghita County ===
Pos	Team	Pld	W	D	L	GF	GA	GD	Pts	Qualification or relegation
1	Harghita Odorheiu Secuiesc (C, Q)	34	29	2	3	112	25	+87	58 (Note: Harghita Odorheiu Secuiesc, Apemin Borsec, Textila Miercurea Ciuc and Constructorul Miercurea Ciuc were deducted two points.)	Qualification to promotion play-off
2	Apemin Borsec	34	25	5	4	128	32	+96	53	
3	Flamura Roșie Sânsimion	34	25	3	6	117	30	+87	53	
4	Bastionul Lăzarea	34	23	6	5	86	40	+46	52	
5	Textila Miercurea Ciuc	34	19	7	8	66	39	+27	43	
6	Rapid Ciceu	34	16	4	14	56	46	+10	36	
7	Minerul Lueta	34	13	6	15	62	65	−3	32	
8	Explorarea Bălan	34	13	6	15	57	65	−8	32	
9	Sănătatea Tulgheș	34	13	6	15	54	69	−15	32	
10	Mureșul Suseni	34	12	5	17	53	98	−45	29	
11	Minerul Bălan II	34	12	4	18	50	52	−2	28	
12	Complexul Gălăuțaș	34	11	6	17	71	76	−5	28	
13	Viitorul Gheorgheni II	34	13	1	20	54	73	−19	27	
14	Bradul Hodoșa	34	8	9	17	47	88	−41	25	
15	Bucin Joseni	34	9	6	19	45	103	−58	24	
16	Constructorul Miercurea Ciuc	34	10	5	19	50	73	−23	23	
17	Recolta Ditrău	34	6	4	24	39	92	−53	16	
18	Unirea Cristuru Secuiesc II	34	1	5	28	23	118	−95	7	

Rules for classification: 1) Points; 2) Goal difference; 3) Number of goals scored.
(C) Champions; (Q) Qualified for the phase indicated

=== Hunedoara County ===
Pos	Team	Pld	W	D	L	GF	GA	GD	Pts	Qualification or relegation
1	Sportul Studențesc Hunedoara (C, Q)	30	20	4	6	76	23	+53	44	Qualification to promotion play-off
2	Gloria Hațeg	30	17	4	9	77	37	+40	38	
3	Constructorul Hunedoara	30	16	5	9	81	37	+44	37	
4	Parângul Lonea	30	15	4	11	62	44	+18	34	
5	EGCL Hunedoara	30	15	3	12	50	47	+3	33	
6	Dacia Deva	30	14	4	12	67	53	+14	32	
7	FILOR Orăștie	30	13	6	11	49	57	−8	32	
8	Prefabricate Cristur	30	14	1	15	56	56	0	29	
9	Minerul Vulcan	30	12	3	15	55	52	+3	27	
10	Preparatorul Petrila	30	13	1	16	40	59	−19	27	
11	Viitorul Valea Brad	30	12	3	15	52	73	−21	27	
12	Aurul Certej	30	11	4	15	54	81	−27	26	
13	Minerul Aninoasa	30	10	5	15	49	52	−3	25	
14	Minerul Uricani	30	11	3	16	46	62	−16	25	
15	EGCL Petrila	30	11	2	17	39	74	−35	24	
16	Energia Paroșeni	30	8	4	18	52	98	−46	20	

Rules for classification: 1) Points; 2) Goal difference; 3) Number of goals scored.
(C) Champions; (Q) Qualified for the phase indicated

=== Prahova County ===
Pos	Team	Pld	W	D	L	GF	GA	GD	Pts	Qualification or relegation
1	Petrolul Teleajen (C, Q)	29	20	6	3	62	21	+41	47 (Note: Petrolul Teleajen deducted 1 points.)	Qualification to promotion play-off
2	Tricolor Ploiești	29	18	5	6	57	17	+40	41	
3	Petrolul Băicoi	27	12	6	9	45	22	+23	30	
4	Viitorul Slănic	25	13	3	9	45	39	+6	29	
5	Petrolul Urlați	25	10	7	8	25	36	−11	27	
6	Flacăra Câmpina	26	9	8	9	24	23	+1	26	
7	Chimistul Valea Călugărească	27	7	10	10	24	26	−2	24	
8	Tricolorul Breaza	26	9	5	12	35	45	−10	23	
9	Metalul Câmpina	26	9	5	12	30	40	−10	23	
10	IUC Ploiești	26	7	9	10	23	28	−5	23	
11	Electrica Câmpina	25	7	9	9	20	28	−8	23	
12	PECO Ploiești	25	7	9	9	27	40	−13	23	
13	Dacia Ploiești	27	5	11	11	27	37	−10	21	
14	Rapid Mizil	26	7	7	12	31	44	−13	21	
15	Energia Vălenii de Munte	24	7	6	11	29	42	−13	20	
16	Geamuri Scăieni	25	7	4	14	20	40	−20	18	

Rules for classification: 1) Points; 2) Goal difference; 3) Number of goals scored.
(C) Champions; (Q) Qualified for the phase indicated

=== Sălaj County ===
Pos	Team	Pld	W	D	L	GF	GA	GD	Pts	Qualification or relegation
1	Minerul Sărmășag (C, Q)	28	23	2	3	92	17	+75	48	Qualification to promotion play-off
2	Silvania Cehu Silvaniei	28	20	3	5	93	23	+70	43	
3	Dumbrava Gâlgău Almașului	28	19	3	6	85	26	+59	41	
4	Armătura Zalău	28	16	5	7	69	34	+35	37	
5	Gloria Șimleu Silvaniei	28	16	4	8	73	38	+35	36	
6	Energia Sânmihaiu Almașului	28	14	7	7	57	30	+27	35	
7	Recolta Hida	28	14	4	10	61	45	+16	32	
8	Unirea Tricolor Nadiș	28	15	2	11	57	50	+7	32	
9	Someșul Ileanda	28	13	3	12	62	61	+1	29	
10	Tractorul Nușfalău	28	10	4	14	41	60	−19	24	
11	Drum Nou Dragu	28	7	4	17	36	84	−48	18	
12	Minerul Surduc	28	7	0	21	26	83	−57	14	
13	Recolta Sălățig	28	5	1	22	37	102	−65	11	
14	Unirea Gârbou	28	5	1	22	27	94	−67	11	
15	Flacăra Rona	28	4	1	23	17	86	−69	9	

Rules for classification: 1) Points; 2) Goal difference; 3) Number of goals scored.
(C) Champions; (Q) Qualified for the phase indicated

=== Timiș County ===
Pos	Team	Pld	W	D	L	GF	GA	GD	Pts	Qualification or relegation
1	Ceramica Jimbolia (C, P)	34	22	7	5	78	30	+48	51	Qualification to promotion play-off
2	Șoimii Timișoara	34	15	10	9	45	35	+10	40	
3	Mănușarul Timișoara	34	14	11	9	56	41	+15	39	
4	Laminorul Nădrag	34	16	5	13	58	49	+9	37	
5	FZ Banatul Timișoara	34	16	5	13	58	49	+9	37	
6	Checeana Checea	34	15	7	12	48	37	+11	37	
7	Recolta Nerău	33	14	8	11	57	49	+8	36	
8	Progresul Gătaia	34	16	4	14	44	41	+3	36	
9	Progresul Ciacova	34	14	8	12	67	68	−1	36	
10	Auto Timișoara	34	12	10	12	54	43	+11	34	
11	Constructorul Timișoara	34	13	8	13	48	39	+9	34	
12	Textila Timișoara	34	13	8	13	47	53	−6	34	
13	Șoimii Buziaș	34	14	6	14	58	65	−7	34	
14	Comerțul Lugoj	34	13	7	14	53	63	−10	33	
15	Tehnolemn Timișoara	34	12	8	14	50	51	−1	32	
16	Electrobanat Timișoara	33	7	15	11	50	49	+1	29	
17	Recaș (R)	34	8	3	23	28	77	−49	19	Relegation to Timiș Championship II
18	Unirea Jimbolia (R)	34	5	2	27	17	77	−60	12	Relegation to Timiș Championship II

Rules for classification: 1) Points; 2) Goal difference; 3) Number of goals scored.
(C) Champions; (P) Promoted; (R) Relegated

=== Vaslui County ===
Pos	Team	Pld	W	D	L	GF	GA	GD	Pts	Qualification or relegation
1	Recolta Văleni (C, Q)	30	24	3	3	103	37	+66	51	Qualification to promotion play-off
2	Autobuzul Bârlad	30	22	3	5	93	36	+57	47	
3	Unirea Negrești	30	19	5	6	89	26	+63	43	
4	Progresul Găgești	30	15	5	10	54	49	+5	35	
5	Victoria Muntenii de Jos	30	15	4	11	64	47	+17	34	
6	Voința Ștefan cel Mare	30	15	3	12	63	46	+17	33	
7	Viitorul Vulturești	30	14	3	13	67	74	−7	31	
8	Viitorul Vetrișoaia	30	12	7	11	46	66	−20	31	
9	Avântul Codăești	30	13	2	15	65	54	+11	28	
10	Recolta Laza	30	11	4	15	52	70	−18	26	
11	Flacăra Murgeni	30	11	3	16	70	73	−3	25	
12	Avântul Huși	30	9	4	17	48	66	−18	22	
13	Avântul Băcani	30	9	4	17	29	57	−28	22	
14	Recolta Tutova	30	8	1	21	35	83	−48	17	
15	Avântul Deleni	30	7	3	20	34	84	−50	17	
16	Viitorul Pungești	30	6	4	20	38	85	−47	16	

Rules for classification: 1) Points; 2) Goal difference; 3) Number of goals scored.
(C) Champions; (Q) Qualified for the phase indicated

== See also ==
- 1973–74 Divizia A
- 1973–74 Divizia B
- 1973–74 Divizia C
- 1973–74 Cupa României
