= 1992–93 Divizia D =

51st season of the Liga IV, the fourth tier of the Romanian football league

Liga IV
- Season: 1992–93

The 1992–93 Divizia D was the 51st season of the Liga IV, the fourth tier of the Romanian football league system. The champions of each county association play against one from a neighboring county in a promotion play-off played over two legs. A special table was made and teams with the best 16 aggregate results were promoted to the third league.

== County leagues ==
- Alba (AB)
- Arad (AR)
- Argeș (AG)
- Bacău (BC)
- Bihor (BH)
- Bistrița-Năsăud (BN)
- Botoșani (BT)
- Brașov (BV)
- Brăila (BR)
- Bucharest (B)
- Buzău (BZ)
- Caraș-Severin (CS)
- Călărași (CL)
- Cluj (CJ)
- Constanța (CT)
- Covasna (CV)
- Dâmbovița (DB)
- Dolj (DJ)
- Galați (GL)
- Giurgiu (GR)
- Gorj (GJ)
- Harghita (HR)
- Hunedoara (HD)
- Ialomița (IL)
- Iași (IS)
- Maramureș (MM)
- Mehedinți (MH)
- Mureș (MS)
- Neamț (NT)
- Olt (OT)
- Prahova (PH)
- Satu Mare (SM)
- Sălaj (SJ)
- Sibiu (SB)
- Suceava (SV)
- Teleorman (TR)
- Timiș (TM)
- Tulcea (TL)
- Vaslui (VS)
- Vâlcea (VL)
- Vrancea (VN)

== Promotion play-off ==
The matches were played on 6 and 13 June 1993.

Team 1	Agg.	Team 2	1st leg	2nd leg	
Viitorul Chirnogi (CL)	0–21	(CT) Conpref Constanța	0–10	0–11	0–4 Pts.
Petrolul Berca (BZ)	13–1	(VN) Energia Focșani	8–0	5–1	0–4 Pts.
Constructorul U Craiova (DJ)	11–0	(OT) Constructorul Slatina	8–0	3–0	4–0 Pts.
Tehnometal București (B)	2–7	(B) Viscofil București	0–1	2–6	0–4 Pts.
ASA Rapid Miercurea Ciuc (HR)	5–0	(NT) Laminorul Roman	4–0	1–0	4–0 Pts.
Rulmentul Bârlad (VS)	3–6	(BC) Petrolul Moinești	2–4	1–2	0–4 Pts.
Rapid Fetești (IL)	3–1	(BR) Șantierul Naval Brăila	2–1	1–0	4–0 Pts.
Severnav Drobeta-Turnu Severin (MH)	1–3	(GJ) Jiul Rovinari	0–1	1–2	0–4 Pts.
Cristalul Dorohoi (BT)	0–2	(IS) CFR Tepro Iași	0–1	0–1	0–4 Pts.
Electrica Timișoara (TM)	2–8	(AR) CPL Arad	1–1	1–7	1–3 Pts.
Metalul Filipeștii de Pădure (PH)	0–5	(DB) Chimia Găești	0–0	0–5	1–3 Pts.
Dacia 92 Grăniceri Satu Mare (SM)	2–6	(BH) Olimpia Salonta	2–2	0–4	1–3 Pts.
Dunărea Giurgiu (GR)	2–3	(TR) Petrolul Videle	2–2	0–1	1–3 Pts.
Minerul Moldova Nouă (CS)	2–3	(HD) Parângul Lonea	1–1	1–2	1–3 Pts.
Precizia Săcele (BV)	1–4	(CV) IMASA Sfântu Gheorghe	1–0	0–4	2–2 Pts.
Progresul Năsăud (BN)	2–5	(SV) Minerul Gura Humorului	1–0	1–5	2–2 Pts.
Minaur Zlatna (AB)	5–3	(SB) Textila Cisnădie	4–0	1–3	2–2 Pts.
Industria Sârmei Câmpia Turzii (CJ)	3–4	(MS) Avicola Unirea Ungheni	3–0	0–4	2–2 Pts.
Minerul Sărmășag (SJ)	4–4	(MM) Minerul Baia Sprie	2–0	2–4	2–2 Pts.
ARO Câmpulung (AG)	4–4	(VL) Minerul Berbești	3–1	1–3	2–2 Pts.
Șantierul Naval Tulcea (TL)	1–3	(GL) Dunărea Romport Galați	1–0	0–3	2–2 Pts.

== League standings ==
=== Bihor County ===
Pos	Team	Pld	W	D	L	GF	GA	GD	Pts	Qualification or relegation
1	Olimpia Salonta (C, Q)	30	25	2	3	91	15	+76	52	Qualification to promotion play-off
2	Minerul Ștei	30	23	3	4	90	15	+75	49	
3	Crișul Aleșd	30	18	7	5	75	24	+51	43	
4	Phoenix Oradea	30	12	8	10	53	30	+23	32	
5	Romtrans Oradea	30	12	7	11	46	33	+13	31	
6	Petrolul Borș	30	11	6	13	53	47	+6	28	
7	Petrolul Suplac	30	13	3	14	49	51	−2	29	
8	Arovit Valea lui Mihai	30	13	3	14	39	42	−3	29	
9	Bihorul Beiuș	30	11	5	14	39	48	−9	27	
10	Oțelul Ștei	30	11	4	15	51	46	+5	26	
11	Stăruința Săcueni	30	12	2	16	38	45	−7	26	
12	Victoria Avram Iancu	30	10	4	16	39	60	−21	24	
13	Metalica Oradea	30	9	4	17	35	60	−25	22	
14	Minerul Vadu Crișului	30	9	4	17	43	86	−43	22	
15	Minerul Șuncuiuș	30	8	3	19	29	90	−61	19	
16	Biharea Vașcău	30	9	1	20	26	110	−84	19	

Rules for classification: 1) Points; 2) Goal difference; 3) Number of goals scored.
(C) Champions; (Q) Qualified for the phase indicated

=== Caraș-Severin County ===
Pos	Team	Pld	W	D	L	GF	GA	GD	Pts	Qualification or relegation
1	Minerul Moldova Nouă (C, Q)	26	20	4	2	75	15	+60	44	Qualification to promotion play-off
2	Minerul Oravița	26	17	1	8	67	36	+31	35	
3	Metalul Oțelul Roșu	26	14	4	8	58	27	+31	32	
4	Minerul Nera Bozovici	26	13	5	8	51	32	+19	31	
5	Metalul Topleț	26	14	3	9	46	28	+18	31	
6	Muncitorul Reșița	26	14	2	10	57	43	+14	30	
7	Energia Poiana Mărului	26	12	3	11	54	39	+15	27	
8	CFR Caransebeș	26	13	1	12	48	52	−4	27	
9	Foresta Caransebeș	26	11	2	13	65	47	+18	24	
10	CSM Reșița II	26	9	3	14	42	65	−23	21	
11	Foresta Zăvoi	26	10	0	16	46	70	−24	20	
12	Hercules Băile Herculane	26	8	3	15	53	58	−5	19	
13	Comerțul Moldova Nouă	26	8	0	18	38	75	−37	16	
14	Mecanizatorul Ciclova	26	2	3	21	15	109	−94	7	

Rules for classification: 1) Points; 2) Goal difference; 3) Number of goals scored.
(C) Champions; (Q) Qualified for the phase indicated

=== Dolj County ===
Pos	Team	Pld	W	D	L	GF	GA	GD	Pts	Qualification or relegation
1	Constructorul U Craiova (C, Q)	28	22	4	2	92	14	+78	70	Qualification to promotion play-off
2	Armata Craiova	28	18	5	5	51	25	+26	59	
3	CFR Craiova	28	15	3	10	54	36	+18	48	
4	Dunărea Calafat	28	14	5	9	44	36	+8	47	
5	Autobuzul Craiova	28	13	6	9	48	31	+17	45	
6	Progresul Segarcea	28	13	4	11	53	38	+15	43	
7	Energo TMC Filiași	28	14	2	12	48	40	+8	44	
8	Avântul IMP Craiova	28	10	8	10	39	37	+2	38	
9	Unirea Tricolor Dăbuleni	28	10	6	12	48	61	−13	36	
10	Victoria IRA Plenița	28	10	5	13	50	45	+5	35	
11	Chimica Craiova	28	7	8	13	37	54	−17	29	
12	Chimia Craiova	28	8	5	15	35	57	−22	29	
13	Fulgerul Maglavit	28	9	2	17	36	74	−38	29	
14	Progresul Băilești	28	7	5	16	37	58	−21	26	
15	Tricolor Sadova	28	5	2	21	22	88	−66	17	
16	Unirea Amărăștii de Jos (Note: Unirea Amărăștii de Jos excluded in the first part of the season and all its results were canceled.) (D)	0	0	0	0	0	0	0	0	Withdrew

Rules for classification: 1) points; 2) goal difference; 3) number of goals scored.
(C) Champions; (D) Disqualified; (Q) Qualified for the phase indicated

=== Hunedoara County ===
Pos	Team	Pld	W	D	L	GF	GA	GD	Pts	Qualification or relegation
1	Parângul Lonea (C, Q)	30	23	3	4	93	28	+65	49	Qualification to promotion play-off
2	Minerul Știința Vulcan	30	22	4	4	81	33	+48	48	
3	Constructorul Hunedoara	30	17	4	9	80	53	+27	38	
4	Mureșul Deva	30	14	5	11	56	40	+16	33	
5	Minerul Aninoasa	30	16	0	14	69	51	+18	32	
6	Haber Hațeg	30	14	4	12	47	52	−5	32	
7	CFR Simeria	30	14	1	15	59	45	+14	29	
8	Victoria 90 Călan	30	13	3	14	58	46	+12	29	
9	Aurul Brad	30	12	5	13	57	47	+10	29	
10	Minerul Certej	30	10	6	14	65	59	+6	26	
11	Metalul Crișcior	30	12	2	16	53	65	−12	26	
12	Minerul Bărbăteni	30	12	2	16	47	76	−29	26	
13	Minerul Ghelari	30	9	6	15	50	63	−13	24	
14	Metaloplastica Orăștie	30	10	3	17	60	64	−4	23	
15	Minerul Teliuc	30	9	4	17	37	80	−43	22	
16	Favior Orăștie	30	6	2	22	29	122	−93	14	

Rules for classification: 1) points; 2) goal difference; 3) number of goals scored.
(C) Champions; (Q) Qualified for the phase indicated

=== Neamț County ===
Pos	Team	Pld	W	D	L	GF	GA	GD	Pts	Qualification or relegation
1	Laminorul Roman (C, Q)	26	22	2	2	100	16	+84	46	Qualification to promotion play-off
2	Bradul Roznov	26	15	4	7	70	36	+34	34	
3	Juventus Piatra Neamț	26	14	5	7	71	26	+45	33	
4	Cimentul Bicaz	26	13	3	10	68	40	+28	29	
5	Danubiana Roman	26	13	1	12	58	56	+2	27	
6	Rapid Piatra Neamț	26	12	3	11	42	46	−4	27	
7	IM Piatra Neamț	26	11	3	12	66	60	+6	25	
8	Viitorul Podoleni	26	12	1	13	60	56	+4	25	
9	Voința Borlești	26	11	3	12	40	52	−12	25	
10	Azochim Săvinești	26	10	5	11	45	43	+2	23 (Note: Azochim Săvinești and Spicul Tămășeni were deducted 2 points.)	
11	Energia Săbăoani	26	10	0	16	37	63	−26	20	
12	Spicul Tămășeni	26	10	1	15	36	82	−46	19	
13	Vulturul Zănești	28	6	5	17	38	89	−51	17	
14	Șoimii Piatra Șoimului	26	5	2	19	34	100	−66	12	

Rules for classification: 1) Points; 2) Goal difference; 3) Number of goals scored.
(C) Champions; (Q) Qualified for the phase indicated

=== Timiș County ===
Pos	Team	Pld	W	D	L	GF	GA	GD	Pts	Qualification or relegation
1	Electrica Timișoara (C, Q)	30	25	4	1	109	13	+96	79	Qualification to promotion play-off
2	Auto FZB Timișoara	30	22	5	3	80	19	+61	71	
3	Unirea Foradex Tomnatic	30	21	5	4	77	30	+47	68	
4	Laminorul Nădrag	30	17	4	9	53	42	+11	55	
5	Dacia Timișoara	30	16	4	10	77	44	+33	52	
6	Obilici Sânmartinu Sârbesc	30	16	2	12	63	38	+25	50	
7	Șoimii Textila Timișoara	30	14	2	14	36	38	−2	44	
8	Modern Timișoara	30	12	5	13	30	37	−7	41	
9	Furnirul Deta	30	11	5	14	62	65	−3	38	
10	Timpuri Noi Giarmata	30	11	5	14	51	58	−7	38	
11	Victoria Azur Timișoara	30	12	2	16	54	49	+5	38	
12	Tehnolemn Timișoara	30	10	5	15	38	56	−18	35	
13	Unirea Sânnicolau Mare	30	12	1	17	44	67	−23	37	
14	Partizan Diniaș (R)	30	10	4	16	55	75	−20	34	Relegation to Timiș County Championship
15	Avântul Periam (Note: Avântul Periam and Ceramica Jimbolia withdrew during the season and lost all remaining matches with 0–3.) (R)	30	2	2	26	24	110	−86	8	Relegation to Timiș County Championship
16	Ceramica Jimbolia (R)	30	1	1	28	14	107	−93	4	Relegation to Timiș County Championship

Rules for classification: 1) points; 2) goal difference; 3) number of goals scored.
(C) Champions; (Q) Qualified for the phase indicated; (R) Relegated

== See also ==
- 1992–93 Divizia A
- 1992–93 Divizia B
- 1992–93 Divizia C
- 1992–93 Cupa României
