= List of CS Universitatea Craiova seasons =

Club Sportiv Universitatea Craiova is a Romanian professional football club based in Craiova, Dolj County, competing in Liga I, the top tier of Romanian football. It plays its home matches at Ion Oblemenco Stadium, which has a capacity of 30,983.

Chronology of names
Name	Period
UNSR Craiova	1948–1950
CSU Craiova	1950–1953
Știința Craiova	1953–1962
CSO Craiova	1962–1963
Știința Craiova	1963–1966
Universitatea Craiova	1966–1991
Universitatea Craiova	2013–present

Founded in 1948 as the football section of the CSU Craiova sports organisation, it remained within the university sports structure until 1991, when its league place was taken over by FC U Craiova following privatisation.

After a period of organisational changes and the dissolution of FC U Craiova, the sports club reactivated its football section in 2013. The current entity claims the honours of the historical Universitatea Craiova side, a status recognised by several court rulings and the Liga Profesionistă de Fotbal, though disputed by a separately re-established FC U Craiova.

Universitatea Craiova won five national league titles and eight Cupa României trophies, and reached the semi-finals of the 1982–83 UEFA Cup and the quarter-finals of the 1981–82 European Cup, becoming the first Romanian club to reach a UEFA competition semi-final.

== Seasons ==
=== The beginning ===
The football section was initially formed under the name UNSR (Uniunea Națională a Studenților din România, lit. 'National Union of Students in Romania') Craiova and enrolled in the county championship. The first official match was played at Filiași, aganinst CFR Filiași on 5 September 1948, with the Students losing 3–6. The team, led by head coach Nicolae Polojinski, wore white-and-blue shirts and was composed of Dumitrescu – Rădulescu, Mihăilă I, Carli – Ozon, Mihăilă II – Sabin, Ilie, Bădescu, Tudor, and Serghi.

1950 season

The football section changed its name from UNSR Craiova to CSU Craiova, the same name as its parent club. The early squads coached by Nicolae Polojinski included, among others, Mihai Vulpe (goalkeeper), Ion Popescu, Mihai Zorilă, Constantin Stănculescu, Petre Brebenaru, Gheorghe Florigoanță, Gheorghe Șerbu, Zbîrcea I, Zbîrcea II (defenders), Aurică Bratu, Naum Cricitoiu, Ion Florigoanță, Rădulescu, Firu (midfielders), Gheorghe Florescu, Liviu Borosan, Emilian Dilă, and Aurel Cumpănașu (forwards).

1951 season

CSU Craiova recorded a 6–0 victory over Constructorul Craiova in what was also the club’s first official appearance in Cupa României. The goals were scored by Firu (3), Borosan, Emilian Dilă, and Dreșcă.

1953 season

The club was renamed Știința Craiova. The team reached the Round of 32 of Cupa României, where it was eliminated by Spartac București after a 2–2 draw after extra time (1–1 at full-time), with the away team advancing according to the competition rules. The squad featured Stoica, Dreșcă, Rizu, Pîrvuleț, Anuțescu, Dan Popescu, Dumitru Popescu, Firu, Babarada, Emilian Dilă, and Jean Pădureanu.

1954 season

Coached by Nicolae Oțeleanu, Știința once again reached the Round of 32 in Cupa României, before narrowly losing 0–1 to Locomotiva Timișoara on 11 August 1954. They also won the Craiova Regional Championship and qualified for the promotion tournament.

Competing in Series II, held in Arad between 31 October and 14 November 1954, Știința lost 1–2 to Metalul 108 Cugir, defeated Flamura Roșie Râmnicu Vâlcea 2–0, drew 0–0 with Flacăra București, and then beat Metalul 113 Plopeni 2–1 and Metalul Oțelul Roșu 2–0. Finishing first with a record of three wins, one draw, and one defeat (7–3 goal difference, 7 points), the Students secured promotion to Divizia B for the first time in the club's history.

1955 season

Știința competed in Series I of Divizia B, finishing 12th, with a record of 24 matches, 6 wins, 6 draws, and 12 losses (21–33, 18 points), resulting in relegation to the newly re-established Divizia C. The squad included Stoica, Urucu, Vulpe, Dreșcă, Rizu, Pîrvuleț, Razga, Dumitrescu, Ciulava, Anuțescu, Briac, N. Dan, Nicolae Lambru, Căpitanu, Buldur, Ioniță, D. Popescu, V. Popescu, Valeriu Lupu, Firu, Babarada, Jean Pădureanu, Pantelimon, Traian Iliescu, Coicea, and Matei.

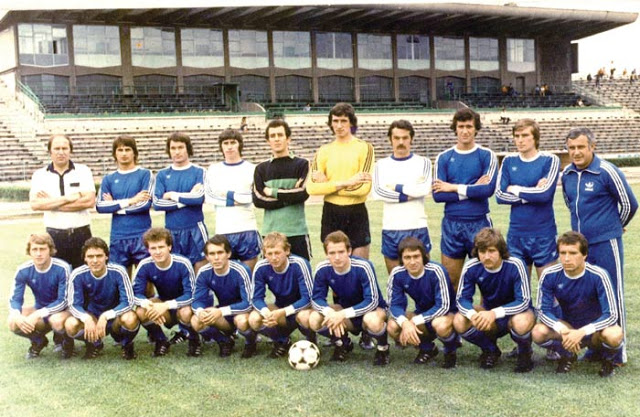
Universitatea Craiova (1980–81).

Season	League									Cupa României	Europe		Other competitions		Top goalscorers	
Season	Division	Pos.	Pl.	W	D	L	GF	GA	Pts	Cupa României	Europe		Other competitions		Name(s)	Goals
1956	Divizia C	3rd	22	11	5	6	26	14	27	p						
1957-58	Divizia C	**1st**	24	15	4	5	46	17	34	p						
1958-59	Divizia B	13th	26	7	6	13	30	51	20	p						
1959-60	Divizia B	10th	26	10	4	12	33	29	24	p						
1960-61	Divizia B	2nd	26	12	5	9	42	22	29	p						
1961-62	Divizia B	4th	26	11	7	8	40	26	29	p						
1962-63	Divizia B	5th	26	9	8	9	49	41	26	R16						
1963-64	Divizia B	**1st**	26	12	8	6	45	27	32	p						
1964–65	Divizia A	11th	26	9	4	13	31	40	22	R32					Sfârlogea	15
1965–66	Divizia A	8th	26	9	7	10	23	38	25	R32					Eftimie	4
1966–67	Divizia A	3rd	26	13	4	9	38	32	30	R16					**Oblemenco**	**17**
1967–68	Divizia A	11th	26	11	1	14	28	31	23	R16					Oblemenco	9
1968–69	Divizia A	7th	30	14	3	13	45	47	31	R32			Balkans Cup	GS	Oblemenco	19
1969–70	Divizia A	4th	30	13	7	10	40	37	33	R32			Balkans Cup	GS	**Oblemenco**	**19**
1970–71	Divizia A	6th	30	12	8	10	29	32	32	R32	Fairs Cup	R64			Oblemenco	12
1971–72	Divizia A	8th	30	13	5	12	42	35	31	R32					**Oblemenco**	**20**
1972–73	Divizia A	2nd	30	15	9	6	54	36	39	R32					**Oblemenco**	**21**
1973–74	Divizia A	**1st**	34	20	5	9	63	37	45	R32	UEFA Cup	R32			Bălan	19
1974–75	Divizia A	3rd	34	15	9	10	51	32	39	F	European Cup	R32			Oblemenco	17
1975–76	Divizia A	6th	34	13	10	11	41	32	36	SF	UEFA Cup	R64			Oblemenco	20
1976–77	Divizia A	3rd	34	16	9	9	54	36	41	**C**					Balaci	11
1977–78	Divizia A	6th	34	14	7	13	43	34	35	**C**	Cup Winners' Cup	R16			Balaci	12
1978–79	Divizia A	4th	34	15	18	11	40	25	38	QF	Cup Winners' Cup	R32			Cămătaru	13
1979–80	Divizia A	**1st**	34	17	10	7	66	31	44	SF	UEFA Cup	R16			Cămătaru	17
1980–81	Divizia A	**1st**	34	21	4	9	72	33	46	**C**	European Cup	R32			Cămătaru	23
1981–82	Divizia A	2nd	34	20	5	9	67	28	45	R16	European Cup	QF			Cârţu	19
1982–83	Divizia A	2nd	34	20	6	8	66	29	46	**C**	UEFA Cup	SF			Cârţu	19
1983–84	Divizia A	3rd	34	18	7	9	57	27	43	R16	UEFA Cup	R64			Cămătaru	17
1984–85	Divizia A	4th	34	17	5	12	61	46	39	F	UEFA Cup	R16			Cămătaru	18
1985–86	Divizia A	3rd	34	20	6	8	65	36	46	QF	Cup Winners' Cup	R16			Bâcu	25
1986–87	Divizia A	5th	34	11	13	10	40	34	35	QF	UEFA Cup	R32			Săndoi	5
1987–88	Divizia A	5th	34	16	4	14	61	51	36	QF	UEFA Cup	R64			Ciurea	15
1988–89	Divizia A	5th	34	15	6	13	52	52	36	R32			Balkans Cup	GS	Săndoi	6
1989–90	Divizia A	3rd	34	19	6	9	56	27	44	SF					Pavel Badea	8
1990–91	Divizia A	**1st**	34	22	6	6	74	26	50	**C**	UEFA Cup	R32			Săndoi, Ciurea	13
1991–92	Divizia A	4th	34	14	11	9	38	28	39	SF	European Cup	R32			Ciurea	9
1992–13 Not involved in any competitions
2013–14	Liga II	**1st**	32	20	7	5	48	23	67	R64					Curelea	9
2014–15	Liga I	5th	34	14	11	9	40	34	53	QF			League Cup	PO	Bawab	9
2015–16	Liga I	8th	40	15	9	16	45	44	54	R32			League Cup	PO	Nuno Rocha	8
2016–17	Liga I	5th	36	15	7	14	44	40	52	SF			League Cup	PO	Ivan	9
2017–18	Liga I	3rd	36	17	12	7	51	36	63	**C**	Europa League	QR3			Mitriță	12

Top scorers shown in italics with number of goals scored in bold are players who were also top scorers in Liga I that season.

=== Overall ===
- Seasons spent at Level 1 of the football league system: 31
- Seasons spent at Level 2 of the football league system: 8
- Seasons spent at Level 3 of the football league system: 2
- Seasons spent in regional leagues: 6

== Key ==
Key to league:

- Pos. = Final position
- Pl. = Played
- W = Games won
- D = Games drawn
- L = Games lost
- GF = Goals scored
- GA = Goals against
- Pts = Points

Key to rounds:

- C = Champion
- F = Final (Runner-up)
- SF = Semi-finals
- QF = Quarter-finals
- R16/R32 = Round of 16, round of 32, etc.
- 1R/2R = First round, second round, etc.
- 1Q/2Q = First qualifying round, second qualifying round, etc.
- QR = Qualifying rounds
- GS = Group stage
- PO = Play-off round

Champions	Runners-up
