= Dumbrava de Sus =

Dumbrava de Sus may refer to several villages in Romania:

- Dumbrava de Sus, a village in Ribița Commune, Hunedoara County
- Dumbrava de Sus, a village in Dumbrava Commune, Mehedinţi County
