= Marcel Pigulea =

Romanian footballer and manager

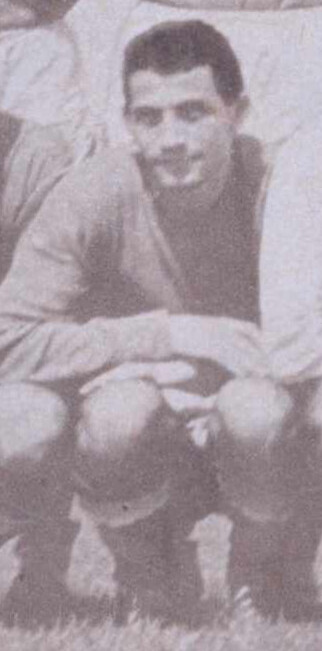

Personal information
- Date of birth: 24 May 1943 (age 83)
- Place of birth: Albulești, Romania
- Position: Right back

Youth career
- 1955–1959: Progresul Strehaia

Senior career*
Years	Team	Apps	(Gls)
1959–1961	Progresul Strehaia		
1961–1963	Dunărea Giurgiu		
1963–1964	Flacăra Roșie București		
1964–1965	Metalul București		
1965–1966	Dinamo București	0	(0)
1966–1968	Politehnica București (Note: The statistics for the 1966–67 Divizia B season are unavailable.)	14	(3)
1968–1974	Argeș Pitești	143	(2)
1974–1976	FCM Reșița	39	(0)
Total		196	(5)

International career
1970	Romania B	1	(0)

Managerial career
- 1976–1981: Chimia Râmnicu Vâlcea
- 1981–1982: Politehnica Timișoara
- 1982–1984: Romania U18
- 1984–1985: Dunărea Galați
- 1985–1986: Chimia Râmnicu Vâlcea
- 1986: Gloria Buzău
- 1986–1987: UTA Arad
- 1992–1995: Romania U18
- 1996–1997: Hassania Agadir
- 1998–1999: Algeria
- * Club domestic league appearances and goals

Marcel Pigulea (born 24 May 1943) is a Romanian former football player and manager.

== Club career ==
Pigulea was born on 24 May 1943 in Albulești, Romania and began playing junior-level football in 1955 at Progresul Strehaia, starting to play for the senior squad a few years later. In 1961 he went for two years at Dunărea Giurgiu, followed by one season at Flacăra Roșie București and another one at Metalul București, all of them being in the lower leagues of Romania. In 1965 he signed with Divizia A club, Dinamo București for which he did not play, one year later returning to Divizia B football at Politehnica București where he was teammates with Mircea Lucescu.

In 1968, Pigulea joined Argeș Pitești where on 8 September coach Ion Bălănescu gave him his Divizia A debut in a 2–1 away loss to Petrolul Ploiești. In the 1971–72 season he helped Argeș win the first title in its history, as coaches Titus Ozon and Florin Halagian gave him 27 appearances. Afterwards he played four games in the 1972–73 European Cup, eliminating Aris Bonnevoie in the first round, then in the following one they won a home game with 2–1 against Real Madrid but lost the second leg with 3–1. Years later in an interview for the Adevărul newspaper, Pigulea talked about the victory against the Spaniards:"It was an incredible victory for us and for Romanian football. Even now I still have the newspapers somewhere in the attic with the articles written in October 1972 about our victory against Real Madrid. We hoped, we believed, but we did not imagine that we would beat Real. The whole team played very well, and Dobrin was in top form." In his last season at Argeș, he played in both legs of the 6–2 loss on aggregate to Fenerbahçe in the first round of the 1973–74 UEFA Cup.

Pigulea ended his playing career after spending two seasons at Divizia A club FCM Reșița, totaling 182 matches with two goals in the competition.

== International career ==
On 22 April 1970, Pigulea played one match for Romania B, which ended in a 3–2 loss to Mexico.

== Managerial career ==
Pigulea started coaching in 1976 at Chimia Râmnicu Vâlcea which he helped gain promotion to the first league two years later. In 1981 he left Râmnicu Vâlcea to coach Politehnica Timișoara for one year. Afterwards he coached Romania's under-18 national team, helping it qualify to the 1983 European Under-18 Championship, forming players such as Gheorghe Hagi, Marius Lăcătuș, Gheorghe Mihali, Dumitru Stângaciu, Dorin Mateuț, Zsolt Muzsnay and Emil Săndoi. Since 1985, Pigulea coached several clubs, starting with Dunărea Galați, followed by a second spell at Chimia Râmnicu Vâlcea, subsequently working for Gloria Buzău and UTA Arad. In the early 1990s he started coaching Romania's under-18 side once again, this time promoting players such as Ionuț Luțu, Mugur Bolohan, Cristian Ciocoiu and Constantin Schumacher. In 1996 he started working abroad, first at Moroccan side Hassania Agadir, then from 1998 until 1999 at Algeria's national team. In 1999, Pigulea founded the private school "Clubul Pro Luceafărul" where players such as Răzvan Marin, Ianis Hagi and Nicolas Popescu took their first steps in football.

== Honours ==
=== Player ===
Argeș Pitești

- Divizia A: 1971–72

=== Manager ===
Chimia Râmnicu Vâlcea

- Divizia B: 1977–78
