= Dumbrava de Jos =

Dumbrava de Jos may refer to several villages in Romania:

- Dumbrava de Jos, a village in Ribița Commune, Hunedoara County
- Dumbrava de Jos, a village in Dumbrava Commune, Mehedinţi County
