= Stadionul Central =

Stadionul Central may refer to:

- Stadionul Central (Balotești)
- Stadionul Central (Mangalia)
- Stadionul Central (Recea)
- Stadionul Central (Vulcan)
