= Victor Stănculescu (football manager) =

Romanian football manager

Personal information
- Date of birth: 2 July 1934
- Place of birth: Frătești, Romania
- Date of death: 12 April 2024 (aged 89)
- Place of death: Chicago, United States

Managerial career
- Years: Team
- 1963: Rapid București
- 1970: Progresul București
- 1970–1974: Yanga
- 1975: Chimia Râmnicu Vâlcea
- 1984: Rapid București
- 1985: Bihor Oradea
- 1994–1995: Maldives
- 1995–1996: Bahrain
- 1997–1998: Tampines Rovers

Victor Stănculescu (2 July 1934 – 12 April 2024) was a Romanian professional football manager.

== Early life ==
Stănculescu was born on 2 July 1934 in Frătești, Romania. He had a sister.

== Career ==
He was assistant manager of Romanian side Rapid. He helped the club win the league. In 1970, he was appointed manager of Tanzanian side Yanga. In 1974, he was appointed manager of Romanian side Chimia Râmnicu Vâlcea. In 1993, he was appointed manager of the Maldives national football team. In 1995, he was appointed manager of the Bahrain national football team. In 1997, he was appointed manager of Singaporean side Tampines Rovers.

== Management style ==
He was described as "insisted on playing 3-5-2".

== Personal life ==
He has lived in Chicago, United States. He has worked as a sports psychologist.
