= Iulian Bălan =

Romanian footballer (1949–2005)

Personal information
- Date of birth: 15 July 1949
- Place of birth: Perișor, Romania
- Date of death: 24 January 2005 (aged 55)
- Position: Forward

Senior career*
Years	Team	Apps	(Gls)
1967	Metalul Craiova		
1968–1974	Universitatea Craiova	122	(36)
1975	Petrolul Ploiești	13	(2)
1975–1976	Jiul Petroșani	7	(0)
1976–1977	Electroputere Craiova	4	(0)
Total		146	(38)
- * Club domestic league appearances and goals

Iulian Bălan (15 July 1949 – 24 January 2005) was a Romanian footballer who played as a forward. He was "U" Craiova's top-scorer with 19 goals when the team won the 1973–74 Divizia A, which was the club's first trophy.

== Career ==
Bălan was born on 15 July 1949 in Perișor, Romania and began playing football in 1967 at Metalul Craiova. Subsequently, he moved to Universitatea Craiova, making his Divizia A debut on 6 April 1968 under coach Robert Cosmoc in a 2–0 away loss to Progresul București. On 11 March 1973, he and Ion Oblemenco each scored a hat-trick in a 6–4 victory against Rapid București. In that season, they were close to winning the title, but eventually finished in second place on equal points with Dinamo București, losing controversially on the goal difference. This outcome led poet Adrian Păunescu to nickname Craiova as "Campioana unei mari iubiri" (The Champion of a great love). He played three games in the 1973–74 UEFA Cup campaign, as "U" Craiova got past Fiorentina in the first round, being eliminated in the following one by Standard Liège against whom Bălan scored once. In the same season, he was part of Craiova's team that won the league title, which was the club's first trophy, and was the team's top-scorer with 19 goals netted in the 32 appearances under coach Constantin Cernăianu. Among these goals, two were scored on 28 April 1974 in a 3–1 win over Rapid which earned important points for the team. In 1975 he went to play in Divizia B for Petrolul Ploiești. Subsequently, Bălan joined Jiul Petroșani where on 26 October 1975 he made his last Divizia A appearance in a 3–0 away loss to Bihor Oradea, totaling 129 matches with 26 goals in the competition. He also has a total of four matches with one goal scored in European competitions (including one appearance in the Inter-Cities Fairs Cup). Bălan ended his career after playing during the 1976–77 Divizia B season for Electroputere Craiova.

== Death ==
Bălan died on 24 January 2005 at age 55.

== Honours ==
Universitatea Craiova

- Divizia A: 1973–74
