= 1960–61 Regional Championship =

19th season of the Liga IV, the fourth tier of the Romanian football league

Liga IV
- Season: 1960–61

The 1960–61 Regional Championship was the 19th season of the Regional Championship, 8th as the third tier of Romanian football. The champions of each regional championships play against each other in the play-offs to gain promotion in Divizia B.

== Regional championships ==
- Argeș (AG)
- Bacău (BC)
- Banat (BA)
- Brașov (BV)
- Bucharest Municipality (B)
- Bucharest Region (B)
- Cluj (CJ)
- Crișana (CR)
- Dobrogea (DO)
- Galați (GL)
- Hunedoara (HD)
- Iași (IS)
- Maramureș (MM)
- Mureș (MS)
- Oltenia (OL)
- Ploiești (PL)
- Suceava (SV)

== Promotion play-off ==
Seventeen teams participate in the promotion tournament. The teams were divided into two groups of six and one of five, and the first two ranked teams from each group promoted to second division. The matches were played on neutral ground at Râmnicu Vâlcea, Sibiu and Sinaia.

=== Series I (Râmnicu Vâlcea) ===
Table

Pos	Team	Pld	W	D	L	GF	GA	GD	Pts	Qualification
1	Știința Galați (GL) (P)	4	3	1	0	12	2	+10	7	Promotion to Divizia B
2	Ceahlăul Piatra Neamț (BC) (P)	4	3	0	1	11	6	+5	6	Promotion to Divizia B
3	IMU Medgidia (DO)	4	2	1	1	9	4	+5	5	
4	Penicilina Iași (IS)	4	1	0	3	6	13	−7	2	
5	ASM Rădăuți (SV)	4	0	0	4	3	16	−13	0	

Rules for classification: 1) points; 2) goal difference; 3) number of goals scored.
(P) Promoted

Results

8 July 1961	Știința Galați	2–1	Ceahlăul Piatra Neamț	Râmnicu Vâlcea

8 July 1961	IMU Medgidia	3–0	ASM Rădăuți	Râmnicu Vâlcea

13 July 1961	Știința Galați	6–0	ASM Rădăuți	Râmnicu Vâlcea

13 July 1961	Penicilina Iași	1–3	Ceahlăul Piatra Neamț	Râmnicu Vâlcea

16 July 1961	Penicilina Iași	2–1	ASM Rădăuți	Râmnicu Vâlcea

16 July 1961	IMU Medgidia	0–0	Știința Galați	Râmnicu Vâlcea

20 July 1961	Penicilina Iași	2–5	IMU Medgidia	Râmnicu Vâlcea

20 July 1961	Ceahlăul Piatra Neamț	5–2	ASM Rădăuți	Râmnicu Vâlcea

23 July 1961	Ceahlăul Piatra Neamț	2–1	IMU Medgidia	Râmnicu Vâlcea

23 July 1961	Știința Galați	4–1	Penicilina Iași	Râmnicu Vâlcea

=== Series II (Sibiu) ===
Table

Pos	Team	Pld	W	D	L	GF	GA	GD	Pts	Qualification
1	CFR Arad (BA) (P)	5	5	0	0	13	3	+10	10	Promotion to Divizia B
2	Carpați Sinaia (PL) (P)	5	2	2	1	5	5	0	6	Promotion to Divizia B
3	Dunărea Giurgiu (B)	5	2	2	1	5	7	−2	6	
4	Flacăra Roșie București (B)	5	2	1	2	8	7	+1	5	
5	Muscelul IMS Câmpulung (AG)	5	1	1	3	10	13	−3	3	
6	Dinamo Craiova (OT)	5	0	0	5	5	11	−6	0	

Rules for classification: 1) points; 2) goal difference; 3) number of goals scored.
(P) Promoted

Results

8 July 1961	Dunărea Giurgiu	1–0	Flacăra Roșie București	Sibiu

8 July 1961	CFR Arad	2–1	Dinamo Craiova	Sibiu

8 July 1961	Carpați Sinaia	1–0	Muscelul IMS Câmpulung	Sibiu

12 July 1961	Flacăra Roșie București	2–1	Dinamo Craiova	Sibiu

13 July 1961	Muscelul IMS Câmpulung	3–3	Dunărea Giurgiu	Sibiu

13 July 1961	CFR Arad	3–1	Carpați Sinaia	Sibiu

15 July 1961	CFR Arad	4–0	Dunărea Giurgiu	Sibiu

16 July 1961	Flacăra Roșie București	5–2	Muscelul IMS Câmpulung	Sibiu

16 July 1961	Carpați Sinaia	2–1	Dinamo Craiova	Sibiu

19 July 1961	Dinamo Craiova	2–4	Muscelul IMS Câmpulung	Sibiu

20 July 1961	CFR Arad	2–0	Flacăra Roșie București	Sibiu

20 July 1961	Carpați Sinaia	0–0	Dunărea Giurgiu	Sibiu

23 July 1961	Flacăra Roșie București	1–1	Carpați Sinaia	Sibiu

23 July 1961	Dunărea Giurgiu	1–0	Dinamo Craiova	Sibiu

23 July 1961	Muscelul IMS Câmpulung	1–2	CFR Arad	Sibiu

=== Series III (Sinaia) ===
Table

Pos	Team	Pld	W	D	L	GF	GA	GD	Pts	Qualification
1	Rapid IRA Târgu Mureș (MS) (P)	5	3	2	0	9	5	+4	8	Promotion to Divizia B
2	Crișul Oradea (CR) (P)	5	1	4	0	7	4	+3	6	Promotion to Divizia B
3	Soda Ocna Mureș (CJ)	5	1	3	1	6	4	+2	5	
4	Metrom Brașov (BV)	5	1	2	2	10	12	−2	4	
5	Minerul Deva (HD)	5	1	2	2	8	10	−2	4	
6	Voința Satu Mare (MM)	5	1	1	3	8	13	−5	3	

Rules for classification: 1) points; 2) goal difference; 3) number of goals scored.
(P) Promoted

Results

8 July 1961	Voința Satu Mare	3–1	Minerul Deva	Sinaia

8 July 1961	Crișul Oradea	1–1	Rapid IRA Târgu Mureș	Sinaia

25 July 1961	Soda Ocna Mureș	1–2	Metrom Brașov	Sinaia

12 July 1961	Rapid IRA Târgu Mureș	2–1	Voința Satu Mare	Sinaia

13 July 1961	Metrom Brașov	2–2	Crișul Oradea	Sinaia

13 July 1961	Minerul Deva	1–1	Soda Ocna Mureș	Sinaia

15 July 1961	Crișul Oradea	1–1	Minerul Deva	Sinaia

16 July 1961	Rapid IRA Târgu Mureș	3–1	Metrom Brașov	Sinaia

16 July 1961	Soda Ocna Mureș	4–1	Voința Satu Mare	Sinaia

19 July 1961	Minerul Deva	3–2	Rapid IRA Târgu Mureș	Sinaia

20 July 1961	Soda Ocna Mureș	0–0	Crișul Oradea	Sinaia

20 July 1962	Voința Satu Mare	3–3	Metrom Brașov	Sinaia

22 July 1961	Rapid IRA Târgu Mureș	0–0	Soda Ocna Mureș	Sinaia

23 July 1961	Crișul Oradea	3–0	Voința Satu Mare	Sinaia

23 July 1961	Metrom Brașov	2–3	Minerul Deva	Sinaia

== Championship standings ==
=== Argeș Region ===
Series I

Pos	Team	Pld	W	D	L	GF	GA	GD	Pts	Qualification or relegation
1	Muscelul IMS Câmpulung (Q)	23	20	2	1	94	10	+84	42	Qualification to championship final
2	Metalul Colibași	23	18	3	2	83	15	+68	39	
3	Minerul Câmpulung	23	15	2	6	82	31	+51	32	
4	Rapid Pitești	23	13	4	6	50	28	+22	30	
5	Argeșul Curtea de Argeș	23	11	4	8	33	30	+3	26	
6	Forestierul Stâlpeni	23	10	2	11	44	56	−12	22	
7	Progresul Băiculești	23	9	1	13	50	48	+2	19	
8	Textilistul Pitești	23	8	3	12	33	45	−12	19	
9	Progresul Găești	23	8	2	13	45	55	−10	18	
10	Moneda Pitești	23	6	3	14	36	94	−58	15	
11	Electrica Câmpulung	23	4	2	17	18	79	−61	10	
12	Unirea Costești	23	2	5	16	26	70	−44	9	
13	Progresul Topoloveni (Note: Progresul Topoloveni was excluded before the second half of the season.) (D)	12	4	0	8	24	25	−1	8	Excluded

Rules for classification: 1) points; 2) goal difference; 3) number of goals scored.
(D) Disqualified; (Q) Qualified for the phase indicated
Notes:

Series II

Pos	Team	Pld	W	D	L	GF	GA	GD	Pts	Qualification or relegation
1	Unirea Drăgășani (Q)	22	11	5	6	58	31	+27	27	Qualification to championship final
2	Oltul Slatina	22	11	5	6	50	37	+13	27	
3	Rapid Piatra-Olt	22	10	4	8	43	31	+12	24	
4	Oltul Râmnicu Vâlcea	22	10	4	8	42	36	+6	24	
5	Lotru Brezoi	22	9	5	8	43	32	+11	23	
6	Recolta Stoicănești	22	10	3	9	46	43	+3	23	
7	Victoria Slatina	22	8	6	8	30	28	+2	22	
8	Oltul Drăgănești-Olt	22	9	2	11	40	47	−7	20	
9	Unirea Potcoava	22	9	2	11	37	47	−10	20	
10	Unirea Horezu (Note: Avântul Horezu was renamed during the winter break as Unirea Horezu.)	22	6	7	9	38	46	−8	19	
11	CSA Râmnicu Vâlcea	22	6	6	10	30	50	−20	18	
12	Dinamo Drăgășani	22	7	3	12	32	52	−20	17	
13	Forestierul Băbeni (Note: Forestierul Băbeni was excluded in the first half of the season and all its results were canceled.) (D)	0	0	0	0	0	0	0	0	Excluded

Rules for classification: 1) points; 2) goal difference; 3) number of goals scored.
(D) Disqualified; (Q) Qualified for the phase indicated
Notes:

Championship final

Team 1	Agg.	Team 2	1st leg	2nd leg
Unirea Drăgășani	2–6	Muscelul IMS Câmpulung	2–2	0–4

Muscelul IMS Câmpulung won the Argeș Regional Championship and qualify for promotion play-off in Divizia B.

=== Bacău Region ===
Series I

Pos	Team	Pld	W	D	L	GF	GA	GD	Pts	Qualification or relegation
1	Ceahlăul Piatra Neamț (Q)	18	12	2	4	56	20	+36	26	Qualification to championship final
2	Laminorul Roman	18	11	3	4	35	16	+19	25	
3	Victoria Piatra Neamț	18	11	1	6	45	25	+20	23	
4	Bradul Roznov	18	10	2	6	48	27	+21	22	
5	Partizanul Bacău	18	9	2	7	22	33	−11	20	
6	Victoria Roman	18	8	3	7	30	27	+3	19	
7	Celuloza Piatra Neamț	18	6	4	8	21	30	−9	16	
8	Cimentul Bicaz	18	6	2	10	21	51	−30	14	
9	Avântul Buhuși	18	4	4	10	18	46	−28	12	
10	Bradul Târgu Neamț	18	1	1	16	7	48	−41	3	

Rules for classification: 1) points; 2) goal difference; 3) number of goals scored.
(Q) Qualified for the phase indicated

Series II

Pos	Team	Pld	W	D	L	GF	GA	GD	Pts	Qualification or relegation
1	Textila Buhuși (Q)	18	12	4	2	54	11	+43	28	Qualification to championship final
2	Minerul Comănești	18	12	1	5	47	23	+24	25	
3	Petrolistul Dărmănești	18	9	4	5	36	27	+9	22	
4	Gloria Zemeș	18	10	2	6	23	18	+5	22	
5	Petrolul Moinești	18	8	2	8	38	34	+4	18	
6	Victoria Bacău	18	4	7	7	25	31	−6	15	
7	Chimia Onești	18	5	4	9	27	48	−21	14	
8	Oituz Târgu Ocna	18	5	3	10	31	40	−9	13	
9	Locomotiva Adjud	17	4	3	10	22	37	−15	11	
10	Bradul HCC Bacău	17	4	1	12	18	52	−34	9	

Rules for classification: 1) points; 2) goal difference; 3) number of goals scored.
(Q) Qualified for the phase indicated

Championship final

All matches were played at 23 August Stadium in Bacău on 4, 11 and 16 June 1961.

Team 1	Series	Team 2	Game 1	Game 2	Game 3
Ceahlăul Piatra Neamț	6–4	Textila Buhuși	3–3	1–1	2–0

Ceahlăul Piatra Neamț won the Bacău Regional Championship and qualify to promotion play-off in Divizia B.

=== Banat Region ===
Series I

Pos	Team	Pld	W	D	L	GF	GA	GD	Pts	Qualification or relegation
1	CFR Arad (Q)	26	18	4	4	78	23	+55	40	Qualification to championship final
2	Electromotor Timișoara	26	13	5	8	37	33	+4	31	
3	Stăruința Timișoara	26	11	7	8	49	43	+6	29	
4	Tehnometal Timișoara	26	11	6	9	35	40	−5	28	
5	ICA Arad	26	11	5	10	49	48	+1	27	
6	Ceramica Jimbolia	26	10	6	10	44	43	+1	26	
7	Victoria Lipova	26	8	10	8	26	28	−2	26	
8	Banatul FZ Timișoara	26	9	8	9	33	42	−9	26	
9	Teba Arad	26	9	7	10	39	36	+3	25	
10	Șoimii Timișoara	26	11	2	13	47	45	+2	24	
11	Unirea Sânnicolau Mare	26	9	5	12	36	48	−12	23	
12	Recolta Jimbolia	26	8	5	13	41	54	−13	21	
13	Progresul Timișoara	26	8	4	14	36	45	−9	20	
14	Progresul Pecica	26	7	4	15	32	54	−22	18	

Rules for classification: 1) points; 2) goal difference; 3) number of goals scored.
(Q) Qualified for the phase indicated

Series II

Pos	Team	Pld	W	D	L	GF	GA	GD	Pts	Qualification or relegation
1	Metalul Oțelu Roșu (Q)	26	19	3	4	60	17	+43	41	Qualification to championship final
2	Oravița	26	16	8	2	49	17	+32	40	
3	Olimpia Reșița	26	14	6	6	45	25	+20	34	
4	Metalul Bocșa	26	12	7	7	56	33	+23	31	
5	Minerul Anina	26	10	7	9	42	42	0	27	
6	CFR Caransebeș	26	10	5	11	41	36	+5	25	
7	Progresul Gătaia	26	10	4	12	40	48	−8	24	
8	Porțile de Fier Orșova	26	10	3	13	41	53	−12	23	
9	Isvorul Bocșa	26	10	3	13	34	49	−15	23	
10	Furnirul Deta	26	8	6	12	38	40	−2	22	
11	Progresul Ciacova	26	8	6	12	40	48	−8	22	
12	ASM Lugoj	26	8	6	12	33	44	−11	22	
13	Muncitorul Reșița	26	5	8	13	31	52	−21	18	
14	Cadarca Recaș	26	2	8	16	19	65	−46	12	

Rules for classification: 1) points; 2) goal difference; 3) number of goals scored.
(Q) Qualified for the phase indicated

Championship final

Team 1	Agg.	Team 2	1st leg	2nd leg
Metalul Oțelu Roșu	1–2	CFR Arad	1–0	0–2

CFR Arad won the Banat Regional Championship and qualify to promotion play-off in Divizia B.

=== Brașov Region ===
Series I

Pos	Team	Pld	W	D	L	GF	GA	GD	Pts	Qualification or relegation
1	Metrom Brașov (Q)	22	15	6	1	57	21	+36	36	Qualification to championship play-off
2	Rulmentul Brașov	22	13	4	5	65	24	+41	30	
3	Precizia Săcele	22	12	3	7	41	34	+7	27	
4	Torpedo Zărnești	22	11	4	7	43	32	+11	26	
5	Celuloza Zărnești	22	8	7	7	33	33	0	23	
6	Măgura Codlea	22	10	2	10	27	38	−11	22	
7	Flamura Roșie Lunca Câlnicului	22	7	7	8	30	30	0	21	
8	Flamura Roșie Bod	22	8	5	9	37	38	−1	21	
9	Strungul Brașov	22	6	7	9	27	38	−11	19	
10	Politehnica Brașov	22	6	6	10	25	38	−13	18	
11	Colorom Codlea	22	4	4	14	23	45	−22	12	
12	Dinamo Brașov	22	2	5	15	24	61	−37	9	

Rules for classification: 1) points; 2) goal difference; 3) number of goals scored.
(Q) Qualified for the phase indicated

Series II

Pos	Team	Pld	W	D	L	GF	GA	GD	Pts	Qualification or relegation
1	ASA Sibiu (Q)	22	16	4	2	47	16	+31	36	Qualification to championship play-off
2	Elastic Sibiu	22	13	4	5	45	20	+25	30	
3	Textila Cisnădie	22	13	1	8	50	31	+19	27	
4	Progresul Făgăraș	22	11	4	7	52	34	+18	26	
5	Sinteza Victoria	22	8	5	9	53	33	+20	21	
6	CFR Sibiu	22	8	5	9	37	34	+3	21	
7	Firul Roșu Tălmaciu	22	9	3	10	40	37	+3	21	
8	Metalul IO Sibiu	22	7	6	9	43	39	+4	20	
9	Chimia Făgăraș II	22	8	2	12	28	52	−24	18	
10	Unirea Victoria	22	4	8	10	33	50	−17	16	
11	Progresul Agnita	22	7	1	14	25	66	−41	15	
12	Unirea Rupea	22	5	3	14	32	73	−41	13	

Rules for classification: 1) points; 2) goal difference; 3) number of goals scored.
(Q) Qualified for the phase indicated

Series III

Pos	Team	Pld	W	D	L	GF	GA	GD	Pts	Qualification or relegation
1	Faianța Sighișoara (Q)	22	16	3	3	59	30	+29	35	Qualification to championship play-off
2	Sparta Mediaș	22	13	4	5	43	18	+25	30	
3	Voința Târnăveni	22	12	5	5	50	25	+25	29	
4	Textila Mediaș	22	10	8	4	50	27	+23	28	
5	Vitrometan Mediaș	22	9	8	5	35	22	+13	26	
6	Chimica Târnăveni	22	8	7	7	35	33	+2	23	
7	Victoria Copșa Mică	22	7	8	7	33	19	+14	22	
8	Record Mediaș	22	8	5	9	30	30	0	21	
9	Voința Blaj	22	6	4	12	33	51	−18	16	
10	Sticla Târnăveni	22	7	1	14	25	55	−30	15	
11	Stăruința Mediaș	22	3	4	15	17	53	−36	10	
12	Nicovala Sighișoara	22	3	3	16	19	66	−47	9	

Rules for classification: 1) points; 2) goal difference; 3) number of goals scored.
(Q) Qualified for the phase indicated

Championship play-off

The championship play-off was played between the winner of each Brașov regional series and the winner of Series II from Mureș Region (as the Sfântu Gheorghe district passed to Brașov Region, following the administrative-territorial reorganization from December 1960). All matches were played at Făgăraș, on 18 June 1961 (the semi-finals) and 22 June 1961 (the final). The championship final was replayed on 9 July 1961 at Victoria.

Semi-finals

Team 1	Score	Team 2
Metrom Brașov	1–0	Textila Sfântu Gheorghe
Faianța Sighișoara	1–3	ASA Sibiu

Final

Team 1	Score	Team 2
Metrom Brașov	1–0 (Note: The initial result of the match, 1–2, was canceled following an appeal.)	ASA Sibiu

Metrom Brașov won the Brașov Regional Championship and qualify to promotion play-off in Divizia B.

=== Bucharest Municipality ===
Series I

Pos	Team	Pld	W	D	L	GF	GA	GD	Pts	Qualification or relegation
1	Flacăra Roșie București (Q)	22	13	5	4	39	23	+16	31	Qualification to championship final
2	FRB București	22	10	8	4	38	29	+9	28	
3	Bumbacul București	22	10	7	5	44	31	+13	27	
4	Abatorul București	21	10	6	5	24	12	+12	26	
5	Voința București	22	9	6	7	37	25	+12	24	
6	Confecția București	21	7	8	6	38	34	+4	22	
7	CPB București	22	9	4	9	34	27	+7	22	
8	Vulcan București	22	3	12	7	20	26	−6	18	
9	Constructorul București	22	7	3	12	33	42	−9	17	
10	Icar București	22	4	9	9	20	40	−20	17	
11	Chimia București	22	5	6	11	26	44	−18	16	
12	IOR București	22	3	8	11	22	42	−20	14	

Rules for classification: 1) points; 2) goal difference; 3) number of goals scored.
(Q) Qualified for the phase indicated

Series II

Pos	Team	Pld	W	D	L	GF	GA	GD	Pts	Qualification or relegation
1	Rapid București II (Q)	22	17	3	2	57	21	+36	37	Qualification to championship final
2	Tehnometal București	22	11	7	4	41	20	+21	29	
3	ITB București	22	11	6	5	37	24	+13	28	
4	CFR București	22	11	3	8	40	37	+3	25	
5	Timpuri Noi București	22	9	5	8	32	26	+6	23	
6	Vestitorul București	22	7	6	9	27	31	−4	20	
7	Sirena București	22	7	6	9	18	24	−6	20	
8	Ulei București	22	7	4	11	23	45	−22	18	
9	Quadrat București	22	7	3	12	27	35	−8	17	
10	ICAB București	22	6	5	11	26	39	−13	17	
11	Dinamo B București	22	7	1	14	31	39	−8	15	
12	ICSIM București	22	4	7	11	19	36	−17	15	

Rules for classification: 1) points; 2) goal difference; 3) number of goals scored.
(Q) Qualified for the phase indicated

Championship final

The matches was played on 17 June 1961 at Giulești Stadium and 24 June 1961 at Flacăra Roșie Stadium.

Team 1	Agg.	Team 2	1st leg	2nd leg
Rapid București II	2–3	Flacăra Roșie București	2–2	0–1

Flacăra Roșie București won the Bucharest Municipal Championship and qualify to promotion play-off in Divizia B.

=== Bucharest Region ===
Championship final

Team 1	Agg.	Team 2	1st leg	2nd leg
Olimpia Giurgiu	1–2	Dunărea Giurgiu	1–0	0–2

Dunărea Giurgiu won the Bucharest Regional Championship and qualify to promotion play-off in Divizia B.

=== Crișana Region ===
North Series

Pos	Team	Pld	W	D	L	GF	GA	GD	Pts	Qualification or relegation
1	Crișul Oradea (Q)	22	19	2	1	95	12	+83	40	Qualification to championship final
2	Rapid Oradea	22	16	3	3	76	25	+51	35	
3	Spartac Valea lui Mihai	22	13	5	4	55	33	+22	31	
4	Minerul Șuncuiuș	22	12	3	7	55	46	+9	27	
5	Dinamo Oradea	22	9	5	8	30	37	−7	23	
6	Minerul Sărmășag	22	10	2	10	52	42	+10	22	
7	Stăruința Săcuieni	22	8	4	10	51	58	−7	20	
8	Electrolemn Oradea	22	6	5	11	23	42	−19	17	
9	Măgura Șimleu Silvaniei	22	7	2	13	37	50	−13	16	
10	Victoria Marghita	22	5	5	12	35	74	−39	15	
11	Recolta Diosig	22	4	2	16	27	63	−36	10	
12	Minerul Derna	22	3	2	17	24	74	−50	8	

Rules for classification: 1) Points; 2) Goal difference; 3) Number of goals scored.
(Q) Qualified for the phase indicated

South Series

Pos	Team	Pld	W	D	L	GF	GA	GD	Pts	Qualification or relegation
1	Voința Oradea (Q)	22	13	5	4	55	25	+30	31	Qualification to championship final
2	Stăruința Salonta	22	12	4	6	45	21	+24	28	
3	Flamura Roșie Oradea	22	10	6	6	43	27	+16	26	
4	Crișul Ineu	22	9	7	6	31	20	+11	25	
5	Victoria Chișineu-Criș	22	12	1	9	33	33	0	25	
6	Dinamo Dr. Petru Groza	22	11	2	9	33	29	+4	24	
7	Unirea Sântana	22	9	2	11	37	51	−14	20	
8	Blănuri Oradea	22	9	1	12	41	50	−9	19	
9	Drapelul Roșu Salonta	22	8	2	12	36	44	−8	18	
10	Crișana Sebiș	22	8	2	12	34	47	−13	18	
11	Avântul Beliu	22	8	1	13	38	62	−24	17	
12	Stejarul Beiuș (Note: Bihorul Beiuș was renamed Stejarul Beiuș during the winter break.)	22	3	7	12	18	35	−17	13	

Rules for classification: 1) Points; 2) Goal difference; 3) Number of goals scored.
(Q) Qualified for the phase indicated
Notes:

Championship final

The matches were played on 18 and 25 June 1961 at Libertății Stadium in Oradea.

Team 1	Agg.	Team 2	1st leg	2nd leg
Crișul Oradea	2–1	Voința Oradea	1–0	1–1

Crișul Oradea won the Crișana Regional Championship and qualify to promotion play-off in Divizia C.

=== Dobrogea Region ===
East Series

Pos	Team	Pld	W	D	L	GF	GA	GD	Pts	Qualification or relegation
1	Ancora Constanța (Q)	16	12	2	2	51	15	+36	26	Qualification to championship play-off
2	Steaua Mangalia	16	11	2	3	0	0	0	24	
3	Electrica Constanța	16	9	5	2	0	0	0	23	
4	Dinamo Constanța	16	8	1	7	0	0	0	17	
5	Spartac Constanța	16	6	4	6	0	0	0	16	
6	Recolta Negru Vodă	16	7	1	8	0	0	0	15	
7	CFR Constanța	16	6	2	8	0	0	0	14	
8	Avântul Constanța	16	3	3	10	0	0	0	9	
9	Recolta Cobadin	16	0	0	16	0	0	0	0	
10	Marina Constanța (D)	0	0	0	0	0	0	0	0	Withdrew

Rules for classification: 1) points; 2) goal difference; 3) number of goals scored.
(D) Disqualified; (Q) Qualified for the phase indicated

Center Series

Pos	Team	Pld	W	D	L	GF	GA	GD	Pts	Qualification or relegation
1	IMU Medgidia (Q)	18	16	1	1	82	14	+68	33	Qualification to championship play-off
2	Cimentul Medgidia	18	12	3	3	0	0	0	27	
3	Ideal Cernavodă	18	9	8	1	0	0	0	26	
4	Victoria Saligny	18	7	7	4	0	0	0	21	
5	Locomotiva Fetești	18	8	3	7	0	0	0	19	
6	Locomotiva Medgidia	18	5	5	8	0	0	0	15	
7	Recolta Murfatlar	18	5	4	9	0	0	0	14	
8	Dunărea Fetești	18	4	4	10	0	0	0	12	
9	Recolta Hagieni	18	2	3	13	0	0	0	7	
10	Secera și Ciocanul Ioan Corvin	18	3	0	15	0	0	0	6	

Rules for classification: 1) points; 2) goal difference; 3) number of goals scored.
(Q) Qualified for the phase indicated

North Series

Pos	Team	Pld	W	D	L	GF	GA	GD	Pts	Qualification or relegation
1	Steaua Tulcea	16	11	5	0	67	7	+60	27	Qualification to championship play-off
2	Vulturul Tulcea	16	12	3	1	0	0	0	27	
3	Răsăritul Sulina	16	9	3	4	0	0	0	21	
4	Granitul Babadag	16	6	3	7	0	0	0	15	
5	Înfrățirea Cogealac	16	6	2	8	0	0	0	14	
6	Voința Măcin	16	5	3	8	0	0	0	13	
7	Tractorul Horia	16	6	0	10	0	0	0	12	
8	Pescărușul Hârșova	16	4	1	11	0	0	0	9	
9	Rapid Casimcea	16	3	0	13	0	0	0	6	
10	Dinamo Salcia (D)	0	0	0	0	0	0	0	0	Withdrew

Rules for classification: 1) points; 2) goal difference; 3) number of goals scored.
(D) Disqualified

Championship play-off

The championship play-off was contested in a double round-robin tournament featuring the winners of the three regional series.

Pos	Team	Pld	W	D	L	GF	GA	GD	Pts	Qualification
1	IMU Medgidia (C, Q)	4	4	0	0	11	1	+10	12	Qualification to promotion play-off
2	Ancora Constanța	4	2	0	2	6	2	+4	6	
3	Steaua Tulcea	4	0	0	4	1	15	−14	0	

Rules for classification: 1) Points; 2) Goal difference; 3) Number of goals scored.
(C) Champions; (Q) Qualified for the phase indicated

Results

21 May 1961	Steaua Tulcea	1–4	IMU Medgidia

24 May 1961	Ancora Constanța	3–0	Steaua Tulcea

4 June 1961	IMU Medgidia	1–0	Ancora Constanța

11 June 1961	IMU Medgidia	5–0	Steaua Tulcea

18 June 1961	Steaua Tulcea	0–3	Ancora Constanța

24 June 1961	Ancora Constanța	0–1	IMU Medgidia

=== Galați Region ===
Series I

Pos	Team	Pld	W	D	L	GF	GA	GD	Pts	Qualification or relegation
1	Marina Brăila (Q)	24	19	3	2	91	18	+73	41	Qualification to championship final
2	Ancora Galați	24	18	3	3	80	19	+61	39	
3	Dunărea Brăila	24	15	5	4	49	14	+35	35	
4	Gloria Tecuci	24	14	4	6	48	34	+14	32	
5	Mecanizatorul Făurei	24	13	3	8	79	39	+40	29	
6	Metalosport Galați	24	10	3	11	37	37	0	23	
7	Tractorul Viziru	24	10	2	12	37	39	−2	22	
8	Recolta Ianca	24	8	5	11	32	35	−3	21	
9	Tractorul Nănești	24	8	3	13	43	53	−10	19	
10	Tractorul Balta Albă	24	7	5	12	29	71	−42	19	
11	Tractorul Cioara	24	7	1	16	42	64	−22	15	
12	Celuloza Brăila	24	6	3	15	31	64	−33	15	
13	Gloria Băleni	24	1	0	23	9	120	−111	2	

Rules for classification: 1) points; 2) goal difference; 3) number of goals scored.
(Q) Qualified for the phase indicated

Series II

Pos	Team	Pld	W	D	L	GF	GA	GD	Pts	Qualification or relegation
1	Știința Galați (Q)	26	20	4	2	100	10	+90	44	Qualification to championship final
2	Trefilatorul Brăila	26	16	4	6	57	32	+25	36	
3	Recolta Măicănești	26	14	6	6	36	28	+8	34	
4	Progresul Brăila	26	14	5	7	79	30	+49	33	
5	Voința Focșani	26	12	6	8	56	42	+14	30	
6	Flamura Roșie Tecuci	26	12	5	9	54	45	+9	29	
7	Voința Galați	26	12	5	9	43	47	−4	29	
8	Chimica Mărășești	26	11	5	10	41	37	+4	27	
9	Muncitorul Ghidigeni	26	11	3	12	55	55	0	25	
10	Recolta Ivești	26	9	5	12	32	51	−19	23	
11	Victoria Gugești	26	8	3	15	40	62	−22	19	
12	Viticultorul Panciu	26	7	4	15	30	61	−31	18	
13	Tractorul Tecuci	26	2	7	17	26	86	−60	11	
14	Electrica Galați	26	2	2	22	23	86	−63	6	

Rules for classification: 1) points; 2) goal difference; 3) number of goals scored.
(Q) Qualified for the phase indicated

Championship final

Team 1	Agg.	Team 2	1st leg	2nd leg
Marina Brăila	1–5	Știința Galați	1–3	0–2

Știința Galați won the Galați Regional Championship and qualify to promotion play-off in Divizia B.

=== Hunedoara Region ===
Series I

Pos	Team	Pld	W	D	L	GF	GA	GD	Pts	Qualification or relegation
1	Minerul Vulcan (Q)	18	14	0	4	40	17	+23	28	Qualification to championship final
2	Minerul Aninoasa	18	11	4	3	49	14	+35	26	
3	Victoria Călan	18	10	4	4	43	25	+18	24	
4	Parângul Lonea	18	10	1	7	41	22	+19	21	
5	Minerul Petrila	18	8	4	6	40	25	+15	20	
6	CFR Simeria	18	6	3	9	26	36	−10	15	
7	Minerul Ghelari	18	7	0	11	32	51	−19	14	
8	Retezatul Hațeg	18	5	3	10	21	37	−16	13	
9	Șantierul ICSH Hunedoara	18	3	4	11	14	51	−37	10	
10	Rapid Deva (Note: Rapid Deva was absorbed by Minerul Deva after 10 rounds and lost all remaining matches with 0–3.)	18	3	3	12	18	46	−28	9	
11	Corvinul Hunedoara II (Note: Corvinul Hunedoara II was absorbed by Șantierul ICSH Hunedoara after 10 rounds and all its results were canceled.) (D)	0	0	0	0	0	0	0	0	Withdrew
12	Horia Cristur (Note: Horia Cristur was excluded after 6 rounds and all its results were canceled.) (D)	0	0	0	0	0	0	0	0	Withdrew

Rules for classification: 1) points; 2) goal difference; 3) number of goals scored.
(D) Disqualified; (Q) Qualified for the phase indicated
Notes:

Series II

Pos	Team	Pld	W	D	L	GF	GA	GD	Pts	Qualification or relegation
1	Minerul Deva (Q)	22	21	1	0	107	8	+99	43	Qualification to championship final
2	Metalurgistul Cugir	22	18	2	2	86	16	+70	38	
3	Dacia Orăștie	22	14	2	6	73	34	+39	30	
4	ASTA Alba Iulia	22	13	1	8	74	32	+42	27	
5	CFR Teiuș	22	13	1	8	47	48	−1	27	
6	Sebeșul Sebeș	22	12	1	9	46	44	+2	25	
7	Metalul Crișcior	22	12	0	10	41	39	+2	24	
8	Aurul Zlatna	22	8	4	10	40	46	−6	20	
9	Aurul Certej	22	7	0	15	32	60	−28	14	
10	Mureșul Vințu de Jos	22	3	2	17	27	74	−47	8	
11	Șurianul Petrești (Note: Șurianul Petrești was absorbed by Sebeșul Sebeș after 19 rounds and lost all remaining matches with 0–3.)	22	1	2	19	12	87	−75	4	
12	Victoria Dobra	22	2	0	20	15	112	−97	4	

Rules for classification: 1) points; 2) goal difference; 3) number of goals scored.
(Q) Qualified for the phase indicated
Notes:

Championship final

Team 1	Agg.	Team 2	1st leg	2nd leg
Minerul Vulcan	1–4	Minerul Deva	1–1	0–3

Minerul Deva won the Hunedoara Regional Championship and qualify to promotion play-off in Divizia B.

=== Mureș Region ===
Series I

Pos	Team	Pld	W	D	L	GF	GA	GD	Pts	Qualification or relegation
1	Rapid IRA Târgu Mureș (Q)	24	18	5	1	82	11	+71	41	Qualification to championship final
2	Avântul Reghin	24	19	2	3	80	18	+62	40	
3	Stăruința Cristuru Secuiesc	24	13	4	7	37	26	+11	30	
4	Gloria Târgu Mureș	24	12	4	8	54	23	+31	28	
5	Lemnarul Târgu Mureș	24	10	7	7	43	36	+7	27	
6	Ciocanul Târgu Mureș	24	11	5	8	48	44	+4	27	
7	Energia Fântânele	24	10	3	11	37	51	−14	23	
8	Cablul Târgu Mureș	24	8	4	12	40	47	−7	20	
9	Producția Reghin	24	9	2	13	33	46	−13	20	
10	Mureșul Toplița	24	8	3	13	21	44	−23	19	
11	Viitorul Apalina	24	5	5	14	24	66	−42	15	
12	Borsecul Borsec	24	5	3	16	23	56	−33	13	
13	Avântul Sovata	24	1	7	16	23	77	−54	9	

Rules for classification: 1) points; 2) goal difference; 3) number of goals scored.
(Q) Qualified for the phase indicated

Series II

Pos	Team	Pld	W	D	L	GF	GA	GD	Pts	Qualification or relegation
1	Textila Sfântu Gheorghe (Q)	26	26	0	0	116	16	+100	52	Qualification to Brașov championship play-off (Note: Textila Sfântu Gheorghe qualified for Brașov championship play-off, and ASM Odorheiu Secuiesc qualified for Mureș regional championship final, as the Sfântu Gheorghe district passed to Brașov Region, following the administrative-territorial reorganization from December 1960.)
2	ASM Odorheiu Secuiesc (Q)	26	15	2	9	57	33	+24	32	Qualification to championship final
3	Avântul Comandău	26	16	2	8	72	49	+23	32 (Note: Avântul Comandău deducted 2 points.)	
4	KSE Târgu Secuiesc	26	14	3	9	65	39	+26	31	
5	Carpați Covasna	26	11	8	7	64	32	+32	30	
6	Avântul Odorheiu Secuiesc	26	13	0	13	57	48	+9	26	
7	Metalul Vlăhița	26	11	2	13	51	47	+4	24	
8	Minerul Bălan	26	9	5	12	36	77	−41	23	
9	Minerul Căpeni	26	10	2	14	38	73	−35	22	
10	Progresul Gheorgheni	26	6	8	12	39	52	−13	20	
11	Minerul Miercurea Ciuc	26	8	4	14	43	72	−29	20	
12	Șoimii Baraolt	26	7	5	14	38	57	−19	19	
13	Mureșul Remetea	26	6	5	15	44	64	−20	17	
14	Șoimii Băile Tușnad	26	7	0	19	27	88	−61	14	

Rules for classification: 1) points; 2) goal difference; 3) number of goals scored.
(Q) Qualified for the phase indicated
Notes:

Championship final

Team 1	Series	Team 2	Game 1	Game 2	Game 3
Rapid IRA Târgu Mureș	4–3	ASM Odorheiu Secuiesc	2–0	1–3 (Note: The match was played at Cristuru Secuiesc as the stadium from Odorheiu Secuiesc was suspended.)	1–0 (Note: The match was played on neutral ground at Gheorgheni.)

Rapid IRA Târgu Mureș won the Mureș Regional Championship and qualify to promotion play-off in Divizia B.

=== Oltenia Region ===
Series I

Pos	Team	Pld	W	D	L	GF	GA	GD	Pts	Qualification or relegation
1	CIL Târgu Jiu (Note: Preajba Târgu Jiu was renamed during the winter break as CIL Târgu Jiu.) (Q)	26	22	1	3	89	15	+74	45	Qualification to championship final
2	Unirea Târgu Jiu	26	17	5	4	79	31	+48	39	
3	Progresul Filiași	26	17	3	6	79	35	+44	37	
4	Metalul 7 Noiembrie Craiova	26	13	7	6	50	29	+21	33	
5	Metalurgistul Sadu	26	12	9	5	47	42	+5	33	
6	Progresul Strehaia	26	13	5	8	68	29	+39	31	
7	Dunărea Turnu Severin (Note: ASA Turnu Severin was renamed during the winter break as Dunărea Turnu Severin.)	26	14	2	10	66	34	+32	30	
8	Morile Unite Jiul Craiova	26	10	6	10	47	53	−6	26	
9	Progresul Turnu Severin	26	10	4	12	56	48	+8	24	
10	Munca Craiova	26	6	6	14	24	60	−36	18	
11	Constructorul Târgu Cărbunești	26	6	5	15	26	72	−46	17	
12	Cerna Baia de Aramă	26	6	2	18	30	81	−51	14	
13	Petrolul Țicleni	26	5	3	18	28	65	−37	13	
14	Porțile de Fier Ada-Kaleh	26	1	2	23	14	106	−92	4	

Rules for classification: 1) Points; 2) Goal difference; 3) Number of goals scored.
(Q) Qualified for the phase indicated
Notes:

Series II

Pos	Team	Pld	W	D	L	GF	GA	GD	Pts	Qualification or relegation
1	Dinamo Craiova (Q)	24	15	7	2	53	19	+34	37	Qualification to championship final
2	Petrolul Zătreni	24	15	3	6	39	18	+21	33	
3	Progresul Băilești	24	12	5	7	35	28	+7	29	
4	Progresul Segarcea	24	12	5	7	32	28	+4	29	
5	Progresul Balș	24	11	6	7	43	29	+14	28	
6	Dunărea Corabia	24	10	6	8	41	32	+9	26	
7	Unirea Vânători (Note: Unirea Vânători replaced Viitorul Cujmir during the winter break.)	24	9	5	10	35	43	−8	23	
8	Progresul Caracal	24	7	8	9	38	37	+1	22	
9	Progresul Balș	24	8	5	11	37	45	−8	21	
10	Recolta Urzicuța	24	6	6	12	27	40	−13	18	
11	Fulgerul Maglavit	24	8	1	15	33	56	−23	17	
12	Dunărea Calafat	24	6	5	13	27	35	−8	17	
13	Voința Caracal	24	4	4	16	30	60	−30	12	
14	Tractorul Bechet (Note: Tractorul Bechet withdrew in the first part of the season and all its results were canceled.) (D)	0	0	0	0	0	0	0	0	Withdrew

Rules for classification: 1) Points; 2) Goal difference; 3) Number of goals scored.
(D) Disqualified; (Q) Qualified for the phase indicated
Notes:

Championship final

Team 1	Agg.	Team 2	1st leg	2nd leg
CIL Târgu Jiu	3–5	Dinamo Craiova	1–2	2–3

Dinamo Craiova won the Craiova Regional Championship and qualify for promotion play-off in Divizia C.

=== Ploiești Region ===
Series I

Pos	Team	Pld	W	D	L	GF	GA	GD	Pts	Qualification or relegation
1	Voința Râmnicu Sărat (Q)	22	15	5	2	49	20	+29	35	Qualification to championship play-off
2	Rapid Mizil	22	16	2	4	63	15	+48	34	
3	Rapid Plopeni	22	14	6	2	69	27	+42	34	
4	Rapid Buzău	22	13	4	5	44	26	+18	30	
5	Geamuri Scăieni	22	9	9	4	41	30	+11	27	
6	Țapina Nehoiu	22	9	1	12	44	47	−3	19	
7	Chimistul Valea Călugărească	22	6	6	10	32	45	−13	18	
8	Partizanul Râmnicu Sărat	22	7	3	12	32	42	−10	17	
9	Petrolul Berca	22	5	5	12	28	37	−9	15	
10	GAC Sălciile	22	5	4	13	29	64	−35	14	
11	Viitorul Drajna de Jos	22	3	4	15	25	72	−47	10	
12	Chimia Buzău (Note: Chimia Buzău withdrew from championship.) (D)	0	0	0	0	0	0	0	0	Withdrew

Rules for classification: 1) points; 2) goal difference; 3) number of goals scored.
(D) Disqualified; (Q) Qualified for the phase indicated
Notes:

Series II

Pos	Team	Pld	W	D	L	GF	GA	GD	Pts	Qualification or relegation
1	Rafinăria 4 Câmpina (Q)	22	18	3	1	108	24	+84	39	Qualification to championship play-off
2	Petrolul Teleajen Ploiești	22	12	5	5	46	41	+5	29	
3	Feroemail Ploiești	22	11	5	6	40	37	+3	27	
4	Carotajul Ploiești	22	9	7	6	46	35	+11	25	
5	Victoria Florești	22	10	4	8	37	22	+15	24	
6	Electrica Câmpina	22	8	7	7	45	38	+7	23	
7	Unirea Ploiești	22	9	4	9	35	45	−10	22	
8	Dinamo Câmpina	22	6	8	8	28	38	−10	20	
9	Petrolul Băicoi	22	6	6	10	34	45	−11	18	
10	Slănic	22	5	5	12	35	60	−25	15	
11	CFR Ploiești	22	5	1	16	23	58	−35	11	
12	Flamura Roșie Ploiești	22	4	3	15	19	54	−35	11	

Rules for classification: 1) points; 2) goal difference; 3) number of goals scored.
(Q) Qualified for the phase indicated

Series III

Pos	Team	Pld	W	D	L	GF	GA	GD	Pts	Qualification or relegation
1	Carpați Sinaia (Q)	20	13	6	1	45	12	+33	32	Qualification to championship play-off
2	Unitex Pucioasa	20	8	8	4	39	29	+10	24	
3	Petrolul Ochiuri	20	6	10	4	47	23	+24	22	
4	Victoria Moreni	20	8	5	7	32	36	−4	21	
5	Muncitorul Schela Mare	20	8	4	8	24	25	−1	20	
6	Metalul Mija	20	6	8	6	27	33	−6	20	
7	MIG Fieni	20	7	5	8	21	22	−1	19	
8	Minerul Șotânga	20	7	3	10	28	31	−3	17	
9	Cimentul Fieni	20	6	3	11	25	32	−7	15	
10	Unirea Azuga	20	6	3	11	22	34	−12	15	
11	Dinamo Caragiale	20	3	9	8	22	35	−13	15	

Rules for classification: 1) points; 2) goal difference; 3) number of goals scored.
(Q) Qualified for the phase indicated

Championship play-off

The championship play-off was played in a single round-robin tournament between the winners of each series. All matches were played at Petrolul Stadium in Ploiești.

Table

Pos	Team	Pld	W	D	L	GF	GA	GD	Pts	Qualification
1	Carpați Sinaia (C, Q)	2	1	1	0	3	2	+1	4	Qualification to promotion play-off
2	Rafinăria 4 Câmpina	2	1	0	1	4	2	+2	3	
3	Voința Râmnicu Sărat	2	0	1	1	1	4	−3	1	

Rules for classification: 1) Points; 2) Goal difference; 3) Number of goals scored.
(C) Champions; (Q) Qualified for the phase indicated

Results

11 June 1961	Carpați Sinaia	2–1	Rafinăria 4 Câmpina	Ploiești
				Stadium: Petrolul

15 June 1961	Rafinăria 4 Câmpina	3–0 (Note: The match was interrupted in the 75th minute at 2–0 and was homologated 3–0 in favor of team from Câmpina.)	Voința Râmnicu Sărat	Ploiești
				Stadium: Petrolul

18 June 1961	Carpați Sinaia	1–1	Voința Râmnicu Sărat	Ploiești
				Stadium: Petrolul

=== Suceava Region ===
Pos	Team	Pld	W	D	L	GF	GA	GD	Pts	Qualification
1	ASM Rădăuți (C, Q)	26	21	1	4	142	20	+122	43	Qualification to promotion play-off
2	Filatura Fălticeni	26	19	1	6	71	28	+43	39	
3	Unirea Botoșani	26	19	1	6	82	43	+39	39	
4	Energia Moldovița	26	17	4	5	56	38	+18	38	
5	ASA Câmpulung Moldovenesc	26	12	5	9	62	55	+7	29	
6	Minerul Vatra Dornei	26	12	2	12	70	58	+12	26	
7	Gloria Dorohoi	26	10	6	10	50	64	−14	26	
8	Avântul Frasin	26	11	3	12	52	74	−22	25	
9	Unirea Gura Humorului	26	9	3	14	35	55	−20	21	
10	CFR Suceava	26	7	6	13	41	56	−15	20	
11	Feroviarul Câmpulung Moldovenesc	26	7	4	15	27	59	−32	18	
12	Sănătatea Siret	26	6	5	15	30	58	−28	17	
13	Forestierul Falcău	26	7	2	17	49	82	−33	16	
14	Fulgerul Suceava	26	3	1	22	20	97	−77	7	

Rules for classification: 1) Points; 2) Goal difference; 3) Number of goals scored.
(C) Champions; (Q) Qualified for the phase indicated

== See also ==
- 1960–61 Divizia A
- 1960–61 Divizia B
- 1960–61 Cupa României
