= Petre Gavrilă =

Romanian association football manager

Personal information
- Place of birth: Romania

Managerial career
- Years: Team
- 1981–1983: Chimia Râmnicu Vâlcea
- 1983–1984: Progresul București
- 1986–1987: Chimia Râmnicu Vâlcea
- 1991–1995: Hearts of Oak
- 1995: Ghana
- 1995: Sportul Studențesc
- 1995–1996: Vanspor

Petre Gavrilă is a Romanian football manager who last worked as the head coach of defunct Turkish club Vanspor.

== Career ==
Gavrilă started his managerial career with Chimia Râmnicu Vâlcea. After that, he coached Accra Hearts of Oak S.C., the Ghana national football team, and Sportul Studențesc București. In 1995, he was appointed head coach of Vanspor in the Turkish Süper Lig, a position he held until 1996.
