= CSM Vulcan =

Romanian football club

- Full name: Clubul Sportiv Municipal "Mihai Viteazu" Vulcan
- Nicknames: Minerii (The Miners); Vulcănenii (The Vulcan People)
- Short name: CSM Vulcan
- Founded: 1921; 105 years ago as CS Vulcan; 2016; 10 years ago as CSM Mihai Viteazu Vulcan
- Ground: Central
- Capacity: 2,000
- Owner: Vulcan Municipality
- Chairman: Daniel Duna
- League: Liga IV
- 2025–26: Liga IV, Hunedoara, 10th of 11
Home colours	Away colours

Clubul Sportiv Municipal Mihai Viteazu Vulcan, commonly known as CSM Vulcan, or unofficially as Minerul Vulcan, is a Romanian football club based in Vulcan, Hunedoara County. Founded in 1921 as CS Vulcan and re-founded in 2016 as CSM Mihai Viteazu Vulcan, the club currently playing in the Liga IV – Hunedoara County.

== History ==
The club was established in 1921 and played for the first time in the 1922–23 season of the Arad Regional Championship, where it managed to occupied the 5th place.

In 1924, CS Vulcan merged with CAMP to form UCASP (Uniunea Cluburilor Sportive ale Societății Petroșani – Sports Club Association of Petroșani Society). From February 1926 the merger ceases, the team from Vulcan being renamed as Minerul. In 1927 another merger took place, this time the three teams from the Jiu Valley (CAMP, Jiul Lupeni and Minerul Vulcan) were consolidated under the name of Jiul Lupeni.

The merger was abandoned In 1929, and the team from Vulcan would continue under the name of Minerul, but only for a short period because the mines in the locality closed, and thus football was also abandoned. In 1939, the Vulcan team resumed its activity under the name of Antigaz, but only until 1944, when the Antigaz factory was closed. In 1955, with the reopening of the mine in the locality, the football team reappeared, and a stadium was built for them in the Coroești area.

The Miners occupied 12th place in the 1957–58 season and 7th in the following two seasons, 1958–59 and 1959–60, of the Hunedoara Regional Championship.

In the 1960–61 season, with Tudor Paraschiva as head coach, the Miners finished 1st in the Valea Jiului Series, losing the promotion play-off with Minerul Deva (1–1 and 0–3 on the green table after the team from Vulcan left the field dissatisfied with the refereeing), the winner of Valea Mureșului Series.

There followed fifteen consecutive seasons in the regional and county championship in which was ranked as follows: 4th (1961–62), 4th (1962–63), 7th (1963–64), 8th (1964–65), 9th (1965–66), 13th (1966–67), 10th (1967–68) in the Valea Jiului Series, 6th (1968–69), 4th (1969–70), 6th (1970–71), 2nd in the Valea Jiului Series (1971–72), 1st in the Valea Jiului Series of the 1972–73 season, losing the promotion play-off against Dacia Orăștie, the winner of Valea Mureșului Series (0–0 at home and 0–5 away), 9th (1973–74), 6th (1974–75) and 3rd (1975–76).

After many years in the regional or county championships, Minerul Vulcan promoted in Divizia C at the end of the 1976–77 season. With coach Gheorghe Kotormany on the bench and with players like Șarpe, Constantin, Viluț Oltean (goalkeepers), Polgar, Constantin Cătuți, Haiduc, Văduva, Achim, Croitoru, M. Pecsar, Dan Voicu, Justin Stoenescu, Ludovic Ferenczi, Octavian Popescu, Nemeș, Iacov, Zaharia Aruncuțeanu, Traian Moldovan among others, Minerul won Hunedoara County Championship and the promotion play-off against the winner of Arad County Championship, Libertatea Arad (1–2 away and 3–0 at home).

Minerul was struggled to survive to third division, finishing the next three seasons in fourteenth place (1977–78) one point ahead of second-bottom, eleventh (1978–79) avoiding relegation by two points and eighth (1979–80) at just one point above the relegation zone.

In the summer of 1980, Minerul Vulcan merged with Știinta Petroșani to form Minerul Știinta Vulcan.

== Honours ==
Liga IV – Hunedoara County

- Winners (4): 1976–77, 2000–01, 2001–02, 2011–12
- Runners-up (5): 1972–73, 1992–93, 1995–96, 1997–98, 2021–22

Hunedoara Regional Championship

- Runners-up (5): 1960–61
