= 1959–60 Regional Championship =

18th season of the Liga IV, the fourth tier of the Romanian football league

Liga IV
- Season: 1959–60

The 1959–60 Regional Championship was the 18th season of the Regional Championship, 7th as the third tier of Romanian football. The champions of each regional championships play against each other in the play-offs to gain promotion in Divizia B.

== Regional championships ==
- Baia Mare (BM)
- Bacău (BC)
- Bucharest Municipality (B)
- Bucharest Region (B)
- Cluj (CJ)
- Constanța (CT)
- Craiova (CR)
- Galați (GL)
- Hunedoara (HD)
- Iași (IS)
- Mureș (MS)
- Oradea (OR)
- Pitești (PI)
- Ploiești (PL)
- Stalin (ST)
- Suceava (SV)
- Timișoara (TM)

== Promotion play-off ==
Seventeen teams participate in the promotion tournament. The teams were divided into three groups of four and one of five, and the first two ranked teams from each group promoted to second division. The matches were played on neutral ground at Arad, Ploiești, Bacău and București.

=== Series I (Arad) ===
Table

Pos	Team	Pld	W	D	L	GF	GA	GD	Pts	Qualification
1	Voința Târgu Mureș (MS) (P)	3	2	0	1	3	2	+1	4	Promotion to Divizia B
2	Dinamo Săsar (BM) (P)	3	1	1	1	3	3	0	3	Promotion to Divizia B
3	Voința Oradea (OR)	3	1	1	1	5	5	0	3	Qualification to tie-breaker
4	Sticla Arieșul Turda (CJ)	3	1	0	2	4	5	−1	2	

Rules for classification: 1) points; 2) goal difference; 3) number of goals scored.
(P) Promoted

Results

10 July 1960	Dinamo Săsar	1–2	Sticla Arieșul Turda	Arad

10 July 1960	Voința Oradea	1–2	Voința Târgu Mureș	Arad

14 July 1960	Sticla Arieșul Turda	0–1	Voința Târgu Mureș	Arad

14 July 1960	Dinamo Săsar	1–1	Voința Oradea	Arad

17 July 1960	Dinamo Săsar	1–0	Voința Târgu Mureș	Arad

17 July 1960	Sticla Arieșul Turda	2–3	Voința Oradea	Arad

Promotion tie-breaker

Dinamo Săsar and Voința Oradea played a play-off match in order to determine the second promoted team to Divizia B from Series I. The tie-breaker match was played on 20 July 1960 in Arad.

Team 1	Score	Team 2
Dinamo Săsar	1–0	Voința Oradea

=== Series II (Ploiești) ===
Table

Pos	Team	Pld	W	D	L	GF	GA	GD	Pts	Qualification
1	Aurul Brad (HD) (P)	3	1	2	0	9	5	+4	4	Promotion to Divizia B
2	Chimia Govora (PI) (P)	3	2	0	1	4	5	−1	4	Promotion to Divizia B
3	Electroputere Craiova (CR)	3	1	1	1	4	3	+1	3	
4	Minerul Oravița (TM)	3	0	1	2	4	8	−4	1	

Rules for classification: 1) points; 2) goal difference; 3) number of goals scored.
(P) Promoted

Results

10 July 1960	Minerul Oravița	3–3	Aurul Brad	Ploiești

10 July 1960	Electroputere Craiova	0–1	Chimia Govora	Ploiești

14 July 1960	Minerul Oravița	1–3	Electroputere Craiova	Ploiești

14 July 1960	Aurul Brad	5–1	Chimia Govora	Ploiești

17 July 1960	Minerul Oravița	0–2	Chimia Govora	Ploiești

17 July 1960	Aurul Brad	1–1	Electroputere Craiova	Ploiești

=== Series III (Bacău) ===
Table

Pos	Team	Pld	W	D	L	GF	GA	GD	Pts	Qualification
1	Academia Militară București (B) (P)	4	3	0	1	15	3	+12	6	Promotion to Divizia B
2	CFR Roșiori (B) (P)	4	3	0	1	7	5	+2	6	Promotion to Divizia B
3	Rapid Plopeni (PL)	4	2	0	2	9	6	+3	4	
4	Chimica Târnăveni (ST)	4	2	0	2	8	12	−4	4	
5	Marina Constanța (CT)	4	0	0	4	5	18	−13	0	

Rules for classification: 1) points; 2) goal difference; 3) number of goals scored.
(P) Promoted

Results

10 July 1960	Rapid Plopeni	6–2	Marina Constanța	Bacău

10 July 1960	Chimica Târnăveni	0–6	Academia Militară București	Bacău

14 July 1960	Academia Militară București	3–2	CFR Roșiori	Bacău

14 July 1960	Chimica Târnăveni	5–3	Marina Constanța	Bacău

17 July 1960	Academia Militară București	6–0	Marina Constanța	Bacău

17 July 1960	CFR Roșiori	2–1	Rapid Plopeni	Bacău

21 July 1960	CFR Roșiori	2–1	Chimica Târnăveni	Bacău

21 July 1960	Academia Militară București	0–1	Rapid Plopeni	Bacău

24 July 1960	Rapid Plopeni	1–2	Chimica Târnăveni	Bacău

24 July 1960	Marina Constanța	0–1	CFR Roșiori	Bacău

=== Series IV (București) ===
Table

Pos	Team	Pld	W	D	L	GF	GA	GD	Pts	Qualification
1	CSM Brăila (GL) (P)	3	2	1	0	10	4	+6	5	Promotion to Divizia B
2	Steaua Roșie Bacău (BC) (P)	3	1	1	1	11	7	+4	3	Promotion to Divizia B
3	Penicilina Iași (IS)	3	1	0	2	9	11	−2	2	
4	Unirea Botoșani (SV)	3	1	0	2	7	15	−8	2	

Rules for classification: 1) points; 2) goal difference; 3) number of goals scored.
(P) Promoted

Results

10 July 1960	Penicilina Iași	3–4	Unirea Botoșani	București

10 July 1960	Steaua Roșie Bacău	1–1	CSM Brăila	București

14 July 1960	Unirea Botoșani	2–5	CSM Brăila	București

14 July 1960	Penicilina Iași	5–3	Steaua Roșie Bacău	București

17 July 1960	Penicilina Iași	1–4	CSM Brăila	București

17 July 1960	Unirea Botoșani	1–7	Steaua Roșie Bacău	București

== Championships standings ==
=== Baia Mare Region ===
Series I

Pos	Team	Pld	W	D	L	GF	GA	GD	Pts	Qualification or relegation
1	Dinamo Săsar (Q)	22	20	1	1	116	11	+105	41	Qualification to championship final
2	Unio Meteorul Roșu Satu Mare	22	16	5	1	89	13	+76	37	
3	Voința Satu Mare	22	11	4	7	46	41	+5	26	
4	Flamura Roșie Satu Mare	22	10	3	9	33	40	−7	23	
5	Voința Tășnad	22	9	6	7	32	37	−5	24	
6	Recolta Carei II	22	9	2	11	35	41	−6	20	
7	Unirea Seini	22	8	4	10	27	36	−9	20	
8	Baia Mare II	22	7	5	10	43	42	+1	19	
9	Lăpușul Târgu Lăpuș	22	7	5	10	29	51	−22	19	
10	Progresul Cehu Silvaniei	22	5	4	13	37	71	−34	14	
11	Stăruința Berveni	22	5	3	14	20	53	−33	13	
12	Ardudeana Ardud	22	2	4	16	19	90	−71	8	

Rules for classification: 1) points; 2) goal difference; 3) number of goals scored.
(Q) Qualified for the phase indicated

Series II

Pos	Team	Pld	W	D	L	GF	GA	GD	Pts	Qualification or relegation
1	Stăruința Sighetu Marmației (Q)	22	17	2	3	77	26	+51	36	Qualification to championship final
2	Minerul Baia Sprie	22	14	4	4	68	20	+48	32	
3	Constructorul Baia Mare	22	12	3	7	53	31	+22	27	
4	Dinamo Sighetu Marmației	22	12	3	7	48	34	+14	27	
5	Minerul Cavnic	22	9	5	8	32	25	+7	23	
6	Lumina Câmpulung la Tisa	22	9	5	8	31	33	−2	23	
7	Progresul Vișeu de Sus	22	7	6	9	29	27	+2	20	
8	Minerul Baia Borșa	22	8	4	10	35	49	−14	20	
9	Energia Negrești-Oaș	22	8	2	12	29	50	−21	18	
10	Minerul Băiuț	22	6	5	11	30	49	−19	17	
11	Topitorul Baia Mare	22	5	6	11	27	48	−21	16	
12	Viitorul Șomcuta Mare	22	2	1	19	9	76	−67	5	

Rules for classification: 1) points; 2) goal difference; 3) number of goals scored.
(Q) Qualified for the phase indicated

Championship final

Team 1	Agg.	Team 2	1st leg	2nd leg
Stăruința Sighetu Marmației	3–4	Dinamo Săsar	1–1	2–3

Dinamo Săsar won the Baia Mare Regional Championship and qualify for promotion play-off in Divizia C.

=== Bucharest Municipality ===
Championship final

Team 1	Agg.	Team 2	1st leg	2nd leg
Bumbacul București	4–7	Academia Militară București	1–1	3–6

Academia Militară București won the Bucharest Municipality Championship and qualify for promotion play-off in Divizia B.

=== Craiova Region ===
Series I

Pos	Team	Pld	W	D	L	GF	GA	GD	Pts	Qualification or relegation
1	Electroputere Craiova (Q)	24	17	3	4	85	30	+55	37	Qualification to championship final
2	Metalurgistul Sadu	24	17	3	4	55	20	+35	37	
3	Unirea Târgu Jiu (Note: Confecția Târgu Jiu and Flacăra Târgu Jiu merge during the winter break to form Unirea Târgu Jiu.)	24	15	3	6	57	31	+26	33	
4	CFR Turnu Severin	24	14	4	6	65	27	+38	32	
5	Progresul Strehaia	24	13	3	8	58	33	+25	29	
6	Metalul 7 Noiembrie Craiova	24	9	7	8	37	33	+4	25	
7	Morile Unite Jiul Craiova	24	8	6	10	39	56	−17	22	
8	Dinamo Turnu Severin	24	7	6	11	29	45	−16	20	
9	Progresul Filiași	24	7	5	12	34	61	−27	19	
10	Petrolul Țicleni	24	5	5	14	27	68	−41	15	
11	Cerna Baia de Aramă	24	6	3	15	29	55	−26	15	
12	Preajba Târgu Jiu	24	5	5	14	25	55	−30	15	
13	Autorapid Craiova	24	4	5	15	21	62	−41	13	
14	Confecția Târgu Jiu (D)	0	0	0	0	0	0	0	0	Disbanded

Rules for classification: 1) Points; 2) Goal difference; 3) Number of goals scored.
(D) Disqualified; (Q) Qualified for the phase indicated
Notes:

Series II

Pos	Team	Pld	W	D	L	GF	GA	GD	Pts	Qualification or relegation
1	Dinamo Craiova (Q)	26	21	3	2	92	17	+75	45	Qualification to championship final
2	Progresul Balș	26	17	3	6	60	22	+38	37	
3	Progresul Caracal	26	17	1	8	68	38	+30	35	
4	Dunărea Corabia	26	14	5	7	58	33	+25	33	
5	Dunărea Calafat	26	15	3	8	53	33	+20	33	
6	Progresul Segarcea	26	12	5	9	53	49	+4	29	
7	Voința Caracal	26	11	4	11	52	37	+15	26	
8	Progresul Băilești	26	9	7	10	60	49	+11	25	
9	Fulgerul Maglavit	26	11	3	12	45	48	−3	25	
10	Progresul Balș	26	7	7	12	36	51	−15	21	
11	Viitorul Cujmir	26	9	1	16	46	89	−43	19	
12	Tractorul Bechet	26	8	3	15	39	87	−48	19	
13	Recolta Urzicuța	26	7	3	16	36	87	−51	17	
14	CS Craiova II (Note: All matches of CS Craiova II were approved with 0–3.)	26	0	0	26	0	78	−78	0	

Rules for classification: 1) Points; 2) Goal difference; 3) Number of goals scored.
(Q) Qualified for the phase indicated
Notes:

Championship final

Team 1	Agg.	Team 2	1st leg	2nd leg
Electroputere Craiova	4–0	Dinamo Craiova	3–0	1–0

Electroputere Craiova won the Craiova Regional Championship and qualify for promotion play-off in Divizia C.

=== Galați Region ===
Series I

Pos	Team	Pld	W	D	L	GF	GA	GD	Pts	Qualification or relegation
1	Știința Galați (Q)	24	20	2	2	82	10	+72	42	Qualification to championship final
2	CSM Galați	24	19	3	2	69	17	+52	41	
3	Voința Focșani	24	17	3	4	73	27	+46	37	
4	Metalosport Galați	24	15	4	5	50	26	+24	34	
5	Gloria Tecuci	24	11	5	8	43	36	+7	27	
6	Voința Galați	24	12	1	11	60	38	+22	25	
7	Chimica Mărășești	24	8	6	10	40	33	+7	22	
8	Muncitorul Ghidigeni	24	9	4	11	47	41	+6	22	
9	Flamura Roșie Tecuci	24	9	4	11	45	59	−14	22	
10	Victoria Gugești	24	8	2	14	41	57	−16	18	
11	Viticultorul Panciu	24	8	0	16	35	75	−40	16	
12	Electrica Galați	24	3	0	21	15	109	−94	6	
13	Dinamo Galați II	24	0	0	24	0	72	−72	0	

Rules for classification: 1) points; 2) goal difference; 3) number of goals scored.
(Q) Qualified for the phase indicated

Series II

Pos	Team	Pld	W	D	L	GF	GA	GD	Pts	Qualification or relegation
1	CSM Brăila (Q)	22	20	2	0	105	15	+90	42	Qualification to championship final
2	UMP Brăila	22	17	4	1	74	19	+55	38	
3	Marina Brăila	22	14	5	3	52	10	+42	33	
4	Grivița Roșie Făurei	22	10	5	7	41	33	+8	25	
5	Dunărea Brăila	22	10	2	10	42	30	+12	22	
6	Recolta Însurăței	22	8	5	9	33	38	−5	21	
7	Victoria Brăila	22	10	1	11	35	53	−18	21	
8	Tractorul Nănești	22	9	0	13	35	64	−29	18	
9	Recolta Ianca	22	6	4	12	41	55	−14	16	
10	Tractorul Balta Albă	22	4	4	14	29	62	−33	12	
11	Tractorul Cioara-Doicești	22	3	4	15	29	70	−41	10	
12	Voința Măcin	22	2	2	18	15	82	−67	6	
13	Dinamo Tecuci (Note: Dinamo Tecuci was excluded in the first part of the season and all its results were canceled.) (D)	0	0	0	0	0	0	0	0	Excluded

Rules for classification: 1) points; 2) goal difference; 3) number of goals scored.
(D) Disqualified; (Q) Qualified for the phase indicated
Notes:

Championship final

Team 1	Agg.	Team 2	1st leg	2nd leg
Știința Galați	2–4	CSM Brăila	1–1	1–3

CSM Brăila won the Galați Regional Championship and qualify for promotion play-off in Divizia B.

=== Hunedoara Region ===
Series I

Pos	Team	Pld	W	D	L	GF	GA	GD	Pts	Qualification or relegation
1	Minerul Aninoasa (Q)	22	17	1	4	67	20	+47	35	Qualification to championship final
2	Parângul Lonea	22	14	3	5	49	22	+27	31	
3	Dacia Orăștie	22	14	1	7	54	29	+25	29	
4	Victoria Călan	22	12	5	5	49	31	+18	29	
5	CFR Simeria	22	12	4	6	47	28	+19	28	
6	Șantierul ICSH Hunedoara	22	11	4	7	33	35	−2	26	
7	Minerul Vulcan	22	11	3	8	52	30	+22	25	
8	Dinamo Orăștie (Note: Dinamo Orăștie was absorbed by Dacia Orăștie after 13 rounds and lost all remaining matches with 0–3.)	21	7	3	11	24	41	−17	17	
9	Minerul Petrila	22	4	5	13	26	54	−28	13	
10	Minerul Ghelari	22	3	6	13	21	56	−35	12	
11	Victoria Hațeg	22	3	6	13	14	38	−24	12	
12	Corvinul Hunedoara II (Note: Corvinul Hunedoara II was absorbed by Șantierul ICSH Hunedoara after 11 rounds and lost all remaining matches with 0–3.)	21	1	1	19	8	60	−52	3	

Rules for classification: 1) points; 2) goal difference; 3) number of goals scored.
(Q) Qualified for the phase indicated
Notes:

Series II

Pos	Team	Pld	W	D	L	GF	GA	GD	Pts	Qualification or relegation
1	Aurul Brad (Q)	26	21	3	2	113	16	+97	45	Qualification to championship final
2	Minerul Deva	26	19	4	3	89	11	+78	42	
3	Sebeșul Sebeș	26	17	3	6	58	28	+30	37	
4	UM Cugir	26	13	7	6	49	30	+19	33	
5	Unirea Alba Iulia	26	11	7	8	60	44	+16	29	
6	Aurul Zlatna	26	10	9	7	53	42	+11	29	
7	CFR Teiuș	26	11	6	9	40	47	−7	28	
8	Metalul Crișcior	26	10	8	8	46	56	−10	28	
9	Rapid Deva	26	9	7	10	50	56	−6	25	
10	Locomotiva Alba Iulia	26	8	4	14	48	63	−15	20	
11	Metalul Cugir (Note: Metalul Cugir was excluded after 16 rounds and lost all remaining matches with 0–3.)	26	7	6	13	21	42	−21	20	
12	Aurul Certej	26	6	3	17	27	66	−39	15	
13	Șurianul Petrești	26	4	3	19	18	90	−72	11	
14	Recolta Deva (Note: Recolta Deva was excluded after 13 rounds and lost all remaining matches with 0–3.)	26	1	0	25	7	87	−80	2	

Rules for classification: 1) points; 2) goal difference; 3) number of goals scored.
(Q) Qualified for the phase indicated
Notes:

Championship final

The matches were played on 19 and 26 June 1960.

Team 1	Agg.	Team 2	1st leg	2nd leg
Minerul Aninoasa	3–7	Aurul Brad	3–3	0–4

Aurul Brad won the Hunedoara Regional Championship and qualify for promotion play-off in Divizia B.

=== Mureș Region ===
Championship final

Team 1	Agg.	Team 2	1st leg	2nd leg
Voința Târgu Mureș	3–1	Textila Sfântu Gheorghe	2–0	1–1

Voința Târgu Mureș won the Mureș Regional Championship and qualify for promotion play-off in Divizia B.

=== Oradea Region ===
Pos	Team	Pld	W	D	L	GF	GA	GD	Pts	Qualification
1	Voința Oradea (C, Q)	30	24	5	1	87	20	+67	53	Qualification to promotion play-off
2	Rapid Oradea	30	17	10	3	71	29	+42	44	
3	Stăruința Salonta	30	19	5	6	55	20	+35	43	
4	ASA Oradea	30	15	9	6	63	31	+32	39	
5	Dinamo Dr. Petru Groza	30	11	11	8	48	42	+6	33	
6	Crișul Ineu	30	13	6	11	47	42	+5	32	
7	Stăruința Săcuieni	30	13	6	11	59	58	+1	32	
8	Spartac Valea lui Mihai	29	11	6	12	53	50	+3	28	
9	Dinamo Oradea	30	10	6	14	49	50	−1	26	
10	Victoria Chișineu-Criș	30	11	4	15	46	47	−1	26	
11	Crișana Sebiș	29	10	5	14	40	57	−17	25	
12	Înainte Oradea	30	10	3	17	42	61	−19	23	
13	Bihorul Beiuș	30	8	6	16	32	65	−33	22	
14	Victoria Marghita	29	8	4	17	36	78	−42	20	
15	Măgura Șimleu Silvaniei	30	6	3	21	32	63	−31	15	
16	Electrica Oradea	29	4	7	18	30	66	−36	15	

Rules for classification: 1) Points; 2) Goal difference; 3) Number of goals scored.
(C) Champions; (Q) Qualified for the phase indicated

=== Pitești Region ===
Pos	Team	Pld	W	D	L	GF	GA	GD	Pts	Qualification or relegation
1	Metalul Colibași (Q)	24	18	4	2	71	15	+56	40	Qualification to championship final
2	Avântul Curtea de Argeș	24	18	2	4	64	21	+43	38	
3	Textilistul Pitești	24	14	4	6	47	29	+18	32	
4	Progresul Topoloveni	24	14	2	8	55	42	+13	30	
5	Minerul Câmpulung	24	12	4	8	56	26	+30	28	
6	Progresul Pitești	24	11	5	8	34	31	+3	27	
7	Rapid Pitești	24	12	2	10	45	45	0	26	
8	Muscelul IMS Câmpulung	24	10	5	9	50	31	+19	25	
9	Progresul Găești	24	9	7	8	49	40	+9	25	
10	CSA Câmpulung	24	7	5	12	45	57	−12	19	
11	Unirea Costești	24	4	3	17	30	81	−51	11	
12	Voința Curtea de Argeș	24	2	2	20	20	90	−70	6	
13	Pompierul Pitești	24	2	1	21	10	68	−58	5	

Rules for classification: 1) points; 2) goal difference; 3) number of goals scored.
(Q) Qualified for the phase indicated

Pos	Team	Pld	W	D	L	GF	GA	GD	Pts	Qualification or relegation
1	Chimia Govora (Note: Șantierul Govora was renamed during the winter break as Chimia Govora.) (Q)	26	22	2	2	113	16	+97	46	Qualification to championship final
2	Victoria Slatina	26	15	5	6	66	34	+32	35	
3	Oltul Râmnicu Vâlcea	26	11	8	7	61	34	+27	30	
4	Lotru Brezoi	26	12	5	9	47	38	+9	29	
5	Unirea Potcoava	26	12	4	10	42	42	0	28	
6	Oltul Slatina	26	12	4	10	46	51	−5	28	
7	Rapid Piatra-Olt	26	12	3	11	56	49	+7	27	
8	Oltul Drăgănești-Olt	26	12	3	11	42	54	−12	27	
9	Unirea Drăgășani	26	9	8	9	39	30	+9	26	
10	Recolta Stoicănești	26	10	5	11	40	49	−9	25	
11	CSA Râmnicu Vâlcea	26	9	6	11	45	53	−8	24	
12	Dinamo Drăgășani	26	9	5	12	45	50	−5	23	
13	Avântul Horezu	26	5	4	17	28	76	−48	14	
14	Bistrița Băbeni	26	1	0	25	17	111	−94	2	

Rules for classification: 1) points; 2) goal difference; 3) number of goals scored.
(Q) Qualified for the phase indicated
Notes:

Championship final

Team 1	Agg.	Team 2	1st leg	2nd leg
Metalul Colibași	1–4	Chimia Govora	1–3	0–1

Chimia Govora won the Pitești Regional Championship and qualify for promotion play-off in Divizia B.

=== Ploiești Region ===
Championship final

Team 1	Agg.	Team 2	1st leg	2nd leg
Rapid Plopeni	5–2	Rafinăria Câmpina	3–0	2–2

Rapid Plopeni won the Ploiești Regional Championship and qualify for promotion play-off in Divizia B.

=== Stalin Region ===
Series I

Pos	Team	Pld	W	D	L	GF	GA	GD	Pts	Qualification or relegation
1	Torpedo Zărnești (Q)	26	20	4	2	57	14	+43	44	Qualification to championship final
2	Metrom Orașul Stalin	26	17	6	3	78	29	+49	40	
3	Rulmentul Orașul Stalin	26	14	5	7	52	25	+27	33	
4	Celuloza Zărnești	26	14	4	8	55	34	+21	32	
5	Dinamo Orașul Stalin	26	12	5	9	69	45	+24	29	
6	Flamura Roșie Lunca Călnicului	26	11	7	8	44	37	+7	29	
7	Sinteza Victoria	26	11	6	9	53	43	+10	28	
8	Măgura Codlea	26	13	2	11	40	40	0	28	
9	Precizia Săcele	26	12	3	11	47	38	+9	27	
10	Politehnica Orașul Stalin	26	7	6	13	41	45	−4	20	
11	Fructexport Codlea	26	6	7	13	29	54	−25	19	
12	Textila Cisnădie	26	4	7	15	29	66	−37	15	
13	Progresul Beclean	26	5	2	19	25	72	−47	12	
14	Cetatea Rupea	26	2	2	22	24	107	−83	6	

Rules for classification: 1) points; 2) goal difference; 3) goals scored
(Q) Qualified for the phase indicated

Series II

Pos	Team	Pld	W	D	L	GF	GA	GD	Pts	Qualification or relegation
1	Chimica Târnăveni (Q)	26	22	2	2	81	24	+57	46	Qualification to championship final
2	CSM Sibiu	26	20	1	5	121	32	+89	41	
3	Vitrometan Mediaș	26	13	6	7	45	27	+18	32	
4	Textila Mediaș	26	14	4	8	51	37	+14	32	
5	CSF Sighișoara	26	15	1	10	63	47	+16	31	
6	CFR Sibiu	26	13	5	8	50	48	+2	31	
7	Voința Târnăveni	26	12	6	8	41	32	+9	30	
8	ASA Sibiu II	26	11	2	13	53	54	−1	24	
9	Victoria Copșa Mică	26	9	6	11	37	41	−4	24	
10	Record Mediaș	26	8	7	11	38	39	−1	23	
11	Sparta Mediaș	26	8	1	17	35	49	−14	17	
12	Voința Blaj	26	5	5	16	30	96	−66	15	
13	Sticla Târnăveni	26	5	2	19	25	72	−47	12	
14	Progresul Agnita	26	1	4	21	23	95	−72	6	

Rules for classification: 1) points; 2) goal difference; 3) goals scored
(Q) Qualified for the phase indicated

Championship final

Team 1	Agg.	Team 2	1st leg	2nd leg	3rd leg	4th leg
Chimica Târnăveni	4–4	Torpedo Zărnești	2–1	0–1	1–1 (Note: The match was played on neutral ground.)	1–1 (Note: The match was played on neutral ground in Sighișoara. Chimica Târnăveni won due to the younger average age.)

Chimica Târnăveni won the Stalin Regional Championship and qualify for promotion play-off in Divizia C.

=== Suceava Region ===
Pos	Team	Pld	W	D	L	GF	GA	GD	Pts	Qualification
1	Unirea Botoșani (Note: Dinamo Botoșani and Textila Botoșani merge during the winter break to form Unirea Botoșani.) (C, Q)	26	22	3	1	119	17	+102	47	Qualification to promotion play-off
2	Filatura Fălticeni	26	23	1	2	85	22	+63	47	
3	Minerul Vatra Dornei	26	15	6	5	92	27	+65	36	
4	Dinamo Câmpulung Moldovenesc	26	15	2	9	90	44	+46	32	
5	Energia Moldovița	26	13	4	9	63	48	+15	30	
6	Gloria Dorohoi	26	13	4	9	52	47	+5	30	
7	Unirea Gura Humorului	26	13	1	12	47	60	−13	27	
8	Steagul Roșu CFR Suceava	26	9	3	14	45	75	−30	21	
9	Metalul Rădăuți	26	10	1	15	41	81	−40	21	
10	Siretul Siret (Note: Siretul Siret began the season as IRA 10 Siret, changing its name during the winter break.)	26	7	5	14	40	62	−22	19	
11	Fulgerul Suceava	26	8	1	17	39	73	−34	17	
12	Textila Botoșani (D)	26	6	2	18	42	66	−24	14	Disbanded
13	Avântul Frasin	26	6	2	18	43	93	−50	14	
14	Constructorul Vatra Dornei (Note: Constructorul Vatra Dornei withdrew during the season and lost all remaining matches with 0–3.) (D)	26	1	1	24	11	64	−53	3	Disbanded

Rules for classification: 1) Points; 2) Goal difference; 3) Number of goals scored.
(C) Champions; (D) Disqualified; (Q) Qualified for the phase indicated

=== Timișoara Region ===
Championship final

Team 1	Agg.	Team 2	1st leg	2nd leg
Ceramica Jimbolia	1–4	Minerul Oravița	1–1	0–3

Minerul Oravița won the Timișoara Regional Championship and qualify for promotion play-off in Divizia B.

== See also ==
- 1959–60 Divizia A
- 1959–60 Divizia B
- 1959–60 Cupa României
