= 1965–66 Știința Craiova season =

Știința Craiova
1965–66 season
- Stadium: Tineretului
- Divizia A: 8th
- Cupa României: Round of 32
- Biggest win: Știința Craiova 2–0 UTA Arad; Știința Craiova 3–1 CSMS Iași; Știința Craiova 3–1 Siderurgistul Galați
- Biggest defeat: Dinamo București 8–0 Știința Craiova
Home colours

The 1965–66 Știința Craiova season is the 18th season in the club's history, and the 2nd consecutive in Divizia A, the top league of Romanian football.

== Competitions ==
Win Draw Loss

=== Overview ===
Competition	First match	Last match	Starting round	Final position	Record							
Competition	First match	Last match	Starting round	Final position	Pld	W	D	L	GF	GA	GD	Win %
Divizia A	15 August 1965	26 June 1965	Matchday 1	8th	26	9	7	10	23	38	−15	34.62
Cupa României	13 March 1966	13 March 1966	Round of 32	Round of 32	1	0	0	1	1	3	−2	0.00
Total					27	9	7	11	24	41	−17	33.33

Last updated: 11 June 2018
Source: Competitions

=== Divizia A ===
==== League table ====
Pos	Team	Pld	W	D	L	GF	GA	GD	Pts	Qualification or relegation
6	CSMS Iași	26	11	5	10	33	37	−4	27	
7	Știința Cluj	26	8	10	8	34	35	−1	26	
8	Știința Craiova	26	9	7	10	23	38	−15	25	
9	Farul Constanța	26	10	4	12	32	37	−5	24	Invitation to Balkans Cup
10	UTA Arad	26	8	8	10	33	40	−7	24	Invitation to Balkans Cup

Source: LT
Rules for classification: 1) points; 2) goal difference; 3) number of goals scored

==== Results summary ====
Overall								Home						Away					
Pld	W	D	L	GF	GA	GD	Pts	W	D	L	GF	GA	GD	W	D	L	GF	GA	GD
26	9	7	10	23	38	−15	34	9	4	0	17	5	+12	0	3	10	6	33	−27

Last updated: 22 March 2018.
Source: Divizia A

==== Positions by round ====
Round	1	2	3	4	5	6	7	8	9	10	11	12	13	14	15	16	17	18	19	20	21	22	23	24	25	26
Ground	A	H	A	H	H	A	H	A	H	H	A	H	A	H	A	H	A	H	A	H	A	H	A	A	A	H
Result	L	D	L	W	W	L	D	L	D	W	D	W	L	W	L	W	L	D	D	W	D	W	L	L	L	W
Position	13	11	12	10	13	10	12	11	13	13	11	11	8	6	10	7	10	9	8	8	7	4	6	8	7	8

Source: Divizia A
A = Away; H = Home; W = Win; D = Draw; L = Loss

==== Matches ====
Win Draw Loss

15 August 1965 1	Rapid București	2-0	Știința Craiova	Bucharest, Romania
				Stadium: Giulești-Valentin Stănescu

22 August 1965 2	Știința Craiova	1-1	Știința Cluj	Craiova, Romania
				Stadium: Tineretului

29 August 1965 3	Știința Timișoara	3-0	Știința Craiova	Timișoara, Romania
				Stadium: 1 Mai

5 September 1965 4	Știința Craiova	2-1	Farul Constanța	Craiova, Romania
				Stadium: Tineretului

26 September 1965 6	Știința Craiova	2-0	UTA Arad	Craiova, Romania
				Stadium: Tineretului

3 October 1965 7	Dinamo Pitești	3-1	Știința Craiova	Pitești, Romania
				Stadium: 1 Mai

10 October 1965 8	Știința Craiova	0-0	Steagul Roșu Brașov	Craiova, Romania
				Stadium: Tineretului

13 October 1965 9	Crișul Oradea	1-0	Știința Craiova	Oradea, Romania
				Stadium: Municipal

31 October 1965 10	Știința Craiova	0-0	Dinamo București	Craiova, Romania
				Stadium: Tineretului

7 November 1965 11	Știința Craiova	3-1	CSMS Iași	Craiova, Romania
				Stadium: Tineretului

10 November 1965 12	Steaua București	0–0	Știința Craiova	Bucharest, Romania
				Stadium: Republicii

28 November 1965 13	Știința Craiova	3-1	Siderurgistul Galați	Craiova, Romania
				Stadium: Tineretului

8 December 1965 5	Petrolul Ploiești	5-2	Știința Craiova	Ploiești, Romania
				Stadium: Ilie Oană

20 March 1966 14	Știința Craiova	1-0	Rapid București	Craiova, Romania
				Stadium: Tineretului

27 March 1966 15	Universitatea Cluj	1-0	Știința Craiova	Cluj-Napoca, Romania
				Stadium: Ion Moina

31 March 1966 16	Știința Craiova	1-0	Politehnica Timișoara	Craiova, Romania
				Stadium: Tineretului

10 April 1966 17	Farul Constanța	4-0	Știința Craiova	Constanța, Romania
				Stadium: Farul

17 April 1966 18	Știința Craiova	0-0	Petrolul Ploiești	Craiova, Romania
				Stadium: Tineretului

2 May 1966 19	UTA Arad	1-1	Știința Craiova	Arad, Romania
				Stadium: Francisc Von Neuman

8 May 1966 20	Știința Craiova	1-0	Dinamo Pitești	Craiova, Romania
				Stadium: Tineretului

15 May 1966 21	Steagul Roșu Brașov	1-1	Știința Craiova	Brașov, Romania
				Stadium: Tineretului

22 May 1966 22	Știința Craiova	1-0	Crișul Oradea	Craiova, Romania
				Stadium: Tineretului

5 June 1966 23	Dinamo București	8-0	Știința Craiova	Bucharest, Romania
				Stadium: Dinamo

10 June 1966 26	Siderurgistul Galați	3-1	Știința Craiova	Galați, Romania
				Stadium: Siderurgistul

12 June 1966 24	CSMS Iași	1-0	Știința Craiova	Iași, Romania
				Stadium: 23 August

26 June 1966 25	Știința Craiova	2–1	Steaua București	Craiova, Romania
				Stadium: Tineretului

=== Cupa României ===
AS Aiud (Div. C) 3–1 (Div. A) Știința Craiova

13 March 1966 Round of 32	AS Aiud (Div. C)	3–1	Știința Craiova	Aiud, Romania

== See also ==
- 1965–66 Divizia A
- 1965–66 Cupa României
