= 1960–61 Divizia B =

21st season of the Liga II

Divizia B
- Season: 1960–61
- Promoted: Metalul Târgoviște; Dinamo Pitești; Jiul Petroșani
- Relegated: Unirea Iași; CFR Electroputere Craiova; Gloria Bistrița; Rulmentul Bârlad; Drobeta Turnu-Severin; Dinamo Barza

The 1960–61 Divizia B was the 21st season of the second tier of the Romanian football league system.

The format has been maintained to three series, each of them having 14 teams. At the end of the season the winners of the series promoted to Divizia A and the last two places from each series relegated to Regional Championship.

== Team changes ==
=== To Divizia B ===
Relegated from Divizia A

- Jiul Petroșani

Promoted from Regional Championship

- Academia Militară București
- CFR Roșiori
- Chimia Govora
- Dinamo Săsar
- Aurul Brad
- CSM Brăila
- Steaua Roșie Bacău
- Voința Târgu Mureș

=== From Divizia B ===
Promoted to Divizia A

- CSMS Iași
- Știința Timișoara
- Corvinul Hunedoara

Relegated to Regional Championship

- Victoria Buzău
- Metalul Oțelu Roșu
- CFR Arad
- Sportul Muncitoresc Radăuți
- Carpați Sinaia
- CS Târgu Mureș

=== Other changes ===
- Gaz Metan Mediaș was renamed CSM Mediaș.
- Metalul Titanii București was renamed Metalul București.
- Tractorul Orașul Stalin was renamed Tractorul Brașov.
- Unirea Focșani was renamed Rapid Focșani.
- Aurul Brad was renamed during the winter break Dinamo Barza.
- ASA Sibiu ceded its place to newly formed CSM Sibiu.
- CS Craiova and Electroputere Craiova merged, the first one being absorbed by the second one. After the merge Electroputere changed its name in CFR Electroputere Craiova.
- CS Târgu Mureș and Voința Târgu Mureș merged, the first one being absorbed by the second one. After the merge Voința changed its name in Mureșul Târgu Mureș.
- CFR Cluj and Rapid Cluj merged, the first one being absorbed by the second one. The new club was named CSM Cluj.
- Arieșul Turda took the place of CFR Cluj due to the merge between CFR Cluj and Rapid Cluj.

== League tables ==
=== Series I ===
Pos	Team	Pld	W	D	L	GF	GA	GD	Pts	Promotion or relegation
1	Metalul Târgoviște (C, P)	26	18	5	3	68	21	+47	41	Promotion to Divizia A
2	Dinamo Galați	26	15	6	5	48	23	+25	36	
3	Flacăra Moreni	26	12	6	8	44	39	+5	30	
4	Poiana Câmpina	26	11	7	8	35	28	+7	29	
5	CFR Pașcani	26	10	7	9	37	38	−1	27	
6	Dinamo Suceava	26	10	7	9	36	38	−2	27	
7	Brăila	26	7	11	8	29	33	−4	25	
8	SNM Constanța	26	7	10	9	33	31	+2	24	
9	Foresta Fălticeni	26	9	6	11	33	43	−10	24	
10	Rapid Focșani	26	9	5	12	37	42	−5	23	
11	Prahova Ploiești	26	9	4	13	44	45	−1	22	
12	Steaua Roșie Bacău	26	6	9	11	23	46	−23	21	
13	Unirea Iași (R)	26	6	5	15	39	55	−16	17	Relegation to Regional Championship
14	Rulmentul Bârlad (R)	26	5	6	15	28	58	−30	16	Relegation to Regional Championship

Source: romaniansoccer.ro
Rules for classification: 1) Points 2) Head-to-head points; 3) Head-to-head goal difference; 4) Head-to-head goals scored; 5) Head-to-head away goals scored; 6) Goal difference; 7) Goals scored.
(C) Champions; (P) Promoted; (R) Relegated

=== Series II ===
Pos	Team	Pld	W	D	L	GF	GA	GD	Pts	Promotion or relegation
1	Dinamo Pitești (C, P)	26	17	4	5	60	24	+36	38	Promotion to Divizia A
2	Știința Craiova	26	12	5	9	42	22	+20	29	
3	Știința București	26	12	5	9	43	34	+9	29	
4	CSM Sibiu	26	12	4	10	44	37	+7	28	
5	Tractorul Brașov	26	10	7	9	37	28	+9	27	
6	Dinamo Obor București	26	9	9	8	37	29	+8	27	
7	CSM Mediaș	26	10	6	10	36	43	−7	26	
8	CFR Roșiori	26	10	6	10	19	25	−6	26	
9	Academia Militară București	26	9	7	10	38	37	+1	25	
10	Metalul București	26	10	5	11	33	42	−9	25	
11	Chimia Govora	26	8	7	11	25	41	−16	23	
12	Chimia Făgăraș	26	9	4	13	33	44	−11	22	
13	CFR Electroputere Craiova (R)	26	8	5	13	33	49	−16	21	Relegation to Regional Championship
14	Drobeta-Turnu Severin (R)	26	6	6	14	34	59	−25	18	Relegation to Regional Championship

Source: romaniansoccer.ro
Rules for classification: 1) Points 2) Head-to-head points; 3) Head-to-head goal difference; 4) Head-to-head goals scored; 5) Head-to-head away goals scored; 6) Goal difference; 7) Goals scored.
(C) Champions; (P) Promoted; (R) Relegated

=== Series III ===
Pos	Team	Pld	W	D	L	GF	GA	GD	Pts	Promotion or relegation
1	Jiul Petroșani (C, P)	26	14	6	6	39	21	+18	34	Promotion to Divizia A
2	Baia Mare	26	14	6	6	37	22	+15	34	
3	IS Câmpia Turzii	26	14	5	7	53	29	+24	33	
4	CFR Timișoara	26	15	2	9	50	27	+23	32	
5	CS Oradea	26	14	2	10	49	38	+11	30	
6	Arieșul Turda	26	10	8	8	36	34	+2	28	
7	Mureșul Târgu Mureș	26	10	7	9	39	33	+6	27	
8	CSM Cluj	26	9	7	10	29	41	−12	25	
9	Recolta Carei	26	8	8	10	24	36	−12	24	
10	Dinamo Săsar	26	10	3	13	35	36	−1	23	
11	CSM Reșița	26	8	7	11	27	39	−12	23	
12	AMEFA Arad	26	6	9	11	29	32	−3	21	
13	Gloria Bistrița (R)	26	6	6	14	24	47	−23	18	Relegation to Regional Championship
14	Dinamo Barza (R)	26	4	4	18	26	62	−36	12	Relegation to Regional Championship

Source: romaniansoccer.ro
Rules for classification: 1) Points 2) Head-to-head points; 3) Head-to-head goal difference; 4) Head-to-head goals scored; 5) Head-to-head away goals scored; 6) Goal difference; 7) Goals scored.
(C) Champions; (P) Promoted; (R) Relegated

== See also ==
- 1960–61 Divizia A
- 1960–61 Regional Championship
- 1960–61 Cupa României
