= Stadionul Central (Vulcan) =

Stadium in Romania

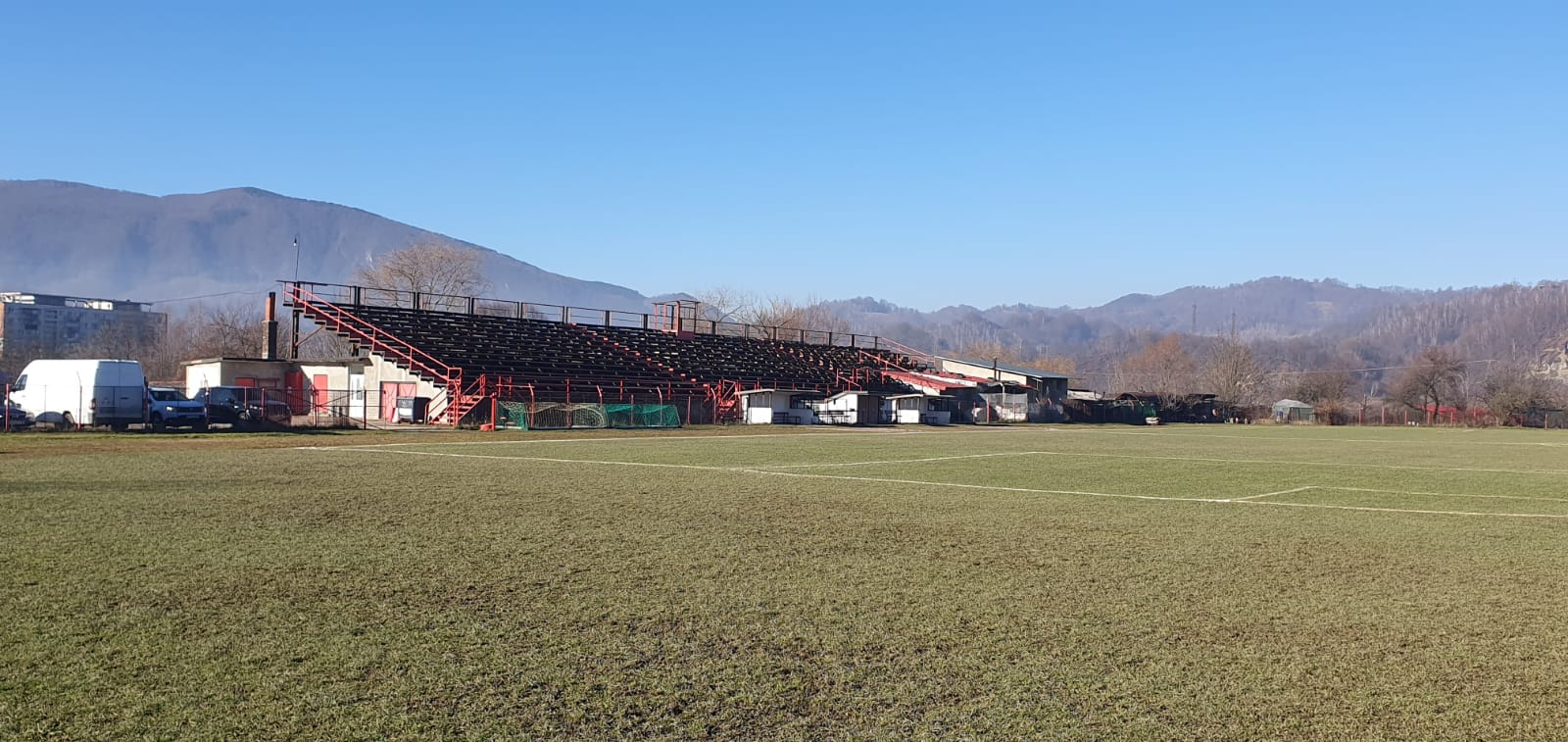
- Interactive map of Stadionul Central
- Address: Strada Coroiești, Vulcan 336200
- Location: Vulcan, Romania
- Coordinates: 45°22′36.8″N 23°18′23.6″E
- Owner: Municipality of Vulcan
- Operator: CSM Vulcan
- Capacity: 2,000
- Surface: Grass

Construction
- Opened: 1955

Tenant
- CSM Vulcan (1955–present)

Central Stadium is a multi-use stadium in Vulcan, Hunedoara County. It is the home ground of CSM Vulcan. It can hold 2,000 people.
