= Chimia Râmnicu Vâlcea =

Romanian football club (1946–2004)

CS Chimia Râmnicu Vâlcea
- Full name: Clubul Sportiv Chimia Râmnicu Vâlcea
- Short name: Chimia Râmnicu Vâlcea
- Founded: 1946
- Dissolved: 2004
- Ground: Municipal
- Capacity: 10,000

Chimia Râmnicu Vâlcea was a football club based in Râmnicu Vâlcea, Vâlcea County, Romania. It was founded in 1946 and dissolved in 2004. It won one Romanian Cup, in 1973.

== History ==
Period	Name
1946–1947	Vâlceana Râmnicu Vâlcea
1947–1956	CSM Râmnicu Vâlcea
1956–1957	Flamura Roșie Râmnicu Vâlcea
1957–1958	Unirea Râmnicu Vâlcea
1958–1960	Șantierul Govora
1960–1962	Chimia Govora
1962–1965	Unirea Râmnicu Vâlcea
1965–1967	Oltul Râmnicu Vâlcea
1967–1994	Chimia Râmnicu Vâlcea
1994–2004	FC Râmnicu Vâlcea

In 1946 Vâlceana appeared in the Third Division. In 1947 it changed its name to CSM Vâlcea. The club is relegated and only in 1956 does it succeed in returning again under the name of Flamura Roşie, the name being changed the next year to Unirea and in 1958 to Şantierul Govora. It is relegated again, but after one year, the team jumped directly to the Second Division under the name of Chimia Govora.

In 1962 the club changed its name again, this time to Unirea Râmnicu Vâlcea, in 1966 to Oltul and in 1967 to Chimia Râmnicu Vâlcea. Since 1960 the squad has participated at 10 editions of Liga II, finishing in the top half. One season in Liga III followed, but the team managed to be promoted to the Liga II again.

Its greatest performance came at the end of the 1972–1973 season, when the team won the Romanian Cup as a Divizia B team after a double match in "The final of the poor" against Divizia C team Constructorul Galați, (1–1, 3–0). The team was coached by Dumitru Anescu: Stana – Burlacu, T. Ciobanu, Pintilie, Petrică – I. Haidu, I. Ionescu – Şutru (Orovitz), Donose, Gojgaru (H. Popescu), V. Iordache (Tifirel).

The following season, under chairman N. Dinescu and coaches Gh. Nuţescu and D. Anescu, the club gained promotion to the First Division. Players during this period included Ion Crăciunescu, Lepădatu, Enache, Borz, Cincă, C. Nicolae, Păunescu, Emil Dumitriu and Pavel Peniu.

In autumn 1973, the club competed in the first round of the European Cup Winners' Cup, where it was eliminated by Glentoran. After two seasons in the First Division, the club was relegated to the Second Division, returning three years later under coach Marcel Pigulea.

The club subsequently spent nine consecutive seasons in Romania's top division, during which Teodor Coman, a member of the Romanian Communist Party, was involved in its administration. Players during this period included Gh. Constantin, V. Roşca, N. Pavel, Başno, Iordan, Cincă, Lepădatu, Catargiu, Florin Cheran, Fl. Udrea, Niță Cireașă, Carabageac, Savu, Gabriel Stan, Mih. Alexandru, Vergu, C. Iovan, Ad. Coca, Gîngiu, Stanca, Teleşpan, M. Preda, Buduru and Verigeanu.

In 1987, the club is relegated to the Second Division, and after 10 years, in 1996 to the Third Division. In 1994, it changes its name to FC Râmnicu Vâlcea. In 1998 a new relegation comes, this time to the County Championship (Fourth League).

In 2004 the club is dissolved after serious financial problems.

== Honours ==
Liga II:

- Winners (2): 1973–74, 1977–78
- Runners-up (2): 1988–89, 1990–91

Liga III:

- Winners (1): 1970–71
- Runners-up (2): 1956, 1957–58

Cupa României:

- Winners (1): 1972–73

== Chimia Râmnicu Vâlcea in Europe ==
European Cup Winners' Cup

Season	Round	Club	Home	Away	Aggregate
1973–74	First round	(Northern Ireland) Glentoran	2–2	0–2	2–4

== Chimia Râmnicu Vâlcea in Divizia A ==
Seasons	Pld	W	D	L	GF	GA	Pts	Pos	Comments	Coaching History
1974–75	34	11	9	14	35	54	31	17	Relegated to Divizia B	Alexandru Constantinescu – (1–7) / Dumitru Anescu – (8–17; 33–34) / Victor Stănculescu – (18–32)
1978–79	34	13	5	16	38	54	31	15		Marcel Pigulea
1979–80	34	14	6	14	42	49	34	9		Marcel Pigulea
1980–81	34	15	4	15	51	60	34	9		Marcel Pigulea
1981–82	34	12	9	13	37	48	33	8		Tănase Dima – (1–6) / Petre Gavrilă – (7–34)
1982–83	34	12	7	15	33	43	31	15		Petre Gavrilă – (1–5) / Ion Oblemenco – (6–34)
1983–84	34	14	6	14	40	50	34	9		Ion Oblemenco
1984–85	34	11	7	16	26	50	29	14		Ion Oblemenco – (1–17) / Lucian Cataragiu – (18–34)
1985–86	34	12	5	17	36	53	29	14		Marcel Pigulea
1986–87	34	7	6	21	30	72	20	18	Relegated to Divizia B	Marian Bașno – (1–9) / Nicolae Dinescu – (10–17) / Petre Gavrilă – (18–34)

== League history ==
Season	Tier	Division	Place	Notes	Cupa României
1997–98	3	Divizia C (III)	19th	Dissolved	
1996–97	3	Divizia C (III)	16th		
1995–96	2	Divizia B (II)	18th	Relegated	
1994–95	2	Divizia B (I)	14th		
1993–94	2	Divizia B (I)	10th		
1992–93	2	Divizia B (I)	13th		
1991–92	2	Divizia B (II)	6th		
1990–91	2	Divizia B (II)	2nd		
1989–90	2	Divizia B (II)	4th		
1988–89	2	Divizia B (II)	2nd		
1987–88	2	Divizia B (II)	8th		
1986–87	1	Divizia A	18th	Relegated	Round of 32
1985–86	1	Divizia A	14th		Quarter-finals
1984–85	1	Divizia A	14th		Quarter-finals
1983–84	1	Divizia A	9th		Round of 16
1982–83	1	Divizia A	15th		Round of 16
1981–82	1	Divizia A	8th		Quarter-finals
1980–81	1	Divizia A	9th		Quarter-finals
1979–80	1	Divizia A	9th		Round of 16
1978–79	1	Divizia A	15th		Round of 32
1977–78	2	Divizia B (II)	1st (C)	Promoted	Round of 32
1976–77	2	Divizia B (II)	3rd		

Season	Tier	Division	Place	Notes	Cupa României
1975–76	2	Divizia B (II)	10th		
1974–75	1	Divizia A	17th	Relegated	Round of 32
1973–74	2	Divizia B (II)	1st (C)	Promoted	Semi-finals
1972–73	2	Divizia B (I)	10th		Winner
1971–72	2	Divizia B (I)	13th		
1970–71	3	Divizia C (IV)	1st (C)	Promoted	
1969–70	2	Divizia B (II)	15th	Relegated	Round of 32
1968–69	2	Divizia B (II)	14th		Round of 32
1967–68	2	Divizia B (I)	13th	Play-offs winner	
1966–67	2	Divizia B (I)	12th		
1965–66	2	Divizia B (I)	10th		
1964–65	2	Divizia B (I)	11th		
1963–64	2	Divizia B (I)	10th		
1962–63	2	Divizia B (II)	6th		
1961–62	2	Divizia B (II)	9th		Round of 16
1960–61	2	Divizia B (II)	11th		
1959–60	3	Regional (PI)	1st (C)	Promoted	
1958–59	3	Divizia C (VI)	4th		
1957–58	3	Divizia C (III)	2nd		
1956	3	Divizia C (IV)	2nd		
1948–49	3	Divizia C (IV)	5th		
1947–48	3	Divizia C (IX)	4th		

== Former managers ==
- (Romania) Gheorghe Bărbulescu (1962–1963)
- (Romania) Constantin Popescu (1963–1965)
- (Romania) Gheorghe Nuțescu (1968–1969)
- (Romania) Gheorghe Bărbulescu (1971–1972)
- (Romania) Gheorghe Nuțescu (1973–1974)
- (Romania) Victor Stănculescu (1975)
- (Romania) Marcel Pigulea (1976–1981)
- (Romania) Ion Oblemenco (1982–1985)
- (Romania) Petre Gavrilă (1981–1983)
- (Romania) Marcel Pigulea (1985–1986)
- (Romania) Petre Gavrilă (1986–1987)
- (Romania) Alexandru Moldovan (1987–1989)
- (Romania) Ion Oblemenco (1990–1991)
- (Romania) Nicolae Zamfir (1995–1996)
