= Ion Oblemenco =

Romanian footballer (1945–1996)

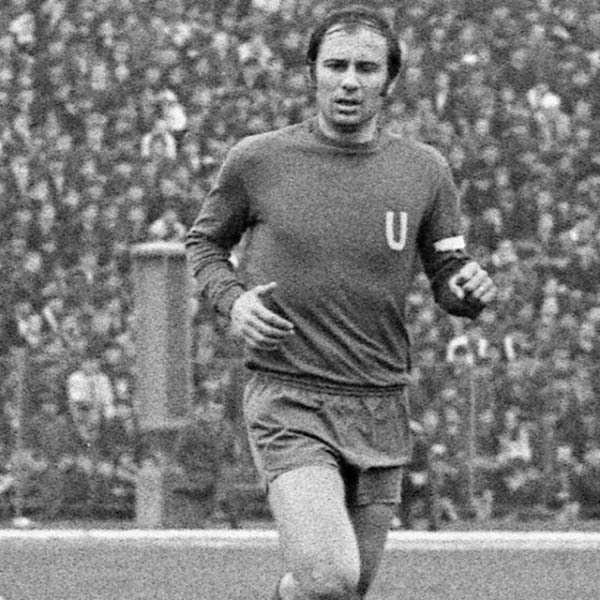
- Oblemenco with Universitatea Craiova

Personal information
- Date of birth: 13 May 1945
- Place of birth: Corabia, Romania
- Date of death: 1 September 1996 (aged 51)
- Place of death: Agadir, Morocco
- Height: 1.82 m (6 ft 0 in)
- Position: Striker

Youth career
- 1958–1959: Progresul Corabia
- 1959–1960: CFR Electroputere Craiova
- 1960–1962: Universitatea Craiova

Senior career*
Years	Team	Apps	(Gls)
1962	CSO Craiova		
1962–1963	Tractorul Corabia		
1963–1966	Rapid București	8	(3)
1966–1977	Universitatea Craiova	264	(167)
1977–1978	FCM Galați	31	(23)
Total		303	(193)

International career
1966–1968	Romania U23	11	(4)
1966	Romania B	1	(1)

Managerial career
- 1979–1980: Universitatea Craiova (assistant)
- 1980–1982: Universitatea Craiova
- 1982–1985: Chimia Râmnicu Vâlcea
- 1985: Olt Scornicești
- 1986: Sportul Muncitoresc Slatina
- 1987: Pandurii Târgu Jiu
- 1987: Sportul Muncitoresc Slatina
- 1987–1988: Olt Scornicești (assistant)
- 1989: Progresul Corabia
- 1990–1991: Chimia Râmnicu Vâlcea
- 1992: Constructorul-Universitatea Craiova
- 1992–1993: Universitatea Craiova
- 1995: ARO Muscelul Câmpulung
- 1996: Hassania Agadir
- * Club domestic league appearances and goals

Ion Oblemenco (13 May 1945 – 1 September 1996) was a Romanian football player and manager who spent the majority of his playing career with Universitatea Craiova. A prolific striker, he is known for finishing four seasons as top goalscorer in the Romanian top division, Divizia A. With a total of 170 goals in 272 appearances, he is the sixth highest-scoring player in the history of the competition. However, these performances were not enough to earn him a cap for the national team.

== Club career ==
"I kissed Oblemenco more than my wife because of how many goals he scored!"

— Petre Deselnicu, former teammate of Ion Oblemenco at "U" Craiova

Oblemenco, nicknamed "Tunarul" (The Cannon) because of his goalscoring ability, was born in Corabia, Olt County, Romania and began his youth career in 1958 at the age of 13 with local club Progresul. His first coach was Petre Prodileanu. In 1959 he moved to CFR Electroputere Craiova, which merged with Știința Craiova to create CSO Craiova, where he ended his youth period.

He played his first senior match on 6 May 1962 under coach Valeriu Călinoiu, appearing for CSO Craiova in a Divizia B match which ended in a 0–0 draw against CSM Mediaș. In the 1962–63 season he played for Tractorul Corabia and was the team's top-scorer, helping them gain promotion to Divizia C. At age 19, he was brought to Rapid București by coach Valentin Stănescu, who gave him his Divizia A debut on 5 July 1964 in a 3–1 defeat to Știința Cluj, in which he scored his team's goal. At Rapid, Oblemenco's first team opportunities were limited as he was kept out of the side by forwards Emil Dumitriu and Ion Ionescu, and he left the club in the summer of 1966 to return to Craiova on the advice of his friend, "U" Craiova player, Silviu Stănescu.

Oblemenco made his second debut for "U" Craiova, this time in Divizia A, under coach Robert Cosmoc in a 4–1 loss to Dinamo București. By the end of the season he scored a total of 17 goals, enough to win his first Divizia A top-scorer award. He also scored a penalty, the only goal of the game, in a victory against his former team, Rapid, who would eventually win the title that season. In the last game of the 1969–70 season, The Blue Lions were playing against Argeș Pitești, with Oblemenco and Argeș star Nicolae Dobrin competing for the top-scorer of the season award, Oblemenco leading with one goal more than Dobrin. The latter opened the score in the 37th minute but The Cannon equalized one minute later and the game ended in a 1–1 draw, thus earning Oblemenco his second league top-scorer award, with 19 goals.

He won two more consecutive top-scorer titles in the 1971–72 and 1972–73 seasons with 20 goals in the first and a personal record of 21 in the second. In the latter season he also came close to winning the league title, but "U" finished in second place, equal on points with Dinamo București but losing controversially on goal difference. This outcome led poet Adrian Păunescu to nickname Craiova as "Campioana unei mari iubiri" (The Champion of a great love).

In the first round of the 1973–74 UEFA Cup season, Craiova eliminated Fiorentina, Oblemenco scoring the only goal of the tie in the last minute of the second leg. Italian journalist Gianfranco Pancani wrote after the game: "Oblemenco is a real demon. He shoots like a cannon from any position". In the 1973–74 Divizia A season, he was used by coach Constantin Cernăianu in 29 games in which he scored 14 goals, helping The Blue Lions to the first trophy in the club's history as they won the league title, and finishing as the team's second top-scorer, five goals behind Iulian Bălan. In the following season, he played his first games in the European Cup, scoring two goals in the first round against the champion of Sweden, Åtvidaberg, but it was not enough to qualify for the next round, as the tie was lost 4–3 on aggregate. During his career, he played nine games and scored four goals in European competitions (including two appearances in the Inter-Cities Fairs Cup). Oblemenco played his last Divizia A match on 12 December 1976 in a 1–0 loss away to Jiul Petroșani. In total, Oblemenco played 272 matches and scored 170 goals in the competition. His last appearance for Universitatea Craiova came on 27 February 1977 in a 3–0 victory, also against Jiul, in the successful 1976–77 Cupa României campaign. He did not feature in the later stages of that competition due to a conflict with coach Constantin Teașcă.

Oblemeco made his last appearances in the 1977–78 Divizia B season, playing 33 matches for FCM Galați and finishing as the league's top-scorer with 23 goals.

== International career ==
Although he played for Romania's under-23 and B teams, Oblemenco never played for Romania's senior team. On 13 May 2020, Gazeta Sporturilor included him in a first XI of the best Romanian players who never played for the senior national team.

== Managerial career ==
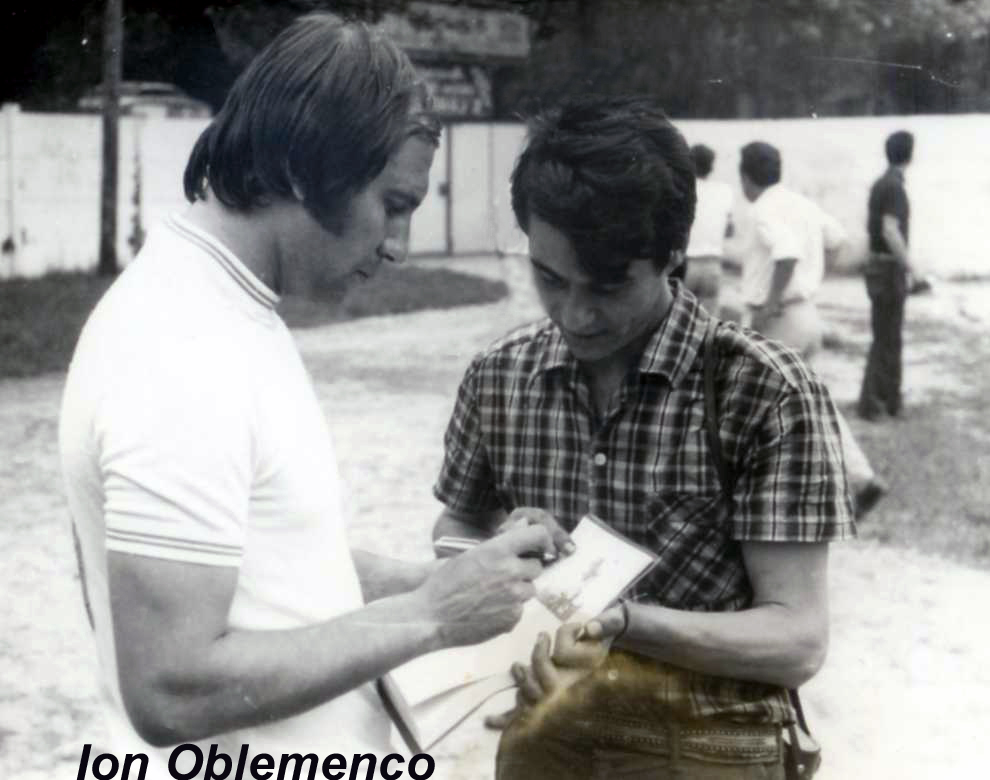
Oblemenco signing an autograph for a fan.

In the 1978–79 Divizia A season, Oblemenco returned to Universitatea Craiova to work as a vice-president, but in the middle of the season he was appointed as an assistant to manager Valentin Stănescu, his former Rapid coach. Together they won the league title, the second in Craiova's history, in the following season. Stănescu left the club for Dinamo București, so Oblemenco was named head coach. In his first season in sole charge, he managed to win the first league and cup double in the club's history. The Cupa României was won after a 6–0 victory in the final against Politehnica Timișoara. In the next season, Oblemenco's team became the first Romanian club to reach the quarter-finals of the European Cup after eliminating Olympiacos and Kjøbenhavns Boldklub. They were eliminated 3–1 on aggregate by Bayern Munich. He was dismissed after the team finished the 1981–82 season in second place.

In the autumn of 1982, Oblemenco was appointed as head coach of Chimia Râmnicu Vâlcea, a position he held until the 27th round of the 1984–85 season. In July 1985, he joined Olt Scornicești, but stayed only until September of that year, going afterwards to work at Sportul Muncitoresc Slatina in the middle of the 1985–86 Divizia B season. He left the team in October 1986. In May 1987, Pandurii Târgu Jiu, who at that time were in last place of the 1986–87 Divizia B, appointed Oblemenco as head coach. He managed them to five consecutive wins, thus avoiding relegation. He then had two second spells at Sportul Muncitoresc Slatina and Olt Scornicești, working as an assistant at the latter. In the second half of the 1988–89 Divizia C season, he coached Progresul from his native Corabia for the first and only time, leaving after failing to earn promotion to Divizia B.

In the 9th round of the 1990–91 Divizia B season, Oblemenco took over Chimia Râmnicu Vâlcea, which occupied 8th place. He led them to a second place finish, which was not enough to gain promotion to Divizia A, as Electroputere Craiova finished in first place. From 1991 until 1992, Oblemenco worked at Universitatea Craiova as a sports director, head coach, technical director, and for a short while, as head coach of the team's satellite team, Constructorul-Universitatea Craiova.

At the end of the 1994–95 Divizia C season, he was appointed as coach at ARO Muscelul Câmpulung alongside technical director Nicolae Dobrin, helping the team earn promotion to the second league after a promotion play-off win against ICIM Brașov. In January 1996 he was appointed as sports director at Electroputere Craiova. In the middle of the same year he went to coach in Morocco at Hassania Agadir where, on 1 September 1996, he died after suffering a heart attack during a game against Union Sidi Kacem.

Oblemenco had a total of 183 matches as a manager in the Romanian top division, with a record of 83 victories, 33 draws and 67 losses.

== Personal life ==
Oblemenco's father was a Ukrainian named Andrei, while his mother, Margareta, was from Oltenia. Ion was the couple's first child and had two sisters. In 1969 he married Margareta Lepădatu, a volleyball player at Universitatea Craiova and in 1972 she gave birth to the couple's only child, a daughter named Clara, who married footballer Adrian Pigulea.

During his life, Oblemenco had serious health problems. In October 1972 he was diagnosed with peptic ulcer disease, for which he underwent surgery twice, and was absent from the field until March 1973 when he scored a hat-trick in a 6–4 away victory against Rapid in his first game after the operation. In February 1996 he had a car accident in which he fractured one of his legs. While he was in the last spell of his coaching career in Morocco, on 1 September 1996 during a match between the team he was managing, Hassania Agadir, and fellow Romanian Alexandru Moldovan's team, Union Sidi Kacem, Oblemenco suffered a heart attack after becoming angry when, with the score at 1–1, his team's late goal was ruled out by the referee. Moldovan was the first to alert the medical team, who came and gave first aid and took Oblemenco to the hospital where he died that day at age 51.

He was posthumously named an honorary citizen of his native Corabia and of Craiova, and both towns have statues of Oblemenco, Craiova's being displayed in front of the Ion Oblemenco stadium. The stadium is named in his honor, as is the stadium in Corabia. Hassania Agadir also named a conference room after him.

Two books have been written about Oblemenco, the first Ion Oblemenco și campioana unei mari iubiri (Ion Oblemenco and the champion of a great love) by Marius Popescu, was published in 1975. A second volume, Oblemenco, meciul cu viața (Oblemenco, the match with life) appeared in 2009, written by Ion Jianu.

== Honours ==
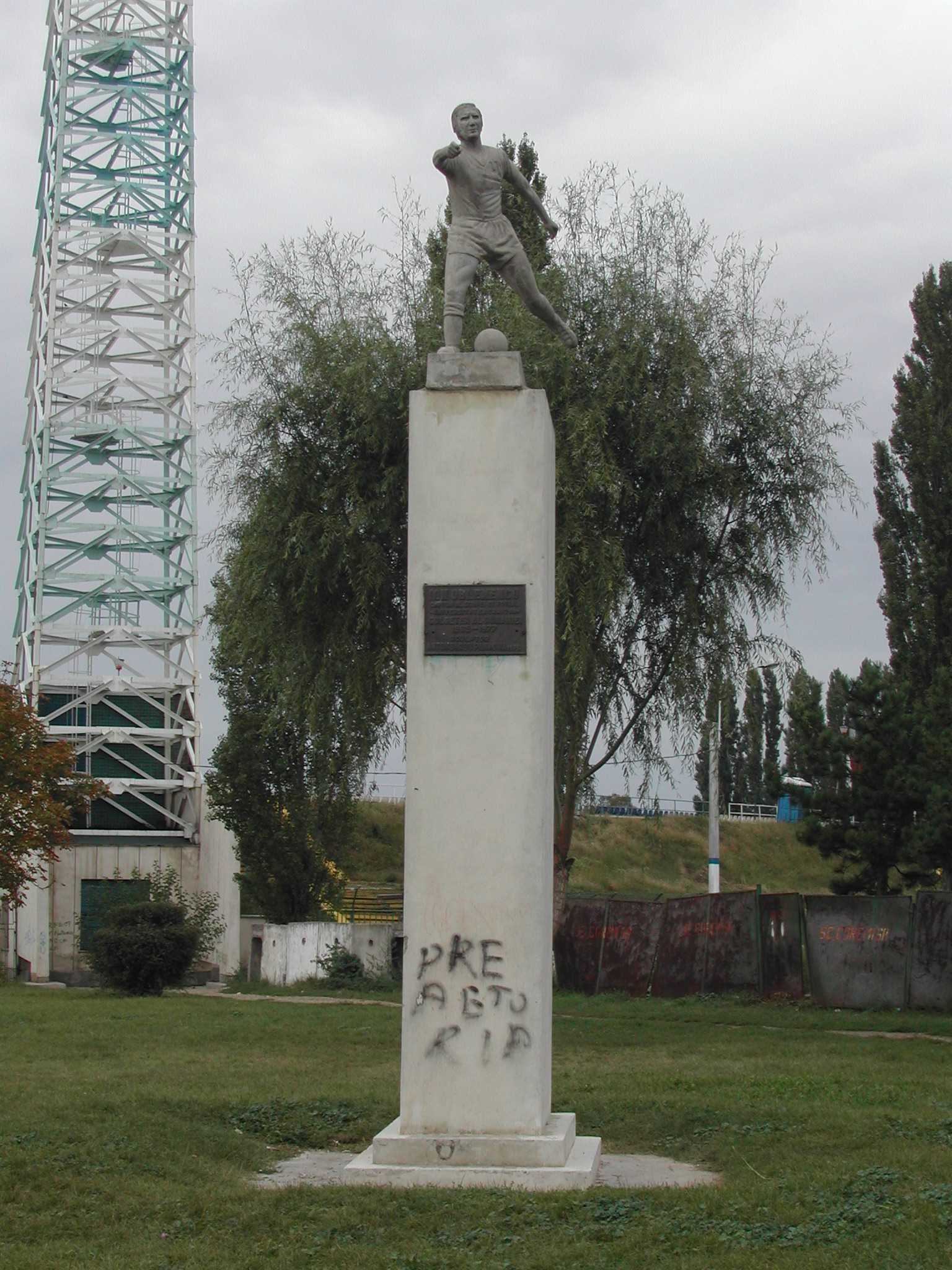
Oblemenco's statue in Craiova.

=== Player ===
Universitatea Craiova

- Divizia A: 1973–74
- Cupa României: 1976–77

=== Manager ===
Universitatea Craiova

- Divizia A: 1980–81
- Cupa României: 1980–81

=== Individual ===
- Divizia A top-scorer: 1966–67, 1969–70, 1971–72, 1972–73
- Divizia B top-scorer: 1977–78
