= Perișor =

- Commune
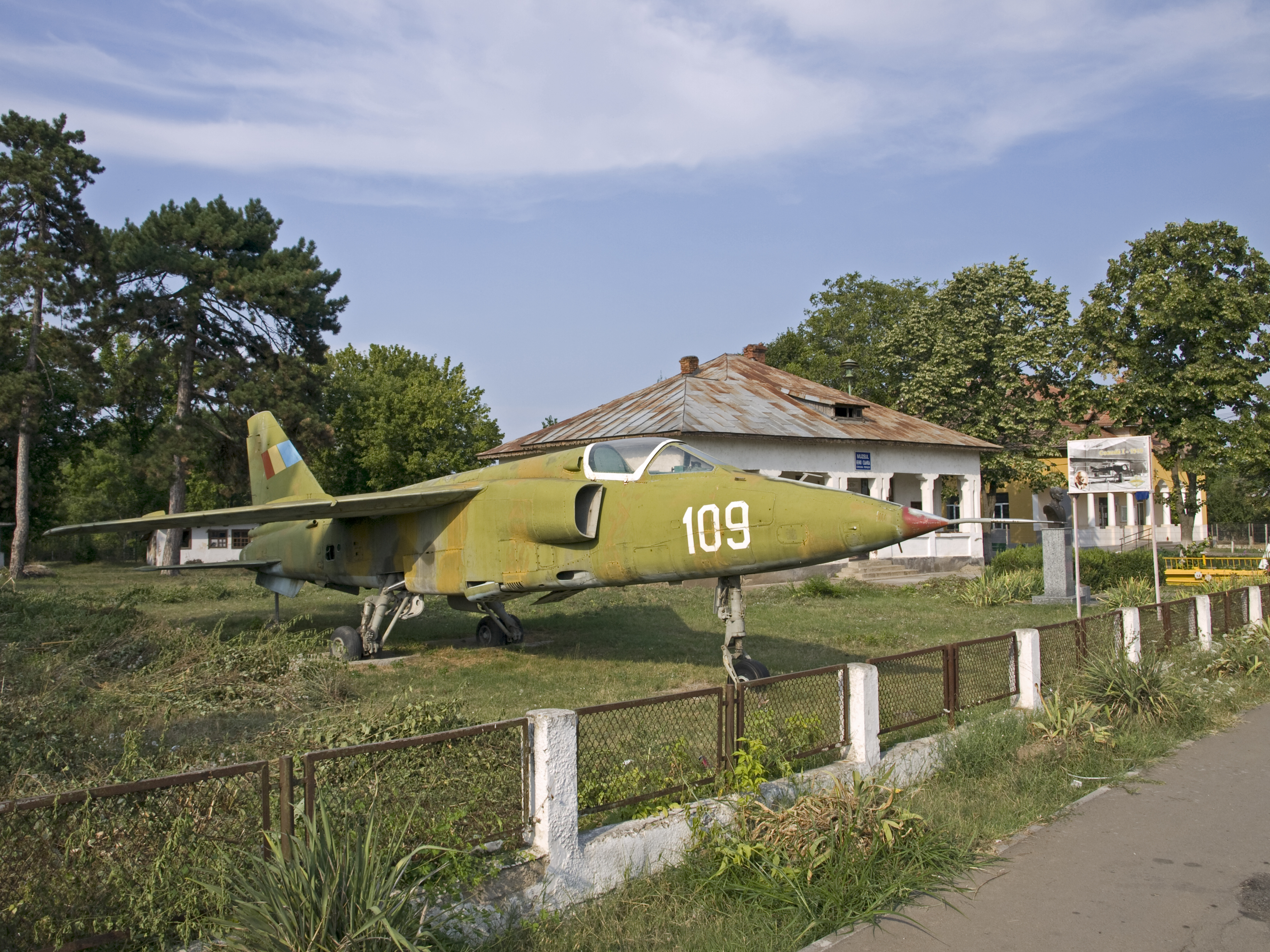
- Henri Coandă Museum

- Location in Romania
- Coordinates: 44°9′N 23°28′E
- Country: Romania
- County: Dolj
- Area: 70.72 km^{2} (27.31 sq mi)
- Population (2021-12-01): 1,606
  - Density: 22.71/km^{2} (58.82/sq mi)
- Time zone: UTC+02:00 (EET)
  - Summer (DST): UTC+03:00 (EEST)
- Vehicle reg.: DJ

Perișor is a commune in Dolj County, Oltenia, Romania with a population of 1,890 people. It is composed of two villages, Mărăcinele and Perișor.
