= Dumbrava, Mehedinți =

Dumbrava
- Commune
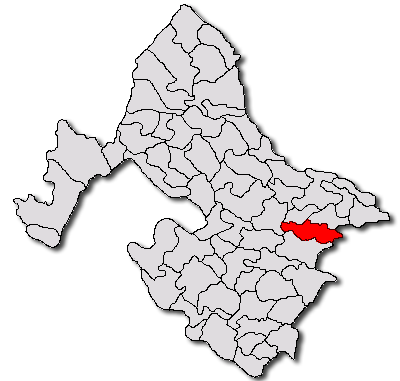
- Location in Mehedinți County

- Location in Romania
- Coordinates: 44°31′N 23°7′E
- Country: Romania
- County: Mehedinți
- Area: 80.67 km^{2} (31.15 sq mi)
- Population (2021-12-01): 1,191
  - Density: 14.76/km^{2} (38.24/sq mi)
- Time zone: UTC+02:00 (EET)
  - Summer (DST): UTC+03:00 (EEST)
- Vehicle reg.: MH

Dumbrava is a commune located in Mehedinți County, Oltenia, Romania. It is composed of eleven villages: Albulești, Brâgleasa, Dumbrava de Jos, Dumbrava de Mijloc, Dumbrava de Sus, Golineasa, Higiu, Rocșoreni, Valea Marcului, Varodia and Vlădica.
