= 1997–98 Divizia C =

Third tier Romanian football league

Divizia C
- Season: 1997–98

The 1997–98 Divizia C was the 42nd season of Liga III, the third tier of the Romanian football league system.

== Team changes ==
=== To Divizia C ===
Relegated from Divizia B

- Cetatea Târgu Neamț
- ~~Steaua Mizil~~
- Minaur Zlatna
- CFR Timișoara

Promoted from Divizia D

- Laminorul Roman
- Victoria Carei
- Rulmentul Bârlad
- Bucovina Rădăuți
- Inter Gaz Glin
- Olimpia Gherla
- Alprom Slatina
- Crișul Aleșd
- ~~Rulmentul Alexandria~~
- Severnav Drobeta-Turnu Severin
- Rapid Miercurea Ciuc
- ~~Victoria IUG Galați~~
- CFR Caransebeș
- Hârtia Prundu Bârgăului
- Minerul Filipeștii de Pădure
- Constructorul Craiova

=== From Divizia C ===
Promoted to Divizia B

- Nitramonia Făgăraș
- Midia Năvodari
- Vega Deva
- UM Timișoara

Relegated to Divizia D

- ~~Metalul Toflea~~
- Steaua Mecanica Huși
- Melana Săvinești
- Zimbrul Siret
- Atletic Bucureşti
- Aversa București
- Electrica Voința Constanța
- Chimia București
- ~~Alexandria~~
- Minerul Anina
- Paroșeni Vulcan
- Metalul Bocșa
- CPL Arad
- Motorul Arad
- Mecanica Mârșa
- Minerul Baia Sprie

=== Renamed teams ===
Callatis Mangalia was renamed as Callatis Daewoo Mangalia.

Alprom Slatina was renamed as Aluminiu Slatina.

=== Other changes ===
Metalul Toflea was spared from relegation due to the withdrawal of Victoria IUG Galați.

Vrancea Focșani merged with Acord Focșani, the first one being absorbed by the second one. The new entity was named as Diplomatic Focșani.

Steaua Mizil merged with Juventus Colentina București, the first one being absorbed by the second one. The new entity was named as Juventus Steaua București.

Ceres Ciocănești took the place of Constructorul Craiova.

Unirea Pitești merged with Petrolul Drăgășani to form Petrolul Unirea Drăgășani.

Arsenal Sadu took the place of CS Olt 90 Scornicești.

Rulmentul Alexandria merged with FC Alexandria, the first one being absorbed by the second one. The new entity was named as Rulmentul Alexandria.

== League tables ==
=== Seria I ===
Pos	Team	Pld	W	D	L	GF	GA	GD	Pts	Qualification or relegation
1	Laminorul Roman (C, P)	34	26	5	3	71	21	+50	83	Promotion to Divizia B
2	Chimica Târnăveni (P)	34	23	3	8	66	25	+41	72	Qualification to promotion play-off
3	CFR Pașcani	34	19	3	12	51	42	+9	60	
4	Diplomatic Focșani	34	17	5	12	63	46	+17	56	
5	ICIM Brașov	34	16	7	11	55	33	+22	55	
6	Romradiatoare Brașov	34	16	5	13	54	39	+15	53	
7	Viromet Victoria	34	15	7	12	47	35	+12	52	
8	Constructorul Reghin	34	15	6	13	53	44	+9	51	
9	Rafinăria Dărmănești	34	16	1	17	64	52	+12	49	
10	Rulmentul Bârlad	34	15	3	16	52	43	+9	48	
11	Minerul 92 Comănești	34	15	3	16	51	53	−2	48	
12	Dorna Vatra Dornei	34	15	2	17	43	83	−40	47	
13	Petrolul Berca	34	14	3	17	48	46	+2	45	
14	Vrancart Adjud	34	14	2	18	39	46	−7	44	
15	Rapid Miercurea Ciuc (R)	34	13	4	17	47	65	−18	43	Possible relegation
16	Letea Bacău (R)	34	11	2	21	43	55	−12	35	Relegation to Divizia D
17	Bucovina Rădăuți (R)	34	9	4	21	30	75	−45	31	Relegation to Divizia D
18	Harghita Odorheiu Secuiesc (R)	34	3	3	28	13	87	−74	12	Relegation to Divizia D
19	Metalul Toflea (Note: Metalul Toflea and Cetatea Târgu Neamț withdrew after the first part of the season and all their results were canceled.) (D)	0	0	0	0	0	0	0	0	Withdrew
20	Cetatea Târgu Neamț (D)	0	0	0	0	0	0	0	0	Withdrew

Source: romaniansoccer.ro
Rules for classification: 1) Points; 2) Goal difference; 3) Number of goals scored.
(C) Champions; (D) Disqualified; (P) Promoted; (R) Relegated

=== Seria II ===
Pos	Team	Pld	W	D	L	GF	GA	GD	Pts	Qualification or relegation
1	Cimentul Fieni (C, P)	38	24	6	8	78	33	+45	78	Promotion to Divizia B
2	Petrolul Ianca	38	22	6	10	81	57	+24	72	Qualification to promotion play-off
3	Electromagnetica București	38	22	5	11	91	40	+51	71	
4	Callatis Daewoo Mangalia	38	22	4	12	77	44	+33	70	
5	Faur București	38	21	3	14	82	56	+26	66	
6	Flacăra Moreni	38	18	6	14	58	48	+10	60	
7	Metalul Filipeștii de Pădure	38	18	4	16	60	48	+12	58	
8	Inter Gaz Glin	38	16	10	12	53	35	+18	58	
9	Navol Oltenița	38	17	6	15	57	58	−1	57	
10	Petrolistul Boldești	38	17	4	17	60	54	+6	55	
11	Acumulatorul București	38	16	7	15	61	51	+10	55	
12	Cimentul Medgidia	38	15	10	13	59	57	+2	55	
13	Juventus Steaua București	38	15	10	13	68	57	+11	55	
14	Victoria 96 Florești	38	16	6	16	56	67	−11	54	
15	Inter Dunărea Giurgiu	38	16	5	17	63	75	−12	53	Possible relegation
16	Ceres Ciocănești (R)	38	15	8	15	45	56	−11	53	Qualification to relegation tie-breaker
17	Portul Constanța (R)	38	16	4	18	51	74	−23	52	Relegation to Divizia D
18	Minerul Filipeștii de Pădure (R)	38	6	4	28	33	87	−54	22	Relegation to Divizia D
19	Gloria Iris Cornești (R)	37	6	2	29	29	96	−67	20	Relegation to Divizia D
20	Șantierul Naval Conpref Constanța (R)	37	5	2	30	23	92	−69	17	Relegation to Divizia D

Source: romaniansoccer.ro
Rules for classification: 1) Points; 2) Goal difference; 3) Number of goals scored.
(C) Champions; (P) Promoted; (R) Relegated

=== Seria III ===
Pos	Team	Pld	W	D	L	GF	GA	GD	Pts	Qualification or relegation
1	Rulmentul Alexandria (C, P)	38	25	5	8	69	27	+42	80	Promotion to Divizia B
2	Drobeta-Turnu Severin (P)	38	24	4	10	68	34	+34	76	Qualification to promotion play-off
3	Minerul Berbești	38	20	2	16	70	55	+15	62	
4	Minerul Certej	38	19	2	17	59	49	+10	59	
5	Aluminiu Slatina	38	18	4	16	40	60	−20	58	
6	Termo Drobeta-Turnu Severin	38	18	4	16	55	48	+7	58	
7	Minerul Mătăsari	38	17	5	16	56	48	+8	56	
8	Petrolul Unirea Drăgășani	38	18	2	18	58	56	+2	56	
9	Mine-Ral Rovinari	38	17	5	16	71	47	+24	56	
10	Petrolul Videle	38	16	7	15	58	52	+6	55	
11	Șoimii Sibiu	38	17	4	17	45	47	−2	55	
12	Petrolul Țicleni	38	17	4	17	56	53	+3	55	
13	Minerul Lupeni	38	18	1	19	55	60	−5	55	
14	Minerul Uricani	38	18	1	19	65	71	−6	55	
15	Petrolul Stoina	38	18	1	19	60	62	−2	55	Possible relegation
16	Severnav Drobeta-Turnu Severin (R)	38	17	3	18	61	58	+3	54	Relegation to Divizia D
17	Parângul Lonea (R)	38	17	3	18	58	80	−22	54	Relegation to Divizia D
18	CFR Caransebeș (R)	38	17	0	21	69	59	+10	51	Relegation to Divizia D
19	FC Vâlcea (R)	38	13	5	20	43	53	−10	44	Relegation to Divizia D
20	Arsenal Sadu (R)	38	5	0	33	15	112	−97	15	Relegation to Divizia D

Source: romaniansoccer.ro
Rules for classification: 1) Points; 2) Goal difference; 3) Number of goals scored.
(C) Champions; (P) Promoted; (R) Relegated

=== Seria IV ===
Pos	Team	Pld	W	D	L	GF	GA	GD	Pts	Qualification or relegation
1	Bihor Oradea (C, P)	34	23	6	5	77	28	+49	75	Promotion to Divizia B
2	Industria Sârmei Câmpia Turzii	34	19	5	10	61	31	+30	62	Qualification to promotion play-off
3	Olimpia Gherla	34	17	8	9	60	27	+33	59	
4	Sticla Arieșul Turda	34	17	7	10	48	44	+4	58	
5	West Petrom Pecica	34	16	5	13	65	44	+21	53	
6	Armătura Zalău	34	15	5	14	49	48	+1	50	
7	Crișul Aleșd	34	15	5	14	50	37	+13	50	
8	Telecom Arad	34	15	5	14	44	36	+8	50	
9	Minerul Ștei	34	15	4	15	61	66	−5	49	
10	CFR Timișoara	34	14	6	14	62	46	+16	48	
11	Phoenix Baia Mare	34	15	3	16	55	53	+2	48	
12	Electrica Timișoara	34	14	5	15	50	36	+14	47	
13	Hârtia Prundu Bârgăului	34	14	5	15	40	39	+1	47	
14	Metalurgistul Cugir	34	14	3	17	46	57	−11	45	
15	Minaur Zlatna	34	13	5	16	54	49	+5	44	Possible relegation
16	Victoria Carei (R)	34	13	4	17	42	52	−10	43	Relegation to Divizia D
17	Viitorul Oradea (R)	34	8	6	20	33	64	−31	30	Relegation to Divizia D
18	Mobila Șimleu Silvaniei (R)	34	4	3	27	22	162	−140	15	Relegation to Divizia D
19	Minerul Baia Borșa (Note: Minerul Baia Borșa and Astral Deta withdrew after the first part of the season and all their results were canceled.) (D)	0	0	0	0	0	0	0	0	Withdrew
20	Astral Deta (D)	0	0	0	0	0	0	0	0	Withdrew

Source: romaniansoccer.ro
Rules for classification: 1) Points; 2) Goal difference; 3) Number of goals scored.
(C) Champions; (D) Disqualified; (P) Promoted; (R) Relegated

== Relegation tie-breaker ==
30 May 1998	Inter Dunărea Giurgiu	1–0	Ceres Ciocănești	Florești
11:00 EEST (UTC+3)				Stadium: Comunal

== Promotion play-off ==
30 May 1998	Chimica Târnăveni	1–0	Petrolul Ianca	Brașov
11:00 EEST (UTC+3)				Stadium: ICIM; Referee: Andrei Chivulete (București)

30 May 1998	Drobeta-Turnu Severin	2–2 (a.e.t.) (7–6 p)	Industria Sârmei Câmpia Turzii	Arad
11:00 EEST (UTC+3)	Tameș 60'; L. Rus 61' (o.g.)	Report	Roșu 10' (pen.); Bratu 15'	Stadium: UTA; Attendance: 1,500; Referee: Constantin Zotta (București)

== See also ==
- 1997–98 Divizia A
- 1997–98 Divizia B
- 1997–98 Divizia D
- 1997–98 Cupa României
