= 2000–01 Divizia D =

59th season of the Liga IV, the fourth tier of the Romanian football league

Liga IV
- Season: 2000–01

The 2000–01 Divizia D was the 59th season of the Liga IV, the fourth tier of the Romanian football league system. The champions of each county association play against one from a neighboring county in a play-off match played on a neutral venue. The winners of the play-off matches promoted to Divizia C.

== Promotion play-off ==
The matches was scheduled to be played on 20 June 2001.

Team 1	Score	Team 2
RATC Iași (IS)	2–1	(BT) Prodalcom Vorona
Sirius Bodești (NT)	0–1	(SV) Bucovina Rădăuți
Consart Bacău (BC)	3–4	(VS) Unirea Negrești
Ancora Galați (GL)	0–2	(VN) Juventus Focșani
Ianca (BR)	1–0	(TL) Dinamo Tulcea
Oil Terminal Constanța (CT)	1–0 (a.e.t.)	(CL) Navol Oltenița
Spic de Grâu București (B)	2–3	(IL) Ambianța Valea Ciorii
Unirea Tricolor Bolintin Vale (GR)	2–1	(IF) Viscofil Popești Leordeni
Aromet Poșta Câlnau (BZ)	0–2	(PH) Hidrojet Breaza
Petrolul Steaua Târgoviște (DB)	1–0 (a.e.t.)	(TR) Dunărea Zimnicea
Progresul Caracal (OT)	0–0 (4–5 p)	(DJ) Pan Group Armata Craiova
Parângul Novaci (GJ)	3–0	(MH) Constructorul Drobeta-Turnu Severin
Forestierul Băbeni (VL)	1–2 (a.e.t.)	(AG) Forestierul Stâlpeni
Bucegi Predeal (BV)	4–2	(SB) Carpați Mecanica Mârșa
Metalul Oțelu Roșu (CS)	1–1 (4–2 p)	(TM) CFR Timișoara
Perko Sânzieni (CV)	2–5	(HR) Viitorul Gheorgheni
Tricotaje Ineu (AR)	2–1	(HD) Vulcan
Rapid CFR Teiuș (AB)	1–0	(CJ) Romsco Cluj-Napoca
Eciro Forest Telciu (BN)	2–4	(MS) Unirea Ungheni
Viitorul Oradea (BH)	2–1	(SM) Frontiera Satu Mare
Marmația Sighetu Marmației (MM)	5–0	(SJ) Rapid Jibou

== County leagues ==
- Alba (AB)
- Arad (AR)
- Argeș (AG)
- Bacău (BC)
- Bihor (BH)
- Bistrița-Năsăud (BN)
- Botoșani (BT)
- Brașov (BV)
- Brăila (BR)
- Bucharest (B)
- Buzău (BZ)
- Caraș-Severin (CS)
- Călărași (CL)
- Cluj (CJ)
- Constanța (CT)
- Covasna (CV)
- Dâmbovița (DB)
- Dolj (DJ)
- Galați (GL)
- Giurgiu (GR)
- Gorj (GJ)
- Harghita (HR)
- Hunedoara (HD)
- Ialomița (IL)
- Iași (IS)
- Ilfov (IF)
- Maramureș (MM)
- Mehedinți (MH)
- Mureș (MS)
- Neamț (NT)
- Olt (OT)
- Prahova (PH)
- Satu Mare (SM)
- Sălaj (SJ)
- Sibiu (SB)
- Suceava (SV)
- Teleorman (TR)
- Timiș (TM)
- Tulcea (TL)
- Vaslui (VS)
- Vâlcea (VL)
- Vrancea (VN)

=== Bihor County ===
Pos	Team	Pld	W	D	L	GF	GA	GD	Pts	Qualification or relegation
1	Viitorul Oradea (C, Q)	26	18	3	5	67	23	+44	57	Qualification to promotion play-off
2	Minerul Ștei	26	16	7	3	55	18	+37	55	
3	Unirea Valea lui Mihai	26	16	3	7	72	26	+46	51	
4	Arcadia Oradea	26	15	2	9	54	31	+23	47	
5	Petrolul Suplac	26	14	3	9	57	33	+24	45	
6	Olimpia Salonta	26	14	2	10	63	36	+27	44	
7	Romtrans Oradea	26	13	4	9	48	47	+1	43	
8	Crișana Tinca	26	8	5	13	34	47	−13	29	
9	Minerul Vadu Crișului	26	8	4	14	42	73	−31	28	
10	Biharea Vașcău	26	8	3	15	27	57	−30	27	
11	Bihoreana Marghita	26	7	4	15	28	47	−19	25	
12	Bihorul Beiuș	26	6	6	14	30	44	−14	24	
13	Minerul Șuncuiuș	26	7	3	16	26	77	−51	24	
14	Foresta Tileagd	26	6	3	17	22	71	−49	21	
15	Victoria Avram Iancu (Note: Victoria Avram Iancu withdrew during the season and all its results were canceled.) (D)	0	0	0	0	0	0	0	0	Withdrew
16	INCAST Oradea (Note: INCAST Oradea withdrew before the start of the season.) (D)	0	0	0	0	0	0	0	0	Withdrew

Rules for classification: 1) points; 2) goal difference; 3) number of goals scored.
(C) Champions; (D) Disqualified; (Q) Qualified for the phase indicated

=== Caraș-Severin County ===
Pos	Team	Pld	W	D	L	GF	GA	GD	Pts	Qualification or relegation
1	Metalul Oțelu Roșu (C, Q)	28	19	2	7	71	26	+45	59	Qualification to promotion play-off
2	Arsenal Reșița	28	15	4	9	64	34	+30	49	
3	Universitatea Reșița	28	14	6	8	55	41	+14	48	
4	Muncitorul Reșița	28	13	7	8	48	32	+16	46	
5	Oravița	28	14	3	11	53	40	+13	45	
6	Minerul Anina	28	13	4	11	44	36	+8	43	
7	Metalul Bocșa	28	11	9	8	46	35	+11	42	
8	Dunărea Moldova Nouă	28	13	3	12	43	54	−11	42	
9	Cerna Topleț Băile Herculane	28	10	9	9	43	42	+1	39	
10	CFR Caransebeș	28	10	5	13	41	45	−4	35	
11	Nera Bozovici	28	10	4	14	38	52	−14	34	
12	Foresta Olimp Zăvoi	28	9	6	13	54	67	−13	33	
13	Berzasca	28	9	3	16	31	61	−30	30	
14	Luceafărul Petnic (Note: Luceafărul Petnic was spared from relegation due to the promotion of Metalul Oțelu Roșu in Divizia C.)	28	10	1	17	31	52	−21	28 (Note: Luceafărul Petnic deducted 2 points.)	Spared from relegation
15	Bistra Glimboca (R)	28	5	4	19	21	66	−45	19	Relegation to Caraș-Severin County Championship
16	Recolta Berzovia (Note: Recolta Berzovia withdrew in the first part of the season and all its results were canceled.) (D)	0	0	0	0	0	0	0	0	Withdrew

Rules for classification: 1) points; 2) goal difference; 3) number of goals scored.
(C) Champions; (D) Disqualified; (Q) Qualified for the phase indicated; (R) Relegated

=== Cluj County ===
Pos	Team	Pld	W	D	L	GF	GA	GD	Pts	Qualification or relegation
1	Romsco Cluj-Napoca (C, Q)	28	23	2	3	73	18	+55	71	Qualification to promotion play-off
2	Victoria Someșeni	28	22	4	2	87	32	+55	70	
3	Apa Cluj-Napoca	28	20	4	4	73	18	+55	64	
4	Turdeana Turda	28	16	3	9	53	30	+23	51	
5	Universitatea Cluj II	28	16	2	10	58	42	+16	50	
6	Unirea Selena Dej II	28	13	7	8	42	35	+7	46	
7	Romhills Cluj-Napoca	28	13	5	10	46	37	+9	44	
8	Ronlit CFR Turda	28	12	5	11	58	49	+9	41	
9	CFR Cluj-Napoca II	28	11	4	13	46	55	−9	37	
10	Sănătatea Cluj-Napoca	28	11	2	15	43	53	−10	35	
11	Motorul IRA Cluj-Napoca	28	11	0	17	42	56	−14	33	
12	Universitatea Cluj III	28	9	1	18	38	56	−18	28	
13	Unirea Florești	28	5	3	20	29	67	−38	18	
14	Minerul Iara II	28	5	2	21	28	80	−52	17	
15	Dromex Cluj-Napoca (Note: Dromex Cluj-Napoca withdrew in the second part of the season and lost all remaining matches with 0–3.)	28	1	0	27	9	97	−88	3	

Rules for classification: 1) points; 2) goal difference; 3) number of goals scored.
(C) Champions; (Q) Qualified for the phase indicated

=== Covasna County ===
Pos	Team	Pld	W	D	L	GF	GA	GD	Pts	Qualification or relegation
1	Perkő Sânzieni (C, Q)	30	20	6	4	85	24	+61	66	Qualification to promotion play-off
2	Stăruința Bodoc	30	20	4	6	92	25	+67	64	
3	Minerul Baraolt	30	18	5	7	85	37	+48	59	
4	Victoria Ozun	30	19	2	9	81	43	+38	59	
5	Carpați Covasna	30	18	5	7	75	40	+35	59	
6	Micfalău	30	16	3	11	78	58	+20	51	
7	IAS Câmpul Frumos	30	14	4	12	58	41	+17	46	
8	Nemere Ghelința	30	12	7	11	53	43	+10	43	
9	Avântul Catalina	30	13	3	14	54	63	−9	42	
10	Avântul Ilieni	30	12	3	15	54	82	−28	39	
11	Bradul Zagon	30	9	8	13	47	65	−18	35	
12	Prima Brăduț	30	11	2	17	44	66	−22	35	
13	Harghita Aita Mare	30	9	4	17	43	87	−44	31	
14	Ojdula	30	8	6	16	49	94	−45	30	
15	Oltul Coșeni (R)	30	7	3	20	31	82	−51	24	Relegation to Liga V Covasna
16	Cernat (Note: Cernat withdrew after 15 rounds and lost all remaining matches with 0–3.) (R)	30	1	1	28	17	98	−81	4	Relegation to Liga V Covasna

Rules for classification: 1) points; 2) goal difference; 3) number of goals scored.
(C) Champions; (Q) Qualified for the phase indicated; (R) Relegated

=== Dolj County ===
Team changes from previous season.

Promoted to Divizia C

- Dunărea Calafat

Relegated from Divizia C

- Constructorul Craiova

Promoted from Dolj Elite Category

- Recolta Ostroveni (Seria I winners)
- Mecanica Filiași (Seria II winners)

Relegated to Dolj Elite Category

- SCCF Gioroc

Other changes

- Pan Group Craiova and Armata Craiova merged to form Pan Group Armata Craiova.
- Wimar Podari and Autobuzul Craiova merged, the first one being absorbed by the second one.
- CFR Craiova was renamed as CFR Marfă Craiova.
- Fulgerul Mârșani was renamed as FC Mârșani.
- Mecanica Filiași was renamed as Aquaterm Filiași.
- Recolta Măceșu de Jos was spared from relegation.
- Aripile Craiova and Victoria Plenița enrolled in the place of Constructorul Craiova and Wimar Podari.

Table

Pos	Team	Pld	W	D	L	GF	GA	GD	Pts	Qualification or relegation
1	Pan Group Armata Craiova (C, Q)	30	25	5	0	86	5	+81	80	Qualification to promotion play-off
2	Chimia Craiova	30	17	8	5	69	22	+47	59	
3	Gaz Metan Pielești	30	18	3	9	62	45	+17	57	
4	CFR Marfă Craiova	30	16	5	9	61	38	+23	53	
5	Autobuzul Craiova	30	13	6	11	56	36	+20	45	
6	Unirea Leamna	30	14	3	13	48	59	−11	45	
7	Progresul Băilești	30	12	6	12	61	54	+7	42	
8	Mârșani	30	12	6	12	55	53	+2	42	
9	Aquaterm Filiași	30	12	5	13	41	39	+2	41	
10	MAT Craiova	30	13	3	14	48	50	−2	41 (Note: MAT Craiova and Victoria Plenița deducted 1 point.)	
11	Tractorul Bechet (R)	30	10	5	15	34	56	−22	35	Qualification to relegation play-out
12	Recolta Măceșu de Jos (O)	30	10	4	16	43	82	−39	34	Qualification to relegation play-out
13	Recolta Ostroveni (O)	30	9	5	16	44	56	−12	32	Qualification to relegation play-out
14	Victoria Plenița (R)	30	10	1	19	37	58	−21	30	Relegation to Dolj County Championship
15	PRO GPS Segarcea (R)	30	7	7	16	43	60	−17	28	Relegation to Dolj County Championship
16	Aripile Craiova (Note: Aripile Craiova withdrew in the second part of the season and lost all remaining matches with 0–3.) (R)	30	4	2	24	15	82	−67	14	Relegation to Dolj County Championship

Rules for classification: 1) points; 2) goal difference; 3) number of goals scored.
(C) Champions; (O) Play-off winners; (Q) Qualified for the phase indicated; (R) Relegated
Notes:

Relegation play-out

The 11th, 12th and 13th-placed teams of the Liga IV faces the 2nd placed teams from the three series of Liga V Dolj. The matches was played on 17 and 23 June 2001.

Team 1	Agg.	Team 2	1st leg	2nd leg
Victoria Călărași	4–3	Tractorul Bechet	3–1	1–2
Deznățuiul Giurgița	2–3	Recolta Măceșu de Jos	2–0	0–3 (a.e.t.)
Venus Craiova	2–6	Recolta Ostroveni	2–3	0–3 (w/o)

=== Galați County ===
Pos	Team	Pld	W	D	L	GF	GA	GD	Pts	Qualification or relegation
1	Ancora Galați (C, Q)	30	25	2	3	96	16	+80	77	Qualification to promotion play-off
2	Progresul Măstăcani	30	24	4	2	78	13	+65	76	
3	Hidraulic Galați	30	22	2	6	85	31	+54	68	
4	Bujorii Târgu Bujor	30	13	6	11	60	48	+12	45	
5	Gloria Ivești	30	12	6	12	44	39	+5	42	
6	Muncitorul Ghidigeni	30	13	3	14	57	58	−1	42	
7	Metalosport Galați	30	11	8	11	65	48	+17	41	
8	Victoria TC Galați	30	12	3	15	59	71	−12	39	
9	Sporting Șivița	30	11	5	14	56	67	−11	38	
10	Voința Liești	30	11	4	15	51	59	−8	37	
11	Dunărea Galați II	30	10	4	16	44	46	−2	34	
12	Viitorul Berești	30	11	0	19	53	74	−21	33	
13	Zino Tudor Vladimirescu	30	10	3	17	42	85	−43	33	
14	Petrolul Schela	30	9	5	16	55	93	−38	32	
15	Olimpia Barcea	30	4	1	25	20	105	−85	13	
16	Victoria Independența (Note: Victoria Independența excluded in the second part of the season and lost all remaining matches with 0–3.) (D)	30	0	0	30	0	90	−90	0	Excluded

Rules for classification: 1) Points; 2) Goal difference; 3) Number of goals scored.
(C) Champions; (D) Disqualified; (Q) Qualified for the phase indicated

=== Harghita County ===
Pos	Team	Pld	W	D	L	GF	GA	GD	Pts	Qualification or relegation
1	Viitorul Gheorgheni (C, Q)	21	16	3	2	75	13	+62	51 (Note: The top two teams were scheduled to play two play-off matches.)	Qualification to promotion play-off
2	Minerul Bălan	21	13	5	3	56	17	+39	44	
3	Unirea Cristuru Secuiesc	20	13	3	4	56	25	+31	42	
4	Complexul Gălăuțaș	20	13	2	5	53	29	+24	41	
5	Mureșul Toplița	20	12	2	6	46	24	+22	38	
6	CSȘ Miercurea Ciuc	20	7	2	11	51	37	+14	23	
7	Șoimii Băile Tușnad	19	7	2	10	35	39	−4	23 (Note: The match Real Tulgheș–Șoimii Băile Tușnad was played on 3 June.)	
8	Harghita Odorheiu Secuiesc	20	6	2	12	38	53	−15	20	
9	Real Tulgheș	19	5	2	12	32	61	−29	17	
10	Unirea Hodoșa	20	5	1	14	26	60	−34	16	
11	Ditroit Ditrău	20	1	0	19	15	124	−109	3	

Rules for classification: 1) Points; 2) Head-to-head points; 3) Head-to-head goal difference; 4) Head-to-head goals scored; 5) Head-to-head away goals scored; 6) Goal difference; 7) Goals scored.
(C) Champions; (Q) Qualified for the phase indicated

=== Mureș County ===
Pos	Team	Pld	W	D	L	GF	GA	GD	Pts	Qualification or relegation
1	Unirea Ungheni (C, Q)	24	20	3	1	77	18	+59	63	Qualification to promotion play-off
2	Lacul Ursu Mobila Sovata	24	15	6	3	70	23	+47	51	
3	Electromureș Târgu Mureș	24	16	3	5	65	22	+43	51	
4	Maviprod Reghin	24	16	2	6	65	23	+42	50	
5	Iernut	24	13	1	10	43	24	+19	40	
6	Transilvania Sighișoara	24	13	1	10	55	39	+16	40	
7	Avântul Miheșu de Câmpie	24	10	1	13	54	58	−4	31	
8	Woonwaghen Zending Band	24	9	3	12	32	37	−5	30	
9	Târnava Mică Sângeorgiu de Pădure	24	9	3	12	23	33	−10	30	
10	Mureșul Romvelo Luduș	24	7	2	15	29	72	−43	23	
11	Nirajul Miercurea Nirajului	24	5	2	17	19	62	−43	17	
12	Scorillo Sântana de Mureș	24	5	4	15	27	80	−53	16 (Note: Scorillo Sântana deducted 3 points.)	
13	Voința Grebeniș	24	1	3	20	18	86	−68	6	
14	Viitorul Jabenița (Note: Viitorul Jabenița withdrew after 8 rounds and all its results were canceled.)	0	0	0	0	0	0	0	0	Withdrew

Rules for classification: 1) Points; 2) Head-to-head points; 3) Head-to-head goal difference; 4) Head-to-head goals scored; 5) Head-to-head away goals scored; 6) Goal difference; 7) Goals scored.
(C) Champions; (Q) Qualified for the phase indicated

=== Neamț County ===
Pos	Team	Pld	W	D	L	GF	GA	GD	Pts	Qualification or relegation
1	Sirius Bodești (C, Q)	22	19	2	1	80	39	+41	59	Qualification to promotion play-off
2	Hidroconstrucția Poiana Teiului	22	17	1	4	91	32	+59	52	
3	Bradul Roznov	22	14	2	6	64	49	+15	44	
4	Pinul Borca	22	12	1	9	61	42	+19	37	
5	Săvinești	22	12	1	9	58	40	+18	37	
6	Viitorul Podoleni	22	9	1	12	48	50	−2	28	
7	Vulturul Zănești	22	9	1	12	47	68	−21	28	
8	Voința Rediu	22	8	3	11	49	71	−22	27	
9	Lorisim Făurei	22	8	1	13	53	67	−14	25	
10	Olimpia Piatra Neamț	22	6	2	14	51	82	−31	20	
11	Unirea Trifești	22	5	3	14	36	57	−21	18	
12	Biruința Negrești	22	3	2	17	27	75	−48	11	

Rules for classification: 1) Points; 2) Goal difference; 3) Number of goals scored.
(C) Champions; (Q) Qualified for the phase indicated

=== Sibiu County ===
Pos	Team	Pld	W	D	L	GF	GA	GD	Pts	Qualification or relegation
1	Carpați Mecanica Mârșa (C, Q)	34	27	2	5	130	33	+97	83	Qualification to promotion play-off
2	Sparta Mediaș	34	24	2	8	108	28	+80	74	
3	Universitatea Sibiu	34	22	5	7	88	34	+54	71	
4	Agnitex Agnita (Note: Incstar Agnita was renamed during the winter break as Agnitex Agnita.)	34	21	6	7	103	46	+57	69	
5	AMSO Sibiu	34	21	2	11	67	52	+15	65	
6	Romanofir Tălmaciu	34	17	8	9	69	46	+23	59	
7	Sevișul Șelimbăr	34	19	1	14	76	59	+17	58	
8	Progresul Dumbrăveni	34	17	6	11	67	52	+15	57	
9	Textila Cisnădie	34	16	7	11	61	42	+19	55	
10	Telecom Sibiu	34	13	7	14	64	66	−2	46	
11	Romipel Cordia Sibiu	34	13	4	17	49	72	−23	43	
12	Avântul Dârlos	34	12	6	16	44	58	−14	42	
13	Romdor Sibiu	34	12	3	19	61	87	−26	39	
14	Unirea Ocna Sibiului	34	8	8	18	43	78	−35	32	
15	ASA Sibiu	34	8	3	23	35	92	−57	27	
16	Progresul Terezian Sibiu	34	7	5	22	65	109	−44	26	
17	Construcții Sibiu	34	5	5	24	30	110	−80	20	
18	Viitorul Târnava	34	3	2	29	25	121	−96	11	

Rules for classification: 1) Points; 2) Goal difference; 3) Number of goals scored.
(C) Champions; (Q) Qualified for the phase indicated

=== Timiș County ===
Pos	Team	Pld	W	D	L	GF	GA	GD	Pts	Qualification or relegation
1	CFR Timișoara (C, Q)	34	27	3	4	92	23	+69	84	Qualification to promotion play-off
2	Vulturii Lugoj	34	23	4	7	83	40	+43	73	
3	Celuloză și Oțel Șag	34	21	6	7	81	29	+52	69	
4	Comprest Lugoj	34	19	7	8	67	32	+35	64	
5	Bayern Timișoara	34	19	5	10	86	50	+36	62	
6	Calor Timișoara	34	16	9	9	79	42	+37	57	
7	Sporting Tabac Textila Timișoara	34	16	8	10	68	54	+14	56	
8	Jimbolia	34	16	8	10	60	44	+16	56	
9	Unirea Sânnicolau Mare	34	17	5	12	78	32	+46	56	
10	Furnirul Deta	34	15	7	12	82	59	+23	52	
11	Termo Timișoara	34	14	4	16	63	60	+3	46	
12	Șoimii Timișoara	34	13	5	16	51	57	−6	44	
13	Obilici Sânmartinu Sârbesc	34	13	3	18	47	72	−25	42	
14	Progresul Tehnomet Gătaia	34	12	6	16	49	62	−13	42	
15	Giarmata	34	10	3	21	45	92	−47	33	
16	Progresul Comtim Ciacova (R)	34	5	3	26	28	99	−71	18	Relegation to Timiș County Championship
17	Voința Valcani (R)	34	4	4	26	36	101	−65	16	Relegation to Timiș County Championship
18	Universitatea Banatul Timișoara (Note: Universitatea Banatul Timișoara withdrew after 23 rounds and lost all remaining matches with 0–3.) (R)	34	1	0	33	16	132	−116	3	Relegation to Timiș County Championship

Rules for classification: 1) points; 2) goal difference; 3) number of goals scored.
(C) Champions; (Q) Qualified for the phase indicated; (R) Relegated

=== Vâlcea County ===
Pos	Team	Pld	W	D	L	GF	GA	GD	Pts	Qualification or relegation
1	Forestierul Băbeni (C, Q)	28	26	2	0	131	13	+118	80	Qualification to promotion play-off
2	Lotru Brezoi	28	18	5	5	70	28	+42	59	
3	Oltețul Bălcești	28	18	1	9	67	37	+30	55	
4	Șirineasa	28	16	4	8	67	47	+20	52	
5	Metalul Băbeni	28	13	6	9	55	42	+13	45	
6	Sănătatea Govora	28	12	7	9	68	37	+31	43	
7	Inter Sutești	28	13	3	12	58	68	−10	42	
8	Cozia Călimănești	28	12	5	11	53	51	+2	41	
9	Recolta Pietrari	28	12	4	12	49	58	−9	40	
10	Cernișoara	28	9	5	14	55	54	+1	32	
11	Electra Râmnicu Vâlcea	28	7	7	14	56	89	−33	28	
12	Oltețul Alunu	28	8	1	19	39	60	−21	25	
13	Petrodam Măciuca	28	7	2	19	42	96	−54	23	
14	Păstorul Vaideeni	28	5	3	20	35	90	−55	18	
15	Avântul Amărăști	28	1	3	24	15	90	−75	6	
16	Minerul Râmnicu Vâlcea (Note: Minerul Râmnicu Vâlcea withdrew in the first part of the season and all its results were canceled.) (D)	0	0	0	0	0	0	0	0	Withdrew

Rules for classification: 1) points; 2) goal difference; 3) number of goals scored.
(C) Champions; (D) Disqualified; (Q) Qualified for the phase indicated

== See also ==
- 2000–01 Divizia A
- 2000–01 Divizia B
- 2000–01 Cupa României
