= 1998–99 Divizia C =

Third tier Romanian football league

Divizia C
- Season: 1998–99

The 1998–99 Divizia C was the 43rd season of Liga III, the third tier of the Romanian football league system.

== Team changes ==
=== To Divizia C ===
Relegated from Divizia B

- Metalul Plopeni
- Dunărea Călărași
- ~~Foresta II Fălticeni~~
- CFR Cluj
- UM Timișoara
- Gloria Reșița

Promoted from Divizia D

- Unirea Slobozia
- Jandarmii Dorobanțu
- Chimia Brazi
- ~~Hidroconcas Buzău~~
- Unirea Botoșani
- Cimentul Bicaz
- Budvar Odorheiu Secuiesc
- Record Mediaș
- Fulgerul Bragadiru
- ~~Electromureș Târgu Mureș~~
- Minerul Sărmășag
- Someșul Satu Mare
- Aurul Brad
- Șoimii Pâncota
- Obilici Sânmartinu Sârbesc
- Bere Craiova
- Flacăra Horezu
- Forestierul Stâlpeni
- Progresul Caracal
- Electro-Turris Turnu Măgurele
- ~~Unirea Milișăuți~~

=== From Divizia C ===
Promoted to Divizia B

- Laminorul Roman
- Cimentul Fieni
- Rulmentul Alexandria
- Bihor Oradea
- Chimica Târnăveni
- Drobeta-Turnu Severin

Relegated to Divizia D

- Rapid Miercurea Ciuc
- Letea Bacău
- ~~Bucovina Rădăuți~~
- ~~Harghita Odorheiu Secuiesc~~
- Metalul Toflea
- Cetatea Târgu Neamț
- Ceres Ciocănești
- Portul Constanța
- Minerul Filipeștii de Pădure
- Gloria Iris Cornești
- Șantierul Naval Conpref Constanța
- Severnav Drobeta-Turnu Severin
- Parângul Lonea
- CFR Caransebeș
- FC Vâlcea
- Arsenal Sadu
- Victoria Carei
- Viitorul Oradea
- Mobila Șimleu Silvaniei
- Minerul Baia Borșa
- Astral Deta

=== Renamed teams ===
Inter Gaz Glin was renamed as Inter Gaz București.

Bere Craiova was renamed as Electro Bere Craiova.

=== Other changes ===
ICIM Brașov merged with the second division team Metrom Brașov. The new entity was named Metrom ICIM Brașov.

Textila Prejmer took the place of ICIM Brașov.

Fortyogó Târgu Secuiesc took the place of Foresta II Fălticeni.

Hidroconcas Buzău ceded its place to Acvaterm Râmnicu Sărat.

Electromureș Târgu Mureș ceded its place to Apemin Borsec, which was renamed as Electro Apemin Borsec.

Budvar Odorheiu Secuiesc merged with Harghita Odorheiu Secuiesc.

Unirea Milișăuți ceded its place to Bucovina Rădăuți.

Rafinăria Sterom Câmpina took the place of Victoria 96 Florești.

Mine-Ral Rovinari ceded its place to Pandurii Târgu Jiu.

Constructorul Craiova took the place of Termo Drobeta-Turnu Severin.

== League tables ==
=== Seria I ===
Pos	Team	Pld	W	D	L	GF	GA	GD	Pts	Qualification or relegation
1	Diplomatic Focșani (C, P)	36	25	6	5	76	35	+41	81	Promotion to Divizia B
2	Petrolul Ianca	36	22	5	9	73	27	+46	71	Qualification to promotion play-off
3	Viromet Victoria	36	19	5	12	57	31	+26	62	
4	Electro Apemin Borsec	36	20	2	14	65	42	+23	62	
5	Acvaterm Râmnicu Sărat	36	18	6	12	55	41	+14	60	
6	Rafinăria Dărmănești	36	17	6	13	50	42	+8	57	
7	Petrolul Berca	36	18	2	16	48	47	+1	56	
8	Unirea Botoșani	36	17	5	14	49	55	−6	56	
9	Rulmentul Bârlad	36	17	4	15	57	49	+8	55	
10	Cimentul Bicaz	36	16	6	14	51	39	+12	54	
11	Romradiatoare Brașov	36	16	4	16	47	40	+7	52	
12	Vrancart Adjud	36	16	2	18	50	47	+3	50	
13	CFR Pașcani	36	14	7	15	50	54	−4	49	
14	Minerul 92 Comănești	36	16	0	20	58	72	−14	48	
15	Budvar Odorheiu Secuiesc	36	14	6	16	43	57	−14	48	
16	Textila Prejmer	36	14	6	16	53	56	−3	48	
17	Dorna Vatra Dornei (R)	36	12	6	18	38	59	−21	42	Relegation to Divizia D
18	Fortyogó Târgu Secuiesc (R)	36	7	1	28	20	86	−66	22	Relegation to Divizia D
19	Bucovina Rădăuți (R)	36	3	3	30	24	93	−69	12	Relegation to Divizia D
20	Constructorul Reghin (Note: Constructorul Reghin withdrew after 2 rounds and all its results were canceled.) (D)	0	0	0	0	0	0	0	0	Withdrew

Source: romaniansoccer.ro
Rules for classification: 1) Points; 2) Goal difference; 3) Number of goals scored.
(C) Champions; (D) Disqualified; (P) Promoted; (R) Relegated

=== Seria II ===
Pos	Team	Pld	W	D	L	GF	GA	GD	Pts	Qualification or relegation
1	Callatis Daewoo Mangalia (C, P)	36	25	3	8	91	25	+66	78	Promotion to Divizia B
2	Juventus Steaua București (P)	36	23	6	7	89	40	+49	75	Qualification to promotion play-off
3	Electromagnetica București	36	18	6	12	59	45	+14	60	
4	Metalul Filipeștii de Pădure	36	16	7	13	44	41	+3	55	
5	Faur București	36	14	10	12	57	41	+16	52	
6	Fulgerul Bragadiru	36	16	4	16	54	54	0	52	
7	Jandarmii Dorobanțu	36	16	4	16	59	57	+2	52	
8	Petrolul Videle	36	15	7	14	54	50	+4	52	
9	Electro-Turris Turnu Măgurele	36	16	3	17	58	56	+2	51	
10	Inter Dunărea Giurgiu	36	15	6	15	50	58	−8	51	
11	Inter Gaz București	36	14	7	15	56	58	−2	49	
12	Unirea Slobozia	36	14	7	15	52	54	−2	49	
13	Dunărea Călărași	36	14	6	16	46	57	−11	48	
14	Cimentul Medgidia	36	15	3	18	50	55	−5	48	
15	Chimia Brazi	36	15	3	18	54	70	−16	48	
16	Metalul Plopeni	36	14	5	17	55	63	−8	47	
17	Navol Oltenița (R)	36	15	1	20	56	74	−18	46	Relegation to Divizia D
18	Petrolistul Boldești (R)	36	14	3	19	42	71	−29	45	Relegation to Divizia D
19	Acumulatorul București (R)	36	4	7	25	27	84	−57	19	Relegation to Divizia D
20	Rafinăria Sterom Câmpina (Note: Rafinăria Sterom Câmpina withdrew after 13 rounds and all its results were canceled.) (D)	0	0	0	0	0	0	0	0	Withdrew

Source: romaniansoccer.ro
Rules for classification: 1) Points; 2) Goal difference; 3) Number of goals scored.
(C) Champions; (D) Disqualified; (P) Promoted; (R) Relegated

=== Seria III ===
Pos	Team	Pld	W	D	L	GF	GA	GD	Pts	Qualification or relegation
1	Electro Bere Craiova (C, P)	38	29	6	3	91	27	+64	93	Promotion to Divizia B
2	Flacăra Horezu (P)	38	27	4	7	100	43	+57	85	Qualification to promotion play-off
3	Șoimii Sibiu	38	25	10	3	96	34	+62	85	
4	Gloria Reșița	38	20	6	12	71	42	+29	66	
5	Pandurii Târgu Jiu	38	20	3	15	72	42	+30	63	
6	Minerul Certej	38	18	6	14	83	58	+25	60	
7	Constructorul Craiova	38	16	4	18	62	58	+4	52	
8	Minerul Lupeni	38	16	3	19	57	81	−24	51	
9	Minerul Uricani	38	17	0	21	79	85	−6	51	
10	Aluminiu Slatina	38	16	3	19	53	62	−9	51	
11	Petrolul Stoina	38	16	3	19	72	73	−1	51	
12	Petrolul Țicleni	38	16	2	20	54	81	−27	50	
13	Minerul Berbești	38	15	5	18	63	85	−22	50	
14	Petrolul Unirea Drăgășani	38	16	2	20	50	72	−22	50	
15	Aurul Brad	38	15	4	19	61	58	+3	49	
16	Forestierul Stâlpeni	38	16	1	21	59	75	−16	49	
17	Minerul Mătăsari	38	15	4	19	42	54	−12	49	
18	Flacăra Moreni (R)	38	13	7	18	60	62	−2	46	Relegation to Divizia D
19	Progresul Caracal (R)	38	7	6	25	41	96	−55	27	Relegation to Divizia D
20	Record Mediaș (R)	38	5	5	28	42	120	−78	20	Relegation to Divizia D

Source: romaniansoccer.ro
Rules for classification: 1) Points; 2) Goal difference; 3) Number of goals scored.
(C) Champions; (P) Promoted; (R) Relegated

=== Seria IV ===
Pos	Team	Pld	W	D	L	GF	GA	GD	Pts	Qualification or relegation
1	UM Timișoara (C, P)	36	32	1	3	102	18	+84	97	Promotion to Divizia B
2	Sticla Arieșul Turda	36	24	1	11	80	31	+49	73	Qualification to promotion play-off
3	Industria Sârmei Câmpia Turzii	36	20	2	14	68	60	+8	62	
4	West Petrom Pecica	36	17	5	14	64	58	+6	56	
5	CFR Cluj	36	16	8	12	61	55	+6	56	
6	Olimpia Gherla	36	16	6	14	53	40	+13	54	
7	Crișul Aleșd	36	16	4	16	63	59	+4	52	
8	Electrica Timișoara	36	16	4	16	67	62	+5	52	
9	Armătura Zalău	36	15	6	15	62	52	+10	51	
10	Phoenix Baia Mare	36	15	4	17	62	54	+8	49	
11	Telecom Arad	36	14	7	15	59	48	+11	49	
12	Minaur Zlatna	36	15	3	18	47	76	−29	48	
13	Someșul Satu Mare	36	15	2	19	53	69	−16	47	
14	CFR Timișoara	36	13	8	15	59	64	−5	47	
15	Minerul Sărmășag	36	13	7	16	41	50	−9	46	
16	Inter Arad	36	12	9	15	53	63	−10	45	
17	Metalurgistul Cugir (R)	36	14	3	19	42	64	−22	45	Relegation to Divizia D
18	Obilici Sânmartinu Sârbesc (R)	36	12	3	21	46	72	−26	39	Relegation to Divizia D
19	Minerul Ștei (R)	36	4	3	29	31	108	−77	15	Relegation to Divizia D
20	Hârtia Prundu Bârgăului (Note: Hârtia Prundu Bârgăului withdrew just before the start of the season.) (D)	0	0	0	0	0	0	0	0	Withdrew

Source: romaniansoccer.ro
Rules for classification: 1) Points; 2) Goal difference; 3) Number of goals scored.
(C) Champions; (D) Disqualified; (P) Promoted; (R) Relegated

== Promotion play-off ==
19 June 1999	Flacăra Horezu	1–1 (a.e.t.) (5–4 p)	Sticla Arieșul Turda	Sibiu
11:00 EEST (UTC+3)	Ursu 63'		Scorojan 68'	Stadium: Municipal

19 June 1999	Juventus Steaua București	3–2	Petrolul Ianca	Plopeni
11:00 EEST (UTC+3)	Gheorghe Pena 3'; Gheorghe Pena 31'; Tudorel Zamfirescu 86'		Marian Berceanu 30'; Ștefan Vrăbioru 57'	Stadium: Metalul

== See also ==
- 1998–99 Divizia A
- 1998–99 Divizia B
- 1998–99 Divizia D
- 1998–99 Cupa României
