= Bojtor =

Bojtor is a surname. Notable people with the surname include:

- János Bojtor (born 1958), Romanian footballer
- László Bojtor (born 1985), Hungarian footballer
