= AS Înfrățirea Oradea =

Romanian football club

Înfrățirea Oradea
- Full name: Asociația Sportivă; Înfrățirea Oradea
- Nicknames: Mașiniștii (The machinists); Roș-negrii (The Red and Blacks)
- Short name: Înfrățirea
- Founded: 1948
- Dissolved: 2000
- Ground: Tineretului
- Capacity: 5,000
- Owner: Înfrățirea Factory
- 2000–01: Divizia D, Bihor County, 16th (withdrew)

Asociația Sportivă Înfrățirea Oradea, commonly known as Înfrățirea Oradea, or simply as Înfrățirea, was a Romanian football club based in Oradea, Bihor County. The club was established in 1948, as the football team of Înfrățirea Factory and during the 1970s and 1980s was a regular presence at the levels of Divizia B and Divizia C.

During these decades, Înfrățirea was considered the second team of Oradea, after FC Bihor Oradea, most of the local players from this period played for both of them during their careers. During the 1990s, Înfrățirea Factory went through several unsuccessful privatization processes, the team changed its name in INCAST Oradea but played mostly in the Divizia D, without much success due to financial problems. Finally, the financial problems took over the team, which was dissolved in 2000, then the factory, which was closed in 2003.

== History ==
=== The turmoil of the first years (1948–1970) ===
In 1947, "Fulger" Locksmith and Metal Works, "Standard" Trolley Factory, "Ivan" Foundry, Roller and Stove Factory, "Gruenwald Brothers" Metal and Tinware Factory they joined together and formed Phoebus Society. In 1948, following nationalization, Phoebus Society, along with several other smaller workshops, were merged into a new enterprise, called Înfrăţirea Oradea, focused on the manufacture of machine tools (milling machines, drilling machines, machining centers). The football team of the factory was established in the same year, under the same name of Înfrățirea Oradea.

In 1950, Înfrățirea Oradea merged with Stăruința Oradea (the team that was absorbed in the process), and the club was renamed as Metalul Oradea. Metalul won Bihor Regional Championship in 1951 and was a top team in the Regional Championship during the 1950s. In 1956 Metalul Oradea was renamed Energia Oradea and was part of the first round of teams that participated in the new Divizia C format, where it was ranked 9th of 13. In 1957, Energia Oradea was renamed once again, in search of one's own identity, this time the name chosen to be that of the legendary team of Stăruința Oradea, team that was absorbed in 1950. The name did not bring the hoped-for luck, the team was relegated at the end of the season after it was ranked only 13th out of 14. After the relegation, the team changed its name back to Înfrățirea Oradea and played at amateur level for the next almost 20 years, with no notable results.

=== A spectacular comeback (1970–1990) ===
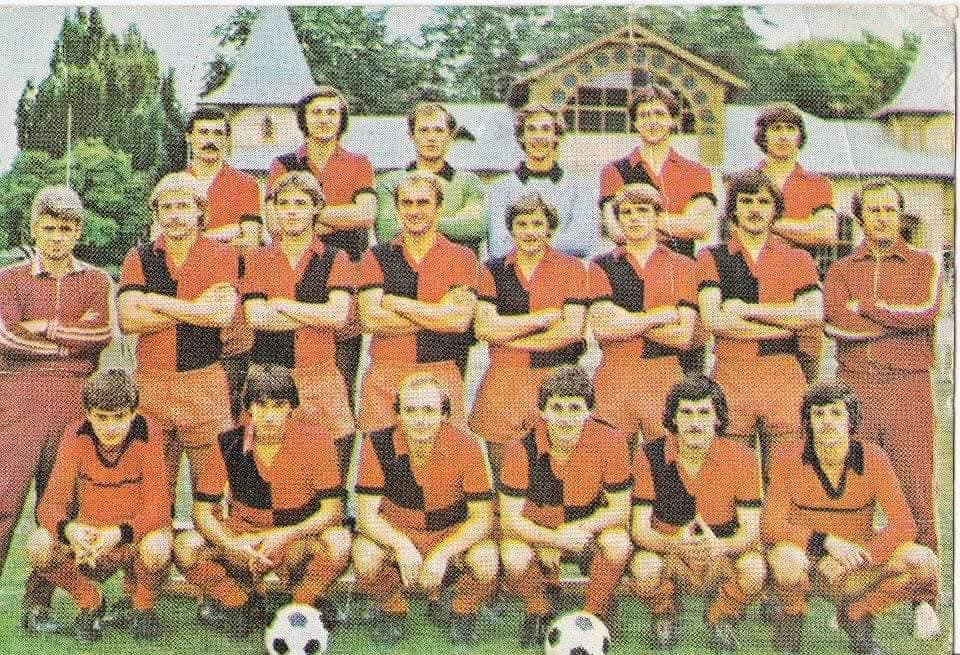
Înfrățirea Oradea (1980–1981)

The 1970s brought many changes in the local football of Oradea, if FC Bihor Oradea remained the most important club of the city, other clubs such as Voința Oradea, Olimpia Oradea, Dinamo Oradea or Alumina Oradea were struggling to survive. In 1975, Olimpia Oradea (former Flamura Roșie Oradea) merged with Dinamo Oradea, the new team was enrolled in the Divizia C under the name of Dinamo M.I.U. Next year, in the summer of 1976, Înfrățirea Oradea absorbed Dinamo M.I.U in another merging process and took its place in the third division, thus making its comeback after 18 years of absence. Înfrățirea made a great first season and was ranked 2nd, missing the promotion to Divizia B in front of Victoria Carei, for a difference of only three points. The red and blacks will not miss their chance next season, finishing at the same distance from Strungul Arad, but now in 1st place, thus ensuring its promotion to Divizia B.

The following 15 years was the best period in the history of the team, with important financial sustain from the factory and regular presences in the second and third tiers. In the first period spent in the Divizia B, between 1978 and 1983, the team of the factory had important results, including a podium finish, and developed a productive local football rivalry with the more successful FC Bihor Oradea. These were the rankings of Înfrățirea in this period: 14th (1978–79), 13th (1979–80), 3rd (1980–81), 6th (1981–82) and 18th (1982–83). It would be worth mentioning that during the 1981–82 Cupa României season, Înfrățirea managed to bring to Oradea the national champion Universitatea Craiova, a match lost at the limit by the machinists, score 0–1.

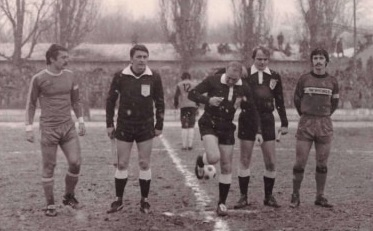
Gh. Dumitrescu (left) and Ciupitu (right), before Înfrățirea vs. Univ. Craiova in 1981.

During these seasons important players wore the red and black shirt, with a special mention for the 1980–81 squad which was ranked 3rd, even in front of FC Bihor, formed by the following players and staff: János Bojtor, Géza Király (goalkeepers) – Dan Mihelea, Ștefan Palfi, Paul Popovici, Gheorghe Farcaș I, Zoltán Vig, Traian Molnar, Ionel Negrea, Vladimir Tămaș, Dănuț Pavel, Tiberiu Gerőcs, Fănică Munteanu, Eugen Dubovan, Zoltán Svarczman, Zsigmond Balázs, Viorel Stoica, Radu Nicoraș, Marius Omuț, Teodor Banfi; Alexandru Jakab (manager) and Ioan Tomeș (assistant coach).

After relegation, the Red and Blacks needed two seasons to return to the second tier, finishing 5th in 1983–84 before winning the series in 1984–85, four points ahead of another Bihor County team, Recolta Salonta. The squad, coached by Viorel Abrudan, included Bojtor, Sebestien, Vida, Fodor, Palfi, David, Vonci, Szűcs, Țigan, Pall, Naghi, Munteanu, Teșean, Găvruța, Vițian, Babo, Bibar, Popovici, Fekete, Heredea, Klausz, Nicoraș, Chidaș, and Omuț. But, this time, the team of the factory failed to last more than one season, relegating back. In the following years the machinists took a downward slope and reached a peak just before the Romanian Revolution, a 3rd place in the 1989–90 season, but with no chances of promotion.

=== The fall of the factory and the team (1990–2000) ===
After the fall of the communist regime, Înfrățirea Factory went through a series of less successful privatizations, like most of the factories in Romania. The team managed to stay at the level of Divizia C until the end of the 1991–92 season, when it relegated to Divizia D, where it remained until its dissolution. In the 1990s, the football team was known under one of its former names, Energia Oradea (1992–1995), then until its dissolution as INCAST Oradea (1995–2000), the name given after the privatization of the factory. These were the rankings of Energia / INCAST during this period: 14th (1994–95), 4th (1995–96), 8th (1996–97), 5th (1997–98), 9th (1998–99) and 7th (1999–2000). The team enrolled in the 2000–01 edition but withdrew before the start of the season, yet it appeared in the rankings with zero on the line.

INCAST Oradea withdrawal was in strong connection with the financial problems of the factory, which was on the verge of bankruptcy. Only three years later, industrial colossus will close its doors permanently. The factory remained decommissioned until the 2010s, when their demolition began, the last buildings were demolished in 2021, thus ending an era.

== Ground ==
Înfrățirea Oradea played its home matches on Tineretului Stadium, in Oradea, Bihor County, the historical stadium of the city, where on 1 June 1902 was held the first football match in Oradea. The stadium has a capacity of 5,000 people on terraces.

== Honours ==
Divizia C

- Winners (2): 1977–78, 1984–85
- Runners-up (1): 1976–77

Bihor Regional Championship

- Winners (1): 1951
- Runners-up (1): 1971–72

=== Other performances ===
- Appearances in Divizia B: 6
- Best finish in Divizia B: 3rd (1980–81)
- Appearances in Divizia C: 12
- Best finish in Cupa României: Fourth Round (2018–19)

== Notable former players ==
- (Romania) János Bojtor
- (Romania) Nicolae Florescu
- (Romania) Nicolae Mureșan
- (Romania) Eugen Nagy
- (Romania) Ion Nițu
- (Romania) Paul Popovici
- (Romania) Gabriel Raksi
- (Romania) Árpád Szűcs
- (Romania) Vladimir Tămaș

== Former managers ==
- (Romania) Francisc Spielmann (1954–1955)
- (Romania) Constantin Popescu (1979–1980)
- (Romania) Viorel Abrudan
- (Romania) Alexandru Jakab
- (Romania) Alexandru Muta
- (Romania) Ioan Tomeș

== Chronology of names ==
Name	Period
Înfrățirea Oradea	1948–1950
Metalul Oradea	1950–1956
Energia Oradea	1956–1957
Stăruința Oradea	1957–1958
Înfrățirea Oradea	1958–1992
Energia Oradea	1992–1995
INCAST Oradea	1995–2000

== League and Cup history ==
Season	Tier	Division	Place	Notes	Cupa României
2000–01	4	Divizia D (BH)	16th	Withdrew	
1999–00	4	Divizia D (BH)	7th		Preliminary Round
1998–99	4	Divizia D (BH)	9th		Preliminary Round
1997–98	4	Divizia D (BH)	5th		Preliminary Round
1996–97	4	Divizia D (BH)	8th		Preliminary Round
1995–96	4	Divizia D (BH)	4th		Preliminary Round
1994–95	4	Divizia D (BH)	14th		Preliminary Round
1993–94	4	Divizia D (BH)	10th		Preliminary Round
1992–93	4	Divizia D (BH)	10th		Preliminary Round
1991–92	3	Divizia C (Seria XI)	12th	Relegated	
1990–91	3	Divizia C (Seria XII)	6th		
1989–90	3	Divizia C (Seria XII)	3rd		
1988–89	3	Divizia C (Seria XII)	11th		

Season	Tier	Division	Place	Notes	Cupa României
1987–88	3	Divizia C (Seria VIII)	9th		Preliminary Round
1986–87	3	Divizia C (Seria IX)	4th		Preliminary Round
1985–86	2	Divizia B (Seria III)	17th	Relegated	Preliminary Round
1984–85	3	Divizia C (Seria IX)	1st (C)	Promoted	Preliminary Round
1983–84	3	Divizia C (Seria IX)	5th		Preliminary Round
1982–83	2	Divizia B (Seria III)	17th	Relegated	Preliminary Round
1981–82	2	Divizia B (Seria III)	6th		First round proper
1980–81	2	Divizia B (Seria III)	3rd		Preliminary Round
1979–80	2	Divizia B (Seria III)	13th		Preliminary Round
1978–79	2	Divizia B (Seria III)	14th		Preliminary Round
1977–78	3	Divizia C (Seria IX)	1st (C)	Promoted	Preliminary Round
1976–77	3	Divizia C (Seria IX)	2nd		Preliminary Round
