= 1998–99 Divizia B =

Divizia B
- Season: 1998–99
- Promoted: Brașov; Extensiv Craiova; Rocar București
- Relegated: Rulmentul Alexandria; Vega Deva; Nitramonia Făgăraș; Baia Mare; Dacia Unirea Brăila; Unirea Dej
- Top goalscorer: Marian Ivan (17 goals)

The 1998–99 Divizia B was the 59th season of the second tier of the Romanian football league system.

The format has been maintained to two series, each of them having 18 teams. At the end of the season, the winners of the series promoted to Divizia A and the last three places from both series relegated to Divizia C. A promotion play-off was played between the runners-up of the series to decide the third team that promoted to Divizia A.

== Team changes ==
=== To Divizia B ===
Promoted from Divizia C

- Laminorul Roman
- Cimentul Fieni
- Rulmentul Alexandria
- Bihor Oradea
- Chimica Târnăveni
- Drobeta-Turnu Severin

Relegated from Divizia A

- Chindia Târgoviște
- Sportul Studențesc București
- Jiul Petroșani

=== From Divizia B ===
Relegated to Divizia C

- Metalul Plopeni
- CFR Cluj
- Dunărea Călărași
- UM Timișoara
- Foresta II Fălticeni
- Gloria Reșița

Promoted to Divizia A

- Astra Ploiești
- Olimpia Satu Mare
- FC Onești

=== Renamed teams ===
Electroputere Craiova was renamed as Extensiv Craiova.

Maramureș Baia Mare was renamed as FC Baia Mare.

== League tables ==
=== Seria I ===
Pos	Team	Pld	W	D	L	GF	GA	GD	Pts	Qualification
1	Brașov (C, P)	34	21	8	5	64	22	+42	71	Promotion to Divizia A
2	Rocar București (O, P)	34	22	3	9	69	35	+34	69	Qualification to promotion play-off
3	Cimentul Fieni	34	17	7	10	53	33	+20	58	
4	Politehnica Iași	34	15	7	12	49	45	+4	52	
5	Laminorul Roman	34	16	4	14	43	33	+10	52	
6	Midia Năvodari	34	14	8	12	53	34	+19	50	
7	Poiana Câmpina	34	14	8	12	42	47	−5	50	
8	Precizia Săcele	34	15	4	15	45	40	+5	49	
9	Metrom Brașov	34	14	6	14	48	37	+11	48	
10	Gloria Buzău	34	15	3	16	40	42	−2	48	
11	Dunărea Galați	34	14	5	15	44	45	−1	47	
12	Chindia Târgoviște	34	14	5	15	43	46	−3	47	
13	Sportul Studențesc București	34	13	8	13	38	33	+5	47	
14	Tractorul Brașov	34	15	2	17	47	54	−7	47	
15	Petrolul Moinești	34	14	5	15	45	41	+4	47	
16	Rulmentul Alexandria (R)	34	13	5	16	39	30	+9	44	Relegation to Divizia C
17	Nitramonia Făgăraș (R)	34	9	6	19	30	62	−32	33	Relegation to Divizia C
18	Dacia Unirea Brăila (R)	34	2	4	28	12	125	−113	10	Relegation to Divizia C

Updated to match(es) played on 30 June 1999. Source: romaniansoccer.ro (in Romanian)
Rules for classification: 1) Points; 2) Head-to-head points; 3) Head-to-head goal difference; 4) Head-to-head goals scored; 5) Head-to-head away goals scored; 6) Goal difference; 7) Goals scored.
(C) Champions; (O) Play-off winners; (P) Promoted; (R) Relegated

=== Seria II ===
Pos	Team	Pld	W	D	L	GF	GA	GD	Pts	Qualification
1	Extensiv Craiova (C, P)	34	22	5	7	83	32	+51	71	Promotion to Divizia A
2	UTA Arad	34	20	6	8	73	41	+32	66	Qualification to promotion play-off
3	ARO Câmpulung	34	18	4	12	64	49	+15	58	
4	Gaz Metan Mediaș	34	16	5	13	58	51	+7	53	
5	Politehnica Timișoara	34	16	4	14	60	41	+19	52	
6	Bihor Oradea	34	15	6	13	43	46	−3	51	
7	ASA Târgu Mureș	34	16	2	16	47	48	−1	50	
8	Chimica Târnăveni	34	14	5	15	39	51	−12	47	
9	Minerul Motru	34	14	4	16	47	55	−8	46	
10	Corvinul Hunedoara	34	14	4	16	52	59	−7	46	
11	Inter Sibiu	34	14	3	17	50	49	+1	45	
12	Drobeta-Turnu Severin	34	13	6	15	48	52	−4	45	
13	Dacia Pitești	34	13	5	16	50	56	−6	44	
14	Apulum Alba Iulia	34	13	4	17	42	55	−13	43	
15	Jiul Petroșani	34	13	4	17	38	55	−17	43	
16	Vega Deva (R)	34	12	5	17	35	66	−31	41	Relegation to Divizia C
17	Baia Mare (R)	34	11	6	17	45	53	−8	39	Relegation to Divizia C
18	Unirea Dej (R)	34	11	4	19	46	61	−15	37	Relegation to Divizia C

Updated to match(es) played on 30 June 1999. Source: romaniansoccer.ro (in Romanian)
Rules for classification: 1) Points; 2) Head-to-head points; 3) Head-to-head goal difference; 4) Head-to-head goals scored; 5) Head-to-head away goals scored; 6) Goal difference; 7) Goals scored.
(C) Champions; (P) Promoted; (R) Relegated

== Promotion play-off ==
The 2nd-placed teams of the Divizia B played a match to decide the third team promoted to Divizia A. The match was played on neutral ground, on the Cetate Stadium in Alba Iulia.

19 June 1999	Rocar București	2–0	UTA Arad	Alba Iulia
14:00 EEST (UTC+3)	Vrăjitoarea 20'; Strelțov 90'	Report		Stadium: Cetate; Attendance: 12,000; Referee: Sorin Corpodean (Alba Iulia)

== Top scorers ==
17 goals

- (Romania) Marian Ivan (FC Brașov)

15 goals

- (Romania) Bogdan Vrăjitoarea (Rocar București)

13 goals

- (Romania) Laurențiu Diniță (Sportul Studențesc)
- (Romania) Adrian State (Dunărea Galați)

10 goals

- (Romania) Cristian Dicu (Midia Năvodari)
- (Romania) Claudiu Drăgan (UTA Arad)

9 goals

- (Romania) Cornel Mihart (ARO Câmpulung)
- (Romania) Gabriel Boștină (Cimentul Fieni)
- (Romania) Marius Păcurar (Corvinul Hunedoara)
- (Romania) Ionuț Savu (Rocar București)

8 goals

- (Romania) Romeo Pădureț (Sportul Studențesc)
- (Romania) Daniel Bona (Precizia Săcele)

7 goals

- (Romania) Marcel Rus (Extensiv Craiova)
- (Romania) Aurelian Dumitru (Sportul Studențesc)
- (Romania) Cristian Albeanu (Bihor Oradea)
- (Romania) Robert Niță (Cimentul Fieni)

== See also ==
- 1998–99 Divizia A
- 1998–99 Divizia C
- 1998–99 Divizia D
