= Ioan Tomeș =

Romanian footballer (1941–2020)

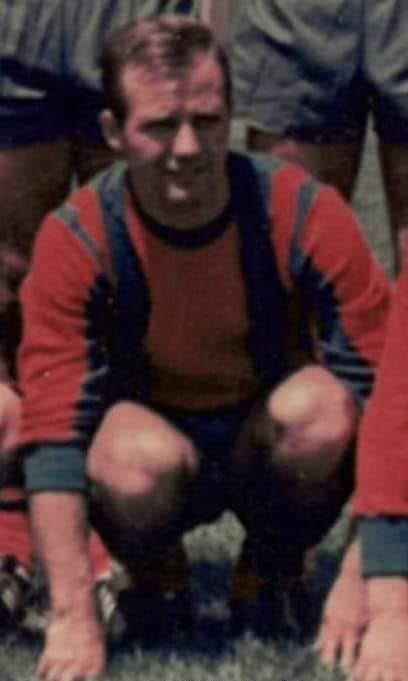
- Tomeș at Crișul in 1967.

Personal information
- Date of birth: 15 June 1941
- Place of birth: Oradea, Romania
- Date of death: 12 November 2020 (aged 79)
- Place of death: Debrecen, Hungary
- Height: 1.75 m (5 ft 9 in)
- Position: Forward

Youth career
- 1951–1958: Rapid Oradea
- 1958–1960: CS Oradea

Senior career*
| Years | Team | Apps | (Gls) |
| 1959–1961 | CS Oradea | 45 | (21) |
| 1961–1963 | Steaua București | 19 | (10) |
| 1963–1965 | UTA Arad | 39 | (3) |
| 1965–1970 | Crișul Oradea | 31 | (4) |
| Total | | 134 | (38) |

Managerial career
- 1970–1971: Crișul Oradea (assistant)
- 1980–1983: Înfrățirea Oradea (assistant)
- 1998–2000: Debrecen (assistant)
- * Club domestic league appearances and goals as of 15 January 2021

Ioan Tomeș (also known as János Tomes; 15 June 1941 – 12 November 2020) was a Romanian professional footballer. He played as a forward for teams such as CS Oradea, Steaua București, UTA Arad or Crișul Oradea and after retirement worked as a football coach at Înfrățirea Oradea during the 1980s. After 1990, he moved to Hungary, where he worked as a coach, especially for Debreceni VSC.

== Honours ==
Steaua București

- Cupa României: 1961–62
