= Marian Ivan =

Romanian footballer

Personal information
- Date of birth: 1 June 1969 (age 57)
- Place of birth: Bragadiru, Romania
- Height: 1.82 m (6 ft 0 in)
- Position: Forward

Youth career
- 1980–1988: Steaua București

Senior career*
Years	Team	Apps	(Gls)
1988–1989	Steaua București	0	(0)
1989–1991	Progresul Brăila	21	(4)
1991	Aris	0	(0)
1991–1994	FC Brașov	91	(37)
1994–1995	Dinamo București	33	(7)
1995	Evagoras Paphos	12	(3)
1996	Panionios	16	(1)
1996	Dinamo București	9	(3)
1997	FC Brașov	15	(2)
1997	Dinamo București	8	(4)
1998	Sportul Studenţesc	13	(3)
1998–2001	FC Brașov	78	(35)
2001–2002	Henan Construction	5	(0)
2002	Foresta Suceava	5	(0)
2003	Oltul Sfântu Gheorghe	10	(8)
2003–2004	FC Ghimbav	24	(11)
Total		340	(118)

International career
1994	Romania	3	(0)
- * Club domestic league appearances and goals

Marian Ivan (born 1 June 1969) is a Romanian former professional footballer who played as a forward.

== International career ==
Romania
Year	Apps	Goals
1994	3	0
Total	3	0

== Honours ==
Progresul Brăila

- Divizia B: 1989–90

FC Brașov

- Divizia B: 1998–99

Oltul Sfântu Gheorghe

- Divizia C: 2002–03

FC Ghimbav

- Divizia C: 2003–04

Individual

- Divizia B top scorer: 1998–99 (17 goals)
