= Vladimir Tămaș =

Romanian footballer

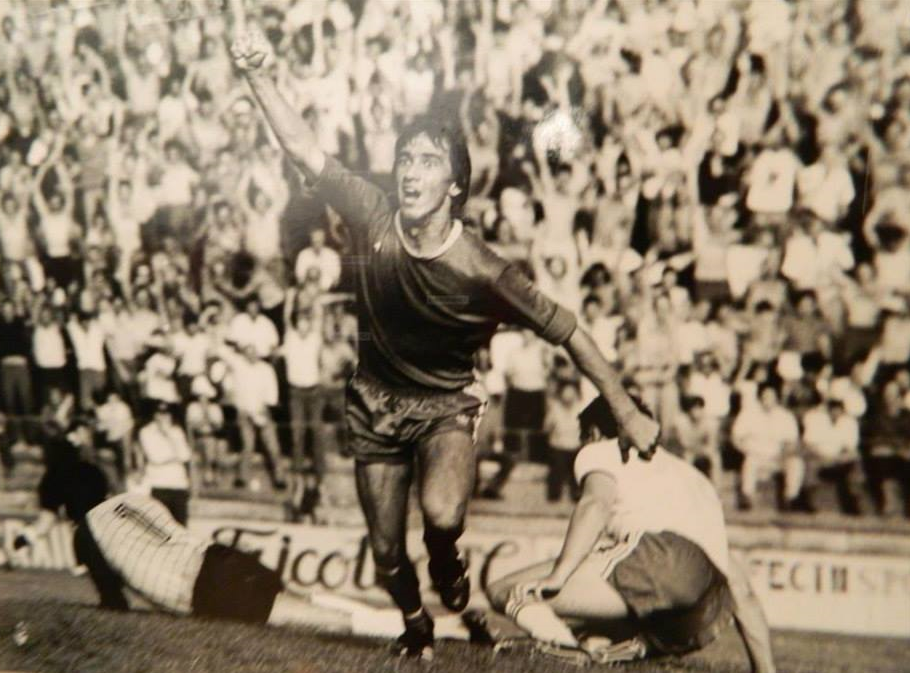
- Tămaș after a goal scored in 1984

Personal information
- Date of birth: 30 October 1961 (age 65)
- Place of birth: Oradea, Romania
- Height: 1.75 m (5 ft 9 in)
- Position: Midfielder

Youth career
- 1971–1978: Înfrățirea Oradea

Senior career*
Years	Team	Apps	(Gls)
1978–1983	Înfrățirea Oradea	51	(1)
1983–1992	Bihor Oradea	240	(21)
Total		291	(22)
- * Club domestic league appearances and goals as of 15:26, 7 January 2025 (UTC)

Vladimir "Vova" Tămaș (born 30 October 1961) is a Romanian former professional footballer who played as a midfielder for Înfrățirea Oradea and FC Bihor Oradea. Tămaș played in 216 Divizia A matches and scored 16 goals for FC Bihor, being the captain of the team in one of its greatest times. After retirement Tămaș was involved in FC Bihor as a sporting director and general manager. He is currently included in the hall of fame of the football club based in Oradea, being considered a legend.

== Honours ==
Bihor Oradea

- Divizia B: 1987–88

Înfrățirea Oradea

- Divizia C: 1977–78
