= 1999–2000 Divizia C =

Third tier Romanian football league

Divizia C
- Season: 1999–2000

The 1999–2000 Divizia C was the 44th season of Liga III, the third tier of the Romanian football league system.

== Team changes ==
=== To Divizia C ===
Relegated from Divizia B

- Rulmentul Alexandria
- Nitramonia Făgăraș
- Dacia Unirea Brăila
- Vega Deva
- Baia Mare
- Unirea Dej

Promoted from Divizia D

- ~~Șomuzul Preutești~~
- Aerostar Bacău
- CFR Citadin Iași
- ~~Ozana Târgu Neamț~~
- Sportul Municipal Vaslui
- ASA Rapid Miercurea Ciuc
- Siretul Bucecea
- Tricotex Panciu
- Șantierul Naval Galați
- Portul Constanța
- Conpet Ploiești
- Unirea Mânăstirea
- Agricultorul Urziceni
- Șantierul Naval Tulcea
- Hidroconcas Buzău
- Dunacor Brăila
- ~~IOB Balș~~
- Turistul Pantelimon
- Dinamo Segarcea
- Conired PAS Pucioasa
- Severnav Drobeta-Turnu Severin
- Rova Roșiori
- Aversa București
- ~~Petrolul Roata de Jos~~
- Telecom Timișoara
- Parângul Lonea
- Cuprirom Abrud
- Caromet Caransebeș
- Universitatea Arad
- Sfântu Gheorghe
- Oltchim Râmnicu Vâlcea
- Curtea de Argeș
- Gilortul Târgu Cărbunești
- Rapid Brașov
- CSU Mecanica Sibiu
- Oașul Negrești-Oaș
- Laminorul Beclean
- Minerul Ocna Dej
- Progresul Șomcuta Mare
- Olimpia Salonta
- Silvania Cehu Silvaniei
- Avântul Silva Reghin

=== From Divizia C ===
Promoted to Divizia B

- Diplomatic Focșani
- Callatis Mangalia
- Electro Bere Craiova
- UM Timișoara
- Juventus București
- ~~Flacăra Horezu~~

Relegated to Divizia D

- ~~Dorna Vatra Dornei~~
- Fortyogó Târgu Secuiesc
- Bucovina Rădăuți
- Constructorul Reghin
- Navol Oltenița
- Petrolistul Boldești
- Acumulatorul București
- Rafinăria Sterom Câmpina
- ~~Minerul Mătăsari~~
- ~~Flacăra Moreni~~
- Progresul Caracal
- Record Mediaș
- ~~Metalurgistul Cugir~~
- Obilici Sânmartinu Sârbesc
- Minerul Ștei
- Hârtia Prundu Bârgăului

=== Renamed teams ===
Electro Apemin Borsec was renamed as Apemin Borsec.

Electro-Turris Turnu Măgurele was renamed as Turris Turnu Măgurele.

ASA Rapid Miercurea Ciuc was renamed as Rapid Miercurea Ciuc.

Parângul Lonea was renamed as Inter Petrila.

CSU Mecanica Sibiu was renamed as Universitatea Sibiu.

Conired PAS Pucioasa was renamed as Conired Pucioasa.

Vega Deva was renamed as Cetate Deva.

Sticla Arieșul Turda was renamed as Arieșul Turda.

=== Other changes ===
Dorna Vatra Dornei took the place of Șomuzul Preutești. Subsequently was renamed as Pro Mobila Vatra Dornei.

Ozana Târgu Neamț ceded its place to newly formed Termoutilaj Piatra Neamț.

Unirea Botoșani merged with Fortus Iași, the first one being absorbed by the second one.

Jandarmii Dorobanțu ceded its place to Hondor Agigea.

Petrolul Roata de Jos ceded its place to Atletic București.

IOB Balș ceded its place to Flacăra Moreni.

Dinamo Segarcea merged with Internațional Calafat. The new entity was named as Dinamo Calafat.

Minerul Mătăsari, and Metalurgistul Cugir were spared from relegation.

Flacăra Horezu ceded its Divizia B place to newly formed Flacăra Râmnicu Vâlcea.

Minerul Berbești ceded its place to Flacăra Horezu, which was renamed as Minerul Horezu.

== League tables ==
=== Seria I ===
Pos	Team	Pld	W	D	L	GF	GA	GD	Pts	Qualification or relegation
1	Apemin Borsec (C, P)	30	22	6	2	78	17	+61	72	Promotion to Divizia B
2	Pro Mobila Vatra Dornei	30	18	5	7	63	23	+40	59	
3	Aerostar Bacău	30	17	4	9	45	30	+15	55	
4	Termoutilaj Piatra Neamț	30	15	2	13	47	51	−4	47	
5	Rafinăria Dărmănești	30	13	5	12	62	53	+9	44	
6	Rulmentul Bârlad	30	13	4	13	56	50	+6	43	
7	Cimentul Bicaz	30	12	7	11	56	50	+6	43	
8	Fortus Iași	30	13	3	14	43	45	−2	42	
9	CFR Pașcani	30	13	3	14	42	48	−6	42	
10	Vrancart Adjud	30	12	5	13	44	48	−4	41	
11	Sportul Municipal Vaslui	30	11	4	15	37	44	−7	37	
12	Budvar Odorheiu Secuiesc	30	11	4	15	39	49	−10	37	
13	CFR Citadin Iași	29	11	4	14	37	53	−16	37	
14	Minerul 92 Comănești	30	9	5	16	31	55	−24	32	
15	Rapid Miercurea Ciuc	29	8	4	17	34	51	−17	28	
16	Siretul Bucecea (R)	28	5	5	18	28	75	−47	20	Relegation to Divizia D
17	Șantierul Naval Galați (Note: Șantierul Naval Galați and Tricotex Panciu withdrew in the first part of the season and all their results were canceled.) (D)	0	0	0	0	0	0	0	0	Withdrew
18	Tricotex Panciu (D)	0	0	0	0	0	0	0	0	Withdrew

Source: romaniansoccer.ro
Rules for classification: 1) Points; 2) Goal difference; 3) Number of goals scored.
(C) Champions; (D) Disqualified; (P) Promoted; (R) Relegated

=== Seria II ===
Pos	Team	Pld	W	D	L	GF	GA	GD	Pts	Qualification or relegation
1	Hondor Agigea (C, P)	32	20	5	7	70	44	+26	65	Promotion to Divizia B
2	Portul Constanța	32	16	8	8	63	34	+29	56	
3	Metalul Filipeștii de Pădure	32	13	9	10	70	37	+33	48	
4	Cimentul Medgidia	32	14	5	13	40	40	0	47	
5	Petrolul Ianca	32	14	5	13	48	56	−8	47	
6	Chimia Brazi	32	13	7	12	38	29	+9	46	
7	Dunărea Călărași	32	14	3	15	55	58	−3	45	
8	Metalul Plopeni	32	14	3	15	44	61	−17	45	
9	Conpet Ploiești	32	13	5	14	51	46	+5	44	
10	Dacia Unirea Brăila	32	14	2	16	46	46	0	44	
11	Petrolul Berca	32	13	5	14	38	39	−1	44	
12	Unirea Mânăstirea	32	12	8	12	47	52	−5	44	
13	Agricultorul Urziceni	32	14	2	16	54	65	−11	44	
14	Unirea Slobozia	32	13	4	15	41	44	−3	43	
15	Șantierul Naval Tulcea	32	13	4	15	49	56	−7	43	
16	Acvaterm Râmnicu Sărat (R)	32	12	6	14	31	37	−6	42	Relegation to Divizia D
17	Hidroconcas Buzău (R)	32	7	5	20	24	65	−41	26	Relegation to Divizia D
18	Dunacor Brăila (Note: Dunacor Brăila withdrew in the first part of the season and all its results were canceled.) (D)	0	0	0	0	0	0	0	0	Withdrew

Source: romaniansoccer.ro
Rules for classification: 1) Points; 2) Goal difference; 3) Number of goals scored.
(C) Champions; (D) Disqualified; (P) Promoted; (R) Relegated

=== Seria III ===
Pos	Team	Pld	W	D	L	GF	GA	GD	Pts	Qualification or relegation
1	Fulgerul Bragadiru (C, P)	34	28	3	3	95	26	+69	87	Promotion to Divizia B
2	Electromagnetica București	34	24	5	5	74	27	+47	77	
3	Inter Gaz București	34	17	4	13	73	36	+37	55	
4	Flacăra Moreni	34	16	6	12	55	41	+14	54	
5	Faur București	34	17	2	15	51	45	+6	53	
6	Turris Turnu Măgurele	34	16	4	14	56	42	+14	52	
7	Inter Dunărea Giurgiu	34	16	3	15	66	49	+17	51	
8	Turistul Pantelimon	34	15	4	15	45	44	+1	49	
9	Dinamo Calafat	34	14	7	13	47	51	−4	49	
10	Conired Pucioasa	34	15	3	16	51	46	+5	48	
11	Rova Roșiori	34	14	5	15	50	53	−3	47	
12	Severnav Drobeta-Turnu Severin	34	15	2	17	52	64	−12	47	
13	Petrolul Videle	34	14	5	15	49	61	−12	47	
14	Rulmentul Alexandria	34	13	7	14	44	40	+4	46	
15	Aversa București	34	13	5	16	43	45	−2	44	
16	Aluminiu Slatina (R)	34	9	3	22	24	78	−54	30	Relegation to Divizia D
17	Atletic București (Note: Atletic București withdrew after 26 rounds and lost all remaining matches with 0–3.) (R)	34	5	9	20	21	66	−45	24	Relegation to Divizia D
18	Constructorul Craiova (R)	34	4	5	25	19	99	−80	17	Relegation to Divizia D

Source: romaniansoccer.ro
Rules for classification: 1) Points; 2) Goal difference; 3) Number of goals scored.
(C) Champions; (P) Promoted; (R) Relegated

=== Seria IV ===
Pos	Team	Pld	W	D	L	GF	GA	GD	Pts	Qualification or relegation
1	Cetate Deva (C, P)	34	22	3	9	73	35	+38	69	Promotion to Divizia B
2	Minerul Certej	34	19	2	13	61	47	+14	59	
3	Telecom Timișoara	34	17	4	13	45	32	+13	55	
4	Minerul Lupeni	34	17	3	14	53	35	+18	54	
5	Minaur Zlatna	34	16	4	14	57	50	+7	52	
6	West Petrom Pecica	34	16	3	15	45	39	+6	51	
7	Gloria Reșița	34	16	3	15	36	30	+6	51	
8	Inter Petrila	34	15	6	13	46	44	+2	51	
9	Minerul Uricani	34	16	3	15	49	55	−6	51	
10	Aurul Brad	34	14	8	12	44	39	+5	50	
11	Telecom Arad	34	15	5	14	52	48	+4	50	
12	Cuprirom Abrud	34	15	5	14	50	48	+2	50	
13	Electrica Timișoara	34	16	2	16	54	55	−1	50	
14	Metalurgistul Cugir	34	15	4	15	45	46	−1	49	
15	Caromet Caransebeș	34	15	3	16	43	48	−5	48	
16	Universitatea Arad (R)	34	14	5	15	38	46	−8	47	Relegation to Divizia D
17	CFR Timișoara (R)	34	12	3	19	36	63	−27	39	Relegation to Divizia D
18	Inter Arad (Note: Inter Arad withdrew after the first part of the season and lost all remaining matches with 0–3.) (R)	34	2	2	30	23	90	−67	8	Relegation to Divizia D

Source: romaniansoccer.ro
Rules for classification: 1) Points; 2) Goal difference; 3) Number of goals scored.
(C) Champions; (P) Promoted; (R) Relegated

=== Seria V ===
Pos	Team	Pld	W	D	L	GF	GA	GD	Pts	Qualification or relegation
1	Pandurii Târgu Jiu (C, P)	34	27	1	6	84	32	+52	82	Promotion to Divizia B
2	Șoimii Sibiu	34	25	3	6	81	33	+48	78	
3	Viromet Victoria	34	18	3	13	62	41	+21	57	
4	Textila Prejmer	34	15	4	15	39	44	−5	49	
5	Sfântu Gheorghe	33	14	6	13	57	46	+11	48	
6	Oltchim Râmnicu Vâlcea	34	14	6	14	51	46	+5	48	
7	Petrolul Țicleni	34	15	3	16	56	62	−6	48	
8	Curtea de Argeș	34	13	8	13	45	44	+1	47	
9	Petrolul Stoina	34	13	7	14	52	54	−2	46	
10	Romradiatoare Brașov	34	13	6	15	48	48	0	45	
11	Minerul Horezu	34	13	6	15	38	41	−3	45	
12	Petrolul Unirea Drăgășani	34	14	3	17	48	63	−15	45	
13	Nitramonia Făgăraș	34	13	5	16	46	67	−21	44	
14	Minerul Mătăsari	33	15	1	17	50	46	+4	43 (Note: Minerul Mătăsari deducted 3 points.)	
15	Forestierul Stâlpeni	34	14	1	19	44	74	−30	43	
16	Gilortul Târgu Cărbunești (R)	34	12	4	18	36	39	−3	40	Relegation to Divizia D
17	Rapid Brașov (R)	34	10	7	17	28	44	−16	37	Relegation to Divizia D
18	Universitatea Sibiu (R)	34	6	6	22	24	71	−47	24	Relegation to Divizia D

Source: romaniansoccer.ro
Rules for classification: 1) Points; 2) Goal difference; 3) Number of goals scored.
(C) Champions; (P) Promoted; (R) Relegated

=== Seria VI ===
Pos	Team	Pld	W	D	L	GF	GA	GD	Pts	Qualification or relegation
1	Baia Mare (C, P)	30	22	6	2	80	23	+57	72	Promotion to Divizia B
2	Olimpia Gherla	30	21	3	6	71	25	+46	66	
3	Industria Sârmei Câmpia Turzii	30	17	3	10	70	52	+18	54	
4	Oașul Negrești-Oaș	30	15	4	11	55	51	+4	49	
5	Someșul Satu Mare	30	14	1	15	35	47	−12	43	
6	Laminorul Beclean	30	13	3	14	43	50	−7	42	
7	Arieșul Turda	30	13	2	15	39	41	−2	41	
8	Phoenix Baia Mare	30	12	4	14	44	55	−11	40	
9	Crișul Aleșd	30	12	3	15	53	47	+6	39	
10	CFR Cluj	30	11	6	13	53	49	+4	39	
11	Minerul Ocna Dej	30	12	3	15	41	49	−8	39	
12	Progresul Șomcuta Mare	30	12	3	15	51	65	−14	39	
13	Minerul Sărmășag	30	11	5	14	41	43	−2	38	
14	Unirea Dej	30	12	2	16	40	44	−4	38	
15	Armătura Zalău	30	11	2	17	40	60	−20	35	
16	Olimpia Salonta (R)	30	7	0	23	39	94	−55	21	Relegation to Divizia D
17	Silvania Cehu Silvaniei (Note: Silvania Cehu Silvaniei and Avântul Silva Reghin withdrew in the first part of the season and all their results were canceled.) (D)	0	0	0	0	0	0	0	0	Withdrew
18	Avântul Silva Reghin (D)	0	0	0	0	0	0	0	0	Withdrew

Source: romaniansoccer.ro
Rules for classification: 1) Points; 2) Goal difference; 3) Number of goals scored.
(C) Champions; (D) Disqualified; (P) Promoted; (R) Relegated

== See also ==
- 1999–2000 Divizia A
- 1999–2000 Divizia B
- 1999–2000 Divizia D
- 1999–2000 Cupa României
