= 1999–2000 Divizia B =

Romanian football league season

Divizia B
- Season: 1999–2000
- Promoted: Foresta Suceava; Gaz Metan Mediaș
- Relegated: Dacia Pitești; Petrolul Moinești; Dunărea Galați; Chimica Târnăveni; Chindia Târgoviște; Universitatea Cluj; Gloria Buzău; Minerul Motru
- Top goalscorer: Mihai Baicu (26 goals)

The 1999–2000 Divizia B was the 60th season of the second tier of the Romanian football league system.

The format has been maintained to two series, each of them having 18 teams. At the end of the season, the winners of the series promoted to Divizia A and the last four places from both series relegated to Divizia C.

== Team changes ==
=== To Divizia B ===
Promoted from Divizia C

- Diplomatic Focșani
- Callatis Mangalia
- Electro-Bere Craiova
- UM Timișoara
- Juventus București
- Flacăra Râmnicu Vâlcea

Relegated from Divizia A

- Foresta Suceava
- Universitatea Cluj
- Olimpia Satu Mare

=== From Divizia B ===
Relegated to Divizia C

- Rulmentul Alexandria
- Vega Deva
- Nitramonia Făgăraș
- Baia Mare
- Dacia Unirea Brăila
- Unirea Dej

Promoted to Divizia A

- Brașov
- Extensiv Craiova
- Rocar București

== League tables ==
=== Seria I ===
Pos	Team	Pld	W	D	L	GF	GA	GD	Pts	Qualification
1	Foresta Suceava (C, P)	34	24	5	5	76	28	+48	77	Promotion to Divizia A
2	Midia Năvodari	34	20	6	8	64	28	+36	66	
3	Sportul Studențesc București	34	17	8	9	59	35	+24	59	
4	Dacia Pitești (Note: Dacia Pitești withdrew from the championship at the end of the season and left for free its place to Politehnica Timișoara, team that initially relegated.) (R)	34	16	6	12	53	47	+6	54	Relegation to Divizia C
5	Tractorul Brașov	34	16	4	14	44	41	+3	52	
6	Metrom Brașov	34	15	7	12	38	32	+6	52	
7	Callatis Mangalia	34	16	4	14	41	41	0	52	
8	Laminorul Roman	34	16	4	14	60	48	+12	52	
9	Politehnica Iași	34	16	2	16	49	45	+4	50	
10	Poiana Câmpina	34	15	4	15	51	44	+7	49	
11	Cimentul Fieni	34	14	7	13	34	37	−3	49	
12	Juventus București	34	13	9	12	45	39	+6	48	
13	Diplomatic Focșani	34	13	8	13	37	37	0	47	
14	Precizia Săcele	34	12	11	11	38	34	+4	47	
15	Petrolul Moinești (R)	34	13	6	15	30	40	−10	45	Relegation to Divizia C
16	Dunărea Galați (R)	34	11	4	19	31	63	−32	37	Relegation to Divizia C
17	Chindia Târgoviște (R)	34	4	4	26	23	83	−60	16	Relegation to Divizia C
18	Gloria Buzău (R)	34	3	5	26	21	72	−51	14	Relegation to Divizia C

Updated to match(es) played on 30 June 2000. Source: romaniansoccer.ro (in Romanian)
Rules for classification: 1) Points; 2) Head-to-head points; 3) Head-to-head goal difference; 4) Head-to-head goals scored; 5) Head-to-head away goals scored; 6) Goal difference; 7) Goals scored.
(C) Champions; (P) Promoted; (R) Relegated

=== Seria II ===
Pos	Team	Pld	W	D	L	GF	GA	GD	Pts	Qualification
1	Gaz Metan Mediaș (C, P)	34	21	6	7	53	22	+31	69	Promotion to Divizia A
2	ARO Câmpulung	34	18	4	12	49	35	+14	58	
3	Corvinul Hunedoara	34	16	6	12	51	33	+18	54	
4	Jiul Petroșani	34	16	5	13	41	38	+3	53	
5	Olimpia Satu Mare	34	15	8	11	54	32	+22	53	
6	UTA Arad	34	16	4	14	49	39	+10	52	
7	Apulum Alba Iulia	34	15	7	12	50	40	+10	52	
8	UM Timișoara	34	13	10	11	61	45	+16	49	
9	Inter Sibiu	34	14	6	14	39	43	−4	48	
10	Flacăra Râmnicu Vâlcea	34	13	9	12	45	41	+4	48	
11	Drobeta-Turnu Severin	34	17	3	14	49	61	−12	48 (Note: Drobeta-Turnu Severin were deducted 6 points and lost 0-3 both matches against Chimica Târnăveni, after charges of match fixing.)	
12	Electro-Bere Craiova	34	15	3	16	48	53	−5	48	
13	ASA Târgu Mureș	34	13	7	14	45	38	+7	46	
14	Bihor Oradea	34	12	10	12	34	51	−17	46	
15	Politehnica Timișoara (Note: Politehnica Timișoara was spared from relegation after Dacia Pitești withdrew and left its place for free to Politehnica.)	34	12	6	16	50	54	−4	42	Spared from relegation
16	Chimica Târnăveni (Note: Chimica Târnăveni lost 0-3 both matches against FC Drobeta-Turnu Severin, after charges of match fixing.) (R)	34	12	5	17	36	51	−15	41	Relegation to Divizia C
17	Universitatea Cluj (R)	34	6	6	22	30	76	−46	24	Relegation to Divizia C
18	Minerul Motru (R)	34	6	5	23	28	66	−38	23	Relegation to Divizia C

Updated to match(es) played on 30 June 2000. Source: romaniansoccer.ro (in Romanian)
Rules for classification: 1) Points; 2) Head-to-head points; 3) Head-to-head goal difference; 4) Head-to-head goals scored; 5) Head-to-head away goals scored; 6) Goal difference; 7) Goals scored.
(C) Champions; (P) Promoted; (R) Relegated

== Top scorers ==
26 goals

- (Romania) Mihai Baicu (Foresta Suceava)

14 goals

- (Romania) Nicolae Dică (Dacia Pitești)

12 goals

- (Romania) Laurențiu Diniță (Sportul Studențesc)
- (Romania) Marius Păcurar (Foresta Suceava)
- (Romania) Adrian Dulcea (Olimpia Satu Mare)
- (Romania) Horațiu Cioloboc (ASA Târgu Mureș)

9 goals

- (Romania) Ionuț Badea (Dacia Pitești)
- (Romania) Gigi Gorga (Metrom Brașov)
- (Romania) Claudiu Boaru (Gaz Metan Mediaș)
- (Romania) Tihamer Török (Precizia Săcele)

8 goals

- (Romania) Sorin Bucuroaia (ARO Câmpulung)
- (Romania) Sorin Oncică (Tractorul Brașov)

== See also ==
- 1999–2000 Divizia A
- 1999–2000 Divizia D
