= ICIM Stadium =

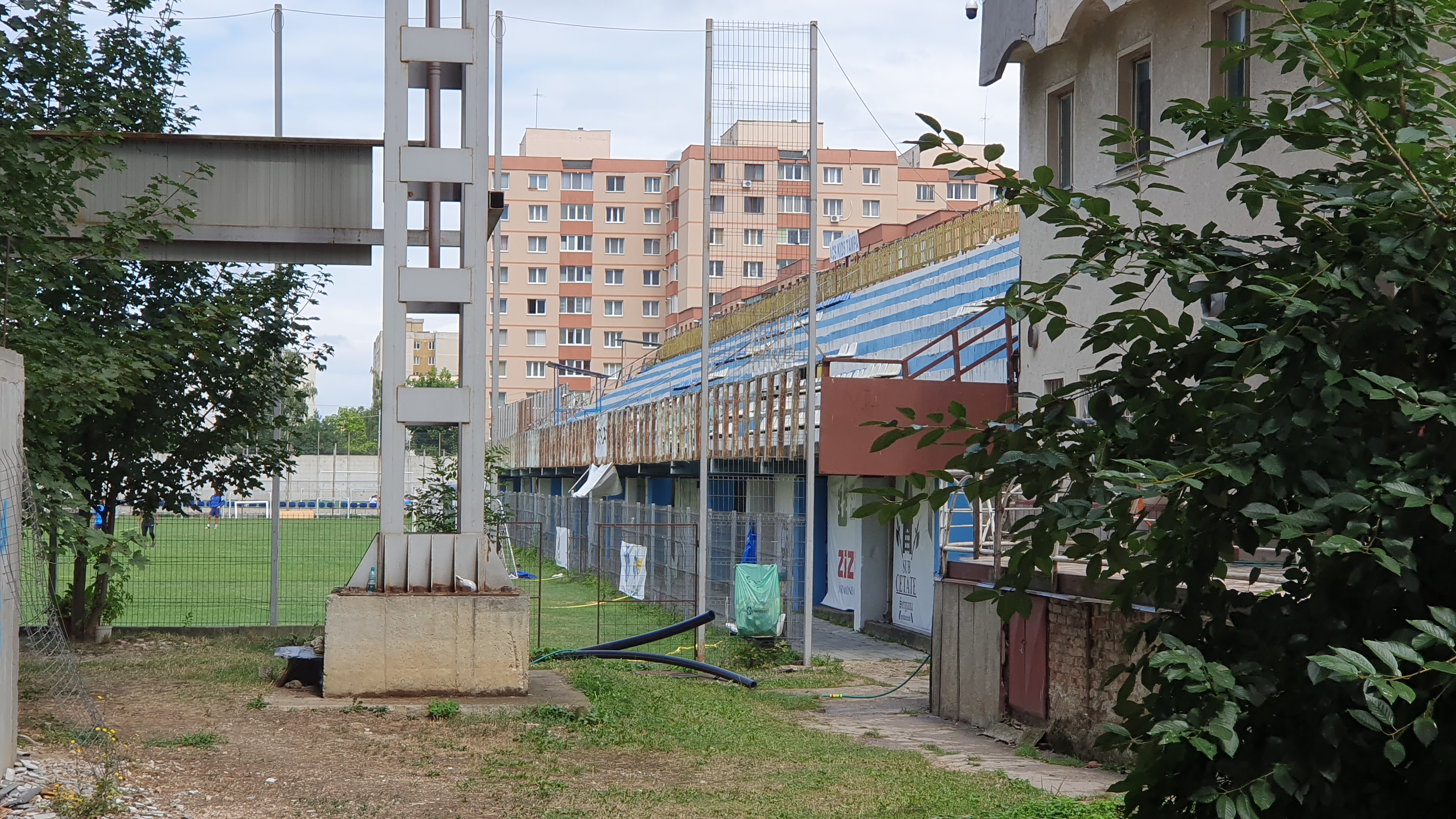
- Interactive map of ICIM Stadium
- Address: Str. Cocorului 10
- Location: Brașov, Romania
- Coordinates: 45°38′09.7″N 25°37′49.6″E
- Owner: Municipality of Brașov
- Operator: Kids Tâmpa Brașov
- Capacity: 3,000 (0 seated)
- Surface: Grass

Construction
- Opened: 1970s
- Renovated: 2008 (failed)

Tenants
- ICIM Brașov (1970–2003); Various (2003–2020); Kids Tâmpa Brașov (2020–present)

ICIM Stadium is a multi-use stadium in Brașov, Romania. It is used mostly for football matches and is the home ground of Kids Tâmpa Brașov. In the past, the stadium was the home ground of ICIM Brașov the football team of Brașov Industrial Construction and Assembly Company (ICIM). ICIM played for almost 30 years at the level of the second division.

The football team was disbanded in the early 2000s and since then the stadium entered a process of degradation, then combined with an unsuccessful attempt at renovation, in the late 2000s. The current capacity of the stadium is now of 3,000 people, reduced from 10,000 people.

== Gallery ==
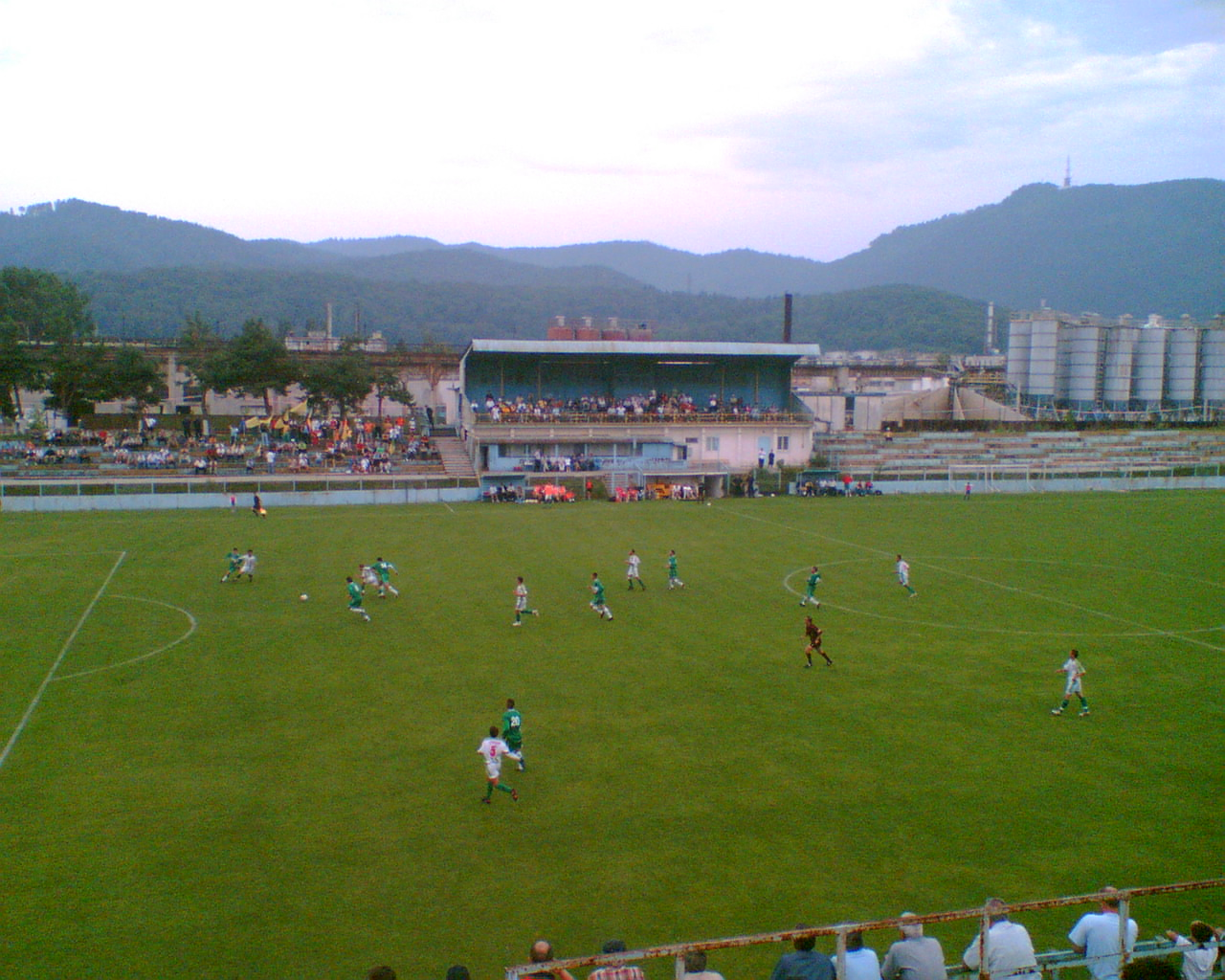
Stadium panorama in 2007.
