= 1998–99 Divizia D =

57th season of the Liga IV, the fourth tier of the Romanian football league

Liga IV
- Season: 1998–99

The 1998–99 Divizia D was the 57th season of the Liga IV, the fourth tier of the Romanian football league system. The champions of each county association promoted to Divizia C without promotion play-off.

== County leagues ==
- Alba (AB)
- Arad (AR)
- Argeș (AG)
- Bacău (BC)
- Bihor (BH)
- Bistrița-Năsăud (BN)
- Botoșani (BT)
- Brașov (BV)
- Brăila (BR)
- Bucharest (B)
- Buzău (BZ)
- Caraș-Severin (CS)
- Călărași (CL)
- Cluj (CJ)
- Constanța (CT)
- Covasna (CV)
- Dâmbovița (DB)
- Dolj (DJ)
- Galați (GL)
- Giurgiu (GR)
- Gorj (GJ)
- Harghita (HR)
- Hunedoara (HD)
- Ialomița (IL)
- Iași (IS)
- Ilfov (IF)
- Maramureș (MM)
- Mehedinți (MH)
- Mureș (MS)
- Neamț (NT)
- Olt (OT)
- Prahova (PH)
- Satu Mare (SM)
- Sălaj (SJ)
- Sibiu (SB)
- Suceava (SV)
- Teleorman (TR)
- Timiș (TM)
- Tulcea (TL)
- Vaslui (VS)
- Vâlcea (VL)
- Vrancea (VN)

== Leagues standings ==
=== Bihor County ===
Pos	Team	Pld	W	D	L	GF	GA	GD	Pts	Promotion or relegation
1	Olimpia Salonta (C, P)	30	24	5	1	98	22	+76	77	Promotion to Divizia C
2	Viitorul Oradea	30	21	4	5	84	26	+58	67	
3	Romtrans Oradea	30	16	10	4	56	24	+32	58	
4	Oțelul Ștei	30	17	1	12	69	56	+13	52	
5	Victoria Avram Iancu	30	16	3	11	68	41	+27	51	
6	Petrolul Suplac	30	16	2	12	73	48	+25	50	
7	Bihor Oradea II	30	14	5	11	64	44	+20	47	
8	Stăruința Sârbi	30	12	5	13	42	53	−11	41	
9	INCAST Oradea	30	10	7	13	47	60	−13	37	
10	Arovit Valea lui Mihai	30	10	6	14	54	61	−7	36	
11	Minerul Șuncuiuș	30	10	5	15	69	75	−6	35	
12	Blănuri Oradea	30	10	3	17	50	57	−7	33	
13	Minerul Vadu Crișului	30	10	3	17	45	104	−59	33	
14	Bihorul Beiuș	30	9	4	17	41	68	−27	31	
15	Biharea Vașcău	30	8	0	22	37	84	−47	24	
16	Minerul Voivozi (R)	30	4	3	23	47	120	−73	15	Relegation to Bihor County Championship

Rules for classification: 1) Points; 2) Goal difference; 3) Number of goals scored.
(C) Champions; (P) Promoted; (R) Relegated

=== Caraș-Severin County ===
Pos	Team	Pld	W	D	L	GF	GA	GD	Pts	Promotion or relegation
1	Caromet Caransebeș (C, P)	32	24	6	2	98	18	+80	78	Promotion to Divizia C
2	Arsenal Reșița	32	20	9	3	87	20	+67	69	
3	Metalul Bocșa	32	20	6	6	83	30	+53	66	
4	CFR Caransebeș	32	20	4	8	100	49	+51	64	
5	Minerul Moldova Nouă	32	19	6	7	75	27	+48	63	
6	Muncitorul Reșița	32	20	4	8	95	37	+58	58 (Note: Muncitorul Reșița deducted 6 points.)	
7	Metalul Oțelu Roșu	32	15	10	7	57	28	+29	55	
8	Mundus Caransebeș	32	11	4	17	41	62	−21	37	
9	Dunărea Moldova Nouă	32	10	5	17	52	74	−22	35	
10	Minerul Anina	32	9	7	16	44	67	−23	34	
11	Oravița	32	7	11	14	42	59	−17	32	
12	Nera Bozovici	32	9	4	19	34	83	−49	31	
13	Bistra Glimboca	32	9	4	19	49	99	−50	31	
14	Minerul Cozla	32	8	5	19	42	114	−72	29	
15	Forest Olimp Zăvoi	32	8	4	20	30	77	−47	28	
16	Metalul Topleț (Note: Metalul Topleț was excluded after 30 rounds and lost all remaining matches with 0–3.) (R)	32	7	6	19	25	62	−37	27	Relegation to Caraș-Severin County Championship
17	Bocșa (R)	32	6	5	21	58	105	−47	23	Relegation to Caraș-Severin County Championship
18	Inter Greoni (Note: Inter Greoni was excluded after 9 rounds and all its results were canceled.) (D)	0	0	0	0	0	0	0	0	Excluded

Rules for classification: 1) Points; 2) Goal difference; 3) Number of goals scored.
(C) Champions; (D) Disqualified; (P) Promoted; (R) Relegated

=== Covasna County ===
Pos	Team	Pld	W	D	L	GF	GA	GD	Pts	Promotion or relegation
1	Sfântu Gheorghe (C, P)	30	27	2	1	180	12	+168	83	Promotion to Divizia C
2	Avântul Catalina	30	18	5	7	78	38	+40	59	
3	Perkő Sânzieni	30	15	5	10	60	39	+21	50	
4	Minerul Baraolt	30	15	2	13	67	48	+19	47	
5	ICB Malnaș	30	14	6	10	57	69	−12	48	
6	Fortyogó Târgu Secuiesc II	30	14	4	12	47	50	−3	46	
7	Stăruința Bodoc	30	14	3	13	56	51	+5	45	
8	Victoria Ozun	30	14	2	14	49	69	−20	44	
9	IAS Câmpu Frumos	30	13	4	13	56	51	+5	43	
10	Nemere Ghelința	30	12	6	12	57	63	−6	42	
11	Stăruința Cernat	30	12	4	14	59	55	+4	40	
12	Harghita Aita Mare	30	12	3	15	47	65	−18	39	
13	Carpați Covasna	30	10	6	14	39	62	−23	36	
14	ICB Bixad	30	10	3	17	27	75	−48	33	
15	Târgu Secuiesc	30	9	2	19	32	87	−55	29	
16	Bradul Zagon (R)	30	2	3	25	16	107	−91	9	Relegation to Covasna County Championship

Rules for classification: 1) Points; 2) Goal difference; 3) Number of goals scored.
(C) Champions; (P) Promoted; (R) Relegated

=== Dolj County ===
Pos	Team	Pld	W	D	L	GF	GA	GD	Pts	Promotion or relegation
1	Dinamo Segarcea (C, P)	34	27	2	5	107	39	+68	83	Promotion to Divizia C
2	Morărit-Panificație Craiova	34	24	4	6	102	32	+70	76	
3	Dunărea Calafat	34	22	6	6	96	33	+63	72	
4	Autobuzul Craiova	34	20	3	11	71	57	+14	63	
5	Unirea Leamna	34	19	5	10	71	50	+21	62	
6	Armata Craiova	34	18	6	10	75	44	+31	60	
7	Internațional Calafat	34	16	7	11	58	36	+22	55	
8	Gaz Metan Ghercești	34	16	3	15	82	52	+30	51	
9	CFR Craiova	34	13	9	12	52	42	+10	48	
10	Tractorul Craiova	34	12	7	15	60	55	+5	43	
11	PRO GPS Segarcea	34	11	8	15	60	73	−13	41	
12	Chimia Craiova	34	11	6	17	50	71	−21	39	
13	Recolta Măceșu de Jos	34	11	5	18	57	93	−36	38	
14	Progresul Băilești	34	12	3	19	48	61	−13	39	
15	Fulgerul Maglavit	34	9	3	22	59	106	−47	30	
16	Victoria Bratovoiești	34	7	5	22	49	87	−38	26	
17	Tractorul Bechet (O)	34	7	5	22	41	107	−66	26	Qualification to relegation play-off
18	Mecanica Filiași (R)	34	5	7	22	51	141	−90	22	Qualification to relegation play-off

Rules for classification: 1) Points; 2) Goal difference; 3) Number of goals scored.
(C) Champions; (O) Play-off winners; (P) Promoted; (R) Relegated

Relegation play-off

The 17th and 18th-placed teams of the Divizia D faces the 2nd placed teams from the two series of Dolj County Championship. The matches was played on 8 August 1999 on neutral ground at Craiova on Armata and Depou Grounds.

Team 1	Score	Team 2
Tractorul Bechet	2–0	Voința Belcin
Mecanica Filiași	3–4	SCCF Gioroc

=== Galați County ===
Pos	Team	Pld	W	D	L	GF	GA	GD	Pts	Promotion or relegation
1	Șantierul Naval Galați (C, P)	22	21	0	1	98	12	+86	63	Promotion to Divizia C
2	Gloria Ivești	22	13	6	3	41	17	+24	45	
3	Hidraulic Galați	22	12	4	6	64	36	+28	40	
4	Muncitorul Ghidigeni	22	12	4	6	41	37	+4	40	
5	Dunărea Galați II	22	9	8	5	40	31	+9	35	
6	Bujorii Târgu Bujor	22	10	5	7	45	47	−2	35	
7	Metalosport Galați	22	9	6	7	48	40	+8	33	
8	Victoria TC Galați	22	6	4	12	26	47	−21	22	
9	Rapid Șendreni	22	5	3	14	35	50	−15	18	
10	Zino Tudor Vladimirescu	22	5	3	14	31	74	−43	18	
11	Voința Șivița	22	2	5	15	24	65	−41	11	
12	Victoria Independența	22	2	4	16	18	55	−37	10	

Rules for classification: 1) Points; 2) Goal difference; 3) Number of goals scored.
(C) Champions; (P) Promoted

=== Giurgiu County ===
Pos	Team	Pld	W	D	L	GF	GA	GD	Pts	Promotion or relegation
1	Petrolul Roata de Jos (C, P)	28	24	2	2	136	20	+116	74	Promotion to Divizia C
2	Petrolul Corbii Mari	28	22	2	4	118	19	+99	68	
3	Neoconstruct Mihai Bravu	28	22	2	4	109	27	+82	68	
4	Viitorul Mihăilești	28	19	0	9	61	40	+21	57	
5	Voința Slobozia	28	16	3	9	54	33	+21	51	
6	Unirea Bolintin Vale	28	15	3	10	90	46	+44	48	
7	Proinfra Hobaia	28	14	0	14	61	55	+6	42	
8	Unirea Joița	28	12	3	13	59	70	−11	39	
9	Săgeata Brăniștari	28	9	3	16	34	102	−68	30	
10	Voința Grădiștea	28	9	1	18	41	86	−45	25 (Note: Voința Grădiștea deducted 3 points.)	
11	Luceafărul Trestieni	28	9	0	19	40	91	−51	27	
12	Dunacon Giurgiu	28	8	1	19	50	63	−13	25	
13	Mihai Viteazul Călugăreni	28	7	1	20	41	103	−62	22	
14	Nest Clejani	27	5	3	19	28	9	+19	18	
15	Victoria Ulmi	0	0	0	0	0	0	0	0	
16	Avântul Florești	0	0	0	0	0	0	0	0	

Rules for classification: 1) Points; 2) Goal difference; 3) Number of goals scored.
(C) Champions; (P) Promoted

=== Harghita County ===
Pos	Team	Pld	W	D	L	GF	GA	GD	Pts	Promotion or relegation
1	ASA Rapid Miercurea Ciuc (C, P)	28	23	2	3	95	17	+78	71	Promotion to Divizia C
2	Minerul Bălan	28	17	6	5	81	30	+51	57	
3	Complexul Gălăuțaș	28	18	2	8	76	30	+46	56	
4	Unirea Cristuru Secuiesc	28	16	2	10	70	46	+24	50	
5	Meteorul Sânmartin (Note: Meteorul Sânmartin withdrew in the second part of the season and lost all remaining matches with 0–3.)	28	11	1	16	40	59	−19	34	
6	Harghita Odorheiu Secuiesc	28	9	2	17	35	71	−36	29	
7	Viitorul Gheorgheni	28	5	1	22	32	91	−59	16	
8	Metalul Vlăhița	28	5	0	23	24	109	−85	15	

Rules for classification: 1) Points; 2) Goal difference; 3) Number of goals scored.
(C) Champions; (P) Promoted

=== Hunedoara County ===
Pos	Team	Pld	W	D	L	GF	GA	GD	Pts	Promotion or relegation
1	Parângul Lonea (C, P)	22	18	1	3	65	27	+38	55	Promotion to Divizia C
2	Victoria 90 Călan	22	16	2	4	61	21	+40	50	
3	Dacia Orăștie	22	16	1	5	56	14	+42	46 (Note: Dacia Orăștie deducted 1 point.)	
4	CFR Marmosim Simeria	22	13	3	6	53	24	+29	42	
5	Minerul Aninoasa	22	11	2	9	40	25	+15	35	
6	Paroșeni Vulcan	22	8	4	10	29	28	+1	28	
7	Metalul Crișcior	22	8	1	13	29	53	−24	25	
8	Minerul Bărbăteni	22	7	2	13	27	52	−25	23	
9	Constructorul Hunedoara	22	7	1	14	26	57	−31	22	
10	Minerul Ghelari	22	7	1	14	41	57	−16	22	
11	Minerul Teliuc	22	6	3	13	29	45	−16	21	
12	CIF Aliman Brad	22	3	3	16	13	66	−53	12	

Rules for classification: 1) Points; 2) Goal difference; 3) Number of goals scored.
(C) Champions; (P) Promoted

=== Mureș County ===
Pos	Team	Pld	W	D	L	GF	GA	GD	Pts	Promotion or relegation
1	Avântul Silva Reghin (C, P)	30	27	1	2	101	16	+85	82	Promotion to Divizia C
2	Mureșul Romvelo Luduș	30	26	2	2	98	22	+76	80	
3	Electromureș Târgu Mureș	30	17	6	7	70	35	+35	57	
4	Foresta Sovata	30	16	2	12	50	45	+5	50	
5	Iernut	30	15	3	12	70	63	+7	48	
6	Gaz Metan Târgu Mureș	30	13	7	10	66	37	+29	46	
7	Unirea Ungheni	30	13	5	12	51	43	+8	44	
8	Scorillo Sântana de Mureș	30	11	6	13	58	62	−4	39	
9	Avântul Miheșu de Câmpie	30	10	5	15	60	50	+10	35	
10	Mureșul Văleni	30	11	0	19	56	102	−46	33	
11	Frăția Neaua Sângeorgiu de Pădure	30	9	4	17	40	66	−26	31	
12	ASA Cetatea Sighișoara	30	9	4	17	35	71	−36	31	
13	Victoria Sărățeni	30	9	4	17	46	87	−41	31	
14	Cetatea Brâncovenești	30	9	3	18	38	68	−30	30	
15	ZAMUR Târgu Mureș	30	6	7	17	26	66	−40	25	
16	Matricon Târgu Mureș	30	4	9	17	26	64	−38	21	

Rules for classification: 1) Points; 2) Goal difference; 3) Number of goals scored.
(C) Champions; (P) Promoted

=== Neamț County ===
Pos	Team	Pld	W	D	L	GF	GA	GD	Pts	Promotion or relegation
1	Ozana Târgu Neamț (C, P)	24	21	1	2	108	18	+90	64	Promotion to Divizia C
2	Juventus Piatra Neamț	24	20	3	1	90	35	+55	63	
3	Viitorul AGET Podoleni	24	12	3	9	56	63	−7	39	
4	Bradul Roznov	24	12	0	12	57	64	−7	36	
5	Azochim Săvinești	24	10	3	11	53	52	+1	33	
6	Hidroconstrucția Poiana Teiului	24	10	3	11	53	54	−1	33	
7	Sirius Bodești	24	10	3	11	52	65	−13	33	
8	Cobzaru Săbăoani	24	10	1	13	49	59	−10	31	
9	Săvinești	24	10	0	14	45	49	−4	30	
10	Franciscana Roman	24	9	2	13	54	55	−1	29	
11	Siretul Adjudeni	24	7	2	15	43	74	−31	23	
12	Avântul Cordun	24	7	2	15	32	65	−33	23	
13	Unirea Trifești	24	6	1	17	44	93	−49	19	

Rules for classification: 1) Points; 2) Goal difference; 3) Number of goals scored.
(C) Champions; (P) Promoted

=== Sibiu County ===
Pos	Team	Pld	W	D	L	GF	GA	GD	Pts	Promotion or relegation
1	CSU Mecanica Sibiu (C, P)	28	22	6	0	88	22	+66	72	Promotion to Divizia C
2	Geromed Mediaș	28	19	4	5	64	27	+37	61	
3	Carpați Mecanica Mârșa	28	16	6	6	81	32	+49	54	
4	Sparta Mediaș	28	15	7	6	76	36	+40	52	
5	Romanofir Tălmaciu	28	16	4	8	65	39	+26	52	
6	Incstar Agnita	28	14	5	9	71	46	+25	47	
7	COMESO Șeica Mare	28	13	4	11	51	46	+5	43	
8	ASA Sibiu	28	11	3	14	60	54	+6	36	
9	Textila Cisnădie	28	10	1	17	39	69	−30	31	
10	Viitorul Bazna	28	9	3	16	40	63	−23	30	
11	CFR Retezat PIM Sibiu	28	7	8	13	38	50	−12	29	
12	Sevișul Șelimbăr	28	8	3	17	61	88	−27	27	
13	Viitorul Târnava	28	6	5	17	41	73	−32	23	
14	Construcții Sibiu	28	6	5	17	38	64	−26	23	
15	Unirea Ocna Sibiului	28	5	2	21	22	126	−104	17	

Rules for classification: 1) Points; 2) Goal difference; 3) Number of goals scored.
(C) Champions; (P) Promoted

=== Timiș County ===
Pos	Team	Pld	W	D	L	GF	GA	GD	Pts	Promotion or relegation
1	Telecom Timișoara (C, P)	34	27	6	1	85	26	+59	87	Promotion to Divizia C
2	Comtim Azur Șag	34	24	4	6	107	28	+79	76	
3	Sporting Tabac Textila Timișoara	34	21	8	5	89	31	+58	71	
4	Jimbolia	34	22	5	7	76	57	+19	71	
5	Șoimii Timișoara	34	18	9	7	72	30	+42	63	
6	Vulturii Lugoj	34	16	7	11	65	50	+15	55	
7	Unirea Sânnicolau Mare	34	16	4	14	73	59	+14	52	
8	Unirea Peciu Nou	34	15	3	16	71	56	+15	48	
9	Știința Timișoara	34	14	6	14	54	47	+7	48	
10	Furnirul Deta	34	14	5	15	71	56	+15	47	
11	Comtransport Cărpiniș	34	14	3	17	58	70	−12	45	
12	Celuloză și Oțel Timișoara	34	11	9	14	51	56	−5	42	
13	Mănușarul Timișoara	34	13	2	19	48	71	−23	41	
14	Tehnomet Timișoara	34	12	3	19	49	53	−4	39	
15	Frola Sânandrei (Note: Frola Sânandrei started the championship as Frola Variaș.)	34	13	0	21	45	78	−33	39	
16	Timpuri Noi Giarmata (R)	34	11	3	20	58	99	−41	36	Relegation to Timiș County Championship
17	Banatul Teremia Mare (R)	34	4	1	29	31	136	−105	13	Relegation to Timiș County Championship
18	Politehnica Timișoara II (Note: Politehnica Timișoara II withdrew in the second part of the season and lost all remaining matches with 0–3.) (R)	34	1	2	31	16	106	−90	5	Relegation to Timiș County Championship

Rules for classification: 1) Points; 2) Goal difference; 3) Number of goals scored.
(C) Champions; (P) Promoted; (R) Relegated

=== Vâlcea County ===
Pos	Team	Pld	W	D	L	GF	GA	GD	Pts	Promotion or relegation
1	Oltchim Râmnicu Vâlcea (C, P)	28	26	1	1	114	13	+101	79	Promotion to Divizia C
2	Forestierul Băbeni	28	23	2	3	91	25	+66	71	
3	Râmnicu Vâlcea	28	20	2	6	91	32	+59	62	
4	Minerul Râmnicu Vâlcea	28	17	5	6	60	27	+33	56	
5	Lotru Brezoi	28	13	4	11	50	53	−3	43	
6	Minerul Cernișoara	28	10	7	11	52	67	−15	37	
7	Viitorul Carpați	28	11	2	15	55	50	+5	35	
8	Sănătatea Govora	28	11	2	15	57	76	−19	35	
9	Oltețul Alunu	28	11	4	13	55	64	−9	34 (Note: Oltețul Alunu and Păstorul Vaideeni deducted 3 points.)	
10	Petrodam Măciuca	28	10	3	15	61	74	−13	33	
11	Metalul Băbeni	28	9	4	15	50	66	−16	31	
12	Universal Sutești	28	8	1	19	38	60	−22	25	
13	Cozia Călimănești (Note: Cozia Călimănești withdrew in the second part of the season and lost all remaining matches with 0–3.)	28	6	6	16	40	88	−48	24	
14	Păstorul Vaideeni	28	5	5	18	40	88	−48	17	
15	Flacăra Horezu	28	4	5	19	36	116	−80	17	

Rules for classification: 1) Points; 2) Goal difference; 3) Number of goals scored.
(C) Champions; (P) Promoted

== See also ==
- 1998–99 Divizia A
- 1998–99 Divizia B
- 1998–99 Divizia C
- 1998–99 Cupa României
