= János Bojtor =

Romanian professional footballer

Personal information
- Date of birth: 2 February 1958 (age 68)
- Place of birth: Oradea, Romania
- Height: 1.85 m (6 ft 1 in)
- Position: Goalkeeper

Senior career*
Years	Team	Apps	(Gls)
1978–1982	Înfrățirea Oradea	28+	(0+)
1982–1983	Bihor Oradea	6	(0)
1983–1986	Înfrățirea Oradea	22+	(4+)
1986–1989	Jiul Petroșani	58	(3)
1989–1990	Progresul Timișoara	6	(0)
1990–1991	Bihor Oradea	2	(0)
Total		122+	(7+)

Managerial career
- 1991–1995: LPS Bihorul Oradea (GK Coach)
- 1995–2001: Viitorul Oradea (GK Coach)
- 2001–2003: Bihoreana Marghita (GK Coach)
- 2003–2005: Unirea Valea lui Mihai (GK Coach)
- 2005–2010: Liberty Salonta (GK Coach)
- 2010–2015: Partium Oradea (GK Coach)
- 2015–: LPS Bihorul Oradea (GK Coach)
- 2024: CA Oradea (GK Coach)
- * Club domestic league appearances and goals as of 06:55, 26 August 2024 (UTC)

János Bojtor (also known as Ioan Boitor; born 2 February 1958) is a Romanian former professional footballer who played as a goalkeeper for teams such as Înfrățirea Oradea, FC Bihor Oradea, Jiul Petroșani or Progresul Timișoara. Bojtor played 25 matches in the Divizia A and scored 2 goals (in a memorable match played on 30 May 1987, between Jiul Petroșani and Universitatea Craiova, ended with the victory of Jiul, score 3–0). He is currently the goalkeeping coach of CA Oradea.

As a goalkeeper, Bojtor was well known for his reflexes, but also for his goals, officially scoring 2 goals in the first division and 5 goals in the second division, for Jiul and Înfrățirea. Unofficially, he scored approx. 50 goals (no stats for late 1970s and early 1980s at the level of Divizia B and C), most of them for Înfrățirea. As a goalkeeping coach, he worked for various teams such as LPS Bihorul Oradea, Viitorul Oradea or Liberty Salonta, among others and trained goalkeepers such as Marius Popa, Cosmin Vâtcă or Cristian Bălgrădean, among others.

== Honours ==
=== Player ===
Înfrățirea Oradea

- Divizia C: 1984–85

Jiul Petroșani

- Divizia B: 1988–89

Progresul Timișoara

- Divizia A: 1989–90

FC Bihor

- Divizia A: 1990–91

He is also mentioned by the Federația Română de Fotbal (FRF) as one of the rare goalkeepers in Romanian football who scored penalties. (Romanian Football Federation https://www.frf.ro/echipa-frf-ro/portar-golgheter-in-liga-a-4a/)

In a profile article, he is described as: “Un portar de reflex şi un expert al loviturilor de la 11 m … un profesor excelent, cu rezultate mai mult decât notabile ca antrenor. … A lansat în fotbalul românesc nume precum Marius Popa, Cosmin Vâtcă, Cristian Bălgrădean sau Attila Szász, printre alții. ”
