= 1999–2000 Divizia D =

58th season of the Liga IV, the fourth tier of the Romanian football league

Liga IV
- Season: 1999–2000

The 1999–2000 Divizia D was the 58th season of the Liga IV, the fourth tier of the Romanian football league system. The champions of each county association promoted to Divizia C without promotion play-off.

== County leagues ==
- Alba (AB)
- Arad (AR)
- Argeș (AG)
- Bacău (BC)
- Bihor (BH)
- Bistrița-Năsăud (BN)
- Botoșani (BT)
- Brașov (BV)
- Brăila (BR)
- Bucharest (B)
- Buzău (BZ)
- Caraș-Severin (CS)
- Călărași (CL)
- Cluj (CJ)
- Constanța (CT)
- Covasna (CV)
- Dâmbovița (DB)
- Dolj (DJ)
- Galați (GL)
- Giurgiu (GR)
- Gorj (GJ)
- Harghita (HR)
- Hunedoara (HD)
- Ialomița (IL)
- Iași (IS)
- Ilfov (IF)
- Maramureș (MM)
- Mehedinți (MH)
- Mureș (MS)
- Neamț (NT)
- Olt (OT)
- Prahova (PH)
- Satu Mare (SM)
- Sălaj (SJ)
- Sibiu (SB)
- Suceava (SV)
- Teleorman (TR)
- Timiș (TM)
- Tulcea (TL)
- Vaslui (VS)
- Vâlcea (VL)
- Vrancea (VN)

== Leagues standings ==
=== Arad County ===
Pos	Team	Pld	W	D	L	GF	GA	GD	Pts	Promotion or relegation
1	Motorul Astra Arad (C, P)	32	24	2	6	102	36	+66	74	Promotion to Divizia C
2	Șoimii Pâncota	32	18	7	7	69	35	+34	61	
3	Ineu	32	18	4	10	69	39	+30	58	
4	Gloria Arad	32	17	4	11	78	36	+42	55	
5	Tricoul Roșu Arad	32	14	9	9	55	33	+22	51	
6	Crișana Sebiș	32	14	9	9	63	42	+21	51	
7	Comera Arad	32	15	5	12	73	71	+2	50	
8	Șoimii Lipova	32	15	4	13	66	62	+4	49	
9	Frontiera Curtici	32	15	4	13	64	69	−5	49	
10	CPL Arad	32	13	4	15	61	50	+11	43	
11	Crișul Chișineu-Criș	32	12	7	13	53	64	−11	43	
12	Romvest Arad	32	13	4	15	41	57	−16	43	
13	Păulișana Păuliș	32	12	6	14	53	62	−9	42	
14	Victoria Nădlac (R)	32	13	2	17	48	65	−17	41	Relegation to Arad County Championship
15	Semlecana Macea (R)	32	7	9	16	39	76	−37	30	Relegation to Arad County Championship
16	Dacia Beliu (R)	32	6	2	24	30	96	−66	20	Relegation to Arad County Championship
17	Podgoria Ghioroc (R)	32	4	2	26	29	100	−71	14	Relegation to Arad County Championship
18	Minerul Moneasa (Note: Minerul Moneasa withdrew in the first part of the season and all its results were canceled.) (D)	0	0	0	0	0	0	0	0	Withdrew

Rules for classification: 1) Points; 2) Goal difference; 3) Number of goals scored.
(C) Champions; (D) Disqualified; (P) Promoted; (R) Relegated

=== Bihor County ===
Pos	Team	Pld	W	D	L	GF	GA	GD	Pts	Promotion or relegation
1	Oțelul Ștei (C, P)	30	24	3	3	117	29	+88	75	Promotion to Divizia C
2	Romtrans Oradea	30	22	4	4	62	19	+43	70	
3	Arovit Valea lui Mihai	30	19	5	6	67	31	+36	62	
4	Petrolul Suplac	30	17	4	9	89	32	+57	55	
5	Foresta Tileagd	30	14	8	8	52	41	+11	50	
6	Victoria Avram Iancu	30	15	2	13	58	67	−9	47	
7	INCAST Oradea	30	14	3	13	52	61	−9	45	
8	Viitorul Oradea	30	13	5	12	51	27	+24	44	
9	Arcadia Oradea	30	12	8	10	60	46	+14	44	
10	Bihorul Beiuș	30	13	4	13	60	59	+1	43	
11	Minerul Ștei	30	10	8	12	63	44	+19	38	
12	Minerul Șuncuiuș	30	11	2	17	77	96	−19	35	
13	Minerul Vadu Crișului	30	10	3	17	34	55	−21	33	
14	Biharea Vașcău	30	8	4	18	48	92	−44	28	
15	Stăruința Sârbi	30	5	1	24	25	101	−76	16	
16	Minerul Voivozi (Note: Minerul Voivozi was excluded from the championship and lost all remaining matches with 0–3) (R)	30	1	0	29	17	122	−105	3	Relegation to Bihor County Championship

Rules for classification: 1) Points; 2) Goal difference; 3) Number of goals scored.
(C) Champions; (P) Promoted; (R) Relegated

=== Caraș-Severin County ===
Pos	Team	Pld	W	D	L	GF	GA	GD	Pts	Promotion or relegation
1	Minerul Moldova Nouă (C, P)	30	25	1	4	81	21	+60	76	Promotion to Divizia C
2	CFR Caransebeș	30	22	5	3	72	29	+43	71	
3	Muncitorul Reșița	30	21	4	5	78	24	+54	67	
4	Metalul Oțelu Roșu	30	21	1	8	98	46	+52	64	
5	Metalul Bocșa	30	19	3	8	76	33	+43	60	
6	Arsenal Reșița	30	16	2	12	66	36	+30	50	
7	Universitatea Reșița	30	12	6	12	41	43	−2	42	
8	Dunărea Moldova Nouă	30	11	4	15	57	59	−2	37	
9	CFR Oravița	30	11	2	17	61	65	−4	35	
10	Bistra Glimboca	30	10	3	17	52	69	−17	33	
11	Forest Olimp Zăvoi	30	9	6	15	41	61	−20	33	
12	Minerul Cozla	30	10	3	17	42	78	−36	33	
13	Nera Bozovici	30	9	5	16	50	65	−15	32	
14	Minerul Anina	30	9	4	17	46	57	−11	31	
15	Voința Oțelu Roșu (Note: Voința Oțelu Roșu withdrew in the second part of the season and lost all remaining matches with 0–3.) (R)	30	4	4	22	24	96	−72	16	Relegation to Caraș-Severin County Championship
16	Oravița (R)	30	4	1	25	26	129	−103	13	Relegation to Caraș-Severin County Championship

Rules for classification: 1) Points; 2) Goal difference; 3) Number of goals scored.
(C) Champions; (P) Promoted; (R) Relegated

=== Covasna County ===
Pos	Team	Pld	W	D	L	GF	GA	GD	Pts	Promotion or relegation
1	Fortyogó Târgu Secuiesc (C, P)	30	22	3	5	113	28	+85	69	Promotion to Divizia C
2	Perkő Sânzieni	30	19	6	5	62	28	+34	63	
3	Stăruința Bodoc	30	18	3	9	63	34	+29	57	
4	Carpați Covasna	30	15	5	10	70	41	+29	50	
5	Victoria Ozun	30	15	3	12	55	49	+6	46 (Note: Victoria Ozun and ICB Bixad deducted 2 points.)	
6	Nemere Ghelința	30	14	4	12	79	55	+24	46	
7	Avântul Catalina	30	14	2	14	77	63	+14	44	
8	ICB Malnaș	30	13	5	12	56	57	−1	44	
9	Minerul Baraolt	30	14	2	14	61	57	+4	44	
10	Oltul Coșeni	30	13	2	15	62	74	−12	41	
11	Cernat	30	11	6	13	52	64	−12	39	
12	Harghita Aita Mare	30	11	3	16	44	66	−22	36	
13	Prima Brăduț	30	9	5	16	42	61	−19	32	
14	Avântul Ilieni	30	8	6	16	44	74	−30	30	
15	IAS Câmpu Frumos	30	8	4	18	42	94	−52	28	
16	ICB Bixad (R)	30	5	3	22	34	93	−59	16	Relegation to Liga V Covasna

Rules for classification: 1) Points; 2) Goal difference; 3) Number of goals scored.
(C) Champions; (P) Promoted; (R) Relegated

=== Dolj County ===
Pos	Team	Pld	W	D	L	GF	GA	GD	Pts	Promotion or relegation
1	Dunărea Calafat (C, P)	32	28	2	2	104	30	+74	86	Promotion to Divizia C
2	Armata Craiova	32	25	3	4	81	24	+57	78	
3	Gaz Metan Pielești	32	23	1	8	87	37	+50	70	
4	MAT Craiova	32	20	4	8	68	32	+36	64	
5	Wimar Podari	32	17	3	12	64	38	+26	54	
6	CFR Craiova	32	17	3	12	56	42	+14	54	
7	Pan Group Craiova	32	15	5	12	61	45	+16	50	
8	Fulgerul Mârșani	32	13	5	14	60	52	+8	44	
9	Chimia Craiova	32	13	3	16	73	53	+20	42	
10	PRO GPS Segarcea	32	12	3	17	49	64	−15	39	
11	Unirea Leamna	32	10	7	15	53	65	−12	37	
12	Progresul Băilești	32	10	6	16	59	66	−7	36	
13	Autobuzul Craiova	32	10	5	17	61	74	−13	35	
14	Tractorul Bechet	32	10	4	18	56	100	−44	34	
15	Recolta Măceșu de Jos (R)	32	10	2	20	51	91	−40	32	Relegation to Dolj County Championship
16	Victoria Bratovoiești (R)	32	7	6	19	44	93	−49	27	Relegation to Dolj County Championship
17	SCCF Gioroc (R)	32	1	0	31	20	142	−122	3	Relegation to Dolj County Championship

Rules for classification: 1) Points; 2) Goal difference; 3) Number of goals scored.
(C) Champions; (P) Promoted; (R) Relegated

=== Galați County ===
Pos	Team	Pld	W	D	L	GF	GA	GD	Pts	Promotion or relegation
1	Viitorul Costache Negri (C, P)	26	21	2	3	85	26	+59	65	Promotion to Divizia C
2	Hidraulic Galați	26	19	5	2	78	24	+54	62	
3	Gloria Ivești	26	17	3	6	59	24	+35	54	
4	Muncitorul Ghidigeni	26	15	1	10	66	51	+15	46	
5	Metalosport Galați	26	13	6	7	58	38	+20	45	
6	Bujorii Târgu Bujor	26	11	4	11	62	48	+14	37	
7	Dunărea Galați II	26	11	3	12	46	37	+9	36	
8	Victoria Independența	26	10	3	13	37	61	−24	33	
9	Petrolul Schela	26	10	2	14	49	75	−26	32	
10	Progresul Smârdan	26	9	4	13	47	45	+2	31	
11	Zino Tudor Vladimirescu	26	7	4	15	28	62	−34	25	
12	Voința Șivița	26	6	3	17	30	87	−57	21	
13	Rapid Șendreni (Note: Rapid Șendreni excluded in the second half of the season and lost all remaining matches with 0–3.)	26	6	1	19	22	59	−37	19	
14	Victoria TC Galați	26	5	3	18	36	71	−35	18	

Rules for classification: 1) Points; 2) Goal difference; 3) Number of goals scored.
(C) Champions; (P) Promoted

=== Harghita County ===
Pos	Team	Pld	W	D	L	GF	GA	GD	Pts	Promotion or relegation
1	Unirea Cristuru Secuiesc (C, Q)	24	16	4	4	70	28	+42	52	Promotion to Divizia C
2	Minerul Bălan	24	15	1	8	62	31	+31	46	
3	Complexul Gălăuțaș	24	14	1	9	46	32	+14	43	
4	Viitorul Gheorgheni	24	9	4	11	33	41	−8	31	
5	Artes Călimanul Toplița	24	7	4	13	29	60	−31	25	
6	Harghita Odorheiu Secuiesc	24	6	4	14	25	41	−16	22	
7	Șoimii Băile Tușnad	24	5	6	13	36	68	−32	21	

Rules for classification: 1) Points; 2) Goal difference; 3) Number of goals scored.
(C) Champions; (Q) Qualified for the phase indicated

=== Iași County ===
Championship play-off

Pos	Team	Pld	W	D	L	GF	GA	GD	Pts	Promotion or relegation
1	Viitorul Pașcani (C, P)	3	1	2	0	3	1	+2	5	Promotion to Divizia C after tie-breaker
2	RATC Iași	3	1	2	0	3	1	+2	5	Qualification to tie-breaker
3	Voința Mogoșești	3	1	0	2	2	5	−3	3	
4	Siretul Pașcani	3	0	2	1	1	2	−1	2	

Rules for classification: 1) Points; 2) Goal difference; 3) Number of goals scored.
(C) Champions; (P) Promoted

Results

20 June 2000	Siretul Pașcani	0–0	RATC Iași	Târgu Frumos

20 June 2000	Voința Mogoșești	0–2	Viitorul Pașcani	Târgu Frumos

22 June 2000	Siretul Pașcani	0–1	Voința Mogoșești	Târgu Frumos

22 June 2000	RATC Iași	0–0	Viitorul Pașcani	Târgu Frumos

25 June 2000	Viitorul Pașcani	1–1	Siretul Pașcani	Târgu Frumos

25 June 2000	Voința Mogoșești	1–3	RATC Iași	Târgu Frumos

Championship tie-breaker

Viitorul Pașcani and RATC Iași played a play-off match in order to determine the winner of Divizia D Iași. The match tie-breaker was played on 2 June 2000 at Moldova Stadium in Roman.

Team 1	Score	Team 2
Viitorul Pașcani	0–0 (a.e.t.) (4–2 p)	RATC Iași

=== Mureș County ===
Pos	Team	Pld	W	D	L	GF	GA	GD	Pts	Promotion or relegation
1	Gaz Metan Târgu Mureș (C, P)	28	25	2	1	106	17	+89	77	Promotion to Divizia C
2	Electromureș Târgu Mureș	28	24	1	3	73	15	+58	73	
3	Mureșul Romvelo Luduș	28	21	3	4	97	40	+57	66	
4	Scorillo Sântana de Mureș	28	14	8	6	67	36	+31	50	
5	Unirea Bere Mureș Ungheni	28	15	2	11	66	48	+18	47	
6	Foresta Sovata	28	13	5	10	58	45	+13	44	
7	Avântul Miheșu de Câmpie	28	14	2	12	64	52	+12	44	
8	Iernut	28	11	5	12	56	61	−5	35 (Note: Iernut, Cetatea ASA Sighișoara, Cetatea Brâncovenești and Olimpia Râciu deducted 3 points.)	
9	Frăția Neaua Sângeorgiu de Pădure	28	10	4	14	36	45	−9	34	
10	Cetatea ASA Sighișoara	28	10	5	13	51	59	−8	32	
11	Cetatea Brâncovenești	28	8	3	17	36	72	−36	24	
12	Olimpia Râciu	28	7	5	16	40	63	−23	23	
13	Nirajul Miercurea Nirajului	28	6	3	19	27	68	−41	21	
14	Victoria Sărățeni	28	4	2	22	31	88	−57	14	
15	Valea Mureșului Gornești	28	1	2	25	11	116	−105	5	

Rules for classification: 1) Points; 2) Goal difference; 3) Number of goals scored.
(C) Champions; (P) Promoted

=== Neamț County ===
Pos	Team	Pld	W	D	L	GF	GA	GD	Pts	Promotion or relegation
1	CSȘ Târgu Neamț (C, P)	20	19	0	1	90	28	+62	57	Promotion to Divizia C
2	Bradul Roznov	20	15	0	5	57	29	+28	45	
3	Sirius Bodești	20	12	2	6	52	34	+18	38	
4	Viitorul AGET Podoleni	20	11	2	7	61	33	+28	35	
5	Azochim Săvinești	20	9	2	9	49	56	−7	29	
6	Hidroconstrucția Poiana Teiului	20	9	2	9	50	59	−9	29	
7	Juventus Piatra Neamț	20	8	3	9	47	45	+2	27	
8	Cobzaru Săbăoani	20	7	2	11	44	40	+4	23	
9	Avântul Cordun	20	6	2	12	37	45	−8	20	
10	Lorisim Ruginoasa	20	4	1	15	45	73	−28	13	
11	Biruința Negrești	20	2	0	18	11	101	−90	6	

Rules for classification: 1) Points; 2) Goal difference; 3) Number of goals scored.
(C) Champions; (P) Promoted

=== Sibiu County ===
Pos	Team	Pld	W	D	L	GF	GA	GD	Pts	Promotion or relegation
1	Carpați Mecanica Mârșa (C, P)	28	21	4	3	110	25	+85	67	Promotion to Divizia C
2	Sparta Mediaș	28	19	6	3	74	16	+58	63	
3	Incstar Agnita	28	17	6	5	80	35	+45	57	
4	Geromed Mediaș	28	16	7	5	59	27	+32	55	
5	Record Mediaș	28	13	9	6	64	35	+29	48	
6	Telecom Sibiu	28	14	5	9	69	55	+14	47	
7	Romanofir Tălmaciu	28	13	6	9	50	36	+14	45	
8	Sevișul Șelimbăr	28	11	5	12	55	53	+2	38	
9	Textila Cisnădie	28	9	6	13	35	48	−13	33	
10	Construcții Sibiu	28	8	8	12	39	64	−25	32	
11	ASA Sibiu	28	6	8	14	43	77	−34	26	
12	CFR Retezat PIM Sibiu	28	6	4	18	46	69	−23	22	
13	Viitorul Târnava	28	5	5	18	20	64	−44	20	
14	Viitorul Bazna	28	5	3	20	23	102	−79	18	
15	Unirea Ocna Sibiului	28	5	2	21	33	94	−61	17	

Rules for classification: 1) Points; 2) Goal difference; 3) Number of goals scored.
(C) Champions; (P) Promoted

=== Timiș County ===
Pos	Team	Pld	W	D	L	GF	GA	GD	Pts	Promotion or relegation
1	Politehnica Timișoara (C, P)	32	26	4	2	97	31	+66	82	Promotion to Divizia C
2	Comprest Lugoj	32	26	1	5	80	31	+49	79	
3	Vulturii Lugoj	32	19	4	9	68	43	+25	61	
4	Sporting Tabac Textila Timișoara	32	17	6	9	73	48	+25	57	
5	Jimbolia	32	17	6	9	70	52	+18	57	
6	Unirea Peciu Nou	32	17	4	11	69	49	+20	55	
7	Calor Timișoara	32	15	4	13	48	46	+2	49	
8	Celuloză și Oțel Șag	32	14	5	13	52	39	+13	47	
9	Tehnomet Timișoara	32	13	6	13	46	58	−12	45	
10	Șoimii Timișoara	32	13	5	14	52	45	+7	44	
11	Unirea Sânnicolau Mare	32	14	1	17	68	34	+34	43	
12	Obilici Sânmartinu Sârbesc	32	11	7	14	58	52	+6	40	
13	Bayern Timișoara	32	8	6	18	44	58	−14	30 (Note: 1. Comtim 13P.; 2. Bayern 8P.; 3. Dacia 8P.; 4. Furnirul 4P.)	
14	Comtim Timișoara	32	9	3	20	40	69	−29	30	
15	Dacia Timișoara	32	8	6	18	51	70	−19	30	
16	Furnirul Deta (R)	32	9	3	20	54	94	−40	30	Relegation to Timiș County Championship
17	Bancom Fructus Lunga (R)	32	0	1	31	11	152	−141	1	Relegation to Timiș County Championship
18	Comtransport Meget Remetea Mare (Note: Comtransport Meget Remetea Mare withdrew in the first part of the season and all its results were canceled.) (D)	0	0	0	0	0	0	0	0	Withdrew

Rules for classification: 1) Points; 2) Goal difference; 3) Number of goals scored.
(C) Champions; (D) Disqualified; (P) Promoted; (R) Relegated

== See also ==
- 1999–2000 Divizia A
- 1999–2000 Divizia B
- 1999–2000 Divizia C
- 1999–2000 Cupa României
