= Mugur Gușatu =

Romanian footballer and manager

Personal information
- Full name: Mugur Radu Gușatu
- Date of birth: 19 August 1969 (age 57)
- Place of birth: Cezieni, Romania
- Height: 1.92 m (6 ft 4 in)
- Position: Forward

Youth career
- CSȘ Caracal
- Recolta Stoicănești
- FCM Caracal
- Universitatea Craiova

Senior career*
Years	Team	Apps	(Gls)
1991–1992	Constructorul Craiova		
1992	Universitatea Craiova	1	(0)
1993	Constructorul Craiova		
1993–1995	DSV Leoben		
1995–1997	Politehnica Timișoara	57	(26)
1997–1999	Heerenveen	43	(7)
1999	Extensiv Craiova	8	(0)
1999–2000	MTK Budapest	14	(8)
2000–2002	Bihor Oradea	9	(2)
Total		132	(43)

Managerial career
- 2013–2018: Universitatea Craiova (youth)
- 2016–2018: Universitatea II Craiova (assistant)
- 2018–2019: Filiași
- 2019: Politehnica Timișoara
- 2020: Universitatea Craiova U17
- 2021: Universitatea II Craiova
- * Club domestic league appearances and goals

Mugur Radu Gușatu (born 19 August 1969) is a Romanian former professional footballer who played as a forward.

== Playing career ==
Gușatu was born on 19 August 1969 in Cezieni, Romania and began playing junior-level football at local club CSȘ Caracal. He completed his youth development with spells at Recolta Stoicănești, FCM Caracal and Universitatea Craiova, winning a national junior championship with the latter in 1991. He started his senior career by playing for Constructorul Craiova during the 1991–92 Divizia C season. Subsequently, Gușatu returned to "U" Craiova, making his Divizia A debut under coach Ion Oblemenco on 2 December 1992 in a 2–1 home win over Rapid București. However, shortly afterwards, Oblemenco was replaced by Marian Bondrea, who sent Gușatu back to Constructorul.

In 1993, Gușatu went to play for DSV Leoben in the Austrian second division. In the middle of the 1994–95 season, he joined Divizia B club Politehnica Timișoara, scoring 12 goals in 11 matches until season's end to help his side earn promotion to the first league. Subsequently, he netted a personal record of 17 league goals during the 1996–97 season, including one in a 1–0 home win over eventual champions Steaua București. Those goals made him the season's second top-scorer, behind Steaua's Sabin Ilie who scored 31 goals, but his performance was not enough to avoid Politehnica's relegation.

In 1997, Gușatu went to play for Heerenveen, after he was recommended by his compatriot, Rodion Cămătaru. There, he became teammates with fellow Romanians Florin Constantinovici and Dumitru Mitriță. Gușatu was brought to the club as a replacement for Jon Dahl Tomasson who was transferred to Newcastle United. He played two games in the 1997 Intertoto Cup and scored a double in an 8–2 victory against Aalborg BK. Gușatu made his Eredivisie debut on 23 August 1997 when coach Foppe de Haan sent him to replace Jeffrey Talan in a 1–0 away win over NEC Nijmegen. He scored his first goal in the competition on 15 February 1998 in a 4–2 away victory against Sparta Rotterdam. In April 1998, he had a prolific period as he scored four goals, including one in a success over MVV Maastricht, one in a draw against Fortuna Sittard and two in losses to Willem II and Twente. Afterwards, he played three games in the 1998–99 Cup Winners' Cup, as Heerenveen got past Amica Wronki in the first round, but they were defeated in the following round by Varteks. In the same season, he scored a single league goal in a 2–2 draw against Utrecht. Gușatu made his last Eredivisie appearance on 23 March 1999 in Heerenveen's 2–1 away loss to Roda JC Kerkrade, totaling 43 matches with six goals in the competition. During these years, he faced strong competition for a spot in the starting lineup from young Ruud van Nistelrooy.

In 1999, Gușatu returned to Romania, signing with Extensiv Craiova. There, he made his last eight Divizia A appearances, having a total of 66 matches with 26 goals in the competition. Subsequently, Gușatu joined MTK Budapest where he was teammates with compatriot Nicolae Ilea. He made his Nemzeti Bajnokság I debut on 26 February 2000 under coach Henk ten Cate, scoring the winning goal in a 1–0 victory over Újpest. He also scored in each of the next two rounds, helping the team to victories against Lombard Tatabánya and Nagykanizsa. Gușatu netted eight goals in 14 league appearances by the end of the season, including a brace in a 4–0 away victory against Haladás. The team won the 1999–2000 Magyar Kupa, with Gușatu starting the final under Ten Cate before being replaced by Gábor Egressy in the 76th minute as MTK secured a 3–1 win over Vasas. In 2000, he moved to Divizia B club Bihor Oradea for a two-season spell, retiring shortly thereafter.

== Managerial career ==
Gușatu worked several years as a youth coach for Universitatea Craiova, and also had spells at the club's satellite team. From 2018 to 2019, he was head coach of Liga III team Filiași. Subsequently, between 2 September and 23 October 2019, he led Liga II club Politehnica Timișoara, leaving the club after a 1–0 West derby loss to UTA Arad.

== Honours ==
Politehnica Timișoara

- Divizia B: 1994–95

MTK Budapest

- Magyar Kupa: 1999–2000
