= FC Caracal =

FC Caracal can refer to two Romanian football clubs:

- FC Progresul Caracal - a men's football club founded in 1924 and dissolved in 2004 after a merger with FC Craiova (Electroputere Craiova, Extensiv Craiova). The new club was named FC Caracal.
- FC Caracal (2004) - a men's football club named FC Caracal between 2004 and 2013. Dissolved in 2013 (bankruptcy).
