= Mitriță =

Mitriță (Romanian pronunciation: [miˈtrit͡sə]) is a surname. Notable people with the surname include:

- Alexandru Mitriță (born 1995), Romanian footballer
- Dumitru Mitriță (born 1971), Romanian footballer
