= 1991 Cupa României final =

- Event: 1990–91 Cupa României
| Universitatea Craiova | FC Bacău |
| Divizia A | Divizia A |
| 2 | 1 |
- Date: 26 June 1991
- Venue: Stadionul Naţional, Bucharest
- Referee: Ion Crăciunescu (Romania)
- Attendance: 20,000

The 1991 Cupa României final was the 53rd final of Romania's most prestigious cup competition. The final was played at the Stadionul Naţional in Bucharest on 26 June 1991 and was contested between Divizia A winner Universitatea Craiova and FC Bacău. The cup was won by Universitatea Craiova.

== Route to the final ==
Universitatea Craiova

| Round of 32 | Oţelul Galaţi | 0–1 (a.e.t.) | Universitatea Craiova |
| Round of 16 | Rapid București | 2–3 (a.e.t.) | Universitatea Craiova |
| Quarter-finals 1st Leg | Dinamo București | 1–0 | Universitatea Craiova |
| Quarter-finals 2nd Leg | Universitatea Craiova | 2–0 (a.e.t.) (2–1 on Agg.) | Dinamo București |
| Semi-finals 1st Leg | Universitatea Craiova | 4–0 | Unirea Alba Iulia |
| Semi-finals 2nd Leg | Unirea Alba Iulia | 3–0 (3–4 on Agg.) | Universitatea Craiova |

FC Bacău

| Round of 32 | Carpaţi Agnita | 0–1 | FC Bacău |
| Round of 16 | Mureşul Topliţa | 0–1 | FC Bacău |
| Quarter-finals 1st Leg | Argeş Piteşti | 2–1 | FC Bacău |
| Quarter-finals 2nd Leg | FC Bacău | 2–0 (3–2 on Agg.) | Argeş Piteşti |
| Semi-finals 1st Leg | Inter Sibiu | 0–0 | FC Bacău |
| Semi-finals 2nd Leg | FC Bacău | 1–0 (1–0 on Agg.) | Inter Sibiu |

== Match details ==
26 June 1991
20:30 EET

| Universitatea Craiova | 2–1 | FC Bacău |
|---|---|---|
| Zamfir 48', 64' | Report | Jercălău 53' (pen.) |

Stadionul Naţional, Bucharest
Attendance: 20,000
Referee: Ion Crăciunescu (Romania)

| Universitatea Craiova | FC Bacău |

UNIVERSITATEA CRAIOVA:
| GK | 1 | (Romania) Florin Prunea |
| DF | 2 | (Romania) Vasile Mănăilă |
| DF | 3 | (Romania) Emil Săndoi |
| DF | 4 | (Romania) Adrian Popescu (c) |
| DF | 7 | (Romania) Daniel Mogoşanu |
| MF | 5 | (Romania) Gheorghe Ciurea |
| MF | 8 | (Romania) Ion Olaru |
| MF | 6 | (Romania) Nicolae Zamfir |
| MF | 10 | (Romania) Pavel Badea |
| FW | 9 | (Romania) Adrian Pigulea | (substituted off) 87' |
| FW | 11 | (Albania) Roland Agalliu | (substituted off) 46' |
Substitutes:
| FW | 14 | (Romania) Eugen Neagoe | (substituted on) 46' |
| FW | 16 | (Romania) Gheorghe Craioveanu | (substituted on) 87' |
Manager:
(Romania) Sorin Cârţu

FC BACĂU:
| GK | 1 | (Romania) Neculai Alexa |
| DF | 2 | (Romania) Vasile Jercălău |
| DF | 3 | (Romania) Cornel Fâşic |
| DF | 6 | (Romania) Constantin Arteni |
| DF | 4 | (Romania) Florin Ionescu |
| DF | 5 | (Romania) Gheorghe Burleanu (c) |
| MF | 7 | (Romania) Sorin Condurache | (substituted off) 81' |
| MF | 8 | (Romania) Marius Gireadă | (substituted off) 78' |
| MF | 10 | (Romania) Gabriel Hodină |
| FW | 9 | (Romania) Giani Capuşă |
| FW | 11 | (Romania) Neculai Haidău |
Substitutes:
| MF | 13 | (Romania) Gheorghe Popa | (substituted on) 78' |
| FW | 14 | (Romania) Adrian Postolache | (substituted on) 81' |
Manager:
(Romania) Mircea Nedelcu

MATCH OFFICIALS

- Assistant referees:
  - (Romania) Gheorghe Constantin
  - (Romania) Mircea Salomir
- Fourth official:

MAN OF THE MATCH

MATCH RULES

- 90 minutes.
- 30 minutes extra-time (15 minute intervals)
- Penalty shoot-out if scores level after extra time.
- Seven named substitutes
- Maximum of 3 substitutions.
