= Corlătești =

Corlăteşti may refer to several villages in Romania:

- Corlăteşti, a village in Cezieni Commune, Olt County
- Corlăteşti, a village in Berceni, Prahova
