= 1977–78 Divizia B =

Divizia B
- Season: 1977–78
- Promoted: Gloria Buzău; Chimia Râmnicu Vâlcea; Baia Mare
- Relegated: CFR Pașcani; Celuloza Călărași; Minerul Lupeni; CSU Galați; Carpați Sinaia; Armătura Zalău; CS Botoșani; Pandurii Târgu Jiu; Victoria Carei; Relonul Săvinești; Prahova Ploiești; Avântul Reghin

The 1977–78 Divizia B was the 38th season of the second tier of the Romanian football league system.

The format has been maintained to three series, each of them having 18 teams. At the end of the season the winners of the series promoted to Divizia A and the last four places from each series relegated to Divizia C.

== Team changes ==
=== To Divizia B ===
Promoted from Divizia C

- CS Botoșani
- Viitorul Vaslui
- Carpați Sinaia
- Tulcea
- Autobuzul București
- Muscelul Câmpulung
- Pandurii Târgu Jiu
- Minerul Moldova Nouă
- Victoria Carei
- Avântul Reghin
- ICIM Brașov
- Gaz Metan Mediaș

Relegated from Divizia A

- Rapid București
- Progresul București
- FCM Galați

=== From Divizia B ===
Relegated to Divizia C

- Unirea Focșani
- Flacăra-Automecanica Moreni
- Sticla Arieșul Turda
- Borzești
- Voința București
- Rapid Arad
- Minerul Gura Humorului
- SN Oltenița
- IS Câmpia Turzii
- Olimpia Râmnicu Sărat
- Tehnometal București
- Minerul Cavnic

Promoted to Divizia A

- Petrolul Ploiești
- CS Târgoviște
- Olimpia Satu Mare

=== Renamed teams ===
SC Tulcea was renamed as Delta Tulcea.

== League tables ==
=== Serie I ===
Pos	Team	Pld	W	D	L	GF	GA	GD	Pts	Promotion or relegation
1	Gloria Buzău (C, P)	34	22	7	5	58	17	+41	51	Promotion to Divizia A
2	FCM Galați	34	22	3	9	85	31	+54	47	
3	ICIM Brașov	34	16	8	10	38	31	+7	40	
4	CSM Suceava	34	18	3	13	41	39	+2	39	
5	Steagul Roșu Brașov	34	17	3	14	59	40	+19	37	
6	FC Brăila	34	15	5	14	50	35	+15	35	
7	Delta Tulcea	34	15	4	15	42	47	−5	34	
8	Portul Constanța	34	14	6	14	46	53	−7	34	
9	Nitramonia Făgăraș	34	14	5	15	50	45	+5	33	
10	Viitorul Vaslui	34	14	5	15	36	60	−24	33	
11	Victoria Tecuci	34	15	2	17	46	47	−1	32	
12	Ceahlăul Piatra Neamț	34	14	4	16	35	40	−5	32	
13	Oltul Sfântu Gheorghe	34	14	4	16	28	35	−7	32	
14	Tractorul Brașov	34	12	8	14	34	43	−9	32	
15	CFR Pașcani (R)	34	15	1	18	52	59	−7	31	Relegation to Divizia C
16	CSU Galați (R)	34	10	6	18	45	55	−10	26	Relegation to Divizia C
17	CS Botoșani (R)	34	10	2	22	32	62	−30	22	Relegation to Divizia C
18	Relonul Săvinești (R)	34	10	2	22	32	70	−38	22	Relegation to Divizia C

Source: romaniansoccer.ro (in Romanian)
Rules for classification: 1) Points; 2) Goal difference; 3) Goals scored; 4) Head-to-head points; 5) Head-to-head goal difference; 6) Head-to-head goals scored; 7) Head-to-head away goals scored.
(C) Champions; (P) Promoted; (R) Relegated

=== Serie II ===
Pos	Team	Pld	W	D	L	GF	GA	GD	Pts	Promotion or relegation
1	Chimia Râmnicu Vâlcea (C, P)	34	20	2	12	74	38	+36	42	Promotion to Divizia A
2	Dinamo Slatina	34	17	5	12	59	32	+27	39	
3	Metalul Plopeni	34	15	9	10	42	38	+4	39	
4	Rapid București	34	14	10	10	53	34	+19	38	
5	Metalul București	34	15	8	11	46	43	+3	38	
6	Progresul București	34	14	8	12	49	43	+6	36	
7	Autobuzul București	34	13	9	12	50	38	+12	35	
8	Gaz Metan Mediaș	34	14	7	13	37	43	−6	35	
9	Unirea Alexandria	34	13	8	13	34	37	−3	34	
10	Chimia Turnu Măgurele	34	15	4	15	32	37	−5	34	
11	FCM Giurgiu	34	14	6	14	32	53	−21	34	
12	Șoimii Sibiu	34	13	7	14	42	43	−1	33	
13	Electroputere Craiova	34	12	9	13	41	44	−3	33	
14	Muscelul Câmpulung	34	14	5	15	44	51	−7	33	
15	Celuloza Călărași (R)	34	13	6	15	38	38	0	32	Relegation to Divizia C
16	Carpați Sinaia (R)	34	11	9	14	25	40	−15	31	Relegation to Divizia C
17	Pandurii Târgu-Jiu (R)	34	9	8	17	37	53	−16	26	Relegation to Divizia C
18	Prahova Ploiești (R)	34	7	6	21	26	56	−30	20	Relegation to Divizia C

Source: romaniansoccer.ro (in Romanian)
Rules for classification: 1) Points; 2) Goal difference; 3) Goals scored; 4) Head-to-head points; 5) Head-to-head goal difference; 6) Head-to-head goals scored; 7) Head-to-head away goals scored.
(C) Champions; (P) Promoted; (R) Relegated

=== Serie III ===
Pos	Team	Pld	W	D	L	GF	GA	GD	Pts	Promotion or relegation
1	Baia Mare (C, P)	34	22	7	5	80	25	+55	51	Promotion to Divizia A
2	CFR Cluj	34	21	8	5	80	21	+59	50	
3	Universitatea Cluj	34	21	5	8	71	27	+44	47	
4	Gloria Bistrița	34	19	5	10	68	30	+38	43	
5	Mureșul Deva	34	16	5	13	54	40	+14	37	
6	Victoria Călan	34	15	5	14	49	39	+10	35	
7	CFR Timișoara	34	14	6	14	37	32	+5	34	
8	UM Timișoara	34	14	6	14	50	49	+1	34	
9	Aurul Brad	34	14	5	15	47	44	+3	33	
10	Chimica Târnăveni	34	14	4	16	45	50	−5	32	
11	Metalurgistul Cugir	34	13	6	15	43	50	−7	32	
12	CIL Sighetu Marmației	34	12	7	15	38	50	−12	31	
13	Minerul Moldova Nouă	34	13	5	16	32	46	−14	31	
14	Dacia Orăștie	34	13	4	17	36	54	−18	30	
15	Minerul Lupeni (R)	34	13	2	19	26	54	−28	28	Relegation to Divizia C
16	Armătura Zalău (R)	34	11	4	19	40	49	−9	26	Relegation to Divizia C
17	Victoria Carei (R)	34	10	6	18	25	61	−36	26	Relegation to Divizia C
18	Avântul Reghin (R)	34	3	6	25	15	115	−100	12	Relegation to Divizia C

Source: romaniansoccer.ro (in Romanian)
Rules for classification: 1) Points; 2) Goal difference; 3) Goals scored; 4) Head-to-head points; 5) Head-to-head goal difference; 6) Head-to-head goals scored; 7) Head-to-head away goals scored.
(C) Champions; (P) Promoted; (R) Relegated

== See also ==
- 1977–78 Divizia A
- 1977–78 Divizia C
- 1977–78 County Championship
