= Eugen Neagoe =

Romanian footballer and manager

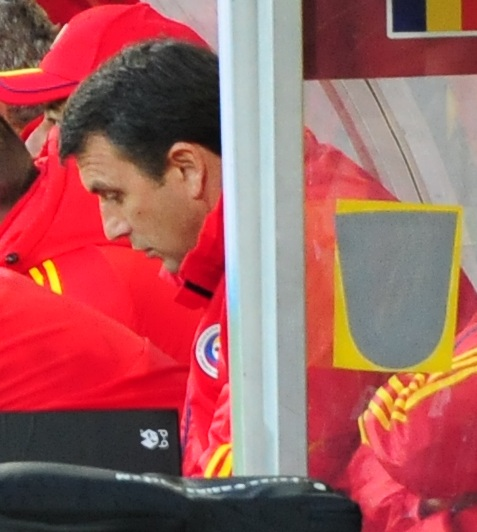
- Neagoe in 2012

Personal information
- Date of birth: 22 August 1967 (age 59)
- Place of birth: Cornu, Romania
- Height: 1.78 m (5 ft 10 in)
- Position: Striker

Youth career
- 1980–1986: Universitatea Craiova

Senior career*
Years	Team	Apps	(Gls)
1986–1993	Universitatea Craiova	110	(29)
1988	→ Electroputere Craiova (loan)		
1992	→ Farul Constanţa (loan)	9	(0)
1993-1994	Vasas	5	(1)
1994	FC Universitatea Craiova	16	(4)
1994–1995	Ferencváros	22	(7)
1995–1996	Alki Larnaca	24	(4)
1996–1997	Omonia Nicosia	22	(1)
1997-1998	Veria	9	(0)
1998	Dinamo București	12	(1)
1998–2003	Extensiv Craiova	77	(35)
1999–2000	→ FC Universitatea Craiova (loan)	21	(3)
Total		327	(85)

International career
1988–1989	Romania U21	5	(1)

Managerial career
- 2005: FC Universitatea Craiova
- 2006–2007: Pandurii Târgu Jiu
- 2008: Pandurii Târgu Jiu
- 2009: Drobeta-Turnu Severin
- 2009: ASIL Lysi
- 2009: FC Universitatea Craiova
- 2010: Steaua București (assistant)
- 2010–2011: FC Universitatea Craiova (assistant)
- 2011–2014: Romania (assistant)
- 2014–2015: Al-Ittihad (assistant)
- 2015–2016: Aris Limassol
- 2016: Nea Salamis
- 2016–2017: Politehnica Iași
- 2017–2019: Sepsi OSK
- 2019: Dinamo București
- 2019: Hermannstadt
- 2020–2021: Astra Giurgiu
- 2022: Universitatea Cluj
- 2023: Universitatea Craiova
- 2023–2024: Argeș Pitești
- 2024–2025: Gloria Buzău
- 2025–2026: Petrolul Ploiești
- * Club domestic league appearances and goals

Eugen Neagoe (born 22 August 1967) is a Romanian professional football manager and former player.

== Personal life ==
He is the cousin of Victor Pițurcă.

While managing Dinamo București, on 21 July 2019, during the match against Universitatea Craiova, Neagoe suffered a heart attack. He was rushed to the ambulance and resuscitated, then he was taken to Floreasca Hospital where he was stabilised.

== Honours ==
=== Player ===
Universitatea Craiova

- Divizia A: 1990–91
- Cupa României: 1990–91, 1992–93

Ferencváros

- Nemzeti Bajnokság I: 1994–95
- Magyar Kupa: 1994–95
- Szuperkupa: 1994

Omonia Nicosia

- Cypriot Cup runner-up: 1996–97

Extensiv Craiova

- Divizia B: 1998–99
