= 1978–79 Divizia C =

Third tier Romanian football league

Divizia C
- Season: 1978–79

The 1978–79 Divizia C was the 23rd season of Liga III, the third tier of the Romanian football league system.

== Team changes ==
=== To Divizia C ===
Relegated from Divizia B

- CFR Pașcani
- Celuloza Călărași
- Minerul Lupeni
- CSU Galați
- Carpați Sinaia
- Armătura Zalău
- CS Botoșani
- Pandurii Târgu Jiu
- Victoria Carei
- Relonul Săvinești
- Prahova Ploiești
- Avântul Reghin

Promoted from County Championship

- Unirea Săveni
- Danubiana Roman
- Hușana Huși
- Carpați Nehoiu
- Metalosport Galați
- Voința Constanța
- Tractorul Viziru
- Arrubium Măcin
- Unirea Bolintin-Vale
- Vâscoza București
- Dinamo Alexandria
- Răsăritul Caracal
- Gloria Drobeta-Turnu Severin
- Bistrița Băbeni
- CIL Blaj
- ICRAL Timișoara
- Tricolorul Beiuș
- Victoria Ineu
- Silvicultorul Maieru
- Viitorul Șimleu Silvaniei
- Construcții Sibiu
- Sticla Târnaveni
- Izvorul Biborțeni
- Mobila Măgura Codlea

=== From Divizia C ===
Promoted to Divizia B

- Minerul Gura Humorului
- Constructorul Iași
- Progresul Brăila
- Chimia Brazi
- Șantierul Naval Oltenița
- Viitorul Scornicești
- Drobeta-Turnu Severin
- Minerul Anina
- Înfrățirea Oradea
- Minerul Cavnic
- Poiana Câmpina
- Industria Sârmei Câmpia Turzii

Relegated to County Championship

- ITA Piatra Neamț
- Unirea Siret
- Flacăra Murgeni
- Petrolistul Dărmănești
- Autobuzul Făurei
- Minerul Măcin
- Petrolul Teleajen Ploiești
- Victoria Florești
- Șoimii Tarom București
- IOR București
- Electrodul Slatina
- Petrolul Târgoviște
- Unirea Drobeta-Turnu Severin
- Mecanizatorul Șimian
- IM Orăștie
- Nera Bozovici
- Gloria Arad
- Voința Carei
- CIL Gherla
- Dermata Cluj-Napoca
- Metalul Târgu Secuiesc
- CPL Sfântu Gheorghe
- Constructorul Alba Iulia
- Soda Ocna Mureș

=== Renamed teams ===
Luceafărul Focșani was moved from Focșani to Adjud and was renamed as Luceafărul Adjud.

Unirea Bolintin-Vale was renamed as Petrolul Bolintin-Vale.

Automobilul Curtea de Argeș was renamed as Electronistul Curtea de Argeș.

Bistrița Băbeni was renamed as Forestierul Băbeni.

IUPS Miercurea Ciuc was renamed as Tractorul Miercurea Ciuc.

Izvorul Biborțeni and Metalul Târgu Secuiesc merged, the first one being absorbed by the second one and was renamed as Izvorul Târgu Secuiesc.

Constructorul Arad merged with CFR Arad, the first one being absorbed by the second one and was renamed as CFR Constructorul Arad.

=== Other changes ===
Relonul Săvinești was replaced by IM Piatra Neamț.

Luceafărul I București and Luceafărul II București were teams of juniors training center of Romanian Football Federation and was enrolled directly in the third tier.

== League tables ==
=== Seria I ===
Pos	Team	Pld	W	D	L	GF	GA	GD	Pts	Promotion or relegation
1	CS Botoșani (C, P)	30	18	8	4	77	13	+64	44	Promotion to Divizia B
2	CFR Pașcani	30	17	2	11	51	35	+16	36	
3	ASA Câmpulung Moldovenesc	30	15	6	9	50	41	+9	36	
4	Metalul Rădăuți	30	15	4	11	49	36	+13	34	
5	Foresta Fălticeni	30	15	3	12	47	35	+12	33	
6	Cristalul Dorohoi	30	14	4	12	55	48	+7	32	
7	Avântul TCMM Frasin	30	13	6	11	48	45	+3	32	
8	Danubiana Roman	30	15	2	13	41	40	+1	32	
9	Dorna Vatra Dornei	30	13	5	12	46	34	+12	31	
10	Zimbrul Suceava	30	12	7	11	36	33	+3	31	
11	Nicolina Iași	30	12	4	14	32	32	0	28	
12	Laminorul Roman	30	11	5	14	45	45	0	27	
13	Metalul Botoșani	30	11	4	15	32	43	−11	26	
14	Siretul Bucecea	30	12	1	17	30	51	−21	25	
15	Tepro Iași (R)	30	8	8	14	29	38	−9	24	Relegation to County Championship
16	Unirea Săveni (R)	30	4	1	25	10	109	−99	9 (Note: Unirea Săveni was excluded from championship after 17 rounds and lost all remaining matches with 0–3.)	Relegation to County Championship

Source: romaniansoccer.ro
Rules for classification: 1) points; 2) goal difference; 3) number of goals scored.
(C) Champions; (P) Promoted; (R) Relegated

=== Seria II ===
Pos	Team	Pld	W	D	L	GF	GA	GD	Pts	Promotion or relegation
1	Energia Gheorghiu-Dej (C, P)	30	21	5	4	66	12	+54	47	Promotion to Divizia B
2	Letea Bacău	30	22	3	5	61	14	+47	47	
3	Partizanul Bacău	30	15	6	9	49	32	+17	36	
4	IM Piatra Neamț	30	14	4	12	40	54	−14	32 (Note: IM Piatra-Neamț replaced Relonul Săvinești after three rounds.)	
5	Petrolul Moinești	30	13	5	12	56	36	+20	31	
6	Borzești	30	12	7	11	44	33	+11	31	
7	Cimentul Bicaz	30	12	5	13	47	49	−2	29	
8	Minerul Comănești	30	11	6	13	35	36	−1	28	
9	Constructorul Vaslui	30	11	6	13	38	47	−9	28	
10	Hușana Huși	30	10	8	12	33	50	−17	28	
11	Demar Mărășești	30	11	5	14	42	45	−3	27	
12	Bradul Roznov	30	12	3	15	49	57	−8	27	
13	Rulmentul Bârlad	30	11	4	15	26	30	−4	26	
14	Cetatea Târgu Neamț	30	10	6	14	32	45	−13	26	
15	Aripile Bacău (R)	30	8	10	12	37	54	−17	26	Relegation to County Championship
16	Oituz Târgu Ocna (R)	30	3	5	22	20	81	−61	11 (Note: Oituz Târgu Ocna was excluded from championship after 27 rounds and lost all remaining matches with 0–3.)	Relegation to County Championship

Source: romaniansoccer.ro
Rules for classification: 1) points; 2) goal difference; 3) number of goals scored.
(C) Champions; (P) Promoted; (R) Relegated

=== Seria III ===
Pos	Team	Pld	W	D	L	GF	GA	GD	Pts	Promotion or relegation
1	Unirea Focșani (C, P)	30	22	5	3	66	11	+55	49	Promotion to Divizia B
2	CSU Galați	30	20	6	4	70	22	+48	46	
3	Dinamo Focșani	30	19	5	6	67	23	+44	43	
4	Prahova Ploiești	30	17	6	7	73	25	+48	40	
5	Ancora Galați	30	12	8	10	35	31	+4	32	
6	Olimpia Râmnicu Sărat	30	12	8	10	27	29	−2	32	
7	Luceafărul Adjud	30	14	0	16	31	59	−28	28	
8	Avântul Urziceni	30	10	7	13	47	47	0	27	
9	Chimia Buzău	30	11	4	15	36	41	−5	26	
10	Oțelul Galați	30	10	6	14	31	47	−16	26	
11	Petrolul Băicoi	30	10	5	15	38	43	−5	25	
12	Foresta Gugești	30	8	8	14	36	61	−25	24	
13	Carpați Nehoiu	30	10	4	16	25	54	−29	24	
14	Petrolul Berca	30	9	5	16	48	61	−13	23	
15	Petrolistul Boldești (R)	30	8	7	15	32	48	−16	23	Relegation to County Championship
16	Metalosport Galați (R)	30	4	4	22	20	80	−60	12	Relegation to County Championship

Source: romaniansoccer.ro
Rules for classification: 1) points; 2) goal difference; 3) number of goals scored.
(C) Champions; (P) Promoted; (R) Relegated

=== Seria IV ===
Pos	Team	Pld	W	D	L	GF	GA	GD	Pts	Promotion or relegation
1	Cimentul Medgidia (C, P)	30	21	3	6	66	21	+45	45	Promotion to Divizia B
2	Azotul Slobozia	30	19	5	6	81	30	+51	43	
3	Unirea Tricolor Brăila	30	19	3	8	67	34	+33	41	
4	Pescărușul Tulcea	30	18	2	10	60	35	+25	38	
5	Șoimii Cernavodă	30	15	6	9	53	36	+17	36	
6	IMU Medgidia	30	13	6	11	45	36	+9	32	
7	Voința Constanța	30	14	4	12	40	33	+7	32	
8	Unirea Știința Eforie Nord	30	11	7	12	33	52	−19	29	
9	Granitul Babadag	30	10	6	14	29	49	−20	26	
10	Victoria Țăndărei	30	11	3	16	37	57	−20	25	
11	Electrica Constanța	30	10	4	16	43	51	−8	24	
12	Dacia Unirea Brăila	30	10	4	16	30	58	−28	24	
13	Marina Mangalia	30	9	5	16	51	50	+1	23	
14	Chimpex Constanța	30	10	3	17	35	44	−9	23	
15	Tractorul Viziru (R)	30	7	6	17	34	69	−35	20	Relegation to County Championship
16	Arrubium Măcin (R)	30	9	1	20	36	85	−49	19	Relegation to County Championship

Source: romaniansoccer.ro
Rules for classification: 1) points; 2) goal difference; 3) number of goals scored.
(C) Champions; (P) Promoted; (R) Relegated

=== Seria V ===
Pos	Team	Pld	W	D	L	GF	GA	GD	Pts	Promotion or relegation
1	Mecanică Fină București (C, P)	34	21	10	3	70	20	+50	52	Promotion to Divizia B
2	TMB București	34	22	5	7	67	28	+39	49	
3	Automatica București	34	18	9	7	56	31	+25	45	
4	Celuloza Călărași	34	18	6	10	50	30	+20	42	
5	ICSIM București	34	17	6	11	70	39	+31	40	
6	Voința București	34	16	8	10	64	39	+25	40	
7	Unirea Tricolor București	34	15	9	10	51	36	+15	39	
8	Abatorul București	34	15	7	12	50	42	+8	37	
9	Electronica Obor București	34	13	10	11	35	32	+3	36	
10	Flacăra Roșie București	34	10	15	9	32	34	−2	35	
11	Petrolul Bolintin-Vale	34	15	5	14	52	66	−14	35	
12	Sirena București	34	11	12	11	39	39	0	34	
13	Tehnometal București	34	12	8	14	38	38	0	32	
14	Vâscoza București	34	10	11	13	38	33	+5	31	
15	Automecanica București (R)	34	12	6	16	39	43	−4	30	Relegation to County Championship
16	Luceafărul II București (R)	34	6	3	25	31	89	−58	15	Relegation to County Championship
17	Victoria Lehliu (R)	34	5	3	26	23	101	−78	13 (Note: Victoria Lehliu was excluded from championship because the team wasn't present at two matches, in rounds 29 and 30.)	Relegation to County Championship
18	Luceafărul I București (R)	34	2	3	29	19	84	−65	7 (Note: Luceafărul I București withdrew from championship at the end of first part of the season.)	Relegation to County Championship

Source: romaniansoccer.ro
Rules for classification: 1) points; 2) goal difference; 3) number of goals scored.
(C) Champions; (P) Promoted; (R) Relegated

=== Seria VI ===
Pos	Team	Pld	W	D	L	GF	GA	GD	Pts	Promotion or relegation
1	Flacăra-Automecanica Moreni (C, P)	30	20	4	6	72	25	+47	44	Promotion to Divizia B
2	Rova Roșiorii de Vede	30	15	6	9	48	31	+17	36	
3	Metalul Mija	30	13	9	8	48	27	+21	35	
4	Progresul Pucioasa	30	15	3	12	43	34	+9	33	
5	Cimentul Fieni	30	12	7	11	25	31	−6	31	
6	Progresul Corabia	30	11	8	11	42	43	−1	30	
7	IOB Balș	30	14	2	14	44	47	−3	30	
8	Recolta Stoicănești	30	13	4	13	29	55	−26	30	
9	Dacia Pitești	30	11	6	13	35	34	+1	28	
10	Dinamo Alexandria	30	10	8	12	36	51	−15	28	
11	Petrolul Videle	30	11	5	14	35	39	−4	27	
12	Electronistul Curtea de Argeș	30	11	5	14	35	47	−12	27	
13	Constructorul Pitești	30	9	9	12	29	50	−21	27	
14	Răsăritul Caracal	30	11	4	15	48	45	+3	26	
15	Chimia Găești (R)	30	10	5	15	43	50	−7	25	Relegation to County Championship
16	Cetatea Turnu Măgurele (R)	30	10	3	17	42	45	−3	23	Relegation to County Championship

Source: romaniansoccer.ro
Rules for classification: 1) points; 2) goal difference; 3) number of goals scored.
(C) Champions; (P) Promoted; (R) Relegated

=== Seria VII ===
Pos	Team	Pld	W	D	L	GF	GA	GD	Pts	Promotion or relegation
1	Pandurii Târgu Jiu (C, P)	30	21	4	5	98	33	+65	46	Promotion to Divizia B
2	Minerul Lupeni	30	17	1	12	59	36	+23	35	
3	CFR Craiova	30	16	3	11	46	33	+13	35	
4	Dierna Orșova	30	16	3	11	52	43	+9	35	
5	Minerul Motru	30	14	4	12	56	35	+21	32	
6	Lotru Brezoi	30	15	2	13	47	43	+4	32	
7	Metalurgistul Sadu	30	12	7	11	54	49	+5	31	
8	Progresul Băilești	30	12	4	14	52	53	−1	28	
9	Constructorul TCI Craiova	30	10	8	12	38	42	−4	28	
10	Chimistul Râmnicu Vâlcea	30	12	3	15	34	45	−11	27	
11	Minerul Vulcan	30	10	7	13	35	49	−14	27	
12	Minerul Rovinari	30	12	3	15	30	54	−24	27	
13	Unirea Drăgășani	30	11	4	15	43	54	−11	26	
14	Gloria Drobeta-Turnu Severin	30	10	6	14	43	59	−16	26	
15	Forestierul Băbeni (R)	30	11	3	16	37	64	−27	25	Relegation to County Championship
16	Constructorul Târgu Jiu (R)	30	9	2	19	35	67	−32	20	Relegation to County Championship

Source: romaniansoccer.ro
Rules for classification: 1) points; 2) goal difference; 3) number of goals scored.
(C) Champions; (P) Promoted; (R) Relegated

=== Seria VIII ===
Pos	Team	Pld	W	D	L	GF	GA	GD	Pts	Promotion or relegation
1	Unirea Alba Iulia (C, P)	30	20	1	9	49	21	+28	41	Promotion to Divizia B
2	Unirea Sânnicolau Mare	30	18	5	7	46	27	+19	41	
3	Vulturii Textila Lugoj	30	17	3	10	54	32	+22	37	
4	Unirea Tomnatic	30	14	5	11	47	31	+16	33	
5	Gloria Reșița	30	14	3	13	55	42	+13	31	
6	Metalul Bocșa	30	14	2	14	38	45	−7	30	
7	Minerul Oravița	30	12	5	13	45	46	−1	29	
8	Laminorul Nădrag	30	13	3	14	44	46	−2	29	
9	Știința Petroșani	30	12	5	13	45	48	−3	29	
10	Metalul Oțelu Roșu	30	12	4	14	46	40	+6	28	
11	Electromotor Timișoara	30	11	6	13	45	44	+1	28	
12	CFR Simeria	30	12	3	15	32	42	−10	27	
13	CIL Blaj	30	10	6	14	29	46	−17	26	
14	Minerul Ghelar	30	10	5	15	32	44	−12	25	
15	ICRAL Timișoara (R)	30	10	4	16	27	52	−25	24 (Note: ICRAL Timișoara was relegated in districtual championship for kicking the referee in the match against Unirea Alba-Iulia from round 28.)	Relegation to County Championship
16	Metalul Hunedoara (R)	30	9	4	17	23	51	−28	22	Relegation to County Championship

Source: romaniansoccer.ro
Rules for classification: 1) points; 2) goal difference; 3) number of goals scored.
(C) Champions; (P) Promoted; (R) Relegated

=== Seria IX ===
Pos	Team	Pld	W	D	L	GF	GA	GD	Pts	Promotion or relegation
1	Strungul Arad (C, P)	30	19	7	4	68	16	+52	45	Promotion to Divizia B
2	Bihoreana Marghita	30	15	7	8	54	31	+23	37	
3	Sticla Arieșul Turda	30	14	9	7	45	28	+17	37	
4	Metalul Aiud	30	13	8	9	43	28	+15	34	
5	Tricolorul Beiuș	30	10	12	8	37	27	+10	32	
6	Rapid Arad	30	9	13	8	36	32	+4	31	
7	CFR Constructorul Arad	30	12	7	11	33	33	0	31	
8	Recolta Salonta	30	12	6	12	37	46	−9	30	
9	Voința Oradea	30	12	5	13	42	36	+6	29	
10	Unirea Dej	30	10	7	13	38	45	−7	27	
11	CM Cluj-Napoca	30	11	5	14	39	46	−7	27	
12	Victoria Ineu	30	10	7	13	31	38	−7	27	
13	Oțelul Bihor	30	8	10	12	22	47	−25	26	
14	Minerul Șuncuiuș	30	11	3	16	33	59	−26	25	
15	Minerul Bihor (R)	30	8	5	17	30	51	−21	21	Relegation to County Championship
16	Tehnofrig Cluj-Napoca (R)	30	6	9	15	21	46	−25	21	Relegation to County Championship

Source: romaniansoccer.ro
Rules for classification: 1) points; 2) goal difference; 3) number of goals scored.
(C) Champions; (P) Promoted; (R) Relegated

=== Seria X ===
Pos	Team	Pld	W	D	L	GF	GA	GD	Pts	Promotion or relegation
1	Someșul Satu Mare (C, P)	30	19	4	7	61	19	+42	42	Promotion to Divizia B
2	Armătura Zalău	30	17	2	11	63	36	+27	36	
3	Minerul Rodna	30	15	3	12	55	38	+17	33	
4	Cuprom Baia Mare	30	15	3	12	48	40	+8	33	
5	Oașul Negrești	30	14	4	12	58	31	+27	32	
6	Minerul Ilba-Seini	30	15	2	13	52	42	+10	32	
7	Minerul Baia Sprie	30	13	5	12	56	38	+18	31	
8	Lăpușul Târgu Lăpuș	30	14	3	13	47	47	0	31	
9	Victoria Carei	30	14	2	14	54	36	+18	30	
10	Minerul Băița	30	13	4	13	44	45	−1	30	
11	Bradul Vișeu de Sus	30	12	5	13	30	52	−22	29	
12	Minerul Băiuț	30	13	2	15	40	38	+2	28	
13	Hebe Sângeorz-Băi	30	10	8	12	41	47	−6	28	
14	Silvicultorul Maieru	30	12	2	16	39	77	−38	26	
15	Rapid Jibou (R)	30	10	3	17	36	64	−28	23	Relegation to County Championship
16	Viitorul Șimleu Silvaniei (R)	30	6	4	20	27	101	−74	16	Relegation to County Championship

Source: romaniansoccer.ro
Rules for classification: 1) points; 2) goal difference; 3) number of goals scored.
(C) Champions; (P) Promoted; (R) Relegated

=== Seria XI ===
Pos	Team	Pld	W	D	L	GF	GA	GD	Pts	Promotion or relegation
1	Carpați Mârșa (C, P)	28	18	3	7	55	28	+27	39	Promotion to Divizia B
2	Metalul Sighișoara	28	15	2	11	43	27	+16	32	
3	Foresta Bistrița	28	14	3	11	49	35	+14	31	
4	Utilajul Făgăraș	28	13	4	11	34	24	+10	30	
5	Chimia Victoria	28	13	4	11	38	37	+1	30	
6	Oțelul Reghin	28	13	2	13	48	39	+9	28	
7	Construcții Sibiu	28	11	5	12	31	39	−8	27	
8	Mureșul Luduș	28	10	6	12	49	40	+9	26	
9	Avântul Reghin	28	11	4	13	35	39	−4	26	
10	IPA Sibiu	28	11	4	13	35	41	−6	26	
11	IMIX Agnita	28	13	0	15	37	46	−9	26	
12	Metalul Copșa Mică	28	12	2	14	31	45	−14	26	
13	Automecanica Mediaș	28	10	5	13	29	38	−9	25	
14	Sticla Târnaveni	28	12	1	15	32	59	−27	25	
15	Inter Sibiu (R)	28	7	9	12	27	36	−9	23	Relegation to County Championship
16	Textila Cisnădie (D)	0	0	0	0	0	0	0	0 (Note: Textila Cisnădie was excluded from championship after the incidents from the match with Chimia Victoria (0–1, in round 8))	Excluded

Source: romaniansoccer.ro
Rules for classification: 1) points; 2) goal difference; 3) number of goals scored.
(C) Champions; (D) Disqualified; (P) Promoted; (R) Relegated

=== Seria XII ===
Pos	Team	Pld	W	D	L	GF	GA	GD	Pts	Promotion or relegation
1	Viitorul Gheorgheni (C, P)	30	20	4	6	55	22	+33	44	Promotion to Divizia B
2	Carpați Sinaia	30	18	5	7	58	21	+37	41	
3	Progresul Odorheiu Secuiesc	30	16	6	8	55	24	+31	38	
4	Izvorul Târgu Secuiesc	30	15	4	11	44	40	+4	34	
5	Metrom Brașov	30	14	5	11	47	39	+8	33	
6	Caraimanul Bușteni	30	14	3	13	38	33	+5	31	
7	Tractorul Miercurea Ciuc	30	13	5	12	34	38	−4	31	
8	Torpedo Zărnești	30	14	2	14	44	46	−2	30	
9	Minerul Bălan	30	13	3	14	37	40	−3	29	
10	Precizia Săcele	30	12	5	13	31	34	−3	29	
11	Minerul Baraolt	30	13	3	14	46	52	−6	29	
12	Carpați Brașov	30	11	6	13	29	39	−10	28	
13	Mobila Măgura Codlea	30	11	4	15	38	35	+3	26	
14	CSU Brașov	30	9	7	14	31	38	−7	25	
15	Avântul Măneciu (R)	30	10	5	15	28	47	−19	25	Relegation to County Championship
16	IRA Câmpina (R)	30	2	3	25	13	80	−67	7 (Note: IRA Câmpina was excluded from championship after 17 rounds because of the incidents from the match with Viitorul Gheorgheni.)	Relegation to County Championship

Source: romaniansoccer.ro
Rules for classification: 1) points; 2) goal difference; 3) number of goals scored.
(C) Champions; (P) Promoted; (R) Relegated

== See also ==
- 1978–79 Divizia A
- 1978–79 Divizia B
- 1978–79 County Championship
- 1978–79 Cupa României
