= Nicolae Oțeleanu =

Romanian footballer

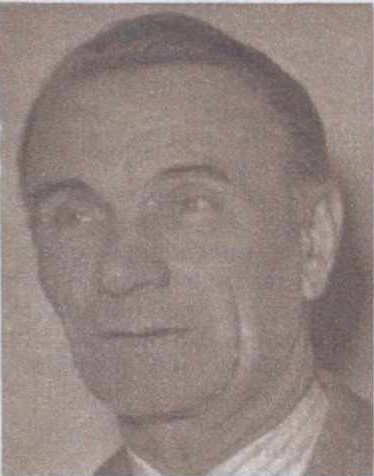

Personal information
- Full name: Nicolae Pascu Oțeleanu
- Date of birth: 6 January 1908
- Place of birth: Brăila, Romania
- Date of death: 5 May 1970 (aged 62)
- Place of death: Craiova, Romania
- Position: Defender

Senior career*
Years	Team	Apps	(Gls)
1925–1929	Sparta București		
1929–1933	Sportul Studențesc București		
1933–1937	Sporting Chișinău		

International career
1926	Romania	1	(0)

Managerial career
- 1953: Armata Craiova
- 1954–1956: Universitatea Craiova
- Metalul 7 Noiembrie Craiova
- Progresul Caracal
- Progresul Craiova
- 1963–1965: Universitatea Craiova
- 1967–1968: Electroputere Craiova
- * Club domestic league appearances and goals

Nicolae Pascu Oțeleanu (6 January 1908 - 5 May 1970) was a Romanian football defender and manager, and also a World War II veteran.

== Life and career ==
Oțeleanu was born on 6 January 1908 in Brăila, Romania. He played football as a defender for Sparta București (1925–1929), Sportul Studențesc București (1929–1933) and Sporting Chișinău (1933–1937). Oțeleanu made one appearance for Romania on 25 April 1926, playing the entire match under coach Teofil Morariu in a 6–1 friendly victory against Bulgaria, played at the Romcomit Stadium in Bucharest.

He fought for the Romanian Armed Forces in World War II as a lieutenant colonel and was decorated for his achievements.

In 1953, Oțeleanu became a manager at Armata Craiova. He was the first coach to promote Universitatea Craiova to the second division in 1954 and in a second spell he promoted them to the first division in 1964. Subsequently, he was the first manager who promoted Electroputere Craiova to the second division in 1968. He also had coaching spells at Metalul 7 Noiembrie Craiova, Progresul Caracal and Progresul Craiova.

Oțeleanu died on 5 May 1970 in Craiova at age 62.

== Honours ==
=== Military decorations ===
- Ordinul "Steaua României" cu spade şi panglici de Virtute Militară, clasa a V-a (Order "Star of Romania" with swords and ribbons of Military Virtue, 5th class) (1945)
- Medalia Eliberarea de sub jugul fascist (Medal Liberation from the fascist yoke) (20 August 1947)
- Crucea cehoslovacă (The Czechoslovak Cross) (1947)
- Medalia Pentru Victoria asupra Germaniei în Marele Război de Apărare a Patriei (Medal for Victory over Germany in the Great Patriotic War) (1941–1945)

=== Manager ===
Universitatea Craiova

- Divizia B: 1963–64

Electroputere Craiova

- Divizia C: 1967–68
