= 1977–78 County Championship =

36th season of the Liga IV, the fourth tier of the Romanian football league

Liga IV
- Season: 1977–78

The 1977–78 County Championship was the 36th season of the Liga IV, the fourth tier of the Romanian football league system. The champions of each county association play against one from a neighboring county in a play-off to gain promotion to Divizia C.

== County championships ==
- Alba (AB)
- Arad (AR)
- Argeș (AG)
- Bacău (BC)
- Bihor (BH)
- Bistrița-Năsăud (BN)
- Botoșani (BT)
- Brașov (BV)
- Brăila (BR)
- Bucharest (B)
- Buzău (BZ)
- Caraș-Severin (CS)
- Cluj (CJ)
- Constanța (CT)
- Covasna (CV)
- Dâmbovița (DB)
- Dolj (DJ)
- Galați (GL)
- Gorj (GJ)
- Harghita (HR)
- Hunedoara (HD)
- Ialomița (IL)
- Iași (IS)
- Ilfov (IF)
- Maramureș (MM)
- Mehedinți (MH)
- Mureș (MS)
- Neamț (NT)
- Olt (OT)
- Prahova (PH)
- Satu Mare (SM)
- Sălaj (SJ)
- Sibiu (SB)
- Suceava (SV)
- Teleorman (TR)
- Timiș (TM)
- Tulcea (TL)
- Vaslui (VS)
- Vâlcea (VL)
- Vrancea (VN)

== Promotion play-off ==
Teams promoted to Divizia C without a play-off matches as teams from less represented counties in the third division.

- (AB) CIL Blaj
- (VS) Hușana Huși
- (SJ) Viitorul Șimleu Silvaniei
- (IF) Unirea Bolintin-Vale
- (TL) Arrubium Măcin
- (BR) Tractorul Viziru
- (MH) Gloria Drobeta-Turnu Severin
- (CV) Izvorul Biborțeni

The matches were played on 9 and 16 July 1978.

Team 1	Agg.	Team 2	1st leg	2nd leg
Dinamo Alexandria (TR)	4–0	(DJ) Dunărea Calafat	3–0	1–0
Tricolorul Beiuș (BH)	0–0 (4–3 p)	(MM) Minerul Borșa	0–0	0–0
Metalosport Galați (GL)	7–6	(IS) Recolta Ruginoasa	5–1	2–5
Gloria Berevoești (AG)	2–3	(OT) Răsăritul Caracal	1–1	1–2
CFR Caransebeș (CS)	2–2 (Note: Victoria Ineu won on the away goals rule.)	(AR) Victoria Ineu	2–1	0–1
Aurul Certej (HD)	0–6	(TM) ICRAL Timișoara	0–0	0–6
ICIM Câmpina (PH)	0–1	(BV) Mobila Măgura Codlea	0–0	0–1
Mureșul Toplița (HR)	1–3	(MS) Sticla Târnaveni	1–0	0–3
Parângul Novaci (GJ)	1–4	(VL) Bistrița Băbeni	1–2	0–2
Victoria Bacău (BC)	0–3	(NT) Danubiana Roman	0–0	0–3
Rapid Fetești (IL)	2–4	(CT) Voința Constanța	2–0	0–4
Carpați Nehoiu (BZ)	2–1	(VN) Energia Vulturu	2–0	0–1
Viitorul ICMA Cluj-Napoca (CJ)	3–3 (Note: Construcții Sibiu won on the away goals rule.)	(SB) Construcții Sibiu	3–1	0–2
Electrica Titu (DB)	1–2	(B) Vâscoza București	1–1	0–1
Silvicultorul Maieru (BN)	5–2	(SM) Minerul Turț	4–0	1–2
Avântul Gălănești (SV)	4–4 (1–4 p)	(BT) Unirea Săveni	3–1	1–3

== Championships standings ==
=== Arad County ===
Series I

Pos	Team	Pld	W	D	L	GF	GA	GD	Pts	Qualification or relegation
1	Frontiera Curtici (Q)	30	18	7	5	71	28	+43	43	Qualification to championship final
2	Indagrara Arad	30	18	6	6	76	37	+39	42	
3	Mureșul Arad	30	16	9	5	49	24	+25	41	
4	Șoimii Pâncota	30	15	8	7	59	36	+23	38	
5	Foresta Arad	30	15	7	8	61	43	+18	37	
6	Chimia Arad	30	15	6	9	59	28	+31	36	
7	Gloria Ineu	30	15	4	11	49	39	+10	34	
8	Șiriana Șiria	30	14	4	12	59	56	+3	32	
9	Viitorul Turnu	30	12	6	12	59	51	+8	30	
10	Voința Macea	30	12	6	12	52	54	−2	30	
11	Progresul Pecica	30	11	7	12	55	46	+9	29	
12	Dacia Beliu	30	11	6	13	52	67	−15	28	
13	Stăruința Dorobanți	30	11	4	15	44	54	−10	26	
14	Înfrățirea Iratoșu	30	10	4	16	53	43	+10	24	
15	Olimpia Bocsig	30	2	3	25	22	108	−86	5 (Note: Olimpia Bocsig and Viitorul Șepreuș deducted two points.)	
16	Viitorul Șepreuș	30	1	1	28	9	115	−106	1	

Rules for classification: 1) Points; 2) Goal difference; 3) Number of goals scored.
(Q) Qualified for the phase indicated
Notes:

Series II

Pos	Team	Pld	W	D	L	GF	GA	GD	Pts	Qualification or relegation
1	Victoria Ineu (Q)	30	22	6	2	87	24	+63	50	Qualification to championship final
2	Victoria Chișineu-Criș	30	22	0	8	107	45	+62	44	
3	FZ Arad	30	17	7	6	61	31	+30	41	
4	Șoimii Lipova	30	16	4	10	63	38	+25	36	
5	Crișana Sebiș	30	14	7	9	52	34	+18	35	
6	Mureșul Zădăreni	30	13	7	10	61	50	+11	33	
7	Fulgerul Arad	30	12	8	10	66	62	+4	32	
8	Unirea Șofronea	30	14	5	11	68	54	+14	31 (Note: Unirea Șofronea and Viitorul Tisa Nouă deducted two points.)	
9	Victoria Zăbrani	30	12	3	15	46	52	−6	27	
10	CFR Gurahonț	30	10	6	14	61	68	−7	26	
11	Unirea Aluniș	30	9	7	14	37	73	−36	25	
12	Motorul Arad	30	11	2	17	57	57	0	24	
13	Unirea Sântana	30	9	5	16	39	68	−29	23	
14	Libertatea Arad	30	8	5	17	43	70	−27	21	
15	Viitorul Tisa Nouă	30	7	3	20	36	87	−51	15	
16	Semlecana Semlac	30	6	1	23	39	110	−71	13	

Rules for classification: 1) Points; 2) Goal difference; 3) Number of goals scored.
(Q) Qualified for the phase indicated
Notes:

Championship final

The matches were played on 11 and 18 June 1978.

Team 1	Agg.	Team 2	1st leg	2nd leg
Frontiera Curtici	2–4	Victoria Ineu	2–0	0–4

Victoria Ineu won the Arad County Championship and qualify for promotion play-off in Divizia C.

=== Botoșani County ===
The championship play-off was contested in a single round-robin tournament featuring the winners and runners-up of the two county series.

Pos	Team	Pld	W	D	L	GF	GA	GD	Pts	Qualification
1	Unirea Săveni (C, Q)	3	2	0	1	10	4	+6	4	Qualification to promotion play-off
2	Gloria Todireni	3	2	0	1	8	8	0	4	
3	Sănătatea Darabani	3	1	1	1	5	4	+1	3	
4	Avântul Albești	3	0	1	2	5	12	−7	1	

Rules for classification: 1) Points; 2) Goal difference; 3) Number of goals scored.
(C) Champions; (Q) Qualified for the phase indicated

Results

Unirea Săveni	5–1	Gloria Todireni

Sănătatea Darabani	2–2	Avântul Albești

Unirea Săveni	5–1	Avântul Albești

Gloria Todireni	2–1	Sănătatea Darabani

Sănătatea Darabani	2–0	Unirea Săveni

Gloria Todireni	5–2	Avântul Albești

=== Caraș-Severin County ===
Pos	Team	Pld	W	D	L	GF	GA	GD	Pts	Qualification or relegation
1	CFR Caransebeș (C, Q)	34	24	3	7	87	30	+57	51	Qualification to promotion play-off
2	CPL Caransebeș	34	21	8	5	90	22	+68	50	
3	Muncitorul Reșița	34	18	10	6	54	34	+20	46	
4	Victoria Caransebeș	34	19	7	8	95	36	+59	45	
5	Autoforesta Bocșa	34	17	6	11	61	42	+19	40	
6	Energia Reșița	34	17	3	14	89	55	+34	37	
7	Siderurgistul Reșița	34	16	5	13	66	46	+20	37	
8	Foresta Zăvoi	34	15	7	12	55	48	+7	37	
9	Eletromecanica Reșița	34	16	4	14	72	64	+8	36	
10	Minerul Ocna de Fier	34	16	2	16	62	60	+2	34	
11	Autometalul Caransebeș	34	14	6	14	48	49	−1	34	
12	CFR Oravița	34	12	4	18	61	74	−13	28	
13	Bistra Glimboca	34	11	2	21	47	76	−29	24	
14	Progresul Băile Herculane	34	9	6	19	41	76	−35	24	
15	Recolta Berzovia	34	8	8	18	45	80	−35	24	
16	Metalul Topleț	34	9	6	19	44	96	−52	24	
17	ATA Oravița	34	8	7	19	34	81	−47	23	
18	Minerul Dognecea	34	8	2	24	26	108	−82	18	

Rules for classification: 1) Points; 2) Goal difference; 3) Number of goals scored.
(C) Champions; (Q) Qualified for the phase indicated

=== Galați County ===
Championship final

Team 1	Agg.	Team 2	1st leg	2nd leg
Victoria TC Galați	1–3	Metalosport Galați	0–2	1–1

Metalosport Galați won the Galați County Championship and qualify for promotion play-off in Divizia C.

=== Harghita County ===
Series I

Pos	Team	Pld	W	D	L	GF	GA	GD	Pts	Qualification or relegation
1	Mureșul Toplița (Q)	22	20	0	2	85	11	+74	40	Qualification to championship final
2	Bastionul Lăzarea	22	14	6	2	57	17	+40	34	
3	Tricotop Toplița	22	12	3	7	32	24	+8	27	
4	Complexul Gălăuțaș	22	11	4	7	55	31	+24	26	
5	Mureșul Suseni	22	9	3	10	49	48	+1	21	
6	Bradul Hodoșa	22	7	7	8	36	45	−9	21	
7	Mobila Ditrău	22	7	5	10	37	38	−1	19	
8	Metalul Gheorgheni	22	7	4	11	43	49	−6	18	
9	Viață Nouă Remetea	22	5	6	11	36	55	−19	16	
10	Unirea Tulgheș	22	7	2	13	38	58	−20	16	
11	Apemin Borsec	22	7	2	13	33	60	−27	16	
12	Bucin Joseni	22	4	2	16	29	94	−65	10	

Rules for classification: 1) Points; 2) Goal difference; 3) Number of goals scored.
(Q) Qualified for the phase indicated

Series II

Pos	Team	Pld	W	D	L	GF	GA	GD	Pts	Qualification or relegation
1	Metalul Vlăhița (Q)	22	17	2	3	79	20	+59	36	Qualification to championship final
2	ASM Odorheiu Secuiesc	22	13	5	4	51	29	+22	31	
3	Unirea Cristuru Secuiesc	22	13	3	6	60	27	+33	29	
4	Flamura Roșie Sânsimion	22	11	5	6	56	27	+29	27	
5	Olimpia Miercurea Ciuc	22	12	2	8	41	40	+1	26	
6	Avântul Miercurea Ciuc	22	12	1	9	44	38	+6	25	
7	Șoimii IPL Băile Tușnad	22	10	3	9	50	58	−8	23	
8	Minerul Bălan II	22	9	1	12	52	48	+4	19	
9	Minerul Lueta	22	8	1	13	30	51	−21	17	
10	Rapid Porumbenii Mari	22	5	3	14	33	55	−22	13	
11	Minerul Praid	22	4	2	16	23	82	−59	10	
12	Rapid Ciceu	22	2	4	16	17	61	−44	8	

Rules for classification: 1) Points; 2) Goal difference; 3) Number of goals scored.
(Q) Qualified for the phase indicated

Championship final

Team 1	Agg.	Team 2	1st leg	2nd leg
Mureșul Toplița	6–2	Metalul Vlăhița	5–0	1–2

Mureșul Toplița won the Harghita County Championship and qualify for promotion play-off in Divizia C.

=== Hunedoara County ===
Pos	Team	Pld	W	D	L	GF	GA	GD	Pts	Qualification or relegation
1	Aurul Certej (C, Q)	28	16	9	3	69	24	+45	41	Qualification to promotion play-off
2	IMC Bârcea	28	18	3	7	61	26	+35	39	
3	Explorări Deva	28	17	5	6	67	35	+32	39	
4	Constructorul Hunedoara	28	13	10	5	56	28	+28	36	
5	Minerul Aninoasa	28	15	6	7	50	34	+16	36	
6	Auto Hațeg	28	13	6	9	53	34	+19	32	
7	Minerul Uricani	28	14	4	10	54	39	+15	32	
8	Parângul Lonea	28	12	7	9	47	40	+7	31	
9	Preparatorul Petrila	28	13	3	12	55	50	+5	29	
10	Minerul Paroșeni	28	10	6	12	35	40	−5	26	
11	IGCL Hunedoara	28	9	6	13	36	42	−6	24	
12	Metalul Crișcior	28	7	3	18	27	62	−35	17	
13	CFR Petroșani	28	7	2	19	43	88	−45	16	
14	Metalul Simeria	28	6	2	20	31	77	−46	14	
15	Energia Paroșeni	28	4	1	23	21	87	−66	9	

Rules for classification: 1) Points; 2) Goal difference; 3) Number of goals scored.
(C) Champions; (Q) Qualified for the phase indicated

=== Olt County ===
Pos	Team	Pld	W	D	L	GF	GA	GD	Pts	Qualification or relegation
1	Răsăritul Caracal (C, Q)	34	29	3	2	119	24	+95	61	Qualification to promotion play-off
2	Uzina de Vagoane Caracal	34	28	2	4	127	27	+100	58	
3	Rapid Piatra-Olt	33	20	2	11	98	52	+46	42	
4	Avântul Priseaca	34	19	2	13	76	60	+16	40	
5	Petrolul Iancu Jianu	34	16	3	15	72	63	+9	35	
6	Confecția Caracal	34	15	4	15	83	84	−1	34	
7	Vulturii Balș	33	16	2	15	60	74	−14	34	
8	Viitorul Orlea	34	15	2	17	73	83	−10	32	
9	Laminorul Slatina	34	13	5	16	65	68	−3	31	
10	Petrolul Potcoava	34	13	5	16	51	69	−18	31	
11	Metalul Corabia	34	14	2	18	62	75	−13	30	
12	Dârjovul Valea Mare	34	11	6	17	73	92	−19	28	
13	Recolta Vlădila	34	13	2	19	63	88	−25	28	
14	Viitorul Leotești	34	11	5	18	57	60	−3	27	
15	Voința Băbiciu	34	11	5	18	73	85	−12	27	
16	Avântul Vișina	34	11	4	19	65	120	−55	26	
17	Știința Drăgănești-Olt	34	9	7	18	53	68	−15	25	
18	Recolta Redea	34	7	7	20	41	119	−78	21	

Rules for classification: 1) Points; 2) Goal difference; 3) Number of goals scored.
(C) Champions; (Q) Qualified for the phase indicated

=== Prahova County ===
Pos	Team	Pld	W	D	L	GF	GA	GD	Pts	Qualification or relegation
1	ICIM Câmpina (C, Q)	30	22	4	4	75	21	+54	48	Qualification to promotion play-off
2	Electromotor Câmpina	30	19	8	3	81	17	+64	46	
3	Tricolorul Breaza	30	19	8	3	64	28	+36	46	
4	Minerul Filipeștii de Pădure	30	14	8	8	54	36	+18	36	
5	Chimistul Valea Călugărească	30	13	9	8	45	33	+12	35	
6	IUC Ploiești	30	14	6	10	52	37	+15	34	
7	Metalul Câmpina	30	10	9	11	47	44	+3	29	
8	Geamul Scăieni	30	13	3	14	45	44	+1	29	
9	PECO Ploiești	30	7	13	10	29	34	−5	27	
10	Rapid Mizil	30	10	5	15	41	51	−10	25	
11	Unirea Teleajen Ploiești	30	8	9	13	32	45	−13	25	
12	Tricolorul Negoiești	30	7	10	13	39	67	−28	24	
13	Dacia Ploiești (R)	30	8	6	16	28	45	−17	22	Relegation to Prahova County Championship II
14	Flamura Roșie Dorobanțul (R)	30	8	6	16	34	53	−19	22	Relegation to Prahova County Championship II
15	Carotajul Ploiești (R)	30	6	9	15	41	77	−36	21	Relegation to Prahova County Championship II
16	Cricovul Urlați (R)	30	3	5	22	24	99	−75	11	Relegation to Prahova County Championship II

Rules for classification: 1) Points; 2) Goal difference; 3) Number of goals scored.
(C) Champions; (Q) Qualified for the phase indicated; (R) Relegated

=== Sălaj County ===
Pos	Team	Pld	W	D	L	GF	GA	GD	Pts	Qualification or relegation
1	Viitorul Șimleu Silvaniei (C, Q)	26	21	3	2	80	16	+64	45	Qualification to promotion play-off
2	Victoria Elcond Zalău	26	20	5	1	77	17	+60	45	
3	Progresul Bălan	26	14	3	9	65	39	+26	31	
4	Energia Sânmihaiu Almașului	26	14	2	10	41	33	+8	30	
5	Gloria Șimleu Silvaniei	26	13	2	11	50	43	+7	28	
6	Unirea Hida	26	11	5	10	48	43	+5	27	
7	Minerul Sărmășag	26	12	2	12	45	46	−1	26	
8	Olimpic Bocșa	26	8	6	12	42	43	−1	22	
9	Tractorul Nușfalău	26	9	4	13	45	52	−7	22	
10	Silvania Cehu Silvaniei	26	9	3	14	47	59	−12	21	
11	Unirea Hereclean	26	8	4	14	31	51	−20	20	
12	Spartac Crasna	26	8	1	17	42	77	−35	17	
13	Minerul Surduc	26	7	2	17	37	78	−41	16	
14	Năzuința Tihău	26	7	0	19	24	77	−53	14	

Rules for classification: 1) Points; 2) Goal difference; 3) Number of goals scored.
(C) Champions; (Q) Qualified for the phase indicated

=== Sibiu County ===
Pos	Team	Pld	W	D	L	GF	GA	GD	Pts	Qualification or relegation
1	Construcții Sibiu (C, Q)	30	25	3	2	105	19	+86	53	Qualification to promotion play-off
2	Metalul IO Sibiu	30	25	3	2	82	19	+63	53	
3	Firul Roșu Tălmaciu	30	18	2	10	69	42	+27	38	
4	Vitrometan Mediaș	30	15	8	7	58	36	+22	38	
5	Sparta Mediaș	30	14	8	8	53	32	+21	36	
6	CSU Sibiu	30	17	1	12	69	52	+17	35	
7	Unirea Ocna Sibiului	30	14	5	11	45	39	+6	33	
8	Carbosin Copșa Mică	30	12	7	11	36	48	−12	31	
9	Record Mediaș	30	11	5	14	43	47	−4	27	
10	Metalurgica Sibiu	30	10	5	15	38	51	−13	25	
11	Recolta Alma	30	9	6	15	53	84	−31	24	
12	Textila Mediaș	30	8	6	16	32	45	−13	22	
13	Șantierul Sibiu	30	5	11	14	29	44	−15	21	
14	CFR Sibiu	30	8	5	17	39	73	−34	21	
15	Gloria Dumbrăveni	30	4	8	18	26	73	−47	16	
16	Electrica Sibiu (Note: Electrica Sibiu was excluded in the second part of the season and lost all remaining matches with 0–3.)	30	2	1	27	19	97	−78	5	

Rules for classification: 1) Points; 2) Goal difference; 3) Number of goals scored.
(C) Champions; (Q) Qualified for the phase indicated

=== Timiș County ===
Series I

Pos	Team	Pld	W	D	L	GF	GA	GD	Pts	Qualification or relegation
1	Electrotimiș Timișoara (Q)	32	20	7	5	85	26	+59	47	Qualification to championship final
2	Electrobanat Timișoara	32	20	7	5	75	24	+51	47	
3	Progresul Timișoara	32	15	10	7	70	24	+46	40	
4	Bega Belinț	32	16	7	9	58	50	+8	39	
5	Auto Timișoara	32	15	7	10	53	44	+9	37	
6	Șoimii Timișoara	32	12	10	10	49	34	+15	34	
7	Flacăra Făget	32	15	4	13	44	50	−6	34	
8	Modern Timișoara	32	13	5	14	49	37	+12	31	
9	Avântul Chizătău	32	13	4	15	64	82	−18	30	
10	Chimia Margina	32	12	5	15	49	69	−20	29	
11	SC Buziaș	32	11	5	16	56	61	−5	27	
12	Comerțul Lugoj	32	12	2	18	65	78	−13	26	
13	FZ Banatul Timișoara	32	11	4	17	46	59	−13	26	
14	Șoimii Buziaș	32	10	6	16	43	63	−20	26	
15	Timișul Șag	32	10	5	17	43	72	−29	25	
16	Înainte Moșnița	32	8	7	17	32	68	−36	23	
17	Victoria Carani	32	9	5	18	29	69	−40	23	

Rules for classification: 1) Points; 2) Goal difference; 3) Number of goals scored.
(Q) Qualified for the phase indicated

Series II

Pos	Team	Pld	W	D	L	GF	GA	GD	Pts	Qualification or relegation
1	ICRAL Timișoara (Q)	34	25	6	3	86	27	+59	56	Qualification to championship final
2	Furnirul Deta	34	21	6	7	74	24	+50	48	
3	IAEM Timișoara	34	19	8	7	69	30	+39	46	
4	Ceramica Jimbolia	34	18	3	13	79	42	+37	39	
5	Tehnolemn Timișoara	34	18	3	13	70	62	+8	39	
6	Obilici Sânmartinu Sârbesc	34	16	5	13	62	53	+9	37	
7	13 Construcții Timișoara	33	16	3	14	61	58	+3	35	
8	Flacăra Parța	34	14	5	15	72	57	+15	33	
9	Pobeda Dudeștii Vechi	33	12	6	15	46	63	−17	30	
10	Unirea Peciu Nou	34	13	3	18	78	73	+5	29	
11	Voința Sânnicolau Mare	34	13	3	18	56	56	0	29	
12	Progresul Gătaia	34	12	4	18	52	75	−23	28	
13	Voința Șandra	34	13	2	19	62	98	−36	28	
14	Progresul Ciacova	34	12	4	18	56	96	−40	28	
15	Mănușarul Timișoara	34	12	3	19	48	59	−11	27	
16	Checeana Checea	34	11	4	19	47	68	−21	26	
17	Textila Timișoara	34	8	10	16	28	71	−43	26	
18	Unirea Breștea	34	12	2	20	61	96	−35	26	

Rules for classification: 1) Points; 2) Goal difference; 3) Number of goals scored.
(Q) Qualified for the phase indicated

Championship final

The matches were played on 18 and 21 June 1978 at UMT Stadium in Timișoara.

Team 1	Agg.	Team 2	1st leg	2nd leg
Electrotimiș Timișoara	3–7	ICRAL Timișoara	2–2	1–5 (a.e.t.)

ICRAL Timișoara won the Timiș County Championship and qualify for promotion play-off in Divizia C.

=== Vâlcea County ===
Pos	Team	Pld	W	D	L	GF	GA	GD	Pts	Qualification or relegation
1	Bistrița Băbeni (C, Q)	26	20	3	3	87	14	+73	43	Qualification to promotion play-off
2	Cauciucul Drăgășani	26	17	7	2	81	18	+63	41	
3	Râureni	26	16	5	5	60	27	+33	37	
4	Cozia Călimănești	26	14	6	6	46	36	+10	34	
5	Flacăra Horezu	26	13	6	7	52	25	+27	32	
6	Oltul CIL Râmnicu Vâlcea	26	14	2	10	63	34	+29	30	
7	Hidro Râmnicu Vâlcea	26	10	4	12	47	45	+2	24	
8	Voința Horezu	26	9	6	11	43	48	−5	24	
9	Oltețul Bălcești	26	10	4	12	50	59	−9	24	
10	Sănătatea Govora	26	8	6	12	39	51	−12	22	
11	Spicul Sutești	26	8	6	12	33	57	−24	22	
12	Constructorul Govora	26	6	3	17	45	105	−60	15	
13	Comerțul Râmnicu Vâlcea	26	6	2	18	35	64	−29	14	
14	Constructorul Râmnicu Vâlcea	26	2	1	23	33	131	−98	5	

Rules for classification: 1) Points; 2) Goal difference; 3) Number of goals scored.
(C) Champions; (Q) Qualified for the phase indicated

== See also ==
- 1977–78 Divizia A
- 1977–78 Divizia B
- 1977–78 Divizia C
- 1977–78 Cupa României
