= Daniel Mogoșanu =

Romanian footballer and manager

Daniel Mogoşanu
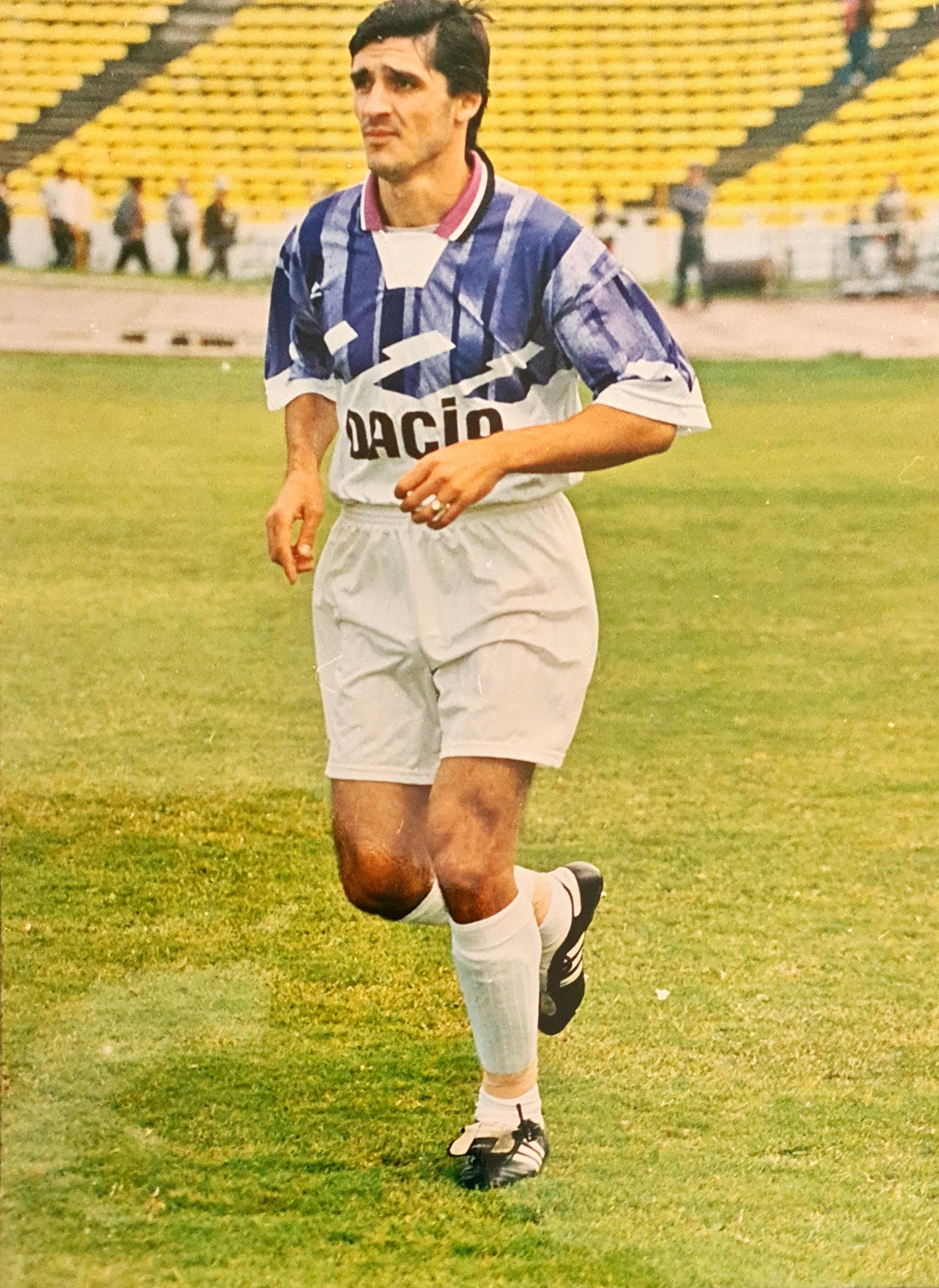
- Daniel Mogoşanu 2021

Personal information
- Full name: Daniel Emil Mogoşanu
- Date of birth: 1 December 1967 (age 58)
- Place of birth: Craiova, Romania
- Height: 1.78 m (5 ft 10 in)
- Positions: Right back; right midfielder

Team information
- Current team: Romania U-16 (manager)

Senior career*
Years	Team	Apps	(Gls)
1988–1989	FCM Caracal		
1989–1991	Universitatea Craiova	31	(2)
1991–1995	FC U Craiova	116	(8)
1995–1996	Oțelul Galați	30	(2)
1996–2000	Argeș Pitești	93	(3)
Total		270	(15)

Managerial career
- 2008: Primăvara Craiova
- 2008–2009: FC Caracal
- 2009: FC U Craiova
- 2009–2010: FC Caracal
- 2011–2012: Alro Slatina
- 2014–2015: Universitatea II Craiova
- 2016: Universitatea Craiova (technical director)
- 2017–2023: Romania U-16
- 2023–: Universitatea Craiova U-17
- * Club domestic league appearances and goals

Daniel Emil Mogoşanu (born 1 December 1967) is a Romanian football manager and former player.

== Honours ==
- Liga I (1): 1990–91
- Cupa României (2): 1990–91, 1992–93
