= Dumitru Mitriță =

Romanian footballer

Personal information
- Full name: Dumitru Dorian Mitriță
- Date of birth: 23 June 1971 (age 55)
- Place of birth: Craiova, Romania
- Height: 1.68 m (5 ft 6 in)
- Position: Defender

Senior career*
Years	Team	Apps	(Gls)
1990	CS Universitatea Craiova	2	(0)
1991	Drobeta-Turnu Severin		
1991–1992	Electroputere Craiova	42	(4)
1993	FC Universitatea Craiova	6	(1)
1993	Farul Constanța	4	(0)
1994	Electroputere Craiova	7	(0)
1994–1997	FC Universitatea Craiova	81	(1)
1997–2000	Heerenveen	83	(5)
2000–2003	Steaua București	35	(1)
2003–2004	FC Craiova	11	(2)
Total		271	(14)

International career
1999	Romania	1	(0)
- * Club domestic league appearances and goals

Dumitru Dorian Mitriță (born 23 June 1971) is a retired Romanian footballer who played as a defender.

== Club career ==
Mitriță was born on 23 June 1971 in Craiova, Romania and began playing-junior level football at local club Universitatea, where he won two national junior championships in 1988 and 1991. He made his Divizia A debut under coach Sorin Cârțu on 29 September 1990 in "U" Craiova's 1–0 win over Universitatea Cluj. However, he was transferred in the middle of the season to Divizia B club Drobeta-Turnu Severin, but Universitatea still managed to win The Double at the end of the season without him. Subsequently, Mitriță returned to top-flight football, signing with Electroputere Craiova. There, he made his debut in European competitions, playing in both legs of the 10–0 aggregate loss to Panathinaikos in the first round of the 1992–93 UEFA Cup. In the middle of that season, he joined FC Universitatea Craiova.

Mitriță started the 1993–94 season at Farul Constanța, but finished it by playing for Electroputere Craiova. From 1994 to 1997, he played for FC Universitatea Craiova. In 1997, Mitriță went to play for Heerenveen where he became teammates with compatriots Florin Constantinovici and Mugur Gușatu, and a young Ruud van Nistelrooy. He made his Eredivisie debut on 20 August 1997 under coach Foppe de Haan in a 3–1 home win over NAC Breda. Mitriță scored his first goal in the competition on 24 September in a 2–1 home victory against Twente. Afterwards, he played three games in the 1998–99 Cup Winners' Cup, scoring a goal as Heerenveen got past Amica Wronki in the first round, but they got defeated in the following round by Varteks. In the 1999–2000 season, he helped the club finish runner-up in the league.

Mitriță joined Steaua București in 2000, making 14 league appearances under coach Victor Pițurcă in his first season, as they won the title. Subsequently, he played four matches in the 2001–02 Champions League qualifying rounds, helping them get past Sloga Jugomagnat, but they got eliminated in the following round by Dynamo Kyiv. He made his last Divizia A appearance on 19 May 2002 in Steaua's 2–2 derby draw against Dinamo București, totaling 177 games with seven goals in the competition and 22 games with one goal in European competitions (including seven appearances in the Intertoto Cup). Mitriță ended his career after playing during the 2003–04 Divizia B season for FC Craiova.

== International career ==
Mitriță played one friendly game for Romania on 3 March 1999 under coach Victor Pițurcă in a 2–0 victory against Estonia.

== Personal life ==
His nephew, Alexandru, is also a professional footballer.

== Honours ==
Universitatea Craiova

- Divizia A: 1990–91
- Cupa României: 1990–91

Heerenveen

- Eredivisie runner-up: 1999–2000

Steaua București

- Divizia A: 2000–01
