= Roland Agalliu =

Albanian footballer

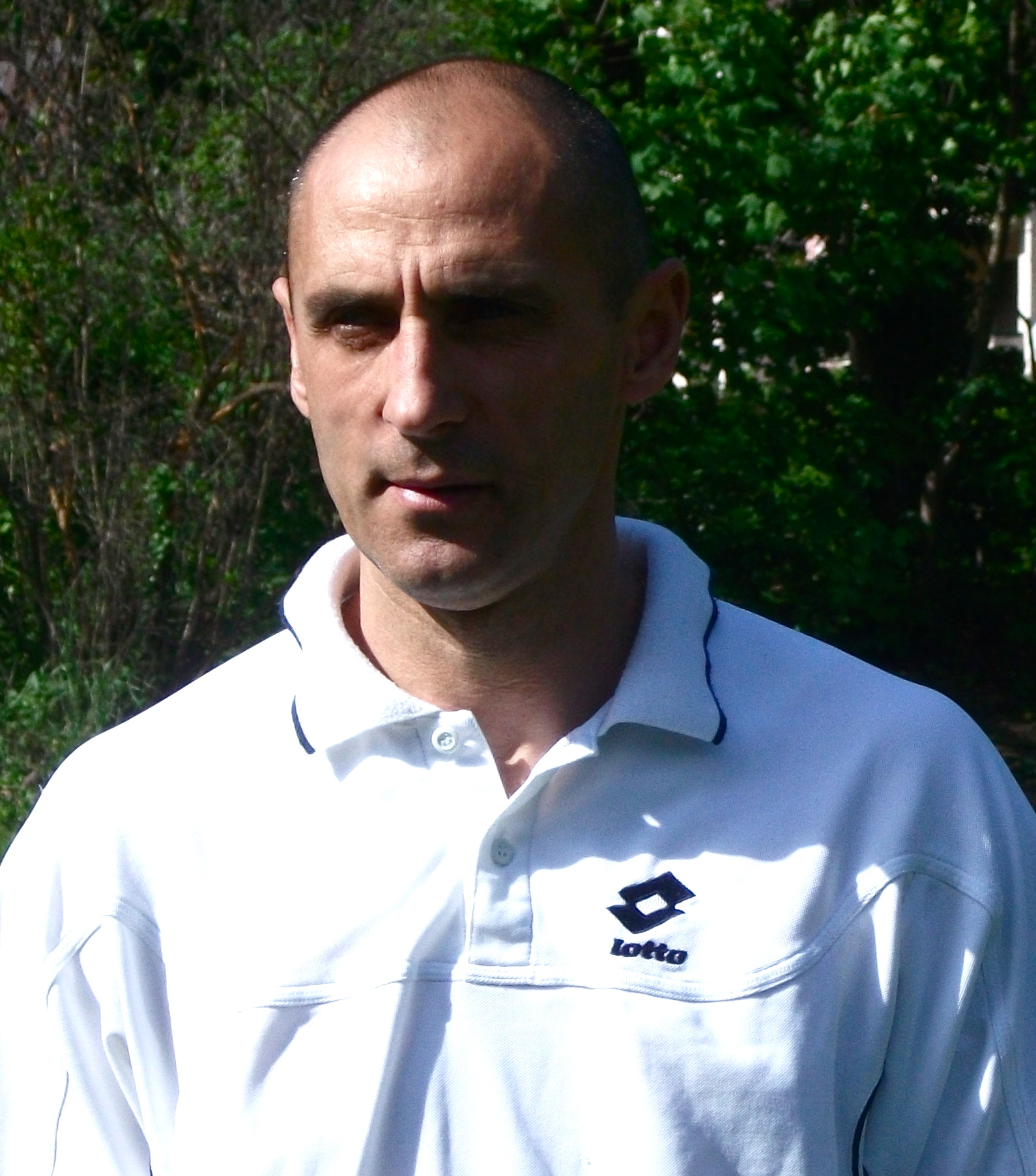
- Agalliu in 2010

Personal information
- Full name: Roland Agalliu
- Date of birth: 5 July 1961 (age 65)
- Place of birth: Tirana, Albania
- Position: Striker

Senior career*
| Years | Team | Apps | (Gls) |
| 1982–1983 | Dinamo Tirana | | |
| 1983–1985 | Labinoti | | |
| 1985–1990 | Partizani Tirana | | |
| 1991–1992 | Universitatea Craiova | 18 | (3) |
| 1992–1993 | Oţelul Galați | 21 | (1) |
| Total | | 39 | (4) |
Medal record
Universitatea Craiova
| Winner | Romanian Cup | 1991 |
- * Club domestic league appearances and goals as of 23 August 2010

Roland Agalliu (born 5 July 1961) is an Albanian retired football player. He was the first foreigner to play in the Romanian First League after the Romanian Revolution.

== Honours ==
Labinoti

- Albanian Superliga: 1983–84

Partizani Tirana

- Albanian Superliga: 1986–87

Universitatea Craiova

- Divizia A: 1990–91
- Cupa României: 1990–91

== Personal ==
Roland currently resides in Graz, Austria with his spouse and daughter.
