= Gheorghe Dungu =

Romanian footballer (1929–2023)

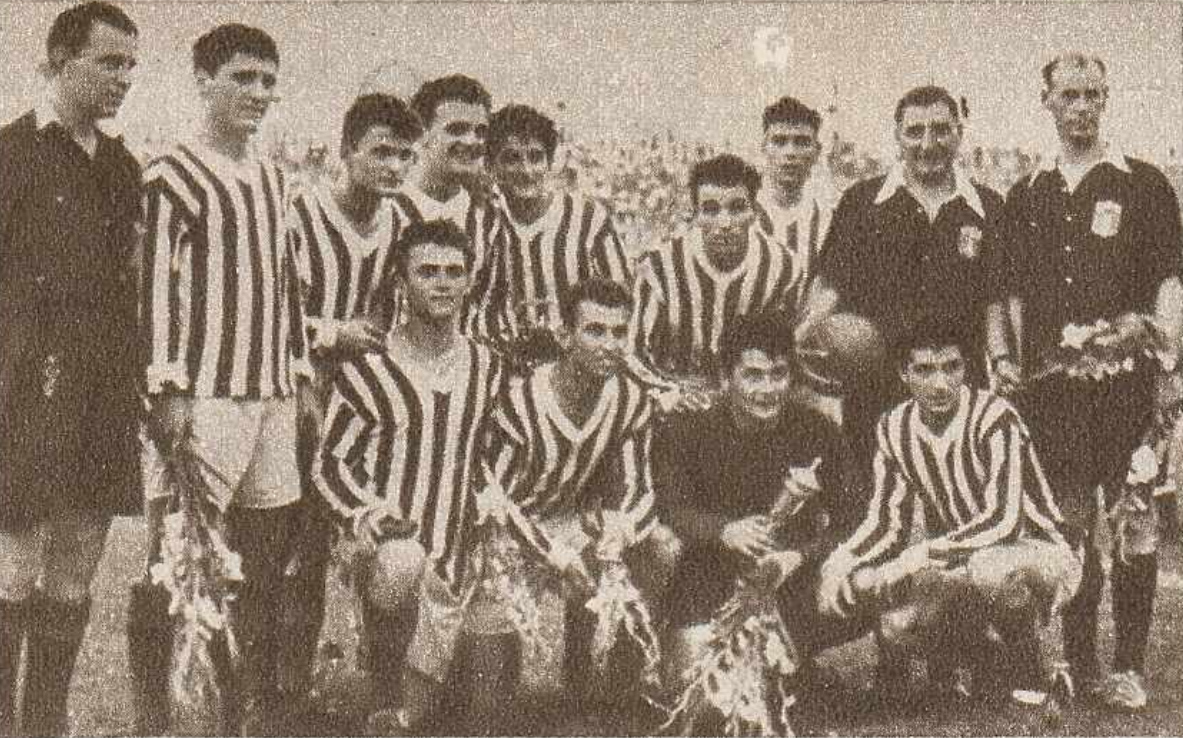
- Dungu (bottom row, centre) with the Cupa Primăverii trophy in 1957.

Personal information
- Date of birth: 5 April 1929
- Place of birth: Bucharest, Romania
- Date of death: 15 June 2023 (aged 94)
- Place of death: Bucharest, Romania
- Position: Goalkeeper

Senior career*
Years	Team	Apps	(Gls)
1946–1947	Explosivi Făgăraș		
1947–1948	CFR Făgăraș		
1948–1963	Rapid București	170	(0)
1963–1964	Progresul Alexandria		

International career
1955–1958	Romania B	6	(0)
1962	Romania	2	(0)

Managerial career
- 1963–1964: Progresul Alexandria
- 1964–1965: Chimia Făgăraș
- 1965–1966: Metalurgistul Cugir
- 1966–1967: Oțelul Galați
- 1967–1972: Steaua București (juniors)
- 1972–1974: Zanzibar
- 1974–1975: Electroputere Craiova
- 1975–1976: Dinamo Slatina
- 1976–1977: Unirea Alexandria
- 1980–1982: Laminorul Roman
- 1982–1983: Rova Roșiori
- 1983–1984: Sportul Muncitoresc Caracal
- 1984–1985: Rapid București (juniors)
- 1985–1986: Rapid București (assistant)
- 1986–1987: Rapid București (juniors)
- 1988: Sportul Muncitoresc Caracal
- 1989: Rapid București (juniors)
- * Club domestic league appearances and goals

Gheorghe Dungu (5 April 1929 – 15 June 2023) was a Romanian football player and manager.

== Club career ==
Dungu was born on 5 April 1929 in Bucharest, Romania, and when he was six years old his family moved to Făgăraș. He started playing football at Explosivi Făgăraș, first as a forward. At the age of 15 or 16 in a match against Metrom Brașov, the team's goalkeeper got injured and he replaced him, saving a penalty in the game, coach Andrei Sepci deciding to definitely keep him in the goalkeeper position from then on. In 1947, Dungu went to play for CFR Făgăraș, where he was noticed by Rapid București's player Remus Ghiurițan who recommended him to the team's officials. He went on a trial at Rapid and after playing three matches in which he kept a clean sheet, coach Petre Steinbach decided to keep him at the team. Dungu made his Divizia A debut for The Railwaymen on 4 March 1949 in a 3–0 victory against Metalul Reșița. He stayed with the club until the end of his career in 1963, totaling 170 Divizia A appearances, and was described as "one of the most appreciated goalkeepers" of Rapid. The highlights of his career were winning the 1957 Cupa Primăverii and two runner-up positions in the 1948–49 and 1950 Divizia A seasons. He also helped Rapid reach two Cupa României finals in 1961 and 1962 under coach Ion Mihăilescu which were lost to Arieșul Turda and Steaua București, respectively.

== International career ==
Dungu played two friendly games for Romania, making his debut on 30 September 1962 in a 4–0 victory against Morocco, as coach Constantin Teașcă used him in the first 80 minutes, being replaced for the last 10 by Vasile Sfetcu. In the second game which took place on 14 October 1962, Teașcă played him the entire match in the 3–2 away loss to East Germany.

== Managerial career ==
Dungu coached several teams in the Romanian lower leagues, the first one being Progresul Alexandria in 1963. He had a spell abroad as the national team of Zanzibar's coach from 1972 until 1974. He also worked at junior level at the youth centers of Steaua București and Rapid București, and in the 1985–86 Divizia A season he was the assistant of Ion Motroc at Rapid.

== Personal life ==
Dungu was married to Silvia Popescu. He died on 15 June 2023 at age 94.

== Honours ==
Rapid București

- Divizia A runner-up: 1948–49, 1950
- Cupa României runner-up: 1960–61, 1961–62
- Cupa Primăverii: 1957
