= 1961–62 Regional Championship =

20th season of the Liga IV, the fourth tier of the Romanian football league

Liga IV
- Season: 1961–62

The 1961–62 Regional Championship was the 20th season of the Regional Championship, 9th as the third tier of Romanian football. The champions of each regional championships play against each other in the play-offs to gain promotion to Divizia B.

== Regional championships ==
- Argeș (AG)
- Bacău (BC)
- Banat (BA)
- Brașov (BV)
- Bucharest Municipality (B)
- Bucharest Region (B)
- Cluj (CJ)
- Crișana (CR)
- Dobrogea (DO)
- Galați (GL)
- Hunedoara (HD)
- Iași (IS)
- Maramureș (MM)
- Mureș (MS)
- Oltenia (OL)
- Ploiești (PL)
- Suceava (SV)

== Promotion play-off ==
Seventeen teams participate in the promotion tournament. The teams were divided into two groups of six and one of five, and the first two ranked teams from each group promoted to second division. The matches were played on neutral ground at Râmnicu Vâlcea, Piatra Neamț and Mediaș.

=== Series I (Râmnicu Vâlcea) ===
Table

Pos	Team	Pld	W	D	L	GF	GA	GD	Pts	Qualification
1	IMU Medgidia (DO) (P)	4	3	0	1	11	5	+6	6	Promotion to Divizia B
2	Flamura Roșie Tecuci (GL) (P)	4	3	0	1	8	5	+3	6	Promotion to Divizia B
3	Moldova Iași (IS)	4	2	0	2	11	10	+1	4	
4	Textila Buhuși (BC)	4	1	0	3	4	8	−4	2	
5	Unirea Botoșani (SV)	4	1	0	3	5	11	−6	2	

Rules for classification: 1) points; 2) goal difference; 3) number of goals scored.
(P) Promoted

Results

8 July 1962	Flamura Roșie Tecuci	2–0	Unirea Botoșani	Râmnicu Vâlcea

8 July 1962	IMU Medgidia	4–1	Textila Buhuși	Râmnicu Vâlcea

12 July 1962	Moldova Iași	1–0	Textila Buhuși	Râmnicu Vâlcea

12 July 1962	IMU Medgidia	2–1	Unirea Botoșani	Râmnicu Vâlcea

15 July 1962	Unirea Botoșani	2–0	Textila Buhuși	Râmnicu Vâlcea

15 July 1962	Flamura Roșie Tecuci	4–2	Moldova Iași	Râmnicu Vâlcea

19 July 1962	IMU Medgidia	5–1	Moldova Iași	Râmnicu Vâlcea

19 July 1962	Textila Buhuși	3–0	Flamura Roșie Tecuci	Râmnicu Vâlcea

22 July 1962	Unirea Botoșani	1–7	Moldova Iași	Râmnicu Vâlcea

22 July 1962	Flamura Roșie Tecuci	2–0	IMU Medgidia	Râmnicu Vâlcea

=== Series II (Piatra Neamț) ===
Table

Pos	Team	Pld	W	D	L	GF	GA	GD	Pts	Qualification
1	Progresul Alexandria (B) (P)	5	3	1	1	9	5	+4	7	Promotion to Divizia B
2	Drobeta Turnu Severin (OT)	5	3	0	2	13	5	+8	6	Promotion to Divizia B
3	Metalul Pitești (AG)	5	3	0	2	11	5	+6	6	
4	Rulmentul Brașov (BV)	5	2	2	1	5	4	+1	6	
5	Filaret București (B)	5	2	1	2	8	15	−7	5	
6	Rapid Plopeni (PL)	5	0	0	5	0	12	−12	0	

Rules for classification: 1) points; 2) goal difference; 3) number of goals scored.
(P) Promoted

Results

8 July 1962	Drobeta Turnu Severin	1–0	Rapid Plopeni	Piatra Neamț

8 July 1962	Progresul Alexandria	4–2	Filaret București	Piatra Neamț

8 July 1962	Rulmentul Brașov	1–0	Metalul Pitești	Piatra Neamț

11 July 1962	Progresul Alexandria	1–0	Drobeta Turnu Severin	Piatra Neamț

12 July 1962	Rulmentul Brașov	2–0	Rapid Plopeni	Piatra Neamț

12 July 1962	Filaret București	2–1	Metalul Pitești	Piatra Neamț

15 July 1962	Metalul Pitești	2–1	Progresul Alexandria	Piatra Neamț

15 July 1962	Drobeta Turnu Severin	2–0	Rulmentul Brașov	Piatra Neamț

15 July 1962	Filaret București	2–0	Rapid Plopeni	Piatra Neamț

19 July 1962	Metalul Pitești	3–1	Drobeta Turnu Severin	Piatra Neamț

19 July 1962	Filaret București	1–1	Rulmentul Brașov	Piatra Neamț

19 July 1962	Rapid Plopeni	0–2	Progresul Alexandria	Piatra Neamț

22 July 1962	Rulmentul Brașov	1–1	Progresul Alexandria	Piatra Neamț

22 July 1962	Drobeta Turnu Severin	9–1	Filaret București	Piatra Neamț

22 July 1962	Metalul Pitești	5–0	Rapid Plopeni	Piatra Neamț

=== Series III (Mediaș) ===
Table

Pos	Team	Pld	W	D	L	GF	GA	GD	Pts	Qualification
1	Cugir (HD) (P)	5	4	1	0	16	5	+11	9	Promotion to Divizia B
2	Unirea Dej (CJ) (P)	5	2	2	1	11	8	+3	6	Promotion to Divizia B
3	Ceramica Jimbolia (BA)	5	2	2	1	7	10	−3	6	
4	Avântul Reghin (MS)	5	2	1	2	7	7	0	5	
5	Voința Oradea (CR)	5	1	1	3	8	10	−2	3	
6	Minerul Baia Sprie (MM)	5	0	1	4	7	16	−9	1	

Rules for classification: 1) points; 2) goal difference; 3) number of goals scored.
(P) Promoted

Results

8 July 1962	Unirea Dej	0–0	Ceramica Jimbolia	Mediaș

8 July 1962	Avântul Reghin	2–1	Minerul Baia Sprie	Mediaș

8 July 1962	Cugir	2–2	Voința Oradea	Mediaș

11 July 1962	Voința Oradea	3–0	Minerul Baia Sprie	Mediaș

12 July 1962	Cugir	6–1	Ceramica Jimbolia	Mediaș

12 July 1962	Unirea Dej	3–0	Avântul Reghin	Mediaș

15 July 1962	Cugir	1–0	Avântul Reghin	Mediaș

15 July 1962	Unirea Dej	3–3	Minerul Baia Sprie	Mediaș

15 July 1962	Ceramica Jimbolia	1–0	Voința Oradea	Mediaș

19 July 1962	Cugir	3–0	Minerul Baia Sprie	Mediaș

19 July 1962	Avântul Reghin	1–1	Ceramica Jimbolia	Mediaș

19 July 1962	Unirea Dej	3–1	Voința Oradea	Mediaș

22 July 1962	Unirea Dej	4–2	Cugir	Mediaș

22 July 1962	Ceramica Jimbolia	4–3	Minerul Baia Sprie	Mediaș

22 July 1962	Voința Oradea	2–4	Avântul Reghin	Mediaș

== Championships standings ==
=== Argeș Region ===
Series I

Pos	Team	Pld	W	D	L	GF	GA	GD	Pts	Qualification or relegation
1	Metalul Pitești (Q)	20	17	2	1	79	14	+65	36	Qualification to championship final
2	Minerul Câmpulung	20	12	6	2	50	17	+33	30	
3	Forestierul Stâlpeni	20	11	3	6	48	34	+14	25	
4	Muscelul UMM Câmpulung	20	10	3	7	48	22	+26	23	
5	Progresul Băiculești	20	9	4	7	38	40	−2	22	
6	ASVP Găești (Note: Victoria Găești and Progresul Găești merged before the second half of the season to form ASVP Găești.)	20	9	2	9	30	47	−17	20	
7	Industria Textilă Pitești - Finanțe (Note: Textilistul Pitești and Moneda Pitești merged in October 1961 to form Industria Textilă Pitești-Finanțe.)	20	7	3	10	39	39	0	17	
8	Rapid Pitești	20	6	5	9	24	35	−11	17	
9	Argeșul Curtea de Argeș	20	7	1	12	30	53	−23	15	
10	Unirea Costești	20	4	4	12	25	51	−26	12	
11	Petrolul Vedea	20	1	1	18	8	63	−55	3	
12	Progresul Găești	0	0	0	0	0	0	0	0	Disbanded
13	Moneda Pitești (D)	0	0	0	0	0	0	0	0	Disbanded

Rules for classification: 1) points; 2) goal difference; 3) number of goals scored.
(D) Disqualified; (Q) Qualified for the phase indicated
Notes:

Series II

Pos	Team	Pld	W	D	L	GF	GA	GD	Pts	Qualification or relegation
1	Rapid Piatra-Olt (Q)	24	18	3	3	65	32	+33	39	Qualification to championship final
2	Oltul Slatina	24	15	2	7	65	38	+27	32	
3	Lotru Brezoi	24	12	6	6	50	39	+11	30	
4	Victoria Slatina	24	13	3	8	61	39	+22	29	
5	Oltul Drăgănești-Olt	24	12	4	8	56	35	+21	28	
6	Unirea Drăgășani	24	11	6	7	58	39	+19	28	
7	Oltul Râmnicu Vâlcea	24	12	3	9	53	37	+16	27	
8	Recolta Stoicănești	24	10	5	9	68	52	+16	25	
9	Autobuzul Slatina	24	10	3	11	50	53	−3	23	
10	CSA Râmnicu Vâlcea	24	8	3	13	46	52	−6	19	
11	Unirea Horezu	24	6	3	15	36	73	−37	15	
12	Petrolul Potcoava	24	2	7	15	26	89	−63	11	
13	Farul Drăgășani	24	2	2	20	23	79	−56	6	

Rules for classification: 1) points; 2) goal difference; 3) number of goals scored.
(Q) Qualified for the phase indicated

Championship final

Team 1	Agg.	Team 2	1st leg	2nd leg
Metalul Pitești	12–1	Rapid Piatra-Olt	11–1	1–0

Metalul Pitești won the Argeș Regional Championship and qualify for promotion play-off in Divizia B.

=== Bacău Region ===
Series I

Pos	Team	Pld	W	D	L	GF	GA	GD	Pts	Qualification or relegation
1	Laminorul Roman (C, Q)	15	11	2	2	36	11	+25	24	Qualification to championship final
2	Celuloza Piatra Neamț	15	9	1	5	21	18	+3	19	
3	Bradul Roznov	16	7	4	5	30	18	+12	18	
4	Cetatea Târgu Neamț	16	5	8	3	17	13	+4	18	
5	Bradul HCC Bacău	16	5	7	4	21	16	+5	17	
6	Victoria Piatra Neamț	16	6	4	6	18	16	+2	16	
7	Victoria Roman	16	5	5	6	19	15	+4	15	
8	Partizanul Bacău	16	4	2	10	13	30	−17	10	
9	Cimentul Bicaz	16	2	2	12	10	48	−38	6	

Rules for classification: 1) points; 2) goal difference; 3) number of goals scored.
(C) Champions; (Q) Qualified for the phase indicated

Series II

Pos	Team	Pld	W	D	L	GF	GA	GD	Pts	Qualification or relegation
1	Textila Buhuși (C, Q)	14	12	1	1	45	15	+30	25	Qualification to championship final
2	Oituz Târgu Ocna	14	9	3	2	35	15	+20	21	
3	Moldova Moinești	14	5	5	4	25	21	+4	15	
4	Chimia Onești	13	5	2	6	21	18	+3	12	
5	Minerul Comănești	13	4	4	5	19	23	−4	12	
6	Victoria Bacău	14	3	3	8	17	29	−12	9	
7	Petrolistul Dărmănești	13	3	2	8	16	39	−23	8	
8	Locomotiva Adjud	13	3	0	10	14	31	−17	6	

Rules for classification: 1) points; 2) goal difference; 3) number of goals scored.
(C) Champions; (Q) Qualified for the phase indicated

Championship final

The matches was played on 3 and 10 June 1962.

Team 1	Agg.	Team 2	1st leg	2nd leg
Textila Buhuși	4–1	Laminorul Roman	3–0	1–1

Textila Buhuși won the Bacău Regional Championship and qualify to promotion play-off in Divizia B.

=== Bucharest Municipality ===
Series I

Pos	Team	Pld	W	D	L	GF	GA	GD	Pts	Qualification or relegation
1	Filaret București (Q)	22	11	7	4	39	20	+19	29	Qualification to championship final
2	Flacăra Roșie București	22	9	10	3	38	20	+18	28	
3	Abatorul București	22	10	7	5	34	21	+13	27	
4	TUG București	22	10	6	6	21	18	+3	26	
5	Vestitorul București	22	9	5	8	20	21	−1	23	
6	Bumbacul București	22	6	9	7	38	31	+7	21	
7	Voința București	22	7	7	8	27	26	+1	21	
8	ICAB București	22	4	12	6	24	26	−2	20	
9	Icar București	22	8	4	10	30	38	−8	20	
10	Quadrat București	22	4	9	9	21	34	−13	17	
11	Ulei București	22	5	7	10	21	45	−24	17	
12	Timpuri Noi București	22	5	5	12	23	36	−13	15	

Rules for classification: 1) points; 2) goal difference; 3) number of goals scored.
(Q) Qualified for the phase indicated

Series II

Pos	Team	Pld	W	D	L	GF	GA	GD	Pts	Qualification or relegation
1	Tehnometal București (Q)	22	14	6	2	53	21	+32	34	Qualification to championship final
2	Autobuzul București	22	14	3	5	40	28	+12	31	
3	Petrolul București	22	12	4	6	43	29	+14	28	
4	Gloria București	22	11	5	6	40	40	0	27	
5	FRB București	22	10	5	7	41	23	+18	25	
6	Vulcan București	22	9	5	8	45	43	+2	23	
7	Chimia București	22	7	6	9	32	34	−2	20	
8	Confecția București	22	8	4	10	25	38	−13	20	
9	Laminorul București	22	6	7	9	26	33	−7	19	
10	Metalul Floreasca	22	6	2	14	31	41	−10	14	
11	Sirena București	22	5	4	13	29	44	−15	14	
12	Unirea București	22	3	3	16	26	58	−32	9	

Rules for classification: 1) points; 2) goal difference; 3) number of goals scored.
(Q) Qualified for the phase indicated

Championship final

The matches was played on 17 and 24 June 1962 at Giulești Stadium.

Team 1	Agg.	Team 2	1st leg	2nd leg
Tehnometal București	1–2	Filaret București	1–1	0–1

Filaret București won the Bucharest Municipal Championship and qualify to promotion play-off in Divizia B.

=== Dobrogea Region ===
Pos	Team	Pld	W	D	L	GF	GA	GD	Pts	Qualification or relegation
1	IMU Medgidia (C, Q)	26	21	2	3	70	20	+50	44	Qualification to promotion play-off
2	Spartac Constanța	26	15	5	6	53	30	+23	35	
3	Callatis Mangalia	26	15	3	8	44	42	+2	33	
4	Electrica Constanța	26	12	6	8	53	39	+14	30	
5	Ideal Cernavodă	26	10	9	7	44	25	+19	29	
6	Marina Constanța	26	12	5	9	58	39	+19	29	
7	Cimentul Medgidia	26	13	1	12	48	36	+12	27	
8	CFR Constanța	26	8	9	9	49	42	+7	25	
9	Răsăritul Sulina	26	11	3	12	35	38	−3	25	
10	Stuful Tulcea	26	9	4	13	33	46	−13	22	
11	Victoria Saligny	26	6	8	12	40	41	−1	20	
12	Recolta Negru Vodă	26	7	6	13	51	70	−19	20	
13	Dinamo Constanța (R)	26	6	6	14	32	57	−25	18	Relegation to Dobrogea District Championship
14	Cetatea Istria Babadag (R)	26	2	3	21	24	111	−87	7	Relegation to Dobrogea District Championship

Rules for classification: 1) points; 2) goal difference; 3) number of goals scored.
(C) Champions; (Q) Qualified for the phase indicated; (R) Relegated

=== Galați Region ===
Series I

Pos	Team	Pld	W	D	L	GF	GA	GD	Pts	Qualification or relegation
1	Metalosport Galați (Q)	24	19	4	1	68	23	+45	42	Qualification to championship final
2	Marina Brăila	24	19	1	4	68	13	+55	39	
3	Ancora Galați	24	18	3	3	66	17	+49	39	
4	Dunărea Brăila	24	12	2	10	39	34	+5	26	
5	Avântul Bujor	24	12	2	10	43	45	−2	26	
6	Tractorul Nănești	24	11	2	11	50	42	+8	24	
7	Mecanizatorul Făurei	23	10	4	9	40	34	+6	24	
8	Celuloza Brăila	24	8	5	11	32	44	−12	21	
9	Tractorul Viziru	24	6	5	13	25	37	−12	17	
10	Unirea Cioara	23	5	5	13	14	36	−22	15	
11	Tractorul Balta Albă	23	5	3	15	28	63	−35	13	
12	Voința Rușețu	23	5	2	16	33	56	−23	12	
13	Recolta Ianca	24	4	4	16	25	80	−55	12	
14	PAL Brăila (Note: PAL Brăila withdrew during the season and all its results were canceled.) (D)	0	0	0	0	0	0	0	0	Withdrew

Rules for classification: 1) points; 2) goal difference; 3) number of goals scored.
(D) Disqualified; (Q) Qualified for the phase indicated
Notes:

Series II

Pos	Team	Pld	W	D	L	GF	GA	GD	Pts	Qualification or relegation
1	Flamura Roșie Tecuci (Q)	26	20	4	2	97	18	+79	44	Qualification to championship final
2	Progresul Brăila	26	18	5	3	87	15	+72	41	
3	Laminorul Brăila	26	17	3	6	64	33	+31	37	
4	Gloria CFR Galați	26	12	10	4	52	29	+23	34	
5	Victoria Gugești	26	15	4	7	47	35	+12	34	
6	Voința Focșani	26	11	7	8	51	38	+13	29	
7	Muncitorul Ghidigeni	26	12	5	9	53	37	+16	29	
8	Chimica Mărășești	26	11	4	11	40	39	+1	26	
9	Muncitorul Tecuci	26	8	7	11	38	52	−14	23	
10	Recolta Ivești	26	7	4	15	25	69	−44	18	
11	Viticultorul Panciu	26	7	3	16	34	64	−30	17	
12	Recolta Măicănești	26	6	3	17	21	55	−34	15	
13	Combinatul Galați	26	4	5	17	26	71	−45	13	
14	Flacăra Odobești	26	2	0	24	18	95	−77	4	

Rules for classification: 1) points; 2) goal difference; 3) number of goals scored.
(Q) Qualified for the phase indicated

Championship final

The matches was played on 21 and 24 June 1962.

Team 1	Agg.	Team 2	1st leg	2nd leg
Flamura Roșie Tecuci	4–1	Metalosport Galați	2–0	2–1

Flamura Roșie Tecuci won the Galați Regional Championship and qualify to promotion play-off in Divizia B.

=== Hunedoara Region ===
Pos	Team	Pld	W	D	L	GF	GA	GD	Pts	Qualification or relegation
1	Metalurgistul Cugir (C, Q)	26	16	5	5	58	22	+36	37	Qualification to promotion play-off
2	Minerul Deva	26	16	3	7	55	24	+31	35	
3	Minerul Aninoasa	26	16	2	8	56	29	+27	34	
4	Minerul Vulcan	26	15	4	7	64	35	+29	34	
5	Parângul Lonea	26	13	4	9	48	33	+15	30	
6	Dinamo Barza	26	13	3	10	40	32	+8	29	
7	Sebeșul Sebeș	26	13	3	10	59	55	+4	29	
8	Victoria Călan	26	10	4	12	40	37	+3	24	
9	Jiul Petrila II	26	9	6	11	44	48	−4	24	
10	Dacia Orăștie	26	9	2	15	25	40	−15	20	
11	CFR Simeria	26	6	7	13	35	60	−25	19	
12	Minerul Ghelari	26	7	4	15	37	67	−30	18	
13	CFR Teiuș	26	6	5	15	27	79	−52	17	
14	Auto Alba Iulia	26	4	6	16	28	55	−27	14	

Rules for classification: 1) points; 2) goal difference; 3) number of goals scored.
(C) Champions; (Q) Qualified for the phase indicated

=== Mureș Region ===
Series I

Pos	Team	Pld	W	D	L	GF	GA	GD	Pts	Qualification or relegation
1	Avântul Reghin (Q)	26	22	3	1	82	21	+61	47	Qualification to championship final
2	Străduința Cristuru Secuiesc	25	16	4	5	66	28	+38	36	
3	Voința Târnăveni	26	16	3	7	75	32	+43	35	
4	Ciocanul Târgu Mureș	26	15	2	9	68	31	+37	32	
5	Energia Fântânele	26	13	6	7	72	44	+28	32	
6	Mureșul Luduș	26	13	2	11	48	32	+16	28	
7	Oțelul Târgu Mureș	26	12	4	10	56	47	+9	28	
8	Victoria Iernut	25	8	7	10	34	48	−14	23	
9	Rapid Odorheiu Secuiesc	25	9	3	13	31	43	−12	21	
10	Voința Sărmaș	26	9	3	14	36	72	−36	21	
11	Cablul Târgu Mureș	26	7	5	14	28	55	−27	19	
12	Viitorul Apalina	26	6	5	15	27	48	−21	17	
13	Sticla Târnăveni	26	4	3	19	31	77	−46	11	
14	Avântul Sovata	25	3	4	18	40	106	−66	10	

Rules for classification: 1) points; 2) goal difference; 3) number of goals scored.
(Q) Qualified for the phase indicated

Series II

Pos	Team	Pld	W	D	L	GF	GA	GD	Pts	Qualification or relegation
1	Voința Târgu Mureș (Q)	26	18	4	4	49	32	+17	40	Qualification to championship final
2	Gloria Târgu Mureș	26	17	3	6	60	35	+25	37	
3	Chimica Târnăveni	26	14	7	5	63	32	+31	35	
4	UMTE Odorheiu Secuiesc	26	13	8	5	65	29	+36	34	
5	Metalul Vlăhița	26	13	4	9	51	36	+15	30	
6	Mureșul Toplița	26	11	6	9	47	47	0	28	
7	Lemnarul Târgu Mureș	26	9	8	9	54	29	+25	26	
8	Progresul Gheorgheni	26	9	7	10	41	36	+5	25	
9	Apemin Borsec	26	8	5	13	30	36	−6	21	
10	Progresul Reghin	26	9	3	14	23	42	−19	21	
11	Mureșul Remetea	26	8	5	13	41	62	−21	21	
12	Minerul Miercurea Ciuc	26	8	3	15	48	64	−16	19	
13	Minerul Bălan	26	5	4	17	29	80	−51	14	
14	Complexul Gălăuțaș	26	5	3	18	28	79	−51	13	

Rules for classification: 1) points; 2) goal difference; 3) number of goals scored.
(Q) Qualified for the phase indicated

Championship final

The matches were played on 21 and 24 June 1962.

Team 1	Agg.	Team 2	1st leg	2nd leg
Voința Târgu Mureș	2–4	Avântul Reghin	1–0	1–4

Avântul Reghin won the Mureș Regional Championship and qualify to promotion play-off in Divizia C.

=== Oltenia Region ===
Pos	Team	Pld	W	D	L	GF	GA	GD	Pts	Qualification or relegation
1	Drobeta Turnu Severin (C, Q)	30	18	7	5	73	26	+47	43	Qualification to promotion play-off
2	Electroputere Craiova	29	12	12	5	64	29	+35	36	
3	Progresul Caracal	30	16	4	10	47	37	+10	36	
4	Progresul Segarcea	30	13	9	8	50	39	+11	35	
5	Pandurii Târgu Jiu	30	10	11	9	54	45	+9	31	
6	Progresul Strehaia	30	13	5	12	53	50	+3	31	
7	Dunărea Calafat	30	11	8	11	31	39	−8	30	
8	Progresul Balș	30	10	9	11	61	58	+3	29	
9	Tractorul Corabia	30	11	7	12	53	55	−2	29	
10	Dunărea Turnu Severin	30	11	6	13	52	43	+9	28	
11	Metalurgistul Sadu	30	11	5	14	48	52	−4	27	
12	Progresul Filiași	29	11	5	13	45	49	−4	27	
13	Metalul 7 Noiembrie Craiova	30	9	9	12	39	50	−11	27	
14	Progresul Băilești	30	11	5	14	41	60	−19	27	
15	Petrolul Zătreni	30	9	6	15	24	48	−24	24	
16	Unirea Vânători	30	5	4	21	34	95	−61	14	

Rules for classification: 1) points; 2) goal difference; 3) number of goals scored.
(C) Champions; (Q) Qualified for the phase indicated

=== Ploiești Region ===
Pos	Team	Pld	W	D	L	GF	GA	GD	Pts	Qualification or relegation
1	Rapid Plopeni (C, Q)	26	17	4	5	70	27	+43	38	Qualification to promotion play-off
2	Unitex Pucioasa	26	14	5	7	47	27	+20	33	
3	Voința Râmnicu Sărat	26	13	6	7	47	28	+19	32	
4	Rafinăria Câmpina	26	12	8	6	53	40	+13	32	
5	Victoria Florești	26	10	8	8	44	33	+11	28	
6	Rapid Mizil	26	11	6	9	41	43	−2	28	
7	Rafinăria Teleajen	26	10	6	10	39	42	−3	26	
8	Muncitorul Schela Mare	26	10	4	12	39	46	−7	24	
9	Petrolul Ochiuri	26	10	4	12	36	52	−16	24	
10	Rapid Buzău	26	9	4	13	28	49	−21	22	
11	Feroemail Ploiești	26	8	5	13	29	41	−12	21	
12	Victoria Moreni	26	5	10	11	21	39	−18	20	
13	Geamuri Scăieni (R)	26	4	9	13	33	41	−8	17	Relegation to Ploiești District Championship
14	Carotajul Ploiești (R)	26	5	9	12	30	49	−19	17 (Note: Carotajul Ploiești deducted 2 points.)	Relegation to Ploiești District Championship

Rules for classification: 1) points; 2) goal difference; 3) number of goals scored.
(C) Champions; (Q) Qualified for the phase indicated; (R) Relegated

=== Suceava Region ===
Pos	Team	Pld	W	D	L	GF	GA	GD	Pts	Qualification or relegation
1	Unirea Botoșani (C, Q)	26	20	3	3	77	26	+51	43	Qualification to promotion play-off
2	Filatura Fălticeni	26	16	5	5	66	34	+32	37	
3	Feroviarul Câmpulung Moldovenesc	25	16	1	8	64	23	+41	33	
4	Minerul Vatra Dornei	26	13	5	8	65	41	+24	31	
5	Victoria Dorohoi	26	14	3	9	72	49	+23	31	
6	Energia Moldovița	26	11	8	7	64	48	+16	30	
7	ASA Câmpulung Moldovenesc	26	10	5	11	49	48	+1	25	
8	Metalul Rădăuți	26	9	3	14	60	59	+1	21	
9	Moldova Gura Humorului	26	7	6	13	34	60	−26	20	
10	Avântul Frasin	26	8	2	16	56	71	−15	18	
11	CFR Suceava	26	8	2	16	42	76	−34	18	
12	Sănătatea Siret	26	6	5	15	38	65	−27	17	
13	Spartac Suceava	26	7	3	16	39	82	−43	17	
14	Sănătatea Săveni	25	8	1	16	42	98	−56	17	

Rules for classification: 1) points; 2) goal difference; 3) number of goals scored.
(C) Champions; (Q) Qualified for the phase indicated

== See also ==
- 1961–62 Divizia A
- 1961–62 Divizia B
- 1961–62 Cupa României
