= Florin Constantinovici =

Romanian former footballer

Personal information
- Date of birth: 12 February 1968 (age 58)
- Place of birth: Bucharest, Romania
- Height: 1.82 m (5 ft 11 1/2 in)
- Position: Defender

Youth career
- CSȘ 2 București
- Mecanică Fină București
- –1988: Aversa București

Senior career*
Years	Team	Apps	(Gls)
1988–1993	Rapid București	133	(30)
1993–1994	Dinamo București	46	(5)
1995–1997	Rapid București	74	(10)
1997–1999	Heerenveen	29	(2)
2000	FC Brașov	13	(1)
2000–2001	Rapid București	18	(1)
2001–2002	Tzafririm Holon	16	(1)
2002–2003	Politehnica Timișoara	23	(0)
Total		352	(50)

International career
1991–1997	Romania B	12	(0)
1991–1992	Romania	3	(0)

Managerial career
- 2004–2019: Romania U21 (assistant)
- 2019–2026: Romania (assistant)
- * Club domestic league appearances and goals

Florin Constantinovici (born 12 February 1968) is a former Romanian footballer who played as a defender.

== Club career ==
Constantinovici was born on 12 February 1968 in Bucharest, Romania and began playing junior-level football at local club CSȘ 2 București. He completed his youth development with spells at Mecanică Fină București and Aversa București. He started his senior career at Rapid București, making his Divizia A debut under coach Ion Motroc on 28 May 1989 in a 2–0 away loss to Corvinul Hunedoara. Subsequently, he made five appearances in the 1989 Intertoto Cup, scoring a goal in a 5–0 victory against Spartak Varna. The team was relegated at the end of the 1988–89 season, but Constantinovici stayed with the club, helping it gain promotion back to the first league after one year.

In 1993, Constantinovici joined Dinamo București. There, he played in four UEFA Cup matches over the course of two seasons, but on both occasions the team was eliminated in the first round by Cagliari and Trabzonspor respectively. In the middle of the 1994–95 season, he made a comeback to Rapid. Constantinovici helped The Railwaymen reach the 1995 Cupa României final, where he played the entire match under coach Sorin Cârțu in the loss to Petrolul Ploiești. Afterwards, he played three games in the 1996–97 UEFA Cup in which they got past Lokomotiv Sofia in the qualifying round, but were eliminated by Karlsruhe in the following round. He then played three games during the 1997 Intertoto Cup, scoring once in a 2–0 home win over Žilina.

In 1997, Constantinovici went to play for Heerenveen where he became teammates with compatriots Dumitru Mitriță and Mugur Gușatu, and a young Ruud van Nistelrooy. He made his Eredivisie debut on 20 August 1997 under coach Foppe de Haan in a 3–1 home win over NAC Breda. Constantinovici scored his first goal in the competition on 4 April 1998 in a 2–1 away victory against MVV Maastricht. On 10 May, he scored once again in a 3–2 home win over RKC Waalwijk.

In the middle of the 1999–2000 season, Constantinovici returned to Romania, signing with FC Brașov. Subsequently, he went for a third spell to Rapid. He played two matches in the 2000–01 UEFA Cup, helping his side eliminate Mika, but they were defeated in the following round 1–0 on aggregate by Liverpool. For the 2001–02 season, Constantinovici went to play for Tzafririm Holon in the Israeli second league. Afterwards, he joined Politehnica Timișoara, making his last Divizia A appearance on 24 May 2003 in a 2–1 away loss to Dinamo București, totaling 275 matches with 38 goals in the competition.

== International career ==
From 1991 to 1997, Constantinovici was consistently featured for Romania's B side. He helped them win the 1991 Nehru Cup, where he played five matches, including the 3–1 win over rivals Hungary in the final.

Constantinovici played three friendly games for Romania, making his debut on 21 December 1991 under coach Mircea Rădulescu in a 3–1 away loss to Egypt. Three days later, he played in another match against Egypt, which ended in a 1–1 draw. His last appearance took place on 12 February 1992 in a 1–0 loss to Greece.

== Coaching career ==
From 2004 to 2019, Constantinovici served as an assistant coach for Romania's under-21 national team. The highlight of this tenure was reaching the semifinals of the 2019 European Championship alongside head coach Mirel Rădoi. In 2019, Constantinovici joined Rădoi to coach Romania's senior team. He worked there until 2026, and the highest achievement was reaching the Euro 2024 round of 16 under head coach Edward Iordănescu.

== Honours ==
Rapid București

- Divizia B: 1989–90
- Cupa României runner-up: 1994–95

Romania B

- Nehru Cup: 1991
