= Marian Bondrea =

Romanian footballer and manager

Personal information
- Date of birth: 2 November 1950 (age 75)
- Place of birth: Craiova, Romania
- Position: Midfielder

Team information
- Current team: Argeş Pitești (scouting coordinator)

Youth career
- –1969: Electroputere Craiova

Senior career*
Years	Team	Apps	(Gls)
1969–1972	Electroputere Craiova		
1972–1973	Universitatea Craiova		
1973–1974	Electroputere Craiova		
1974–1975	Șoimii Sibiu		
1975–1978	Electroputere Craiova		

Managerial career
- 1978–1986: Electroputere Craiova
- 1986–1988: Inter Sibiu
- 1989: Olt Scorniceşti
- 1989–1993: Electroputere Craiova
- 1993–1994: Universitatea Craiova
- 1994–1995: Argeş Pitești
- 1995: Naţional București
- 1996: Dinamo București
- 1997: Altay
- 1997–1998: Electroputere Craiova
- 1998–1999: Foresta Suceava
- 1999: Universitatea Craiova
- 2000–2001: Argeş Pitești
- 2001: Universitatea Craiova
- 2002: Hurriya
- 2002: Astra Ploieşti
- 2002–2004: Al-Hilal U19
- 2004–2005: FC Oradea
- 2005: Universitatea Craiova
- 2005: Universitatea Craiova (assistant)
- 2006–2007: Al-Hilal U18
- 2007–2008: CSM Râmnicu Vâlcea
- 2008–2009: Inter Gaz București
- 2010–2011: Al-Riyadh
- 2011–2012: CS Turnu Severin
- 2014: Ceahlăul Piatra Neamț (caretaker)
- 2025–: Argeş Pitești (scouting coordinator)
- * Club domestic league appearances and goals

Marian Bondrea (born 2 November 1950) is a Romanian former professional football manager and former player, currently scouting coordinator at Liga I club Argeş Pitești.

== Playing career ==
Born in Craiova, Marian Bondrea started his career at Electroputere (1969–1970), in the second division, he went on to play for Universitatea Craiova in (1972), but has only played there three official matches, was sent back at Electroputere in (1973), before joining Şoimii Sibiu in (1974–1975). He returns to Electroputere in (1975–1976) until 1978, where he finishes his career.

== Coaching career ==
The first coaching performance he gained was with FC Inter Sibiu, helping his team to get promoted in the first league Divizia A in 1988. After that he went back in his hometown and managed Electroputere, where he surprisingly took his team from second division, to the European competitions. He promoted them in 1991, and ended on third-place during the 1991–92 season above Universitatea Craiova their rivals at that time, enough to get a spot for the UEFA Cup. During the 1992–93 season, he was appointed as head-coach for Universitatea Craiova and ended third again, but brought his team to the Romanian Cup finals and won it. A year later he manages his team again to the Romanian Cup finals, but loses to Gloria Bistriţa and finishing as runners-up in the Romanian league 1993–94 season. He then moved to Bucharest to coach FC Naţional in the 1995–96 season, being replaced after a couple of months. During the years, he also coached in Turkey, Saudi Arabia and Syria.

== Honours ==
=== Coach ===
Electroputere Craiova

- Divizia B: 1990–91
- Divizia C: 1984–85, 1989–90

Universitatea Craiova

- Cupa României: 1992–93
