= Cezieni =

- Commune
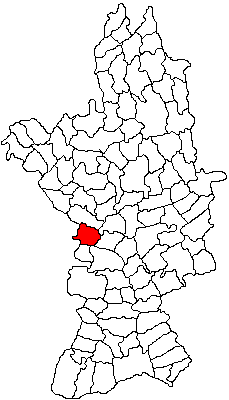
- Location in Olt County

- Location in Romania
- Coordinates: 44°11′N 24°16′E
- Country: Romania
- County: Olt
- Population (2021-12-01): 1,533
- Time zone: EET/EEST (UTC+2/+3)
- Vehicle reg.: OT

Cezieni is a commune in Olt County, Oltenia, Romania. It is composed of three villages: Bondrea, Cezieni and Corlătești.
