= FC Progresul Caracal =

Romanian football club, 1924–2004

Progresul Caracal
- Full name: Fotbal Club Progresul Caracal
- Founded: 1924 as Răsăritul Caracal
- Dissolved: 2004
- Ground: Parc
- Capacity: 12,000
Home colours	Away colours

Fotbal Club Progresul Caracal, commonly known as Progresul Caracal, was a Romanian professional football club based in Caracal, Olt County.

The club was founded in 1924, played five consecutive seasons in the Romanian second division between 1987 and 1992, and reached the Round of 32 of Cupa României six times, between 1963 and 2002.

== History ==
The club was founded in 1924 as Răsăritul Caracal. Among the founding members of this sports association were: Mircea Botoi, Gheorghe Dumitrescu, Tudor Voiculescu, Ștefan Săndulescu, supported by a few people with financial possibilities, including: Stavarache Borcescu, Ionică Brătașanu or Tudor Popescu.

The first major competition at which Răsăritul Caracal started was the 1926–27 season of the Oltenia Regional Championship, together with Rovine Grivița, Craiu-Iovan, Tinerimea, Generală, all from Craiova and Oltul Slatina and where it has been a constant presence for two decades.

The club was taken over by the management of the site that built the Bucharest-Craiova railway, changing its name to CFR (Căile Ferate Române) Caracal and participating in the first season of Divizia B after the Second World War. CFR finished 14th in Series I and was spared from relegation due to the change format of second division.

In 1947–48 season, CFR Caracal finished on 9th place, but due to the reorganization of Divizia B was relegated in Divizia C.

In February 1949, the shutting of Divizia C was announced, and CFR Caracal, which was in 10th place, was demoted to the regional championship.

Followed two decades in the Oltenia Regional Championship, during which period the club changed its name several times. In 1958, the club was taken over by the local authorities and for the ten years it was called Progresul, Victoria and Răsăritul Caracal.

The best results obtained during this period was the 3rd (1961–62) and 2nd (1963–64) place in the Regional Championship, as well as reaching the Round of 32 of Cupa României in 1963–64 season. The team led by Alexandru Apolzan lost 2–3 in front of Farul Constanța in a match played at Caracal.

In 1968, the club was renamed again as CFR Caracal and after the territorial reorganization of the country and the dissolution of the Regional Championship, the club played in the newly established Olt County Championship.

CFR Caracal will remain in the history of the Olt County Championship as the first county football champion, the team led by Ion Pârvulescu won the 1968–69 Olt County Championship, but lost the promotion play-off in Divizia C against Petrolul Târgoviște, the champion of Dâmbovița County, after a series of three matches (2–2, 2–2 and 0–1 on neutral ground at Ștefănești).

In 1969, after losing the promotion, the management of the club was changed again, the team being taken over by the canning factory and renamed as FC (Fabrica de Conserve).

At the end of the 1969–70 season, with Ion Pârvulescu still on the bench and players such as Oancea, Frăsineanu, Mototolu, Pătru, Cheran, Toma, Platagă, Cârciumaru, Petcu, Neagu, Mincioagă, and Marcu, among others, the team sponsored by the canning factory once again won the county championship and secured promotion to Divizia C by defeating Metalul Mija (2–1 in Mija and 2–1 in Caracal), the winners of the Dâmbovița County Championship, in the promotion play-off.

In the 1970–71 season, FC Caracal finished 2nd in the 4th series of Divizia C, narrowly missing promotion by two points, behind Chimia Râmnicu Vâlcea. In the 1971-72 season, the club was renamed Răsăritul and ended the campaign in 8th place.

Chronology of names
Name	Period
Răsăritul Caracal	1924–1946
CFR Caracal	1946–1958
Progresul Caracal	1958–1962
Victoria Caracal	1962–1963
Răsăritul Caracal	1963–1968
CFR Caracal	1968–1969
FC (Fabrica de Conserve) Caracal	1969–1971
Răsăritul Caracal	1971–1974
Vagonul Caracal	1974–1976
Răsăritul Caracal	1976–1979
Sportul Muncitoresc Caracal	1979–1988
FCM Caracal	1988–1991
FC Caracal	1991–1993
Progresul Caracal	1993–2004

After two more seasons in which finished mid-table twice - 9th (1972–73) and 7th (1973–74), the team from Caracal enter in decline. Renamed again, this time as Vagonul Caracal, due to the collaboration with Uzina de Vagoane (Wagon Factory), the following two seasons was ended at the bottom of the table - 13th (1974–75) and 14th (1975–76) fighting to avoid the relegation.

Reverted to its old name, Răsăritul finally relegated to the fourth division at the end of the 1976–77 season, finishing on 15th place.

The following season, Răsăritul went on to win the Olt County Championship after a strong battle with the team of Uzina de Vagoane Caracal and the promotion play-off against Gloria Berevoești (1–1 at Berevoești and 2–1 at Caracal), the champion of Argeș County.

After an escape from relegation, at the end of the 1978–79 season, the following campaign brought for the football from Caracal a new name for the first team of the city, Sportul Muncitoresc Caracal, and a 3rd place, with Constantin Năsturescu as a coach, at the end of the 1979–80 season. It was the best result from the second place at the beginning of the 1970s.

With Iuliu Uțu, the former goalkeeper of Dinamo București and Farul Constanța, as a head coach, Sportul Muncitoresc finished on the 5th place in the 1980–81 season and on the 10th place in 1981–82 season.

The team started the 1982–83 season with Ion Catană on the bench, which was replaced for the second part of the season with Ion Pârvulescu, finishing the championship on 5th place and managing to reach the first round proper of Cupa României after nineteen years, but lost in front of Petrolul Ploiești with 0–3 at Caracal.

In the 1983–84 season, Sportul Muncitoresc Caracal, coached by Ion Pârvulescu, reached the first round proper of Cupa României for the second consecutive time, where they will lose in front of the first division club Corvinul with 0–1. In the championship, nothing spectacular, the Caracal team finished 10th in the VI Series of Divizia C. The squad included the following players: Florea Mantoc - Marinel Pâstae, Marin Boscor, V. Roșca, Doru Dumitrescu - Marinescu, Ion Antonescu, Georgel Mitran, Lăcătuș, Plotoagă, Ion Năuiu, Nedelcu, Nițu.

The 1984–85 season, with Cornel Pavlovici as head coach, saw Sportul finishing 7th in the Series VI of third division and qualifying again in the first round proper of Cupa României, losing 0–1 (a.e.t.) to Rapid București. The lineup of Sportul: Florea Mantoc – V. Roșca I, I.Crețu, Teodor Nicu, M. Roșca II – Nedelcu (Constantin Lăcătuș), Ion Năuiu, Georgel Mitran – Pârvu, Nicolae Stângaciu, Plotoagă.

Iuliu Uțu was appointed as the new head coach for the 1985–86 season, with Sportul Muncitoresc finishing in 3rd place in Series VI. In the fall of 1985, Caracalenii qualified for the fifth time, and for the fourth consecutive time, for the Round of 32 of the Cupa României, eliminating Progresul Corabia (3–2), Știința Drăgănești (4–1), Muscelul Câmpulung (1–0), and Progresul Băilești (3–0), before being eliminated by Petrolul Ploiești (2–3) in a match played in Caracal.

The strong performances in the Cupa României foreshadowed the rise of Caracal football to a higher echelon. Coached by Ștefan Cherănoiu, Sportul Muncitoresc won Series VI in the 1986–87 season and secured promotion to the second division after four decades of competing in regional, county, or third-division championships.

The debut in Divizia B was not easy. A modest start in the first part of the season led to a series of coaching changes. Cherănoiu was replaced by Ilie Oană, who was subsequently replaced by Gheorghe Dungu. Sportul Muncitoresc ended the season with Ion Pârvulescu leading the team, finishing in 14th place and barely avoiding relegation.

This period was followed by four consecutive seasons in Series II, with the team finishing 4th in 1988–89, 7th in 1989–90, and 10th in 1990–91. The 1991–92 season began with Ștefan Cherănoiu on the bench, but he stepped down due to poor results and ongoing financial difficulties and was replaced by Nicolae Matei, who led the team to a 17th-place finish, resulting in relegation to the third division.

After the difficulties of the previous campaign, the club’s problems persisted in the 1992–93 season, with the team suffering a series of defeats during the autumn, which ultimately led to its withdrawal from the competition.

== Honours ==
Liga III

- Winners (1): 1986–87
- Runners-up (1): 1970–71

Liga IV – Olt County

- Winners (6): 1968–69, 1969–70, 1977–78, 1997–98, 2000–01, 2001–02

== League and Cup history ==
Season	Tier	Division	Place	Notes	Cupa României
2003–04	3	Divizia C (Serie V)	3rd	Disbanded	
2002–03	3	Divizia C (Serie IV)	4th		Round of 32
2001–02	4	Divizia D (OT)	1st (C)	Promoted	
2000–01	4	Divizia D (OT)	1st (C)		
1999–00	4	Divizia D (OT)	?		
1998–99	3	Divizia C (Serie III)	19th	Relegated	
1997–98	4	Divizia D (OT)	1st (C)	Promoted	
1993–97		Not active			
1992–93	3	Divizia C (Seria III)	20th	Withdrew	
1991–92	2	Divizia B (Seria I)	17th	Relegated	

Season	Tier	Division	Place	Notes	Cupa României
1990–91	2	Divizia B (Seria II)	10th		
1989–90	2	Divizia B (Seria II)	7th		
1988–89	2	Divizia B (Seria II)	4th		
1987–88	2	Divizia B (Seria II)	14th		
1986–87	3	Divizia C (Seria VI)	1st (C)	Promoted	
1985–86	3	Divizia C (Seria IV)	3rd		Round of 32
1984–85	3	Divizia C (Seria VI)	7th		Round of 32
1983–84	3	Divizia C (Seria VI)	10th		Round of 32
1982–83	3	Divizia C (Seria VII)	5th		Round of 32
1981–82	3	Divizia C (Seria VI)	10th		

== Former managers ==
- (Romania) Gheorghe Dungu
- (Romania) Alexandru Apolzan
- (Romania) Nicolae Oțeleanu
- (Romania) Ion Pârvulescu
- (Romania) Ștefan Cherănoiu
- (Romania) Nicolae Matei
