= FC Caracal (2004) =

- Full name: Fotbal Club Caracal
- Founded: 1949; 77 years ago as Metalul Craiova
- Dissolved: 2013; 13 years ago
- Ground: Various
- Capacity: 12,000
Home colours	Away colours

Fotbal Club Caracal was a Romanian professional football club from Caracal, Olt County. The club's best period was in the early 90s when Electroputere Craiova, as it was called then, played four consecutive seasons in the Romanian first league. The best ranking was obtained in the 1991–92 season when finished 3rd and qualified to UEFA Cup.

== History ==
Amid the rapid industrialization of Craiova in the early 1950s, a distinct football identity began to take shape, closely linked to the newly established Electroputere plant. Founded in 1949, the team—originally known as Metalul Craiova—was made up largely of workers from the factory.

While their initial performances in the regional championship were unremarkable, the team soon gained attention for its dynamic playing style and growing fanbase. Notable players from this era included Marin Năstase, Rici Smarandache, Constantin Monțescu, Dumitru Grigorescu, Nicolae Razga, Vasile Constantin, and Dumitru Hecher.

The 1950 season reflected the team's unpredictable nature: after three consecutive defeats, a series of four straight victories followed, leading to a final 5th place finish.

Renamed Metalul Electroputere, the team saw fluctuating results in the following years. In 1956, after a modest campaign, relegation to the city championship occurred, followed by a name change to Energia Electroputere. Under the guidance of coach Lambru Dunăreanu, a revival began. After a 3rd-place finish in the 1958–59 season, Electroputere went on to win the Craiova Regional Championship in the 1959–60 season. However, promotion to Divizia B was missed, with a 3rd-place finish behind Aurul Brad and Chimia Govora in the promotion play-off held in Ploiești.

A merger with the football section of CFR Craiova led to the formation of CFR Electroputere, which took over the railway club’s spot in Divizia B for the 1960–61 season. The presence in the second tier proved short-lived, ending in relegation after just one season, with a 13th-place finish in Series II. However, during that campaign, CFR Electroputere managed to reach the Round of 32 in the Cupa României, suffering a 2–4 defeat against CCA București.

In the following years, the team resumed activity under the name Electroputere, competing in the Oltenia Regional Championship while maintaining the ambition to reach the national divisions. At that time, the squad included Țecu Smarandache, Ion Belu, Vasile Vrejotis, Octavian Romeo, Venus Ciocîlteu, Ștefan Anghel, Matei Constantin, Stelian Chilom, Nicu Constantin, Ion Drăgan, and Ion Militaru. After finishing 2nd in the 1961–62 season, a 3rd-place finish in the 1962–63 campaign secured promotion to the newly re-established Divizia C. Among the team members during this period were also Nicolae Stere, Vică Oprea, Lili Popescu, and Virgil Resciuc..

Over the next five seasons, Electroputere competed in the West Series of Divizia C, finishing 10th in 1963–64, 6th in 1964–65, 4th in 1965–66, and 3rd in 1966–67. With the arrival of Nicolae Oțeleanu as head coach, the team achieved promotion to Divizia B after winning the West Series in the 1967–68 season. The squad during that successful campaign included Gh. Spinghel, Marin Bădici, Marian Terpovici, Nicu Constantin, Stelian Chilom, Emanoil Păunescu, Alexandru Stănescu, Marin Dașcu, Mihai Gavrilă, Iulian Popa, Marin Florescu, Matei Constantin, Firică Bulfan, George Sterie, Dan Cosci, Marin Bărbuț, Iulian Bălosu, Victor Niculescu, Virgil Resciuc, Dumitru Lovin, Cornel Chesnoiu, Constantin Țîră, Ion Nemțuc, and Constantin Nica.

In the following decade, Electro competed in Series II of the second division, recording a string of fluctuating results. In the 1968–69 and 1969–70 seasons, the team finished in 7th place. This was followed by a period of decline, with a 13th place finish in 1970–71, with Clement Iordănescu coaching in the first half and Constantin Voroncovschi in the second, and a 14th place finish in 1971–72, with Octavian Romeo in charge during the first half and Nicolae Opriș in the second. The team was tied on points with five other sides and narrowly avoided relegation at goal difference.

In the 1972–73 season, Electroputere again finished in 13th place, with Clement Iordănescu on the bench. The 1973–74 campaign, under the command of Haralambie Eftimie, ended with an 8th place finish and a notable appearance in the Cupa României, where the team reached the round of 32, being eliminated 0–2 after extra time by SC Tulcea. In that match, the lineup was composed of Mîniosu, Cotoșman, Tacoi (35’ Vîlceleanu), Bîtlan, Toma, Morovan (68’ Niță), Stanciu, Mincioagă, Bondrea, Pelea, and Șarpe.

The 1974–75 season brought a new peak in form, with the team finishing in 5th place under Gheorghe Dungu. The performance was repeated in 1975–76 with Ștefan Coidum as head coach, but in the following season, Electroputere dropped to 9th place. In 1977–78, with Petre Petculescu as coach, the team ended in 13th place, and in the 1978–79 season, it finished 16th in Series II, being relegated to Divizia C after eleven consecutive years in the second division.

After being relegated, Electroputere competed in Series VII of Divizia C, finishing as runners-up in 1979–80, 1980–81, 1981–82, and 1982–83, 4th in 1983–84, and ultimately winning the series in 1984–85 to secure a return to the second division. The squad, coached by Marian Bondrea, included Preduț, Bereza, Drînceanu, V. Smarandache, Veleanu, Bărbuceanu, Bărbuleț, D. Gherghe, Matei, Petca, Crețu, I. Sanda, M. Sanda, Firănescu, Biță (17 goals), Chibreanu, Petrișor, Ghiță, and Gârleșteanu.

In the middle of the 2003–04 season, Extensiv changed its name to FC Craiova, but with no connection to the FC Craiova that existed between 1940 and 1949.

In 2004 the club was moved to Caracal and renamed FC Caracal.

FC Caracal ended the 2012–13 season in second place, but after years of poor management and bad decisions, the club was dissolved in the summer of 2013.

== Chronology of names ==
Name	Period
Metalul Craiova	1949–1956
Energia Electroputere Craiova	1957–1958
Electroputere Craiova	1958–1960
CFR Electroputere Craiova	1960–1961
Electroputere Craiova	1961–1998
Extensiv Craiova	1998–2003
FC Craiova	2003–2004
FC Caracal	2004–2013

== Honours ==
Liga II

- Winners (2): 1990–91, 1998–99
- Runners-up (2): 1996–97, 1997–98

Liga III

- Winners (3): 1967–68, 1984–85, 1989–90
- Runners-up (6): 1979–80, 1980–81, 1981–82, 1982–83, 2008–09, 2012–13

Dolj Regional Championship:

- Winners (1): 1959–60
- Runners-up (1): 1961–62

== Electroputere Craiova in Europe ==
Competition	S	P	W	D	L	GF	GA	GD
UEFA Europa League / UEFA Cup	1	2	0	0	2	0	10	– 10
Total	1	2	0	0	2	0	10	– 10

== Notable former players ==
The footballers mentioned below have played at least one season for the club and also played in Liga I for another team.

- (Romania) Sorin Cârțu
- (Romania) Adrian Ilie
- (Romania) Sabin Ilie
- (Romania) Silviu Lung
- (Romania) Ionel Dănciulescu
- (Romania) Gheorghe Ciurea
- (Romania) Mircea Bornescu
- (Romania) Ionel Gane
- (Romania) Eugen Neagoe
- (Romania) Lucian Cotora
- (Romania) Silvian Cristescu
- (Romania) Mirel Rădoi

== Former managers ==
- (Romania) Rudolf Bürger (1951–1952)
- (Romania) Nicolae Oțeleanu (1967–1968)
- (Romania) Clement Iordănescu (1970)
- (Romania) Constantin Voroncovschi (1971)
- (Romania) Octavian Romeo (1971)
- (Romania) Nicolae Opriș (1972)
- (Romania) Clement Iordănescu (1972–1973)
- (Romania) Haralambie Eftimie (1973–1974)
- (Romania) Gheorghe Dungu (1974–1975)
- (Romania) Ștefan Coidum (1975–1977)
- (Romania) Petre Petculescu (1977–1979)
- (Romania) Marian Bondrea (1984–1985)
- (Romania) Sorin Cârțu (1987–1988)
- (Romania) Marian Bondrea (1989–1992)
- (Romania) Sorin Cârțu (1993)
- (Romania) Nicolae Negrilă (1995–1996)
- (Romania) Ioan Sdrobiș (1996–1997)
- (Romania) Sorin Cârțu (1997)
- (Romania) Marian Bondrea (1997–1998)
- (Romania) Grigore Sichitiu (1998–1999)
- (Romania) Sorin Cârțu (1998–2002)
- (Romania) Nicolae Ungureanu (2004–2006)
- (Romania) Nicolae Negrilă (2006)
- (Romania) Iordan Eftimie (2006)
- (Romania) Emil Vlăduț (2007)
- (Romania) Nicolae Ungureanu (2007)
- (Romania) Florin Cioroianu (2007–2008)
- (Romania) Daniel Mogoșanu (2008–2009)
- (Romania) Gheorghe Ciurea (2009)
- (Romania) Daniel Mogoșanu (2009–2010)
