= 1992–93 Divizia C =

Third tier Romanian football league

Divizia C
- Season: 1992–93

The 1992–93 Divizia C was the 37th season of Liga III, the third tier of the Romanian football league system.

== Team changes ==
=== To Divizia C ===
Relegated from Divizia B

- Petrolul Ianca
- Olimpia Râmnicu Sărat
- CS Târgoviște
- FEPA 74 Bârlad
- Caracal
- Sportul 30 Decembrie
- Aris Arad
- Gaz Metan Mediaș
- UM Timișoara
- Șoimii IPA Sibiu
- Metalurgistul Slatina
- Astra Arad
- Chimica Târnăveni
- Electromureș Târgu Mureș
- Minerul Cavnic
- Aripile Bacău
- Relonul Savinești
- CSM Borzești

=== From Divizia C ===
Promoted to Divizia B

- —

Promoted from County Championship

- ~~Agrojim Dângeni~~
- ~~Voința Petrobrad Asău~~
- Laminorul Brăila
- Cimentul Medgidia
- Astra Ploiești
- Constructorul Feroviar București
- Rapid Braniștea
- ~~IOB Balș~~
- Metalurgistul Sadu
- Venus Lugoj
- Dermata Cluj-Napoca
- Minerul Voivozi
- Viitorul Ocna Șugatag
- Măgura Codlea

Relegated to Divizia D

- ~~ASA Explorări Câmpulung Moldovenesc~~
- Steaua Minerul Vatra Dornei
- Tepro Iași
- Cristalul Dorohoi
- Steaua Mecanica Huși
- Minerul Gura Humorului
- Fortus Iași
- Minerul Crucea
- CSM Bucecea
- Aurora Târgu Frumos
- Carpați Gălănești
- Siretul Pașcani
- IMASA Sfântu Gheorghe
- Laminorul Roman
- Metalul Târgu Secuiesc
- Minerul Bălan
- Petrolul Moinești
- Electro Întorsura Buzăului
- ~~Minerul Comănești~~
- Viitorul Gheorgheni
- CPL Bacău
- Proletarul Bacău
- Voința Roman
- Metalul Roman
- Dunărea Romport Galați
- Șantierul Naval Galați
- Victoria Galați
- Autobuzul Chimia Mărășești
- Foresta Gugești
- Gloria Ivești
- Metalurgistul Tecuci
- Granitul Babadag
- Arrubium Măcin
- Unirea Progresul Făurei
- Tricotex Panciu
- Unirea ABROM Bârlad
- Metalul Filipeștii de Pădure
- Petrolul Berca
- Unirea Urlați
- Metalul Buzău
- IEMUTREC Chitila
- Hidrotehnica Buzău
- Metalul Mija
- CFR BTA București
- Tehnometal București
- Carpați Sinaia
- Chimia Buzău
- Montana Caraimanul Bușteni
- Electrosid Titu
- Victoria Florești
- IMGB București
- Chimia Găești
- Automatica București
- Steaua Petrolul Târgoviște
- Chimia Ploiești
- Girueta București
- Unirea Urziceni
- Voința București
- Rapid Fetești
- Olimpia Țăndărei
- Viscofil București
- CFR Constanța
- ~~Șantierul Naval Oltenița~~
- ISCIP Ulmeni
- Conpref Constanța
- Sportul IAMCRI Călărași
- Litoral Neptun Mangalia
- Dunărea Giurgiu
- Petrolul Roata de Jos
- Viitorul Chirnogi
- Victoria Lehliu
- Progresul Medgidia
- Minerul Berbești
- Muscelul Câmpulung
- Unirea Pitești
- Constructorul Slatina
- Dunărea Zimnicea
- Metalul Râmnicu Vâlcea
- Progresul Corabia
- Chimia Turnu Măgurele
- Rulmentul Alexandria
- Recolta Stoicănești
- Viitorul Drăgășani
- Dacia Cozia Călimănești
- Rapid Miercurea Ciuc
- Mecanica Bistrița
- Precizia Săcele
- Torpedo Zărnești
- Laminorul Beclean
- Carpați Agnita
- Carpați Brașov
- Mureșul Luduș
- Unirea Cristuru Secuiesc
- Hidrotehnica U Sibiu
- Chimia Năsăud
- Metalotehnica Târgu Mureș
- Constructorul Craiova
- Minerul Știința Vulcan
- Minerul Motru
- Petrolul Țicleni
- Dierna Orșova
- Severnav Turnu Severin
- Pandurii Târgu Jiu
- Parângul Lonea
- ~~Petrolul Stoina~~
- SUCPI Craiova
- Autobuzul Craiova
- Petrolul Târgu Cărbunești
- Unirea Tomnatic
- Victoria Călan
- Auto Timișoara
- AS Sânmartinu Sârbesc
- Minerul Moldova Nouă
- Electrica Timișoara
- Energia Deta
- CFR Simeria
- Strungul Chișineu-Criș
- Unirea Sânnicolau Mare
- Retezatul Hațeg
- Ceramica Jimbolia
- Mureșul Deva
- Minerul Ștei
- Aurul Brad
- Sticla Arieșul Turda
- Industria Sârmei Câmpia Turzii
- Mecanica Alba Iulia
- Soda Ocna Mureș
- Înfrățirea Oradea
- CPL Arad
- CUG Cluj-Napoca
- Oțelul Ștei
- Petrolul Arad
- Mobila Șimleu Silvaniei
- Minerul Baia Sprie
- Bradul Vișeu de Sus
- Minerul Baia Borșa
- Minerul Turț
- Voința Negrești-Oaș
- Chimia Tășnad
- Minerul Sărmășag
- Oașul Negrești-Oaș
- CIL Sighetu Marmației
- Rapid Jibou

=== Renamed teams ===
Aripile Bacău was renamed as Aerostar Bacău.

Relonul Savinești was renamed as Melana Savinești.

Celuloza Adjud was renamed as Vrancart Adjud.

Cotidianul Bacău was renamed as Cotidian Selena Bacău.

CS Botoșani was renamed as Mecanex Botoșani.

Măgura Codlea was renamed as Unirea Codlea.

Marvas Vaslui was renamed as Sportul Municipal Vaslui.

Dunărea Călărași was renamed as Sportul Călărași.

Mecos București was renamed as Glina București.

Electronistul Curtea de Argeș was renamed as Victoria Curtea de Argeș.

CSM Caransebeș was renamed as Caromet Caransebeș.

Șoimii IPA Sibiu was renamed as Șoimii Compa Sibiu.

Silcotub Zalău was renamed as Laminorul Victoria Zalău.

Dermata Cluj-Napoca was renamed as Clujana Cluj-Napoca.

Laminorul Brăila was renamed as Dacia Lamirom Brăila.

Calculatorul Bucureşti was renamed as Juventus Colentina Bucureşti.

Cuprom Baia Mare was renamed as Phoenix Baia Mare.

=== Other changes ===
Voința Petrobrad Asău and Minerul Comănești merged, the first one being absorbed by the second one. The new entity was named as Minerul 92 Comănești.

Agrojim Dângeni merged with ASA Explorări Câmpulung Moldovenesc to form ASA Agrojim Câmpulung Moldovenesc

Sportul 30 Decembrie merged with Rapid Braniștea forming Sportul Studențesc Agrariana Braniștea.

Unirea Tricolor București, ISCIP Ulmeni and Șantierul Naval Oltenița merged to form Unirea Tricolor Oltenița.

IOB Balș sold its place to Petrolul Stoina.

== League tables ==
=== Seria I ===
Pos	Team	Pld	W	D	L	GF	GA	GD	Pts	Qualification or relegation
1	Constructorul Iași (C, P)	38	26	4	8	87	30	+57	56	Promotion to Divizia B
2	Mureșul Toplița	38	23	3	12	95	44	+51	49	
3	Harghita Odorheiu Secuiesc	38	21	3	14	86	41	+45	45	
4	Aerostar Bacău	38	20	2	16	79	55	+24	42	
5	Meconerg Onești	38	19	4	15	70	58	+12	42	
6	Melana Savinești	38	20	1	17	76	66	+10	41	
7	Vrancart Adjud	38	20	1	17	52	61	−9	41	
8	ASA Agrojim Câmpulung Moldovenesc	38	19	2	17	64	45	+19	40	
9	Nitramonia Făgăraș	38	18	4	16	60	50	+10	40	
10	Cetatea Târgu Neamț	38	17	6	15	59	56	+3	40	
11	Minerul 92 Comănești	38	17	6	15	66	66	0	40	
12	FEPA 74 Bârlad	38	16	8	14	45	48	−3	40	
13	Bucovina Rădăuți	38	19	2	17	55	66	−11	40	
14	Cotidian Selena Bacău	38	18	3	17	61	55	+6	39	
15	Mecanex Botoșani	38	18	3	17	70	71	−1	39	
16	CFR Pașcani	38	17	4	17	59	55	+4	38	
17	Unirea Codlea (R)	38	16	3	19	45	64	−19	35	Relegation to Divizia D
18	Sportul Municipal Vaslui (R)	38	11	2	25	41	80	−39	24	Relegation to Divizia D
19	CSM Borzești (R)	38	5	6	27	26	84	−58	16	Relegation to Divizia D
20	Textila Buhuși (R)	38	6	1	31	29	130	−101	13	Relegation to Divizia D

Source: romaniansoccer.ro
Rules for classification: 1) Points; 2) Goal difference; 3) Number of goals scored.
(C) Champions; (P) Promoted; (R) Relegated

=== Seria II ===
Pos	Team	Pld	W	D	L	GF	GA	GD	Pts	Qualification or relegation
1	Metalul Plopeni (C, P)	38	22	8	8	78	29	+49	52	Promotion to Divizia B
2	Constructorul Feroviar București	38	22	4	12	57	39	+18	48	
3	Danubiana București	38	23	1	14	77	41	+36	47	
4	Sportul Călărași	38	21	5	12	71	46	+25	47	
5	Prahova Ploiești	38	19	5	14	62	43	+19	43	
6	Astra Ploiești	38	19	4	15	57	51	+6	42	
7	Poiana Câmpina	38	19	3	16	79	53	+26	41	
8	Cimentul Medgidia	38	18	5	15	66	46	+20	41	
9	Petrolul Ianca	38	18	5	15	65	47	+18	41	
10	Unirea Tricolor Oltenița	38	18	5	15	51	54	−3	41	
11	Juventus Colentina Bucureşti	38	17	4	17	60	55	+5	38	
12	Sportul Studențesc Agrariana Braniștea	38	17	4	17	60	55	+5	38	
13	Delta Tulcea	38	16	5	17	67	62	+5	37	
14	Glina București	38	16	5	17	57	56	+1	37	
15	Minerul Filipeștii de Pădure	38	15	6	17	58	56	+2	36	
16	Victoria Giurgiu	38	15	8	15	56	67	−11	36 (Note: Victoria Giurgiu deducted 2 points.)	
17	IMGB București (R)	38	14	5	19	45	76	−31	33	Relegation to Divizia D
18	Olimpia Râmnicu Sărat (R)	38	13	5	20	35	56	−21	31	Relegation to Divizia D
19	Chimia Brăila (R)	38	6	4	28	42	135	−93	16	Relegation to Divizia D
20	Dacia Lamirom Brăila (R)	38	5	3	30	32	105	−73	13	Relegation to Divizia D

Source: romaniansoccer.ro
Rules for classification: 1) Points; 2) Goal difference; 3) Number of goals scored.
(C) Champions; (P) Promoted; (R) Relegated

=== Seria III ===
Pos	Team	Pld	W	D	L	GF	GA	GD	Pts	Qualification or relegation
1	Gaz Metan Mediaș (C, P)	36	22	2	12	69	34	+35	46	Promotion to Divizia B
2	Petrolul Stoina	36	19	3	14	60	47	+13	41	
3	Dacia Pitești	36	17	5	14	50	48	+2	39	
4	Minerul Uricani	36	18	3	15	62	63	−1	39	
5	Arsenal Reșița	36	18	2	16	60	51	+9	38	
6	Cimentul Fieni	36	16	5	15	61	58	+3	37	
7	Minerul Mătăsari	36	17	2	17	68	53	+15	36	
8	Minerul Anina	36	17	2	17	51	52	−1	36	
9	Metalurgistul Sadu	36	15	6	15	53	55	−2	36	
10	Victoria Curtea de Argeș	36	15	6	15	56	66	−10	36	
11	CS Târgoviște	36	16	3	17	62	46	+16	35	
12	ROVA Roșiori	36	15	5	16	48	47	+1	35	
13	Minerul Lupeni	36	16	3	17	57	61	−4	35	
14	Paroșeni Vulcan	36	17	1	18	57	63	−6	35	
15	Metalurgistul Slatina	36	14	6	16	45	51	−6	34	
16	Unirea Alexandria	36	14	6	16	50	60	−10	34	
17	Caromet Caransebeș (R)	36	16	2	18	53	69	−16	34	Relegation to Divizia D
18	Șoimii Compa Sibiu (R)	36	16	1	19	51	55	−4	33	Relegation to Divizia D
19	Electrica Fieni (R)	36	11	3	22	31	65	−34	25	Relegation to Divizia D
20	FC Caracal (D)	0	0	0	0	0	0	0	0	Withdrew

Source: romaniansoccer.ro
Rules for classification: 1) Points; 2) Goal difference; 3) Number of goals scored.
(C) Champions; (D) Disqualified; (P) Promoted; (R) Relegated

=== Seria IV ===
Pos	Team	Pld	W	D	L	GF	GA	GD	Pts	Qualification or relegation
1	Phoenix Baia Mare (C, P)	38	22	6	10	75	60	+15	50	Promotion to Divizia B
2	Venus Lugoj	38	21	0	17	80	55	+25	42	
3	Vulturii Lugoj	38	21	4	13	62	46	+16	42 (Note: Vulturii Lugoj deducted 4 points.)	
4	Aris Arad	38	19	4	15	63	52	+11	42	
5	Unirea Dej	38	19	3	16	74	48	+26	41	
6	Avântul Reghin	38	17	6	15	61	39	+22	40	
7	Chimica Târnăveni	38	18	4	16	79	67	+12	40	
8	Victoria Carei	38	17	6	15	46	41	+5	40	
9	Electromureș Târgu Mureș	38	17	5	16	60	51	+9	39	
10	Someșul Satu Mare	38	16	7	15	63	62	+1	39	
11	Laminorul Victoria Zalău	38	18	3	17	63	64	−1	39	
12	Motorul Arad	38	19	1	18	63	81	−18	39	
13	Minerul Voivozi	38	18	2	18	58	48	+10	38	
14	UM Timișoara	38	17	4	17	63	55	+8	38	
15	Șoimii Lipova	38	18	2	18	63	61	+2	38	
16	Astra Arad	38	17	4	17	46	54	−8	38	
17	Metalul Aiud (R)	38	18	1	19	55	62	−7	37	Relegation to Divizia D
18	Minerul Cavnic (R)	38	16	1	21	52	55	−3	33	Relegation to Divizia D
19	Clujana Cluj-Napoca (R)	38	10	2	26	44	83	−39	22	Relegation to Divizia D
20	Ardudeana Ardud (R)	38	9	1	28	31	105	−74	15 (Note: Ardudeana Ardud deducted 4 points.)	Relegation to Divizia D

Source: romaniansoccer.ro
Rules for classification: 1) Points; 2) Goal difference; 3) Number of goals scored.
(C) Champions; (P) Promoted; (R) Relegated

== See also ==
- 1992–93 Divizia A
- 1992–93 Divizia B
- 1992–93 Cupa României
