= 1990–91 Divizia B =

Divizia B
- Season: 1990–91
- Promoted: Oțelul Galați; Electroputere Craiova; ASA Târgu Mureș
- Relegated: Siretul Pașcani; Mecanică Fină București; Vulturii Lugoj; Prahova Ploiești; Pandurii Târgu Jiu; CIL Sighetu Marmației; Poiana Câmpina; Minerul Motru; Aurul Brad; Fortus Iași; Montana Sinaia; Progresul Timișoara

The 1990–91 Divizia B was the 51st season of the second tier of the Romanian football league system.

The format has been maintained to three series, each of them having 18 teams. At the end of the season, the winners of the series promoted to Divizia A and the last four places from each series relegated to Divizia C.

== Team changes ==
=== To Divizia B ===
Promoted from Divizia C

- Fortus Iași
- Borzești
- Gloria CFR Galați
- Callatis Mangalia
- Progresul București
- Electroputere Craiova
- Șoimii IPA Sibiu
- Montana Sinaia
- Vulturii Lugoj
- Aurul Brad
- Metalurgistul Cugir
- CIL Sighetu Marmației

Relegated from Divizia A

- Flacăra Moreni

=== From Divizia B ===
Relegated to Divizia C

- Someșul Satu Mare
- CFR Pașcani
- IMASA Sfântu Gheorghe
- Electromureș Târgu Mureș
- CS Botoșani
- Metalul Mija
- Mureșul Deva
- Viitorul Vaslui
- Constructorul Craiova
- CFR Cluj

Promoted to Divizia A

- Progresul Brăila
- Rapid București
- Gloria Bistrița

=== Excluded teams ===
Victoria București and FC Olt Scornicești were excluded due to fall of communism in December 1989. This decision was made after it was proved that the ascension of the two teams was a forced one, with the help of the communist regime. Victoria was sponsored by the Romanian Ministry of Internal Affairs (the "Miliția", Police) and FC Olt was based in the hometown of Nicolae Ceaușescu, the former general secretary of the Romanian Communist Party from 1965 to 1989.

=== Renamed teams ===
ASA Târgu Mureș was renamed as ASA Electromureș Târgu Mureș.

== Teams ==
Locations of 1990-91 Divizia B clubs

== League tables ==
=== Serie I ===
Pos	Team	Pld	W	D	L	GF	GA	GD	Pts	Promotion or relegation
1	Oțelul Galați (C, P)	34	21	5	8	65	30	+35	47	Promotion to Divizia A
2	Gloria Buzău	34	17	7	10	63	42	+21	41	
3	Ceahlăul Piatra Neamț	34	16	6	12	51	39	+12	38	
4	Politehnica Iași	34	16	6	12	51	43	+8	38	
5	Steaua Mizil	34	17	4	13	39	38	+1	38	
6	Gloria CFR Galați	34	16	4	14	68	41	+27	36	
7	Foresta Fălticeni	34	17	2	15	71	59	+12	36	
8	Unirea Slobozia	34	17	2	15	60	50	+10	36	
9	Unirea Focșani	34	16	4	14	48	41	+7	36	
10	CSM Suceava	34	14	7	13	46	38	+8	35	
11	Callatis Mangalia	34	15	5	14	48	45	+3	35	
12	Olimpia Râmnicu Sărat	34	14	5	15	35	51	−16	33	
13	Aripile Bacău	34	13	6	15	47	45	+2	32	
14	Borzești	34	13	5	16	49	58	−9	31	
15	Siretul Pașcani (R)	34	12	3	19	34	69	−35	27	Relegation to Divizia C
16	Prahova Ploiești (R)	34	11	4	19	37	62	−25	26	Relegation to Divizia C
17	Poiana Câmpina (R)	34	10	6	18	35	66	−31	26	Relegation to Divizia C
18	Fortus Iași (R)	34	10	1	23	48	78	−30	21	Relegation to Divizia C

Source: romaniansoccer.ro (in Romanian)
Rules for classification: 1) Points; 2) Head-to-head points; 3) Head-to-head goal difference; 4) Head-to-head goals scored; 5) Head-to-head away goals scored; 6) Goal difference; 7) Goals scored.
(C) Champions; (P) Promoted; (R) Relegated

=== Serie II ===
Pos	Team	Pld	W	D	L	GF	GA	GD	Pts	Promotion or relegation
1	Electroputere Craiova (Note: Electroputere Craiova were deducted 2 points.) (C, P)	34	21	6	7	93	37	+56	46	Promotion to Divizia A
2	Chimia Râmnicu Vâlcea	34	20	6	8	69	27	+42	46	
3	CS Târgoviște	34	17	4	13	51	48	+3	38	
4	Sportul 30 Decembrie	34	15	7	12	57	37	+20	37	
5	Șoimii IPA Sibiu	34	17	3	14	52	46	+6	37	
6	Tractorul Brașov	34	15	5	14	58	54	+4	35	
7	Metalurgistul Slatina	34	16	3	15	53	52	+1	35	
8	Flacăra Moreni	34	12	10	12	47	34	+13	34	
9	Drobeta-Turnu Severin	34	15	4	15	62	54	+8	34	
10	Progresul Caracal	34	13	7	14	59	61	−2	33	
11	Gaz Metan Mediaș	34	15	3	16	57	60	−3	33	
12	ICIM Brașov	34	15	3	16	40	43	−3	33	
13	Autobuzul București	34	14	5	15	48	56	−8	33	
14	Progresul București	34	13	6	15	45	48	−3	32	
15	Mecanică Fină București (R)	34	12	7	15	40	50	−10	31	Relegation to Divizia C
16	Pandurii Târgu Jiu (R)	34	13	3	18	32	63	−31	29	Relegation to Divizia C
17	Minerul Motru (R)	34	10	5	19	30	72	−42	25	Relegation to Divizia C
18	Montana Sinaia (R)	34	7	5	22	26	77	−51	19	Relegation to Divizia C

Source: romaniansoccer.ro (in Romanian)
Rules for classification: 1) Points; 2) Head-to-head points; 3) Head-to-head goal difference; 4) Head-to-head goals scored; 5) Head-to-head away goals scored; 6) Goal difference; 7) Goals scored.
(C) Champions; (P) Promoted; (R) Relegated

=== Serie III ===
Pos	Team	Pld	W	D	L	GF	GA	GD	Pts	Promotion or relegation
1	ASA Târgu Mureș (C, P)	34	18	9	7	54	38	+16	45	Promotion to Divizia A
2	CFR Timișoara	34	19	5	10	60	35	+25	43	
3	Olimpia Satu Mare	34	17	7	10	47	29	+18	41	
4	Maramureș Baia Mare	34	18	4	12	84	42	+42	40	
5	UTA Arad	34	18	4	12	68	32	+36	40	
6	Gloria Reșița	34	16	8	10	47	29	+18	40	
7	Unirea Alba Iulia	34	18	3	13	53	43	+10	39	
8	Armătura Zalău	34	16	4	14	49	43	+6	36	
9	Vagonul Arad	34	17	2	15	61	56	+5	36	
10	Strungul Arad	34	14	8	12	51	46	+5	36	
11	CSM Reșița	34	13	8	13	42	48	−6	34	
12	Metalul Bocșa	34	15	3	16	36	47	−11	33	
13	Metalurgistul Cugir	34	13	5	16	47	47	0	31	
14	Chimica Târnăveni	34	14	2	18	37	56	−19	30	
15	Vulturii Lugoj (R)	34	13	3	18	38	61	−23	29	Relegation to Divizia C
16	CIL Sighetu Marmației (R)	34	8	8	18	32	62	−30	24	Relegation to Divizia C
17	Aurul Brad (R)	34	8	6	20	33	67	−34	22	Relegation to Divizia C
18	Progresul Timișoara (R)	34	6	1	27	29	87	−58	13	Relegation to Divizia C

Source: romaniansoccer.ro (in Romanian)
Rules for classification: 1) Points; 2) Head-to-head points; 3) Head-to-head goal difference; 4) Head-to-head goals scored; 5) Head-to-head away goals scored; 6) Goal difference; 7) Goals scored.
(C) Champions; (P) Promoted; (R) Relegated

== Top scorers ==
14 goals

- (Romania) Adrian State (Gloria CFR Galați)

12 goals

- (Romania) Ion Profir (Oțelul Galați)

11 goals

- (Romania) Adrian Oprea (Gloria CFR Galați)

8 goals

- (Romania) Valentin Ștefan (Gloria CFR Galați)
- (Romania) Costin Maleș (Oțelul Galați)

5 goals

- (Romania) Haralambie Antohi (Gloria CFR Galați)

== See also ==
- 1990–91 Divizia A
