= 1983–84 Divizia C =

Third tier Romanian football league

Divizia C
- Season: 1983–84

The 1983–84 Divizia C was the 28th season of Liga III, the third tier of the Romanian football league system.

== Team changes ==
=== To Divizia C ===
Relegated from Divizia B

- Minerul Gura Humorului
- Pandurii Târgu Jiu
- CIL Sighetu Marmației
- IMU Medgidia
- Mecanică Fină Steaua București
- UM Timișoara
- Viitorul Mecanica Vaslui
- Drobeta-Turnu Severin
- Strungul Arad
- Viitorul Gheorgheni
- Precizia Săcele
- Înfrățirea Oradea

Promoted from County Championship

- Avântul Gălănești
- Unirea Săveni
- Inter Vaslui
- Metalul Târgu Secuiesc
- Proletarul Bacău
- Victoria TC Galați
- Petrolul Berca
- Victoria Lehliu
- Tractorul Viziru
- IUPS Chitila
- Argeșul 30 Decembrie
- Textila Roșiori
- Știința Drăgănești-Olt
- Recolta Mihăești
- Progresul Băilești
- Mecanica Orăștie
- Metalul Oțelu Roșu
- Minerul Șuncuiuș
- Chimia Zalău
- Unio Satu Mare
- Unirea Dej
- Unirea Ocna Sibiului
- Electromureș Târgu Mureș
- Celuloza Zărnești

=== From Divizia C ===
Promoted to Divizia B

- Chimia Fălticeni
- Partizanul Bacău
- Olimpia Râmnicu Sărat
- Unirea Slobozia
- Metalul Plopeni
- Chimia Turnu Măgurele
- Constructorul TCI Craiova
- CFR Caransebeș
- Minerul Lupeni
- Steaua CFR Cluj
- Avântul Reghin
- Nitramonia Făgăraș

Relegated to County Championship

- Tepro Iași
- Metalul Botoșani
- Constructorul Sfântu Gheorghe
- AZO-TCM Săvinești
- Avântul Matca
- Rulmentul Bârlad
- Granitul Babadag
- Dobrogea Canal Basarabi
- TMB București
- Caraimanul Bușteni
- Progresul Topoloveni
- Constructorul Pitești
- IPC Slatina
- Minerul Horezu
- Vulturii Textila Lugoj
- Frontiera Curtici
- CFR Simeria
- Textila Cisnădie
- Bihorul Beiuș
- Rapid Jibou
- Sticla Bistrița
- Unirea Seini
- Progresul Odorheiu Secuiesc
- Tractorul Miercurea Ciuc

=== Renamed teams ===
Avântul Gălănești was renamed as Carpați Gălănești.

Siretul Bucecea was renamed as Electro Siretul Bucecea.

Gloria Focșani merged with Voința Odobești, was moved from Focșani to Odobești and was renamed as Voința Gloria Odobești.

Viitorul Mecanica Vaslui was renamed as Mecanica Vaslui.

Demar Mărășești was renamed as Chimia Mărășești.

Ferom Urziceni was renamed as Unirea Urziceni.

Petrolul Brăila was renamed as Petrolul Ianca Brăila.

Mecanică Fină Steaua București was renamed as Mecanică Fină București.

Petrolul Bolintin-Vale was renamed as ICPB Bolintin-Vale.

Recolta Mihăești was renamed as Metalul Mihăești.

Explorări Deva was renamed as Mureșul Deva.

=== Other changes ===
Rapid Jibou took the place of Chimia Zalău.

== League tables ==
=== Seria I ===
Pos	Team	Pld	W	D	L	GF	GA	GD	Pts	Promotion or relegation
1	CFR Pașcani (C, P)	30	22	2	6	74	18	+56	46	Promotion to Divizia B
2	Minerul Gura Humorului	30	18	5	7	50	23	+27	41	
3	Laminorul Roman	30	13	6	11	38	30	+8	32	
4	Metalul Rădăuți	30	13	5	12	38	35	+3	31	
5	Relonul Săvinești	30	13	4	13	43	39	+4	30	
6	ASA Câmpulung Moldovenesc	30	11	7	12	45	39	+6	29	
7	Minerul Vatra Dornei	30	13	3	14	42	38	+4	29	
8	Zimbrul Siret	30	10	9	11	38	37	+1	29	
9	Carpați Gălănești	30	14	1	15	36	50	−14	29	
10	Cetatea Târgu Neamț	30	13	3	14	43	57	−14	29	
11	Siretul Pașcani	30	14	0	16	63	47	+16	28	
12	Celuloza Piatra Neamț	30	13	2	15	40	47	−7	28	
13	Electro Siretul Bucecea	30	11	6	13	32	47	−15	28	
14	Avântul TCMM Frasin	30	12	4	14	31	51	−20	28	
15	Cristalul Dorohoi (R)	30	12	3	15	40	55	−15	27	Relegation to County Championship
16	Unirea Săveni (R)	30	7	2	21	28	68	−40	16	Relegation to County Championship

Source: romaniansoccer.ro
Rules for classification: 1) points; 2) goal difference; 3) number of goals scored.
(C) Champions; (P) Promoted; (R) Relegated

=== Seria II ===
Pos	Team	Pld	W	D	L	GF	GA	GD	Pts	Promotion or relegation
1	FEPA 74 Bârlad (C, P)	30	18	7	5	62	29	+33	43	Promotion to Divizia B
2	Aripile Bacău	30	16	10	4	66	20	+46	42	
3	Voința Gloria Odobești	30	13	5	12	31	41	−10	31	
4	Constructorul Iași	30	11	8	11	42	31	+11	30	
5	Mecanica Vaslui	30	11	8	11	37	30	+7	30	
6	Victoria Gugești	30	13	4	13	33	29	+4	30	
7	Petrolul Moinești	30	12	5	13	43	37	+6	29	
8	Inter Vaslui	30	12	5	13	34	45	−11	29	
9	Metalul Târgu Secuiesc	30	13	2	15	43	38	+5	28	
10	Letea Bacău	30	11	6	13	40	40	0	28	
11	Luceafărul Adjud	30	12	4	14	29	36	−7	28	
12	Viticultorul Panciu	30	10	8	12	27	40	−13	28	
13	Minerul Comănești	30	11	6	13	29	44	−15	28	
14	Chimia Mărășești	30	13	2	15	27	49	−22	28	
15	Proletarul Bacău (R)	30	11	5	14	42	42	0	27	Relegation to County Championship
16	Energia Gheorghe Gheorghiu-Dej (R)	30	7	7	16	24	58	−34	21	Relegation to County Championship

Source: romaniansoccer.ro
Rules for classification: 1) points; 2) goal difference; 3) number of goals scored.
(C) Champions; (P) Promoted; (R) Relegated

=== Seria III ===
Pos	Team	Pld	W	D	L	GF	GA	GD	Pts	Promotion or relegation
1	Metalul Mangalia (C, P)	30	18	5	7	51	23	+28	41	Promotion to Divizia B
2	IMU Medgidia	30	15	7	8	41	27	+14	37	
3	Șantierul Naval Tulcea	30	16	4	10	45	30	+15	36	
4	Victoria Tecuci	30	16	2	12	49	36	+13	34	
5	Arrubium Măcin	30	13	7	10	45	33	+12	33	
6	Voința Constanța	30	14	5	11	38	34	+4	33	
7	Cimentul Medgidia	30	11	7	12	49	42	+7	29	
8	DVA Portul Galați	30	13	3	14	48	44	+4	29	
9	Chimia Brăila	30	11	7	12	41	38	+3	29	
10	Laminorul Brăila	30	10	9	11	28	33	−5	29	
11	Chimpex Constanța	30	11	7	12	40	45	−5	29	
12	Portul Constanța	30	11	6	13	40	34	+6	28	
13	Progresul Isaccea	30	11	6	13	36	61	−25	28	
14	Ancora Galați	30	11	5	14	35	51	−16	27	
15	Victoria TC Galați (R)	30	9	4	17	33	51	−18	22	Relegation to County Championship
16	Șoimii Cernavodă (R)	30	6	4	20	22	59	−37	16	Relegation to County Championship

Source: romaniansoccer.ro
Rules for classification: 1) points; 2) goal difference; 3) number of goals scored.
(C) Champions; (P) Promoted; (R) Relegated

=== Seria IV ===
Pos	Team	Pld	W	D	L	GF	GA	GD	Pts	Promotion or relegation
1	ASA Mizil (C, P)	30	22	5	3	69	26	+43	49	Promotion to Divizia B
2	Chimia Brazi	30	22	2	6	79	25	+54	46	
3	Chimia Buzău	30	17	5	8	54	31	+23	39	
4	Poiana Câmpina	30	16	3	11	56	39	+17	35	
5	Minerul Filipeștii de Pădure	30	13	5	12	47	35	+12	31	
6	Carpați Nehoiu	30	13	3	14	47	42	+5	29	
7	Petrolul Ianca Brăila	30	13	2	15	34	45	−11	28	
8	Rapid Fetești	30	12	3	15	35	45	−10	27	
9	Petrolul Băicoi	30	13	1	16	38	61	−23	27	
10	Carpați Sinaia	30	11	4	15	54	40	+14	26	
11	Petrolul Berca	30	11	4	15	37	54	−17	26	
12	Victoria Lehliu	30	12	2	16	30	69	−39	26	
13	Metalul Buzău	30	11	3	16	34	44	−10	25	
14	Victoria Țăndărei	30	11	2	17	43	58	−15	24	
15	Tractorul Viziru (R)	30	11	1	18	40	56	−16	23	Relegation to County Championship
16	Unirea Urziceni (R)	30	7	5	18	29	56	−27	19	Relegation to County Championship

Source: romaniansoccer.ro
Rules for classification: 1) points; 2) goal difference; 3) number of goals scored.
(C) Champions; (P) Promoted; (R) Relegated

=== Seria V ===
Pos	Team	Pld	W	D	L	GF	GA	GD	Pts	Promotion or relegation
1	Mecanică Fină București (C, P)	30	17	6	7	55	18	+37	40	Promotion to Divizia B
2	ICSIM București	30	12	8	10	41	26	+15	32	
3	Danubiana București	30	13	6	11	55	42	+13	32	
4	ICPB Bolintin-Vale	30	13	6	11	47	36	+11	32	
5	Aversa București	30	13	5	12	41	38	+3	31	
6	Abatorul București	30	11	9	10	36	41	−5	31	
7	Flacăra Roșie București	30	11	9	10	33	38	−5	31	
8	Șantierul Naval Oltenița	30	11	8	11	38	39	−1	30	
9	IUPS Chitila	30	12	6	12	30	33	−3	30	
10	ISCIP Ulmeni	30	12	5	13	38	40	−2	29	
11	Argeșul 30 Decembrie	30	12	5	13	29	39	−10	29	
12	Tehnometal București	30	12	4	14	52	46	+6	28	
13	Viscofil București	30	12	4	14	45	51	−6	28	
14	Viitorul Chirnogi	30	11	6	13	37	56	−19	28	
15	Constructorul Călărași (R)	30	7	11	12	29	45	−16	25	Relegation to County Championship
16	FCM Giurgiu (R)	30	7	10	13	28	46	−18	24	Relegation to County Championship

Source: romaniansoccer.ro
Rules for classification: 1) points; 2) goal difference; 3) number of goals scored.
(C) Champions; (P) Promoted; (R) Relegated

=== Seria VI ===
Pos	Team	Pld	W	D	L	GF	GA	GD	Pts	Promotion or relegation
1	Flacăra-Automecanica Moreni (C, P)	30	21	3	6	71	42	+29	45	Promotion to Divizia B
2	Muscelul Câmpulung	30	15	4	11	51	22	+29	34	
3	Progresul Corabia	30	16	1	13	54	45	+9	33	
4	Electrica Titu	30	13	5	12	40	32	+8	31	
5	Recolta Stoicănești	30	14	2	14	41	47	−6	30	
6	Textila Roșiori	30	13	4	13	29	37	−8	30	
7	Știința Drăgănești-Olt	30	14	2	14	40	47	−7	30	
8	Metalul Mija	30	12	4	14	41	33	+8	28	
9	Dacia Pitești	30	12	4	14	45	39	+6	28	
10	Sportul Muncitoresc Caracal	30	13	2	15	46	41	+5	28	
11	Cimentul Fieni	30	11	6	13	34	39	−5	28	
12	Chimia Găești	30	12	4	14	41	47	−6	28	
13	Electronistul Curtea de Argeș	30	12	4	14	32	45	−13	28	
14	Dunărea Venus Zimnicea	30	12	4	14	34	48	−14	28	
15	Petrolul Videle (R)	30	11	7	12	38	50	−12	27 (Note: Petrolul Videle and Cetatea Turnu Măgurele deducted 2 points.)	Relegation to County Championship
16	Cetatea Turnu Măgurele (R)	30	9	4	17	33	56	−23	20	Relegation to County Championship

Source: romaniansoccer.ro
Rules for classification: 1) points; 2) goal difference; 3) number of goals scored.
(C) Champions; (P) Promoted; (R) Relegated

=== Seria VII ===
Pos	Team	Pld	W	D	L	GF	GA	GD	Pts	Promotion or relegation
1	Drobeta-Turnu Severin (C, P)	30	20	1	9	61	33	+28	40 (Note: Drobeta-Turnu Severin deducted 1 point.)	Promotion to Divizia B
2	Pandurii Târgu Jiu	30	15	3	12	46	41	+5	33	
3	Petrolul Țicleni	30	12	8	10	39	43	−4	32	
4	Electroputere Craiova	30	12	7	11	49	33	+16	31	
5	CFR Craiova	30	12	7	11	30	32	−2	31	
6	Metalurgistul Sadu	30	14	3	13	29	34	−5	31	
7	Dierna Orșova	30	12	6	12	49	37	+12	30	
8	Mecanizatorul Șimian	30	12	6	12	39	33	+6	30	
9	Metalul Mihăești	30	14	2	14	40	40	0	30	
10	Jiul Rovinari	30	15	0	15	43	44	−1	30	
11	Viitorul Drăgășani	30	14	2	14	40	50	−10	30	
12	Progresul Băilești	30	13	2	15	50	44	+6	28	
13	Armătura Strehaia	30	13	2	15	51	48	+3	28	
14	Dunărea Calafat	30	12	4	14	40	41	−1	28	
15	Lotru Brezoi (R)	30	13	1	16	46	68	−22	27	Relegation to County Championship
16	Celuloza Drobeta-Turnu Severin (R)	30	7	6	17	33	64	−31	20	Relegation to County Championship

Source: romaniansoccer.ro
Rules for classification: 1) points; 2) goal difference; 3) number of goals scored.
(C) Champions; (P) Promoted; (R) Relegated

=== Seria VIII ===
Pos	Team	Pld	W	D	L	GF	GA	GD	Pts	Promotion or relegation
1	Mureșul Deva (C, P)	30	16	6	8	53	33	+20	38	Promotion to Divizia B
2	UM Timișoara	30	14	3	13	57	37	+20	31	
3	Mecanica Orăștie	30	15	1	14	49	53	−4	31	
4	Minerul Paroșeni	30	13	5	12	41	46	−5	31	
5	Minerul Moldova Nouă	30	14	2	14	41	39	+2	30	
6	Minerul Știința Vulcan	30	13	4	13	38	47	−9	30	
7	Metalul Bocșa	30	13	3	14	40	32	+8	29	
8	Dacia Orăștie	30	11	7	12	58	50	+8	29	
9	Minerul Certej	30	13	3	14	48	47	+1	29	
10	Metalul Oțelu Roșu	30	14	1	15	38	40	−2	29	
11	Minerul Anina	30	13	3	14	46	48	−2	29	
12	Victoria Călan	30	13	3	14	35	37	−2	29	
13	Constructorul Timișoara	30	13	3	14	57	62	−5	29	
14	Minerul Oravița	30	13	3	14	39	45	−6	29	
15	Minerul Ghelar (R)	30	12	5	13	35	52	−17	29	Relegation to County Championship
16	Minerul Aninoasa (R)	30	11	6	13	32	39	−7	28	Relegation to County Championship

Source: romaniansoccer.ro
Rules for classification: 1) points; 2) goal difference; 3) number of goals scored.
(C) Champions; (P) Promoted; (R) Relegated

This is the most balanced league in professional football history. First placed Mureşul Deva and relegated Minerul Aninoasa were separated by only 10 points, while the difference between second placed UMT Timişoara and Minerul Aninoasa was just 3 points (31-28).

=== Seria IX ===
Pos	Team	Pld	W	D	L	GF	GA	GD	Pts	Promotion or relegation
1	Strungul Arad (C, P)	30	15	8	7	58	25	+33	38	Promotion to Divizia B
2	Voința Oradea	30	17	2	11	45	34	+11	36	
3	Oțelul Bihor	30	15	2	13	57	46	+11	32	
4	Minerul Bihor	30	14	3	13	44	39	+5	31	
5	Înfrățirea Oradea	30	14	4	12	43	26	+17	30 (Note: Înfrățirea Oradea deducted 2 points.)	
6	Șoimii Lipova	30	13	4	13	52	50	+2	30	
7	Unirea Sânnicolau Mare	30	13	4	13	39	44	−5	30	
8	Silvania Cehu Silvaniei	30	12	5	13	47	49	−2	29	
9	Minerul Sărmășag	30	13	3	14	35	43	−8	29	
10	Victoria Ineu	30	13	3	14	43	54	−11	29	
11	Minerul Șuncuiuș	30	12	4	14	43	42	+1	28	
12	Unirea Valea lui Mihai	30	12	4	14	45	48	−3	28	
13	CFR Arad	30	13	2	15	34	39	−5	28	
14	Unirea Tomnatic	30	11	6	13	46	51	−5	28	
15	Bihoreana Marghita (R)	30	13	1	16	47	50	−3	27	Relegation to County Championship
16	Rapid Jibou (R)	30	12	1	17	38	76	−38	25	Relegation to County Championship

Source: romaniansoccer.ro
Rules for classification: 1) points; 2) goal difference; 3) number of goals scored.
(C) Champions; (P) Promoted; (R) Relegated

=== Seria X ===
Pos	Team	Pld	W	D	L	GF	GA	GD	Pts	Promotion or relegation
1	Sticla Arieșul Turda (C, P)	30	18	6	6	49	27	+22	42	Promotion to Divizia B
2	Unio Satu Mare	30	16	2	12	45	32	+13	34	
3	CIL Sighetu Marmației	30	13	7	10	50	33	+17	33	
4	Oașul Negrești-Oaș	30	14	4	12	44	31	+13	32	
5	Minerul Baia Borșa	30	13	6	11	43	40	+3	32	
6	Minerul Băița	30	11	7	12	38	38	0	29	
7	Minerul Baia Sprie	30	10	8	12	48	44	+4	28	
8	Lăpușul Târgu Lăpuș	30	12	4	14	34	38	−4	28	
9	Olimpia Gherla	30	11	6	13	43	55	−12	28	
10	Chimia Tășnad	30	11	6	13	38	47	−9	28	
11	Bradul Vișeu de Sus	30	13	2	15	38	56	−18	28	
12	Victoria Carei	30	15	3	12	51	27	+24	27 (Note: Victoria Carei deducted 6 points.)	
13	Minerul Băiuț	30	11	5	14	42	42	0	27	
14	Cuprom Baia Mare	30	10	7	13	39	49	−10	27	
15	Construcții Electrometal Cluj-Napoca (R)	30	10	6	14	30	48	−18	26	Relegation to County Championship
16	Unirea Dej (R)	30	10	5	15	38	63	−25	25	Relegation to County Championship

Source: romaniansoccer.ro
Rules for classification: 1) points; 2) goal difference; 3) number of goals scored.
(C) Champions; (P) Promoted; (R) Relegated

=== Seria XI ===
Pos	Team	Pld	W	D	L	GF	GA	GD	Pts	Promotion or relegation
1	Unirea Alba Iulia (C, P)	30	16	6	8	60	34	+26	38	Promotion to Divizia B
2	Metalul Aiud	30	15	4	11	50	27	+23	34	
3	Metalotehnica Târgu Mureș	30	12	8	10	39	28	+11	32	
4	Inter Sibiu	30	12	8	10	41	32	+9	32	
5	Unirea Ocna Sibiului	30	14	4	12	42	38	+4	32	
6	Soda Ocna Mureș	30	14	4	12	41	44	−3	32	
7	Electromureș Târgu Mureș	30	13	5	12	43	30	+13	31	
8	Mecanica Alba Iulia	30	14	3	13	40	37	+3	31	
9	Oțelul Reghin	30	13	5	12	39	46	−7	31	
10	Mureșul Luduș	30	13	4	13	47	44	+3	30	
11	Metalul Sighișoara	30	12	6	12	38	44	−6	30	
12	IMIX Agnita	30	13	4	13	33	58	−25	30	
13	Foresta Bistrița	30	13	3	14	49	42	+7	29	
14	Minerul Rodna	30	13	3	14	35	36	−1	29	
15	Șurianu Sebeș (R)	30	13	2	15	37	49	−12	28	Relegation to County Championship
16	Textila Năsăud (R)	30	2	7	21	20	65	−45	11	Relegation to County Championship

Source: romaniansoccer.ro
Rules for classification: 1) points; 2) goal difference; 3) number of goals scored.
(C) Champions; (P) Promoted; (R) Relegated

=== Seria XII ===
Pos	Team	Pld	W	D	L	GF	GA	GD	Pts	Promotion or relegation
1	Tractorul Brașov (C, P)	30	18	8	4	52	15	+37	44	Promotion to Divizia B
2	Viitorul Gheorgheni	30	15	9	6	62	22	+40	39	
3	Minerul Bălan	30	14	3	13	32	38	−6	31	
4	Precizia Săcele	30	13	6	11	35	28	+7	30 (Note: Precizia Săcele deducted 2 points.)	
5	Mureșul Toplița	30	13	3	14	40	39	+1	29	
6	Minerul Baraolt	30	14	1	15	38	38	0	29	
7	Textila Prejmer	30	12	5	13	30	45	−15	29	
8	Mobila Măgura Codlea	30	11	6	13	40	36	+4	28	
9	ICIM Brașov	30	11	6	13	40	40	0	28	
10	Metrom Brașov	30	13	2	15	33	36	−3	28	
11	Electro Sfântu Gheorghe	30	12	4	14	40	43	−3	28	
12	Utilajul Făgăraș	30	13	2	15	34	38	−4	28	
13	Unirea Cristuru Secuiesc	30	12	4	14	30	50	−20	28	
14	Celuloza Zărnești	30	11	5	14	35	43	−8	27	
15	Torpedo Zărnești (R)	30	11	5	14	34	44	−10	27	Relegation to County Championship
16	Chimia Orașul Victoria (R)	30	10	5	15	34	54	−20	25	Relegation to County Championship

Source: romaniansoccer.ro
Rules for classification: 1) points; 2) goal difference; 3) number of goals scored.
(C) Champions; (P) Promoted; (R) Relegated

== See also ==
- 1983–84 Divizia A
- 1983–84 Divizia B
- 1983–84 County Championship
- 1983–84 Cupa României
