= 1988–89 Divizia C =

Third tier Romanian football league

Divizia C
- Season: 1988–89

The 1988–89 Divizia C was the 33rd season of Liga III, the third tier of the Romanian football league system.

The format has been maintained to twelve series, each of them having 16 teams. At the end of the season the winners of the series promoted to Divizia B and the last two places from each series relegated to County Championship.

== Team changes ==
=== To Divizia C ===
Relegated from Divizia B

- Inter Vaslui
- Unirea Slobozia
- Olimpia Râmnicu Sărat
- Petrolul Ianca
- Autobuzul București
- Mecanică Fină București
- Metalul București
- Progresul Vulcan București
- Sticla Arieșul Turda
- CIL Sighetu Marmației
- Minerul Baia Sprie
- Victoria Carei

Promoted from County Championship

- Rapid Miercurea Ciuc
- Metalul IM Roman
- Mecanica Sport Galați
- Granitul Babadag
- Hidrotehnica Buzău
- Victoria Lehliu
- Electrica Fieni
- SM Drăgănești-Olt
- Petrolul Stoina
- Petrolul Arad
- Voința Oradea
- CUG Cluj-Napoca
- Bradul Vișeu de Sus
- Carpați Brașov
- Carpați Agnita
- Retezatul Hațeg
- Metalul IUM Filipeștii de Pădure
- Energia Săsciori
- Petrolul Poeni
- Forestierul Băbeni
- CSM Bucecea
- Fortus Iași
- Constructorul Șoimii Craiova
- Autobuzul Voința Odobești

=== From Divizia C ===
Promoted to Divizia B

- ASA Explorări Câmpulung Moldovenesc
- Aripile Bacău
- Metalul Mangalia
- Dunărea Călărași
- Metalul Mija
- Dacia Pitești
- Minerul Motru
- CFR Timișoara
- Minerul Cavnic
- Unirea Alba Iulia
- Avântul Reghin
- Poiana Câmpina

Relegated to County Championship

- Tepro Iași
- Electro Botoșani
- Constructorul Hidro Focșani
- Moldosin Vaslui
- Chimia Brăila
- Minerul Mahmudia
- Carpați Nehoiu
- Metalul Buzău
- Chimia Găești
- Petrolul Târgoviște
- Textila Roșiori
- CFR Craiova
- Energia Minerul Rovinari
- Metalul Oțelu Roșu
- Recolta Salonta
- Unirea Valea lui Mihai
- Minerul Băiuț
- Motorul IRA Cluj-Napoca
- Târnavele Blaj
- Mecanica Alba Iulia
- Minerul Rodna
- Hebe Sângeorz-Băi
- Mobila Măgura Codlea
- Carpați Sinaia

=== Renamed teams ===
Inter Vaslui was renamed as Viitorul Vaslui.

Gloria Galați was renamed as Gloria CFR Galați.

Mecanica Sport Galați was renamed as Mecanosport Galați.

Victoria IRA Tecuci was renamed as Victoria CFR Tecuci.

Automatica Alexandria was renamed as Unirea Alexandria.

Luceafărul Adjud was renamed as Celuloza Adjud.

Sticla Arieșul Turda was renamed as Sticla Turda.

Utilaje Grele Giurgiu was renamed as Victoria Giurgiu.

Chimia Turnu Măgurele was renamed as Chimia Victoria Turnu Măgurele.

Auto Vulcan Timișoara was renamed as Auto Energia Timișoara.

ASA Chimia Ploiești was renamed as ASA Chimia Brazi.

Chimforest Năsăud was renamed as Chimia Năsăud.

Autobuzul Laminorul Focșani was renamed as Autobuzul Voința Odobești.

Dunărea CSU Galați was renamed as Știința Navrom Galați.

DVA Portul Galați was renamed as Șantierul Naval Galați.

IMU CSȘ Medgidia was renamed as Progresul CSȘ Medgidia.

Cimentul Medgidia was renamed as Voința ICS Medgidia.

Progresul Vulcan București was renamed as Progresul Energia București.

Abatorul București was renamed as ASIC București.

Mureșul Deva was renamed as Mureșul Explorări Deva.

Petrolul Ianca was renamed as Petrolul Brăila.

=== Other changes ===
Petrolul Zădăreni moved to Arad and was renamed as Petrolul Arad.

Autobuzul Laminorul Focșani moved to Odobești and was renamed as Autobuzul Voința Odobești.

Laminorul Viziru moved to Brăila and was renamed as Laminorul Brăila.

Viitorul Drăgășani entered into partnership with CSȘ Drăgășani and was renamed as Viitorul CSȘ Drăgășani.

Dacia Metalul Râmnicu Vâlcea moved to Călimănești and was renamed as Dacia Cozia Călimănești.

== League tables ==
=== Seria I ===
Pos	Team	Pld	W	D	L	GF	GA	GD	Pts	Qualification or relegation
1	Chimia Fălticeni (C, P)	30	20	4	6	74	27	+47	44	Promotion to Divizia B
2	Minerul Gura Humorului	30	17	6	7	45	23	+22	40	
3	Metalul Rădăuți	30	13	7	10	50	41	+9	33	
4	Cetatea Târgu Neamț	30	14	4	12	52	33	+19	32	
5	Metalul IM Roman	30	14	2	14	46	58	−12	30	
6	Steaua Minerul Vatra Dornei	30	11	7	12	41	40	+1	29	
7	Aurora Târgu Frumos	30	13	3	14	39	43	−4	29	
8	Constructorul Iași	30	12	4	14	52	47	+5	28	
9	Avântul TCMM Frasin	30	13	2	15	56	53	+3	28	
10	Fortus Iași	30	11	6	13	48	50	−2	28	
11	CSM Bucecea	30	13	2	15	46	55	−9	28	
12	Laminorul Roman	30	11	6	13	37	47	−10	28	
13	Carpați Gălănești	30	12	4	14	33	46	−13	28	
14	Zimbrul Siret	30	14	0	16	46	60	−14	28	
15	Metalul Botoșani (R)	30	12	3	15	44	62	−18	27	Relegation to County Championship
16	Celuloza ITA Piatra Neamț (R)	30	7	6	17	31	55	−24	20	Relegation to County Championship

Source: romaniansoccer.ro
Rules for classification: 1) Points; 2) Goal difference; 3) Number of goals scored.
(C) Champions; (P) Promoted; (R) Relegated

=== Seria II ===
Pos	Team	Pld	W	D	L	GF	GA	GD	Pts	Qualification or relegation
1	Viitorul Vaslui (C, P)	30	21	3	6	88	35	+53	45	Promotion to Divizia B
2	Gloria CFR Galați	30	20	1	9	82	25	+57	41	
3	Steaua Mecanica Huși	30	15	3	12	59	41	+18	33	
4	Minerul Comănești	30	15	2	13	41	53	−12	32	
5	Mecon Gheorghe Gheorghiu-Dej	30	14	3	13	37	42	−5	31	
6	Partizanul Bacău	30	14	2	14	49	49	0	30	
7	Știința Navrom Galați	30	13	4	13	38	49	−11	30	
8	Mecanica Vaslui	30	12	4	14	41	43	−2	28	
9	Petrolul Moinești	30	11	6	13	40	45	−5	28	
10	CSM Borzești	30	12	4	14	44	52	−8	28	
11	Proletarul Bacău	30	12	4	14	38	54	−16	28	
12	Textila Buhuși	30	13	2	15	43	67	−24	28	
13	Mecanosport Galați	30	12	2	16	52	61	−9	26	
14	Unirea Negrești	30	11	3	16	52	65	−13	25	
15	Victoria CFR Tecuci (R)	30	11	3	16	53	67	−14	25	Relegation to County Championship
16	Șantierul Naval Galați (R)	30	9	4	17	38	47	−9	22	Relegation to County Championship

Source: romaniansoccer.ro
Rules for classification: 1) Points; 2) Goal difference; 3) Number of goals scored.
(C) Champions; (P) Promoted; (R) Relegated

=== Seria III ===
Pos	Team	Pld	W	D	L	GF	GA	GD	Pts	Qualification or relegation
1	Olimpia Râmnicu Sărat (C, P)	30	21	5	4	64	11	+53	47	Promotion to Divizia B
2	Hidrotehnica Buzău	30	17	2	11	67	42	+25	36	
3	Progresul Brăila	30	15	6	9	58	36	+22	36	
4	Petrolul Brăila	30	16	3	11	63	33	+30	35	
5	Chimia Buzău	30	17	1	12	49	35	+14	35	
6	Granitul Babadag	30	15	0	15	35	45	−10	30	
7	Foresta Gugești	30	14	1	15	43	37	+6	29	
8	Celuloza Adjud	30	12	4	14	32	34	−2	28	
9	Victoria Țăndărei	30	13	2	15	46	62	−16	28	
10	Arrubium Măcin	30	13	1	16	43	43	0	27	
11	Petrolul Berca	30	12	3	15	48	53	−5	27	
12	Autobuzul Voința Odobești	30	12	3	15	27	63	−36	27	
13	Progresul Isaccea	30	12	2	16	35	54	−19	26	
14	Laminorul Brăila	30	11	3	16	38	49	−11	25	
15	Șantierul Naval CSȘ Tulcea (R)	30	11	2	17	30	57	−27	24	Relegation to County Championship
16	ASA Buzău (R)	30	8	4	18	40	64	−24	20	Relegation to County Championship

Source: romaniansoccer.ro
Rules for classification: 1) Points; 2) Goal difference; 3) Number of goals scored.
(C) Champions; (P) Promoted; (R) Relegated

=== Seria IV ===
Pos	Team	Pld	W	D	L	GF	GA	GD	Pts	Qualification or relegation
1	Unirea Slobozia (C, P)	30	22	4	4	81	20	+61	48	Promotion to Divizia B
2	Montana Sinaia	30	21	4	5	67	21	+46	46	
3	Portul Constanța	30	21	0	9	74	34	+40	42	
4	Progresul CSȘ Medgidia	30	19	3	8	57	27	+30	41	
5	Victoria Florești	30	14	3	13	45	47	−2	31	
6	Unirea Câmpina	30	14	1	15	52	41	+11	29	
7	Victoria Lehliu	30	13	3	14	47	38	+9	29	
8	Conpref Constanța	30	12	4	14	52	45	+7	28	
9	Voința ICS Medgidia	30	12	3	15	44	53	−9	27	
10	Petrolul FSH Băicoi	30	13	1	16	44	57	−13	27	
11	ISCIP Ulmeni	30	13	1	16	40	56	−16	27	
12	Olimpia Slobozia	30	11	4	15	50	50	0	26	
13	Șantierul Naval Oltenița	30	13	0	17	41	51	−10	26	
14	Viitorul Chirnogi	30	12	2	16	45	68	−23	26	
15	Unirea Urziceni (R)	30	11	3	16	50	62	−12	25	Relegation to County Championship
16	Victoria Munteni-Buzău (R)	30	1	0	29	29	137	−108	2	Relegation to County Championship

Source: romaniansoccer.ro
Rules for classification: 1) Points; 2) Goal difference; 3) Number of goals scored.
(C) Champions; (P) Promoted; (R) Relegated

=== Seria V ===
Pos	Team	Pld	W	D	L	GF	GA	GD	Pts	Qualification or relegation
1	Autobuzul București (C, P)	30	23	3	4	77	19	+58	49	Promotion to Divizia B
2	Unirea Alexandria	30	23	2	5	82	22	+60	48	
3	Victoria Giurgiu	30	18	5	7	46	23	+23	41	
4	IMGB București	30	17	4	9	56	33	+23	38	
5	Automatica București	30	14	4	12	53	48	+5	32	
6	Metalul București	30	15	2	13	61	45	+16	29 (Note: Metalul București deducted 3 points.)	
7	Dunăreana Giurgiu	30	13	3	14	48	55	−7	29	
8	ROVA Roșiori	30	13	2	15	50	50	0	28	
9	CFR BTA București	30	13	1	16	43	48	−5	27	
10	Viscofil București	30	11	5	14	49	56	−7	27	
11	ASIC București	30	10	7	13	37	50	−13	27	
12	Mecon București	30	11	4	15	47	49	−2	26	
13	Danubiana București	30	11	4	15	54	62	−8	26	
14	Chimia Victoria Turnu Măgurele	30	12	2	16	40	61	−21	26	
15	Petrolul Roata de Jos (R)	30	10	3	17	45	51	−6	23	Relegation to County Championship
16	Petrolul Poeni (R)	30	0	1	29	10	126	−116	1	Relegation to County Championship

Source: romaniansoccer.ro
Rules for classification: 1) Points; 2) Goal difference; 3) Number of goals scored.
(C) Champions; (P) Promoted; (R) Relegated

=== Seria VI ===
Pos	Team	Pld	W	D	L	GF	GA	GD	Pts	Qualification or relegation
1	Mecanică Fină București (C, P)	30	19	5	6	56	23	+33	43	Promotion to Divizia B
2	Progresul Energia București	30	18	2	10	56	28	+28	35 (Note: Progresul Energia București deducted 3 points.)	
3	Unirea Pitești	30	14	5	11	44	44	0	33	
4	Electronistul Curtea de Argeș	30	14	3	13	37	37	0	31	
5	Metalul IUM Filipeștii de Pădure	30	14	2	14	53	41	+12	30	
6	Minerul Filipeștii de Pădure	30	14	2	14	52	44	+8	30	
7	Cimentul Fieni	30	12	6	12	43	45	−2	30	
8	IUPS Chitila	30	12	6	12	36	38	−2	30	
9	Muscelul Câmpulung	30	13	4	13	37	41	−4	30	
10	ASA Chimia Brazi	30	13	3	14	40	36	+4	29	
11	Avicola Crevedia	30	12	4	14	49	53	−4	28	
12	Electrica Titu	30	12	4	14	45	52	−7	28	
13	Minerul Șotânga	30	12	3	15	34	40	−6	27	
14	Tehnometal București	30	11	5	14	30	41	−11	27	
15	Electrica Fieni (R)	30	11	3	16	31	49	−18	25	Relegation to County Championship
16	Forestierul Băbeni (R)	30	9	3	18	31	62	−31	21	Relegation to County Championship

Source: romaniansoccer.ro
Rules for classification: 1) Points; 2) Goal difference; 3) Number of goals scored.
(C) Champions; (P) Promoted; (R) Relegated

=== Seria VII ===
Pos	Team	Pld	W	D	L	GF	GA	GD	Pts	Qualification or relegation
1	Constructorul TCI Craiova (C, P)	30	18	6	6	70	16	+54	42	Promotion to Divizia B
2	Progresul Corabia	30	17	4	9	57	27	+30	38	
3	Dacia Cozia Călimănești	30	16	2	12	49	39	+10	34	
4	Constructorul Șoimii Craiova	30	15	3	12	66	44	+22	33	
5	Mecanizatorul Șimian	30	14	2	14	51	39	+12	30	
6	Viitorul CSȘ Drăgășani	30	11	8	11	37	34	+3	30	
7	Petrolul Țicleni	30	14	2	14	46	47	−1	30	
8	SM Drăgănești-Olt	30	14	2	14	44	54	−10	30	
9	Recolta Stoicănești	30	13	4	13	49	59	−10	30	
10	IOB Balș	30	12	5	13	42	37	+5	29	
11	Progresul Băilești	30	14	1	15	42	42	0	29	
12	Dierna Orșova	30	12	5	13	41	42	−1	29	
13	Petrolul Stoina	30	14	1	15	41	57	−16	29	
14	Minerul Mătăsari	30	12	4	14	43	54	−11	28	
15	Metalurgistul Sadu (R)	30	13	1	16	29	48	−19	27	Relegation to County Championship
16	Termoconstructorul Turnu Severin (R)	30	5	2	23	21	89	−68	12	Relegation to County Championship

Source: romaniansoccer.ro
Rules for classification: 1) Points; 2) Goal difference; 3) Number of goals scored.
(C) Champions; (P) Promoted; (R) Relegated

=== Seria VIII ===
Pos	Team	Pld	W	D	L	GF	GA	GD	Pts	Qualification or relegation
1	Vagonul Arad (C, P)	30	20	0	10	84	51	+33	40	Promotion to Divizia B
2	CSM Lugoj	30	18	1	11	65	39	+26	37	
3	Sânmartinu Sârbesc	30	17	1	12	63	63	0	35	
4	UM Timișoara	30	15	4	11	65	42	+23	34	
5	Unirea Tomnatic	30	15	1	14	67	57	+10	31	
6	Petrolul Arad	30	15	1	14	47	55	−8	31	
7	Strungul Chișineu-Criș	30	14	2	14	59	59	0	30	
8	Auto Energia Timișoara	30	14	1	15	47	46	+1	29	
9	Minerul Moldova Nouă	30	13	2	15	54	44	+10	28	
10	Automecanica Reșița	30	13	2	15	37	40	−3	28	
11	Motorul IMA Arad	30	13	1	16	46	57	−11	27	
12	Unirea Sânnicolau Mare	30	12	3	15	43	55	−12	27	
13	CSM Caransebeș	30	12	3	15	43	61	−18	27	
14	Minerul Anina	30	12	2	16	52	50	+2	26	
15	Minerul Oravița (R)	30	13	0	17	52	54	−2	26	Relegation to County Championship
16	CFR Victoria Caransebeș (R)	30	10	4	16	28	80	−52	24	Relegation to County Championship

Source: romaniansoccer.ro
Rules for classification: 1) Points; 2) Goal difference; 3) Number of goals scored.
(C) Champions; (P) Promoted; (R) Relegated

=== Seria IX ===
Pos	Team	Pld	W	D	L	GF	GA	GD	Pts	Qualification or relegation
1	Mureșul Explorări Deva (C, P)	30	22	3	5	67	20	+47	47	Promotion to Divizia B
2	Metalurgistul Cugir	30	16	5	9	50	30	+20	37	
3	CSU Mecanica Sibiu	30	16	1	13	47	52	−5	33	
4	Minerul Lupeni	30	14	4	12	48	43	+5	32	
5	Aurul Brad	30	14	3	13	63	38	+25	31	
6	Metalul Aiud	30	13	5	12	64	48	+16	31	
7	Minerul Știința Vulcan	30	14	2	14	50	40	+10	30	
8	Șoimii Lipova	30	14	2	14	42	50	−8	30	
9	Șoimii IPA Sibiu	30	11	6	13	50	45	+5	28	
10	Energia Săsciori	30	13	2	15	36	54	−18	28	
11	Carpați Agnita	30	12	4	14	39	60	−21	28	
12	Carpați Mârșa	30	12	3	15	55	59	−4	27	
13	Retezatul Hațeg	30	12	3	15	38	52	−14	27	
14	CFR Simeria	30	11	5	14	25	46	−21	27	
15	Textila Cisnădie (R)	30	10	6	14	54	62	−8	26	Relegation to County Championship
16	Automecanica Mediaș (R)	30	6	6	18	28	57	−29	18	Relegation to County Championship

Source: romaniansoccer.ro
Rules for classification: 1) Points; 2) Goal difference; 3) Number of goals scored.
(C) Champions; (P) Promoted; (R) Relegated

=== Seria X ===
Pos	Team	Pld	W	D	L	GF	GA	GD	Pts	Qualification or relegation
1	IMASA Sfântu Gheorghe (C, P)	30	21	3	6	67	29	+38	45	Promotion to Divizia B
2	Progresul Odorheiu Secuiesc	30	17	2	11	50	32	+18	36	
3	Rapid Miercurea Ciuc	30	16	3	11	43	32	+11	35	
4	Electro Sfântu Gheorghe	30	16	2	12	36	36	0	34	
5	Minerul Baraolt	30	15	1	14	57	42	+15	31	
6	Viitorul Gheorgheni	30	13	5	12	54	40	+14	31	
7	Nitramonia Făgăraș	30	14	2	14	64	47	+17	30	
8	Precizia Săcele	30	13	4	13	55	46	+9	30	
9	Metalul Târgu Secuiesc	30	13	4	13	50	42	+8	30	
10	Relonul Săvinești	30	13	3	14	56	54	+2	29	
11	Carpați Covasna	30	12	5	13	34	60	−26	29	
12	Metalul Sighișoara	30	13	2	15	40	48	−8	28	
13	Carpați Brașov	30	13	2	15	47	60	−13	28	
14	Unirea Cristuru Secuiesc	30	11	5	14	33	46	−13	27	
15	Minerul Bălan (R)	30	11	3	16	37	36	+1	25	Relegation to County Championship
16	Cimentul Hoghiz (R)	30	4	4	22	23	96	−73	12	Relegation to County Championship

Source: romaniansoccer.ro
Rules for classification: 1) Points; 2) Goal difference; 3) Number of goals scored.
(C) Champions; (P) Promoted; (R) Relegated

=== Seria XI ===
Pos	Team	Pld	W	D	L	GF	GA	GD	Pts	Qualification or relegation
1	Steaua CFR Cluj-Napoca (C, P)	30	18	5	7	66	24	+42	41	Promotion to Divizia B
2	Mecanica Bistrița	30	18	3	9	48	33	+15	39	
3	Mureșul Luduș	30	15	5	10	38	31	+7	35	
4	Sticla Turda	30	16	2	12	51	35	+16	34	
5	Minerul Sărmășag	30	14	5	11	43	37	+6	33	
6	Metalotehnica Târgu Mureș	30	16	0	14	56	35	+21	32	
7	Industria Sârmei Câmpia Turzii	30	13	3	14	34	37	−3	29	
8	Laminorul Victoria Zalău	30	12	4	14	45	40	+5	28	
9	Laminorul Beclean	30	13	2	15	40	54	−14	28	
10	Metalul Reghin	30	12	3	15	35	39	−4	27	
11	Izomat Șimleu Silvaniei	30	12	3	15	38	49	−11	27	
12	Chimia Năsăud	30	11	5	14	30	46	−16	27	
13	CUG Cluj-Napoca	30	11	4	15	37	36	+1	26	
14	Oțelul Reghin	30	11	4	15	36	49	−13	26	
15	Lacul Ursu Sovata (R)	30	12	1	17	29	65	−36	25	Relegation to County Championship
16	Olimpia Gherla (R)	30	9	5	16	22	40	−18	23	Relegation to County Championship

Source: romaniansoccer.ro
Rules for classification: 1) Points; 2) Goal difference; 3) Number of goals scored.
(C) Champions; (P) Promoted; (R) Relegated

=== Seria XII ===
Pos	Team	Pld	W	D	L	GF	GA	GD	Pts	Qualification or relegation
1	Someșul Satu Mare (C, P)	30	17	5	8	66	32	+34	39	Promotion to Divizia B
2	Minerul Baia Borșa	30	13	7	10	54	39	+15	33	
3	Oțelul Dr.Petru Groza	30	14	5	11	44	47	−3	33	
4	CIL Sighetu Marmației	30	14	4	12	56	39	+17	32	
5	Oașul Negrești-Oaș	30	15	2	13	59	64	−5	32	
6	Minerul Baia Sprie	30	13	4	13	48	34	+14	30	
7	Minerul Băița	30	14	2	14	49	51	−2	30	
8	Victoria Carei	30	12	6	12	44	34	+10	30	
9	Voința Oradea	30	13	3	14	53	46	+7	29	
10	Cuprom Baia Mare	30	13	3	14	50	47	+3	29	
11	Înfrățirea Oradea	30	11	7	12	45	44	+1	29	
12	Chimia Tășnad	30	13	3	14	42	52	−10	29	
13	Gloria Beiuș	30	14	1	15	53	69	−16	29	
14	Bradul Vișeu de Sus	30	12	5	13	25	52	−27	28 (Note: Bradul Vișeu de Sus deducted 1 points.)	
15	Minerul Turț (R)	30	13	2	15	40	38	+2	28	Relegation to County Championship
16	Minerul Șuncuiuș (R)	30	8	3	19	29	69	−40	19	Relegation to County Championship

Source: romaniansoccer.ro
Rules for classification: 1) Points; 2) Goal difference; 3) Number of goals scored.
(C) Champions; (P) Promoted; (R) Relegated

== See also ==
- 1988–89 Divizia A
- 1988–89 Divizia B
- 1988–89 County Championship
- 1988–89 Cupa României
