= 1995–96 Divizia C =

Third tier Romanian football league

Divizia C
- Season: 1995–96

The 1995–96 Divizia C was the 40th season of Liga III, the third tier of the Romanian football league system.

== Team changes ==
=== To Divizia C ===
Relegated from Divizia B

- Acord Focșani
- Callatis Mangalia
- Phoenix Baia Mare
- Armătura Zalău
- Faur București
- ICIM Brașov
- Flacăra Moreni
- CFR Cluj

Promoted from Divizia D

- Letea Bacău
- Zimbrul Siret
- Prod Câmpineanca
- Sportul Municipal Vaslui
- Gloria Iris Cornești
- Petrolul Teleajen Ploiești
- Precizia Săcele
- Minerul Baia Borșa
- Șoimii Compa Sibiu
- Furnirul Deta
- Minerul Ștei
- Industria Sârmei Câmpia Turzii
- Petrolul Roata de Jos
- Petrolul Drăgășani
- Minerul Certej
- Electromagnetica București

=== From Divizia C ===
Promoted to Divizia B

- Foresta Fălticeni
- Oțelul Târgoviște
- Minerul Motru
- Minaur Zlatna
- FC Onești
- Dunărea Călărași
- ARO Câmpulung
- Olimpia Satu Mare

Relegated to Divizia D

- Viitorul 94 Hârlău
- Minerul Gura Humorului
- ASA Agrojim Câmpulung Moldovenesc
- Cozinda Botoșani
- Abatorul Slobozia
- Prahova Ploiești
- Unirea Tricolor București
- Rapid Fetești
- Minerul Berbești
- Victoria Curtea de Argeș
- Arsenal Reșița
- SM Drăgănești-Olt
- Minerul Sărmășag
- Oașul Negrești-Oaș
- CPL Arad
- Avântul Reghin

=== Other changes ===
Steaua Minerul Vatra Dornei was renamed Minerul Vatra Dornei.

Constructorul Feroviar București was renamed Atletic București.

Furnirul Deta was renamed Astral Deta.

Șantierul Naval Constanța was renamed Șantierul Naval Conpref Constanța.

Prod Câmpineanca was moved from Câmpineanca to Focșani and was renamed Unirea 95 Focșani.

Viscofil București and Policolor București merged, the second one being absorbed by the first one. The new entity was named Chimia București.

Rafinăria Dărmănești took the place of Cotidian Selena Bacău.

Midia Năvodari took the place of Petrochimistul CFR Constanța.

Acvila Giurgiu and Dunărea Giurgiu merged, the first one being absorbed by the second one. The new entity was named Inter Dunărea Giurgiu.

== League tables ==
=== Seria I ===
Pos	Team	Pld	W	D	L	GF	GA	GD	Pts	Qualification or relegation
1	Petrolul Moinești (C, P)	32	24	3	5	72	20	+52	75	Promotion to Divizia B
2	Petrolul Ianca	32	19	2	11	56	48	+8	59	
3	Chimica Târnaveni	32	16	5	11	67	41	+26	53	
4	Melana Săvinești	32	17	1	14	52	50	+2	52	
5	Petrolul Berca	32	15	4	13	47	39	+8	48 (Note: Petrolul Berca deducted 1 points.)	
6	Sfântu Gheorghe	32	14	6	12	38	39	−1	48	
7	Mureșul Toplița	32	15	1	16	47	44	+3	46	
8	Rafinăria Dărmănești	32	14	3	15	46	50	−4	45	
9	Harghita Odorheiu Secuiesc	32	14	2	16	45	54	−9	44	
10	CFR Pașcani	32	13	4	15	45	51	−6	43	
11	Unirea 95 Focșani	32	14	1	17	40	48	−8	43	
12	Minerul 92 Comănești	32	13	4	15	41	42	−1	43	
13	Minerul Vatra Dornei	32	13	3	16	36	47	−11	42	
14	Vrancart Adjud	32	12	3	17	39	43	−4	39	
15	Zimbrul Siret	32	12	3	17	42	54	−12	39	
16	Letea Bacău	32	12	2	18	36	50	−14	38	
17	Acord Focșani (R)	32	11	1	20	28	48	−20	34	Relegation to Divizia D
18	Sportul Municipal Vaslui (Note: Sportul Municipal Vaslui withdrew from championship and all its results were canceled.) (D)	0	0	0	0	0	0	0	0	Withdrew
19	CFR Tepro Iași (Note: CFR Tepro Iași and Romgal Romanu were excluded from championship and all their results were canceled.) (D)	0	0	0	0	0	0	0	0	Excluded
20	Romgal Romanu (D)	0	0	0	0	0	0	0	0	Excluded

Source: romaniansoccer.ro
Rules for classification: 1) Points; 2) Goal difference; 3) Number of goals scored.
(C) Champions; (D) Disqualified; (P) Promoted; (R) Relegated

=== Seria II ===
Pos	Team	Pld	W	D	L	GF	GA	GD	Pts	Qualification or relegation
1	Danubiana București (C, P)	36	25	5	6	81	37	+44	80	Promotion to Divizia B
2	Gloria Iris Cornești	36	22	6	8	59	32	+27	72	
3	Midia Năvodari	36	17	8	11	69	47	+22	59	
4	Chimia București	36	17	5	14	40	35	+5	56	
5	Cimentul Fieni	36	18	1	17	54	45	+9	55	
6	Inter Dunărea Giurgiu	36	17	2	17	59	60	−1	53	
7	Faur București	36	15	6	15	54	39	+15	51	
8	Aversa București	36	14	9	13	50	48	+2	51	
9	Flacăra Moreni	36	15	5	16	48	42	+6	50	
10	Petrolistul Boldești	36	16	2	18	48	48	0	50	
11	Cimentul Medgidia	36	15	5	16	48	51	−3	50	
12	Callatis Mangalia	36	14	7	15	44	43	+1	49	
13	Șantierul Naval Conpref Constanța	36	15	4	17	41	44	−3	49	
14	Astra Ploiești	36	15	3	18	51	52	−1	48	
15	Electromagnetica București	36	15	3	18	47	61	−14	48	
16	Atletic București	36	15	2	19	38	55	−17	47	
17	Juventus Colentina București (R)	36	15	2	19	36	66	−30	47	Relegation to Divizia D
18	Petrolul Roata de Jos (R)	36	11	5	20	35	71	−36	38	Relegation to Divizia D
19	Petrolul Teleajen Ploiești (R)	36	9	4	23	37	63	−26	31	Relegation to Divizia D
20	Sportul Studențesc Agrariana Braniștea (Note: Sportul Studențesc Agrariana Braniștea was excluded from championship and all its results were canceled.) (D)	0	0	0	0	0	0	0	0	Excluded

Source: romaniansoccer.ro
Rules for classification: 1) Points; 2) Goal difference; 3) Number of goals scored.
(C) Champions; (D) Disqualified; (P) Promoted; (R) Relegated

=== Seria III ===
Pos	Team	Pld	W	D	L	GF	GA	GD	Pts	Qualification or relegation
1	Precizia Săcele (C, P)	38	25	5	8	70	33	+37	80	Promotion to Divizia B
2	Drobeta-Turnu Severin	38	24	4	10	80	36	+44	76	
3	Șoimii Compa Sibiu	38	23	3	12	79	40	+39	72	
4	Parângul Lonea	38	20	1	17	70	66	+4	61	
5	Minerul Mătăsari	38	19	2	17	64	50	+14	59	
6	ICIM Brașov	38	19	2	17	60	53	+7	59	
7	Petrolul Videle	38	19	2	17	53	60	−7	59	
8	Paroșeni Vulcan	38	19	1	18	56	61	−5	58	
9	Minerul Uricani	38	18	3	17	76	57	+19	57	
10	Vega Deva	38	18	3	17	71	61	+10	57	
11	Petrolul Stoina	38	19	0	19	63	62	+1	57	
12	Minerul Certej	38	18	2	18	55	54	+1	56	
13	Mine-RAL Roșia Rovinari	38	18	2	18	56	69	−13	56	
14	Minerul Lupeni	38	18	1	19	68	54	+14	55	
15	Nitramonia Făgăraș	38	17	3	18	57	56	+1	54	
16	Petrolul Țicleni	38	17	3	18	58	68	−10	54	
17	Petrolul Drăgășani (R)	38	16	3	19	58	64	−6	51	Relegation to Divizia D
18	Constructorul Craiova (R)	38	15	5	18	47	53	−6	50	Relegation to Divizia D
19	Metalurgistul Sadu (R)	38	11	3	24	31	77	−46	36	Relegation to Divizia D
20	Unirea Alexandria (R)	38	1	4	33	18	116	−98	7	Relegation to Divizia D

Source: romaniansoccer.ro
Rules for classification: 1) Points; 2) Goal difference; 3) Number of goals scored.
(C) Champions; (P) Promoted; (R) Relegated

=== Seria IV ===
Pos	Team	Pld	W	D	L	GF	GA	GD	Pts	Qualification or relegation
1	CFR Cluj (C, P)	34	26	3	5	96	20	+76	81	Promotion to Divizia B
2	Industria Sârmei Câmpia Turzii	34	25	5	4	78	31	+47	80	
3	Minerul Anina	34	21	5	8	71	36	+35	68	
4	UM Timișoara	34	19	6	9	69	27	+42	63	
5	Astral Deta	34	18	6	10	67	31	+36	60	
6	Armătura Zalău	34	17	3	14	63	54	+9	54	
7	FC Arad	34	16	4	14	58	44	+14	52	
8	Phoenix Baia Mare	34	16	3	15	83	47	+36	51	
9	West Petrom Pecica	34	16	2	16	71	85	−14	50	
10	Minerul Ștei	34	14	6	14	55	53	+2	48	
11	Minerul Baia Borșa	34	14	4	16	44	56	−12	46	
12	Motorul Arad	34	13	3	18	47	61	−14	42	
13	Sticla Arieșul Turda	34	11	7	16	47	58	−11	40	
14	Metalurgistul Cugir	34	11	7	16	37	64	−27	40	
15	Laminorul Zalău	34	12	1	21	54	89	−35	37	
16	Metalul Bocșa	34	8	4	22	36	64	−28	28	
17	Minerul Cavnic (R)	34	6	6	22	21	70	−49	24	Relegation to Divizia D
18	Olimpia Salonta (R)	34	2	5	27	21	128	−107	11	Relegation to Divizia D
19	Vulturii Lugoj (Note: Vulturii Lugoj and Sighetu Marmației were excluded from championship and all their results were canceled.) (D)	0	0	0	0	0	0	0	0	Excluded
20	Sighetu Marmației (D)	0	0	0	0	0	0	0	0	Excluded

Source: romaniansoccer.ro
Rules for classification: 1) Points; 2) Goal difference; 3) Number of goals scored.
(C) Champions; (D) Disqualified; (P) Promoted; (R) Relegated

== See also ==
- 1995–96 Divizia A
- 1995–96 Divizia B
- 1995–96 Divizia D
- 1995–96 Cupa României
