= 1986–87 Divizia C =

Third tier Romanian football league

Divizia C
- Season: 1986–87

The 1986–87 Divizia C was the 31st season of Liga III, the third tier of the Romanian football league system.

== Team changes ==
=== To Divizia C ===
Relegated from Divizia B

- Metalul Plopeni
- Muscelul Câmpulung
- CFR Timișoara
- Dunărea Călărași
- Avântul Reghin
- Unirea Alba Iulia
- Chimia Fălticeni
- Șoimii IPA Sibiu
- Înfrățirea Oradea
- Minerul Vatra Dornei
- ICSIM București
- Minerul Lupeni

Promoted from County Championship

- Metalul Botoșani
- Tepro Iași
- Gloria Galați
- Metalul IM Roman
- Letea Bacău
- Energia Focșani
- Minerul Mahmudia
- Petrolul Roata de Jos
- Victoria Lehliu
- CFR BTA București
- Minerul Șotânga
- Lotru Brezoi
- Constructorul Pitești
- Înainte Foresta Vânju Mare
- Progresul Timișoara
- Minerul Ghelari
- Târnavele Blaj
- Bihoreana Marghita
- Mecanica Bistrița
- Minerul Baia Borșa
- Silvania Cehu Silvaniei
- Automecanica Mediaș
- Metalul Reghin
- Sportul Muncitoresc Câmpina

=== From Divizia C ===
Promoted to Divizia B

- Minerul Gura Humorului
- Unirea Dinamo Focșani
- FEPA 74 Bârlad
- Unirea Slobozia
- Autobuzul București
- ROVA Roșiori
- Gloria Pandurii Târgu Jiu
- Minerul Paroșeni
- Steaua CFR Cluj-Napoca
- Unio Satu Mare
- Inter Sibiu
- Poiana Câmpina

Relegated to County Championship

- Danubiana Roman
- Celuloza Bradul Roznov
- Voința Petrolul Râmnicu Sărat
- Chimia Mărășești
- ASA Buzău
- Ancora Galați
- Marina Mangalia
- Electrica Constanța
- Flacăra Roșie București
- Constructorul IACPB Giurgiu
- Armata Craiova
- Metalul Alexandria
- Chimistul Râmnicu Vâlcea
- Forestierul Băbeni
- Minerul Certej
- Dacia Orăștie
- Voința Oradea
- Electrometal Cluj-Napoca
- Lăpușul Târgu Lăpuș
- Cuprom Baia Mare
- Mureșul Toplița
- Lacul Ursu Sovata
- Metrom Brașov
- Utilajul Făgăraș

=== Renamed teams ===
Electro Luceafărul Botoșani was renamed as Electro Botoșani.

Victoria Gugești was renamed as Foresta Gugești.

Chimia Victoria Buzău was renamed as Chimia Buzău.

Dunărea Călărași was renamed as Oțelul Călărași.

Dunărea Giurgiu was renamed as Dunăreana Giurgiu.

CFR BTA București was renamed as CFR IACP București.

Minerul Mătăsari was renamed as Minerul Jilț Mătăsari.

Jiul Rovinari was renamed as Energia Minerul Rovinari.

Mecanizatorul Șimian was renamed as Minerul Mecanizatorul Șimian.

Înainte Foresta Vânju Mare was renamed as Înainte Victoria Vânju Mare.

Rapid Arad was renamed as Vagonul Arad.

Viitorul IRA Cluj-Napoca was renamed as Motorul IRA Cluj-Napoca.

Energia Progresul Beclean was renamed as Laminorul Beclean.

Victoria Chimia Zalău was renamed as Chimia Zalău.

Sportul Muncitoresc Câmpina was renamed as Unirea Câmpina.

=== Other changes ===
Constructorul Flacăra Odobești moved to Focșani and was renamed as Constructorul Hidro Focșani.

Energia Focșani merged with Chimia Mărășești, moved to Mărășești, and was renamed as Energia Mărășești.

IMU Medgidia entered into partnership with CSȘ Medgidia and was renamed as IMU CSȘ Medgidia.

IOB Balș took the place of Viitorul Scornicești.

Chimia Brazi merged with ASA Ploiești and was renamed as ASA Chimia Ploiești.

== League tables ==
=== Seria I ===
Pos	Team	Pld	W	D	L	GF	GA	GD	Pts	Promotion or relegation
1	Siretul Pașcani (C, P)	30	21	5	4	72	18	+54	68	Promotion to Divizia B
2	Explorări Câmpulung Moldovenesc	30	21	3	6	77	20	+57	66	
3	Relonul Săvinești	30	18	2	10	69	24	+45	56	
4	Chimia Fălticeni	30	16	3	11	66	36	+30	51	
5	Metalul Rădăuți	30	14	4	12	50	31	+19	46	
6	Cetatea Târgu Neamț	30	15	1	14	35	41	−6	46	
7	Electro Botoșani	30	13	3	14	43	47	−4	42	
8	Avântul TCMM Frasin	30	13	2	15	39	56	−17	41	
9	Minerul Vatra Dornei	30	14	1	15	44	39	+5	43	
10	Carpați Gălănești	30	13	1	16	39	54	−15	40	
11	Zimbrul Siret	30	13	1	16	35	66	−31	40	
12	Constructorul Iași	30	12	3	15	43	49	−6	39	
13	Metalul Botoșani	30	12	3	15	37	44	−7	39	
14	Tepro Iași	30	12	2	16	44	61	−17	38	
15	CSM Bucecea (R)	30	11	2	17	26	69	−43	35	Relegation to County Championship
16	Cristalul Dorohoi (R)	30	3	2	25	25	89	−64	11	Relegation to County Championship

Source: romaniansoccer.ro
Rules for classification: 1) points; 2) goal difference; 3) number of goals scored.
(C) Champions; (P) Promoted; (R) Relegated

=== Seria II ===
Pos	Team	Pld	W	D	L	GF	GA	GD	Pts	Promotion or relegation
1	Inter Vaslui (C, P)	30	22	4	4	67	19	+48	70	Promotion to Divizia B
2	CSM Borzești	30	19	1	10	57	29	+28	58	
3	Textila Buhuși	30	16	1	13	61	44	+17	49	
4	Steaua Mecanica Huși	30	15	0	15	56	48	+8	45	
5	Victoria IRA Tecuci	30	14	3	13	43	45	−2	45	
6	Petrolul Moinești	30	14	2	14	37	36	+1	44	
7	DVA Portul Galați	30	14	2	14	40	47	−7	44	
8	Gloria Galați	30	14	1	15	40	42	−2	43	
9	Mecanica Vaslui	30	14	1	15	42	45	−3	43	
10	Unirea Negrești	30	13	4	13	39	58	−19	43	
11	Minerul Comănești	30	13	3	14	48	36	+12	42	
12	Laminorul Roman	30	13	3	14	28	40	−12	42	
13	Partizanul Bacău	30	13	2	15	46	41	+5	41	
14	Proletarul Bacău	30	12	3	15	30	38	−8	39	
15	Metalul IM Roman (R)	30	12	2	16	42	53	−11	38	Relegation to County Championship
16	Letea Bacău (R)	30	5	2	23	26	81	−55	17	Relegation to County Championship

Source: romaniansoccer.ro
Rules for classification: 1) points; 2) goal difference; 3) number of goals scored.
(C) Champions; (P) Promoted; (R) Relegated

=== Seria III ===
Pos	Team	Pld	W	D	L	GF	GA	GD	Pts	Promotion or relegation
1	Petrolul Ianca Brăila (C, P)	30	19	1	10	66	38	+28	58	Promotion to Divizia B
2	Luceafărul Adjud	30	17	5	8	43	23	+20	56	
3	Petrolul Berca	30	15	5	10	51	35	+16	50	
4	Șantierul Naval Tulcea	30	13	5	12	37	41	−4	44	
5	Foresta Gugești	30	12	7	11	44	36	+8	43	
6	Constructorul Hidro Focșani	30	13	4	13	29	41	−12	43	
7	Chimia Buzău	30	13	3	14	34	32	+2	42	
8	Arrubium Măcin	30	13	3	14	38	40	−2	42	
9	Chimia Brăila	30	13	3	14	37	42	−5	42	
10	Progresul Isaccea	30	13	3	14	42	48	−6	42	
11	Metalul Buzău	30	13	2	15	53	59	−6	41	
12	Carpați Nehoiu	30	13	2	15	38	43	−5	41	
13	Minerul Mahmudia	30	12	3	15	32	60	−28	39	
14	Laminorul Viziru	30	11	5	14	43	47	−4	38	
15	Energia Mărășești (R)	30	11	5	14	38	48	−10	38	Relegation to County Championship
16	Granitul Babadag (R)	30	10	2	18	33	45	−12	32	Relegation to County Championship

Source: romaniansoccer.ro
Rules for classification: 1) points; 2) goal difference; 3) number of goals scored.
(C) Champions; (P) Promoted; (R) Relegated

=== Seria IV ===
Pos	Team	Pld	W	D	L	GF	GA	GD	Pts	Promotion or relegation
1	Sportul 30 Decembrie (C, P)	30	20	4	6	66	19	+47	64	Promotion to Divizia B
2	Cimentul Medgidia	30	21	1	8	68	37	+31	64	
3	Oțelul Călărași	30	15	5	10	58	36	+22	50	
4	Metalul Mangalia	30	14	3	13	46	42	+4	45	
5	Șantierul Naval Oltenița	30	14	1	15	46	41	+5	43	
6	Olimpia Slobozia	30	14	1	15	38	48	−10	43	
7	IMU CSȘ Medgidia	30	13	3	14	50	38	+12	42	
8	Portul Constanța	30	13	1	16	50	46	+4	40	
9	ISCIP Ulmeni	30	13	1	16	34	46	−12	40	
10	Unirea Urziceni	30	13	1	16	31	60	−29	40	
11	Petrolul Roata de Jos	30	12	3	15	39	49	−10	39	
12	Viitorul Chirnogi	30	12	3	15	45	56	−11	39	
13	Dunăreana Giurgiu	30	12	2	16	36	47	−11	38	
14	Victoria Țăndărei	30	11	4	15	42	61	−19	37	
15	Victoria Lehliu (R)	30	10	7	13	42	65	−23	37	Relegation to County Championship
16	Voința Constanța (R)	30	12	2	16	50	50	0	32 (Note: Voința Constanța deducted 6 points.)	Relegation to County Championship

Source: romaniansoccer.ro
Rules for classification: 1) points; 2) goal difference; 3) number of goals scored.
(C) Champions; (P) Promoted; (R) Relegated

=== Seria V ===
Pos	Team	Pld	W	D	L	GF	GA	GD	Pts	Promotion or relegation
1	Metalul București (C, P)	30	19	3	8	50	25	+25	60	Promotion to Divizia B
2	Avicola Crevedia	30	16	3	11	40	33	+7	51	
3	Mecon București	30	14	6	10	48	33	+15	48	
4	IUPS Chitila	30	14	5	11	53	38	+15	47	
5	Electrica Titu	30	14	4	12	42	45	−3	46	
6	Viscofil București	30	14	3	13	46	39	+7	45	
7	Metalul Mija	30	13	4	13	46	40	+6	43	
8	Cimentul Fieni	30	14	1	15	51	49	+2	43	
9	Tehnometal București	30	12	6	12	43	38	+5	42	
10	Danubiana București	30	13	3	14	51	60	−9	42	
11	CFR IACP București	30	11	8	11	47	39	+8	41	
12	Minerul Șotânga	30	13	2	15	44	54	−10	41	
13	Chimia Găești	30	12	3	15	38	39	−1	39	
14	Abatorul București	30	11	6	13	39	46	−7	39	
15	Voința București (R)	30	8	6	16	26	52	−26	30	Relegation to County Championship
16	ICSIM București (R)	30	8	5	17	25	59	−34	28 (Note: ICSIM București deducted 1 point.)	Relegation to County Championship

Source: romaniansoccer.ro
Rules for classification: 1) points; 2) goal difference; 3) number of goals scored.
(C) Champions; (P) Promoted; (R) Relegated

=== Seria VI ===
Pos	Team	Pld	W	D	L	GF	GA	GD	Pts	Promotion or relegation
1	Sportul Muncitoresc Caracal (C, P)	30	20	3	7	76	30	+46	63	Promotion to Divizia B
2	Muscelul Câmpulung	30	18	3	9	58	27	+31	57	
3	Automatica Alexandria	30	16	5	9	43	27	+16	53	
4	Chimia Turnu Măgurele	30	15	6	9	41	38	+3	51	
5	Constructorul TCI Craiova	30	15	3	12	50	41	+9	48	
6	Dacia Pitești	30	14	3	13	40	36	+4	45	
7	Progresul Băilești	30	13	4	13	39	47	−8	43	
8	CFR Craiova	30	13	3	14	35	44	−9	42	
9	Recolta Stoicănești	30	12	5	13	50	34	+16	41	
10	IOB Balș	30	12	5	13	34	35	−1	41	
11	Electronistul Curtea de Argeș	30	12	3	15	39	47	−8	39	
12	Progresul Corabia	30	11	6	13	42	51	−9	39	
13	Viitorul Drăgășani	30	11	5	14	41	44	−3	38	
14	Textila Roșiori	30	10	7	13	32	52	−20	37	
15	Lotru Brezoi (R)	30	10	6	14	35	49	−14	36	Relegation to County Championship
16	Constructorul Pitești (R)	30	1	7	22	20	73	−53	10	Relegation to County Championship

Source: romaniansoccer.ro
Rules for classification: 1) points; 2) goal difference; 3) number of goals scored.
(C) Champions; (P) Promoted; (R) Relegated

=== Seria VII ===
Pos	Team	Pld	W	D	L	GF	GA	GD	Pts	Promotion or relegation
1	Gloria Reșița (C, P)	30	19	6	5	65	22	+43	63	Promotion to Divizia B
2	Minerul Motru	30	20	2	8	76	38	+38	62	
3	Minerul Oravița	30	16	2	12	59	37	+22	50	
4	Minerul Anina	30	15	3	12	62	37	+25	48	
5	Minerul Jilț Mătăsari	30	15	3	12	45	42	+3	48	
6	Minerul Moldova Nouă	30	15	1	14	47	51	−4	46	
7	Energia Minerul Rovinari	30	14	3	13	47	43	+4	45	
8	CFR Victoria Caransebeș	30	13	4	13	34	48	−14	43	
9	CSM Caransebeș	30	12	6	12	46	47	−1	42	
10	Metalul Oțelu Roșu	30	13	2	15	37	42	−5	41	
11	Petrolul Țicleni	30	11	6	13	35	41	−6	39	
12	Dierna Orșova	30	12	3	15	40	48	−8	39	
13	Metalurgistul Sadu	30	12	3	15	41	55	−14	39	
14	Minerul Mecanizatorul Șimian	30	11	4	15	41	42	−1	37	
15	Armătura Strehaia (R)	30	10	1	19	42	68	−26	31	Relegation to County Championship
16	Victoria Înainte Vânju Mare (R)	30	7	1	22	21	87	−66	22	Relegation to County Championship

Source: romaniansoccer.ro
Rules for classification: 1) points; 2) goal difference; 3) number of goals scored.
(C) Champions; (P) Promoted; (R) Relegated

=== Seria VIII ===
Pos	Team	Pld	W	D	L	GF	GA	GD	Pts	Promotion or relegation
1	Progresul Timișoara (C, P)	30	19	3	8	60	30	+30	60	Promotion to Divizia B
2	Vagonul Arad	30	16	7	7	57	34	+23	55	
3	CFR Timișoara	30	17	2	11	57	38	+19	53	
4	Obilici Sânmartinu Sârbesc	30	17	2	11	59	43	+16	51 (Note: Obilici Sânmartinu Sârbesc deducted 2 points.)	
5	Șoimii Lipova	30	15	1	14	54	58	−4	46	
6	Minerul Lupeni	30	14	4	12	50	44	+6	45 (Note: Minerul Lupeni deducted 1 point.)	
7	Unirea Sânnicolau Mare	30	14	3	13	42	47	−5	45	
8	Metalurgistul Cugir	30	14	2	14	50	36	+14	44	
9	CFR Simeria	30	13	4	13	55	48	+7	43	
10	CSM Lugoj	30	13	4	13	61	55	+6	43	
11	Unirea Tomnatic	30	13	4	13	52	53	−1	43	
12	Minerul Știința Vulcan	30	13	3	14	41	43	−2	42	
13	Strungul Chișineu-Criș	30	13	1	16	37	60	−23	40	
14	UM Timișoara	30	11	3	16	36	55	−19	36	
15	Minerul Ghelari (R)	30	8	4	18	34	60	−26	28	Relegation to County Championship
16	Victoria Călan (R)	30	5	3	22	20	61	−41	18	Relegation to County Championship

Source: romaniansoccer.ro
Rules for classification: 1) points; 2) goal difference; 3) number of goals scored.
(C) Champions; (P) Promoted; (R) Relegated

=== Seria IX ===
Pos	Team	Pld	W	D	L	GF	GA	GD	Pts	Promotion or relegation
1	Sticla Arieșul Turda (C, P)	30	22	5	3	71	16	+55	71	Promotion to Divizia B
2	Metalul Aiud	30	19	6	5	73	19	+54	63	
3	Unirea Alba Iulia	30	17	1	12	73	40	+33	52	
4	Înfrățirea Oradea	30	17	1	12	58	34	+24	52	
5	Industria Sârmei Câmpia Turzii	30	15	5	10	40	20	+20	50	
6	Oțelul Dr.Petru Groza	30	15	0	15	39	37	+2	45	
7	Recolta Salonta	30	14	1	15	52	57	−5	43	
8	Unirea Valea lui Mihai	30	13	2	15	34	62	−28	41	
9	Târnavele Blaj	30	12	4	14	34	48	−14	40	
10	Minerul Șuncuiuș	30	13	1	16	31	46	−15	40	
11	Motorul IRA Cluj-Napoca	30	12	3	15	41	67	−26	39	
12	Mecanica Alba Iulia	30	11	5	14	45	54	−9	38	
13	Gloria Beiuș	30	9	7	14	29	42	−13	34	
14	Olimpia Gherla	30	10	4	16	30	44	−14	34	
15	Bihoreana Marghita (R)	30	9	2	19	24	61	−37	29	Relegation to County Championship
16	Minerul Dr.Petru Groza (R)	30	8	1	21	19	46	−27	25	Relegation to County Championship

Source: romaniansoccer.ro
Rules for classification: 1) points; 2) goal difference; 3) number of goals scored.
(C) Champions; (P) Promoted; (R) Relegated

=== Seria X ===
Pos	Team	Pld	W	D	L	GF	GA	GD	Pts	Promotion or relegation
1	Minerul Baia Sprie (C, P)	30	22	1	7	55	29	+26	67	Promotion to Divizia B
2	Someșul Satu Mare	30	20	3	7	79	35	+44	63	
3	Victoria FIUT Carei	30	17	5	8	62	27	+35	56	
4	Minerul Băița	30	15	2	13	53	42	+11	47	
5	Chimforest Năsăud	30	14	3	13	46	56	−10	45	
6	Mecanica Bistrița	30	13	3	14	55	40	+15	42	
7	Minerul Sărmășag	30	12	4	14	34	44	−10	40	
8	Chimia Tășnad	30	12	3	15	51	46	+5	39	
9	Laminorul Beclean	30	12	3	15	44	53	−9	39	
10	Minerul Băiuț	30	13	0	17	51	61	−10	39	
11	Oașul Negrești-Oaș	30	12	2	16	52	48	+4	38	
12	Minerul Baia Borșa	30	12	2	16	35	43	−8	38	
13	Minerul Rodna	30	12	2	16	39	57	−18	38	
14	Chimia Zalău	30	11	4	15	36	47	−11	37	
15	Silvania Cehu Silvanlei (R)	30	12	1	17	36	73	−37	37	Relegation to County Championship
16	Bradul Vișeu de Sus (R)	30	10	4	16	30	57	−27	34	Relegation to County Championship

Source: romaniansoccer.ro
Rules for classification: 1) points; 2) goal difference; 3) number of goals scored.
(C) Champions; (P) Promoted; (R) Relegated

=== Seria XI ===
Pos	Team	Pld	W	D	L	GF	GA	GD	Pts	Promotion or relegation
1	Electromureș Târgu Mureș (C, P)	30	20	1	9	67	23	+44	61	Promotion to Divizia B
2	Avântul Reghin	30	19	3	8	62	27	+35	60	
3	Progresul Odorheiu Secuiesc	30	17	7	6	62	19	+43	58	
4	Șoimii IPA Sibiu	30	14	2	14	62	46	+16	44	
5	CSU Mecanica Sibiu	30	14	2	14	48	46	+2	44	
6	Mureșul Luduș	30	14	1	15	46	45	+1	43	
7	Minerul Bălan	30	13	3	14	41	55	−14	42	
8	Unirea Cristuru Secuiesc	30	14	0	16	43	59	−16	42	
9	Viitorul Gheorgheni	30	12	5	13	46	49	−3	41	
10	Metalul Sighișoara	30	13	2	15	42	51	−9	41	
11	Automecanica Mediaș	30	13	2	15	38	61	−23	41	
12	Metalul Reghin	30	12	4	14	32	28	+4	40	
13	Oțelul Reghin	30	12	4	14	39	46	−7	40	
14	Metalotehnica Târgu Mureș	30	12	3	15	45	51	−6	39	
15	Carpați Agnita (R)	30	12	3	15	33	52	−19	39	Relegation to County Championship
16	Unirea Ocna Sibiului (R)	30	7	2	21	24	72	−48	23	Relegation to County Championship

Source: romaniansoccer.ro
Rules for classification: 1) points; 2) goal difference; 3) number of goals scored.
(C) Champions; (P) Promoted; (R) Relegated

=== Seria XII ===
Pos	Team	Pld	W	D	L	GF	GA	GD	Pts	Promotion or relegation
1	Metalul Plopeni (C, P)	30	17	7	6	66	33	+33	58	Promotion to Divizia B
2	Unirea Câmpina	30	15	3	12	60	40	+20	48	
3	Metalul Târgu Secuiesc	30	15	2	13	46	32	+14	47	
4	ASA Chimia Ploiești	30	14	4	12	46	38	+8	46	
5	Victoria Florești	30	15	1	14	51	45	+6	46	
6	Nitramonia Făgăraș	30	15	0	15	53	43	+10	45	
7	Precizia Săcele	30	14	2	14	48	46	+2	44	
8	Minerul Filipeștii de Pădure	30	13	3	14	39	40	−1	42	
9	Carpați Sinaia	30	13	3	14	47	52	−5	42	
10	Minerul Baraolt	30	13	3	14	39	54	−15	42	
11	Electro Sfântu Gheorghe	30	12	5	13	48	52	−4	41	
12	Cimentul Hoghiz	30	12	5	13	34	45	−11	41	
13	Mobila Măgura Codlea	30	12	3	15	39	60	−21	39	
14	Petrolul FSH Băicoi	30	10	7	13	38	41	−3	37	
15	Torpedo Zărnești (R)	30	10	6	14	24	40	−16	36	Relegation to County Championship
16	IPT Întorsura Buzăului (R)	30	10	6	14	42	59	−17	36	Relegation to County Championship

Source: romaniansoccer.ro
Rules for classification: 1) points; 2) goal difference; 3) number of goals scored.
(C) Champions; (P) Promoted; (R) Relegated

== See also ==
- 1986–87 Divizia A
- 1986–87 Divizia B
- 1986–87 County Championship
- 1986–87 Cupa României
