= AS Sportul 30 Decembrie =

Sportul 30 Decembrie
- Full name: Asociația Sportivă Sportul 30 Decembrie
- Short name: Sportul
- Founded: 1950 as Argeșul 30 Decembrie
- Dissolved: 1992
- Ground: Comunal
- Capacity: 2,000

Asociația Sportivă Sportul 30 Decembrie, commonly known as Sportul 30 Decembrie, was a Romanian football club based in 30 Decembrie commune (now 1 Decembrie), Ilfov County.

The club was financially supported by the farm from the 30 Decembrie commune, being the first team from Ilfov County to play in the second football division in România.

== History ==
The club was founded in 1950 as Argeșul 30 Decembrie and played for almost thirty years in the regional and county championships.

At the end of the 1982–83 season, Argeșul won the Giurgiu County Championship and promoted to Divizia C.

After finishing eleventh in the first season in Divizia C, 1983–84, the club enter in partnership with Sportul Studențesc, subsequently changing its name to Sportul 30 Decembrie.

In the following two seasons, Sportul proved to be a serious contender for promotion finishing each time in 2nd place, in 1984–85 one point behind ICSIM București and in 1985–86 two points at the back of Unirea Slobozia.

At the end of the 1986–87 season, with Nicolae Tănăsescu as head coach, Sportul 30 Decembrie promoted for the first time on the second division, at the goal difference, after a dramatic duel until the last round with Cimentul Medgidia. The squad was composed of: Dumitru Iordan, Adam – goalkeepers; Mihăilescu, Cristian Barbu, Alexandru Lazăr, Dorel Ciobanu, Paul Dumitru, Niculescu, Stănescu – defenders; Cristian Niță, Ion Pop, Pîslaru, Nignea, Constantin Covaciu, Pîrvan, Marinescu, Mărgelatu – midfielders; Aurel Vișinoiu, Neagu, G. Dumitru, Huțanu, Rădulescu – forwards.

In Divizia B, with a new coach, Romulus Chihaia, former player of Sportul Studențesc, the team from the small locality near Bucharest finished, two consecutive seasons (1987–88 and 1988–89), on the 6th place.

Two more good seasons follow, each time in the first part of the standings, 5th - 1989–90 and 4th - 1990–91.

The following season, 1991–92, had Sportul 30 Decembrie relegated, as they managed five victories and finished on the last position in 2nd series of the second division.

Following relegation, the club merged with the newly promoted in Divizia C, from Giurgiu County Championship, Rapid Braniștea, forming Sportul Studențesc Agrarian Braniștea.

During all these years, many young promising footballers or some at the end of their careers were loaned from Sportul Studențesc: such as Cristian Petre, Gabriel Răduță, Gabriel Prodan, Cătălin Necula, Florin Motroc, Daniel Dumitrescu, Hristu Mihale, Marin Ivașcu, Imilian Șerbănică.

== Honours ==
Divizia C

- Winners (1): 1986–87
- Runners-up (2): 1984–85, 1985–86

Giurgiu County Championship

- Winners (1): 1982–83

== League history ==
Season	Tier	Division	Place	Notes	Cupa României
1991–92	2	Divizia B (Seria I)	18th	Relegated	
1990–91	2	Divizia B (Seria II)	4th		
1989–90	2	Divizia B (Seria II)	5th		
1988–89	2	Divizia B (Seria II)	6th		
1987–88	2	Divizia B (Seria II)	6th		

Season	Tier	Division	Place	Notes	Cupa României
1986–87	3	Divizia C (Seria IV)	1st (C)	Promoted	
1985–86	3	Divizia C (Seria V)	2nd		
1984–85	3	Divizia C (Seria V)	2nd		
1983–84	3	Divizia C (Seria V)	11th		
1982–83	4	County Championship (GR)	1st (C)	Promoted	
