= Sportul Municipal Vaslui =

Romanian football club

- Full name: Sportul Municipal Vaslui
- Nickname(s): Vasluienii (The Vaslui People)
- Short name: Vaslui
- Founded: 1950 as 6 Martie Vaslui
- Dissolved: 2002
- Ground: Municipal
- Capacity: 9,240

Sportul Municipal Vaslui, commonly known as SM Vaslui, or simply as Vaslui, was a Romanian football club based in Vaslui, Vaslui County. The club was founded in 1950 and over time underwent several name changes, such as 6 Martie, Progresul, Viitorul, Viitorul Mecanica, Mecanica, and Marvas. For three decades, from the 1970s through the 1990s, the team regularly competed in the second and third divisions of Romanian football.

== History ==
Organized football in Vaslui dates back to the 1950 with the establishment of the "6 Martie" team, named after 6 March 1945, the date of the first communist government led by Petru Groza. Its home ground was located within the courtyard of the 25th Infantry Regiment, and the team initially competed in the Bârlad Regional Championship. In 1960, it was renamed "Progresul IER", being financially sustained by the Întreprinderea Economică Raională (lit. 'District Economic Enterprise') and played in the Iași Regional Championship.

Progresul won the 1958–59 season of the Iași Regional Championship, but due to the shutdown of Divizia C and the fact that no teams were promoted, Progresul stayed in the regional competition.

In 1968, the team was taken over by the Furniture Factory from Vaslui, renamed Viitorul, and played in the first season of the Vaslui County Championship. The team finished in 2nd place and won the following season but lost the promotion play-off against Olimpia Râmnicu Sărat, the winner of the Buzău County Championship, 0–1 on aggregate.

Led by Nicolae Oancea, Viitorul promoted to the third division at the end of the 1970–71 season, winning the county title for the second time and securing promotion without a play-off due to the expansion of Divizia C.

In their first season in Divizia C, Viitorul finished in a respectable 6th place in Series II. The following season, Viitorul achieved promotion to Divizia B, finishing in 1st place, tied on points with Petrolul Moinești but with a better goal difference. Both teams were promoted to Divizia B following the expansion of the second division. The squad during this period included players such as Dumitru, Renghel, Iolea, V. Grigoraș, Dan Petraru, Rusu, Viorel Țonea, Angheluță, Constantin Ion, M. Grigoraș, Dorobăț, Ursulescu, Bejan, Obreja, Lupu, Străoanu, Dăniciuc, Duțu, Grigore, Mărgărit, Albu, Nicușor Frunză, Tiron, and Vasiliu.

In the second division, Viitorul stayed for only one season, finishing 15th, tied on points with Constructorul Galați, and was relegated due to goal difference. However, the team successfully returned to Divizia B the following season, once again winning Series II, finishing 6 points ahead of their rival from two seasons earlier, Petrolul Moinești.

Viitorul relegated once again, finishing 17th out of 18 in the 1975–76 season of Divizia B, but managed to bounce back the following year, winning Series II of the third division for the third time in the 1976–77 season.

During their most successful period in Divizia B, the team achieved solid results: 10th place in the 1977–78 season, 5th in 1978–79, 6th in 1979–80, and 14th in both the 1980–81 and 1981–82 seasons. In the summer of 1982, the team was taken over by the Vaslui Mechanical Plant and renamed Viitorul Mecanica Vaslui. However, the change did not improve performance, as they were relegated to Divizia C at the end of the 1982–83 season.

In 1983, the club dropped 'Viitorul' from its name and remained as Mecanica Vaslui. In the same year, Inter Vaslui, newly promoted from the County Championship, began to rise, sparking a great rivalry between the two teams. This rivalry intensified in 1988 when Inter adopted Mecanica's former name, Viitorul.

Chronology of names
Name	Period
6 Martie Vaslui	1950–1960
Progresul Vaslui	1960–1968
Viitorul Vaslui	1968–1982
Viitorul Mecanica Vaslui	1982–1983
Mecanica Vaslui	1983–1991
Marvas Vaslui	1991–1993
Sportul Municipal Vaslui	1993–2002

Mecanica continued to play in Series II of Divizia C without notable results in the following years: 5th place in the 1983–84 season, 2nd place in the 1984–85 season behind CSM Borzești, and 3rd place in the 1985–86 season behind Unirea Dinamo Focșani and Inter Vaslui, 9th in the 1986–87 season, 2nd place in the 1987–88 season, 8th in the 1988–89 season, 7th in Series I of the 1989–90 season, and 11th in Series II of 1990–91 season.

In the summer of 1991, another name change occurred, and the club became Marvas Vaslui. In the 1991–92 season, the club finished in 4th place in Series III, the last position that allowed them to remain in the third division after the reduction in the number of teams following the reorganization of the competition system.

In 1992, the team was taken over by the Vaslui Municipality and was renamed Sportul Municipal. The club finished the 1992–93 season in 18th place out of 20 in Series I of Divizia C, resulting in relegation.

After two seasons in the fourth division, Sportul Municipal won the 1994–95 edition of Divizia D – Vaslui County and earned promotion to Divizia C by defeating Șantierul Naval Galați, the Divizia D – Galați County winner, in the promotion play-off with a categorical 12–1 on aggregate. However, the club encountered financial problems and withdrew during the 1995–96 season, leading to another return to the county championship. Also, "Vasluienii" reached the Round of 32 of Cupa României in the 1995–96 season, being eliminated by FC Argeș 1–3.

The 1997–98 season brought another county championship title for Sportul Municipal Vaslui, but promotion to Divizia C slipped away after a narrow 2–3 loss to Unirea Botoșani in the play-off. Undeterred, the team claimed the county championship again in the 1998–99 season and this time secured direct promotion to Divizia C, where it competed for the next three consecutive seasons, finishing 11th (1999–2000), 12th (2000–01), and 4th (2001–02). The financial problems led to the dissolution of the club in the summer of 2002, paving the way for FC Vaslui.

== Honours ==
Divizia C

- Winners (3): 1972–73, 1974–75, 1976–77
- Runners-up (2): 1984–85, 1987–88

Vaslui County Championship

- Winners (5): 1969–70, 1970–71, 1994–95, 1997–98, 1998–99
- Runners-up (1): 1968–69

Iași Regional Championship

- Winners (1): 1958–59

== Former managers ==
- (Romania) Nicolae Oaidă (1981–1982)

== League history ==
Season	Tier	Division	Place	Notes	Cupa României
2001–02	3	Divizia C (Seria I)	4th	Disbanded	
2000–01	3	Divizia C (Seria I)	12th		
1999–00	3	Divizia C (Seria I)	11th		
1998–99	4	Divizia D (VS)	1st (C)	Promoted	
1997–98	4	Divizia D (VS)	1st (C)		
1996–97	4	Divizia D (VS)			
1995–96	3	Divizia C (Seria I)	17th	Withdrew	Round of 32
1994–95	4	Divizia D (VS)	1st (C)	Promoted	
1993–94	4	Divizia D (Seria IV)			
1992–93	4	Divizia C (Seria I)	18th	Relegated	
1991–92	3	Divizia C (Seria III)	4th		
1990–91	3	Divizia C (Seria II)	11th		

Season	Tier	Division	Place	Notes	Cupa României
1989–90	3	Divizia C (Seria I)	7th		
1988–89	3	Divizia C (Seria II)	8th		
1987–88	3	Divizia C (Seria II)	2nd		
1986–87	3	Divizia C (Seria II)	9th		
1985–86	3	Divizia C (Seria II)	3rd		
1984–85	3	Divizia C (Seria II)	2nd		
1983–84	3	Divizia C (Seria II)	5th		
1982–83	2	Divizia B (Seria I)	17th	Relegated	
1981–82	2	Divizia B (Seria I)	14th		
1980–81	2	Divizia B (Seria I)	14th		
1979–80	2	Divizia B (Seria I)	6th		
1978–79	2	Divizia B (Seria I)	5th		
