= 1987–88 Divizia B =

Divizia B
- Season: 1987–88
- Country: Romania
- Teams: 54 (3x18)
- Promoted: FC Constanța; Inter Sibiu; Bihor Oradea
- Relegated: Inter Vaslui; Autobuzul București; Sticla Arieșul Turda; Unirea Slobozia; Mecanică Fină București; CIL Sighetu Marmației; Olimpia Râmnicu Sărat; Metalul București; Minerul Baia Sprie; Petrolul Ianca; Progresul Vulcan București; Victoria Carei

The 1987–88 Divizia B was the 48th season of the second tier of the Romanian football league system.

The format has been maintained to three series, each of them having 18 teams. At the end of the season, the winners of the series are promoted to Divizia A and the last four places from each series are relegated to Divizia C.

== Team changes ==
=== To Divizia B ===
Promoted from Divizia C

- Siretul Pașcani
- Inter Vaslui
- Petrolul Ianca Brăila
- Sportul 30 Decembrie
- Metalul București
- Sportul Muncitoresc Caracal
- Gloria Reșița
- Progresul Timișoara
- Sticla Arieșul Turda
- Minerul Baia Sprie
- Electromureș Târgu Mureș
- Metalul Plopeni

Relegated from Divizia A

- Jiul Petroșani
- Gloria Buzău
- Chimia Râmnicu Vâlcea

=== From Divizia B ===
Relegated to Divizia C

- Aripile Victoria Bacău
- ROVA Roșiori
- Aurul Brad
- Minerul Gura Humorului
- Carpați Mârșa
- Mureșul Deva
- Dunărea CSU Galați
- Automatica București
- Steaua CFR Cluj
- Poiana Câmpina
- IMASA Sfântu Gheorghe
- Minerul Cavnic

Promoted to Divizia A

- CSM Suceava
- ASA Târgu Mureș
- Politehnica Timișoara

=== Renamed teams ===
MF Steaua București was renamed as Mecanică Fină București.

Minerul Paroșeni was renamed as AS Paroșeni Vulcan.

Petrolul Ianca Brăila was renamed as Petrolul Ianca.

== League tables ==
=== Serie I ===
Pos	Team	Pld	W	D	L	GF	GA	GD	Pts	Promotion or relegation
1	FC Constanța (C, P)	34	19	11	4	63	27	+36	49	Promotion to Divizia A
2	Politehnica Iași	34	16	8	10	62	35	+27	40	
3	Progresul Brăila	34	16	7	11	62	45	+17	39	
4	Prahova CSU Ploiești	34	15	7	12	44	36	+8	37	
5	Unirea Dinamo Focșani	34	16	5	13	42	48	−6	37	
6	CFR Pașcani	34	16	4	14	61	43	+18	36	
7	Siretul Pașcani	34	17	2	15	47	50	−3	36	
8	Gloria Buzău	34	13	8	13	61	45	+16	34	
9	Ceahlăul Piatra Neamț	34	14	6	14	54	42	+12	34	
10	Steaua Mizil	34	16	2	16	53	56	−3	34	
11	Delta Dinamo Tulcea	34	15	4	15	42	48	−6	34	
12	Metalul Plopeni	34	15	4	15	46	53	−7	34	
13	FEPA 74 Bârlad	34	13	7	14	47	44	+3	33	
14	CS Botoșani	34	14	5	15	52	51	+1	33	
15	Inter Vaslui (R)	34	14	5	15	31	42	−11	33	Relegation to Divizia C
16	Unirea Slobozia (R)	34	12	6	16	43	51	−8	30	Relegation to Divizia C
17	Olimpia Râmnicu Sărat (R)	34	13	2	19	33	60	−27	28	Relegation to Divizia C
18	Petrolul Ianca (R)	34	3	5	26	32	99	−67	11	Relegation to Divizia C

Source: romaniansoccer.ro (in Romanian)
Rules for classification: 1) Points; 2) Goal difference; 3) Goals scored; 4) Head-to-head points; 5) Head-to-head goal difference; 6) Head-to-head goals scored; 7) Head-to-head away goals scored.
(C) Champions; (P) Promoted; (R) Relegated

=== Serie II ===
Pos	Team	Pld	W	D	L	GF	GA	GD	Pts	Promotion or relegation
1	Inter Sibiu (C, P)	34	23	5	6	62	27	+35	51	Promotion to Divizia A
2	Jiul Petroșani	34	21	2	11	62	36	+26	44	
3	Gloria Pandurii Târgu Jiu	34	17	6	11	53	38	+15	40	
4	Electroputere Craiova	34	19	1	14	76	41	+35	39	
5	Tractorul Brașov	34	17	3	14	50	39	+11	37	
6	Sportul 30 Decembrie	34	17	3	14	37	35	+2	37	
7	CS Târgoviște	34	15	5	14	48	44	+4	35	
8	Chimia Râmnicu Vâlcea	34	14	6	14	46	45	+1	34	
9	ICIM Brașov	34	14	6	14	42	42	0	34	
10	Gaz Metan Mediaș	34	16	2	16	50	52	−2	34	
11	Drobeta-Turnu Severin	34	13	8	13	45	52	−7	34	
12	Sportul Muncitoresc Slatina	34	14	5	15	38	43	−5	33	
13	Electromureș Târgu Mureș	34	13	7	14	42	51	−9	33	
14	Sportul Muncitoresc Caracal	34	14	5	15	45	55	−10	33	
15	Autobuzul București (R)	34	12	8	14	36	43	−7	32	Relegation to Divizia C
16	Mecanică Fină București (R)	34	12	6	16	35	55	−20	30	Relegation to Divizia C
17	Metalul București (R)	34	6	6	22	33	66	−33	18	Relegation to Divizia C
18	Progresul Vulcan București (R)	34	5	4	25	25	61	−36	14	Relegation to Divizia C

Source: romaniansoccer.ro (in Romanian)
Rules for classification: 1) Points; 2) Goal difference; 3) Goals scored; 4) Head-to-head points; 5) Head-to-head goal difference; 6) Head-to-head goals scored; 7) Head-to-head away goals scored.
(C) Champions; (P) Promoted; (R) Relegated

=== Serie III ===
Pos	Team	Pld	W	D	L	GF	GA	GD	Pts	Promotion or relegation
1	Bihor Oradea (C, P)	34	21	8	5	85	28	+57	50	Promotion to Divizia A
2	Gloria Bistrița	34	21	6	7	77	23	+54	48	
3	UTA Arad	34	19	5	10	60	31	+29	43	
4	Maramureș Baia Mare	34	15	6	13	43	32	+11	36	
5	CSM Reșița	34	16	4	14	34	40	−6	36	
6	Olimpia Satu Mare	34	14	6	14	57	41	+16	34	
7	Paroșeni Vulcan	34	15	3	16	51	48	+3	33	
8	Strungul Arad	34	14	5	15	40	41	−1	33	
9	Progresul Timișoara	34	14	5	15	48	52	−4	33	
10	Metalul Bocșa	34	13	7	14	42	46	−4	33	
11	Mecanica Orăștie	34	14	5	15	42	49	−7	33	
12	Armătura Zalău	34	13	7	14	36	46	−10	33	
13	Gloria Reșița	34	14	4	16	48	53	−5	32	
14	Chimica Târnăveni	34	14	4	16	45	68	−23	32	
15	Sticla Arieșul Turda (R)	34	14	2	18	41	60	−19	30	Relegation to Divizia C
16	CIL Sighetu Marmației (R)	34	11	5	18	37	62	−25	27	Relegation to Divizia C
17	Minerul Baia Sprie (R)	34	10	4	20	34	71	−37	24	Relegation to Divizia C
18	Victoria Carei (R)	34	9	4	21	25	54	−29	22	Relegation to Divizia C

Source: romaniansoccer.ro (in Romanian)
Rules for classification: 1) Points; 2) Goal difference; 3) Goals scored; 4) Head-to-head points; 5) Head-to-head goal difference; 6) Head-to-head goals scored; 7) Head-to-head away goals scored.
(C) Champions; (P) Promoted; (R) Relegated

== See also ==
- 1987–88 Divizia A
