= CIL Sighetu Marmației =

- Full name: Asociația Sportivă CIL Sighetu Marmației
- Short name: CIL Sighet
- Founded: 1936
- Dissolved: 1991
- Ground: Marmația
- Capacity: 5,000

Asociația Sportivă CIL Sighetu Marmației, commonly known as CIL Sighetu Marmației, was a Romanian football club based in Sighetu Marmației, being one of the top teams of the Maramureș County during the Communist regime, alongside FC Baia Mare and Minerul Cavnic.

== History ==
=== Early days ===
In 1936, along with the foundation of Divizia C, it was created the first football club from Sighetu Marmației, named Maramureșul. After the dissolution of the third tier of Romanian football, Maramureșul continued to play in regional football leagues.

When the Second World War ended, the team was renamed Tisa Sighet, after the river Tisa, which separates Sighet from Solotvyno village found in Ukraine. After the best Divizia C season since foundation, the team won the promotion to Liga II, but relegates after just one season back to the third tier, being renamed C.F.R..

After another season, Liga III was again dissolved, but, after six years, the competition was re-founded and the Sighet-based team played again under a new name : Recolta. In the following years, the team is renamed several times: Tisa, then Stăruința and Foresta.

In 1966, the team, under the name Forestiera Sighet, relegates into regional championship.

=== CIL Sighet ===
At the end of the 1967–68 season, the team won promotion to Divizia C and changed its name for the last time to CIL (Combinatul de Industrializare a Lemnului, “Wood Industrialization Combine”) Sighetu Marmației, after the wood-processing factory based in the town.

The 1974–75 season saw CIL Sighet winning the Series X of Divizia C and the promotion to Divizia B for the second time. The first second division season after twenty-seven years seals the club's best performance ever: the 5th position in the Romanian second tier. After only three seasons, the team relegates again to Divizia C, but gains the promotion after only a season.

The team spent another three seasons in Series III of Divizia B, ranking 7th in 1980–81 and 8th in 1981–82, before being relegated at the end of the 1982–83 season, when it finished 15th. Bounced back in Divizia C, CIL competed in Series X, finishing 3rd in the 1983–84 season and laying the groundwork for a strong comeback.

The 1984–85 season proved highly successful, as CIL won the series and returned to the second division under head coach Dorel Cupșa. The team also made an impressive run in Cupa României, defeating first-division side Bihor Oradea (2–0) and second-division Dinamo Victoria București (1–0) before being eliminated by Politehnica Iași in the quarter-finals. The squad featured, among others, Verdeș, Petreuș, Țiplea, Grindeanu, L. Ciohan, Cheaua, Negrea, Bonte, G. Pop, I. Pop, Strîmbei, Szekely, Șulea, Drăgulescu, Z. Ciohan, Matei, and Caciureac, who left during the winter break to join first-division side FC Baia Mare. During that campaign, CIL also played in the third division for the first time against another Sighet-based club, ISSM Sighetu Marmației, the team of the local screw factory.

Once promoted, the club spent another three seasons in Series III of Divizia B, ranking 7th in 1985–86, 12th in 1986–87 and 16th in 1987–88, which resulted in relegation to Divizia C.

=== Dissolution ===
In the lower tier, the team finished 4th in Series XII in 1988–89 and then won the series in 1989–90, earning another promotion to the second division. However, after the Romanian Revolution, which marked the fall of communism, the club lost its financial support and struggled to survive. Relegated again to the third division after the 1990–91 campaign, CIL Sighet, alongside Oașul Negrești-Oaș and Rapid Jibou, withdrew from the championship at the beginning of the 1991–92 season and subsequently disappeared.

== Honours ==
Divizia C

- Winners (4): 1974–75, 1979–80, 1984–85, 1989–90

Maramureș Regional Championship

- Winners (1): 1963–64
- Runners-up (2): 1955, 1959–60

== Notable former players ==
- (Romania) Grigore Arezanov
- (Romania) Vasile Caciureac
- (Romania) Iosif Roman
- (Romania) Emerich Dembrovschi
- (Romania) Dănuț Matei

== Former managers ==
- (Romania) Virgil Codrea
- (Romania) Dorel Cupșa
- (Romania) Emilian Avasilichioaie
- (Romania) Mihai Culda
