= 1989–90 County Championship =

48th season of the Liga IV, the fourth tier of the Romanian football league

Liga IV
- Season: 1989–90

The 1989–90 County Championship was the 48th season of the Liga IV, the fourth tier of the Romanian football league system. The champions of each county association play against one from a neighboring county in a play-off to gain promotion to 1990–91 Divizia C.

== County championships ==
- Alba (AB)
- Arad (AR)
- Argeș (AG)
- Bacău (BC)
- Bihor (BH)
- Bistrița-Năsăud (BN)
- Botoșani (BT)
- Brașov (BV)
- Brăila (BR)
- Bucharest (B)
- Buzău (BZ)
- Caraș-Severin (CS)
- Călărași (CL)
- Cluj (CJ)
- Constanța (CT)
- Covasna (CV)
- Dâmbovița (DB)
- Dolj (DJ)
- Galați (GL)
- Giurgiu (GR)
- Gorj (GJ)
- Harghita (HR)
- Hunedoara (HD)
- Ialomița (IL)
- Iași (IS)
- Ilfov (IF)
- Maramureș (MM)
- Mehedinți (MH)
- Mureș (MS)
- Neamț (NT)
- Olt (OT)
- Prahova (PH)
- Satu Mare (SM)
- Sălaj (SJ)
- Sibiu (SB)
- Suceava (SV)
- Teleorman (TR)
- Timiș (TM)
- Tulcea (TL)
- Vaslui (VS)
- Vâlcea (VL)
- Vrancea (VN)

== Promotion play-off ==
Teams promoted to Divizia C without a play-off matches as teams from less represented counties in the third division.

- (MH) Armătura Strehaia
- (IL) Unirea Urziceni
- (TL) Fortuna Tulcea
- (GR) Știința Băneasa
- (AB) Mecanica Alba Iulia
- (BT) Cristalul Dorohoi

The matches were played on 8 and 15 July 1990.

Team 1	Agg.	Team 2	1st leg	2nd leg
Letea Bacău (BC)	4–6	(GL) Metalurgistul Tecuci	4–1	0–5
Electrodul Slatina (OT)	2–3	(VL) Minerul Berbești	0–2	2–1
Rulmentul Alexandria (TR)	4–1	(CL) Victoria UJCC Călărași	2–0	2–1
Steaua Târgoviște (DB)	3–2	(CV) IPT Întorsura Buzăului	2–0	1–2
CFR Arad (AR)	3–2	(TM) Electromotor Timișoara	3–0	0–2
Minerul Uricani (HD)	3–1	(CS) Minerul Oravița	3–0	0–1
Olimpia Salonta (BH)	1–3	(SM) Minerul Turț	1–0	0–3
Rapid Jibou (SJ)	2–3	(MM) Unirea Seini	0–2	2–1
Voința Roman (NT)	6–2	(SV) Unirea Emil Bodnăraș	6–0	0–2
Energia Iernut (MS)	2–5	(HR) Minerul Bălan	2–0	0–5
Metalul Buzău (BZ)	3–2	(VN) IPREROM Doaga	2–2	1–0
Litoral Mangalia (CT)	4–0	(IF) IAB Pantelimon	1–0	3–0
Automobilul Însurăței (BR)	2–6	(PH) Carpați Sinaia	0–2	2–4
Hebe Sângeorz-Băi (BN)	1–5	(CJ) Electrometal Cluj-Napoca	1–1	0–4
Automecanica Mediaș (SB)	–	(BV) Torpedo Zărnești	1–1	1–3
Minerul Rovinari (GJ)	4–4 (Note: Jiul IEELIF Craiova won on the away goals rule.)	(DJ) Jiul IEELIF Craiova	4–2	0–2
Voința București (B)	6–1	(AG) Foresta CPL Pitești	2–0	4–1
Loctrans Iași (IS)	–	(VS) Unirea Abrom Bârlad	–	–

== Championship standings ==
=== Arad County ===
Pos	Team	Pld	W	D	L	GF	GA	GD	Pts	Qualification or relegation
1	CFR Arad (C, Q)	38	27	6	5	91	25	+66	60	Qualification to promotion play-off
2	Progresul Pecica	38	26	4	8	88	43	+45	56	
3	Olimpia ISD Arad	38	20	4	14	79	51	+28	44	
4	Gloria Arad	38	19	5	14	65	53	+12	43	
5	Pielarul Arad	38	18	5	15	67	48	+19	41	
6	Victoria Nădlac	38	18	5	15	65	48	+17	41	
7	Victoria Felnac	38	18	3	17	64	52	+12	39	
8	Mureșul Zădăreni	38	17	5	16	61	68	−7	39	
9	Unirea Șofronea	38	18	1	19	88	74	+14	37	
10	Crișana Sebiș	38	16	5	17	68	69	−1	37	
11	Metalul Ineu	38	14	9	15	60	70	−10	37	
12	Banatul Vinga	38	15	7	16	38	54	−16	37	
13	Vânători	38	15	6	17	62	59	+3	36	
14	Stăruința Dorobanți	38	15	6	17	48	53	−5	36	
15	Frontiera Curtici	38	15	6	17	62	68	−6	36	
16	Victoria Ineu	38	14	8	16	51	65	−14	36	
17	Șoimii Pâncota	38	15	5	18	48	65	−17	35	Relegation to Arad County Championship II
18	Voința Macea	38	15	3	20	45	64	−19	33	Relegation to Arad County Championship II
19	Explormin Hălmagiu	38	9	3	26	39	86	−47	21	Relegation to Arad County Championship II
20	Dacia Beliu	38	7	2	29	40	112	−72	16	Relegation to Arad County Championship II

Rules for classification: 1) Points; 2) Goal difference; 3) Number of goals scored.
(C) Champions; (Q) Qualified for the phase indicated

=== Neamț County ===
Pos	Team	Pld	W	D	L	GF	GA	GD	Pts	Qualification or relegation
1	Voința Roman (C, Q)	26	21	1	4	86	17	+69	43	Qualification to promotion play-off
2	CPL Piatra Neamț	26	13	8	5	46	33	+13	34	
3	Celuloza ITA Piatra Neamț	26	13	7	6	45	27	+18	33	
4	Voința Cauciucul Târgu Neamț	26	13	7	6	40	37	+3	33	
5	Cimentul Bicaz	26	14	3	9	50	35	+15	31	
6	Mobila Târgu Neamț	26	13	5	8	55	27	+28	29 (Note: Mobila Târgu Neamț deducted 2 points.)	
7	Energia Săbăoani	26	12	2	12	53	65	−12	26	
8	Bradul Roznov	26	10	4	12	41	36	+5	24	
9	IM Piatra Neamț	26	9	4	13	43	47	−4	22	
10	Rapid Piatra Neamț	26	8	3	15	33	50	−17	19	
11	AZO-TCM Săvinești	26	7	5	14	33	56	−23	19	
12	Voința Piatra Neamț	26	8	2	16	30	58	−28	18	
13	Danubiana Roman (D)	26	6	4	16	33	40	−7	16 (Note: Danubiana Roman and Recolta Dulcești withdrew in the second half and lost all remaining matches with 0–3.)	Withdrew
14	Recolta Dulcești (D)	26	5	1	20	31	82	−51	11	Withdrew

Rules for classification: 1) Points; 2) Goal difference; 3) Number of goals scored.
(C) Champions; (D) Disqualified; (Q) Qualified for the phase indicated

=== Prahova County ===
Pos	Team	Pld	W	D	L	GF	GA	GD	Pts	Qualification or relegation
1	Carpați Sinaia (Q)	34	22	3	9	81	25	+56	47	Qualification to promotion play-off
2	Chimistul Valea Călugărească	34	16	9	9	59	39	+20	41	
3	Geamul Scăeni	34	17	5	12	51	41	+10	39	
4	Vega Ploiești	34	15	9	10	53	39	+14	39	
5	Petrolistul Boldești	34	14	10	10	44	30	+14	38	
6	Precizia Breaza	34	15	4	15	40	39	+1	34	
7	Caraimanul Bușteni	34	14	7	13	39	40	−1	35	
8	AEI Urlați	34	14	7	13	48	51	−3	35	
9	IUC Ploiești	34	13	9	12	49	53	−4	35	
10	Avântul Mâneciu	34	14	4	16	42	49	−7	32	
11	Carotajul Ploiești	34	13	7	14	39	46	−7	33	
12	Oțelul Câmpina	34	13	8	13	40	43	−3	32 (Note: Oțelul Câmpina and Electromontaj Câmpina were deducted 2 points.)	
13	Energia Bucov	34	12	8	14	52	49	+3	32	
14	Viitorul Pleașa	34	15	3	16	56	64	−8	33 (Note: Viitorul Pleașa deducted 4 points.)	
15	Rafinorul Ploiești	34	12	7	15	45	47	−2	31	
16	Electromontaj Câmpina	34	11	7	16	40	55	−15	27	
17	Vulturul Băicoi (R)	34	11	5	18	40	78	−38	27	Relegation to Prahova County Championship II
18	Feroemail Ploiești (R)	34	7	5	22	35	65	−30	19	Relegation to Prahova County Championship II

Rules for classification: 1) Points; 2) Goal difference; 3) Number of goals scored.
(Q) Qualified for the phase indicated; (R) Relegated

=== Timiș County ===
Series I

Pos	Team	Pld	W	D	L	GF	GA	GD	Pts	Qualification or relegation
1	Electromotor Timișoara (Q)	42	32	3	7	124	33	+91	67	Qualification to championship final
2	Modern Timișoara	42	27	4	11	85	38	+47	58	
3	Flacăra Făget	42	22	7	13	71	59	+12	51	
4	Electrobanat Timișoara	42	23	4	15	61	48	+13	50	
5	Laminorul Nădrag	42	22	5	15	99	59	+40	49	
6	Calapoade Lugoj	42	22	5	15	91	71	+20	49	
7	Mănușarul Timișoara	42	22	5	15	74	63	+11	49	
8	Șoimii Timișoara	42	21	6	15	71	56	+15	48	
9	Timpuri Noi Giarmata	42	21	5	16	84	63	+21	47	
10	Victoria Timișoara	42	21	4	17	90	74	+16	46	
11	IJPIPS Timișoara	42	19	8	15	70	61	+9	46	
12	Bega Belinț	42	22	1	19	80	65	+15	45	
13	Azur Timișoara	42	20	4	18	76	62	+14	44	
14	TCI Timișoara	42	18	6	18	72	66	+6	42	
15	SMTCF Lugoj	42	18	5	19	69	51	+18	41	
16	Șoimii Buziaș	42	19	3	20	71	73	−2	41	
17	IUPS Lugoj	42	16	6	20	68	73	−5	38	
18	Recaș	42	14	4	24	60	77	−17	32	
19	IRA Timișoara	42	10	4	28	48	98	−50	24	
20	Progresul Gătaia	42	9	4	29	48	137	−89	22	
21	Foresta Nădrag	42	8	1	33	39	125	−86	17	
22	Timișul Jabăr	42	6	4	32	58	150	−92	16	

Rules for classification: 1) Points; 2) Goal difference; 3) Number of goals scored.
(Q) Qualified for the phase indicated

Series II

Pos	Team	Pld	W	D	L	GF	GA	GD	Pts	Qualification or relegation
1	Furnirul Deta (Q)	42	32	6	4	121	36	+85	70	Qualification to championship final
2	Dacia Timișoara	42	31	6	5	125	40	+85	68	
3	Auto FZB Timișoara	42	27	5	10	114	47	+67	59	
4	Partizan Diniaș	42	23	6	13	79	53	+26	52	
5	Steaua Roșie Bulgăruș	42	22	6	14	80	64	+16	50	
6	Avântul Periam	42	19	10	13	70	59	+11	48	
7	Progresul Ciacova	42	20	6	16	92	58	+34	46	
8	Voința Jebel	42	19	8	15	86	72	+14	46	
9	Steaua Roșie Variaș	42	21	3	18	95	65	+30	45	
10	Mureșul Igriș	42	19	4	19	66	81	−15	42	
11	Unirea Peciu Nou	42	18	5	19	60	71	−11	41	
12	Voința Șandra	42	18	4	20	98	92	+6	40	
13	Textila Timișoara	42	14	10	18	59	77	−18	38	
14	Unirea Banloc	42	17	4	21	57	76	−19	38	
15	Dacia Cărpiniș	42	14	6	22	81	115	−34	34	
16	Voința Sânnicolau Mare	42	13	7	22	75	101	−26	33	
17	Progresul Iecea Mare	42	14	5	23	61	100	−39	33	
18	Banatul Teremia Mare	42	15	2	25	78	91	−13	32	
19	Progresul Comloșu Mare	42	12	6	24	61	100	−39	30	
20	Unirea Jimbolia	42	13	4	25	56	106	−50	30	
21	Tehnolemn Timișoara	42	12	4	26	77	106	−29	28	
22	Pobeda Dudeștii Vechi	42	10	1	31	49	121	−72	21	

Rules for classification: 1) Points; 2) Goal difference; 3) Number of goals scored.
(Q) Qualified for the phase indicated

Championship final

The matches was played on 7 and 14 June 1990.

Team 1	Agg.	Team 2	1st leg	2nd leg
Electromotor Timișoara	3–1	Furnirul Deta	3–0	0–1

Electromotor Timișoara won the Timiș County Championship and qualify to promotion play-off in Divizia C.

== See also ==
- 1989–90 Divizia A
- 1989–90 Divizia B
- 1989–90 Divizia C
- 1989–90 Cupa României
