= AS Viitorul Vaslui =

Romanian football club

Viitorul Vaslui
- Full name: Asociația Sportivă Viitorul Vaslui
- Nickname(s): Vasluienii (The People from Vaslui)
- Short name: Viitorul
- Founded: 1976 as Inter Moara Grecilor
- Dissolved: 1990
- Ground: Stadionul Municipal (Vaslui)
- Capacity: 9,240

Asociația Sportivă Viitorul Vaslui, commonly known as Viitorul Vaslui, was a Romanian football club based in Vaslui, Vaslui County founded in 1976 and dissolved in 1990. Their main rival it was Mecanica Vaslui, a club who which was founded as Viitorul but who dropped this name in 1983.

== History ==
The club was founded in 1976, in the commune of Moara Grecilor, near to Vaslui, under the name of Inter Moara Grecilor and played at the county level until 1983. Renamed as Inter Vaslui, the club promoted to Divizia C winning Vaslui County Championship at the end of the 1982–83 season. The team included players such as Ion Anton, Costel Măgureanu, Neculai Genovel, Sorin Manea, Dan Băbăscu, Constantin Gavriluță among others.

Inter finished in an honorable eighth place in the first season in third division, followed by fifth place in the 1984–85 season. The second place from 1985–86 season predicted the promotion from next season. With former Rapid București player Constantin Dinu as new head coach, Inter won the series II of Divizia C promoting for the first time in the second division.

In Divizia B, Inter lasted only one season, finishing in 15th place tied on points with CS Botoșani and FEPA 74 Bârlad it was relegated at goal difference. However, the next season, the club was renamed as Viitorul Vaslui, and promoted back to second division winning the Series II of Divizia C. Viitorul relegated again after was finished in last place in Series I of Divizia B at the end of 1989–90 season.

The club was disbanded in the summer of 1990 due to the lack of funds.

== Honours ==
Liga III

- Winners (2): 1986–87, 1988–89
- Runners-up (1): 1985–86

Liga IV – Vaslui County

- Winners (1): 1982–83

== League history ==
Season	Tier	Division	Place	Notes	Cupa României
1989–90	2	Divizia B (Seria I)	18th	Relegated	
1988–89	3	Divizia C (Seria II)	1st (C)	Promoted	
1987–88	2	Divizia B (Seria I)	15th	Relegated	
1986–87	3	Divizia C (Seria II)	1st (C)	Promoted	

Season	Tier	Division	Place	Notes	Cupa României
1985–86	3	Divizia C (Seria II)	2nd		
1984–85	3	Divizia C (Seria II)	5th		
1983–84	3	Divizia C (Seria II)	8th		
1982–83	4	County Championship (VS)	1st (C)	Promoted	
