= CS Medgidia =

Romanian football club

- Full name: Clubul Sportiv Medgidia
- Short name: Medgidia
- Founded: 1952; 74 years ago as Cimentul Medgidia; 2017; 9 years ago as CS Medgidia
- Ground: Iftimie Ilisei
- Capacity: 32,700
- Owner: Medgidia Municipality
- Chairman: Nicolae Tutungiu
- Manager: Gelu Hampu
- League: Liga IV
- 2025–26: Liga V, Constanța, West Series, 1st (promoted)
Home colours	Away colours

Clubul Sportiv Medgidia, commonly known as CS Medgidia, or simply as Medgidia, is a Romanian sports club from Medgidia, Constanța County, Romania, founded in 1952.

Its professional football club currently play in the Liga V. Apart from football the club also competes in handball, volleyball, wrestling, boxing, arm wrestling, swimming, chess, and rugby.

== History ==
CS Medgidia was founded in 1952 as Cimentul Medgidia (Medgidia Cement), name that was in close contact with the club's owner Medgidia Cement Factory. Over time the club was named also as Voința I.C.S. and Cimentul Voința being a team with constant appearances in the second and third tiers. The local rival of Cimentul was I.M.U.M. Medgidia, club named over time also as I.M.U.M. C.S. Școlar and Progresul C.S.Ș.

1999–2000 season of Divizia C was the last one for the club under the name of Cimentul, in the summer of 2000 the club was renamed as CSM Medgidia. In 2002 the club promoted back in Liga II, but after two seasons chose to sell its place to Liberty Salonta and continued to play in the Liga III until 2010, when the club withdrew from championship, then being dissolved.

In the summer of 2017, the team was re-founded as CS Medgidia and was enrolled in the Liga IV, promoting back in the Liga III after only one season.

== Honours ==
Liga III

- Winners (3): 1974–75, 1978–79, 2001–02
- Runners-up (1): 1986–87

Liga IV – Constanța County

- Winners (4): 1991–92, 2006–07, 2017–18, 2023–24
- Runners-up (1): 2021–22

== Players ==
=== First-team squad ===
As of 10 September 2024

Note: Flags indicate national team as defined under FIFA eligibility rules; some limited exceptions apply. Players may hold more than one non-FIFA nationality.

No.	Pos.	Nation	Player
1	GK	ROU	Sebastian Ciuperceanu
2	DF	ROU	Elis Menlomer
3	DF	ROU	Ștefan Fîșca
4	DF	ROU	Adrian Anton
5	DF	ROU	Adrian Iamandi
6	DF	ROU	Dragoș Grigore
7	DF	ROU	Theodor Haas
9	FW	ROU	Dănuț Petrescu
10	MF	ROU	Daniel Dogaru (Captain)
11	MF	ROU	Alexandru Cojocaru
14	MF	ROU	Alin Popescu
15	MF	ROU	Ștefan Teodorof
16	MF	ROU	Alin Silagyi

No.	Pos.	Nation	Player
17	MF	ROU	George Rusu
18	FW	ROU	Edis Amza
19	DF	ROU	Gheorghe Andreescu
20	MF	ROU	Marius Iftimie
21	MF	ROU	Flavius Ghenea
22	DF	ROU	Răzvan Babu
24	MF	ROU	Marius Anton
25	FW	ROU	Mihai Zugravu
26	MF	ROU	Vasile Carabuz
30	FW	ROU	Marian Megulete
32	DF	ROU	Bogdan Trifu
82	GK	ROU	Cristian Nanu

=== Out on loan ===
Note: Flags indicate national team as defined under FIFA eligibility rules; some limited exceptions apply. Players may hold more than one non-FIFA nationality.

No. / Pos. / Nation / Player	No. / Pos. / Nation / Player

== Club Officials ==
=== Board of directors ===
Role	Name
Owner	(Romania) Medgidia Municipality
President	(Romania) Nicolae Tutungiu
Youth Center Manager	(Romania) Aurelian Despa

=== Current technical staff ===
Role	Name
Manager	(Romania) Gelu Hampu
Goalkeeping Coach	(Romania) Valentin Dumitrică
Fitness Coach	(Romania) George Focan

== Former managers ==
- (Romania) Vasile Stancu (1975–1976)

== League history ==
Season	Tier	Division	Place	Cupa României
2024–25	3	Liga III (Seria III)	9th (R)	
2023–24	4	Liga IV (CT)	1st (C, P)	
2019–20	3	Liga III (Seria II)	12th (R)	
2018–19	3	Liga III (Seria II)	10th	
2017–18	4	Liga IV (CT)	1st (C, P)	
2010–11	3	Liga III (Seria II)	16th (R)	
2009–10	3	Liga III (Seria II)	14th	
2008–09	3	Liga III (Seria II)	14th	
2007–08	3	Liga III (Seria II)	9th	
2004–05	3	Divizia C (Seria II)	12th (R)	
2003–04	2	Divizia B (Seria I)	12th (R)	
2002–03	2	Divizia B (Seria I)	12th	

Season	Tier	Division	Place	Cupa României
2001–02	3	Divizia C (Seria III)	1st (C, P)	
2000–01	3	Divizia C (Seria III)	6th	Round of 32
1999–00	3	Divizia C (Seria II)	4th	
1998–99	3	Divizia C (Seria II)	14th	
1997–98	3	Divizia C (Seria II)	12th	
1996–97	3	Divizia C (Seria II)	7th	
1995–96	3	Divizia C (Seria II)	11th	
1994–95	3	Divizia C (Seria II)	12th	
1993–94	3	Divizia C (Seria II)	9th	
1992–93	3	Divizia C (Seria II)	8th	
1990–91	4	Divizia D (CT)	?	Round of 32
1989–90	3	Divizia C (Seria IV)	15th (R)	
