= CSM Lugoj =

Romanian football club

- Full name: Clubul Sportiv Municipal Lugoj
- Nicknames: Vulturii alb albaștrii (The White and Blues); Vulturii (The Eagles)
- Short name: CSM
- Founded: 1920; 106 years ago as Vulturii Lugoj; 2009; 17 years ago as CSM Lugoj
- Ground: Tineretului
- Capacity: 6,000
- Owner: Lugoj Municipality
- Chairman: Adrian Miron
- Manager: Árpád Laczkó
- League: Liga IV
- 2025–26: Liga IV, Timiș County, 12th of 16
- Website: https://csmlugoj.com/fotbal/
| Home colours | Away colours |

Club Sportiv Municipal Lugoj, commonly known as CSM Lugoj, or simply as Lugoj, is a Romanian football club from Lugoj, Timiș County, Romania. The club was named in the past, Vulturii Textila, after a textile company in the city of Lugoj. CSM Lugoj was founded under the name Vulturii Lugoj in 1920. The club is currently playing in Liga III, the third tier of the Romanian football league system.

== History ==
The club was promoted in 1934 to the newly formed Divizia B (The League II). It had previously only played in the regional championship of Banat where it had fared well since its founding.

Through three seasons of constantly improving football in Divizia B, in 1937, the club made history. It convincingly defeated Mureșul Târgu Mureș, and then beat Sportul Studențesc București in the quarter-finals of the prestigious Romanian Cup. Despite this good run, they were eliminated in the semi-finals by the first division club Juventus București. After the great season of 1937, the club rose to the top flight because the Divizia A League had been increased in that same year from 12 to 20 teams. Unfortunately, the club was pushed into relegation and back to a lower division the following year. Divizia A had once again decided to reduce itself to twelve participating clubs.

In the years following, Vulturii was unable to show any kind of progress. They could not replay the amazing football they had once brought to the field in 1937. The club played in Divizia B and placed themselves around the middle of the league standings. Then World War II led to interruption in the league's functioning. After play resumed following the end of the war, the club dropped further and was relegated to the lowest division, Divizia C. This lasted for just one season. The club was relegated once again in the regional leagues.

Vulturii Textila Lugoj played for almost twenty years in the regional leagues of the Timiș County, before the club managed to return to Divizia C in 1968. There, they were able to rise to second place and were then promoted during the year 1970–71, for a one-season into Divizia B, before being dropped again. Over the next 30 years, they constantly oscillated between the Divizia B and Divizia C.

In 2002 the club was dissolved and a new team was founded under the name Auxerre Lugoj. In the summer of 2009, after the dissolution of Auxerre Lugoj, CSM Lugoj, which was founded in 2002 as a multi-sports club, also founded a football section, to replace the defunct Auxerre.

In the 2011–12 season, Lugoj, guided by Cosmin Stan, won the Liga IV – Timiș County and the promotion play-off against Pandurii Cerneți, the winner of Liga IV – Mehedinți County, 3–0 at Mircea Chivu Stadium in Reșița.

In the summer of 2012, CSM Lugoj was renamed as Vulturii Lugoj.

In the summer of 2015, the club changed its name from Vulturii Lugoj back to CSM Lugoj.

== Chronology of names ==
| Name | Period |
|---|---|
| Vulturii Lugoj | 1920–1934 |
| Vulturii Textila Lugoj | 1934–1946 |
| 23 August Lugoj | 1946–1947 |
| CSM Lugoj | 1947–1948 |
| Vulturii Textila Lugoj | 1948–1984 |
| CSM Lugoj | 1984–1989 |
| Vulturii Lugoj | 1989–2002 |
| CSM Lugoj | 2009–2012 |
| Vulturii Lugoj | 2012–2015 |
| CSM Lugoj | 2015–present |

- Note: 7 years of inactivity between 2002 and 2009, and the team was refounded as CSM Lugoj in the Liga V.

== Divizia A history ==
| Season | Played | W | D | L | Goals | +/- | Points |
|---|---|---|---|---|---|---|---|
| 1937–38 | 18 | 6 | 2 | 10 | 24:41 | −17 | 14 |

== Honours ==
=== Leagues ===
Liga III

- Winners (2): 1970–71, 1989–90
- Runners-up (4): 1969–70, 1972–73, 1985–86, 1988–89

Liga IV – Timiș County

- Winners (1): 2011–12
- Runners-up (3): 2021–22, 2022–23, 2023–24

=== Cups ===
Cupa României – Regional Phase (West)

- Winners (1): 2022–23

== Club Officials ==
=== Board of directors ===
| Role | Name |
|---|---|
| Owner | (Romania) Lugoj Municipality |
| President | (Romania) Adrian Miron |
| Sporting director | (Romania) Octavian Benga |
| Team manager | (Romania) Călin Rosenblum |

=== Current technical staff ===
| Role | Name |
|---|---|
| Manager | (Romania) Árpád Laczkó |
| Assistant coaches | (Romania) Petru Ploscariu (Romania) Dafin Danciu |
| Goalkeeping coach | (Romania) Gabriel Bota |

== League history ==
| Season | Tier | Division | Place | Notes | Cupa României |
|---|---|---|---|---|---|
| 2024–25 | 4 | Liga IV (TM) | 1st (C) | | |

| Season | Tier | Division | Place | Notes | Cupa României |

== Former managers ==
- (Romania) Vilmos Zombori (1949–1951)
