= 1963–64 Divizia B =

Divizia B
- Season: 1963–64
- Country: Romania
- Teams: 28 (2x14)
- Promoted: Știința Craiova; Minerul Baia Mare
- Relegated: Ceahlăul Piatra Neamț; Arieșul Turda; Foresta Fălticeni; Flamura Roșie Oradea

The 1963–64 Divizia B was the 24th season of the second tier of the Romanian football league system.

The format has been changed to two series, each of them having 14 teams. At the end of the season the winners of the series promoted to Divizia A and the last two places from each series relegated to Divizia C.

== Team changes ==
=== To Divizia B ===
Promoted from Regional Championship

- —

Relegated from Divizia A

- Dinamo Bacău
- Minerul Lupeni

=== From Divizia B ===
Relegated to Divizia C

- Dinamo Obor București
- Recolta Carei
- Progresul Alexandria
- Vagonul Arad
- Rapid Focșani
- CFR Roșiori
- Steaua Dej
- Flamura Roșie Tecuci
- Metalul Turnu Severin
- CFR-IRTA Arad

Promoted to Divizia A

- Siderurgistul Galați
- Dinamo Pitești
- ASA Crișul Oradea

=== Excluded teams ===
Crișana Oradea relegated at the end of the 1962–63 Divizia A season, but was dissolved during the summer break and excluded from the new season of Divizia B.

=== Other relegated teams ===
Carpați Sinaia, Prahova Ploiești, Progresul Brăila and IMU Medgidia were relegated directly to Local Championship due to a match fixing scandal and also for repeated violence events recorded on their stadiums.

== League tables ==
=== Serie I ===
Pos	Team	Pld	W	D	L	GF	GA	GD	Pts	Promotion or relegation
1	Știința Craiova (C, P)	26	12	8	6	45	27	+18	32	Promotion to Divizia A
2	Metalul Târgoviște	26	15	2	9	44	39	+5	32	
3	Poiana Câmpina	26	14	3	9	40	29	+11	31	
4	Dinamo Bacău	26	12	5	9	51	26	+25	29	
5	Metalul București	26	11	4	11	26	27	−1	26	
6	CFR Pașcani	26	9	8	9	31	33	−2	26	
7	Tractorul Brașov	26	10	5	11	35	27	+8	25	
8	Știința București	26	10	5	11	37	37	0	25	
9	Flacăra Moreni	26	12	1	13	35	37	−2	25	
10	Unirea Râmnicu Vâlcea	26	10	5	11	37	48	−11	25	
11	Chimia Făgăraș	26	10	4	12	37	42	−5	24	
12	Știința Galați	26	9	5	12	40	35	+5	23	
13	Ceahlăul Piatra Neamț (R)	26	8	7	11	43	49	−6	23	Relegation to Divizia C
14	Foresta Fălticeni (R)	26	6	6	14	24	69	−45	18	Relegation to Divizia C

Source: romaniansoccer.ro
Rules for classification: 1) Points 2) Head-to-head points; 3) Head-to-head goal difference; 4) Head-to-head goals scored; 5) Head-to-head away goals scored; 6) Goal difference; 7) Goals scored.
(C) Champions; (P) Promoted; (R) Relegated

=== Serie II ===
Pos	Team	Pld	W	D	L	GF	GA	GD	Pts	Promotion or relegation
1	Minerul Baia Mare (C, P)	26	17	2	7	42	20	+22	36	Promotion to Divizia A
2	CSM Reșița	26	14	4	8	40	24	+16	32	
3	CFR Timișoara	26	11	9	6	31	27	+4	31	
4	Jiul Petrila	26	9	8	9	30	35	−5	26	
5	Cugir	26	9	8	9	19	37	−18	26	
6	Gaz Metan Mediaș	26	10	5	11	32	23	+9	25	
7	Mureșul Târgu Mureș	26	8	9	9	42	38	+4	25	
8	Industria Sârmei Câmpia Turzii	26	11	3	12	44	40	+4	25	
9	ASMD Satu Mare	26	11	3	12	30	37	−7	25	
10	Minerul Lupeni	26	10	5	11	30	38	−8	25	
11	CSM Cluj	26	9	4	13	34	31	+3	22	
12	CSM Sibiu	26	9	4	13	27	26	+1	22	
13	Arieșul Turda (R)	26	8	6	12	30	36	−6	22	Relegation to Divizia C
14	Flamura Roșie Oradea (R)	26	8	6	12	21	40	−19	22	Relegation to Divizia C

Source: romaniansoccer.ro
Rules for classification: 1) Points 2) Head-to-head points; 3) Head-to-head goal difference; 4) Head-to-head goals scored; 5) Head-to-head away goals scored; 6) Goal difference; 7) Goals scored.
(C) Champions; (P) Promoted; (R) Relegated

== See also ==
- 1963–64 Divizia A
- 1963–64 Divizia C
- 1963–64 Regional Championship
- 1963–64 Cupa României
