= 1964–65 Divizia C =

Third tier Romanian football league

Divizia C
- Season: 1964–65
- Champions: Ceahlăul Piatra Neamț Dinamo Victoria București CFR Arad Arieșul Turda
- Promoted: Ceahlăul Piatra Neamț Dinamo Victoria București CFR Arad Arieșul Turda
- Relegated: Textila Botoșani Rulmentul Bârlad Unirea Răcari Progresul Alexandria Teba Arad Metalul Pitești Topitorul Baia Mare Unirea Târgu Mureș

The 1964–65 Divizia C was the 9th season of Liga III, the third tier of the Romanian football league system.

The format has been changed from four series of 12 teams to four series of 14 teams. At the end of the season, the winners of the each series promoted to Divizia B and the last two places from each series relegated to Regional Championship.

== Team changes ==
=== To Divizia C ===
Relegated from Divizia B

- Ceahlăul Piatra Neamț
- Arieșul Turda
- Foresta Fălticeni
- Flamura Roșie Oradea

Promoted from Regional Championship

- Victoria Piatra Neamț
- AS Aiud
- Foresta Sighetu Marmației
- Siretul Rădăuți
- Marina Mangalia
- Minerul Anina
- Minerul Câmpulung
- Rulmentul Brașov

=== From Divizia C ===
Promoted to Divizia B

- CFR Roșiori
- Laminorul Brăila
- Recolta Carei
- Vagonul Arad

Relegated to Regional Championship

- —

=== Renamed teams ===
Dinamo Suceava was renamed as Viitorul Suceava.

Moldova Iași was renamed as Dinamo Moldova Iași.

Unirea Botoșani was renamed as Textila Botoșani.

Siretul Rădăuți was renamed as Metalul Rădăuți.

Siderurgistul Hunedoara was renamed as Metalul Hunedoara.

Metalurgistul Baia Mare was renamed as Topitorul Baia Mare.

Rapid Târgu Mureș was renamed as Unirea Târgu Mureș.

Flamura Roșie Oradea was renamed as Olimpia Oradea.

Chimia Onești was renamed as Chimia Gheorghe Gheorghiu-Dej, as from March 1965 the Onești town was renamed as Gheorghe Gheorghiu-Dej.

== League tables ==
=== East Series ===
Pos	Team	Pld	W	D	L	GF	GA	GD	Pts	Promotion or relegation
1	Ceahlăul Piatra Neamț (C, P)	26	17	2	7	66	27	+39	36	Promotion to Divizia B
2	Textila Buhuși	26	12	8	6	41	27	+14	32	
3	Chimia Gheorghe Gheorghiu-Dej	26	12	6	8	30	27	+3	30	
4	Fructexport Focșani	26	12	5	9	49	29	+20	29	
5	Foresta Fălticeni	26	10	7	9	29	35	−6	27	
6	Flamura Roșie Tecuci	26	9	7	10	37	37	0	25	
7	Dinamo Moldova Iași	26	11	3	12	38	42	−4	25	
8	Metalosport Galați	26	11	3	12	30	35	−5	25	
9	Viitorul Suceava	26	10	5	11	28	34	−6	25	
10	Victoria Piatra Neamț	26	8	8	10	29	38	−9	24	
11	Petrolul Moinești	26	9	5	12	27	28	−1	23	
12	Metalul Rădăuți	26	8	6	12	31	48	−17	22	
13	Textila Botoșani (R)	26	9	3	14	27	43	−16	21	Relegation to Regional Championship
14	Rulmentul Bârlad (R)	26	7	6	13	35	45	−10	20	Relegation to Regional Championship

Source: romaniansoccer.ro
(C) Champions; (P) Promoted; (R) Relegated

=== South Series ===
Pos	Team	Pld	W	D	L	GF	GA	GD	Pts	Promotion or relegation
1	Dinamo Victoria București (C, P)	26	12	9	5	46	23	+23	33	Promotion to Divizia B
2	Portul Constanța	26	11	9	6	46	38	+8	31	
3	Victoria Giurgiu	26	10	9	7	39	30	+9	29	
4	Marina Mangalia	26	10	8	8	38	21	+17	28	
5	Rulmentul Brașov	26	11	6	9	40	37	+3	28	
6	Electrica Constanța	26	10	8	8	42	40	+2	28	
7	Textila Sfântu Gheorghe	26	10	7	9	27	21	+6	27	
8	Metrom Brașov	26	9	8	9	32	25	+7	26	
9	Electrica Fieni	26	12	2	12	37	29	+8	26	
10	Rapid Mizil	26	9	8	9	34	36	−2	26	
11	Flacăra Roșie București	26	8	7	11	30	36	−6	23	
12	Tehnometal București	26	7	9	10	23	35	−12	23	
13	Unirea Răcari (R)	26	9	4	13	30	46	−16	22	Relegation to Regional Championship
14	Progresul Alexandria (R)	26	6	2	18	18	65	−47	14	Relegation to Regional Championship

Source: romaniansoccer.ro
(C) Champions; (P) Promoted; (R) Relegated

=== West Series ===
Pos	Team	Pld	W	D	L	GF	GA	GD	Pts	Promotion or relegation
1	CFR Arad (C, P)	26	15	1	10	49	24	+25	31	Promotion to Divizia B
2	Minerul Deva	26	14	3	9	35	28	+7	31	
3	Metalul Hunedoara	26	13	5	8	28	26	+2	31	
4	Metalul Drobeta-Turnu Severin	26	12	4	10	42	30	+12	28	
5	Victoria Călan	26	13	2	11	36	37	−1	28	
6	Electroputere Craiova	26	10	6	10	42	37	+5	26	
7	Minerul Anina	26	12	2	12	35	34	+1	26	
8	Electromotor Timișoara	26	11	4	11	37	39	−2	26	
9	Muscelul Câmpulung	26	11	3	12	25	38	−13	25	
10	Pandurii Târgu Jiu	26	10	4	12	34	37	−3	24	
11	Tractorul Corabia	26	10	4	12	36	43	−7	24	
12	Minerul Câmpulung	26	11	2	13	34	46	−12	24	
13	Teba Arad (R)	26	8	5	13	40	41	−1	21	Relegation to Regional Championship
14	Metalul Pitești (R)	26	9	1	16	35	48	−13	19	Relegation to Regional Championship

Source: romaniansoccer.ro
(C) Champions; (P) Promoted; (R) Relegated

=== North Series ===
Pos	Team	Pld	W	D	L	GF	GA	GD	Pts	Promotion or relegation
1	Arieșul Turda (C, P)	26	15	5	6	63	23	+40	35	Promotion to Divizia B
2	Gloria Bistrița	26	14	2	10	30	34	−4	30	
3	Chimica Târnăveni	26	12	5	9	39	29	+10	29	
4	Faianța Sighisoara	26	11	6	9	38	37	+1	28	
5	AS Aiud	26	11	5	10	51	42	+9	27	
6	Soda Ocna Mureș	28	10	6	12	39	30	+9	26	
7	Minerul Dr. Petru Groza	26	12	2	12	51	42	+9	26	
8	Foresta Sighetu Marmației	26	12	2	12	35	47	−12	26	
9	Unirea Dej	26	12	1	13	37	44	−7	25	
10	Minerul Baia Sprie	26	10	4	12	38	38	0	24	
11	Olimpia Oradea	26	10	4	12	36	42	−6	24	
12	Steaua Roșie Salonta	26	11	2	13	39	47	−8	24	
13	Topitorul Baia Mare (R)	26	8	6	12	44	47	−3	22	Relegation to Regional Championship
14	Unirea Târgu Mureș (R)	26	7	4	15	21	62	−41	18	Relegation to Regional Championship

Source: romaniansoccer.ro
(C) Champions; (P) Promoted; (R) Relegated

== See also ==
- 1964–65 Divizia A
- 1964–65 Divizia B
- 1964–65 Regional Championship
- 1964–65 Cupa României
