= FC Argeș Pitești league record by opponent =

Professional association football club based in Pitești, Romania

Fotbal Club Argeș Pitești is a professional association football club based in Pitești, Romania. The club was founded in 1953.

FC Argeș Pitești played their first top league fixture on 20 August 1961 against Dinamo București. Since that game they have played in 1404 first league matches and have faced 53 different sides. Their most regular opponents have been Dinamo București, whom they have played against on 88 occasions. The club has won 32 of the league matches against Farul Constanța which represents the most Argeș have won against any team. They have drawn more matches with Petrolul Ploiești than with any other club, with 18 of their meetings finishing without a winner. Dinamo București are the side that has defeated Argeș in more league games than any other club, having won 53 of their encounters.

== Key ==
- The table includes results of matches played by Argeș Pitești in Liga I.
- ‡ Clubs with this background and symbol in the "Club" column are defunct
- The name used for each opponent is the name they had when Argeș Pitești most recently played a league match against them. Results against each opponent include results against that club under any former name. For example, results against Universitatea Cluj include matches played against Știința Cluj.
- P = matches played; W = matches won; D = matches drawn; L = matches lost; F = goals for; A = goals against; Win% = percentage of total matches won
- The columns headed "First" and "Last" contain the first and most recent seasons in which Argeș Pitești played league matches against each opponent

== All-time league record ==
Statistics correct as of matches played on season 2016–17.

Opponent	P	W	D	L	F	A	P	W	D	L	F	A	P	W	D	L	F	A	Win%	First	Last	Notes	
Opponent	Home						Away						Total						Win%	First	Last	Notes	
ASA Târgu Mureș ‡	21	20	0	1	49	13		21	6	3	12	20	35		42	26	3	13	69	84	61.90	1967–68	1991–92
Apulum Alba Iulia	2	0	2	0	1	1		2	2	0	0	8	2		4	2	2	0	9	3	50.00	2003–04	2004–05
Astra Ploiești	5	3	1	1	9	5		5	2	0	3	3	5		10	5	1	4	12	14	50.00	1998–99	2002–03
CFR Cluj	11	7	1	3	19	10		11	0	4	7	7	17		22	7	5	10	26	36	31.82	1969–70	2008–09
CFR Timișoara	1	1	0	0	3	1		1	1	0	0	2	0		2	2	0	0	5	3	100.00	1970–71	1970–71
CS Otopeni ‡	1	0	1	0	1	1		1	1	0	0	2	1		2	1	1	0	3	2	50.00	2008–09	2008–09
CSM Reșița	9	5	4	0	13	7		9	2	3	4	7	10		18	7	7	4	20	23	38.89	1972–73	1999–00
CSM Suceava ‡	1	1	0	0	2	1		1	0	0	1	1	2		2	1	0	1	3	4	50.00	1987–88	1987–88
Ceahlăul Piatra Neamț	11	9	2	0	20	8		11	2	1	8	6	18		22	11	3	8	26	38	50.00	1994–95	2006–07
Chimia Râmnicu Vâlcea ‡	10	8	2	0	19	6		10	3	3	4	8	9		20	11	5	4	27	28	55.00	1974–75	1986–87
Chindia Târgoviște ‡	9	8	1	0	15	4		9	1	2	6	7	13		18	9	3	6	22	28	50.00	1961–62	1997–98
Corvinul Hunedoara ‡	15	10	5	0	28	4		15	1	3	11	11	35		30	11	8	11	39	63	36.67	1976–77	1991–92
Dacia Unirea Brăila	2	1	0	1	5	2		2	0	1	1	2	3		4	1	1	2	7	8	25.00	1990–91	1991–92
Dinamo București	44	19	10	15	58	59		44	4	2	38	32	111		88	23	12	53	90	169	26.14	1961–62	2008–09
Dunărea Galați ‡	5	5	0	0	8	2		5	1	0	4	3	6		10	6	0	4	11	14	60.00	1974–75	1983–84
Extensiv Craiova ‡	3	2	1	0	7	1		3	0	1	2	1	4		6	2	2	2	8	11	33.33	1991–92	1998–99
FC Brașov	33	21	7	5	52	22		33	2	7	24	20	57		66	23	14	29	72	109	34.85	1961–62	2008–09
FC Oneşti ‡	2	2	0	0	4	0		2	2	0	0	5	1		4	4	0	0	9	5	100.00	1998–99	1999–00
FC Oradea ‡	18	15	3	0	46	11		18	2	4	12	14	28		36	17	7	12	60	74	47.22	1963–64	2003–04
FC U Craiova	13	7	4	2	17	6		13	3	3	7	11	17		26	10	7	9	28	34	38.46	1994–95	2008–09
FC Vaslui	3	1	2	0	2	1		3	1	0	2	1	4		6	2	2	2	3	6	33.33	2005–06	2008–09
FCM Bacău ‡	36	25	8	3	79	27		36	3	5	28	29	78		72	28	13	31	108	157	38.89	1961–62	2005–06
FCSB	5	0	3	2	4	6		5	0	1	4	0	10		10	0	4	6	4	14	0.00	2003–04	2008–09
Farul Constanța	34	28	4	2	79	23		34	4	6	24	21	60		68	32	10	26	100	139	47.06	1963–64	2008–09
Flacăra Moreni	4	3	1	0	8	3		4	0	1	3	0	4		8	3	2	3	8	12	37.50	1986–87	1989–90
Foresta Suceava ‡	3	1	2	0	4	3		3	1	2	0	6	5		6	2	4	0	10	9	33.33	1997–98	2000–01
Gaz Metan Mediaș	2	2	0	0	4	1		2	0	2	0	4	4		4	2	2	0	8	8	50.00	2000–01	2008–09
Gloria Bistrița	16	13	3	0	35	12		16	0	2	14	12	37		32	13	5	14	47	72	40.63	1990–91	2008–09
Gloria Buzău	6	4	2	0	17	5		6	0	2	4	6	11		12	4	4	4	23	28	33.33	1978–79	2008–09
Inter Sibiu ‡	6	3	2	1	4	2		6	0	1	5	2	14		12	3	3	6	6	18	25.00	1988–89	1995–96
Jiul Petroșani	27	24	0	3	60	14		27	5	5	17	22	50		54	29	5	20	82	110	53.70	1961–62	2005–06
Maramureş Baia Mare	7	7	0	0	20	1		7	2	3	2	6	7		14	9	3	2	26	27	64.29	1964–65	1994–95
Minerul Lupeni ‡	1	1	0	0	3	1		1	0	0	1	0	2		2	1	0	1	3	5	50.00	1961–62	1961–62
Naţional București	23	13	4	6	41	29		23	4	7	12	22	39		46	17	11	18	63	80	36.96	1961–62	2006–07
Olimpia Satu Mare	6	5	1	0	16	5		6	1	0	5	4	9		12	6	1	5	20	25	50.00	1974–75	1998–99
Olt Scornicești	11	7	3	1	25	5		11	3	0	8	6	12		22	10	3	9	31	37	45.45	1979–80	1989–90
Oțelul Galați	18	10	7	1	29	16	18	4	4	10	15	30	36	14	11	11	44	59	38.89	1986–87	2008–09		
Pandurii Târgu Jiu	3	1	1	1	2	2	3	0	0	3	2	6	6	1	1	4	4	8	16.67	2005–06	2008–09		
Petrolul Ploiești	30	17	10	3	49	26	30	6	8	16	27	50	60	23	18	19	76	99	38.33	1961–62	2003–04		
Politehnica Iași ‡	24	22	1	1	73	17	24	6	2	16	19	45	48	28	3	17	92	118	58.33	1963–64	2008–09		
Politehnica Timișoara	28	19	7	2	53	16	28	4	3	21	21	54	56	23	10	23	74	107	41.07	1961–62	2008–09		
Rapid București ‡	36	17	8	11	40	34	36	7	7	22	24	46	72	24	15	33	64	86	33.33	1961–62	2008–09		
Rocar București ‡	2	2	0	0	4	1	2	1	0	1	3	1	4	3	0	1	7	5	75.00	1999–00	2000–01		
Siderurgistul Galați ‡	2	2	0	0	5	2	2	0	2	0	1	1	4	2	2	0	6	6	50.00	1963–64	1965–66		
Sportul Studenţesc București	28	17	7	4	50	24	28	4	10	14	27	42	56	21	17	18	77	92	37.50	1972–73	2005–06		
Steaua București	39	16	8	15	47	44	39	7	6	26	35	82	78	23	14	41	82	129	29.49	1961–62	2002–03		
UM Timișoara ‡	1	1	0	0	4	1	1	0	1	0	1	1	2	1	1	0	5	5	50.00	2001–02	2001–02		
UTA Arad	21	18	1	2	45	14	21	0	7	14	13	43	42	18	8	16	58	88	42.86	1961–62	2006–07		
Unirea Urziceni ‡	2	0	2	0	1	1	2	0	1	1	2	3	4	0	3	1	3	4	0.00	2006–07	2008–09		
Universitatea Cluj	28	17	4	7	47	24	28	9	5	14	32	48	56	26	9	21	79	95	46.43	1961–62	1998–99		
Universitatea Craiova	28	18	4	6	46	24	28	1	4	23	19	61	56	19	8	29	65	107	33.93	1964–65	1991–92		
Vagonul Arad ‡	1	1	0	0	4	0	1	0	0	1	1	3	2	1	0	1	5	7	50.00	1968–69	1968–69		
Victoria București ‡	5	2	1	2	6	5	5	2	2	1	11	8	10	4	3	3	17	14	40.00	1985–86	1989–90		
