= 1961–62 Divizia B =

Divizia B
- Season: 1961–62
- Promoted: CSMS Iași; Farul Constanța; Crișana Oradea
- Relegated: Dinamo Suceava; Olimpia București; Rapid Târgu Mureș; Steaua Roșie Bacău; Portul Constanța; Corvinul Hunedoara

The 1961–62 Divizia B was the 22nd season of the second tier of the Romanian football league system.

The format has been maintained to three series, each of them having 14 teams. At the end of the season the winners of the series promote to Divizia A and the last two places from each series relegate to Regional Championship.

== Team changes ==
=== To Divizia B ===
Promoted from Regional Championship

- Crișul Oradea
- Carpați Sinaia
- Ceahlăul Piatra Neamț
- CFR Arad
- Rapid IRA Târgu Mureș
- Știința Galați

Relegated from Divizia A

- CSMS Iași
- Farul Constanța
- Corvinul Hunedoara

=== From Divizia B ===
Relegated to Regional Championship

- Unirea Iași
- CFR Electroputere Craiova
- Gloria Bistrița
- Rulmentul Bârlad
- Drobeta Turnu-Severin
- Dinamo Barza

Promoted to Divizia A

- Metalul Târgoviște
- Dinamo Pitești
- Jiul Petroșani

=== Renamed teams ===
Academia Militară București was renamed as Olimpia București.

AMEF Arad was renamed as Vagonul Arad.

CFR Timișoara was renamed as CSO Timișoara.

CSM Brăila was renamed as CSO Brăila.

SNM Constanța was renamed as Portul Constanța.

Dinamo Săsar was moved to Satu Mare, merged with Voința Satu Mare and renamed as ASMD Satu Mare.

== League tables ==
=== Serie I ===
Pos	Team	Pld	W	D	L	GF	GA	GD	Pts	Promotion or relegation
1	CSMS Iași (C, P)	26	16	6	4	67	23	+44	38	Promotion to Divizia A
2	Poiana Câmpina	26	16	2	8	55	28	+27	34	
3	Prahova Ploiești	26	9	12	5	39	32	+7	30	
4	Carpați Sinaia	26	13	4	9	57	50	+7	30	
5	Foresta Fălticeni	26	11	5	10	30	37	−7	27	
6	Dinamo Galați	26	10	6	10	44	47	−3	26	
7	Brăila	26	8	10	8	29	34	−5	26	
8	Ceahlăul Piatra Neamț	26	10	6	10	31	40	−9	26	
9	Știința Galați	26	11	3	12	35	39	−4	25	
10	Rapid Focșani	26	8	7	11	35	45	−10	23	
11	Flacăra Moreni	26	7	7	12	34	42	−8	21	
12	CFR Pașcani	26	9	3	14	34	45	−11	21	
13	Dinamo Suceava (R)	26	8	3	15	34	40	−6	19	Regional Championship
14	Steaua Roșie Bacău (R)	26	5	8	13	23	45	−22	18	Regional Championship

Source: romaniansoccer.ro
Rules for classification: 1) Points 2) Head-to-head points; 3) Head-to-head goal difference; 4) Head-to-head goals scored; 5) Head-to-head away goals scored; 6) Goal difference; 7) Goals scored.
(C) Champions; (P) Promoted; (R) Relegated

=== Serie II ===
Pos	Team	Pld	W	D	L	GF	GA	GD	Pts	Promotion or relegation
1	Farul Constanța (C, P)	26	16	3	7	60	26	+34	35	Promotion to Divizia A
2	CSM Reșița	26	15	2	9	52	41	+11	32	
3	Dinamo Obor București	26	14	4	8	48	39	+9	32	
4	Știința Craiova	26	11	7	8	40	26	+14	29	
5	CFR Roșiori	26	12	3	11	41	43	−2	27	
6	Metalul București	26	10	5	11	34	44	−10	25	
7	CSM Sibiu	26	10	5	11	32	43	−11	25	
8	Chimia Făgăraș	26	10	4	12	47	49	−2	24	
9	Chimia Govora	26	8	8	10	27	32	−5	24	
10	Mediaș	26	8	8	10	24	29	−5	24	
11	Tractorul Brașov	26	8	7	11	37	40	−3	23	
12	Știința București	26	9	4	13	38	47	−9	22	
13	Olimpia București (R)	26	8	6	12	35	44	−9	22	Regional Championship
14	Portul Constanța (R)	26	7	6	13	32	44	−12	20	Regional Championship

Source: romaniansoccer.ro
Rules for classification: 1) Points 2) Head-to-head points; 3) Head-to-head goal difference; 4) Head-to-head goals scored; 5) Head-to-head away goals scored; 6) Goal difference; 7) Goals scored.
(C) Champions; (P) Promoted; (R) Relegated

=== Serie III ===
Pos	Team	Pld	W	D	L	GF	GA	GD	Pts	Promotion or relegation
1	Crișana Oradea (C, P)	26	17	3	6	45	24	+21	37	Promotion to Divizia A
2	Industria Sârmei Câmpia Turzii	26	14	6	6	58	27	+31	34	
3	Mureșul Târgu Mureș	26	13	6	7	49	35	+14	32	
4	CSO Timișoara	26	13	5	8	37	32	+5	31	
5	Vagonul Arad	26	13	4	9	43	29	+14	30	
6	Baia Mare	26	13	3	10	39	41	−2	29	
7	CSM Cluj	26	10	8	8	32	31	+1	28	
8	Arieșul Turda	26	9	9	8	39	34	+5	27	
9	Recolta Carei	26	8	10	8	33	40	−7	26	
10	CFR Arad	26	6	8	12	31	36	−5	20	
11	Crișul Oradea	26	6	7	13	31	49	−18	19	
12	ASMD Satu Mare	26	7	5	14	20	35	−15	19	
13	Rapid IRA Târgu Mureș (R)	26	6	6	14	23	42	−19	18	Regional Championship
14	Corvinul Hunedoara (R)	26	4	6	16	18	43	−25	14	Regional Championship

Source: romaniansoccer.ro
Rules for classification: 1) Points 2) Head-to-head points; 3) Head-to-head goal difference; 4) Head-to-head goals scored; 5) Head-to-head away goals scored; 6) Goal difference; 7) Goals scored.
(C) Champions; (P) Promoted; (R) Relegated

== See also ==
- 1961–62 Divizia A
- 1961–62 Regional Championship
- 1961–62 Cupa României
