= 1964–65 Divizia B =

Divizia B
- Season: 1964–65
- Country: Romania
- Teams: 28 (2x14)
- Promoted: Siderurgistul Galați; Știința Timișoara
- Relegated: Tractorul Brașov; Sătmăreana Satu Mare; Chimia Făgăraș; CFR Timișoara

The 1964–65 Divizia B was the 25th season of the second tier of the Romanian football league system.

The format has been maintained to two series, each of them having 14 teams. At the end of the season the winners of the series promoted to Divizia A and the last two places from each series relegated to Divizia C.

== Team changes ==
=== To Divizia B ===
Promoted from Divizia C

- CFR Roșiori
- Laminorul Brăila
- Recolta Carei
- Vagonul Arad

Relegated from Divizia A

- Știința Timișoara
- Siderurgistul Galați

=== From Divizia B ===
Relegated to Divizia C

- Ceahlăul Piatra Neamț
- Arieșul Turda
- Foresta Fălticeni
- Flamura Roșie Oradea

Promoted to Divizia A

- Știința Craiova
- Minerul Baia Mare

=== Renamed teams ===
ASMD Satu Mare was renamed as Sătmăreana Satu Mare.

CSM Cluj was renamed as Clujeana Cluj.

Laminorul Brăila was renamed as Constructorul Brăila.

=== Other teams ===
Constructorul Brăila (at that time Progresul Brăila) was relegated to the Local Championship (equivalent of Liga IV or Divizia D) at the end of the 1962–63 Divizia B season due to match fixing. After relegation, a new entity, Laminorul Brăila was enrolled in the re-established Divizia C, the new entity also merging with the old one thus becoming its successor. In this way it was possible that after a single season of absence the team would re-appear in the Divizia B, this time under the name of Constructorul Brăila.

Mureșul Târgu Mureș and ASA Târgu Mureș merged, the first one being absorbed by the second one. The new entity was named as ASA Mureșul Târgu Mureș.

== League tables ==
=== Serie I ===
Pos	Team	Pld	W	D	L	GF	GA	GD	Pts	Promotion or relegation
1	Siderurgistul Galați (C, P)	26	14	7	5	38	18	+20	35	Promotion to Divizia A
2	Dinamo Bacău	26	16	3	7	52	25	+27	35	
3	Flacăra Moreni	26	12	5	9	35	32	+3	29	
4	Poiana Câmpina	26	13	2	11	46	39	+7	28	
5	Știința Galați	26	11	5	10	42	42	0	27	
6	Constructorul Brăila	26	12	3	11	41	42	−1	27	
7	Metalul București	26	11	2	13	38	38	0	24	
8	CFR Roșiori	26	8	8	10	29	38	−9	24	
9	CFR Pașcani	26	11	2	13	33	44	−11	24	
10	Metalul Târgoviște	26	10	3	13	28	34	−6	23	
11	Unirea Râmnicu Vâlcea	26	10	2	14	32	36	−4	22	
12	Știința București	26	9	4	13	29	34	−5	22	
13	Tractorul Brașov (R)	26	8	6	12	30	37	−7	22	Relegation to Divizia C
14	Chimia Făgăraș (R)	26	9	4	13	34	48	−14	22	Relegation to Divizia C

Source: romaniansoccer.ro
Rules for classification: 1) Points 2) Head-to-head points; 3) Head-to-head goal difference; 4) Head-to-head goals scored; 5) Head-to-head away goals scored; 6) Goal difference; 7) Goals scored.
(C) Champions; (P) Promoted; (R) Relegated

=== Serie II ===
Pos	Team	Pld	W	D	L	GF	GA	GD	Pts	Promotion or relegation
1	Știința Timișoara (C, P)	26	14	5	7	41	25	+16	33	Promotion to Divizia A
2	IS Câmpia Turzii	26	14	4	8	36	29	+7	32	
3	Clujeana Cluj	26	11	5	10	34	22	+12	27	
4	Minerul Lupeni	26	10	7	9	36	28	+8	27	
5	CSM Sibiu	26	12	3	11	41	37	+4	27	
6	Vagonul Arad	26	11	5	10	33	30	+3	27	
7	Jiul Petrila	26	11	4	11	42	33	+9	26	
8	Cugir	26	12	2	12	36	36	0	26	
9	ASA Mureșul Târgu Mureș	26	13	0	13	40	44	−4	26	
10	Gaz Metan Mediaș	26	9	7	10	24	27	−3	25	
11	CSM Reșița	26	11	3	12	35	40	−5	25	
12	Recolta Carei	26	10	5	11	29	36	−7	25	
13	Sătmăreana Satu Mare (R)	26	10	2	14	30	40	−10	22	Relegation to Divizia C
14	CFR Timișoara (R)	26	6	4	16	20	50	−30	16	Relegation to Divizia C

Source: romaniansoccer.ro
Rules for classification: 1) Points 2) Head-to-head points; 3) Head-to-head goal difference; 4) Head-to-head goals scored; 5) Head-to-head away goals scored; 6) Goal difference; 7) Goals scored.
(C) Champions; (P) Promoted; (R) Relegated

== See also ==
- 1964–65 Divizia A
- 1964–65 Divizia C
- 1964–65 Regional Championship
- 1964–65 Cupa României
