= 1963–64 Regional Championship =

22nd season of the Liga IV, the fourth tier of the Romanian football league

Liga IV
- Season: 1963–64

The 1963–64 Regional Championship was the 22nd season of the Liga IV, the fourth tier of the Romanian football league system. The champions of Regional Championships play against each other in the playoffs to earn promotion to Divizia C.

== Regional championships ==
- Argeș (AG)
- Bacău (BC)
- Banat (BA)
- Brașov (BV)
- Bucharest Municipality (B)
- Bucharest Region (B)
- Cluj (CJ)
- Crișana (CR)
- Dobrogea (DO)
- Galați (GL)
- Hunedoara (HD)
- Iași (IS)
- Maramureș (MM)
- Mureș (MS)
- Oltenia (OL)
- Ploiești (PL)
- Suceava (SV)

== Promotion play-off ==
Preliminary round

The matches were played on 28 June and 5 July 1964.

Team 1	Series	Team 2	Game 1	Game 2	Game 3
Metalul Floreasca (B)	–	(B) Chimia Turnu Măgurele	1–2	–	

Play-off round

The matches were played on 12, 19, 21 and 23 July 1964.

Team 1	Series	Team 2	Game 1	Game 2	Game 3
Constructorul Iași (IS)	2–3	(SV) Siretul Rădăuți	2–0	0–2	0–1
Victoria Piatra Neamț (BC)	7–4	(GL) Constructorul Brăila	5–2	2–2	
Marina Mangalia (DO)	6–5	(B) Chimia Turnu Măgurele	2–2	2–2	2–1 (Note: The match was played on neutral ground at Dinamo Stadium in București.)
Metalul 7 Noiembrie Craiova (OT)	5–6	(AG) Minerul Câmpulung	3–3	1–1	1–2
Minerul Aninoasa (HD)	2–3	(BA) Minerul Anina	1–0	1–2	0–1 (Note: The match was played on neutral ground at Drobeta Turnu-Severin.)
Rulmentul Brașov (BV)	4–4 (Note: Promoted Rulmentul Brașov by drawing lots.)	(PL) Rapid Plopeni	1–2	1–0	2–2(a.e.t.) (Note: The match was played on neutral ground at Dinamo Stadium in București.)
ASM Odorheiu Secuiesc (MS)	0–2	(CJ) Aiud	0–2	0–0	
Dinamo Oradea (CR)	1–4	(MM) Foresta Sighetu Marmației	1–3	0–1	

== Championships standings ==
=== Argeș Region ===
Pos	Team	Pld	W	D	L	GF	GA	GD	Pts	Qualification or relegation
1	Minerul Câmpulung (C, Q)	26	18	2	6	60	17	+43	38	Qualification to promotion play-off
2	Oltul Drăgănești-Olt	26	15	8	3	47	20	+27	38	
3	Progresul Băiculești	26	13	3	10	41	43	−2	29	
4	Rapid Piatra-Olt	26	13	2	11	34	31	+3	28	
5	Victoria Slatina	26	9	8	9	34	28	+6	26	
6	Oltul Râmnicu Vâlcea	26	11	4	11	42	38	+4	26	
7	ASVP Găești	26	12	2	12	48	45	+3	26	
8	Chimia Govora	26	11	4	11	36	37	−1	26	
9	Recolta Stoicănești	26	10	5	11	42	44	−2	25	
10	Forestierul Stâlpeni	26	8	7	11	32	36	−4	23	
11	ASTR Pitești	26	9	5	12	27	42	−15	23	
12	Unirea Drăgășani	26	10	3	13	34	56	−22	23	
13	Autobuzul Slatina (R)	26	5	7	14	32	51	−19	17	Relegation to Argeș District Championship
14	Constructorul Pitești (R)	26	5	4	17	17	44	−27	14	Relegation to Argeș District Championship

Rules for classification: 1) points; 2) goal difference; 3) number of goals scored.
(C) Champions; (Q) Qualified for the phase indicated; (R) Relegated

=== Bacău Region ===
Pos	Team	Pld	W	D	L	GF	GA	GD	Pts	Qualification or relegation
1	Victoria Piatra Neamț (C, Q)	24	14	4	6	50	20	+30	32	Qualification to promotion play-off
2	Minerul Comănești	24	12	6	6	55	33	+22	30	
3	Oituz Târgu Ocna	24	13	3	8	49	26	+23	29	
4	Petrolistul Dărmănești	24	11	5	8	42	32	+10	27	
5	Metalul Roman	24	11	3	10	41	29	+12	25	
6	Gloria Zemeș	24	11	3	10	54	46	+8	25	
7	Celuloza Piatra Neamț	24	11	3	10	33	43	−10	25	
8	Bradul Roznov	24	7	10	7	27	27	0	24	
9	Victoria Bacău	24	7	7	10	41	42	−1	21	
10	Locomotiva Adjud	24	8	3	13	34	64	−30	19	
11	Cimentul Bicaz	24	7	5	12	32	61	−29	19	
12	Partizanul Bacău	24	7	5	12	19	39	−20	19	
13	Cetatea Târgu Neamț	24	5	7	12	24	39	−15	17	
14	Instalatorul Onești (D)	0	0	0	0	0	0	0	0	Withdrew

Rules for classification: 1) Points; 2) Goal difference; 3) Number of goals scored.
(C) Champions; (D) Disqualified; (Q) Qualified for the phase indicated

=== Banat Region ===
Pos	Team	Pld	W	D	L	GF	GA	GD	Pts	Qualification or relegation
1	Minerul Anina (C, Q)	26	15	5	6	48	20	+28	35	Qualification to promotion play-off
2	Dinamo Timișoara	26	14	5	7	37	29	+8	33	
3	Metalul Bocșa	26	15	1	10	46	31	+15	31	
4	CFR Caransebeș	26	13	3	10	36	29	+7	29	
5	Metalul Oțelul Roșu	25	10	7	8	38	31	+7	27	
6	Șoimii Timișoara	25	7	12	6	28	27	+1	26	
7	Ceramica Jimbolia	26	11	4	11	50	48	+2	26	
8	Oravița	26	8	8	10	36	40	−4	24	
9	Progresul Timișoara	26	8	8	10	37	43	−6	24	
10	ICA Arad	26	11	2	13	33	45	−12	24	
11	Furnirul Deta	26	9	6	11	39	52	−13	24	
12	Progresul CFR Lugoj	26	9	5	12	39	44	−5	23	
13	Olimpia Reșița	26	6	7	13	43	54	−11	19	
14	Stăruința Timișoara	26	7	3	16	20	49	−29	17	

Rules for classification: 1) points; 2) goal difference; 3) number of goals scored.
(C) Champions; (Q) Qualified for the phase indicated

=== Brașov Region ===
Pos	Team	Pld	W	D	L	GF	GA	GD	Pts	Qualification or relegation
1	Rulmentul Brașov (C, Q)	26	15	6	5	60	23	+37	36	Qualification to promotion play-off
2	Progresul Sibiu	26	15	4	7	62	37	+25	34	
3	Colorom Codlea	26	12	4	10	39	34	+5	28	
4	Textila Mediaș	26	11	5	10	45	42	+3	27	
5	Celuloza Zărnești	26	10	7	9	41	50	−9	27	
6	Textila Cisnădie	26	10	5	11	45	42	+3	25	
7	Elastic Sibiu	26	10	5	11	44	44	0	25	
8	Torpedo Zărnești	26	8	9	9	37	40	−3	25	
9	Vitrometan Mediaș	26	7	11	8	32	40	−8	25	
10	Precizia Săcele	26	9	6	11	34	32	+2	24	
11	Chimia Victoria	26	10	4	12	40	50	−10	24	
12	Metalul Copșa Mică	26	7	9	10	25	27	−2	23	
13	Sparta Mediaș	26	7	7	12	31	47	−16	21	
14	Textila Prejmer	26	8	4	14	33	60	−27	20	

Rules for classification: 1) points; 2) goal difference; 3) number of goals scored.
(C) Champions; (Q) Qualified for the phase indicated

=== Bucharest Municipality ===
Championship final

The matches were played on 20 and 24 June 1964.

Team 1	Agg.	Team 2	1st leg	2nd leg
Metalul Floreasca	2–1	Viitorul Electronica București	1–1	1–0

Metalul Floreasca won the Bucharest Municipal Championship and qualify to promotion play-off in Divizia C.

=== Crișana Region ===
The ranking combined the points of the senior and junior teams.

Pos	Team	Pld	W	D	L	GF	GA	GD	Pts	Qualification or relegation
1	Dinamo Oradea (C, Q)	52	34	10	8	124	51	+73	78	Qualification to promotion play-off
2	Unirea Tileagd	52	26	13	13	91	54	+37	65	
3	Steaua Roșie Beiuș	52	26	13	13	122	80	+42	65	
4	Înfrățirea Oradea	51	30	4	17	141	77	+64	64	
5	Minerul Voivozi	52	23	9	20	82	106	−24	55	
6	Unirea Sântana	52	22	9	21	93	90	+3	53	
7	Crișul Ineu	52	23	7	22	76	88	−12	53	
8	Recolta Valea lui Mihai	50	22	8	20	96	82	+14	52	
9	Măgura Șimleu Silvaniei	52	23	6	23	85	94	−9	52	
10	Victoria Chișineu-Criș	52	19	10	23	106	84	+22	48	
11	Victoria Ineu	49	15	11	23	73	104	−31	41	
12	Stăruința Săcuieni	52	17	6	29	73	114	−41	40	
13	Minerul Șuncuiuș	52	12	6	34	49	112	−63	30	
14	Crișana Sebiș	52	10	6	36	50	126	−76	26	

Rules for classification: 1) Points; 2) Goal difference; 3) Number of goals scored.
(C) Champions; (Q) Qualified for the phase indicated

=== Dobrogea Region ===
Pos	Team	Pld	W	D	L	GF	GA	GD	Pts	Qualification or relegation
1	Marina Mangalia (C, Q)	26	17	5	4	62	16	+46	39	Qualification to promotion play-off
2	Stuful Tulcea	26	15	5	6	62	32	+30	35	
3	Cimentul Medgidia	26	15	4	7	49	32	+17	34	
4	Ideal Cernavodă	26	14	5	7	35	26	+9	33	
5	Victoria Saligny	26	13	2	11	42	34	+8	28	
6	Callatis Mangalia	26	11	4	11	48	38	+10	26	
7	Petrolul Constanța	26	8	10	8	39	41	−2	26	
8	USAS Năvodari	26	10	5	11	39	42	−3	25	
9	Recolta Negru Vodă	25	10	4	11	46	44	+2	24	
10	Răsăritul Sulina	26	9	6	11	39	39	0	24	
11	CFR Constanța	26	9	4	13	38	51	−13	22	
12	Dinamo Constanța	26	9	3	14	33	55	−22	21	
13	Tractorul Horia (R)	26	6	6	14	31	64	−33	18	Relegation to Dobrogea District Championship
14	Spartac Constanța (R)	26	3	3	20	17	68	−51	9	Relegation to Dobrogea District Championship

Rules for classification: 1) Points; 2) Goal difference; 3) Number of goals scored.
(C) Champions; (Q) Qualified for the phase indicated; (R) Relegated

=== Galați Region ===
Pos	Team	Pld	W	D	L	GF	GA	GD	Pts	Qualification or relegation
1	Constructorul Brăila (C, Q)	26	21	4	1	74	10	+64	46	Qualification to promotion play-off
2	Ancora Galați	26	18	3	5	59	18	+41	39	
3	Celuloza Brăila	26	15	3	8	56	34	+22	33	
4	Avântul Bujor	26	11	8	7	37	31	+6	30	
5	Dunărea Brăila	26	12	2	12	33	33	0	26	
6	Gloria CFR Galați	26	9	7	10	32	31	+1	25	
7	Tractorul Viziru	26	8	7	11	34	38	−4	23	
8	Mecanizatorul Făurei	26	9	5	12	37	50	−13	23	
9	Victoria Gugești	26	8	6	12	40	46	−6	22	
10	Muncitorul Tecuci	26	9	4	13	55	63	−8	22	
11	Chimica Mărășești	26	8	6	12	25	52	−27	22	
12	Viitorul Rușețu	26	8	5	13	29	48	−19	21	
13	Voința Focșani (R)	26	6	7	13	44	44	0	19	Relegation to Galați District Championship
14	Tractorul Nănești (R)	26	4	3	19	22	80	−58	11	Relegation to Galați District Championship

Rules for classification: 1) points; 2) goal difference; 3) number of goals scored.
(C) Champions; (Q) Qualified for the phase indicated; (R) Relegated

=== Hunedoara Region ===
Pos	Team	Pld	W	D	L	GF	GA	GD	Pts	Qualification or relegation
1	Minerul Aninoasa (C, Q)	26	17	4	5	58	24	+34	38 (Note: The match Minerul Aninoasa–CFR Simeria 0–3, was initially homologated with 0–3 following an appeal, but later returned to the result on the field.)	Qualification to promotion play-off
2	Aurul Brad	26	15	6	5	66	26	+40	36	
3	CFR Simeria	26	13	6	7	41	39	+2	32	
4	Parângul Lonea	26	13	3	10	45	30	+15	29	
5	Constructorul Hunedoara	26	11	6	9	38	34	+4	28	
6	Textila Sebeș	26	12	2	12	57	43	+14	26	
7	Minerul Vulcan	26	12	2	12	60	46	+14	26	
8	Refractara Alba Iulia	26	10	6	10	34	59	−25	26	
9	Jiul Petrila II	25	11	3	11	41	38	+3	25	
10	Știința Petroșani	26	9	6	11	33	48	−15	24	
11	Dacia Orăștie	26	7	7	12	56	55	+1	21	
12	Minerul Ghelari	26	9	3	14	30	49	−19	21	
13	Retezatul Hațeg	25	7	4	14	31	53	−22	18	Spared from relegation
14	Minerul Teliuc (R)	26	4	4	18	21	67	−46	12	Relegation to Hunedoara District Championship

Rules for classification: 1) points; 2) goal difference; 3) number of goals scored.
(C) Champions; (Q) Qualified for the phase indicated; (R) Relegated

=== Maramureș Region ===
Pos	Team	Pld	W	D	L	GF	GA	GD	Pts	Qualification or relegation
1	Forestiera Sighetu Marmației (C, Q)	26	19	3	4	68	30	+38	41	Qualification to promotion play-off
2	Unio Satu Mare	26	18	3	5	63	17	+46	39	
3	Tisa Sighetu Marmației	26	17	2	7	57	25	+32	36	
4	Bradul Vișeu	26	16	3	7	60	37	+23	35	
5	Metalul Satu Mare	26	11	4	11	48	37	+11	26	
6	Recolta Tășnad	26	10	5	11	38	48	−10	25	
7	Someșul Satu Mare	26	12	1	13	46	61	−15	25	
8	Constructorul Baia Mare	26	10	4	12	35	31	+4	24	
9	Minerul Băiuț	26	8	8	10	43	49	−6	24	
10	Minerul Baia Borșa	26	9	5	12	24	37	−13	23	
11	Minerul Cavnic	26	8	6	12	41	45	−4	22	
12	Industria Locală Baia Mare	26	9	2	15	31	48	−17	20	
13	Rapid Satu Mare	26	6	3	17	23	68	−45	15	
14	Recolta Urziceni	26	4	1	21	15	59	−44	9	

Rules for classification: 1) points; 2) goal difference; 3) number of goals scored.
(C) Champions; (Q) Qualified for the phase indicated

=== Mureș Region ===
Pos	Team	Pld	W	D	L	GF	GA	GD	Pts	Qualification or relegation
1	ASM Odorheiu Secuiesc (C, Q)	26	16	8	2	50	20	+30	40	Qualification to promotion play-off
2	Progresul Reghin	26	17	5	4	63	18	+45	39	
3	Știința Târgu Mureș	26	12	7	7	29	24	+5	31	
4	Voința Târgu Mureș	26	12	5	9	47	32	+15	29	
5	Lemnarul Târgu Mureș	26	13	2	11	40	26	+14	28	
6	Străduința Cristuru Secuiesc	26	11	5	10	48	39	+9	27	
7	Ciocanul Târgu Mureș	26	10	7	9	31	39	−8	27	
8	Voința Târnăveni	26	9	7	10	42	47	−5	25	
9	Energia Fântânele	26	11	2	13	44	44	0	24	
10	Mureșul Toplița	26	10	4	12	37	37	0	24	
11	Oțelul Târgu Mureș	26	10	3	13	42	45	−3	23	
12	Gloria Târgu Mureș	26	7	7	12	28	48	−20	21	
13	Viitorul Gheorgheni	26	6	4	16	29	48	−19	16	
14	Recolta Sărmaș	26	2	6	18	21	84	−63	10	

Rules for classification: 1) points; 2) goal difference; 3) number of goals scored.
(C) Champions; (Q) Qualified for the phase indicated

=== Oltenia Region ===
Pos	Team	Pld	W	D	L	GF	GA	GD	Pts	Qualification or relegation
1	Metalul 7 Noiembrie Craiova (C, Q)	26	19	2	5	39	21	+18	40	Qualification to promotion play-off
2	Răsăritul Caracal	26	16	6	4	62	32	+30	38	
3	Progresul Strehaia	26	17	3	6	77	23	+54	37	
4	Metalurgistul Sadu	26	12	5	9	45	40	+5	29	
5	Progresul Balș	26	11	5	10	36	33	+3	27	
6	Gloria Băilești	26	12	1	13	55	45	+10	25	
7	Autorapid Craiova	26	11	2	13	47	53	−6	24	
8	Tractorul Segarcea	26	10	3	13	31	45	−14	23	
9	Sănătatea Târgu Jiu	26	10	2	14	49	45	+4	22	
10	Unirea Caracal	26	10	2	14	42	67	−25	22	
11	Dunărea Calafat	26	8	6	12	31	47	−16	22	
12	Recolta Urzicuța	26	8	4	14	36	51	−15	20	
13	Drubeta Turnu Severin	26	8	2	16	39	48	−9	18	
14	Steagul Roșu Plenița	26	7	3	16	35	74	−39	17	

Rules for classification: 1) points; 2) goal difference; 3) number of goals scored.
(C) Champions; (Q) Qualified for the phase indicated

=== Ploiești Region ===
Pos	Team	Pld	W	D	L	GF	GA	GD	Pts	Qualification or relegation
1	Rapid Plopeni (C, Q)	26	13	8	5	48	24	+24	34	Qualification to promotion play-off
2	Victoria Moreni	26	14	5	7	47	33	+14	33	
3	Caraimanul Bușteni	26	13	5	8	39	30	+9	31	
4	Victoria Florești	26	11	7	8	31	24	+7	29	
5	Metalul Buzău	26	13	2	11	41	28	+13	28	
6	Energia Pucioasa	26	11	6	9	35	34	+1	28	
7	Muncitorul Schela Mare	26	10	4	12	42	47	−5	24	
8	Cimentul Fieni	26	10	4	12	32	39	−7	24	
9	Feroemail Ploiești	26	9	6	11	25	36	−11	24	
10	Rafinăria Câmpina	26	8	7	11	42	42	0	23	
11	Rafinăria Teleajen	26	8	7	11	36	40	−4	23	
12	Voința Râmnicu Sărat	26	10	3	13	36	44	−8	23	
13	Chimistul Valea Călugărească (R)	26	8	7	11	32	41	−9	23	Relegation to Ploiești District Championship
14	Avântul Măneciu (R)	26	6	3	17	27	57	−30	15	Relegation to Ploiești District Championship

Rules for classification: 1) points; 2) goal difference; 3) number of goals scored.
(C) Champions; (Q) Qualified for the phase indicated; (R) Relegated

=== Suceava Region ===
Pos	Team	Pld	W	D	L	GF	GA	GD	Pts	Qualification or relegation
1	Metalul Rădăuți (C, Q)	26	18	5	3	108	27	+81	41	Qualification to promotion play-off
2	Filatura Fălticeni	26	20	1	5	88	31	+57	41	
3	Feroviarul Câmpulung Moldovenesc	26	16	6	4	68	21	+47	38	
4	Victoria Dorohoi	26	15	3	8	99	61	+38	33	
5	CFR Suceava	26	12	8	6	56	34	+22	32	
6	Minobrad Vatra Dornei	26	11	4	11	54	47	+7	26	
7	Foresta Moldovița	26	11	4	11	49	51	−2	26	
8	Avântul Frasin	26	11	3	12	52	61	−9	25	
9	Tractorul Săveni	26	10	4	12	52	58	−6	24	
10	Volanul Botoșani	26	10	2	14	52	60	−8	22	
11	Foresta Gura Humorului	26	6	6	14	36	71	−35	18	
12	Unirea Siret	26	6	3	17	41	65	−24	15	
13	Gloria Dorohoi	26	6	1	19	30	121	−91	13	
14	Siretul Bucecea	26	4	2	20	19	101	−82	10	

Rules for classification: 1) points; 2) goal difference; 3) number of goals scored.
(C) Champions; (Q) Qualified for the phase indicated

== See also ==
- 1963–64 Divizia A
- 1963–64 Divizia B
- 1963–64 Divizia C
- 1963–64 Cupa României
