= 1963–64 Divizia C =

Romanian third-tier football league season

Divizia C
- Season: 1963–64

The 1963–64 Divizia C was the 8th season of Liga III, the third tier of the Romanian football league system. This was the first Divizia C season held after a four-year break. The competition brought together ten teams relegated from the previous Divizia B season and thirty-eight others that had qualified through the regional championships. The teams were divided into four geographical series of twelve each.

At the end of the season, Laminorul Brăila in the East Series, CFR Roșiori in the South Series, Vagonul Arad in the West Series, and Recolta Carei in the North Series topped their respective series and secured promotion to the 1964–65 Divizia B.

== Team changes ==
=== To Divizia C ===
Relegated from Divizia B

- Rapid Focșani
- Flamura Roșie Tecuci
- Dinamo Obor București
- Progresul Alexandria
- CFR Roșiori
- Metalul Turnu Severin
- Recolta Carei
- Vagonul Arad
- Steaua Dej
- CFR-IRTA Arad

Promoted from Regional Championship

- Metalul Pitești
- Muscelul UMM Câmpulung
- Chimia Onești
- Petrolul Moinești
- Textila Buhuși
- Electromotor Timișoara
- Teba Arad
- Metrom Brașov
- Textila Sfântu Gheorghe
- Faianța Sighisoara
- Flacăra Roșie București
- Tehnometal București
- Unirea Răcari
- Victoria Giurgiu
- Gloria Bistrița
- Soda Ocna Mureș
- Steaua Roșie Salonta
- Dinamo Oraș Dr. Petru Groza
- Portul Constanța
- Electrica Constanța
- Metalosport Galați
- Laminorul Brăila
- Victoria Călan
- Minerul Deva
- Siderurgistul Hunedoara
- Rulmentul Bârlad
- Moldova Iași
- Minerul Baia Sprie
- Metalurgistul Baia Mare
- Rapid Târgu Mureș
- Chimica Târnăveni
- AS Târgu Jiu
- Tractorul Corabia
- Electroputere Craiova
- Rapid Mizil
- MIG Fieni
- Dinamo Suceava
- Unirea Botoșani

=== Renamed teams ===
Rapid Focșani was renamed Fructexport Focșani.

Dinamo Obor București was renamed Dinamo Victoria București.

Steaua Dej was renamed Unirea Dej.

CFR-IRTA Arad was renamed CFR Arad.

Dinamo Oraș Dr. Petru Groza was renamed Minerul Bihor.

AS Târgu Jiu was renamed Pandurii Târgu Jiu.

MIG Fieni was renamed Electrica Fieni.

=== Other changes ===
Laminorul Brăila merged with Progresul Brăila, which had been relegated to the regional championship due to a match-fixing scandal, with the former being absorbed by the latter.

== League tables ==
=== East Series ===
Pos	Team	Pld	W	D	L	GF	GA	GD	Pts	Promotion or relegation
1	Laminorul Brăila (C, P)	22	13	4	5	52	19	+33	30	Promotion to Divizia B
2	Flamura Roșie Tecuci	22	11	5	6	45	24	+21	27	
3	Dinamo Suceava	22	10	5	7	31	22	+9	25	
4	Rapid Mizil	22	11	1	10	28	35	−7	23	
5	Chimia Onești	22	9	4	9	28	22	+6	22	
6	Textila Buhuși	22	9	4	9	34	35	−1	22	
7	Moldova Iași	22	9	3	10	28	35	−7	21	
8	Fructexport Focșani	22	8	4	10	28	31	−3	20	
9	Unirea Botoșani	22	9	2	11	30	35	−5	20	
10	Rulmentul Bârlad	22	7	5	10	31	53	−22	19	
11	Metalosport Galați	22	7	4	11	30	43	−13	18	Spared from relegation
12	Petrolul Moinești	22	7	3	12	29	40	−11	17	Spared from relegation

(C) Champions; (P) Promoted

=== South Series ===
Pos	Team	Pld	W	D	L	GF	GA	GD	Pts	Promotion or relegation
1	CFR Roșiori (C, P)	22	13	4	5	32	12	+20	30	Promotion to Divizia B
2	Victoria Giurgiu	22	13	4	5	50	25	+25	30	
3	Dinamo Victoria București	22	13	2	7	46	23	+23	28	
4	Flacăra Roșie București	22	9	6	7	30	27	+3	24	
5	Metalul Pitești	22	9	5	8	29	40	−11	23	
6	Tehnometal București	22	9	3	10	24	38	−14	21	
7	Electrica Fieni	22	8	4	10	29	42	−13	20	
8	Unirea Răcari	22	7	4	11	32	30	+2	18	
9	Electrica Constanța	22	7	4	11	34	41	−7	18	
10	Progresul Alexandria	22	5	8	9	23	37	−14	18	
11	Portul Constanța	22	8	1	13	33	34	−1	17	Spared from relegation
12	Muscelul Câmpulung	22	7	3	12	27	40	−13	17	Spared from relegation

(C) Champions; (P) Promoted

=== West Series ===
Pos	Team	Pld	W	D	L	GF	GA	GD	Pts	Promotion or relegation
1	Vagonul Arad (C, P)	22	15	2	5	59	19	+40	32	Promotion to Divizia B
2	Metalul Turnu Severin	22	13	3	6	38	32	+6	29	
3	Pandurii Târgu Jiu	22	11	2	9	35	26	+9	24	
4	Siderurgistul Hunedoara	22	10	4	8	32	37	−5	24	
5	CFR Arad	22	8	7	7	27	27	0	23	
6	Victoria Călan	22	10	3	9	29	31	−2	23	
7	Electromotor Timișoara	22	8	6	8	29	32	−3	22	
8	Tractorul Corabia	22	8	4	10	35	36	−1	20	
9	Minerul Deva	22	7	6	9	29	34	−5	20	
10	Electroputere Craiova	22	8	3	11	32	34	−2	19	
11	Steaua Roșie Salonta	22	7	4	11	25	37	−12	18	Spared from relegation
12	Teba Arad	22	3	4	15	20	45	−25	10	Spared from relegation

(C) Champions; (P) Promoted

=== North Series ===
Pos	Team	Pld	W	D	L	GF	GA	GD	Pts	Promotion or relegation
1	Recolta Carei (C, P)	22	13	3	6	51	25	+26	29	Promotion to Divizia B
2	Soda Ocna Mureș	22	12	2	8	39	32	+7	26	
3	Gloria Bistrița	22	12	1	9	46	30	+16	25	
4	Unirea Dej	22	10	5	7	48	36	+12	25	
5	Faianța Sighisoara	22	9	6	7	33	33	0	24	
6	Metrom Brașov	22	10	3	9	40	29	+11	23	
7	Minerul Baia Sprie	22	10	1	11	27	32	−5	21	
8	Chimica Târnăveni	22	8	5	9	29	35	−6	21	
9	Minerul Bihor	22	9	2	11	31	42	−11	20	
10	Textila Sfântu Gheorghe	22	8	3	11	24	29	−5	19	
11	Rapid Târgu Mureș	22	9	1	12	34	47	−13	19	Spared from relegation
12	Metalurgistul Baia Mare	22	5	2	15	20	52	−32	12	Spared from relegation

(C) Champions; (P) Promoted

== See also ==
- 1963–64 Divizia A
- 1963–64 Divizia B
- 1963–64 Regional Championship
- 1963–64 Cupa României
