= 1962–63 Divizia B =

Divizia B
- Season: 1962–63
- Promoted: Siderurgistul Galați; Dinamo Pitești; Crișul Oradea
- Relegated: Carpați Sinaia; Prahova Ploiești; Progresul Brăila; Dinamo Obor București; Recolta Carei; IMU Medgidia; Progresul Alexandria; Vagonul Arad; Rapid Focșani; CFR Roșiori; Steaua Dej; Flamura Roșie Tecuci; Metalul Turnu Severin; CFR-IRTA Arad

The 1962–63 Divizia B was the 23rd season of the second tier of the Romanian football league system.

The format has been maintained to three series, each of them having 14 teams. At the end of the season the winners of the series promoted to Divizia A and the last four places from each series relegated to Divizia C.

== Team changes ==
=== To Divizia B ===
Promoted from Regional Championship

- AS Cugir
- Flamura Roșie Tecuci
- IMU Medgidia
- Metalul Turnu Severin
- Progresul Alexandria
- Unirea Dej

Relegated from Divizia A

- Jiul Petroșani
- Metalul Târgoviște
- Dinamo Pitești

=== From Divizia B ===
Relegated to Regional Championship

- Dinamo Suceava
- Olimpia București
- Rapid Târgu Mureș
- Steaua Roșie Bacău
- Portul Constanța
- Corvinul Hunedoara

Promoted to Divizia A

- CSMS Iași
- Farul Constanța
- Crișana Oradea

=== Renamed teams ===
CFR Arad was renamed as CFR-IRTA Arad.

Chimia Govora was renamed as Unirea Râmnicu Vâlcea.

CSM Mediaș was renamed as Gaz Metan Mediaș.

CSM Baia Mare was renamed as Minerul Baia Mare.

CSO Brăila was renamed as Progresul Brăila.

CSO Timișoara was renamed as CFR Timișoara.

Unirea Dej was renamed as Steaua Dej.

=== Other teams ===
Jiul Petroșani was moved from Petroșani to Petrila and renamed as Jiul Petrila.

== League tables ==
=== Serie I ===
Pos	Team	Pld	W	D	L	GF	GA	GD	Pts	Promotion or relegation
1	Siderurgistul Galați (C, P)	26	15	5	6	46	27	+19	35	Promotion to Divizia A
2	Metalul Târgoviște	26	14	4	8	56	24	+32	32	
3	Foresta Fălticeni	26	12	3	11	38	37	+1	27	
4	CFR Pașcani	26	12	3	11	35	46	−11	27	
5	Poiana Câmpina	26	11	4	11	47	39	+8	26	
6	Flacăra Moreni	26	10	6	10	43	39	+4	26	
7	Carpați Sinaia (R)	26	11	4	11	38	34	+4	26	Relegation to Local Championship
8	Știința Galați	26	11	4	11	34	38	−4	26	
9	Prahova Ploiești (R)	26	11	4	11	31	37	−6	26	Relegation to Local Championship
10	Ceahlăul Piatra Neamț	26	12	2	12	36	48	−12	26	
11	Progresul Brăila (R)	26	10	4	12	45	49	−4	24	Relegation to Local Championship
12	IMU Medgidia (R)	26	9	5	12	42	41	+1	23	Relegation to Local Championship
13	Rapid Focșani (R)	26	8	2	16	24	51	−27	18	Relegation to Divizia C
14	Flamura Roșie Tecuci (R)	26	6	4	16	33	56	−23	16	Relegation to Divizia C

Source: romaniansoccer.ro
Rules for classification: 1) Points 2) Head-to-head points; 3) Head-to-head goal difference; 4) Head-to-head goals scored; 5) Head-to-head away goals scored; 6) Goal difference; 7) Goals scored.
(C) Champions; (P) Promoted; (R) Relegated

=== Serie II ===
Pos	Team	Pld	W	D	L	GF	GA	GD	Pts	Promotion or relegation
1	Dinamo Pitești (C, P)	26	16	4	6	56	24	+32	36	Promotion to Divizia A
2	CSM Reșița	26	14	4	8	65	33	+32	32	
3	CSM Sibiu	26	14	3	9	48	39	+9	31	
4	Chimia Făgăraș	26	13	2	11	48	45	+3	28	
5	Știința Craiova	26	9	8	9	49	41	+8	26	
6	Unirea Râmnicu Vâlcea	26	9	8	9	29	28	+1	26	
7	Gaz Metan Mediaș	26	11	4	11	41	45	−4	26	
8	Știința București	26	10	6	10	39	47	−8	26	
9	Metalul București	26	11	3	12	32	27	+5	25	
10	Tractorul Brașov	26	12	1	13	41	48	−7	25	
11	Dinamo Obor București (R)	26	9	5	12	42	43	−1	23	Relegation to Divizia C
12	Progresul Alexandria (R)	26	8	7	11	33	57	−24	23	Relegation to Divizia C
13	CFR Roșiori (R)	26	9	4	13	26	41	−15	22	Relegation to Divizia C
14	Metalul Turnu Severin (R)	26	5	5	16	32	63	−31	15	Relegation to Divizia C

Source: romaniansoccer.ro
Rules for classification: 1) Points 2) Head-to-head points; 3) Head-to-head goal difference; 4) Head-to-head goals scored; 5) Head-to-head away goals scored; 6) Goal difference; 7) Goals scored.
(C) Champions; (P) Promoted; (R) Relegated

=== Serie III ===
Pos	Team	Pld	W	D	L	GF	GA	GD	Pts	Promotion or relegation
1	Crișul Oradea (C, P)	26	14	9	3	44	22	+22	37	Promotion to Divizia A
2	CFR Timișoara	26	13	4	9	52	50	+2	30	
3	Minerul Baia Mare	26	14	1	11	44	35	+9	29	
4	IS Câmpia Turzii	26	11	6	9	45	44	+1	28	
5	CSM Cluj	26	10	7	9	40	30	+10	27	
6	Cugir	26	10	7	9	34	37	−3	27	
7	Jiul Petrila	26	9	8	9	36	24	+12	26	
8	Arieșul Turda	26	9	8	9	30	31	−1	26	
9	Mureșul Târgu Mureș	26	10	6	10	27	29	−2	26	
10	ASMD Satu Mare	26	9	8	9	26	29	−3	26	
11	Recolta Carei (R)	26	8	7	11	40	48	−8	23	Relegation to Divizia C
12	Vagonul Arad (R)	26	7	8	11	28	32	−4	22	Relegation to Divizia C
13	Steaua Dej (R)	26	7	8	11	32	51	−19	22	Relegation to Divizia C
14	CFR-IRTA Arad (R)	26	5	5	16	27	43	−16	15	Relegation to Divizia C

Source: romaniansoccer.ro
Rules for classification: 1) Points 2) Head-to-head points; 3) Head-to-head goal difference; 4) Head-to-head goals scored; 5) Head-to-head away goals scored; 6) Goal difference; 7) Goals scored.
(C) Champions; (P) Promoted; (R) Relegated

== See also ==
- 1962–63 Divizia A
- 1962–63 Regional Championship
- 1962–63 Cupa României
