= 1962–63 Regional Championship =

21st season of the Liga IV, the fourth tier of the Romanian football league

Liga IV
- Season: 1962–63

The 1962–63 Regional Championship was the 21st season of the Regional Championship, 10th as the third tier of Romanian football. It was the last season as 3rd tier for the regional championship, as Divizia C was re-established from the next season.

The promotion play-off did not take place this season, due to the top teams from each regional championship was promoted to the 1963–64 Divizia C.

== Regional championships ==
- Argeș (AG)
- Bacău (BC)
- Banat (BA)
- Brașov (BV)
- Bucharest Municipality (B)
- Bucharest Region (B)
- Cluj (CJ)
- Crișana (CR)
- Dobrogea (DO)
- Galați (GL)
- Hunedoara (HD)
- Iași (IS)
- Maramureș (MM)
- Mureș (MS)
- Oltenia (OL)
- Ploiești (PL)
- Suceava (SV)

=== Argeș Region ===
Pos	Team	Pld	W	D	L	GF	GA	GD	Pts	Qualification or relegation
1	Metalul Pitești (C, P)	30	21	8	1	96	16	+80	50	Promotion to Divizia C
2	Muscelul UMM Câmpulung (P)	30	21	7	2	78	24	+54	49	Promotion to Divizia C
3	Minerul Câmpulung	30	18	3	9	82	29	+53	39	
4	Oltul Drăgănești-Olt	30	13	7	10	52	51	+1	33	
5	Foresta Stâlpeni	30	13	6	11	48	41	+7	32	
6	Oltul Râmnicu Vâlcea	30	10	9	11	48	54	−6	29	
7	Unirea Drăgășani	30	11	7	12	47	53	−6	29	
8	Textilistul Pitești	30	9	8	13	36	43	−7	26	
9	Victoria Slatina	30	9	8	13	35	45	−10	26	
10	Unirea Slatina	30	9	8	13	37	60	−23	26	
11	ASVP Găești	30	9	7	14	34	72	−38	25	
12	Progresul Băiculești	30	9	6	15	52	60	−8	24	
13	Recolta Stoicănești	30	10	4	16	46	64	−18	24	
14	Rapid Piatra-Olt	30	10	3	17	37	56	−19	23	
15	Lotru Brezoi	30	8	7	15	29	62	−33	23	
16	Rapid Pitești	30	7	8	15	37	64	−27	22	

Rules for classification: 1) points; 2) goal difference; 3) number of goals scored.
(C) Champions; (P) Promoted

=== Bacău Region ===
Pos	Team	Pld	W	D	L	GF	GA	GD	Pts	Qualification or relegation
1	Chimia Onești (C, P)	26	19	4	3	59	23	+36	42	Promotion to Divizia C
2	Petrolul Moinești (P)	26	19	2	5	58	22	+36	40	Promotion to Divizia C
3	Textila Buhuși (P)	26	18	3	5	76	21	+55	39	Promotion to Divizia C
4	Laminorul Roman	26	15	9	2	53	17	+36	39	
5	Bradul Roznov	26	11	6	9	42	41	+1	28	
6	Minerul Comănești	26	10	5	11	31	38	−7	25	
7	Cetatea Târgu Neamț	26	7	8	11	34	41	−7	22	
8	Victoria Piatra Neamț	26	8	6	12	36	44	−8	22	
9	Petrolul Dărmănești	26	8	5	13	33	50	−17	21	
10	Celuloza Piatra Neamț	26	6	8	12	32	46	−14	20	
11	Oituz Târgu Ocna	26	6	8	12	24	35	−11	20	
12	Locomotiva Adjud	26	5	6	15	24	50	−26	16	
13	Bradul Bacău	26	4	7	15	26	60	−34	15	
14	Victoria Bacău	26	4	7	15	28	68	−40	15	

Rules for classification: 1) points; 2) goal difference; 3) number of goals scored.
(C) Champions; (P) Promoted

=== Banat Region ===
Pos	Team	Pld	W	D	L	GF	GA	GAv	Pts	Qualification or relegation
1	Electromotor Timișoara (C, P)	30	18	6	6	52	27	1.926	42 (Note: Electromotor are ahead of Teba on goals average coefficient.)	Promotion to Divizia C
2	Teba Arad (P)	30	16	10	4	65	34	1.912	42	Promotion to Divizia C
3	Dinamo Timișoara	30	15	8	7	64	39	1.641	38	
4	Oravița	30	14	8	8	46	31	1.484	36	
5	Metalul Bocșa	30	14	7	9	55	39	1.410	35	
6	Minerul Anina	30	14	5	11	42	43	0.977	33	
7	Metalul Oțelu Roșu	30	14	4	12	67	40	1.675	32	
8	Șoimii Timișoara	30	12	8	10	44	41	1.073	32	
9	Ceramica Jimbolia	30	13	5	12	45	42	1.071	31	
10	Furnirul Deta	30	12	6	12	47	53	0.887	30	
11	Olimpia Reșița	30	10	8	12	45	51	0.882	28	
12	ICA Arad	30	11	3	16	42	44	0.955	25	
13	Stăruința Timișoara	30	11	2	17	48	57	0.842	24	
14	CFR Caransebeș	30	8	6	16	34	48	0.708	22	
15	Recolta Jimbolia	30	8	1	21	27	70	0.386	17	
16	Laminorul Nădrag	30	3	7	20	28	82	0.341	13	

Rules for classification: 1) points; 2) goal difference; 3) number of goals scored.
(C) Champions; (P) Promoted

=== Brașov Region ===
Pos	Team	Pld	W	D	L	GF	GA	GD	Pts	Qualification or relegation
1	Metrom Brașov (C, P)	30	17	7	6	60	27	+33	41	Promotion to Divizia C
2	Textila Sfântu Gheorghe (P)	30	18	5	7	62	30	+32	41	Promotion to Divizia C
3	Faianța Sighisoara (P)	30	16	8	6	56	26	+30	40	Promotion to Divizia C
4	Metalul Copșa Mică	30	17	4	9	55	33	+22	38	
5	Colorom Codlea	30	17	4	9	63	46	+17	38	
6	Rulmentul Brașov	30	13	10	7	55	30	+25	36	
7	ASA Sibiu	30	12	8	10	54	49	+5	32	
8	Precizia Săcele	30	10	10	10	36	33	+3	30	
9	Textila Mediaș	30	12	6	12	60	61	−1	30	
10	Torpedo Zărnești	30	12	4	14	38	46	−8	28	
11	Textila Prejmer	30	11	4	15	46	67	−21	26	
12	Elastic Sibiu	30	9	6	15	34	55	−21	24	
13	Vitrometan Mediaș	30	9	4	17	50	74	−24	22	
14	Chimia Victoria	30	9	4	17	33	62	−29	22	
15	Constructorul Sibiu	30	8	5	17	42	60	−18	21	
16	Hidromecanica Brașov	30	3	5	22	24	69	−45	11	

Rules for classification: 1) points; 2) goal difference; 3) number of goals scored.
(C) Champions; (P) Promoted

=== Bucharest Municipality ===
Series I

The ranking combined the results of the senior and junior teams.

Pos	Team	Pld	W	D	L	+	W	D	L	GF	GA	GD	Pts	Qualification or relegation
1	Flacăra Roșie București (P, Q)	52	15	9	2	+	18	5	3	134	33	+101	80	Promotion to Divizia C & qualification to championship final
1	TUG București	52	12	6	8	+	17	6	3	127	49	+78	70	
3	Vestitorul București	52	19	5	12	+	18	4	4	118	77	+41	63	
4	Constructorul CFR București	52	9	5	12	+	17	5	4	96	81	+15	62	
5	Timpuri Noi București	52	13	7	6	+	11	4	11	84	58	+26	59	
6	Abatorul București	52	7	11	8	+	13	6	7	102	72	+30	57	
7	Voința București	52	13	5	8	+	9	6	11	99	72	+27	55	
8	Bumbacul București	52	12	9	5	+	8	3	15	94	118	−24	52	
9	Icar București	52	7	5	14	+	13	6	7	99	89	+10	51	
10	Electronica București	52	15	9	2	+	1	5	20	74	131	−57	48	
11	ICAB București	52	8	7	11	+	8	4	14	57	92	−35	43	
12	Quadrat București	52	6	4	16	+	7	4	15	78	138	−60	34	
13	Aeronautica București	52	4	7	15	+	7	5	14	61	111	−50	34	
14	Ulei București	52	5	5	16	+	2	3	21	42	164	−122	22	

Rules for classification: 1) Points; 2) Goal difference; 3) Number of goals scored.
(P) Promoted; (Q) Qualified for the phase indicated

Series II

The ranking combined the results of the senior and junior teams.

Pos	Team	Pld	W	D	L	+	W	D	L	GF	GA	GD	Pts	Qualification or relegation
1	Tehnometal București (P, Q)	52	16	5	5	+	15	4	7	134	55	+79	71	Promotion to Divizia C & qualification to championship final
1	Vulcan București	52	10	9	7	+	18	4	4	116	64	+52	69	
3	Laminorul București	52	8	6	12	+	16	8	2	123	65	+58	62	
4	Gloria București	52	12	9	5	+	11	6	9	83	66	+17	61	
5	Sirena București	52	9	5	12	+	14	8	4	105	80	+25	59	
6	Metalul Floreasca	52	11	6	9	+	13	5	8	89	69	+20	59	
7	Autobuzul București	52	10	6	10	+	13	3	10	102	87	+15	55	
8	Chimia București	52	7	9	10	+	13	5	8	87	79	+8	54	
9	Confecția București	52	4	10	12	+	12	6	8	77	78	−1	48	
10	IOR București	52	10	7	9	+	7	5	14	96	101	−5	46	
11	FRB București	52	10	7	9	+	6	4	16	75	116	−41	43	
12	IPROFIL București	52	14	8	4	+	2	2	22	71	143	−72	42	
13	Petrolul București	52	9	6	11	+	3	5	18	78	130	−52	35	
14	ITB București	52	2	7	17	+	5	3	18	59	161	−102	24	

Rules for classification: 1) Points; 2) Goal difference; 3) Number of goals scored.
(P) Promoted; (Q) Qualified for the phase indicated

Championship final

To determine the champion of the city of Bucharest, the winners of the two series played a playoff of two games, the junior teams was also participate, whose results counted as in the first stage of the championship. The matches was played on 28 June 1963 at Giulești Stadium and on 3 July 1963 at Timpuri Noi Stadium.

Team 1	Agg.	Team 2	1st leg	2nd leg
Senior matches				
Flacăra Roșie București	7–4	Tehnometal București	3–2	4–2
Junior matches				
Flacăra Roșie București	4–3	Tehnometal București	1–1	3–2

Flacăra Roșie București won the Bucharest Municipal Championship.

=== Bucharest Region ===
Pos	Team	Pld	W	D	L	GF	GA	GD	Pts	Qualification or relegation
1	Unirea Răcari (C, P)	30	19	8	3	74	29	+45	46	Promotion to Divizia C
2	Victoria Giurgiu (P)	30	18	8	4	59	20	+39	44	Promotion to Divizia C
3	Dunărea Giurgiu	30	18	6	6	81	22	+59	42	
4	Șantierul Naval Oltenița	30	12	10	8	45	22	+23	34	
5	Sporting Roșiori	30	12	8	10	52	54	−2	32	
6	Celuloza Călărași	30	12	7	11	44	40	+4	31	
7	Oltul Turnu Măgurele	30	11	8	11	49	44	+5	30	
8	Flacăra Bărăganul	30	10	8	12	39	34	+5	28	
9	Unirea Mănăstirea	30	9	9	12	48	51	−3	27	
10	Locomotiva Fetești	30	10	7	13	34	48	−14	27	
11	Victoria Lehliu	30	12	3	15	47	65	−18	27	
12	Avântul Slobozia	30	11	5	14	51	73	−22	27	
13	Voința Urziceni	30	9	4	17	34	61	−27	22	
14	Dunărea Zimnicea	30	9	4	17	33	66	−33	22	
15	Spicul Cacaleți	30	9	3	18	29	55	−26	21	
16	Flacăra Videle	30	8	4	18	31	57	−26	20	

Rules for classification: 1) points; 2) goal difference; 3) number of goals scored.
(C) Champions; (P) Promoted

=== Crișana Region ===
Pos	Team	Pld	W	D	L	GF	GA	GD	Pts	Qualification or relegation
1	Steaua Roșie Salonta (C, P)	26	19	4	3	68	25	+43	42	Promotion to Divizia C
2	Dinamo Oraș Dr. Petru Groza (P)	26	14	6	6	46	28	+18	34	Promotion to Divizia C
3	Voința Oradea	26	15	2	9	60	40	+20	32	
4	Dinamo Oradea	26	13	2	11	43	39	+4	28	
5	Recolta Valea lui Mihai	25	10	7	8	56	29	+27	27	
6	Victoria Ineu	24	10	6	8	45	27	+18	26	
7	Blănuri Oradea	26	11	3	12	46	53	−7	25	
8	Minerul Șuncuiuș	26	10	5	11	37	45	−8	25	
9	Măgura Șimleu Silvaniei	25	8	8	9	38	44	−6	24	
10	Stăruința Săcuieni	26	8	5	13	48	56	−8	21	
11	Spartacus Oradea	26	8	4	14	37	56	−19	20	
12	Crișul Ineu	26	8	3	15	36	53	−17	19	
13	Unirea Sântana	25	6	7	12	27	43	−16	19	
14	Crișana Sebiș	25	6	4	15	26	75	−49	16	

Rules for classification: 1) points; 2) goal difference; 3) number of goals scored.
(C) Champions; (P) Promoted

=== Dobrogea Region ===
Pos	Team	Pld	W	D	L	GF	GA	GD	Pts	Qualification or relegation
1	Portul Constanța (C, P)	28	22	3	3	64	10	+54	47	Promotion to Divizia C
2	Electrica Constanța (P)	28	18	9	1	80	19	+61	45	Promotion to Divizia C
3	Marina Mangalia	28	17	4	7	71	32	+39	38	
4	Cimentul Medgidia	28	15	5	8	52	23	+29	35	
5	Stuful Tulcea	28	10	8	10	38	43	−5	28	
6	Callatis Mangalia	28	10	7	11	45	47	−2	27	
7	Petrolul Constanța	28	9	8	11	36	43	−7	26	
8	Răsăritul Sulina	28	8	9	11	40	59	−19	25	
9	Ideal Cernavodă	28	11	2	15	38	45	−7	24	
10	CFR Constanța	28	8	7	13	34	48	−14	23	
11	Recolta Negru Vodă	28	10	2	16	56	69	−13	22	
12	Spartac Constanța	28	6	10	12	29	65	−36	22	
13	Victoria Saligny	28	8	5	15	29	47	−18	21	
14	Dinamo Constanța	28	7	5	16	26	43	−17	19	
15	Înfrățirea Cogealac	28	6	6	16	29	74	−45	18	

Rules for classification: 1) points; 2) goal difference; 3) number of goals scored.
(C) Champions; (P) Promoted

=== Galați Region ===
Pos	Team	Pld	W	D	L	GF	GA	GD	Pts	Qualification or relegation
1	Metalosport Galați (C, P)	30	19	7	4	76	32	+44	45	Promotion to Divizia C
2	Laminorul Brăila (P)	30	19	6	5	67	27	+40	44	Promotion to Divizia C
3	Constructorul Brăila	30	18	6	6	71	33	+38	42	
4	Ancora Galați	30	17	5	8	65	32	+33	39	
5	Marina Brăila	30	11	10	9	49	42	+7	32	
6	Gloria CFR Galați	30	11	7	12	58	48	+10	29	
7	Mecanizatorul Făurei	30	10	9	11	37	53	−16	29	
8	Dunărea Brăila	30	10	8	12	46	51	−5	28	
9	Celuloza Brăila	30	10	8	12	31	45	−14	28	
10	Chimica Mărășești	30	9	9	12	40	51	−11	27	
11	Voința Focșani	30	8	10	12	37	56	−19	26	
12	Victoria Gugești	30	10	6	14	36	53	−17	26	
13	Avântul Tărgu Bujor	30	7	11	12	43	53	−10	25	
14	Tractorul Viziru	30	11	3	16	42	54	−12	25	
15	Tractorul Nănești	30	9	7	14	43	58	−15	25	
16	Muncitorul Ghidigeni (R)	30	3	4	23	21	74	−53	10	Relegation to Galați District Championship

Rules for classification: 1) points; 2) goal difference; 3) number of goals scored.
(C) Champions; (P) Promoted; (R) Relegated

=== Hunedoara Region ===
Pos	Team	Pld	W	D	L	GF	GA	GAv	Pts	Qualification or relegation
1	Victoria Călan (C, P)	30	18	9	3	66	21	3.143	45	Promotion to Divizia C
2	Minerul Deva (P)	30	20	3	7	81	33	2.455	43	Promotion to Divizia C
3	Siderurgistul Hunedoara (P)	30	16	6	8	49	30	1.633	38	Promotion to Divizia C
4	Minerul Vulcan	30	16	1	13	58	50	1.160	33	
5	Aurul Brad	30	14	3	13	65	47	1.383	31	
6	Parângul Lonea	30	12	6	12	48	47	1.021	30	
7	Minerul Aninoasa	30	11	7	12	50	51	0.980	29	
8	Jiul Petrila II	30	11	7	12	40	49	0.816	29	
9	Sebeșul Sebeș	30	12	4	14	50	60	0.833	28	
10	CFR Simeria	30	11	5	14	56	56	1.000	27	
11	Minerul Ghelari	30	11	4	15	53	58	0.914	26	
12	Constructorul Hunedoara	30	9	7	14	42	61	0.689	25	
13	Retezatul Hațeg	30	9	7	14	42	73	0.575	25	
14	Dacia Alba Iulia	30	10	5	15	37	71	0.521	25	
15	Dacia Orăștie	30	10	4	16	50	60	0.833	24	
16	CFR Teiuș	30	9	4	17	55	65	0.846	22	

Rules for classification: 1) points; 2) goal difference; 3) number of goals scored.
(C) Champions; (P) Promoted

=== Iași Region ===
Pos	Team	Pld	W	D	L	GF	GA	GAv	Pts	Qualification or relegation
1	Rulmentul Bârlad (C, P)	26	23	1	2	95	10	9.500	47	Promotion to Divizia C
2	Moldova Iași (P)	26	22	2	2	114	19	6.000	46	Promotion to Divizia C
3	Dinamo Iași	26	13	8	5	69	23	3.000	34	
4	Progresul Vaslui	26	11	6	9	30	50	0.600	28	
5	Rapid Bârlad	26	11	5	10	57	58	0.983	27	
6	Gloria Bârlad	26	11	4	11	46	44	1.045	26	
7	Victoria Vaslui	26	10	6	10	42	36	1.167	26	
8	Știința IMF Iași	26	10	4	12	42	57	0.737	24	
9	Țesătura Iași	26	9	4	13	36	52	0.692	22	
10	Progresul Iași	26	9	1	16	30	49	0.612	19	
11	Constructorul Iași (Note: Constructorul Iași and Progresul Huși have one match less played, as they were penalized by the regional committee with a 0–3 loss for fielding ineligible players.)	25	8	2	15	40	65	0.615	18	
12	Progresul Huși	25	8	2	15	35	81	0.432	18	
13	Flacăra Murgeni	26	8	1	17	39	86	0.453	17	
14	Unirea Negrești	26	4	2	20	30	75	0.400	10	

Rules for classification: 1) points; 2) goal difference; 3) number of goals scored.
(C) Champions; (P) Promoted

=== Maramureș Region ===
Pos	Team	Pld	W	D	L	GF	GA	GAv	Pts	Qualification or relegation
1	Minerul Baia Sprie (C, P)	30	20	3	7	87	35	2.486	43	Promotion to Divizia C
2	Metalurgistul Baia Mare (P)	30	18	6	6	79	32	2.469	42	Promotion to Divizia C
3	Unio Satu Mare	30	17	7	6	77	31	2.484	41	
4	Recolta Tășnad	30	17	2	11	59	59	1.000	36	
5	Forestiera Sighetu Marmației	30	14	6	10	73	43	1.698	34	
6	Minerul Cavnic	30	14	5	11	55	49	1.122	33	
7	Metalul Satu Mare	30	15	3	12	47	48	0.979	33	
8	Carpați Sighetu Marmației	30	12	7	11	40	35	1.143	31	
9	Flamura Roșie Satu Mare	30	13	5	12	41	43	0.953	31	
10	Minerul Strâmbu-Băiuț	30	11	8	11	55	59	0.932	30	
11	Recolta Urziceni	30	9	11	10	37	37	1.000	29	
12	Constructorul Baia Mare	30	11	7	12	48	57	0.842	29	
13	Rapid Satu Mare	30	8	6	16	40	70	0.571	22	
14	Minerul Baia Borșa	30	8	5	17	41	56	0.732	21	
15	Cehu Silvaniei	30	6	2	22	28	97	0.289	14	
16	Oțelul Baia Mare (Note: Oțelul Baia Mare withdrew from the championship after 24 rounds and lost all remaining matches with 0–3.)	30	4	3	23	21	71	0.296	11	

Rules for classification: 1) points; 2) goal difference; 3) number of goals scored.
(C) Champions; (P) Promoted

=== Mureș Region ===
Pos	Team	Pld	W	D	L	GF	GA	GD	Pts	Qualification or relegation
1	Rapid Târgu Mureș (C, P)	30	20	4	6	72	41	+31	44	Promotion to Divizia C
2	Chimica Târnăveni (P)	30	18	6	6	72	31	+41	42	Promotion to Divizia C
3	Lemnarul Târgu Mureș	30	12	12	6	53	40	+13	36	
4	ASM Odorheiu Secuiesc	30	14	7	9	52	33	+19	35	
5	Voința Târgu Mureș	30	13	8	9	47	36	+11	34	
6	Avântul Reghin	30	14	4	12	56	48	+8	32	
7	Străduința Cristuru Secuiesc	30	11	10	9	57	52	+5	32	
8	Energia Fântânele	30	12	6	12	53	55	−2	30	
9	Gloria Târgu Mureș	30	11	8	11	34	39	−5	30	
10	Ciocanul Târgu Mureș	30	10	8	12	53	50	+3	28	
11	Voința Târnăveni	30	10	5	15	47	53	−6	25	
12	Oțelul Târgu Mureș	30	10	5	15	44	50	−6	25	
13	Mureșul Toplița	30	10	5	15	46	68	−22	25	
14	Metalul Vlăhița	30	10	1	19	34	62	−28	21	
15	Mureșul Luduș	30	7	7	16	31	58	−27	21	
16	Rapid Odorheiu Secuiesc	30	8	4	18	26	61	−35	20	

Rules for classification: 1) points; 2) goal difference; 3) number of goals scored.
(C) Champions; (P) Promoted

=== Oltenia Region ===
Pos	Team	Pld	W	D	L	GF	GA	GD	Pts	Qualification or relegation
1	AS Târgu Jiu (C, P)	30	23	4	3	76	26	+50	50	Promotion to Divizia C
2	Tractorul Corabia (P)	30	20	5	5	78	29	+49	45	Promotion to Divizia C
3	Electroputere Craiova (P)	30	19	4	7	75	27	+48	42	Promotion to Divizia C
4	Metalul 7 Noiembrie Craiova	30	14	6	10	56	38	+18	34	
5	Victoria Caracal	30	14	6	10	56	44	+12	34	
6	Progresul Strehaia	30	15	3	12	55	47	+8	33	
7	Progresul Balș	30	13	5	12	45	44	+1	31	
8	Progresul Turnu Severin	30	12	5	13	51	56	−5	29	
9	Progresul Băilești	30	11	6	13	54	64	−10	28	
10	Metalurgistul Sadu	30	10	7	13	49	55	−6	27	
11	Dunărea Calafat	30	10	6	14	45	55	−10	26	
12	Unirea Caracal	30	11	4	15	38	50	−12	26	
13	Progresul Segarcea	30	12	2	16	42	52	−10	26	
14	Progresul Filiași	30	7	6	17	30	58	−28	20	
15	Dunărea Turnu Severin	30	6	8	16	37	76	−39	20	
16	Progresul Bălcești	30	1	7	22	19	85	−66	9	

Rules for classification: 1) points; 2) goal difference; 3) number of goals scored.
(C) Champions; (P) Promoted

=== Ploiești Region ===
Pos	Team	Pld	W	D	L	GF	GA	GD	Pts	Qualification or relegation
1	Rapid Mizil (C, P)	26	16	6	4	62	25	+37	38	Promotion to Divizia C
2	MIG Fieni (P)	26	15	5	6	52	22	+30	35	Promotion to Divizia C
3	Victoria Moreni	26	14	7	5	48	22	+26	35	
4	Unitex Pucioasa	26	15	3	8	62	37	+25	33	
5	Rafinăria Teleajen	26	13	3	10	60	39	+21	29	
6	Rapid Plopeni	26	11	6	9	43	26	+17	28	
7	Feroemail Ploiești	26	11	6	9	34	36	−2	28	
8	Voința Râmnicu Sărat	26	12	4	10	44	50	−6	28	
9	Victoria Florești	26	10	5	11	35	26	+9	25	
10	Rafinăria Câmpina	26	9	6	11	54	44	+10	24	
11	Muncitorul Schela Mare	26	8	4	14	29	55	−26	20	
12	Rapid Buzău	26	8	4	14	29	71	−42	20	
13	Petrolul Târgoviște	26	4	3	19	35	67	−32	11	
14	Foresta Nehoiu	26	4	2	20	20	88	−68	10	

Rules for classification: 1) points; 2) goal difference; 3) number of goals scored.
(C) Champions; (P) Promoted

=== Suceava Region ===
Pos	Team	Pld	W	D	L	GF	GA	GD	Pts	Qualification or relegation
1	Dinamo Suceava (C, P)	30	27	1	2	119	21	+98	55	Promotion to Divizia C
2	Unirea Botoșani (P)	30	22	6	2	95	22	+73	50	Promotion to Divizia C
3	Energia Moldovița	30	17	2	11	102	47	+55	36	
4	Avântul Frasin	30	14	6	10	69	69	0	34	
5	Moldova Rădăuți	30	13	6	11	86	80	+6	32	
6	Volanul Botoșani	30	11	7	12	53	60	−7	29	
7	Victoria Dorohoi	30	12	5	13	57	74	−17	29	
8	Minobrad Vatra Dornei	30	11	6	13	55	65	−10	28	
9	Feroviarul Câmpulung Moldovenesc	30	11	6	13	42	52	−10	28	
10	Filatura Fălticeni	30	11	5	14	78	60	+18	27	
11	Tractorul Săveni	30	11	4	15	58	73	−15	26	
12	CFR Suceava	30	9	6	15	63	69	−6	24	
13	Unirea Siret	30	10	4	16	56	66	−10	24	
14	Moldova Gura Humorului	30	8	6	16	39	64	−25	22	
15	Bradul Vama	30	8	2	20	36	119	−83	18	
16	Forestierul Falcău	30	2	12	16	35	101	−66	16	

Rules for classification: 1) points; 2) goal difference; 3) number of goals scored.
(C) Champions; (P) Promoted

== See also ==
- 1962–63 Divizia A
- 1962–63 Divizia B
- 1962–63 Cupa României
