= Ion Pârcălab =

Romanian footballer

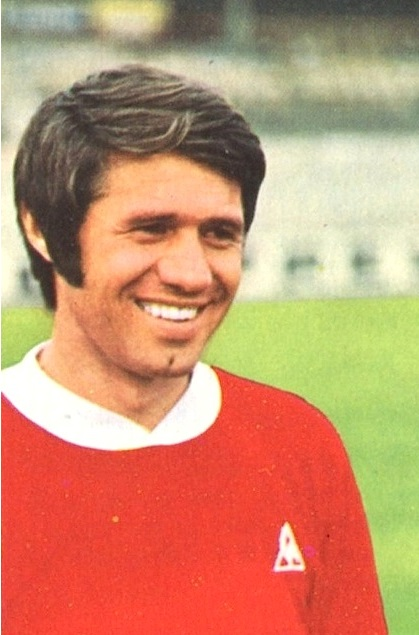
- Pârcălab with Nîmes Olympique c. 1973

Personal information
- Date of birth: 5 November 1941 (age 84)
- Place of birth: Bucharest, Romania
- Height: 1.72 m (5 ft 8 in)
- Positions: Forward; winger

Youth career
- Dinamo București
- UTA Arad

Senior career*
Years	Team	Apps	(Gls)
1958–1961	UTA Arad	38	(13)
1961–1970	Dinamo București	194	(53)
1970–1973	Nîmes	83	(20)
Total		315	(86)

International career
1961–1968	Romania (Note: Including 12 appearances and 2 goals for Romania's Olympic team)	38	(5)

Managerial career
- UTA Arad (assistant)
- Gloria Buzău
- Sportul Studențesc București (juniors)
- IMUM Medgidia
- 1980: Progresul Pucioasa
- Aversa București
- * Club domestic league appearances and goals

Ion Pârcălab (born 5 November 1941) is a Romanian former professional football player and manager.

== Club career ==
=== Early career ===
Pârcălab, nicknamed "The Carpathian Arrow", was born on 5 November 1941 in Bucharest, Romania and began playing junior-level football at local club Dinamo, working with coach Petre Steinbach. He was brought to UTA Arad by his stepbrother, Nicolae Dumitrescu, who was a junior coach there, and they won together the 1958–59 national junior championship after defeating Farul Constanța in the final. He started his senior career at UTA, making his Divizia A debut on 24 May 1959 under coach Coloman Braun-Bogdan in a 2–1 loss to Progresul București. In his last season spent with The Old Lady, Pârcălab scored 10 goals in the league.

=== Dinamo București ===
In 1961, Pârcălab joined Dinamo București where, during his first four seasons, he helped the club win four consecutive Divizia A titles from 1962 to 1965. In the first one he worked with three coaches, Traian Ionescu, Constantin Teașcă and Nicolae Dumitru, who gave him 24 appearances in which he scored seven goals. In the following two Dumitru and Ionescu used him in 21 matches in which he netted seven times in the first and in 25 games with 10 goals scored in the second. In the last one he played 20 matches, finding the net eight times under the guidance of Angelo Niculescu. Pârcălab also won two Cupa României trophies with The Red Dogs. In the 1964 final, coach Ionescu played him for the full 90 minutes, and he scored a goal in their 5–3 victory over rivals Steaua București, then in the 1968 final, coach Bazil Marian used him the entire match in the 3–1 win against Rapid București. He would score two more goals against Steaua, including one in a 2–0 victory.

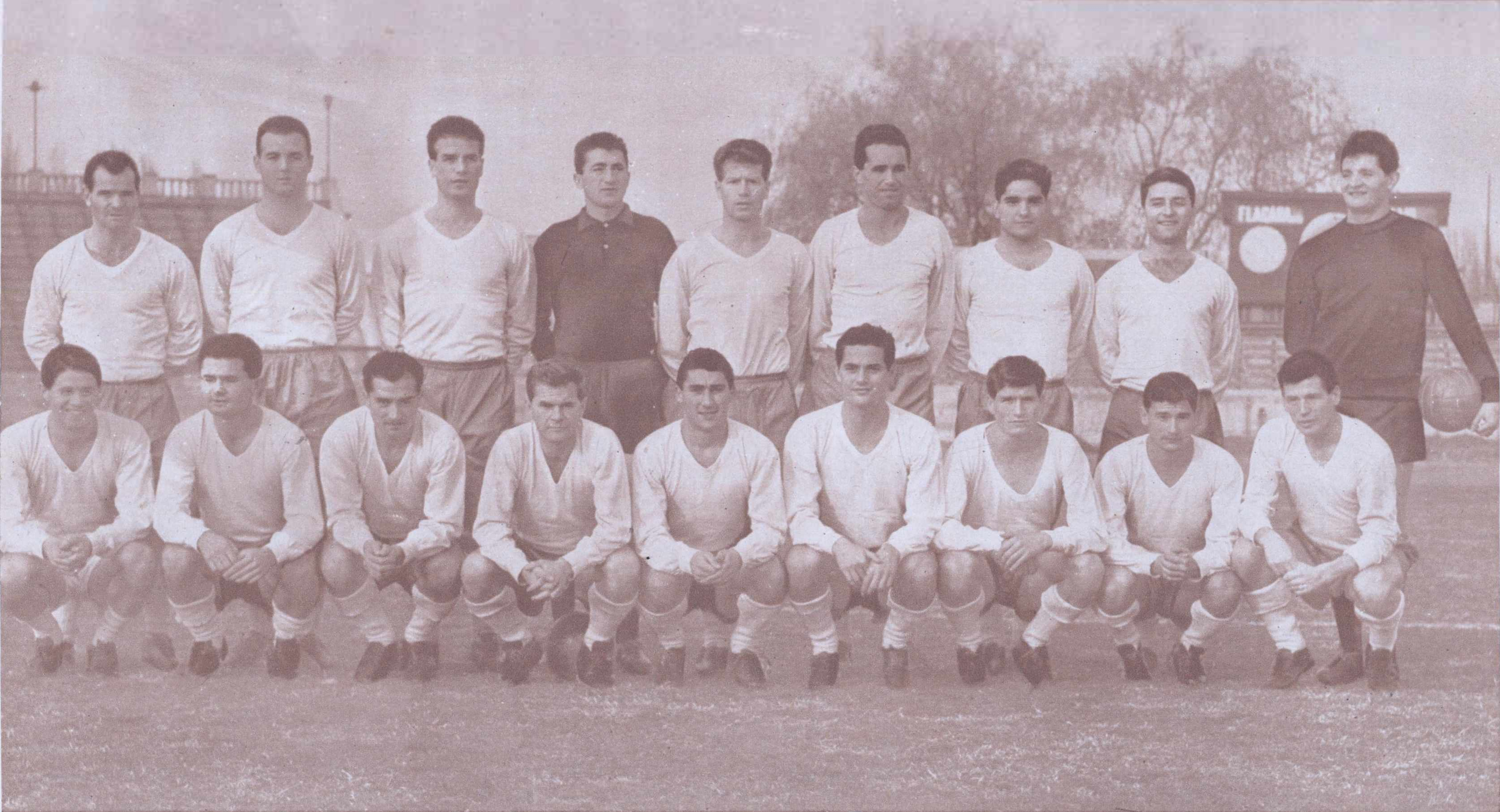
Pârcălab (first from the left, below) with Dinamo București in the 1963–64 season

In 1965, Pârcălab was awarded the title "Best Football Player" in Romania, and in 1966 he was ranked third for the first Romanian Footballer of the Year award. In the 1963–64 European Cup campaign, he played all four games as Dinamo got past East Germany champion, Motor Jena, being eliminated in the next phase by Real Madrid against whom he scored a goal in a 5–3 loss. In the 1965–66 European Cup edition he scored a goal that helped them eliminate Denmark's champion, Boldklubben 1909. Subsequently, they were eliminated by the winners of the previous two seasons of the competition, Inter Milan, but earned a historical 2–1 victory in the first leg, after which he said:"I am happy, very happy! This victory is primarily a lesson for us. We proved to ourselves that we can do much more".

Pârcălab's last Divizia A appearance took place on 19 July 1970, playing for Dinamo in a 1–1 draw against Politehnica Iași, totaling 232 matches with 66 goals in the competition.

=== Nîmes ===
"I remember epic evenings because Pârcălab was a crazy dribbler. He would dribble past his defender, stop, and the crowd would applaud and scream for him to dribble past him again."

— French journalist Jean-Jacques Bourdin.

During Romania's communist era, transfers of Romanian footballers outside the country were rarely allowed. However, in June 1970, dictator Nicolae Ceaușescu visited France, where he was invited by president Georges Pompidou. Pompidou took him to Nîmes, a town where communists consistently won elections. There, Ceaușescu spoke with the mayor, who complained about the poor results of the local football team, Nîmes Olympique. Consequently, Ceaușescu promised to send two Romanian footballers to the club. Subsequently, some French officials were dispatched to observe the 1970 Cupa României final, which Steaua București won 2–1 against Dinamo București. From this match, they selected Florea Voinea from Steaua and Pârcălab from Dinamo to play for Nîmes.

Pârcălab made his French Division 1 debut on 26 September 1970 under coach Kader Firoud in a 4–2 away loss to Metz. He scored his first goal on 31 October in a 2–1 loss to Red Star and by the end of the season he netted a brace in a 5–3 win over Saint-Étienne. In the following season he scored a hat-trick in a 5–2 home victory against Lille. Pârcălab and compatriot Voinea finished the 1971–72 season with each scoring 11 goals, which helped the team finish second in the championship. He made his last French Division 1 appearance on 11 February 1973 in a 1–1 draw against Red Star, totaling 80 matches with 20 goals in the competition. Pârcălab also played for Nîmes in four UEFA Cup matches, having a total of 20 games with five goals in European competitions.

== International career ==
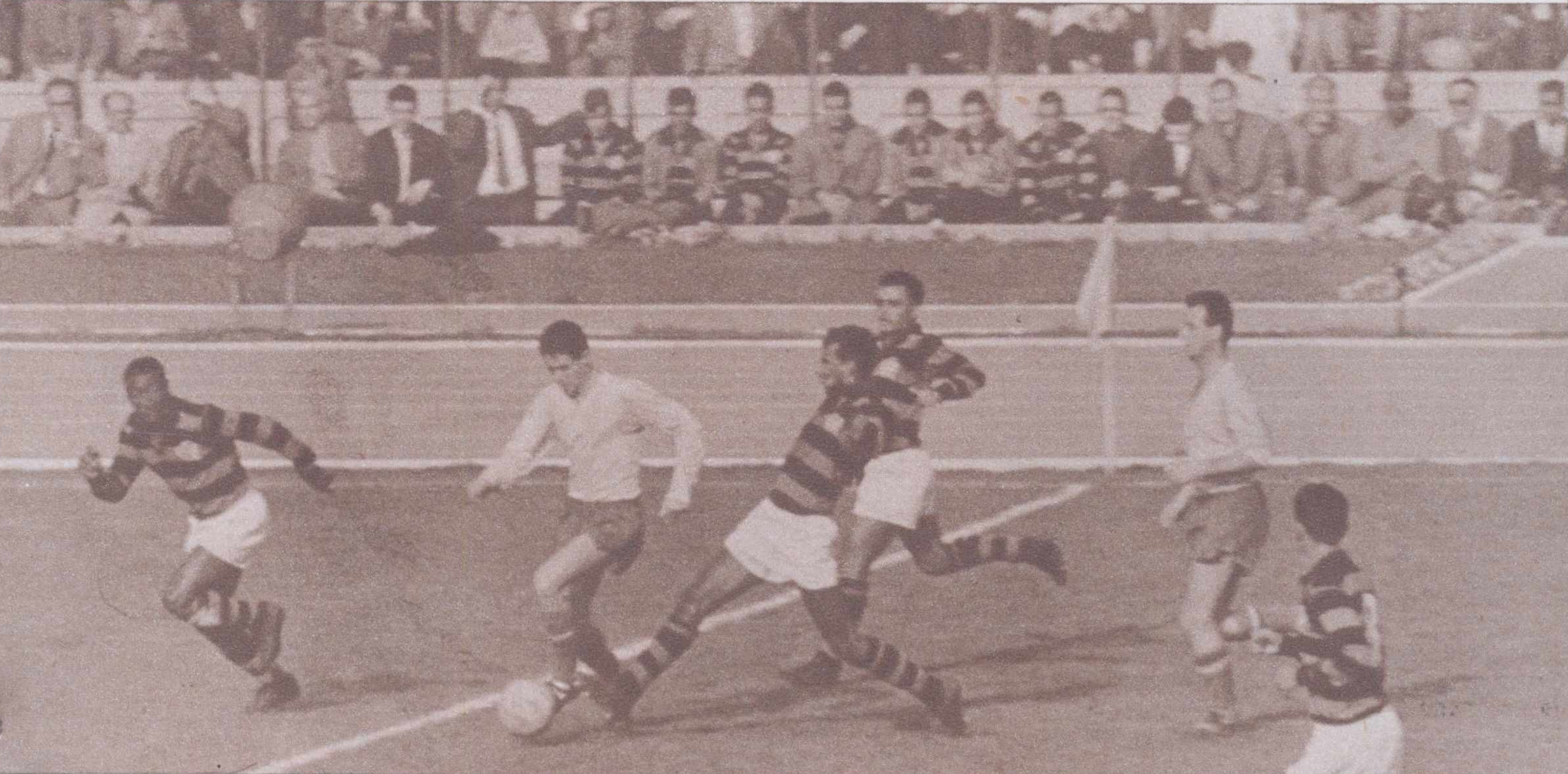
Pârcălab dribbles past three Flamengo players during an international friendly between Romania's Olympic team and Flamengo of Brazil which Romania won 2–1 in 1963.

Pârcălab played 26 games and scored three goals for Romania, making his debut on 8 October 1961 under coach Gheorghe Popescu in a 4–0 friendly victory against Turkey. His following game was a 3–1 win over Spain in the 1964 European Nations' Cup qualifiers. Pârcălab scored his first goal for the national team in a friendly which ended with a 3–2 victory against East Germany. He played six matches and scored one goal in a 2–0 victory against Eusébio's Portugal during the 1966 World Cup qualifiers. Pârcălab scored his last goal for The Tricolours in a 2–1 friendly success over Israel. He made four appearances in the Euro 1968 qualifiers and one in the 1970 World Cup qualifiers.

Pârcălab also played 12 games for Romania's Olympic team, being chosen by coach Silviu Ploeșteanu to be part of the 1964 Summer Olympics squad in Tokyo where he scored two goals, one in a 3–1 victory against Mexico and one in a 3–0 win over Yugoslavia, helping the team finish in fifth place.

=== International goals ===
Scores and results list Romania's goal tally first, score column indicates score after each Pârcălab goal.

Goal	Date	Venue	Opponent	Score	Result	Competition
1	12 May 1963	23 August Stadium, București, Romania	East Germany	2–1	3–2	Friendly
2	21 November 1965	23 August Stadium, București, Romania	Portugal	1–0	2–0	1966 World Cup qualifiers
3	7 December 1966	Bloomfield Stadium, Tel Aviv, Israel	Israel	2–1	2–1	Friendly

== Controversy and conviction ==
In 1980, Pârcălab was coach at Progresul Pucioasa in the third division. After a victory in the championship, he took his players to celebrate in a restaurant, but after a few drinks, a conflict between him and the goalkeeper Nicolae Stancu started because of a waitress. They went to the bathroom to solve their problem, and it is assumed that there Pârcălab killed Stancu by introducing a broomstick in his throat or by hitting him in the back of his head. He was sentenced to three years in prison, but got released after two. In the early 2000s, Pârcălab claimed he was innocent and that he was wrongfully convicted.

== Personal life ==
Pârcălab's stepbrother, Nicolae Dumitrescu, was also an international footballer and a manager.

== Honours ==
Dinamo București

- Divizia A: 1961–62, 1962–63, 1963–64, 1964–65
- Cupa României: 1963–64, 1967–68

Nîmes

- French Division 1 runner-up: 1971–72
- Coppa delle Alpi: 1972

Individual

- Romanian Best Football Player: 1965
- Romanian Footballer of the Year third place: 1966
