= CFR Arad =

Romanian football club

- Full name: CFR Arad
- Nicknames: Ceferiștii (The CFR People); Feroviarii (The Railwaymen); Arădenii (The Arad People)
- Short name: CFR
- Founded: 1921
- Dissolved: 1999
- Ground: CFR Stadium
Home colours	Away colours

Club Sportiv CFR Arad, commonly known as CFR Arad was a Romanian football club based in Arad. Founded in 1921, the club underwent several mergers and name changes throughout its history. In 1922, it merged with Gloria Arad to form Gloria CFR Arad, a team that went on to achieve notable success, including reaching the final of the 1929–30 National Championship season. However, in 1934, the two clubs separated and continued as independent entities.

After the split, CFR Arad mostly competed in the second and third tiers of Romanian football, managing to reach the quarter-finals of the Cupa României in both the 1940–41 and 1950 seasons.

== History ==
CFR Arad was founded in 1921. and, just one year later, merged with Gloria Arad, a club established in 1913, which, under the name Gloria CFR Arad, achieved its best performances by reaching the final of National Championship in the 1929–30 season. However, in 1934, after twelve years, the club split into Gloria Arad and CFR Arad. Following the separation, CFR returned to competing in the regional championships, while Gloria Arad experienced its peak years in the Romanian top flight.

CFR Arad earned promotion to Divizia B at the end of the 1939–40 season. Renamed Crișana CFR Arad, it competed in Series I during the 1940–41 season, finishing 8th, and reached the quarter-finals of the Cupa României, where it was eliminated by Venus București 0–3. Football activity was suspended during World War II, and after competitions resumed, CFR was assigned again to Divizia B, finishing 6th in Series I in the 1946–47 season, 5th in Series III in 1947–48, and 7th in Series II in 1948–49.

In 1950, the club was renamed Locomotiva Arad and continued in Series II of the second division, finishing 10th and reaching the quarterfinals of the Cupa României, where it lost 0–1 to Locomotiva Sibiu. In 1951 it narrowly avoided relegation on goal difference, ending in 10th place, tied on points with Minerul Lupeni, and reached the Round of 32 in the Cupa României, losing 1–4 to Flamura Roșie Arad.

The 1952 season brought a strong campaign, ending with a 3rd-place finish and a Cupa României that ended in the Round of 16, after a 0–1 loss in extra time to Progresul Oradea. In 1953, CFR ranked 6th, and in 1954, it finished 8th while also qualifying for Cupa României's Round of 32, where it was again eliminated by Flamura Roșie Arad, this time with a 0–1 defeat. In 1955, CFR ended the season in 5th place. The following year, it was moved to Series I and once again finished 5th. The Railwaymen reached the Round of 32 in the Cupa României, where they lost 2–5 to Locomotiva Timișoara. The lineup comprised Bătrîn — Florescu, Popescu, Meszaroș — Tudoroiu, Blaj — Bacoș, Don, Ioanovici, Stan, and Tomescu.

In 1957, the club reverted to the name CFR Arad and finished the 1957–58 season in 8th place, followed by a 6th-place finish in 1958–59. At the end of the 1959–60 campaign, the Railwaymen were relegated to the regional championship after finishing 13th in Series III. CFR Arad quickly bounced back, winning Series I of the Banat Regional Championship in the following season and defeating Metalul Oțelu Roșu (0–1 away and 2–0 at home) in the championship final. It then topped the promotion play-off series held in Sibiu, returning to Divizia B.

In the 1961–62 season, CFR competed in Series III of Divizia B and finished 10th. The following year, now renamed CFR–IRTA Arad, and coached by Francisc Dvorszak, the team finished last in its series and was relegated to the newly re-established Divizia C. Assigned to the West Series, CFR finished 5th in the 1963–64 season and claimed 1st place under Dvorszak in 1964–65, earning promotion once more.

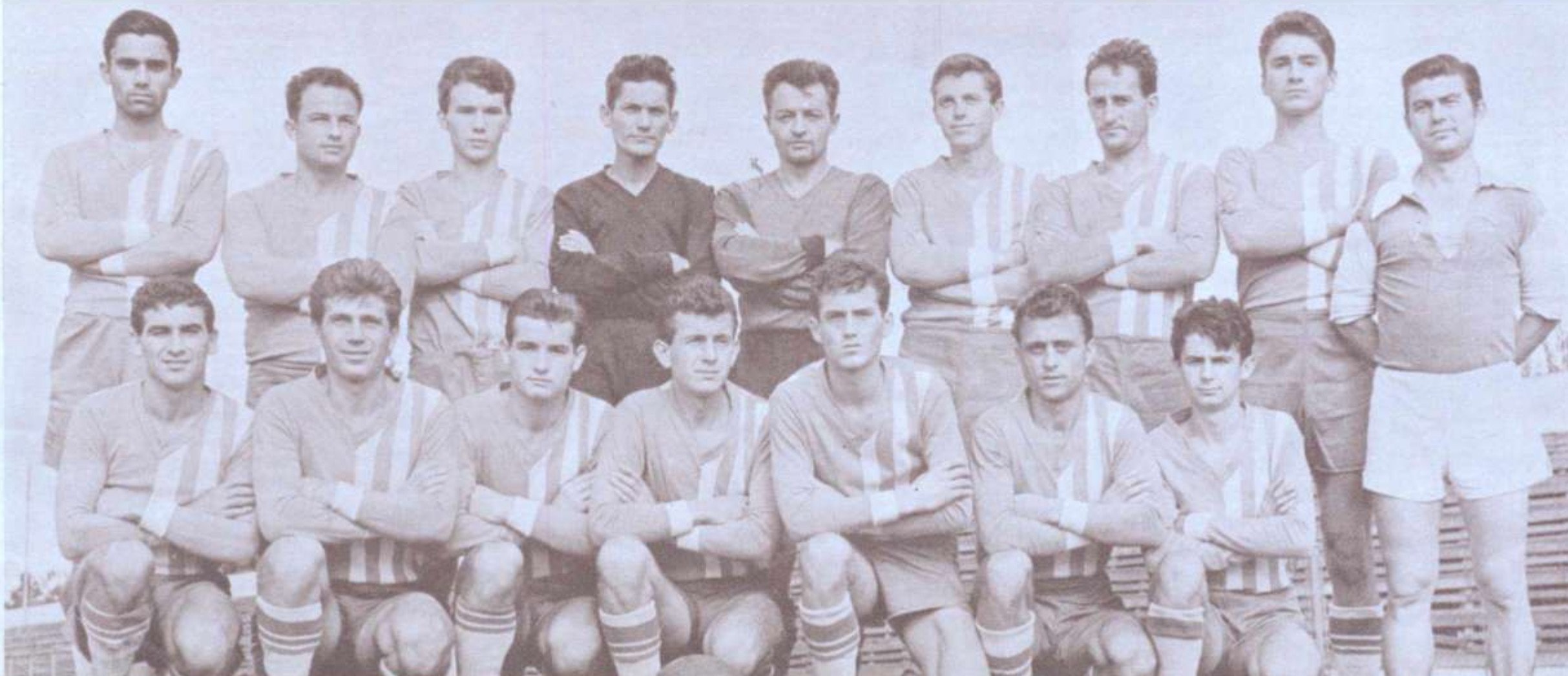
CFR Arad in the 1966–67 season.

In Divizia B, Arădenii competed in Series II and finished 10th in the 1965–66 season, 12th in 1966–67, 7th in 1967–68, 5th in 1968–69, 14th in 1969–70, and 9th in 1970–71, a season in which they also reached the Round of 32 in the Cupa României, losing 0–3 to FC Argeș with the lineup Wesser, Cotarcă (60' Kukla), Bermozer, Alexandru, Cociuban, Gligor, Vlad, Beșcuca, Gyenge, Butaș (46' Körösi), Czako I. In 1971–72, CFR finished 4th, followed by a disappointing 14th-place finish in the 1972–73 season.

In 1973, the club merged once again, this time with Vagonul Arad, competing under the names Unirea Arad and Rapid Arad until 1978. That year, CFR Arad split off again, merged with Constructorul Arad, was renamed CFR Constructorul Arad, and took over its place in Divizia C, competing in Series IX and finishing in 7th place during the 1978–79 season.

In 1979, the club dropped the Constructorul name, reverted to its original CFR Arad, and continued to compete in the third division under head coach Antoniu Bacoș, ranking 4th in Series IX in the 1979–80 season. The Railwaymen went on to place 7th in Series VIII in 1980–81 and finish as runners-up in Series IX in 1981–82. Between 1982 and 1984, the team was coached by Silviu Iorgulescu, placing 9th in Series VIII in 1982–83 and 13th in Series IX in 1983–84, before being relegated at the end of the 1984–85 season after finishing last in Series VIII.

CFR won the 1985–86 Arad County Championship but lost the promotion play-off against Târnavele Blaj, suffering a two-legged defeat (1–3 away, 0–2 at home). The lineup included Buruian, Bășcărău, Kimak, Roșca, Bagosi (Schwartzkopf), Nicolovici (Cohan), Bădin, Caracioni, Melnic, Găman, and Pătroi.

In the following seasons, they finished as runners-up in 1986–87 and 1988–89, and won the county title in 1989–90 season, earning promotion to Divizia C after a play-off against the Timiș County champions, Electromotor Timișoara (3–0 at home and 0–2 away). The squad consisted of Huțan – Barb, Tamaș, Moț, Dănăilă, Bran, Caracioni (Mărușter), Sziklar, Viszhanyo (Drida), Seviciu, and Anghel. However, the Railwaymen lasted only one season in the third tier, finishing last in Series XII and being relegated back to the fourth division. After finishing 3rd in Series A of the Arad County Championship, the club was relegated to the fifth tier at the end of the 1994–95 season.

== Honours ==
Divizia C

- Winners (1): 1964–65
- Runners-up (1): 1981–82

Liga IV – Arad County

- Winners (2): 1985–86, 1989–90
- Runners-up (2): 1986–87, 1988–89

Banat Regional Championship

- Winners (1): 1960–61

== Former managers ==
- (Romania) Ioan Reinhardt (1953–1956)
- (Romania) Francisc Dvorszak (1962–1965)
- (Romania) Silviu Iorgulescu (1982–1984)
- (Romania) Ilie Don
- (Romania) Antoniu Bacoș
