= 1962–63 Divizia A =

45th season of top-tier football league in Romania

Divizia A
- Season: 1962–63
- Champions: Dinamo București
- Top goalscorer: Ion Ionescu (20)

The 1962–63 Divizia A was the forty-fifth season of Divizia A, the top-level football league of Romania.

== Teams ==
Location of teams in 1962-63 Divizia A

== League table ==
| Pos | Team | Pld | W | D | L | GF | GA | GD | Pts | Qualification or relegation |
|---|---|---|---|---|---|---|---|---|---|---|
| 1 | Dinamo București (C) | 27 | 14 | 9 | 4 | 46 | 25 | +21 | 37 | Qualification to European Cup first round |
| 2 | Steaua București | 27 | 13 | 8 | 6 | 58 | 42 | +16 | 34 | |
| 3 | Știința Timișoara | 27 | 11 | 7 | 9 | 41 | 39 | +2 | 29 | |
| 4 | Știința Cluj | 27 | 11 | 7 | 9 | 42 | 44 | −2 | 29 | |
| 5 | Farul Constanța | 27 | 12 | 4 | 11 | 48 | 38 | +10 | 28 | |
| 6 | Steagul Roşu Brașov | 27 | 12 | 4 | 11 | 48 | 44 | +4 | 28 | Invitation to Inter-Cities Fairs Cup first round |
| 7 | Petrolul Ploiești | 27 | 10 | 7 | 10 | 46 | 30 | +16 | 27 | Qualification to Cup Winners' Cup first round |
| 8 | Rapid București | 27 | 10 | 7 | 10 | 52 | 46 | +6 | 27 | Invitation to Balkans Cup |
| 9 | Progresul București | 27 | 10 | 7 | 10 | 45 | 49 | −4 | 27 | |
| 10 | CSMS Iași | 27 | 8 | 10 | 9 | 44 | 53 | −9 | 26 | |
| 11 | UTA Arad | 27 | 10 | 5 | 12 | 47 | 49 | −2 | 25 | |
| 12 | Dinamo Bacău (R) | 27 | 9 | 5 | 13 | 32 | 42 | −10 | 23 | Relegation to Divizia B |
| 13 | Crișana Oradea (R) | 27 | 9 | 5 | 13 | 34 | 47 | −13 | 23 | Relegation to Divizia B |
| 14 | Viitorul București | 14 | 6 | 3 | 5 | 33 | 26 | +7 | 15 | Dissolved after the first part of the season. (Note: Viitorul București was dissolved after the first part of the season.) |
| 15 | Minerul Lupeni (R) | 27 | 4 | 6 | 17 | 24 | 66 | −42 | 14 | Relegation to Divizia B |

Source: LT
Rules for classification: 1) points; 2) goal average; 3) number of goals scored
(C) Champions; (R) Relegated

=== Results ===
| Home \ Away | IAȘ | CRI | BAC | DIN | FAR | MIN | PET | PRO | RAP | SRB | STE | UTA | VIB | ȘCJ | ȘTI |
|---|---|---|---|---|---|---|---|---|---|---|---|---|---|---|---|
| CSMS Iași | — | 3–0 | 3–2 | 2–2 | 2–2 | 3–0 | 1–1 | 1–2 | 1–1 | 2–0 | 1–1 | 3–0 | 2–2 | 2–1 | 3–1 |
| Crișana Oradea | 0–0 | — | 0–1 | 1–3 | 0–1 | 4–0 | 2–0 | 2–1 | 4–2 | 1–0 | 1–0 | 4–3 | 3–2 | 4–0 | 1–1 |
| Dinamo Bacău | 3–0 | 1–1 | — | 0–0 | 3–1 | 3–0 | 0–0 | 3–4 | 1–0 | 1–1 | 2–3 | 2–0 | 1–2 | 0–0 | 3–0 |
| Dinamo București | 6–1 | 4–0 | 1–0 | — | 0–0 | 4–2 | 2–1 | 3–2 | 1–1 | 4–0 | 2–2 | 4–2 | — | 0–0 | 0–1 |
| Farul Constanța | 3–1 | 1–0 | 4–1 | 0–1 | — | 5–1 | 2–0 | 4–0 | 4–2 | 1–1 | 1–0 | 1–1 | — | 4–2 | 3–0 |
| Minerul Lupeni | 2–1 | 4–0 | 0–1 | 1–2 | 1–0 | — | 1–1 | 0–0 | 0–0 | 3–0 | 1–1 | 0–0 | — | 1–3 | 0–0 |
| Petrolul Ploiești | 1–1 | 8–1 | 4–0 | 0–1 | 1–0 | 4–0 | — | 4–0 | 3–2 | 0–0 | 4–0 | 4–0 | 3–0 | 0–0 | 5–1 |
| Progresul București | 3–3 | 1–0 | 2–0 | 0–0 | 0–3 | 2–1 | 0–0 | — | 2–1 | 4–3 | 2–2 | 2–1 | — | 6–3 | 0–0 |
| Rapid București | 4–1 | 1–0 | 5–1 | 2–1 | 1–0 | 5–2 | 6–1 | 3–2 | — | 2–1 | 0–2 | 3–4 | 1–3 | 1–0 | 1–1 |
| Steagul Roşu Brașov | 2–1 | 1–1 | 1–2 | 3–0 | 4–2 | 8–0 | 2–0 | 2–0 | 2–1 | — | 3–2 | 2–0 | — | 4–2 | 3–1 |
| Steaua București | 2–2 | 4–2 | 2–0 | 0–0 | 5–4 | 3–2 | 3–1 | 3–1 | 3–3 | 0–1 | — | 4–1 | 4–2 | 4–1 | 5–3 |
| UTA Arad | 2–3 | 3–1 | 3–1 | 0–1 | 4–0 | 3–1 | 2–0 | 1–1 | 2–0 | 3–1 | 0–2 | — | 2–2 | 5–0 | 3–2 |
| Viitorul București | — | — | — | 1–0 | 3–1 | 7–0 | — | 1–5 | — | 7–1 | — | — | — | 0–0 | 1–3 |
| Știința Cluj | 6–0 | 1–0 | 2–0 | 3–3 | 1–0 | 2–1 | 1–0 | 3–2 | 2–2 | 2–1 | 1–1 | 4–1 | — | — | 2–1 |
| Știința Timișoara | 4–1 | 1–1 | 3–0 | 0–1 | 3–1 | 4–0 | 2–0 | 2–1 | 2–2 | 2–1 | 1–0 | 1–1 | — | 1–0 | — |

Source: LT (in Romanian)
Legend: Blue = home team win; Yellow = draw; Red = away team win.

== Top goalscorers ==
| Rank | Player | Club | Goals |
|---|---|---|---|
| 1 | Ion Ionescu | Rapid București | 20 |
| 2 | Mihai Adam | Știința Cluj | 15 |
| 2 | Cicerone Manolache | Știința Timișoara | 15 |
| 2 | Florea Voinea | Steaua București | 15 |
| 5 | Mihai Țârlea | UTA Arad | 14 |

== Champion squad ==
Dinamo București

Goalkeepers: Iuliu Uțu (17 / 0); Ilie Datcu (13 / 0).
Defenders: Cornel Popa (25 / 0); Ion Nunweiller (18 / 0); Dumitru Ivan (25 / 1); Ilie Constantinescu (8 / 0).
Midfielders: Vasile Alexandru (13 / 1); Lică Nunweiller (22 / 1); Constantin Ștefan (25 / 0).
Forwards: Ion Pîrcălab (21 / 7); Constantin Frățilă (15 / 9); Iosif Varga (22 / 4); Aurel Unguroiu (20 / 3); Gheorghe Ene (19 / 7); Ion Țîrcovnicu (24 / 7); Vasile Anghel (3 / 0); Haralambie Eftimie (5 / 3); Nicolae Niculescu (2 / 0); Constantin David (12 / 1); Nicolae Selymes (8 / 2); Vasile Gergely (1 / 0).
(league appearances and goals listed in brackets)

Manager: Nicolae Dumitru / Traian Ionescu.

== See also ==
- 1962–63 Divizia B
