= 1963–64 Divizia A =

46th season of top-tier football league in Romania

Divizia A
- Season: 1963–64
- Champions: Dinamo București
- Top goalscorer: Constantin Frățilă, Cornel Pavlovici (19)

The 1963–64 Divizia A was the forty-sixth season of Divizia A, the top-level football league of Romania.

== Teams ==
Location of teams in 1963-64 Divizia A

== League table ==
| Pos | Team | Pld | W | D | L | GF | GA | GD | Pts | Qualification or relegation |
|---|---|---|---|---|---|---|---|---|---|---|
| 1 | Dinamo București (C) | 26 | 18 | 4 | 4 | 65 | 25 | +40 | 40 | Qualification to European Cup first round |
| 2 | Rapid București | 26 | 15 | 3 | 8 | 50 | 36 | +14 | 33 | |
| 3 | FC Steaua București | 26 | 15 | 1 | 10 | 71 | 44 | +27 | 31 | Qualification to Cup Winners' Cup first round |
| 4 | Progresul București | 26 | 11 | 5 | 10 | 40 | 45 | −5 | 27 | |
| 5 | Petrolul Ploiești | 26 | 11 | 4 | 11 | 28 | 19 | +9 | 26 | Invitation to Inter-Cities Fairs Cup first round |
| 6 | Steagul Roşu Brașov | 26 | 9 | 8 | 9 | 32 | 32 | 0 | 26 | |
| 7 | Crişul Oradea | 26 | 10 | 6 | 10 | 27 | 38 | −11 | 26 | |
| 8 | Farul Constanța | 26 | 11 | 3 | 12 | 28 | 34 | −6 | 25 | |
| 9 | Știința Cluj | 26 | 11 | 2 | 13 | 39 | 38 | +1 | 24 | |
| 10 | Dinamo Pitești | 26 | 10 | 3 | 13 | 28 | 39 | −11 | 23 | |
| 11 | UTA Arad | 26 | 9 | 5 | 12 | 32 | 46 | −14 | 23 | |
| 12 | CSMS Iași | 26 | 10 | 2 | 14 | 42 | 47 | −5 | 22 | |
| 13 | Știința Timișoara (R) | 26 | 8 | 6 | 12 | 31 | 42 | −11 | 22 | Relegation to Divizia B |
| 14 | Siderurgistul Galați (R) | 26 | 6 | 4 | 16 | 21 | 49 | −28 | 16 | Relegation to Divizia B |

Source: LT
Rules for classification: 1) points; 2) goal average; 3) number of goals scored
(C) Champions; (R) Relegated

=== Results ===
| Home \ Away | IAȘ | CRI | DIN | PIT | FAR | PET | PRO | RAP | SID | SRB | STE | UTA | ȘCJ | ȘTI |
|---|---|---|---|---|---|---|---|---|---|---|---|---|---|---|
| CSMS Iași | — | 6–0 | 1–5 | 2–1 | 2–1 | 1–0 | 2–0 | 0–0 | 1–0 | 2–3 | 2–1 | 5–1 | 4–0 | 3–0 |
| Crișul Oradea | 2–1 | — | 1–1 | 0–0 | 0–1 | 0–0 | 1–0 | 1–1 | 3–1 | 2–0 | 1–3 | 1–0 | 1–0 | 1–0 |
| Dinamo București | 2–1 | 1–1 | — | 2–0 | 7–0 | 1–0 | 2–3 | 5–2 | 5–1 | 6–2 | 3–2 | 6–0 | 2–1 | 0–0 |
| Dinamo Pitești | 2–0 | 1–0 | 0–4 | — | 2–1 | 2–0 | 3–2 | 0–1 | 2–1 | 2–0 | 0–1 | 3–0 | 2–1 | 1–0 |
| Farul Constanța | 2–0 | 0–1 | 0–2 | 2–1 | — | 0–1 | 2–0 | 3–1 | 2–0 | 2–2 | 2–1 | 0–0 | 1–0 | 4–0 |
| Petrolul Ploiești | 2–1 | 3–1 | 0–1 | 0–0 | 1–0 | — | 2–2 | 0–1 | 4–0 | 1–0 | 2–1 | 1–0 | 1–0 | 3–0 |
| Progresul București | 5–3 | 2–1 | 0–2 | 3–2 | 1–0 | 1–0 | — | 2–2 | 2–3 | 1–1 | 2–1 | 1–3 | 3–1 | 3–1 |
| Rapid București | 3–1 | 1–0 | 0–2 | 2–0 | 3–0 | 0–6 | 5–0 | — | 3–1 | 4–1 | 3–4 | 3–1 | 1–2 | 4–0 |
| Siderurgistul Galați | 3–1 | 0–3 | 0–1 | 0–0 | 1–0 | 0–0 | 1–2 | 1–0 | — | 0–0 | 1–2 | 2–0 | 1–1 | 0–1 |
| Steagul Roşu Brașov | 1–1 | 5–0 | 1–0 | 2–0 | 0–1 | 2–0 | 0–0 | 1–2 | 5–0 | — | 0–1 | 1–1 | 2–0 | 0–0 |
| Steaua București | 5–1 | 7–2 | 4–1 | 6–3 | 1–2 | 1–0 | 1–2 | 0–2 | 5–2 | 5–0 | — | 7–0 | 4–1 | 3–2 |
| UTA Arad | 2–0 | 2–3 | 2–3 | 1–0 | 2–0 | 2–1 | 1–1 | 0–1 | 3–1 | 0–0 | 4–0 | — | 2–0 | 2–1 |
| Știința Cluj | 4–1 | 1–0 | 2–0 | 5–1 | 3–0 | 1–0 | 3–2 | 3–1 | 0–1 | 0–1 | 4–4 | 2–0 | — | 3–0 |
| Știința Timișoara | 2–0 | 1–1 | 1–1 | 3–0 | 2–2 | 1–0 | 2–0 | 2–4 | 3–0 | 1–2 | 2–1 | 3–3 | 3–1 | — |

Source: LT (in Romanian)
Legend: Blue = home team win; Yellow = draw; Red = away team win.

== Top goalscorers ==
| Rank | Player | Club | Goals |
|---|---|---|---|
| 1 | Constantin Frățilă | Dinamo București | 19 |
| 1 | Cornel Pavlovici | Steaua București | 19 |
| 3 | Florea Voinea | Steaua București | 16 |
| 3 | Mihai Țârlea | UTA Arad | 16 |
| 5 | Ion Ionescu | Rapid București | 15 |

== Champion squad ==
Dinamo București

Goalkeepers: Ilie Datcu (26 / 0); Iuliu Uțu (2 / 0).
Defenders: Cornel Popa (24 / 0); Ion Nunweiller (26 / 0); Dumitru Ivan (19 / 0); Constantin Ștefan (19 / 0); Ilie Constantinescu (1 / 0).
Midfielders: Emil Petru (23 / 8); Lică Nunweiller (26 / 1); Octavian Popescu (11 / 3).
Forwards: Ion Pîrcălab (25 / 10); Iosif Varga (8 / 0); Gheorghe Ene (14 / 5); Constantin Frățilă (26 / 19); Ion Haidu (21 / 6); Aurel Unguroiu (8 / 5); Ion Țîrcovnicu (17 / 5); Radu Nunweiller (5 / 2); Vasile Gergely (3 / 0); Mircea Lucescu (2 / 0).
(league appearances and goals listed in brackets)

Manager: Traian Ionescu & Nicolae Dumitru.

== See also ==
- 1963–64 Divizia B
- 1963–64 Divizia C
- 1963–64 Regional Championship
