= ACS Victoria Tecuci =

Romanian football club

Victoria Tecuci
- Full name: Asociația Club Sportiv Victoria Tecuci
- Nicknames: Tecucenii (The Tecuci People)
- Short name: Victoria
- Founded: 1954 as Voința Tecuci; 1959 as Dinamo Tecuci; 2000 as FC Sporting Tecuci; 2018 as Victoria Tecuci
- Ground: Municipal
- Capacity: 1,000
- Owner: Tecuci Municipality
- League: Liga IV
- 2019–20: Liga IV, Galați County, 7th
Home colours	Away colours

Asociația Club Sportiv Victoria Tecuci, commonly known as Victoria Tecuci, is a Romanian football club based in Tecuci, Galați County. The club was created in 1954.

== History ==
The first football match in Tecuci was played in 1926, that match also being the first match played under the floodlights and was played between Armata Tecuci and Armata București.

Victoria Tecuci was founded under the name Voința Tecuci in 1954 and was the first football team from Tecuci that has ever played in a national competition.

In 1956, the team promoted to Divizia C, but two years later was moved to Buzău and dissolved. Than in 1959 the club was refounded as Dinamo Tecuci and the team managed to reach the Round of 16 in the Romanian Cup, where it was defeated by Metalul Titanii București with the score of 1–8.

In the 1961–62 season, Flamura Roșie won the Galați Regional Championship and promoted to the second division after finishing 2nd in the Series I of the promotion play-off.

In that season they relegated to Divizia C. Tecucenii played at Divizia C until 1967 when the team relegated once again, this time back to Divizia D.

It promoted in 1968 to Divizia C and one year later the club changed its name to Muncitorul Tecuci. Than in 1971, the club changed its name again into Uzina Reparații Auto (URA) Tecuci.

In 1975, the team took the place of Constructorul Galați in Divizia B, and relegated back to Divizia C only in 1982. Than the team played at that level until 1989 when relegated to Divizia D, but promoted back after one year and changed its name again, this time in Metalurgistul Tecuci.

In 1980, Victoria benefited again from a political decision, replacing Otelul Galati immediately after the promotion of the team in the second league. This has been the third and last time when a club from Galati, the county capital is relocated to Tecuci after a political decision. Some of the players moved along with the team to Tecuci and the others signing with Divizia C side Metalosport Galați.

In 1993, the team was taken by a militar unity from Tecuci and changed its name into Arsenal Tecuci. The team was dissolved three years later and was inactive until 2000 when was refounded as FC Sporting Tecuci, with two owners who were leading the club, Tecuci Municipality and businessman, Nicolae Prună.

In 2006, Sporting lost the promotion play-off to Liga III against Viitorul Însurăței from Brăila County, with the score of 0–3. In 2008, the team reached the promotion play-off to Liga III, this time Tecucenii lost against Săgeata Stejaru, 1–4. After that loss, the team was taken by Clubul Sportiv Școlar Tecuci and changed its name. The mayor was changed in Tecuci in 2012 and the team was again taken by the Tecuci Municipality and it came back to the name of Sporting Tecuci.

The colours of the club are white and blue.

== Chronology of names ==
Name	Period
Voința Tecuci	1954–1958
Dinamo Tecuci	1959–1961
Flamura Roșie Tecuci	1961–1969
Muncitorul Tecuci	1969–1971
URA Tecuci	1971–1975
Victoria Tecuci	1975–1990
Metalurgistul Tecuci	1990–1993
Arsenal Tecuci	1993–1996
FC Sporting Tecuci	2000–2008
CS Școlar Tecuci	2008–2012
CS Sporting Tecuci	2012–2017
Victoria Tecuci	2018–2021

- Note: 1 year of inactivity between 1958 and 1959, and the team was refounded as Dinamo Tecuci in the Liga IV.
- Note: 4 years of inactivity between 1996 and 2000, and the team was refounded as FC Sporting Tecuci in the Liga IV.
- Note: 1 year of inactivity between 2017 and 2018, and the team was refounded as Victoria Tecuci in the Liga IV.

== Stadium ==
The club plays its home matches on Stadionul Municipal from Tecuci, with a capacity of 1,000 seats. The stadium was officially opened in September 1950 and became the most important place where rugby and football competitions would take place.

== Honours ==
Liga III

- Runners-up (1): 1963–64

Liga IV – Galați County

- Winners (4): 1974–75, 1989–90, 2005–06, 2007–08
- Runners-up (1): 2002–03

Galați Regional Championship

- Winners (2): 1955–56, 1967–68

=== Other performances ===
- 6 seasons in Liga II
- 24 seasons in Liga III
- Cupa României Rounds of 16:

== Former managers ==
- (Romania) Vasile Stancu (1976–1978)
- (Romania) Vasile Stancu (1983–1984)
