= 1963–64 Cupa României =

Tournament details
- Country: Romania

Final positions
- Champions: Dinamo București
- Runners-up: Steaua București

The 1963–64 Cupa României was the 26th edition of Romania's most prestigious football cup competition.

The title was won by Dinamo București against Steaua București.

== Format ==
The competition is an annual knockout tournament.

In the first round proper, two pots were made, first pot with Divizia A teams and other teams till 16 and the second pot with the rest of teams qualified in this phase. Each tie is played as a single leg.

First round proper matches are played on the ground of the lowest ranked team, then from the second round proper the matches are played on a neutral location.

In the first round proper, if a match is drawn after 90 minutes, the game goes in extra time, and if the scored is still tight after 120 minutes, the team who played away will qualify.

From the second round proper, if a match is drawn after 90 minutes, the game goes in extra time, and if the scored is still tight after 120 minutes, then a replay will be played. In case the game is still tight after the replay, then the team from lower division will qualify for the next round.

From the first edition, the teams from Divizia A entered in competition in sixteen finals, rule which remained till today.

== First round proper ==
Team 1	Score	Team 2
1 March 1964
AS Aiud (Div. C)	3–1 (a.e.t.)	(Div. B) Știința Galați
Minerul Baia Mare (Div. B)	1–0	(Div. A) Siderurgistul Galați
CIL Blaj (Div. C)	1–0 (a.e.t.)	(Div. A) Petrolul Ploiești
Dinamo Victoria București (Div. C)	1–2	(Div. A) Știința Timișoara
Flacăra Roșie București (Div. C)	1–0 (a.e.t.)	(Div. A) Progresul București
Răsăritul Caracal (Div. C)	2–3	(Div. A) Farul Constanța
Recolta Carei (Div. C)	0–4	(Div. A) Rapid București
Ancora Galați (Div. C)	0–4	(Div. A) ASA Crișul Oradea
Victoria Giurgiu (Div. C)	1–3	(Div. A) Dinamo București
Textila Sfântu Gheorghe (Div. C)	2–1	(Div. A) Steagul Roșu Brașov
CSM Sibiu (Div. B)	3–1	(Div. A) UTA Arad
Carpați Sinaia (Div. C)	3–1	(Div. A) Știința Cluj
Electromotor Timișoara (Div. C)	0–2	(Div. A) CSMS Iași
Metalul Turnu Severin (Div. C)	5–2 (a.e.t.)	(Div. B) CSM Cluj
22 April 1964
Siderurgistul Hunedoara (Div. C)	3–1	(Div. A) Dinamo Pitești
4 June 1964
Dinamo Bacău (Div. B)	1–1 (a.e.t.)	(Div. A) Steaua București

== Second round proper ==
Team 1	Score	Team 2
3 June 1964
ASA Crișul Oradea	3–0	Metalul Turnu Severin
4 June 1964
Siderurgistul Hunedoara	2–1	CSMS Iași
Rapid București	8–0	Flacăra Roșie București
Farul Constanța	4–1	AS Aiud
CSM Sibiu	1–0	Textila Sfântu Gheorghe
Știința Timișoara	1–0	Carpați Sinaia
Dinamo București	6–0	Minerul Baia Mare
10 June 1964
Steaua București	12–0	CIL Blaj

== Quarter-finals ==
Team 1	Score	Team 2
1 July 1964
ASA Crișul Oradea	1–0	Siderurgistul Hunedoara
Dinamo București	0–0 (a.e.t.)	Știința Timișoara
CSM Sibiu	2–1	Farul Constanța
Steaua București	2–1	Rapid București
2 July 1964 — Replay
Dinamo București	2–1	Știința Timișoara

== Semi-finals ==
Team 1	Score	Team 2
12 July 1964
Dinamo București	1–0 (a.e.t.)	ASA Crișul Oradea
Steaua București	2–1	CSM Sibiu

== Final ==
19 July 1964
17:30 EET

Dinamo București	5–3	Steaua București
Popescu 3', 88'; Nunweiller 53'; Pârcălab 60'; Frățilă 83'	Report	Creiniceanu 12'; Constantin 14' (pen.), 63'

23 August, Bucharest
Attendance: 70,000
Referee: Andries Van den Leeuwen (NED)

Cupa României 1963–64 winners

2nd title
