= Vagonul Arad =

- Full name: Vagonul Arad
- Nicknames: Vagonarii (The Wagoners)
- Short name: Vagonul
- Founded: 1911
- Dissolved: 2006
- Ground: Vagonul

Chart showing the progress of Vagonul's finishes in the national leagues from 1932 to their dissolution in 2006.

Vagonul Arad was a Romanian football club based in Arad. Founded in 1911, it quickly became one of the city’s top teams. The club was affiliated with Astra Arad, a rail equipment manufacturing company. It was dissolved in 2006.

== History ==
=== 1911–1940 ===
The club was formed in Arad in 1911 when AMEF (Asociația Muncitorilor pentru Educație Fizică) (lit. 'Workers Association for Physical Education') merged with Clubul Sportiv al Fabricii De Vagoane (Rail Cars Factory Sports Club), keeping the first ones name until 1948.

After World War I it qualified for the national championship 3 times, but never being able to pass the semi-finals.

During 1932-1940 we see the club playing in Divizia A, their best performance - 2nd place at the end of the 1935-36 season.

In 1940 AMEF is dissolved by the legionar regime, but after World War II, we see it for a couple of years in Liga II (1946–1948).

=== 1946–1964 ===
AMEFA was admitted to the first season of Divizia B after the Second World War, finishing 2nd in Series I and qualifying for the promotion play-off, where it lost 1–2 in the semifinals against the 2nd-placed team in Series III, Karres Mediaș. In the 1947–48 season, AMEFA finished 9th in Series III and was relegated to Divizia C. In 1948, it merged with the Uzina de Vagoane Arad (lit. 'Arad Wagon Enterprise') football team, forming a new club named UVA AMEFA, led by coach Băneșu, who was soon replaced by former player Albu. The team competed for one season in Divizia C, ranking 4th in Series I by February 1949, when Divizia C was shut down. Renamed Metalul AMEFA, the team played in the Arad Regional Championship until the end of the 1954 season, when it won the title and earned promotion to Divizia B after finishing 1st in Series III of the promotion play-off held in Sibiu.

In the 1955 Divizia B season, Metalul ranked 14th in Series II and was relegated to the newly re-established Divizia C. Renamed Energia Metalul, the team won Series IV of the 1956 Divizia C, finishing five points ahead of the runners-up Flamura Roșie Râmnicu Vâlcea and 3rd-placed Știința Craiova, and returned quickly to the second division. The team, led by Ștefan Pernecki, included Kiss, Pîrvulescu, Juhasz, Sîrbu, Järger, Ujj, Soliu, Busch, Tamaș, Bucurescu, Moldoveanu, Petica, Mărghidan, Renich, Popa, Mircea, and Tipei.

Once again renamed UVA AMEFA, the team finished 7th in Series I of the 1957–58 season, 12th in Series I in 1958–59, 9th in Series III in 1959–60, and 12th in Series III in 1960–61.

Before the 1961–62season, the team was once again renamed, this time Vagonul Arad, more clearly reflecting the name of the enterprise that provided financial support, and Toma Jurcă was appointed as head coach. Under his guidance, Vagonul finished 5th in Series III and 12th in the same series the following year, which led to relegation to Divizia C. Jurcă remained in charge, and the team managed to bounce back the following year, winning the West Series of Divizia C in the 1963–64 season and securing promotion to Divizia B once again under his leadership.

=== 1964–1989 ===
In Divizia B, the team led by Toma Jurcă competed in Series II, ranking 6th in the 1964–65 season and 3rd in both 1965–66 and 1966–67. Vagonul managed to win the series in the 1967–68 season, thus securing promotion to Divizia A and returning to the Romanian top flight after twenty-eight years. That same season, Vagonul Arad also reached the semi-finals of Cupa României, where it lost 0–2 to the first division side Rapid București. The squad included Arghișan, Chivu, Boroș, Mülroth, Gherghel, Schweillinger, Petschowschi III, Matușinca, Lenard, Stănoaie, Dembrovschi, Mihai, Secui, Dvorszak, Gh. Macavei, and I. Macavei.

After only one season of top class football, the team relegates to Liga II and from now forward we see it going only down. 1969–1971 Liga II, after this Liga III, where they were close to the regional championship, but in 1973 a merger with CFR Arad saved them. The new team was given the name Unirea, and plays in Liga II until 1977, in 1974 changing its name again, this time to Rapid Arad. The 1977–1980 period sees the club in Liga III, 1980–1984 in Liga II, 1984–1989 Liga III. In 1985 – CSM Rapid, 1986 – Vagonul, 1987 – CSM Vagonul.

Chronology of names
Name	Period
AMEFA Arad	1911–1940
UVA AMEFA Arad	1948–1954
Metalul AMEFA Arad	1954–1956
Energia Metalul Arad	1956–1958
UVA AMEFA Arad	1958–1961
Vagonul Arad	1961–1973
Unirea Arad	1973–1974
Rapid Arad	1974–1986
Vagonul Arad	1986–1991
Astra Arad	1991–1994
FC Arad	1994–1996
Telecom Arad	1996–2005
Romtelecom Arad	2005–2006

=== 1989–2006 ===
The club succeeds to promote to Liga II once again in 1989, from 1991 with the name of Astra. The spell lasts only until 1992, and the club sees itself in Liga III once again. The name changes again: FC Arad in 1994, Telecom Arad in 1996, and Romtelecom in 2005.

At the end of the Liga III 2005-06 season, the club finished 13th and relegated to the Arad County Championship (Fourth League), and with this the disappearance of another old Romanian football club.

== Honours ==
Divizia A

- Runners-up (1): 1935–36

Divizia B

- Winners (1): 1967–68
- Runners-up (1): 1946–47

Divizia C

- Winners (5): 1956, 1963–64, 1971–72, 1979–80, 1988–89
- Runners-up (3): 1986–87, 1987–88, 2000–01

Arad Regional Championship

- Winners (2): 1952, 1954

== Notable former players ==
The footballers mentioned below have played at least 1 season for Vagonul Arad and also played in Liga I for another team.

- (Romania) Ion Atodiresei
- (Romania) Helmut Duckadam
- (Romania) Adrian Lucaci
- (Romania) Ștefan Onisie

== Former managers ==
- (Romania) Gheorghe Albu (1959–1964)
- (Romania) Ionuț Popa (1996–1997)
