= 1967–68 Divizia C =

Third tier Romanian football league

Divizia C
- Season: 1967–68

The 1967–68 Divizia C was the 12th season of Liga III, the third tier of the Romanian football league system.

The format was maintained with four series, each consisting of 14 teams. At the end of the season, the winners of each series were promoted to Divizia B, and the runners-up qualified for promotion/relegation play-offs against the 13th and 14th placed teams from the two series of the second division, while the bottom two teams from each series were relegated to the Regional Championship.

By topping their respective groups, Oțelul Galați, Dunărea Giurgiu, Electroputere Craiova, and Medicina Cluj secured promotion to 1968–69 Divizia B.

== Team changes ==
=== To Divizia C ===
Relegated from Divizia B

- Progresul Brăila
- Oțelul Galați
- Minerul Lupeni
- Unirea Dej

Promoted from Regional Championship

- Medicina Iași
- SUT Galați
- TUG București
- Chimia Turnu Măgurele
- Unio Satu Mare
- Știința Târgu Mureș
- UM Timișoara
- Victoria Boboc

=== From Divizia C ===
Promoted to Divizia B

- Victoria Roman
- Portul Constanța
- Metalul Hunedoara
- Olimpia Oradea

Relegated to Regional Championship

- Flamura Roșie Tecuci
- Locomotiva Iași
- Muscelul Câmpulung
- CFR Roșiori
- Autorapid Craiova
- Aurul Zlatna
- Arieșul Turda
- Voința Reghin

=== Renamed teams ===
Electrica Fieni was renamed Viitorul Fieni.

Recolta Carei was renamed Victoria Carei.

Știința Târgu Mureș was renamed Medicina Târgu Mureș.

Sătmăreana Satu Mare was renamed Metalul Satu Mare.

Victoria Boboc was renamed Șoimii Buzău.

=== Other teams ===
Metalul Plopeni merged with Rapid Mizil on 13 March 1967, took their place in Divizia C, and was renamed Rapid Plopeni.

Electrica Fieni and Cimentul Fieni, the first one being absorbed by the second one.

== League tables ==
=== East Series ===
| Pos | Team | Pld | W | D | L | GF | GA | GD | Pts | Qualification or relegation |
|---|---|---|---|---|---|---|---|---|---|---|
| 1 | Oțelul Galați (C, P) | 26 | 15 | 5 | 6 | 39 | 16 | +23 | 35 | Promotion to Divizia B |
| 2 | Gloria Bârlad (Q) | 26 | 14 | 7 | 5 | 42 | 23 | +19 | 35 | Qualification to promotion play-off |
| 3 | Ancora Galați | 26 | 13 | 4 | 9 | 41 | 32 | +9 | 30 | |
| 4 | Foresta Fălticeni | 26 | 11 | 8 | 7 | 34 | 28 | +6 | 30 | |
| 5 | Medicina Iași | 26 | 11 | 6 | 9 | 38 | 26 | +12 | 28 | |
| 6 | Petrolul Moinești | 26 | 10 | 8 | 8 | 32 | 27 | +5 | 28 | |
| 7 | Șoimii Buzău | 26 | 10 | 8 | 8 | 36 | 33 | +3 | 28 | |
| 8 | Minobrad Vatra Dornei | 26 | 12 | 4 | 10 | 31 | 33 | −2 | 28 | |
| 9 | Textila Buhuși | 26 | 10 | 6 | 10 | 36 | 29 | +7 | 26 | |
| 10 | Metalul Buzău | 26 | 9 | 8 | 9 | 30 | 25 | +5 | 26 | |
| 11 | Gloria CFR Galați | 26 | 11 | 4 | 11 | 31 | 29 | +2 | 26 | |
| 12 | Unirea Focșani | 26 | 10 | 5 | 11 | 33 | 31 | +2 | 25 | |
| 13 | SUT Galați | 26 | 6 | 4 | 16 | 28 | 57 | −29 | 16 | |
| 14 | Metalul Rădăuți (R) | 26 | 0 | 3 | 23 | 6 | 68 | −62 | 3 | Relegation to County Championship |

Source: romaniansoccer.ro
Rules for classification: 1) Points; 2) Goal difference; 3) Number of goals scored.
(C) Champions; (P) Promoted; (Q) Qualified for the phase indicated; (R) Relegated

=== South Series ===
| Pos | Team | Pld | W | D | L | GF | GA | GD | Pts | Qualification or relegation |
|---|---|---|---|---|---|---|---|---|---|---|
| 1 | Dunărea Giurgiu (C, P) | 26 | 15 | 5 | 6 | 42 | 23 | +19 | 35 | Promotion to Divizia B |
| 2 | Progresul Brăila (Q) | 26 | 15 | 4 | 7 | 47 | 20 | +27 | 34 | Qualification to promotion play-off |
| 3 | Metalul Târgoviște | 26 | 14 | 5 | 7 | 46 | 23 | +23 | 33 | |
| 4 | Rapid Plopeni | 26 | 14 | 4 | 8 | 42 | 31 | +11 | 32 | |
| 5 | SN Oltenița | 26 | 13 | 6 | 7 | 35 | 30 | +5 | 32 | |
| 6 | Chimia Turnu Măgurele | 26 | 10 | 7 | 9 | 22 | 31 | −9 | 27 | |
| 7 | Flacăra Roșie București | 26 | 10 | 5 | 11 | 28 | 22 | +6 | 25 | |
| 8 | IMU Medgidia | 26 | 9 | 7 | 10 | 27 | 27 | 0 | 25 | |
| 9 | Electrica Constanța | 26 | 9 | 5 | 12 | 32 | 38 | −6 | 23 | |
| 10 | TUG București | 26 | 7 | 9 | 10 | 28 | 34 | −6 | 23 | |
| 11 | Rapid CF București | 26 | 9 | 5 | 12 | 29 | 40 | −11 | 23 | |
| 12 | Stuful Tulcea | 26 | 10 | 2 | 14 | 23 | 24 | −1 | 22 | |
| 13 | Oltul Sfântu Gheorghe | 26 | 5 | 7 | 14 | 26 | 40 | −14 | 17 | |
| 14 | Viitorul Fieni (R) | 26 | 5 | 3 | 18 | 20 | 54 | −34 | 13 | Relegation to County Championship |

Source: romaniansoccer.ro
Rules for classification: 1) Points; 2) Goal difference; 3) Number of goals scored.
(C) Champions; (P) Promoted; (Q) Qualified for the phase indicated; (R) Relegated

=== West Series ===
| Pos | Team | Pld | W | D | L | GF | GA | GD | Pts | Qualification or relegation |
|---|---|---|---|---|---|---|---|---|---|---|
| 1 | Electroputere Craiova (C, P) | 26 | 16 | 3 | 7 | 45 | 21 | +24 | 35 | Promotion to Divizia B |
| 2 | Metalul Turnu Severin (Q) | 26 | 14 | 6 | 6 | 54 | 28 | +26 | 34 | Qualification to promotion play-off |
| 3 | Chimia Făgăraș | 26 | 13 | 5 | 8 | 49 | 33 | +16 | 31 | |
| 4 | Minerul Anina | 26 | 13 | 3 | 10 | 44 | 34 | +10 | 29 | |
| 5 | Minerul Lupeni | 26 | 12 | 5 | 9 | 48 | 39 | +9 | 29 | |
| 6 | UM Timișoara | 26 | 11 | 5 | 10 | 42 | 39 | +3 | 27 | |
| 7 | Victoria Călan | 26 | 11 | 5 | 10 | 40 | 42 | −2 | 27 | |
| 8 | Tractorul Brașov | 26 | 10 | 6 | 10 | 41 | 36 | +5 | 26 | |
| 9 | Mureșul Deva | 26 | 10 | 5 | 11 | 52 | 44 | +8 | 25 | |
| 10 | ASA Sibiu | 26 | 8 | 8 | 10 | 41 | 39 | +2 | 24 | |
| 11 | Victoria Târgu Jiu | 26 | 8 | 6 | 12 | 28 | 47 | −19 | 22 | |
| 12 | Progresul Strehaia | 26 | 8 | 4 | 14 | 32 | 57 | −25 | 20 | |
| 13 | Progresul Corabia | 26 | 8 | 2 | 16 | 36 | 65 | −29 | 18 | |
| 14 | CFR Caransebeș (R) | 26 | 6 | 5 | 15 | 40 | 68 | −28 | 17 | Relegation to County Championship |

Source: romaniansoccer.ro
Rules for classification: 1) Points; 2) Goal difference; 3) Number of goals scored.
(C) Champions; (P) Promoted; (Q) Qualified for the phase indicated; (R) Relegated

=== North Series ===
| Pos | Team | Pld | W | D | L | GF | GA | GD | Pts | Qualification or relegation |
|---|---|---|---|---|---|---|---|---|---|---|
| 1 | Medicina Cluj (C, P) | 26 | 12 | 7 | 7 | 51 | 23 | +28 | 31 | Promotion to Divizia B |
| 2 | Chimica Târnăveni (Q) | 26 | 13 | 5 | 8 | 39 | 28 | +11 | 31 | Qualification to promotion play-off |
| 3 | Victoria Carei | 26 | 14 | 3 | 9 | 46 | 41 | +5 | 31 | |
| 4 | Metalul Aiud | 26 | 14 | 1 | 11 | 44 | 42 | +2 | 29 | |
| 5 | Soda Ocna Mureș | 26 | 12 | 3 | 11 | 36 | 40 | −4 | 27 | |
| 6 | Medicina Târgu Mureș | 26 | 11 | 4 | 11 | 50 | 40 | +10 | 26 | |
| 7 | Metalul Copșa Mică | 26 | 9 | 7 | 10 | 36 | 43 | −7 | 25 | |
| 8 | Unio Satu Mare | 26 | 10 | 4 | 12 | 35 | 25 | +10 | 24 | |
| 9 | Unirea Dej | 26 | 11 | 2 | 13 | 39 | 39 | 0 | 24 | |
| 10 | Metalul Satu Mare | 26 | 10 | 4 | 12 | 31 | 34 | −3 | 24 | |
| 11 | Faianța Sighisoara | 26 | 10 | 4 | 12 | 36 | 45 | −9 | 24 | |
| 12 | Steaua Roșie Salonta | 26 | 9 | 5 | 12 | 29 | 37 | −8 | 23 | |
| 13 | Minerul Baia Sprie | 26 | 10 | 3 | 13 | 29 | 61 | −32 | 23 | |
| 14 | Minerul Bihor (R) | 26 | 9 | 4 | 13 | 36 | 39 | −3 | 22 | Relegation to County Championship |

Source: romaniansoccer.ro
Rules for classification: 1) Points; 2) Goal difference; 3) Number of goals scored.
(C) Champions; (P) Promoted; (Q) Qualified for the phase indicated; (R) Relegated

== Divizia B play-off ==
The 13th and 14th-placed teams of the Divizia B faces the 2nd-placed teams from the series of the Divizia C. The play-off tournaments were played in Brașov and Arad.

=== Group I (Brașov) ===
| Pos | Team | Pld | W | D | L | GF | GA | GD | Pts | Promotion or relegation |
|---|---|---|---|---|---|---|---|---|---|---|
| 1 | Progresul Brăila (P) | 3 | 2 | 1 | 0 | 6 | 1 | +5 | 5 | Promotion to Divizia B |
| 2 | Chimia Râmnicu Vâlcea (P) | 3 | 1 | 2 | 0 | 3 | 2 | +1 | 4 | Promotion to Divizia B |
| 3 | Gloria Bârlad (P) | 3 | 1 | 1 | 1 | 5 | 7 | −2 | 3 | Promotion to Divizia B |
| 4 | Victoria Roman (R) | 3 | 0 | 0 | 3 | 2 | 6 | −4 | 0 | Relegation to Divizia C |

Source: romaniansoccer.ro
Rules for classification: 1) Points 2) Head-to-head points; 3) Head-to-head goal difference; 4) Head-to-head goals scored; 5) Head-to-head away goals scored; 6) Goal difference; 7) Goals scored.
(P) Promoted; (R) Relegated

=== Group II (Arad) ===
| Pos | Team | Pld | W | D | L | GF | GA | GD | Pts | Promotion or relegation |
|---|---|---|---|---|---|---|---|---|---|---|
| 1 | Gaz Metan Mediaș (P) | 3 | 2 | 0 | 1 | 2 | 1 | +1 | 4 | Promotion to Divizia B |
| 2 | Cugir (P) | 3 | 2 | 0 | 1 | 3 | 2 | +1 | 4 | Promotion to Divizia B |
| 3 | Metalul Turnu Severin (P) | 3 | 1 | 1 | 1 | 3 | 3 | 0 | 3 | Promotion to Divizia B |
| 4 | Chimica Târnăveni (R) | 3 | 0 | 1 | 2 | 1 | 3 | −2 | 1 | Relegation to Divizia C |

Source: romaniansoccer.ro
Rules for classification: 1) Points 2) Head-to-head points; 3) Head-to-head goal difference; 4) Head-to-head goals scored; 5) Head-to-head away goals scored; 6) Goal difference; 7) Goals scored.
(P) Promoted; (R) Relegated

== See also ==
- 1967–68 Divizia A
- 1967–68 Divizia B
- 1967–68 Regional Championship
- 1967–68 Cupa României
