= 1967–68 Divizia B =

Divizia B
- Season: 1967–68
- Promoted: Politehnica Iași; Vagonul Arad; Crișul Oradea
- Relegated: Victoria Roman
- Top goalscorer: Ion Ștefan (Series I, 14 goals); Romulus Petrescu (Series II, 13 goals)

The 1967–68 Divizia B was the 28th season of the second tier of the Romanian football league system.

The format has been maintained to two series, each of them having 14 teams. At the end of the season, the winners of the series are promoted to Divizia A. Due to expansion of Divizia A and Divizia B from 14 to 16 teams, also the second places from the series played a promotion play-off, at the end of which the second place from the second series also promoted to Divizia A and last two places from both series played a relegation play-off against second places from Divizia C, at the end of which only one team relegated.

== Team changes ==
=== To Divizia B ===
Relegated from Divizia A

- CSMS Iași
- Politehnica Timișoara

Promoted from Divizia C

- Victoria Roman
- Portul Constanța
- Metalul Hunedoara
- Olimpia Oradea

=== From Divizia B ===
Promoted to Divizia A

- Dinamo Bacău
- ASA Mureșul Târgu Mureș

Relegated to Divizia C

- Progresul Brăila
- Minerul Lupeni
- Oțelul Galați
- Unirea Dej

=== Renamed teams ===
CSMS Iași was renamed Politehnica Iași.

Metalurgistul București was renamed Metalul București.

=== Other teams ===
Siderurgistul Galați gave away its place in the Divizia B to Politehnica Galați. Siderurgistul was then dissolved.

Clujeana Cluj merged with CFR Cluj, the first one being absorbed by the second one.

Oltul Râmnicu Vâlcea merged with Chimia Govora and was renamed Chimia Râmnicu Vâlcea.

Dinamo Victoria București merged with Viitorul Electronica București, the former being absorbed by the latter, which was subsequently renamed Electronica Obor București.

== Serie I ==
=== League table ===
Pos	Team	Pld	W	D	L	GF	GA	GD	Pts	Promotion or relegation
1	Politehnica Iași (C, P)	26	14	4	8	37	24	+13	32	Promotion to Divizia A
2	Politehnica Galați (Q)	26	12	6	8	43	28	+15	30	Qualification to promotion play-off
3	Electronica Obor București	26	11	8	7	52	38	+14	30	
4	Metalul București	26	11	6	9	30	24	+6	28	
5	Ceahlăul Piatra Neamț	26	13	2	11	30	32	−2	28	
6	Portul Constanța	26	12	3	11	32	33	−1	27	
7	Politehnica București	26	10	6	10	35	26	+9	26	
8	Flacăra Moreni	26	10	5	11	30	35	−5	25	
9	CFR Pașcani	26	11	3	12	33	46	−13	25	
10	Chimia Suceava	26	9	6	11	27	27	0	24	
11	Metrom Brașov	26	8	8	10	29	33	−4	24	
12	Poiana Câmpina	26	11	2	13	23	31	−8	24	
13	Chimia Râmnicu Vâlcea (O)	26	8	6	12	27	36	−9	22	Qualification to relegation play-off
14	Victoria Roman (R)	26	8	3	15	24	39	−15	19	Qualification to relegation play-off

Source: romaniansoccer.ro
Rules for classification: 1) Points 2) Head-to-head points; 3) Head-to-head goal difference; 4) Head-to-head goals scored; 5) Head-to-head away goals scored; 6) Goal difference; 7) Goals scored.
(C) Champions; (O) Play-off winners; (P) Promoted; (Q) Qualified for the phase indicated; (R) Relegated

=== Top scorers ===
The Series I top scorers:

14 goals

- (Romania) Ion Ștefan (Electronica Obor București)

12 goals

- (Romania) Ion Constantin (Electronica Obor București)
- (Romania) Mihai Olteanu (Ceahlăul Piatra Neamț)

10 goals

- (Romania) Marin Voinea (Metalul București)
- (Romania) Cojocaru (Politehnica Galați)
- (Romania) Aurelian Cuperman (Politehnica Iași)

9 goals

- (Romania) Cristian Stătescu (Politehnica Galați)
- (Romania) Neagu (Politehnica Galați)
- (Romania) Emil Lupulescu (Politehnica Iași)
- (Romania) Ion Drăgan (Flacăra Moreni)
- (Romania) Baicu (CFR Pașcani)
- (Romania) Mihăilescu (Chimia Râmnicu Vâlcea)

== Serie II ==
=== League table ===
Pos	Team	Pld	W	D	L	GF	GA	GD	Pts	Promotion or relegation
1	Vagonul Arad (C, P)	26	15	7	4	43	22	+21	37	Promotion to Divizia A
2	Crișul Oradea (O, P)	26	12	7	7	32	26	+6	31	Qualification to promotion play-off
3	CFR Timișoara	26	11	5	10	38	29	+9	27	
4	Minerul Baia Mare	26	11	5	10	30	34	−4	27	
5	CFR Cluj	26	11	3	12	46	37	+9	25	
6	Politehnica Timișoara	26	10	5	11	48	43	+5	25	
7	CFR Arad	26	11	3	12	35	31	+4	25	
8	Metalul Hunedoara	26	10	5	11	24	23	+1	25	
9	CSM Sibiu	26	9	7	10	31	34	−3	25	
10	IS Câmpia Turzii	26	9	6	11	31	34	−3	24	
11	Olimpia Oradea	26	11	2	13	27	37	−10	24	
12	CSM Reșița	26	9	5	12	33	34	−1	23	
13	Gaz Metan Mediaș (O)	26	9	5	12	27	42	−15	23	Qualification to relegation play-off
14	Cugir (O)	26	10	3	13	21	40	−19	23	Qualification to relegation play-off

Source: romaniansoccer.ro
Rules for classification: 1) Points 2) Head-to-head points; 3) Head-to-head goal difference; 4) Head-to-head goals scored; 5) Head-to-head away goals scored; 6) Goal difference; 7) Goals scored.
(C) Champions; (O) Play-off winners; (P) Promoted

=== Top scorers ===
The Series II top scorers:

13 goals

- (Romania) Romulus Petrescu (CFR Cluj)
- (Romania) Nicolae Arnoțchi (CSM Reșița)
- (Romania) Simion Surdan (Politehnica Timișoara)

11 goals

- (Romania) Otto Dembrovschi (Vagonul Arad)
- (Romania) Ianis Mazurachis (CFR Cluj)
- (Romania) Nicolae Laufceac (CSM Sibiu)

10 goals

- (Romania) Petrică (Olimpia Oradea)

9 goals

- (Romania) Attila Kun (Crișul Oradea)
- (Romania) Cotormani (Politehnica Timișoara)
- (Romania) Petru Regep (Politehnica Timișoara)

8 goals

- (Romania) Emanoil Mițaru (CFR Timișoara)
- (Romania) Seceleanu (CFR Timișoara)

== Divizia A play-off ==
The 13th and 14th-placed teams of the Divizia A faces the 2nd-placed teams from the series of the Divizia B. The play-off tournament was played in Timișoara.

Pos	Team	Pld	W	D	L	GF	GA	GD	Pts	Promotion or relegation
1	Crișul Oradea (C, P)	3	2	1	0	5	2	+3	5	Promotion to Divizia A
2	Progresul București (P)	3	2	0	1	8	4	+4	4	Promotion to Divizia A
3	Steagul Roșu Brașov (R)	3	1	1	1	4	5	−1	3	Relegation to Divizia B
4	Politehnica Galați (R)	3	0	0	3	3	9	−6	0	Relegation to Divizia B

Source: lastegaru.net
Rules for classification: 1) Points 2) Head-to-head points; 3) Head-to-head goal difference; 4) Head-to-head goals scored; 5) Head-to-head away goals scored; 6) Goal difference; 7) Goals scored.
(C) Champions; (P) Promoted; (R) Relegated

=== Round 1 ===
Team 1	Score	Team 2
Steagul Roșu Brașov (A)	3–1	Politehnica Galați (B)
Progresul București (A)	1–2	Crișul Oradea (B)

=== Round 2 ===
Team 1	Score	Team 2
Steagul Roșu Brașov (A)	1–1	Crișul Oradea (B)
Progresul București (A)	4–2	Politehnica Galați (B)

=== Round 3 ===
Team 1	Score	Team 2
Steagul Roșu Brașov (A)	0–3	Progresul București (A)
Politehnica Galați (B)	0–2	Crișul Oradea (B)

== Divizia B play-off ==
The 13th and 14th-placed teams of the Divizia B faces the 2nd-placed teams from the series of the Divizia C. The play-off tournaments were played in Brașov and Arad.

=== Group I (Brașov) ===
Pos	Team	Pld	W	D	L	GF	GA	GD	Pts	Promotion or relegation
1	Progresul Brăila (C, P)	3	2	1	0	6	1	+5	5	Promotion to Divizia B
2	Chimia Râmnicu Vâlcea (P)	3	1	2	0	3	2	+1	4	Promotion to Divizia B
3	Gloria Bârlad (P)	3	1	1	1	5	7	−2	3	Promotion to Divizia B
4	Victoria Roman (R)	3	0	0	3	2	6	−4	0	Relegation to Divizia C

Source: romaniansoccer.ro
Rules for classification: 1) Points 2) Head-to-head points; 3) Head-to-head goal difference; 4) Head-to-head goals scored; 5) Head-to-head away goals scored; 6) Goal difference; 7) Goals scored.
(C) Champions; (P) Promoted; (R) Relegated

=== Group II (Arad) ===
Pos	Team	Pld	W	D	L	GF	GA	GD	Pts	Promotion or relegation
1	Gaz Metan Mediaș (C, P)	3	2	0	1	2	1	+1	4	Promotion to Divizia B
2	Cugir (P)	3	2	0	1	3	2	+1	4	Promotion to Divizia B
3	Metalul Turnu Severin (P)	3	1	1	1	3	3	0	3	Promotion to Divizia B
4	Chimica Târnăveni (R)	3	0	1	2	1	3	−2	1	Relegation to Divizia C

Source: romaniansoccer.ro
Rules for classification: 1) Points 2) Head-to-head points; 3) Head-to-head goal difference; 4) Head-to-head goals scored; 5) Head-to-head away goals scored; 6) Goal difference; 7) Goals scored.
(C) Champions; (P) Promoted; (R) Relegated

== See also ==
- 1967–68 Divizia A
- 1967–68 Divizia C
- 1967–68 Regional Championship
- 1967–68 Cupa României
