= 1966–67 Divizia C =

Third tier Romanian football league

Divizia C
- Season: 1966–67

The 1966–67 Divizia C was the 11th season of Liga III, the third tier of the Romanian football league system.

The format was maintained with four series, each consisting of 14 teams. At the end of the season, the winners of each series were promoted to Divizia B, while the bottom two teams from each series were relegated to the Regional Championship. By topping their respective groups, Victoria Roman, Portul Constanța, Metalul Hunedoara, and Olimpia Oradea secured promotion to 1967–68 Divizia B.

== Team changes ==
=== To Divizia C ===
Relegated from Divizia B

- CFR Roșiori
- Metalul Târgoviște
- Recolta Carei
- Arieșul Turda

Promoted from Regional Championship

- Ancora Galați
- Gloria Bârlad
- Metalul Buzău
- Autorapid Craiova
- Aurul Zlatna
- Medicina Cluj
- Stuful Tulcea
- ASA Sibiu

=== From Divizia C ===
Promoted to Divizia B

- Chimia Suceava
- Metrom Brașov
- CFR Timișoara
- Unirea Dej

Relegated to Regional Championship

- Minerul Câmpulung
- Chimia Gheorghe Gheorghiu-Dej
- Unirea Negrești
- Marina Mangalia
- Rulmentul Brașov
- Electromotor Timișoara
- Gloria Bistrița
- Forestiera Sighetu Marmației

=== Renamed teams ===
AS Aiud was renamed Metalul Aiud.

Minerul Deva was renamed Mureșul Deva.

Progresul Reghin was renamed Voința Reghin.

Metalosport Galați was renamed Gloria CFR Galați.

Tehnometal București was renamed Rapid CF București.

Fructexport Focșani was renamed Unirea Focșani.

== League tables ==
=== East Series ===
Pos	Team	Pld	W	D	L	GF	GA	GD	Pts	Qualification or relegation
1	Victoria Roman (C, P)	26	15	3	8	45	30	+15	33	Promotion to Divizia B
2	Gloria Bârlad	26	13	4	9	34	26	+8	30	
3	Metalul Buzău	26	14	2	10	44	43	+1	30	
4	Ancora Galați	26	13	3	10	43	28	+15	29	
5	Unirea Focșani	26	11	5	10	41	25	+16	27	
6	Foresta Fălticeni	26	11	5	10	44	45	−1	27	
7	Metalul Rădăuți	26	12	3	11	30	48	−18	27	
8	Minobrad Vatra Dornei	26	12	2	12	29	32	−3	26	
9	Textila Buhuși	26	12	1	13	32	41	−9	25	
10	Rapid Mizil	26	10	4	12	27	27	0	24	
11	Petrolul Moinești	26	10	3	13	49	44	+5	23	
12	Gloria CFR Galați	26	8	7	11	29	36	−7	23	
13	Flamura Roșie Tecuci (R)	26	9	5	12	33	43	−10	23	Relegation to Regional Championship
14	Locomotiva Iași (R)	26	5	7	14	24	44	−20	17	Relegation to Regional Championship

Source: romaniansoccer.ro
Rules for classification: 1) Points; 2) Goal difference; 3) Number of goals scored.
(C) Champions; (P) Promoted; (R) Relegated

=== South Series ===
Pos	Team	Pld	W	D	L	GF	GA	GD	Pts	Qualification or relegation
1	Portul Constanța (C, P)	26	16	5	5	44	17	+27	37	Promotion to Divizia B
2	IMU Medgidia	26	13	8	5	45	18	+27	34	
3	Metalul Târgoviște	26	15	3	8	42	18	+24	33	
4	Dunărea Giurgiu	26	14	2	10	39	26	+13	30	
5	Electrica Constanța	26	13	4	9	39	34	+5	30	
6	Oltul Sfântu Gheorghe	26	12	3	11	42	37	+5	27	
7	Stuful Tulcea	26	10	6	10	38	39	−1	26	
8	Șantierul Naval Oltenița	26	11	3	12	30	35	−5	25	
9	Flacăra Roșie București	26	10	4	12	45	45	0	24	
10	Rapid CF București	26	7	8	11	27	34	−7	22	
11	Progresul Corabia	26	10	2	14	28	50	−22	22	
12	Electrica Fieni	26	8	4	14	29	35	−6	20	
13	Muscelul Câmpulung (R)	26	6	7	13	19	39	−20	19	Relegation to Regional Championship
14	CFR Roșiori (R)	26	5	5	16	14	54	−40	15	Relegation to Regional Championship

Source: romaniansoccer.ro
Rules for classification: 1) Points; 2) Goal difference; 3) Number of goals scored.
(C) Champions; (P) Promoted; (R) Relegated

=== West Series ===
Pos	Team	Pld	W	D	L	GF	GA	GD	Pts	Qualification or relegation
1	Metalul Hunedoara (C, P)	26	16	4	6	57	20	+37	36	Promotion to Divizia B
2	Tractorul Brașov	26	14	4	8	51	31	+20	32	
3	Electroputere Craiova	26	14	4	8	52	34	+18	32	
4	Chimia Făgăraș	26	15	2	9	53	41	+12	32	
5	Minerul Anina	26	14	2	10	46	34	+12	30	
6	Mureșul Deva	26	12	5	9	45	34	+11	29	
7	Victoria Târgu Jiu	26	10	6	10	38	40	−2	26	
8	ASA Sibiu	26	7	9	10	37	41	−4	23	
9	Victoria Călan	26	9	5	12	22	35	−13	23	
10	CFR Caransebeș	26	9	4	13	19	49	−30	22	
11	Metalul Turnu Severin	26	8	6	12	35	65	−30	22	
12	Progresul Strehaia	26	7	6	13	35	43	−8	20	
13	Autorapid Craiova (R)	26	9	1	16	39	48	−9	19	Relegation to Regional Championship
14	Aurul Zlatna (R)	26	8	2	16	33	47	−14	18	Relegation to Regional Championship

Source: romaniansoccer.ro
Rules for classification: 1) Points; 2) Goal difference; 3) Number of goals scored.
(C) Champions; (P) Promoted; (R) Relegated

=== North Series ===
Pos	Team	Pld	W	D	L	GF	GA	GD	Pts	Qualification or relegation
1	Olimpia Oradea (C, P)	26	16	5	5	44	19	+25	37	Promotion to Divizia B
2	Medicina Cluj	26	14	7	5	41	20	+21	35	
3	Recolta Carei	26	12	5	9	41	27	+14	29	
4	Sătmăreana Satu Mare	26	11	4	11	30	29	+1	26	
5	Soda Ocna Mureș	26	10	6	10	32	35	−3	26	
6	Minerul Bihor	26	11	3	12	37	36	+1	25	
7	Minerul Baia Sprie	26	11	3	12	40	42	−2	25	
8	Metalul Aiud	26	9	7	10	39	42	−3	25	
9	Chimica Târnăveni	26	11	3	12	34	39	−5	25	
10	Steaua Roșie Salonta	26	9	7	10	34	46	−12	25	
11	Metalul Copșa Mică	26	11	2	13	36	33	+3	24	
12	Faianța Sighisoara	26	11	2	13	38	44	−6	24	
13	Arieșul Turda (R)	26	10	2	14	31	33	−2	22	Relegation to Regional Championship
14	Voința Reghin (R)	26	6	4	16	23	55	−32	16	Relegation to Regional Championship

Source: romaniansoccer.ro
Rules for classification: 1) Points; 2) Goal difference; 3) Number of goals scored.
(C) Champions; (P) Promoted; (R) Relegated

== See also ==
- 1966–67 Divizia A
- 1966–67 Divizia B
- 1966–67 Regional Championship
- 1966–67 Cupa României
