= Dumitru Manea =

Romanian footballer

Personal information
- Date of birth: 7 December 1948
- Place of birth: Cernica, Romania
- Date of death: 31 May 2011 (aged 62)
- Height: 1.79 m (5 ft 10 in)
- Position: Left back

Senior career*
Years	Team	Apps	(Gls)
1965–1971	Steaua București	30	(4)
1971–1972	Metalul Târgoviște	29	(6)
1972–1979	Sportul Studențesc București	166	(1)
1979–1980	Mecanică Fină București		
1980–1982	Sirena București		
Total		225	(11)

International career
1970	Romania U23	1	(0)
1976	Romania	3	(0)

Managerial career
- Romania U16
- Romania U18
- * Club domestic league appearances and goals

Dumitru Manea (7 December 1948 – 31 May 2011) was a Romanian football left defender and manager.

== Club career ==
Manea was born on 7 December 1948 in Cernica, Romania. He started playing football at Steaua București, making his Divizia A debut on 26 September 1965 under coach Ilie Savu in a 5–1 victory against Siderurgistul Galați. In the 1967–68 season, he played five matches under coach Ștefan Kovács, as the club won the title. During the same season, he played and scored once in a 2–1 win over Austria Wien in the first round of the European Cup Winners' Cup. Manea played a total of seven matches and scored one goal for The Military Men in the European Cup Winners' Cup over the course of three editions. During his time with Steaua, he also won four Cupa României trophies, but without playing in any of the finals.

In 1971, Manea went to play for one season at Divizia B club Metalul Târgoviște. Afterwards, he returned to Divizia A football, joining Sportul Studențesc București. He helped the team reach the 1976 Balkans Cup final, where they were defeated 5–4 on aggregate by Dinamo Zagreb. Manea also made four appearances in the 1976–77 UEFA Cup, as his side eliminated Olympiacos in the first round, before suffering defeat to Schalke 04 in the following round. He made his last Divizia A appearance on 24 June 1979 in a 1–0 away loss to Olimpia Satu Mare, totaling 196 matches with five goals in the competition. Subsequently, Manea played for Mecanică Fină București and Sirena București, before retiring in 1982.

== International career ==
Manea played one match for Romania's under-23 national team in a 1–0 victory against Finland.

Manea played three games for Romania, making his debut under coach Ștefan Kovács in a 1–1 friendly draw against Czechoslovakia played at the 23 August stadium in Bucharest. His last appearance was in a 3–2 victory over Bulgaria in the second leg of the 1973–76 Balkan Cup final. However, the team did not win the trophy, as in the first leg they were defeated 1–0, thus losing on the away goals rule after the 3–3 aggregate draw.

== Coaching career ==
After he retired from playing football, Manea worked mainly at Sportul Studențesc București's youth center where he taught generations of players, including Costin Lazăr, Gheorghe Bucur, Ionuț Mazilu, George Galamaz, Eduard Stăncioiu and Cristian Irimia. He also coached Luceafărul București, where one of his players was Gheorghe Hagi. Furthermore, he served Romania's under-16 and under-18 national teams, where he had players such as Adrian Mutu, Cristian Chivu, Daniel Coman, Adrian Neaga, Dan Alexa and Emilian Dolha under his command.

== Personal life and death ==
His daughter, Oana, was a handball player.

Manea died on 31 May 2011 at the age of 62.

== Honours ==
Steaua București

- Divizia A: 1967–68
- Cupa României: 1966–67, 1968–69, 1969–70, 1970–71

Sportul Studențesc București

- Balkans Cup runner-up: 1976

Romania

- Balkan Cup runner-up: 1973–76
