= 1967–68 Regional Championship =

26th season of the Liga IV, the fourth tier of the Romanian football league

Liga IV
- Season: 1967–68

The 1967–68 Regional Championship, known as Intercounty championship, was the 26th season of the Liga IV, the fourth tier of the Romanian football league system. The promotion play-off was not held this season, due to the expansion of Divizia C from next season, from four series with 14 teams to eight series of 16 teams.

It was the last season organized by regions. Due to the territorial reorganization of the country, from regions to counties, the football activity was also reorganized, following that from the 1968–69 season each county to organized its own championship.

== Regional Championships ==
- Argeș (AG)
- Bacău (BC)
- Banat (BA)
- Brașov (BV)
- Bucharest Municipality (B)
- Bucharest Region (B)
- Cluj (CJ)
- Crișana (CR)
- Dobrogea (DO)
- Galați (GL)
- Hunedoara (HD)
- Iași (IS)
- Maramureș (MM)
- Mureș (MS)
- Oltenia (OL)
- Ploiești (PL)
- Suceava (SV)

== Championship standings ==
=== Argeș Region ===
Pos	Team	Pld	W	D	L	GF	GA	GD	Pts	Promotion or relegation
1	Unirea Drăgășani (C, P)	30	19	5	6	71	34	+37	43	Promotion to Divizia C
2	Muscelul Câmpulung (P)	30	15	8	7	55	28	+27	38	Promotion to Divizia C
3	Minerul Câmpulung (P)	30	17	3	10	57	31	+26	37	Promotion to Divizia C
4	CIL Râmnicu Vâlcea (P)	30	15	7	8	57	37	+20	37	Promotion to Divizia C
5	Avântul Curtea de Argeș	30	15	7	8	56	31	+25	37	
6	Metalul Pitești	30	13	7	10	55	34	+21	33	
7	Lotru Brezoi	30	14	5	11	48	42	+6	33	
8	Rapid Piatra-Olt	30	13	6	11	37	38	−1	32	
9	Recolta Stoicănești	30	13	5	12	44	46	−2	31	
10	Aluminiu Slatina	30	13	3	14	55	52	+3	29	
11	Forestierul Stâlpeni	30	13	2	15	53	51	+2	28	
12	Oltul Drăgănești-Olt	30	13	2	15	45	48	−3	28	
13	Voința Balta Sărată	30	9	8	13	40	75	−35	26	
14	Progresul Băiculești	30	9	4	17	37	46	−9	22	
15	Flacăra Horezu	30	8	2	20	39	72	−33	18	
16	Autobuzul Găești	30	3	0	27	15	99	−84	6	

Rules for classification: 1) points; 2) goal difference; 3) number of goals scored.
(C) Champions; (P) Promoted

=== Bacău Region ===
Pos	Team	Pld	W	D	L	GF	GA	GD	Pts	Promotion or relegation
1	Știința IP Bacău (C, P)	26	17	3	6	57	26	+31	37	Promotion to Divizia C
2	Cimentul Bicaz (P)	26	15	5	6	63	23	+40	35	Promotion to Divizia C
3	Progresul Gheorghiu-Dej (P)	26	16	3	7	51	22	+29	35	Promotion to Divizia C
4	Letea Bacău (P)	26	14	5	7	39	26	+13	33	Promotion to Divizia C
5	Victoria Bacău	26	13	6	7	44	21	+23	32	
6	Unirea Roman	26	14	1	11	36	27	+9	29	
7	Bradul Roznov	26	12	3	11	51	31	+20	27	
8	Petrolistul Dărmănești	26	12	3	11	41	45	−4	27	
9	Celuloza Piatra Neamț	26	11	5	10	31	43	−12	27	
10	Minerul Comănești	26	10	5	11	38	36	+2	25	
11	Constructorul Piatra Neamț	26	9	3	14	37	51	−14	21	
12	Gloria Zemeș	26	6	6	14	39	46	−7	18	
13	Locomotiva Adjud	26	8	1	17	25	66	−41	17	
14	Mecanizatorul Hemeiuși	26	0	1	25	9	87	−78	1	

Rules for classification: 1) points; 2) goal difference; 3) number of goals scored.
(C) Champions; (P) Promoted

=== Banat Region ===
North Series

Pos	Team	Pld	W	D	L	GF	GA	GD	Pts	Promotion or relegation
1	Șoimii Timișoara (C, P)	26	17	5	4	62	14	+48	39	Promotion to Divizia C
2	Furnirul Deta (P)	26	17	2	7	56	25	+31	36	Promotion to Divizia C
3	Voința Lugoj (P)	26	14	5	7	53	40	+13	33	Promotion to Divizia C
4	Progresul Timișoara	26	14	5	7	50	30	+20	33	
5	Laminorul Nădrag	26	11	7	8	45	34	+11	29	
6	Teba Arad	26	12	4	10	33	36	−3	28	
7	Gloria Arad	25	12	3	10	57	36	+21	27	
8	Recolta Jimbolia	25	11	4	10	35	34	+1	26	
9	Arta Textilă Timișoara	25	10	4	11	39	42	−3	24	
10	Progresul Ciacova	26	10	4	12	25	42	−17	24	
11	Luptătorul Lipova	24	8	3	13	24	43	−19	19	
12	Ceramica Jimbolia	24	7	4	13	31	44	−13	18	
13	Progresul Pecica	25	4	4	17	23	64	−41	12	
14	Checeana Checea	26	4	2	20	18	69	−51	10	

Rules for classification: 1) points; 2) goal difference; 3) number of goals scored.
(C) Champions; (P) Promoted

South Series

Pos	Team	Pld	W	D	L	GF	GA	GD	Pts	Promotion or relegation
1	Minerul Bocșa Montană (C, P)	24	16	4	4	66	24	+42	36	Promotion to Divizia C
2	Victoria Caransebeș (P)	24	16	4	4	46	25	+21	36	Promotion to Divizia C
3	Metalul Topleț (P)	24	16	2	6	66	23	+43	34	Promotion to Divizia C
4	Minerul Moldova Nouă	24	13	5	6	45	22	+23	31	
5	Metalul Bocșa	24	13	4	7	40	22	+18	30	
6	Metalul Oțelu Roșu	24	11	4	9	36	28	+8	26	
7	Foresta Zăvoi	24	7	7	10	23	32	−9	21	
8	Muncitorul Reșița	24	9	3	12	25	41	−16	21	
9	Electromotor Timișoara	24	7	6	11	34	33	+1	20	
10	Minerul Oravița	24	7	6	11	28	30	−2	20	
11	Nera Bozovici	24	6	4	14	20	56	−36	16	
12	Timișul Balta Sărată	24	6	3	15	18	66	−48	15	
13	Unirea Orșova	24	2	2	20	16	61	−45	6	

Rules for classification: 1) points; 2) goal difference; 3) number of goals scored.
(C) Champions; (P) Promoted

=== Brașov Region ===
Brașov Series

Pos	Team	Pld	W	D	L	GF	GA	GD	Pts	Promotion or relegation
1	Torpedo Zărnești (C, P)	22	13	7	2	46	13	+33	33	Promotion to Divizia C
2	Colorom Codlea (P)	22	13	6	3	38	13	+25	32	Promotion to Divizia C
3	Carpați Brașov (P)	22	9	9	4	28	16	+12	27	Promotion to Divizia C
4	Precizia Săcele	22	8	7	7	25	19	+6	23	
5	Politehnica Brașov	22	9	5	8	29	26	+3	23	
6	Celuloza Zărnești	22	8	6	8	27	26	+1	22	
7	Forestierul Târgu Secuiesc	22	10	2	10	28	36	−8	22	
8	Măgura Codlea	22	9	3	10	29	30	−1	21	
9	Textila Prejmer	22	7	3	12	32	35	−3	17	
10	Carpați Covasna	22	5	7	10	21	27	−6	17	
11	Hidromecanica Brașov	22	6	5	11	22	35	−13	17	
12	Ceramica Feldioara	22	4	2	16	20	69	−49	10	

Rules for classification: 1) points; 2) goal difference; 3) number of goals scored.
(C) Champions; (P) Promoted

Sibiu Series

Pos	Team	Pld	W	D	L	GF	GA	GD	Pts	Promotion or relegation
1	Progresul Sibiu (C, P)	22	13	5	4	56	24	+32	31	Promotion to Divizia C
2	Chimia Victoria (P)	22	13	4	5	48	26	+22	30	Promotion to Divizia C
3	Vitrometan Mediaș (P)	22	13	3	6	55	26	+29	29	Promotion to Divizia C
4	Textila Cisnădie	22	12	3	7	48	33	+15	27	
5	Sparta Mediaș	22	9	7	6	38	31	+7	25	
6	Carbosin Copșa Mică	22	11	3	8	43	36	+7	25	
7	Elastic Sibiu	22	9	6	7	25	27	−2	24	
8	Unirea Tălmaciu	22	10	2	10	44	36	+8	22	
9	Textila Mediaș	22	6	5	11	24	41	−17	17	
10	Record Mediaș	22	4	7	11	15	45	−30	15	
11	Metalul IO Sibiu	22	4	5	13	22	50	−28	13	
12	Flamura Roșie Sibiu	22	2	2	18	19	62	−43	6	

Rules for classification: 1) points; 2) goal difference; 3) number of goals scored.
(C) Champions; (P) Promoted

=== Bucharest Municipality ===
Pos	Team	Pld	W	D	L	GF	GA	GD	Pts	Qualification or relegation
1	Autobuzul București (P, Q)	30	20	4	6	69	29	+40	44	Promotion to Divizia C & qualification to championship final
2	Mașini Unelte București (P)	30	19	5	6	72	31	+41	43	Promotion to Divizia C
3	Abatorul București	30	18	5	7	51	21	+30	41 (Note: The match Chimia — Abatorul 0–10, from the last round, was homologated lost with 0–3 by both teams.)	
4	Laromet București	30	15	7	8	48	27	+21	37	
5	IPROFIL București	30	12	12	6	39	26	+13	36	
6	IOR București	30	15	5	10	44	32	+12	35	
7	Armata București	30	12	9	9	44	34	+10	33	
8	Granitul București	30	10	10	10	43	35	+8	30	
9	Sudorul București	30	10	10	10	36	42	−6	30	
10	ICSIM București	30	11	7	12	41	43	−2	29	
11	Avântul 9 Mai	29	11	5	13	45	59	−14	27	
12	Gloria București	29	9	6	14	32	54	−22	24	
13	Chimia București	30	6	9	15	30	50	−20	21	
14	Timpuri Noi București	30	6	6	18	27	60	−33	18	
15	Electromagnetica București	30	3	8	19	23	55	−32	14	
16	Semănătoarea București	30	3	8	19	27	77	−50	14	

Rules for classification: 1) points; 2) goal difference; 3) number of goals scored.
(P) Promoted; (Q) Qualified for the phase indicated
Notes:

Series II

Pos	Team	Pld	W	D	L	GF	GA	GD	Pts	Qualification or relegation
1	Voința București (P, Q)	30	20	6	4	69	16	+53	46	Promotion to Divizia C & qualification to championship final
2	Sirena București (P)	30	17	8	5	45	21	+24	42	Promotion to Divizia C
3	Dinamo Obor București	30	14	12	4	50	16	+34	40	
4	Vâscoza București	29	16	6	7	57	26	+31	38	
5	Acumulatorul București	30	12	9	9	40	28	+12	33	
6	Automatica București	30	11	10	9	35	27	+8	32	
7	Constructorul București	30	12	8	10	36	32	+4	32	
8	Vulcan București	30	11	10	9	31	28	+3	32	
9	Luxor București	30	11	9	10	39	37	+2	31	
10	Bere Rahova	30	10	10	10	32	31	+1	30	
11	Quadrat București	30	9	11	10	36	37	−1	29	
12	CFR BTA București	29	7	12	10	20	31	−11	26	
13	Dacia București	20	6	9	5	25	60	−35	21	
14	Confecția București	30	5	8	17	20	52	−32	18	
15	Spic de Grâu București	29	6	5	18	15	63	−48	17	
16	ITB București	30	2	7	21	16	61	−45	11	

Rules for classification: 1) points; 2) goal difference; 3) number of goals scored.
(P) Promoted; (Q) Qualified for the phase indicated

Championship final

The match was played on 6 July 1968 at Timpuri Noi Stadium in Bucharest.

Team 1	Score	Team 2
Autobuzul București	0–1	Voința București

Voința București won the Bucharest Municipal Championship.

=== Bucharest Region ===
East Series

Pos	Team	Pld	W	D	L	GF	GA	GD	Pts	Promotion or relegation
1	Celuloza Călărași (C, P)	24	17	0	7	66	18	+48	34	Promotion to Divizia C
2	Cooperatorul Urziceni (P)	24	14	6	4	37	19	+18	34	Promotion to Divizia C
3	Unirea Mănăstirea (P)	24	14	4	6	46	24	+22	32	Promotion to Divizia C
4	ICAB Arcuda	24	14	2	8	43	30	+13	30	
5	Înainte Modelu	24	13	3	8	37	21	+16	29	
6	Voința Slobozia	24	10	3	11	32	37	−5	23	
7	Unirea Slobozia Moară	24	9	4	11	41	41	0	22	
8	Victoria Lehliu	24	7	6	11	28	39	−11	20	
9	Gloria Fundeni	24	7	5	12	32	40	−8	19	
10	ASMC Căzănești	24	8	2	14	30	50	−20	18	
11	Steaua Lehliu	24	9	0	15	32	61	−29	18	
12	DRTA București	24	7	3	14	30	59	−29	17	
13	Locomotiva Fetești	24	4	6	14	23	44	−21	14	

Rules for classification: 1) points; 2) goal difference; 3) number of goals scored.
(C) Champions; (P) Promoted

West Series

Pos	Team	Pld	W	D	L	GF	GA	GD	Pts	Promotion or relegation
1	Comerțul Alexandria (C, P)	22	14	3	5	82	18	+64	31	Promotion to Divizia C
2	Olimpia Giurgiu (P)	22	13	5	4	53	17	+36	31	Promotion to Divizia C
3	Flacăra Videle (P)	22	11	7	4	47	22	+25	29	Promotion to Divizia C
4	Sporting Roșiori	22	12	5	5	35	19	+16	29	
5	Dunărea Zimnicea	22	11	2	9	34	32	+2	24	
6	Electrica Turnu Măgurele	22	8	6	8	31	40	−9	22	
7	CFR Roșiori	22	8	5	9	35	41	−6	21	
8	Teleorman Troianu	22	8	5	9	26	37	−11	21	
9	Recolta Brezoaele	22	8	3	11	41	67	−26	19	
10	Victoria Alexandria	22	3	5	14	24	58	−34	11	
11	Aripile CFR Titu	22	3	4	15	15	52	−37	10	
12	Victoria Turnu Măgurele	22	3	4	15	11	49	−38	10	

Rules for classification: 1) points; 2) goal difference; 3) number of goals scored.
(C) Champions; (P) Promoted

=== Cluj Region ===
Someș Series

Pos	Team	Pld	W	D	L	GF	GA	GD	Pts	Qualification or relegation
1	Gloria Bistrița (C, P)	20	16	2	2	81	17	+64	34	Promotion to Divizia C
2	CIL Gherla (P)	20	15	1	4	53	15	+38	31	Promotion to Divizia C
3	Tehnofrig Cluj-Napoca (P)	20	13	3	4	53	16	+37	29	Promotion to Divizia C
4	Progresul Năsăud	20	12	4	4	40	17	+23	28	
5	Motorul IRA Cluj-Napoca	20	9	7	4	51	26	+25	25	
6	Steaua Roșie Zalău	20	8	3	9	32	28	+4	19	
7	Vulturul Mintiu Gherlii	20	9	1	10	47	44	+3	19	
8	Rapid Jibou	20	5	3	12	29	50	−21	13	
9	Victoria Uriu	20	5	2	13	22	56	−34	12	
10	Hârtia Prundu Bârgăului	20	1	3	16	9	61	−52	5	
11	Someșul Beclean	20	1	3	16	13	100	−87	5	
12	Progresul Răscruci (Note: Progresul Răscruci withdrew in the first part of the season and all its results were canceled.) (D)	0	0	0	0	0	0	0	0	Withdrew

Rules for classification: 1) Points; 2) Goal difference; 3) Number of goals scored.
(C) Champions; (D) Disqualified; (P) Promoted
Notes:

Mureș Series

Pos	Team	Pld	W	D	L	GF	GA	GD	Pts	Qualification or relegation
1	Arieșul Turda (C, P)	22	17	3	2	66	12	+54	37	Promotion to Divizia C
2	Minerul Baia de Arieș (P)	22	15	5	2	47	23	+24	35	Promotion to Divizia C
3	Arieșul Câmpia Turzii (P)	22	12	5	5	38	17	+21	29	Promotion to Divizia C
4	Cimentul Turda	22	8	8	6	32	21	+11	24	
5	Locomotiva 16 Februarie Cluj	22	8	4	10	43	39	+4	20	
6	Vlădeasa Huedin	22	9	2	11	36	47	−11	20	
7	Unirea Cluj	22	8	3	11	30	28	+2	19	
8	Politehnica Cluj	22	8	3	11	27	45	−18	19	
9	Olimpia Aiud	22	6	5	11	21	30	−9	17	
10	Arieșul Câmpeni	22	6	3	13	23	41	−18	15	
11	Moții Abrud	22	7	1	14	23	53	−30	15	
12	Minerul Roșia Montană	22	4	4	14	15	51	−36	12	

Rules for classification: 1) Points; 2) Goal difference; 3) Number of goals scored.
(C) Champions; (P) Promoted

=== Crișana Region ===
North Series

Pos	Team	Pld	W	D	L	GF	GA	GD	Pts	Qualification or relegation
1	Dinamo Oradea (C, P)	22	16	5	1	86	12	+74	37	Promotion to Divizia C
2	Bihoreana Marghita (P)	22	15	5	2	70	15	+55	35	Promotion to Divizia C
3	Voința Oradea	22	14	6	2	73	22	+51	34	
4	Recolta Valea lui Mihai	22	10	7	5	47	21	+26	27	
5	Minerul Sărmășag	22	11	5	6	54	34	+20	27	
6	Minerul Voivozi	22	11	3	8	48	31	+17	25	
7	Stăruința Săcuieni	22	10	2	10	38	43	−5	22	
8	Măgura Șimleu Silvaniei	22	8	2	12	40	53	−13	18	
9	Minerul Ip	22	5	3	14	27	41	−14	13	
10	Voința Șimian	22	5	3	14	38	68	−30	13	
11	Recolta Diosig	22	4	1	17	25	92	−67	9	
12	Tractorul Nușfalău	22	1	2	19	10	124	−114	4	

Rules for classification: 1) Points; 2) Goal difference; 3) Number of goals scored.
(C) Champions; (P) Promoted

South Series

Pos	Team	Pld	W	D	L	GF	GA	GD	Pts	Qualification or relegation
1	Știința Oradea (C, P)	22	16	3	3	53	12	+41	35	Promotion to Divizia C
2	Unirea Oradea (P)	22	14	6	2	54	14	+40	34	Promotion to Divizia C
3	Crișana Sebiș	22	13	3	6	40	19	+21	29	
4	Victoria Ineu	22	10	6	6	40	26	+14	26	
5	Victoria Chișineu-Criș	22	12	1	9	30	24	+6	25	
6	Foresta Beliu	22	11	1	10	37	37	0	23	
7	Foresta Tileagd	22	10	1	11	41	36	+5	21	
8	Crișul Ineu	22	8	5	9	25	25	0	21	
9	Recolta Buteni	22	8	3	11	26	48	−22	19	
10	Unirea Sântana	22	8	2	12	25	38	−13	18	
11	Biharea Vașcău	22	3	1	18	13	54	−41	7	
12	Voința Inand	22	2	0	20	18	69	−51	4	

Rules for classification: 1) Points; 2) Goal difference; 3) Number of goals scored.
(C) Champions; (P) Promoted

=== Dobrogea Region ===
Pos	Team	Pld	W	D	L	GF	GA	GD	Pts	Qualification or relegation
1	Marina Mangalia (C, P)	26	19	3	4	59	18	+41	41	Promotion to Divizia C
2	Cimentul Medgidia (P)	26	15	7	4	53	16	+37	37	Promotion to Divizia C
3	Ideal Cernavodă (P)	26	14	7	5	55	19	+36	35	Promotion to Divizia C
4	ITC Constanța (P)	26	15	5	6	52	20	+32	35	Promotion to Divizia C
5	CFR Constanța	26	13	5	8	44	38	+6	31	
6	Victoria Saligny	26	10	9	7	33	28	+5	29	
7	Metalul Mangalia	26	12	3	11	42	33	+9	27	
8	Petrolul Constanța	26	8	8	10	31	35	−4	24	
9	Știința Constanța	26	8	8	10	29	38	−9	24	
10	CFR Medgidia	26	8	7	11	35	36	−1	23	
11	Recolta Negru Vodă	26	9	1	16	40	73	−33	19	
12	USAS Năvodari	26	6	5	15	29	57	−28	17	
13	Celuloza Constanța	26	5	6	15	22	56	−34	16	
14	Unirea Murfatlar	26	2	2	22	8	65	−57	6	

Rules for classification: 1) Points; 2) Goal difference; 3) Number of goals scored.
(C) Champions; (P) Promoted

=== Galați Region ===
Pos	Team	Pld	W	D	L	GF	GA	GD	Pts	Promotion or relegation
1	Chimica Mărășești (C, P)	30	23	3	4	72	16	+56	49	Promotion to Divizia C
2	Metalul Brăila (P)	30	22	3	5	84	33	+51	47	Promotion to Divizia C
3	Victoria Tecuci (P)	30	18	5	7	66	31	+35	41	Promotion to Divizia C
4	Flamura Roșie Tecuci (P)	30	18	3	9	66	30	+36	39	Promotion to Divizia C
5	CFR Brăila	30	14	5	11	45	30	+15	33	
6	Tractorul Viziru	30	14	5	11	45	35	+10	33	
7	Dunărea Brăila	30	13	7	10	51	41	+10	33	
8	Tractorul Galați	30	15	3	12	58	55	+3	33	
9	Foresta Gugești	30	12	7	11	58	51	+7	31	
10	Trefilorul Galați	30	12	4	14	47	59	−12	28	
11	Viitorul Rușețu	30	14	0	16	49	64	−15	28	
12	Laminorul Brăila	30	10	7	13	41	41	0	27	
13	Unirea ITO Galați	30	7	10	13	34	60	−26	24	
14	Automobilul Focșani	30	9	4	17	33	61	−28	22	
15	Flacăra Odobești	30	2	1	27	13	82	−69	5	
16	Recolta Brateș	30	2	1	27	11	87	−76	5	

Rules for classification: 1) points; 2) goal difference; 3) number of goals scored.
(C) Champions; (P) Promoted

=== Hunedoara Region ===
Valea Jiului Series

Pos	Team	Pld	W	D	L	GF	GA	GD	Pts	Qualification or relegation
1	Știința Petroșani (C, P)	22	17	2	3	50	13	+37	36	Promotion to Divizia C
2	Minerul Ghelari (P)	22	13	3	6	50	22	+28	29	Promotion to Divizia C
3	Minerul Teliuc	22	12	2	8	49	26	+23	26	
4	Minerul Aninoasa	22	9	7	6	33	26	+7	25	
5	Minerul Uricani	22	10	3	9	31	41	−10	23	
6	Parângul Lonea	22	9	4	9	38	32	+6	22	
7	Construtorul Lupeni	22	8	6	8	45	42	+3	22	
8	Preparatorul Petrila	22	7	6	9	16	30	−14	20	
9	Constructorul Hunedoara	22	7	3	12	24	32	−8	17	
10	Minerul Vulcan	22	7	3	12	30	51	−21	17	
11	IGO Hunedoara	22	6	4	12	17	34	−17	16	
12	Abatorul Hațeg	22	5	1	16	19	53	−34	11	

Rules for classification: 1) Points; 2) Goal difference; 3) Number of goals scored.
(C) Champions; (P) Promoted

Valea Mureșului Series

Pos	Team	Pld	W	D	L	GF	GA	GD	Pts	Qualification or relegation
1	Aurul Zlatna (C, P)	22	17	2	3	62	14	+48	36	Promotion to Divizia C
2	Aurul Brad (P)	22	15	3	4	72	18	+54	33	Promotion to Divizia C
3	Dacia Orăștie	22	15	2	5	56	17	+39	32	
4	Textila Sebeș	22	15	0	7	65	29	+36	30	
5	CFR Simeria	22	12	4	6	47	25	+22	28	
6	Mecanica Cugir	22	13	2	7	50	31	+19	28	
7	Unirea Alba Iulia	22	8	5	9	38	40	−2	21	
8	IRTA Brad	22	7	2	13	34	62	−28	16	
9	Energia Deva	22	6	2	14	23	58	−35	14	
10	CFR Teiuș	22	6	1	15	45	63	−18	13	
11	Șurianul Săsciori	22	3	1	18	12	77	−65	7	
12	Aurul Certej	22	2	0	20	11	97	−86	4	

Rules for classification: 1) Points; 2) Goal difference; 3) Number of goals scored.
(C) Champions; (P) Promoted

=== Iași Region ===
Series I (Iași)

Pos	Team	Pld	W	D	L	GF	GA	GD	Pts	Qualification or relegation
1	Foresta Ciurea (C, P)	18	14	3	1	62	15	+47	31	Promotion to Divizia C
2	Penicilina Iași (P)	18	14	1	3	54	19	+35	29	Promotion to Divizia C
3	Nicolina Iași (P)	18	12	2	4	59	30	+29	26	Promotion to Divizia C
4	Politehnica Iași II	17	11	1	5	39	17	+22	23	
5	AS Politehnica Iași	17	9	2	6	38	29	+9	20	
6	CFR Pașcani II	18	8	1	9	44	41	+3	17	
7	Instalatorul Iași	18	7	1	10	26	48	−22	15	
8	DTA Hârlău	16	3	2	11	19	52	−33	8	
9	Universitatea Iași	17	2	1	14	13	47	−34	5	
10	Voința Bivolari	17	0	0	17	6	59	−53	0	

Rules for classification: 1) Points; 2) Goal difference; 3) Number of goals scored.
(C) Champions; (P) Promoted

Series II (Vaslui)

Pos	Team	Pld	W	D	L	GF	GA	GD	Pts	Qualification or relegation
1	Unirea Negrești (C, P)	14	12	0	2	35	8	+27	24	Promotion to Divizia C
2	Strungul Bârlad (P)	14	11	0	3	57	12	+45	22	Promotion to Divizia C
3	Hușana Huși	14	11	0	3	27	14	+13	22	
4	IEIL Vaslui	14	9	1	4	37	19	+18	19	
5	Constructorul Bârlad	14	4	0	10	16	46	−30	8	
6	Recolta Dragalina	14	3	1	10	12	39	−27	7	
7	Recolta Laza	14	2	1	11	20	40	−20	5	
8	Flacăra Murgeni	14	2	1	11	21	47	−26	5	

Rules for classification: 1) Points; 2) Goal difference; 3) Number of goals scored.
(C) Champions; (P) Promoted

=== Mureș Region ===
Series I

Pos	Team	Pld	W	D	L	GF	GA	GD	Pts	Qualification or relegation
1	Mureșul Luduș (Q, P)	22	13	5	4	38	33	+5	31	Promotion to Divizia C & qualification to championship final
2	Voința Târnăveni (Q, P)	22	13	4	5	38	29	+9	30	Promotion to Divizia C & qualification to third place match
3	Avântul Reghin (P)	22	10	9	3	51	24	+27	29	Promotion to Divizia C
4	Unirea Târnăveni	22	14	0	8	55	26	+29	28	
5	Voința Reghin	22	9	5	8	39	31	+8	23	
6	Tractorul Sărmașu	22	10	2	10	41	37	+4	22	
7	Ciocanul Târgu Mureș	22	9	4	9	32	36	−4	22	
8	Oțelul Târgu Mureș	22	6	6	10	30	43	−13	18	
9	Voința Miercurea Nirajului	22	8	2	12	23	44	−21	18	
10	Stăruința Târgu Mureș	22	7	2	13	28	39	−11	16	
11	Energia Iernut	22	6	2	14	24	38	−14	14	
12	Energia Fântânele	22	6	1	15	31	50	−19	13	

Rules for classification: 1) Points; 2) Goal difference; 3) Number of goals scored.
(P) Promoted; (Q) Qualified for the phase indicated

Series II

Pos	Team	Pld	W	D	L	GF	GA	GD	Pts	Promotion or relegation
1	Lemnarul Odorheiu Secuiesc (Q, P)	22	18	3	1	72	15	+57	39	Promotion to Divizia C & qualification to championship final
2	Minerul Bălan (Q, P)	22	12	4	6	43	22	+21	28	Promotion to Divizia C & qualification to third place match
3	Unirea Cristuru Secuiesc (P)	22	11	6	5	50	30	+20	28	Promotion to Divizia C
4	Lemnarul Târgu Mureș	22	11	5	6	44	24	+20	27	
5	Viitorul Târgu Mureș	22	10	3	9	28	31	−3	23	
6	Metalul Vlăhița	22	8	4	10	24	42	−18	20	
7	Gloria Târgu Mureș	22	7	5	10	23	26	−3	19	
8	Viitorul Gheorgheni	22	7	4	11	31	56	−25	18	
9	Apemin Borsec	22	6	5	11	23	40	−17	17	
10	Mureșul Toplița	22	6	4	12	26	40	−14	16	
11	Flamura Roșie Sânsimion	22	5	6	11	33	51	−18	16	
12	Minerul Miercurea Ciuc	22	5	3	14	18	38	−20	13	

Rules for classification: 1) Points; 2) Goal difference; 3) Number of goals scored.
(P) Promoted; (Q) Qualified for the phase indicated

Third place match

The match was played on 9 June 1968 on neutral ground at Sovata.

Team 1	Score	Team 2
Voința Târnăveni	2–1 (a.e.t.)	Minerul Bălan

Championship final

The matches were played on 9 and 16 June 1968.

Team 1	Agg.	Team 2	1st leg	2nd leg
Lemnarul Odorheiu Secuiesc	7–1	Mureșul Luduș	5–0	2–1

Lemnarul Odorheiu Secuiesc won the Mureș Regional Championship.

=== Oltenia Region ===
Series I

Pos	Team	Pld	W	D	L	GF	GA	GD	Pts	Qualification or relegation
1	Steagul Roșu Plenița (C, P)	22	16	3	3	57	21	+36	35	Promotion to Divizia C
2	Dunărea Calafat (P)	22	16	1	5	54	26	+28	33	Promotion to Divizia C
3	Progresul Balș (P)	22	15	3	4	54	38	+16	33	Promotion to Divizia C
4	Armata Craiova	22	11	6	5	44	21	+23	28	
5	Unirea Craiova	22	10	4	8	41	24	+17	24	
6	Metalul Craiova	22	10	3	9	36	34	+2	23	
7	Răsăritul Caracal	22	9	2	11	40	43	−3	20	
8	Gloria Băilești	22	9	2	11	40	55	−15	20	
9	Recolta Urzicuța	22	9	1	12	29	46	−17	19	
10	Progresul Craiova	22	8	2	12	34	38	−4	18	
11	Recolta Dăbuleni	22	2	1	19	14	40	−26	5	
12	Unirea Amărăști	22	1	2	19	5	58	−53	4	

Rules for classification: 1) Points; 2) Goal difference; 3) Number of goals scored.
(C) Champions; (P) Promoted

Series II

Pos	Team	Pld	W	D	L	GF	GA	GD	Pts	Qualification or relegation
1	Autorapid Craiova (C, P)	22	15	5	2	64	16	+48	35	Promotion to Divizia C
2	Minerul Motru (P)	22	15	2	5	65	14	+51	32	Promotion to Divizia C
3	Energia Drobeta-Turnu Severin (P)	22	14	4	4	51	27	+24	32	Promotion to Divizia C
4	Metalurgistul Sadu	22	13	4	5	72	27	+45	30	
5	SMT Șimian	22	11	7	4	35	19	+16	29	
6	Electrica Craiova	22	8	6	8	41	26	+15	22	
7	Progresul Cârcea	22	10	2	10	38	53	−15	22	
8	CIL Târgu Jiu	22	9	3	10	45	57	−12	21	
9	Constructorul Craiova	22	6	1	15	30	47	−17	13	
10	Gilortul Târgu Cărbunești	22	5	3	14	25	63	−38	13	
11	Minerul Rovinari	22	3	3	16	20	66	−46	9	
12	Petrolul Țicleni	22	3	0	19	21	92	−71	6	

Rules for classification: 1) Points; 2) Goal difference; 3) Number of goals scored.
(C) Champions; (P) Promoted

=== Ploiești Region ===
East Series

Pos	Team	Pld	W	D	L	GF	GA	GD	Pts	Qualification or relegation
1	Prahova Ploiești (Q, P)	22	15	5	2	58	14	+44	35	Promotion to Divizia C & qualification to championship final
2	Petrolul Berca (P)	22	14	2	6	48	23	+25	30	Promotion to Divizia C
3	Petrolistul Boldești (P)	22	13	3	6	34	25	+9	29	Promotion to Divizia C
4	Vagonul Ploiești	22	9	5	8	29	25	+4	23	
5	Viitorul Slănic	22	8	6	8	38	32	+6	22	
6	Rafinăria Teleajen	22	8	6	8	18	20	−2	22	
7	Foresta Nehoiu	22	8	5	9	33	40	−7	21	
8	Progresul Râmnicu Sărat	22	8	5	9	30	40	−10	21	
9	Feroemail Ploiești	22	7	6	9	23	32	−9	20	
10	Carotajul Ploiești	22	8	3	11	30	31	−1	19	
11	Chimistul Valea Călugărească	22	8	2	12	20	34	−14	18	
12	Armata Ploiești	22	1	2	19	7	52	−45	4	

Rules for classification: 1) points; 2) goal difference; 3) number of goals scored.
(P) Promoted; (Q) Qualified for the phase indicated

West Series

Pos	Team	Pld	W	D	L	GF	GA	GD	Pts	Qualification or relegation
1	Caraimanul Bușteni (Q, P)	22	15	3	4	57	23	+34	33	Promotion to Divizia C & qualification to championship final
2	IRA Câmpina (P)	22	15	2	5	44	12	+32	32	Promotion to Divizia C
3	Carpați Sinaia (P)	22	14	2	6	47	20	+27	30	Promotion to Divizia C
4	Rafinăria Câmpina	22	11	7	4	35	23	+12	29	
5	Electrica Câmpina	22	9	7	6	39	29	+10	25	
6	Petrolul Băicoi	22	10	4	8	26	24	+2	24	
7	Victoria Florești	22	6	9	7	24	25	−1	21	
8	Victoria Moreni	22	6	6	10	26	35	−9	18	
9	Muncitorul Schela Mare	22	6	6	10	27	42	−15	18	
10	Bucegi Pucioasa	22	3	6	13	19	42	−23	12	
11	Dinamo Caragiale	22	3	6	13	18	48	−30	12	
12	Petrolul Târgoviște	22	3	4	15	20	59	−39	10	

Rules for classification: 1) points; 2) goal difference; 3) number of goals scored.
(P) Promoted; (Q) Qualified for the phase indicated

Championship final

The matches were played on 2 and 8 June 1968.

Team 1	Agg.	Team 2	1st leg	2nd leg
Caraimanul Bușteni	2–5	Prahova Ploiești	1–1	1–4

Prahova Ploiești won the Ploiești Regional Championship.

=== Suceava Region ===
Pos	Team	Pld	W	D	L	GF	GA	GD	Pts	Qualification or relegation
1	Minerul Gura Humorului (C, P)	26	18	2	6	56	26	+30	38	Promotion to Divizia C
2	Viitorul Botoșani (P)	26	18	1	7	71	27	+44	37	Promotion to Divizia C
3	Rarăul Cîmpulung Moldovenesc (P)	26	18	1	7	67	29	+38	37	Promotion to Divizia C
4	Fulgerul Dorohoi (P)	26	14	5	7	72	44	+28	33	Promotion to Divizia C
5	Unirea Siret	26	15	2	9	59	35	+24	32	
6	Foresta Moldovița	26	15	2	9	72	40	+32	32	
7	Avântul Fălticeni	26	13	3	10	51	34	+17	29	
8	CFR Suceava	26	11	3	12	42	72	−30	25	
9	Chimia Bradul Vama	26	11	0	15	63	55	+8	22	
10	Filatura Fălticeni	26	7	5	14	42	53	−11	19	
11	Minobradul Broșteni	26	9	0	17	38	79	−41	18	
12	Siretul Dolhasca	26	7	3	16	39	81	−42	17	
13	Tractorul Săveni	26	5	2	19	19	60	−41	12	
14	IPROFIL Rădăuți	26	4	3	19	20	76	−56	11	

Rules for classification: 1) points; 2) goal difference; 3) number of goals scored.
(C) Champions; (P) Promoted

== See also ==
- 1967–68 Divizia A
- 1967–68 Divizia B
- 1967–68 Cupa României
