= Stadionul Forex =

Former Romanian stadium

Forex Stadium
- Stadionul Forex
- Interactive map of Forex Stadium
- Former names: Stadionul IAR (1940–1950); Stadionul Tractorul (1950–2003)
- Address: Str. 13 Decembrie
- Location: Brașov, Romania
- Coordinates: 45°39′59.6″N 25°36′39.1″E
- Capacity: 5,000
- Surface: Grass

Construction
- Opened: 1940
- Closed: 2017
- Demolished: 2020

Tenants
- Tractorul Brașov (1940–2003); Forex Brașov (2003–2011)

Forex Stadium was a multi-use stadium in Braşov, Romania. It was used mostly for football matches and was the home ground of Tractorul Braşov and Forex Brașov. Forex Stadium had a main stand and a secondary one with a total capacity of 5,000 people.

Forex Stadium was opened in 1940 under the name of IAR Stadium, but at the beginnings of the 1950s it was renamed again, now as Tractorul Stadium, after Uzina Tractorul Brașov (UTB), Romania's main tractors factory and the new owner of the ground. Between 1940 and 2003 it was the home ground of Tractorul Brașov, the in 2003 Tractorul merged with Forex Brașov, the owner of Forex, local businessman Nicolae Țucunel bought the ground for 70k Euro, then in 2011 Forex was disbanded, in 2017 the main stand was demolished and three years later the whole stadium was redevolped as a hypermarket.
