= Tractorul Brașov =

Defunct Romanian football club

- Full name: Fotbal Club Tractorul Brașov
- Short name: Tractorul
- Founded: 1927
- Dissolved: 2006
- Ground: Tractorul
- Capacity: 5,000
Home colours	Away colours

Fotbal Club Tractorul Brașov, commonly known as Tractorul Brașov, was a Romanian football club based in Brașov, Brașov County. It was founded in 1927 as IAR Brașov, the team of the Industria Aeronautică Română aircraft factory, and adopted the Tractorul name after the factory was converted to tractor production after the Second World War.

The club spent most of its history in the Romanian second and third divisions. It won a Divizia B series in 1935–36 and three Divizia C series. Tractorul ceased senior activity in 2006 after giving up its newly obtained Liga II place for financial reasons.

== History ==
=== IAR Brașov (1927–1948) ===
The club was founded in 1927 as IAR Brașov, representing the workers of Industria Aeronautică Română.

IAR entered Divizia B in 1935–36 and won Series IV in its first season, with nine wins, two draws and three defeats. It subsequently finished last in the promotion tournament for Divizia A.

In 1937, negotiations were held over a possible merger with ACFR Brașov under the name FC Brașov, but the merger did not take place. IAR subsequently withdrew from professional football and continued in the Brașov district championship.

After the Second World War, the club returned to Divizia B.

=== Tractorul Brașov (1948–1982) ===
In 1948, the IAR factory became Uzina Tractorul Brașov and the football team was renamed Tractorul Brașov.

After several seasons in regional football, Tractorul returned to Divizia B in 1953. Its best post-war second-tier result came in 1955, when it finished third in Series I.

Angelo Niculescu coached the club between 1957 and 1959.

Tractorul was relegated to Divizia C in 1964–65. The club finished second in its Divizia C series in 1965–66, 1966–67 and 1968–69 before winning the series in 1969–70.

A second Divizia C title followed in 1972–73, bringing Tractorul back to Divizia B. The club remained in the second tier until its relegation in 1981–82.

=== 1982–2002 ===
Tractorul finished second in Divizia C in 1982–83 and reached the Round of 16 of the 1982–83 Cupa României.

The club won Series XII of 1983–84 and returned to Divizia B.

With the exception of the 1989–90 season, Tractorul spent most of the following period in the second division. During the 1990s, it regularly finished in the upper half of its series.

The club was also known for developing players who later competed at a higher level, including Vasile Maftei, Gabriel Tamaș, Florin Bratu, Andrei Mărgăritescu and Daniel Isăilă.

After the 2001–02 season, financial problems led Tractorul to give up its second-division place and continue in Divizia C.

=== Final years (2002–2006) ===
Tractorul continued independently in Divizia C after 2002. The club was separate from Forex Brașov, which was founded in 2002 and later used part of the former Tractorul sports complex.

In 2005–06, Tractorul finished second in Series VIII behind FC Ghimbav. As Ghimbav was not eligible for promotion, Tractorul obtained a place in the second division.

The club was unable to finance another season in the second tier and relinquished its place in June 2006. Tractorul did not enter the following national championship and its senior team ceased activity.

== Chronology of names ==
Name	Period
Industria Aeronautică Română Brașov (IAR Brașov)	1927–1948
Tractorul Brașov	1948–1950
Metalul Tractorul Orașul Stalin	1950–1956
Energia Tractorul Orașul Stalin	1957–1958
Tractorul Orașul Stalin	1958–1960
Tractorul Brașov	1960–2006

== Stadium ==
Tractorul played at the Tractorul Stadium in northern Brașov, next to the industrial complex. The ground dated from the IAR period and was later repaired after being damaged during the Allied bombing of Brașov in 1944.

Part of the sports complex was later acquired by interests associated with Forex Brașov, and the ground became known as the Forex Stadium. The former grandstand was subsequently demolished.

== Honours ==
Divizia B

- Series winners (1): 1935–36

Divizia C

- Winners (3): 1969–70, 1972–73, 1983–84
- Runners-up (6): 1965–66, 1966–67, 1968–69, 1971–72, 1982–83, 2005–06

== Notable former players ==
- (Romania) Iuliu Bodola
- (Romania) Florin Bratu
- (Romania) Daniel Isăilă
- (Romania) Vasile Maftei
- (Romania) Andrei Mărgăritescu
- (Romania) Gabriel Tamaș

== Former managers ==
- (Romania) Angelo Niculescu (1957–1959)
- (Romania) Silviu Ploeșteanu (1968–1969)
- (Romania) Dragoș Cojocaru (1973–1975)
- (Romania) Nicolae Oaidă (1978–1979)
- (Romania) Gabriel Stan (1982–1983)
- (Romania) Eugen Moldovan (1998–1999)
- (Romania) Aurel Țicleanu (2001–2002)
- (Romania) Dorel Purdea (2004)
- (Romania) Bondoc Ionescu-Crum

== League history ==
Season	Tier	Division	Place	Notes
2005–06	3	Divizia C (Series VIII)	2nd	Club dissolved after the season
2004–05	3	Divizia C (Series VIII)	4th	
2003–04	3	Divizia C (Series IV)	4th	
2002–03	3	Divizia C (Series II)	9th	
2001–02	2	Divizia B (Series I)	8th (R)	Withdrew after the season and ceded its Divizia B place
2000–01	2	Divizia B (Series I)	9th	
1999–00	2	Divizia B (Series I)	5th	
1998–99	2	Divizia B (Series I)	14th	
1997–98	2	Divizia B (Series I)	5th	
1996–97	2	Divizia B (Series I)	11th	
1995–96	2	Divizia B (Series I)	5th	
1994–95	2	Divizia B (Series II)	4th	
1993–94	2	Divizia B (Series II)	4th	
1992–93	2	Divizia B (Series II)	7th	
1991–92	2	Divizia B (Series III)	5th	
1990–91	2	Divizia B (Series II)	6th	
1989–90	2	Divizia B (Series II)	15th	Survived relegation play-off
1988–89	2	Divizia B (Series II)	8th	
1987–88	2	Divizia B (Series II)	5th	
1986–87	2	Divizia B (Series II)	9th	
1985–86	2	Divizia B (Series II)	10th	
1984–85	2	Divizia B (Series II)	4th	
1983–84	3	Divizia C (Series XII)	1st (C, P)	Promoted
1982–83	3	Divizia C (Series XII)	2nd	
1981–82	2	Divizia B (Series II)	17th (R)	Relegated
1980–81	2	Divizia B (Series II)	11th	
1979–80	2	Divizia B (Series I)	13th	
1978–79	2	Divizia B (Series I)	14th	
1977–78	2	Divizia B (Series I)	14th	
1976–77	2	Divizia B (Series II)	14th	
1975–76	2	Divizia B (Series II)	7th	

Season	Tier	Division	Place	Notes
1974–75	2	Divizia B (Series II)	11th	
1973–74	2	Divizia B (Series II)	9th	
1972–73	3	Divizia C (Series XII)	1st (C, P)	Promoted
1971–72	3	Divizia C (Series XII)	2nd	
1970–71	3	Divizia C (Series VIII)	3rd	
1969–70	3	Divizia C (Series VIII)	1st (C)	Lost promotion play-off
1968–69	3	Divizia C (Series VIII)	2nd	
1967–68	3	Divizia C (West Series)	8th	
1966–67	3	Divizia C (West Series)	2nd	
1965–66	3	Divizia C (South Series)	2nd	
1964–65	2	Divizia B (Series I)	13th (R)	Relegated
1963–64	2	Divizia B (Series I)	7th	
1962–63	2	Divizia B (Series II)	10th	
1961–62	2	Divizia B (Series II)	11th	
1960–61	2	Divizia B (Series II)	5th	
1959–60	2	Divizia B (Series III)	12th	
1958–59	2	Divizia B (Series I)	8th	
1957–58	2	Divizia B (Series I)	11th	
1957	2	Cupa Primăverii (Series II)	4th	
1956	2	Divizia B (Series I)	7th	
1955	2	Divizia B (Series I)	3rd	
1954	2	Divizia B (Series I)	7th	
1953	3	Regional Championship (Stalin)	1st (C, P)	Promoted
1949–52	Competed in the regional championship			
1948–49	3	Divizia C	—	Competition dissolved during the season
1947–48	2	Divizia B (Series II)	12th (R)	Relegated
1946–47	2	Divizia B (Series II)	8th	
1937–46	Competed in regional championships; national leagues suspended during World War II			
1936–37	2	Divizia B (East Series)	8th	
1935–36	2	Divizia B (Series IV)	1st (C)	Lost promotion play-off
1927–35	Competed in regional championships			

== See also ==
- Colțea Brașov
- Brașovia Brașov
- FC Brașov
- CFR Brașov
- Corona Brașov
