= FC Drobeta-Turnu Severin =

- Full name: Fotbal Club Drobeta-Turnu Severin
- Nicknames: Severinenii (The People from Turnu Severin)
- Short name: Drobeta
- Founded: 1958
- Dissolved: 2011
- Ground: Municipal
- Capacity: 20,054
| Home colours | Away colours |

Fotbal Club Drobeta-Turnu Severin was a Romanian professional football club from Drobeta-Turnu Severin, Mehedinți County, founded in 1958 and dissolved in 2011.

== History ==
The club was founded in 1958 under the name Drubeta Turnu Severin, with Drubeta being a historical spelling variant of Drobeta, inspired by the ancient Roman castrum on whose site the town of Turnu Severin stands.

In its first season, after taking over CFR Turnu Severin’s place in Divizia C, Drubeta made an immediate impact, finishing 2nd in Series VI and earning promotion to the second division after the competition was disbanded and Divizia B was expanded to three series of 14 teams each. In the second division, Drubeta ranked 12th in the 1959–60 season and 14th in the following season, after which it was relegated to the regional championship, as Divizia C was being dissolved once again.

In the 1961–62 season, Drubeta went on to win the Oltenia Regional Championship, qualifying for the promotion play-offs, where it finished 2nd in Series II held at Piatra Neamț, thereby quickly returning to the second division.

After this promotion, the club changed its name to Metalul Turnu Severin. However, after only one season, it was relegated to the re-established Divizia C, having finished last in its series.

In Divizia C, Metalul competed in the West Series. In the 1963–64 season, it finished as runners-up and reached the Round of 16 of the Cupa României, where it was defeated 0–3 by Crișul Oradea, followed by a 4th place in 1964–65, 7th in 1965–66, and 12th in the 1966–67 season.

In the 1967–68 season, Metalul, led by Constantin Lepădatu, finished as runners-up, one point behind Electroputere Craiova, and qualified for the Divizia B promotion/relegation play-offs, where it was ranked 3rd in Group II, held in Arad, thus returning to the second division. The squad included Mîniosu, Corcovan, Chițulescu, Budănescu, Constantin, Cîntar, Cîrtog, Șandru, Diaconu, Hîrșova, Prodan, Căprioru, Jimboreanu, Chirițescu, Pelea, Gall, Sava, Floca, and Zaharia.

In Divizia B, Metalul competed in Series II, finished 9th in the 1968–69 season, and was relegated in the following campaign after being ranked last, a season during which it also reached the Round of 16 of the Cupa României, eliminating first-division side CFR Cluj with a 5–2 victory, before losing 1–3 to another top-flight team, Argeș Pitești.

In Divizia C, Metalul competed in Series V, finishing 8th in the 1970–71 season, and went on to win Series VII in the 1971–72 season under the leadership of Constantin Lepădatu, qualifying for the promotion play-off, where it finished 1st in Group III, played in Râmnicu Vâlcea against Independența Sibiu and Vagonul Arad. The squad included Angelescu, Nae, Cîntar, Muschici, Trașcu, Cîrtog, Vișan, Davidescu, Sandu, Jimboreanu, Iacob, Olteanu, Biță, Țîră, Getoiu, Căprioru, and Coculescu.

In 1972, the name of the ancient Drobeta was added to the city's name, and the club was renamed Metalul Drobeta-Turnu Severin. However, the presence in the second division was again short-lived. It ranked 12th in the 1972–73 season under Constantin Lepădatu, and under Constantin Matache, Metalul finished 5th in the 1973–74 season and 16th at the end of the 1974–75 season, being relegated back to the third division. In Divizia C, it finished 5th in Series VII in the 1975–76 season and reached the Round of 32 in the Cupa României before losing to FIL Orăștie 0–0 and 3–4 on penalties.

In 1976, it merged with fellow city side MEVA – the team of Întreprinderea de Materiale pentru Exploatarea Vagoanelor (lit. 'The Enterprise for Materials for the Exploitation of Railway Wagons') – and formed CSM Drobeta-Turnu Severin (Club Sportiv Muncitoresc, “Workers’ Sports Club”), which took 2nd place in Series VII in the 1976–77 season and 1st in the 1977–78 in the same series, with Gheorghe Nuțescu on the bench, returning to the second division. However, it relegated after one season in Divizia B after finishing 15th in Series II.

Two more seasons in Divizia C followed, finishing 5th in Series VII in 1979–80 and returning once again to Divizia B by winning Series VII in the 1980–81 season, followed by another relegation after two seasons in the second division, in which it was ranked 13th in Series III in 1981–82 and 15th in Series II in 1982–83. However, the team returned to the second division after one season, finishing 1st in Series VII under Marin Bojin’s leadership as player-coach, with a core squad consisting of Dulică, Niță, Dumitrășcuță, Urziceanu, Stan, Marcoci, Bilan, Olteanu, Piticu, Al. Cațan, I. Cațan, Litră, Hornoiu, Țîră, Iordache, Mișu, Tița, and Arnăutu.

In Divizia B, Drobeta managed to finish above the relegation line in Series II, ranking 12th in 1998–99 under Nicolae Ungureanu and, from the start of the second half, Florin Cioroianu, and 11th in 1999–2000, with Cioroianu replaced during the first half by Gheorghe Cazacu and Marin Bojin taking over in the second half, before being relegated at the end of the 2000–01 season after finishing 13th. In the 2001–02 season, it competed in Series V of Divizia C but withdrew from the championship during the winter break.

In 2007, Severnav Drobeta-Turnu Severin was promoted to Liga II and changed its name to FC Drobeta-Turnu Severin, thus reviving the traditional club from Drobeta-Turnu Severin. In the 2007–08 season, the team finished 5th in Series II and reached the Round of 32 of the Cupa României, where it lost 1–3 to Ceahlăul Piatra Neamț.

In the 2008–09 season, Iulian Mihăescu was appointed head coach but left during the winter break while the team was 2nd, three points behind the Series II leader, to become Ioan Andone’s assistant at Al Ettifaq. He was replaced by Eugen Neagoe, who lasted only four matches, after which club president Vasile Mănescu took over and led Drobeta to a 5th-place finish.

Marian Bucurescu returned for the 2009–10 campaign but resigned after four matches, being replaced by Valeriu Tița. In February 2010, FC Drobeta-Turnu Severin withdrew after its investors withdrew their financial support. As a result, the club lost all remaining matches by 0–3 forfeit. This marked the club’s second dissolution, after the first one in 2002.

In August 2010, FC Drobeta-Turnu Severin was refounded by the local municipality and enrolled in the 2010–11 Liga III Liga III. Cornel Mihart was appointed head coach, but only until the third round, when Viorel Ion took over, with Mihart remaining as assistant. Viorel Ion lasted ten matchdays, after which he was replaced by Cornel Mihart. Following an FRF decision denying the club promotion rights to Liga II for three seasons, the municipality withdrew its support, and FC Drobeta-Turnu Severin was transferred to the Calafat Municipality, playing its home matches at Dunărea Stadium under head coach Claudiu Oncică. However, in April 2011, the club was dissolved for the third time in its history due to financial problems.

== Honours ==
Liga II

- Runners-up (1): 1989–90

Liga III

- Winners (4): 1971–72, 1977–78, 1980–81, 1983–84
- Runners-up (7): 1958–59, 1963–64, 1967–68, 1976–77, 1995–96, 1996–97, 1997–98

== Former managers ==
- (Romania) Constantin Oțet (1964)
- (Romania) Viorel Mateianu (1987)
- (Romania) Ilie Balaci (1989–1991)
- (Romania) Nicolae Manea (1991–1992)
- (Romania) Nicolae Zamfir (1993–1994)
- (Romania) Nicolae Ungureanu (1996–1997)
- (Romania) Florin Cioroianu (1997–1998)
- (Romania) Nicolae Ungureanu (1998)
- (Romania) Florin Cioroianu (1999)
- (Romania) Gheorghe Cazacu (1999–2000)
- (Romania) Marin Bojin (2000)
- (Romania) Marian Bucurescu (2007–2008)
- (Romania) Valeriu Tița (2009)
- (Romania) Eugen Neagoe (2009)
- (Romania) Viorel Ion (2010)
- (Romania) Nicolae Tilihoi
