= 1966–67 Divizia B =

Divizia B
- Season: 1966–67
- Promoted: Dinamo Bacău; ASA Mureșul Târgu Mureș
- Relegated: Progresul Brăila; Minerul Lupeni; Oțelul Galați; Unirea Dej

The 1966–67 Divizia B was the 27th season of the second tier of the Romanian football league system.

The format has been maintained to two series, each of them having 14 teams. At the end of the season the winners of the series promoted to Divizia A and the last two places from each series relegated to Divizia C.

== Team changes ==
=== To Divizia B ===
Promoted from Divizia C

- Chimia Suceava
- Metrom Brașov
- CFR Timișoara
- Unirea Dej

Relegated from Divizia A

- Crișul Oradea
- Siderurgistul Galați

=== From Divizia B ===
Relegated to Divizia C

- CFR Roșiori
- Recolta Carei
- Metalul Trgoviște
- Arieșul Turda

Promoted to Divizia A

- Progresul București
- Jiul Petrila

=== Renamed teams ===
Știința București was renamed as Politehnica București.

== League tables ==
=== Serie I ===
Pos	Team	Pld	W	D	L	GF	GA	GD	Pts	Promotion or relegation
1	Dinamo Bacău (C, P)	26	15	6	5	48	18	+30	36	Promotion to Divizia A
2	Siderurgistul Galați	26	13	6	7	38	27	+11	32	
3	Chimia Suceava	26	11	8	7	31	21	+10	30	
4	Dinamo Victoria București	26	9	9	8	35	28	+7	27	
5	Politehnica București	26	11	5	10	38	35	+3	27	
6	Flacăra Moreni	26	12	3	11	27	35	−8	27	
7	Poiana Câmpina	26	12	2	12	32	28	+4	26	
8	Metalurgistul București	26	10	5	11	33	33	0	25	
9	Ceahlăul Piatra Neamț	26	9	7	10	34	43	−9	25	
10	Metrom Brașov	26	7	10	9	35	29	+6	24	
11	CFR Pașcani	26	8	8	10	33	39	−6	24	
12	Oltul Râmnicu Vâlcea	26	9	6	11	30	43	−13	24	
13	Progresul Brăila (R)	26	8	6	12	28	35	−7	22	Relegation to Divizia C
14	Oțelul Galați (R)	26	4	7	15	15	43	−28	15	Relegation to Divizia C

Source: romaniansoccer.ro
Rules for classification: 1) Points 2) Head-to-head points; 3) Head-to-head goal difference; 4) Head-to-head goals scored; 5) Head-to-head away goals scored; 6) Goal difference; 7) Goals scored.
(C) Champions; (P) Promoted; (R) Relegated

=== Serie II ===
Pos	Team	Pld	W	D	L	GF	GA	GD	Pts	Promotion or relegation
1	ASA Mureșul Târgu Mureș (C, P)	26	15	7	4	41	14	+27	37	Promotion to Divizia A
2	Minerul Baia Mare	26	16	3	7	37	23	+14	35	
3	Vagonul Arad	26	14	3	9	58	25	+33	31	
4	CFR Timișoara	26	13	5	8	44	29	+15	31	
5	CSM Reșița	26	14	2	10	46	36	+10	30	
6	Cugir	26	11	5	10	42	43	−1	27	
7	Crișul Oradea	26	11	2	13	39	30	+9	24	
8	Gaz Metan Mediaș	26	9	6	11	34	40	−6	24	
9	IS Câmpia Turzii	26	9	5	12	30	34	−4	23	
10	CSM Sibiu	26	10	3	13	33	38	−5	23	
11	Clujeana Cluj	26	8	7	11	26	35	−9	23	
12	CFR Arad	26	8	5	13	26	35	−9	21	
13	Minerul Lupeni (R)	26	8	5	13	27	52	−25	21	Relegation to Divizia C
14	Unirea Dej (R)	26	4	6	16	24	73	−49	14	Relegation to Divizia C

Source: romaniansoccer.ro
Rules for classification: 1) Points 2) Head-to-head points; 3) Head-to-head goal difference; 4) Head-to-head goals scored; 5) Head-to-head away goals scored; 6) Goal difference; 7) Goals scored.
(C) Champions; (P) Promoted; (R) Relegated

== See also ==
- 1966–67 Divizia A
- 1966–67 Cupa României
