= 1968–69 Divizia B =

Divizia B
- Season: 1968–69
- Country: Romania
- Teams: 32 (2x16)
- Promoted: Steagul Roșu Brașov; CFR Cluj
- Relegated: CFR Pașcani; Medicina Cluj; Electronica Obor București; IS Câmpia Turzii

The 1968–69 Divizia B was the 29th season of the second tier of the Romanian football league system.

The format has been maintained to two series, but the number of teams was expanded, each of the series having 16 teams, instead of 14. At the end of the season the winners of the series promoted to Divizia A and the last two places from each series relegated to Divizia C.

== Team changes ==
=== To Divizia B ===
Promoted from Divizia C

- Oțelul Galați
- Dunărea Giurgiu
- Electroputere Craiova
- Medicina Cluj
- Progresul Brăila
- Metalul Turnu Severin
- Gloria Bârlad

Relegated from Divizia A

- Steagul Roșu Brașov

=== From Divizia B ===
Relegated to Divizia C

- Victoria Roman

Promoted to Divizia A

- Politehnica Iași
- Vagonul Arad
- ASA Crișul Oradea

== League tables ==
=== Serie I ===
Pos	Team	Pld	W	D	L	GF	GA	GD	Pts	Promotion or relegation
1	Steagul Roșu Brașov (C, P)	30	17	7	6	48	24	+24	41	Promotion to Divizia A
2	Politehnica Galați	30	15	5	10	38	25	+13	35	
3	Metalul București	30	14	6	10	54	32	+22	34	
4	Flacăra Moreni	30	14	6	10	35	34	+1	34	
5	Ceahlăul Piatra Neamț	30	13	7	10	39	33	+6	33	
6	Poiana Câmpina	30	13	7	10	31	36	−5	33	
7	Portul Constanța	30	13	6	11	53	31	+22	32	
8	Progresul Brăila	30	11	10	9	31	36	−5	32	
9	Oțelul Galați	30	11	8	11	37	34	+3	30	
10	Chimia Suceava	30	11	7	12	35	34	+1	29	
11	Politehnica București	30	10	8	12	36	45	−9	28	
12	Dunărea Giurgiu	30	11	4	15	23	36	−13	26	
13	Gloria Bârlad	30	10	6	14	36	50	−14	26	
14	Metrom Brașov	30	10	5	15	35	44	−9	25	
15	CFR Pașcani (R)	30	10	3	17	30	48	−18	23	Relegation to Divizia C
16	Electronica Obor București (R)	30	7	5	18	32	51	−19	19	Relegation to Divizia C

Source: romaniansoccer.ro
Rules for classification: 1) Points 2) Head-to-head points; 3) Head-to-head goal difference; 4) Head-to-head goals scored; 5) Head-to-head away goals scored; 6) Goal difference; 7) Goals scored.
(C) Champions; (P) Promoted; (R) Relegated

=== Serie II ===
Pos	Team	Pld	W	D	L	GF	GA	GD	Pts	Promotion or relegation
1	CFR Cluj (C, P)	30	16	8	6	57	31	+26	40	Promotion to Divizia A
2	CSM Reșița	30	16	3	11	46	30	+16	35	
3	Olimpia Oradea	30	14	5	11	46	41	+5	33	
4	Metalul Hunedoara	30	15	2	13	41	29	+12	32	
5	CFR Arad	30	13	6	11	43	36	+7	32	
6	Politehnica Timișoara	30	12	8	10	42	35	+7	32	
7	Electroputere Craiova	30	14	4	12	41	47	−6	32	
8	CSM Sibiu	30	14	3	13	47	41	+6	31	
9	Metalul Turnu Severin	30	14	3	13	41	48	−7	31	
10	Gaz Metan Mediaș	30	11	8	11	34	31	+3	30	
11	CFR Timișoara	30	10	9	11	41	36	+5	29	
12	Cugir	30	11	7	12	28	36	−8	29	
13	Minerul Baia Mare	30	11	4	15	24	27	−3	26	
14	Chimia Râmnicu Vâlcea	30	9	8	13	23	44	−21	26	
15	Medicina Cluj (R)	30	7	8	15	39	56	−17	22	Relegation to Divizia C
16	IS Câmpia Turzii (R)	30	6	8	16	32	57	−25	20	Relegation to Divizia C

Source: romaniansoccer.ro
Rules for classification: 1) Points 2) Head-to-head points; 3) Head-to-head goal difference; 4) Head-to-head goals scored; 5) Head-to-head away goals scored; 6) Goal difference; 7) Goals scored.
(C) Champions; (P) Promoted; (R) Relegated

== See also ==
- 1968–69 Divizia A
- 1968–69 Divizia C
- 1968–69 County Championship
- 1968–69 Cupa României
