= 1968–69 County Championship =

27th season of the Liga IV, the fourth tier of the Romanian football league

Liga IV
- Season: 1968–69

The 1968–69 County Championship was the 27th season of the Liga IV, the fourth tier of the Romanian football league system. The champions of each county association play against one from a neighboring county in a play-off to gain promotion to Divizia C.

== County championships ==
- Alba (AB)
- Arad (AR)
- Argeș (AG)
- Bacău (BC)
- Bihor (BH)
- Bistrița-Năsăud (BN)
- Botoșani (BT)
- Brașov (BV)
- Brăila (BR)
- Bucharest (B)
- Buzău (BZ)
- Caraș-Severin (CS)
- Cluj (CJ)
- Constanța (CT)
- Covasna (CV)
- Dâmbovița (DB)
- Dolj (DJ)
- Galați (GL)
- Gorj (GJ)
- Harghita (HR)
- Hunedoara (HD)
- Ialomița (IL)
- Iași (IS)
- Ilfov (IF)
- Maramureș (MM)
- Mehedinți (MH)
- Mureș (MS)
- Neamț (NT)
- Olt (OT)
- Prahova (PH)
- Satu Mare (SM)
- Sălaj (SJ)
- Sibiu (SB)
- Suceava (SV)
- Teleorman (TR)
- Timiș (TM)
- Tulcea (TL)
- Vaslui (VS)
- Vâlcea (VL)
- Vrancea (VN)

== Promotion play-off ==
First phase

The matches were played on 22, 29 June and 2 July 1969.

Team 1	Series	Team 2	Game 1	Game 2	Game 3
Constructorul Craiova (DJ)	4–5	(CS) CFR Caransebeș	2–1	0–1	2–3
Chimia Bradul Vama (SV)	2–3	(BC) Minerul Comănești	1–0	1–3	
Unirea ITO Galați (GL)	2–4	(BZ) Foresta Nehoiu	2–2	0–2	
Metalul Mangalia (CT)	0–2	(B) Laromet București	0–0	0–2	
Vagonul Ploiești (PH)	4–3	(TR) CFR Roșiori	1–1	1–1	2–1
Minerul Bihor (BH)	0–1	(HD) Minerul Teliuc	0–0	0–1	
Dermata Cluj (CJ)	0–2	(MM) Chimistul Baia Mare	0–0	0–2	
Lemnarul Târgu Mureș (MS)	1–2	(BV) Celuloza Zărnești	1–1	0–1	

Second phase

The matches were played on 6, 13 and 16 July 1969.

Team 1	Series	Team 2	Game 1	Game 2	Game 3
Minerul Comănești (BC)	6–0	(IS) ITI Iași	3–0	3–0	
Volanul Botoșani (BT)	2–3	(NT) Constructorul Piatra Neamț	2–1	0–2	
Foresta Nehoiu (BZ)	3–5	(VN) Locomotiva Adjud	3–1	0–4	
Dunărea Brăila (BR)	6–1	(VS) Recolta IAS Lazea	3–1	3–0	
Știința Ciulnița (IL)	3–10	(B) Laromet București	1–2	2–8	
Minerul Măcin (TL)	0–7	(IF) ICAB Arcuda	0–4	0–3	
Metalul Colibași (AG)	2–0	(PH) Vagonul Ploiești	2–0	0–0	
Petrolul Târgoviște (DB)	5–4	(OT) CFR Caracal	2–2	2–2	1–0
Metalurgistul Sadu (GJ)	2–4	(CS) CFR Caransebeș	2–1	0–3	
Lotru Brezoi (VL)	2–4	(MH) Unirea Orșova	1–0	1–4	
Unirea Alba Iulia (AB)	2–6	(TM) Electromotor Timișoara	2–2	0–4	
Chimistul Baia Mare (MM)	3–2	(SM) Rapid Satu Mare	1–1	2–1	
Progresul Cehu Silvaniei (SJ)	1–7	(BN) Foresta Năsăud	0–1	1–6	
Celuloza Zărnești (BV)	2–4	(HR) Viitorul Gheorgheni	1–0	1–4	
Independența Sibiu (SB)	4–1	(CV) Carpați Covasna	2–0	2–1	
Teba Arad (AR)	4–4 (Note: Minerul Teliuc promoted due to the younger average age.)	(HD) Minerul Teliuc	2–2	2–2	0–0

== Championships standings ==
=== Arad County ===
Pos	Team	Pld	W	D	L	GF	GA	GD	Pts	Qualification or relegation
1	Teba Arad (C, Q)	24	20	2	2	66	17	+49	42	Qualification to promotion play-off
2	Victoria Ineu II	24	17	2	5	44	19	+25	36	
3	Gloria Arad	24	15	2	7	61	20	+41	32	
4	Șoimii Pâncota	24	11	5	8	51	43	+8	27	
5	Victoria Ineu	24	10	7	7	30	27	+3	27	
6	Crișana Sebiș	24	9	6	9	32	38	−6	24	
7	Mureșul Lipova	24	9	5	10	34	35	−1	23	
8	Stăruința Dorobanți	24	8	5	11	31	35	−4	21	
9	Progresul Pecica	24	8	2	14	27	44	−17	18	
10	Foresta Beliu	24	7	3	14	36	45	−9	17	
11	Victoria Chișineu-Criș	24	7	2	15	34	62	−28	16	
12	Motorul Arad	24	7	1	16	24	49	−25	15	
13	Unirea Sântana	24	4	6	14	21	57	−36	14	
14	Recolta Buteni (R)	0	0	0	0	0	0	0	0 (Note: Recolta Buteni was excluded from the championship after 10 rounds and all its results were canceled.)	Expelled

Rules for classification: 1) points; 2) goal difference; 3) number of goals scored.
(C) Champions; (Q) Qualified for the phase indicated; (R) Relegated

=== Bacău County ===
Pos	Team	Pld	W	D	L	GF	GA	GD	Pts	Qualification or relegation
1	Minerul Comănești (Q)	22	16	1	5	55	17	+38	33	Qualification to promotion play-off
2	Gloria Zemeș	22	13	3	6	36	28	+8	29	
3	Energia Gheorghe Gheorghiu-Dej	22	12	3	7	34	22	+12	27	
4	Tractorul Moinești	22	12	2	8	36	29	+7	26	
5	Cauciucul Gheorghe Gheorghiu-Dej	22	10	5	7	37	33	+4	25	
6	Avântul Buhuși	22	11	1	10	44	36	+8	23	
7	Oituz Târgu Ocna	22	10	2	10	33	30	+3	22	
8	Petrolistul Dărmănești	22	8	6	8	27	24	+3	22	
9	Bradul HCC Bacău	22	9	4	9	38	42	−4	22	
10	Partizanul Bacău	22	6	5	11	34	39	−5	17	
11	Forestierul Agăș	22	6	4	12	41	43	−2	16	
12	Flamura Roșie Sascut (Note: Flamura Roșie Sascut was excluded in the second part of the season and lost all remaining matches with 0–3.)	22	1	0	21	9	81	−72	2	

Rules for classification: 1) points; 2) goal difference; 3) number of goals scored.
(Q) Qualified for the phase indicated

=== Bihor County ===
Pos	Team	Pld	W	D	L	GF	GA	GD	Pts	Qualification or relegation
1	Minerul Bihor (C, Q)	26	16	3	7	61	23	+38	35	Qualification to promotion play-off
2	Foresta Tileagd	26	14	4	8	42	22	+20	32	
3	Bihorul Beiuș	26	14	3	9	58	44	+14	31	
4	Recolta Valea lui Mihai	26	11	8	7	56	31	+25	30	
5	Minerul Voivozi	26	14	2	10	52	34	+18	30	
6	Petrolul Suplac	26	11	7	8	40	31	+9	29	
7	Înfrățirea Oradea	26	13	3	10	44	38	+6	29	
8	Blănuri Oradea	26	12	4	10	46	42	+4	28	
9	Stăruința Săcuieni	26	11	5	10	46	42	+4	27	
10	Minerul Șuncuiuș	26	11	4	11	48	46	+2	26	
11	Voința Oradea	26	9	5	12	32	36	−4	23	
12	Stăruința Aleșd	26	8	5	13	37	54	−17	21	
13	Viitorul Salonta (R)	26	6	6	14	39	58	−19	18	Relegation to Bihor Championship II
14	Recolta Diosig (R)	26	1	3	22	11	111	−100	5	Relegation to Bihor Championship II
15	Recolta Sălard (Note: Recolta Sălard and Voința Șimian was excluded from the championship in the first part of the season and all their results were canceled.)	0	0	0	0	0	0	0	0	Expelled
16	Voința Șimian	0	0	0	0	0	0	0	0	Expelled

Source: adt.arcanum .com
Rules for classification: 1) Points; 2) Goal difference; 3) Number of goals scored.
(C) Champions; (Q) Qualified for the phase indicated; (R) Relegated

=== Botoșani County ===
Pos	Team	Pld	W	D	L	GF	GA	GD	Pts	Qualification or relegation
1	Volanul Botoșani (C, Q)	18	16	0	2	82	15	+67	32	Qualification to promotion play-off
2	Unirea Săveni	18	14	2	2	67	13	+54	30	
3	Siretul Bucecea	18	13	1	4	65	21	+44	27	
4	Sănătatea Darabani	18	11	0	7	51	36	+15	22	
5	Rapid Ungureni	18	9	2	7	30	31	−1	20	
6	Victoria Nicolae Bălcescu	18	8	2	8	36	47	−11	18	
7	Progresul Ștefănești	18	7	0	11	28	57	−29	14	
8	Victoria Coțusca	18	5	1	12	25	57	−32	11	
9	Prutul Rădăuți-Prut (Note: Prutul Rădăuți-Prut withdrew in the second part of the season and lost all remaining matches with 0–3.) (R)	18	3	0	15	13	66	−53	6	Relegation to Botoșani Championship II
10	Sportivul Trușești (Note: Sportivul Trușești withdrew in the first part of the season and lost all remaining matches with 0–3.) (R)	18	0	0	18	0	54	−54	0	Relegation to Botoșani Championship II

Rules for classification: 1) Points; 2) Goal difference; 3) Number of goals scored.
(C) Champions; (Q) Qualified for the phase indicated; (R) Relegated

=== Brașov County ===
Pos	Team	Pld	W	D	L	GF	GA	GD	Pts	Qualification or relegation
1	Celuloza Zărnești (C, Q)	22	14	5	3	33	14	+19	33	Qualification to promotion play-off
2	Măgura Codlea	22	13	6	3	50	14	+36	32	
3	Politehnica Brașov	22	10	7	5	42	18	+24	27	
4	ICIM Brașov	22	10	7	5	28	15	+13	27	
5	Precizia Săcele	22	11	4	7	36	19	+17	26	
6	Textila Prejmer	22	7	10	5	23	19	+4	24	
7	CFR Brașov	22	8	5	9	20	27	−7	21	
8	Ceramica Feldioara	22	7	6	9	26	39	−13	20	
9	Prefabricate Brașov	22	7	3	12	26	34	−8	17	
10	Utilajul Făgăraș	22	6	5	11	21	29	−8	17	
11	Metalul Brașov	22	4	3	15	17	57	−40	11	
12	Hidromecanica Brașov	22	3	3	16	7	74	−67	9	

Rules for classification: 1) points; 2) goal difference; 3) number of goals scored.
(C) Champions; (Q) Qualified for the phase indicated

=== Bucharest ===
Pos	Team	Pld	W	D	L	GF	GA	GD	Pts	Qualification or relegation
1	Laromet București (C, Q)	30	18	9	3	48	20	+28	45	Qualification to promotion play-off
2	Avântul 9 Mai	30	13	10	7	50	39	+11	36	
3	Granitul București	30	12	9	9	30	30	0	33	
4	Vâscoza București	30	12	8	10	44	35	+9	32	
5	ICSIM București	30	12	7	11	43	32	+11	31	
6	Automatica București	30	8	15	7	26	25	+1	31	
7	IOR București	30	11	8	11	41	33	+8	30	
8	ASA București	30	9	11	10	29	33	−4	29	
9	Dinamo Obor București	30	9	10	11	37	33	+4	28	
10	IPROFIL București	30	8	11	11	34	32	+2	27	
11	Constructorul București	30	8	11	11	30	39	−9	27	
12	Bere Rahova	30	6	15	9	37	47	−10	27	
13	Acumulatorul București	30	9	9	12	31	46	−15	27	
14	Gloria București (Note: Gloria București was spared from relegation due to the promotion of Laromet București in Divizia C.)	30	10	6	14	33	42	−9	26	Spared from relegation
15	Luxor București (R)	30	7	12	11	34	44	−10	26	Relegation to Bucharest Championship II
16	Vulcan București (R)	30	9	7	14	30	47	−17	25	Relegation to Bucharest Championship II

Rules for classification: 1) Points; 2) Goal difference; 3) Number of goals scored.
(C) Champions; (Q) Qualified for the phase indicated; (R) Relegated

=== Buzău County ===
Pos	Team	Pld	W	D	L	GF	GA	GD	Pts	Qualification or relegation
1	Foresta Nehoiu (C, Q)	30	23	2	5	123	19	+104	48	Qualification to promotion play-off
2	Progresul Râmnicu Sărat	30	21	2	7	108	32	+76	44	
3	Steaua Roșie Buzău	30	18	3	9	85	46	+39	39	
4	Viitorul Rușețu	29	16	7	6	72	39	+33	39	
5	Sârma Buzău	29	18	2	9	63	32	+31	38	
6	Chimia Buzău	30	13	10	7	62	45	+17	36	
7	Automobilul Buzău	30	12	10	8	62	52	+10	34	
8	Pinul Nehoiu	30	14	4	12	51	46	+5	32	
9	Recolta Ziduri	29	12	4	13	64	81	−17	28	
10	Partizanul Monteoru	29	12	3	14	51	65	−14	27	
11	Spartac Poșta Câlnău	30	10	4	16	57	81	−24	24	
12	Zahărul Buzău	30	8	6	16	56	91	−35	22	
13	Ceramica Buzău	30	6	8	16	46	88	−42	20	
14	Progresul Pătârlagele	30	7	4	19	56	89	−33	18	
15	Rapid Buzău	30	6	5	19	43	89	−46	17	
16	Flamura Racovițeni (Note: Flamura Racovițeni excluded in the second part of the season and lost all remaining matches with 0–3.)	30	3	3	24	29	133	−104	9	

Rules for classification: 1) Points; 2) Goal difference; 3) Number of goals scored.
(C) Champions; (Q) Qualified for the phase indicated

=== Constanța County ===
Pos	Team	Pld	W	D	L	GF	GA	GD	Pts	Qualification or relegation
1	Metalul Mangalia (C, Q)	30	23	0	7	52	29	+23	46	Qualification to promotion play-off
2	Victoria Saligny	30	21	2	7	73	31	+42	44	
3	Știința Constanța	30	14	11	5	66	26	+40	39	
4	Petrolul Constanța	30	14	11	5	53	23	+30	39	
5	Tractorul Chirnogeni	30	15	8	7	53	34	+19	38	
6	CFR Constanța	30	15	7	8	56	32	+24	37	
7	Chimia Năvodari	30	14	8	8	51	41	+10	36	
8	Victoria Medgidia	30	14	6	10	47	33	+14	34	
9	Șantierul Naval Constanța	30	8	14	8	41	35	+6	30	
10	CFR Medgidia	30	10	8	12	41	41	0	28	
11	Voința Constanța	30	10	7	13	41	40	+1	27	
12	Recolta Negru Vodă	30	10	6	14	48	54	−6	26	
13	Viitorul Constanța	29	6	5	18	30	67	−37	17	
14	Munca Ovidiu	29	7	2	20	30	74	−44	16	
15	Spartac Constanța (R)	30	3	6	21	23	93	−70	12	Relegation to Constanța County Championship II
16	Marina Constanța (R)	30	2	5	23	19	75	−56	9	Relegation to Constanța County Championship II

Rules for classification: 1) Points; 2) Goal difference; 3) Number of goals scored.
(C) Champions; (Q) Qualified for the phase indicated; (R) Relegated

=== Dolj County ===
Series I

Pos	Team	Pld	W	D	L	GF	GA	GD	Pts	Qualification or relegation
1	Armata Craiova (Q)	20	17	3	0	70	16	+54	37	Qualification to championship final
2	Recolta Urzicuța	20	13	3	4	47	17	+30	29	
3	Progresul Băilești	20	13	2	5	46	24	+22	28	
4	Unirea Goicea Mare	20	12	3	5	65	16	+49	27	
5	Metalul Craiova	20	10	5	5	49	27	+22	25	
6	Recolta Covei	20	6	4	10	29	39	−10	16	
7	Drum Nou Boureni	20	6	4	10	23	42	−19	16	
8	Avântul Rast	20	6	3	11	26	39	−13	15	
9	Recolta Afumați	20	5	1	14	21	50	−29	11	
10	Fulgerul Maglavit	20	5	1	14	23	54	−31	11	
11	Viitorul Poiana Mare	20	2	1	17	9	84	−75	5	
12	Sportivul Ghercești (Note: Sportivul Ghercești withdrew after 8 rounds and all its results were canceled.) (D)	0	0	0	0	0	0	0	0	Withdrew

Rules for classification: 1) Points; 2) Goal difference; 3) Number of goals scored.
(D) Disqualified; (Q) Qualified for the phase indicated
Notes:

Series II

Pos	Team	Pld	W	D	L	GF	GA	GD	Pts	Qualification or relegation
1	Constructorul Craiova (Q)	22	15	3	4	62	22	+40	33	Qualification to championship final
2	Avântul Bârca	22	13	5	4	47	22	+25	31	
3	Dunărea Bistreț	22	14	0	8	53	35	+18	28	
4	Progresul Goicea Mică	22	11	4	7	50	22	+28	26	
5	Recolta Dăbuleni	22	10	6	6	52	36	+16	26	
6	Tractorul Bechet	22	11	4	7	48	38	+10	26	
7	Electrica Craiova	22	9	7	6	47	28	+19	25	
8	Unirea CZU Podari	22	9	3	10	40	46	−6	21	
9	Desnățuiul Giurgița	22	8	2	12	30	50	−20	18	
10	Progresul Segarcea	22	6	5	11	31	44	−13	17	
11	Jiul Valea Stanciului	22	6	1	15	23	67	−44	13	
12	Jiul Gângiova	22	0	0	22	10	83	−73	0	

Rules for classification: 1) Points; 2) Goal difference; 3) Number of goals scored.
(Q) Qualified for the phase indicated

Championship final

The matches were played on 8 and 12 June 1969 at Tineretului Stadium and 14 June at Central Stadium in Craiova.

Team 1	Series	Team 2	Game 1	Game 2	Game 3
Armata Craiova	2–3	Constructorul Craiova	0–0	1–1	1–2

Constructorul Craiova won the Dolj County Championship and qualifyto promotion play-off in Divizia C.

=== Galați County ===
Pos	Team	Pld	W	D	L	GF	GA	GD	Pts	Qualification or relegation
1	Unirea ITO Galați (C, Q)	26	20	3	3	79	12	+67	43	Qualification to promotion play-off
2	Constructorul ICMSG Galați	26	19	3	4	82	19	+63	41	
3	Mecanizatorul Târgu Bujor	26	15	5	6	57	29	+28	35	
4	Metalosport Galați	26	14	6	6	63	23	+40	34	
5	Siderurgistul CSG Galați	26	14	5	7	59	40	+19	33	
6	Victoria IGL Galați	26	15	2	9	50	35	+15	32	
7	Tractorul Galați	26	13	4	9	56	32	+24	30	
8	Trefilorul Galați	26	14	2	10	75	55	+20	30	
9	Recolta Tudor Vladimirescu	26	12	1	13	51	51	0	25	
10	Avântul Matca	26	8	2	16	42	75	−33	18	
11	Foresta Cosmești (Note: Foresta Cosmești, DVA Galați and Muncitorul Ghidigeni excluded during the season and lost all remaining matches with 0–3.)	26	7	1	18	32	65	−33	15	
12	DVA Galați	26	6	0	20	25	93	−68	12	
13	Viitorul Berești	26	4	2	20	32	113	−81	10	
14	Muncitorul Ghidigeni	26	1	3	22	11	72	−61	5	

Rules for classification: 1) Points; 2) Goal difference; 3) Number of goals scored.
(C) Champions; (Q) Qualified for the phase indicated

=== Harghita County ===
Pos	Team	Pld	W	D	L	GF	GA	GD	Pts	Qualification or relegation
1	Viitorul Gheorgheni (C, Q)	20	13	3	4	62	22	+40	29	Qualification to promotion play-off
2	Minerul Miercurea Ciuc	20	13	3	4	47	18	+29	29	
3	Mureșul Toplița	20	12	3	5	50	32	+18	27	
4	Metalul Vlăhița	20	10	4	6	44	34	+10	24	
5	Apemin Borsec	20	10	3	7	58	31	+27	23	
6	Harghita Odorheiu Secuiesc	20	9	4	7	34	24	+10	22	
7	Flamura Roșie Sânsimion	20	9	3	8	35	39	−4	21	
8	Minerul Chileni	20	7	3	10	32	47	−15	17	
9	Rapid Ciceu	20	6	1	13	20	50	−30	13	
10	Complexul Gălăuțaș	20	3	3	14	23	63	−40	9	
11	Mureșul Remetea	20	3	0	17	9	54	−45	6	
12	Textila Miercurea Ciuc (D)	0	0	0	0	0	0	0	0 (Note: Textila Miercurea Ciuc, Bradul Ciceu and Șoimii Băile Tușnad withdrew from the championship and all their results were canceled.)	Withdrew
13	Bradul Ciceu (D)	0	0	0	0	0	0	0	0	Withdrew
14	Șoimii Băile Tușnad (D)	0	0	0	0	0	0	0	0	Withdrew

Rules for classification: 1) Points; 2) Goal difference; 3) Number of goals scored.
(C) Champions; (D) Disqualified; (Q) Qualified for the phase indicated

=== Hunedoara County ===
Pos	Team	Pld	W	D	L	GF	GA	GD	Pts	Qualification or relegation
1	Minerul Teliuc (C, Q)	26	18	6	2	70	15	+55	42	Qualification to promotion play-off
2	CFR Simeria	26	20	2	4	69	19	+50	42	
3	Parângul Lonea	26	12	6	8	53	32	+21	30	
4	Constructorul Hunedoara	26	12	3	11	46	32	+14	27	
5	Dacia Orăștie	26	12	3	11	44	40	+4	27	
6	Minerul Vulcan	26	12	1	13	43	39	+4	25	
7	Energia Deva	26	9	6	11	39	49	−10	24	
8	Minerul Aninoasa	26	8	7	11	40	46	−6	23	
9	Minerul Uricani	26	11	1	14	38	51	−13	23	
10	Abatorul Hațeg	26	10	3	13	33	47	−14	23	
11	Constructorul Lupeni	26	8	6	12	36	47	−11	22	
12	Preparatorul Petrila	26	9	4	13	34	54	−20	22	
13	Autobuzul Brad (R)	26	9	4	13	44	65	−21	22	Relegation to Hunedoara County Championship II
14	IGCL Hunedoara (R)	26	4	4	18	21	74	−53	12	Relegation to Hunedoara County Championship II

Rules for classification: 1) points; 2) goal difference; 3) number of goals scored.
(C) Champions; (Q) Qualified for the phase indicated; (R) Relegated

=== Iași County ===
Pos	Team	Pld	W	D	L	GF	GA	GD	Pts	Qualification or relegation
1	ITI Iași (C, Q)	18	15	2	1	57	17	+40	32	Qualification to promotion play-off
2	Siderurgistul Iași	18	14	2	2	57	10	+47	30	
3	Autobaza Pașcani	18	10	3	5	49	23	+26	23	
4	Moldova Tricotaje Iași	18	9	4	5	39	29	+10	22	
5	Constructorul Iași	18	9	4	5	37	27	+10	22	
6	Țesătura Iași	18	8	5	5	35	23	+12	21	
7	Viitorul Târgu Frumos	18	7	3	8	34	42	−8	17	
8	Unirea Iași	18	2	1	15	16	70	−54	5	
9	CFR Pașcani II	18	2	0	16	17	59	−42	4	
10	Siretul Lespezi	18	1	0	17	14	58	−44	2	

Rules for classification: 1) Points; 2) Goal difference; 3) Number of goals scored.
(C) Champions; (Q) Qualified for the phase indicated

=== Neamț County ===
Pos	Team	Pld	W	D	L	GF	GA	GD	Pts	Qualification or relegation
1	Constructorul Piatra Neamț (C, Q)	20	15	4	1	53	17	+36	34	Qualification to promotion play-off
2	Viitorul Săvinești	20	15	2	3	48	9	+39	32	
3	Unirea Roman	20	14	2	4	53	14	+39	30	
4	Celuloza Piatra Neamț	19	8	4	7	27	26	+1	20	
5	Metalul Roman	19	10	0	9	34	38	−4	20	
6	Bradul Roznov	20	7	4	9	30	40	−10	18	
7	Relonul Săvinești	20	8	1	11	28	25	+3	17	
8	Cetatea Târgu Neamț	20	7	3	10	28	36	−8	17	
9	Volanul Bicaz	20	6	2	12	26	49	−23	14	
10	Metalul Piatra Neamț	20	4	2	14	18	38	−20	10	
11	Tractorul Roman (R)	20	2	2	16	14	67	−53	6	Relegation to Neamț County Championship II
12	Betonul Roman (D)	0	0	0	0	0	0	0	0 (Note: Betonul Roman was excluded in the first part of the season and all its results were canceled.)	Expelled

Rules for classification: 1) Points; 2) Goal difference; 3) Number of goals scored.
(C) Champions; (D) Disqualified; (Q) Qualified for the phase indicated; (R) Relegated

=== Olt County ===
Pos	Team	Pld	W	D	L	GF	GA	GD	Pts	Qualification or relegation
1	CFR Caracal (C, Q)	20	14	2	4	54	13	+41	30	Qualification to promotion play-off
2	Aluminiu Slatina	20	14	1	5	62	21	+41	29	
3	Rapid Piatra-Olt	20	12	5	3	50	17	+33	29	
4	Gloria Deveselu	20	12	4	4	64	21	+43	28	
5	Petrolul Potcoava	20	12	1	7	45	36	+9	25	
6	Recolta Stoicănești	20	10	3	7	37	29	+8	23	
7	Valea Oltului Cilieni	20	5	3	12	39	60	−21	13	
8	Tractorul Radomirești	20	6	0	14	28	53	−25	12	
9	Înainte Tia Mare	20	4	4	12	24	63	−39	12	
10	Urzica	20	4	1	15	25	80	−55	9	
11	Gloria Nicolae Titulescu	20	3	2	15	30	68	−38	8	

Rules for classification: 1) points; 2) goal difference; 3) number of goals scored.
(C) Champions; (Q) Qualified for the phase indicated

=== Prahova County ===
Pos	Team	Pld	W	D	L	GF	GA	GD	Pts	Qualification or relegation
1	Vagonul Ploiești (C, Q)	26	19	3	4	48	17	+31	41	Qualification to promotion play-off
2	UZUC Ploiești	26	17	6	3	38	17	+21	40	
3	Victoria Florești	26	14	5	7	41	24	+17	33	
4	Rafinăria Câmpina	26	11	10	5	48	31	+17	32	
5	Electrica Câmpina	26	10	9	7	38	30	+8	29	
6	Carotajul Ploiești	26	10	7	9	44	29	+15	27	
7	Petrolul Băicoi	26	8	9	9	29	24	+5	25	
8	Viitorul Slănic	26	10	5	11	40	43	−3	25	
9	Feroemail Ploiești	26	9	5	12	36	38	−2	23	
10	Geamuri Boldești-Scăieni	26	7	7	12	22	36	−14	21	
11	Chimistul Valea Călugărească	26	9	3	14	32	56	−24	21	
12	Neptun Câmpina	26	7	4	15	27	42	−15	18	
13	Rafinăria Teleajen	26	4	7	15	26	54	−28	15	Spared from relegation
14	Avântul Măneciu	26	4	6	16	27	55	−28	14	Spared from relegation

Rules for classification: 1) points; 2) goal difference; 3) number of goals scored.
(C) Champions; (Q) Qualified for the phase indicated

=== Satu Mare County ===
Pos	Team	Pld	W	D	L	GF	GA	GD	Pts	Qualification or relegation
1	Rapid Satu Mare (C, Q)	30	20	7	3	79	25	+54	47	Qualification to promotion play-off
2	Forestiera Bixad	30	18	6	6	80	35	+45	42	
3	Spartac Satu Mare	30	18	3	9	81	40	+41	39	
4	Sticla Poiana Codrului	30	18	3	9	80	45	+35	39	
5	Recolta Sanislău	30	17	5	8	69	34	+35	39	
6	Unirea Tășnad	29	16	5	8	61	43	+18	37	
7	Recolta Urziceni	30	16	4	10	68	40	+28	36	
8	Energia Negrești	30	12	9	9	60	55	+5	33	
9	Crasna Lucăceni	30	11	7	12	44	34	+10	29	
10	Spicul Ardud	30	12	5	13	49	70	−21	29	
11	Victoria Livada	30	11	4	15	52	67	−15	26	
12	Recolta Turulung	30	8	4	18	41	73	−32	20	
13	Progresul Santău	29	9	2	18	40	87	−47	20	
14	Speranța Halmeu	30	6	5	19	35	85	−50	17	
15	Someșul Odoreu	30	5	4	21	31	78	−47	14	
16	Dacia Medieșu Aurit	30	4	3	23	25	84	−59	11	

Rules for classification: 1) Points; 2) Goal difference; 3) Number of goals scored.
(C) Champions; (Q) Qualified for the phase indicated

=== Sibiu County ===
Pos	Team	Pld	W	D	L	GF	GA	GD	Pts	Qualification or relegation
1	Independența Sibiu (C, Q)	26	17	3	6	67	25	+42	37	Qualification to promotion play-off
2	Record Mediaș	26	16	3	7	62	27	+35	35	
3	Textila Cisnădie	26	16	2	8	78	28	+50	34	
4	Carbosin Copșa Mică	26	14	3	9	50	32	+18	31	
5	Unirea Tălmaciu	26	10	10	6	43	18	+25	30	
6	Textila Mediaș	26	14	2	10	54	40	+14	30	
7	Metalul IO Sibiu	26	10	9	7	35	36	−1	29	
8	Sparta Mediaș	26	12	1	13	42	48	−6	25	
9	Elastic Sibiu (Note: Elastic Sibiu withdrew in the second part of the season and lost all remaining matches with 0–3.)	26	11	2	13	27	42	−15	24	
10	Metalurgica Sibiu	26	9	5	12	40	41	−1	23	
11	Automecanica Mediaș	26	7	4	15	31	67	−36	18	
12	CFR Sibiu	26	6	5	15	22	53	−31	17	
13	Progresul Agnita	26	7	3	16	33	72	−39	17	
14	Carpați Mârșa	26	5	4	17	33	88	−55	14	

Rules for classification: 1) Points; 2) Goal difference; 3) Number of goals scored.
(C) Champions; (Q) Qualified for the phase indicated

=== Suceava County ===
Pos	Team	Pld	W	D	L	GF	GA	GD	Pts	Qualification or relegation
1	Chimia Bradul Vama (C, Q)	22	17	1	4	68	23	+45	35	Qualification to promotion play-off
2	Silvicultorul Moldovița	22	14	3	5	49	19	+30	31	
3	Filatura Fălticeni	22	13	2	7	59	29	+30	28	
4	Avântul Rădăuți	22	11	6	5	50	26	+24	28	
5	Străduința Suceava	22	12	2	8	46	25	+21	26	
6	Avântul Frasin	22	11	4	7	38	29	+9	26	
7	Progresul IRA Suceava	22	7	6	9	28	39	−11	20	
8	Viitorul CIL Suceava	22	8	4	10	33	45	−12	20	
9	Ocrotirea Siret	22	9	1	12	33	36	−3	19	
10	Siretul Dolhasca	22	5	1	16	27	56	−29	11	
11	Bistrița Aurie Broșteni (R)	22	4	3	15	32	96	−64	11	Relegation to Suceava County Championship II
12	Forestierul Falcău (R)	22	4	1	17	19	59	−40	9	Relegation to Suceava County Championship II

Rules for classification: 1) Points; 2) Goal difference; 3) Number of goals scored.
(C) Champions; (Q) Qualified for the phase indicated; (R) Relegated

=== Timiș County ===
Pos	Team	Pld	W	D	L	GF	GA	GD	Pts	Qualification or relegation
1	Electromotor Timișoara (C, Q)	30	18	9	3	52	18	+34	45	Qualification to promotion play-off
2	Unirea Jimbolia	30	16	8	6	52	18	+34	40	
3	Auto Timișoara	30	14	10	6	55	22	+33	38	
4	Progresul Timișoara	30	13	9	8	43	23	+20	35	
5	Recaș	30	13	7	10	59	56	+3	33	
6	Laminorul Nădrag	30	13	7	10	48	60	−12	33	
7	Arta Textilă Timișoara	30	10	9	11	33	42	−9	29	
8	Politehnica Timișoara II	30	10	8	12	48	37	+11	28	
9	Progresul Ciacova	30	11	6	13	52	63	−11	28	
10	Șoimii Buziaș	30	8	10	12	48	51	−3	26	
11	Progresul Gătaia	30	9	8	13	54	58	−4	26	
12	Ceramica Jimbolia	30	8	10	12	34	41	−7	26	
13	Recolta Nerău	30	10	6	14	61	69	−8	26	
14	Chimia Margina	30	12	2	16	49	68	−19	26	
15	Timișul Lugoj (R)	30	7	7	16	37	57	−20	21	Relegation to Timiș County Championship II
16	Checeana Checea (R)	30	6	8	16	26	64	−38	20	Relegation to Timiș County Championship II

Rules for classification: 1) Points; 2) Goal difference; 3) Number of goals scored.
(C) Champions; (Q) Qualified for the phase indicated; (R) Relegated

=== Vaslui County ===
Pos	Team	Pld	W	D	L	GF	GA	GD	Pts	Qualification or relegation
1	Recolta IAS Laza (C, Q)	18	15	1	2	49	16	+33	31	Qualification to promotion play-off
2	Viitorul Vaslui	18	14	1	3	57	13	+44	29	
3	Metalul Bârlad	18	10	4	4	41	27	+14	24	
4	Hușana Huși	18	9	4	5	40	24	+16	22	
5	Avântul Codăești	18	8	4	6	32	25	+7	20	
6	Viitorul Hurdugi	18	5	4	9	24	41	−17	14	
7	Voința Vaslui	18	4	3	11	30	53	−23	11	
8	Recolta Tutova	18	4	3	11	15	37	−22	11	
9	Avântul Huși	18	3	3	12	15	37	−22	9	
10	Flacăra Murgeni	18	4	1	13	14	44	−30	9	

Rules for classification: 1) Points; 2) Goal difference; 3) Number of goals scored.
(C) Champions; (Q) Qualified for the phase indicated

== See also ==
- 1968–69 Divizia A
- 1968–69 Divizia B
- 1968–69 Divizia C
- 1968–69 Cupa României
