= 1968–69 Divizia C =

Third tier Romanian football league

Divizia C
- Season: 1968–69

The 1968–69 Divizia C was the 13th season of Liga III, the third tier of the Romanian football league system.

== League tables ==
=== Seria I ===
Pos	Team	Pld	W	D	L	GF	GA	GD	Pts	Promotion or relegation
1	Știința Bacău (C)	30	20	7	3	61	14	+47	47	Qualification to promotion play-off
2	Foresta Fălticeni	30	19	7	4	63	23	+40	45	
3	Nicolina Iași	30	13	11	6	56	35	+21	37	
4	Victoria Roman	30	16	4	10	53	35	+18	36	
5	Minerul Gura Humorului	30	14	7	9	44	30	+14	35	
6	Textila Botoșani	30	14	6	10	53	42	+11	34	
7	Minobrad Vatra Dornei	30	13	7	10	41	37	+4	33	
8	Textila Buhuși	30	13	6	11	49	36	+13	32	
9	Petrolul Moinești	30	11	6	13	51	44	+7	28	
10	Letea Bacău	30	11	5	14	32	46	−14	27	
11	Penicilina Iași	30	10	6	14	34	36	−2	26	
12	Rarăul Câmpulung Moldovenesc	30	10	6	14	34	48	−14	26	
13	Fulgerul Dorohoi	30	11	4	15	42	62	−20	26	
14	Foresta Ciurea	30	11	3	16	36	48	−12	25	
15	Cimentul Bicaz (R)	30	9	4	17	36	63	−27	22	Relegation to County Championship
16	Unirea Negrești (R)	30	0	1	29	9	95	−86	1 (Note: Unirea Negrești withdrew from championship at the beginning of first part, losing all matches with 0-3.)	Relegation to County Championship

Source: romaniansoccer.ro
Rules for classification: 1) points; 2) goal difference; 3) number of goals scored.
(C) Champions; (R) Relegated

=== Seria II ===
Pos	Team	Pld	W	D	L	GF	GA	GD	Pts	Promotion or relegation
1	Metalul Plopeni (C)	30	19	7	4	52	16	+36	45	Qualification to promotion play-off
2	Unirea Focșani	30	18	6	6	56	25	+31	42	
3	Șoimii Buzău	30	13	7	10	50	37	+13	33	
4	Gloria CFR Galați	30	14	3	13	40	38	+2	31	
5	Ancora Galați	30	12	6	12	40	42	−2	30	
6	Petrolistul Boldești	30	13	4	13	34	47	−13	30	
7	Delta Tulcea	30	10	9	11	40	29	+11	29	
8	Metalul Buzău	30	11	7	12	45	36	+9	29	
9	Chimia Gheorghiu-Dej	30	9	11	10	43	43	0	29	
10	Petrolul Berca	30	12	5	13	45	46	−1	29	
11	SUT Galați	30	9	11	10	31	39	−8	29	
12	Flamura Roșie Tecuci	30	11	6	13	38	50	−12	28	
13	Rulmentul Bârlad	30	9	9	12	24	27	−3	27	
14	Metalul Brăila	30	8	10	12	36	42	−6	26	
15	Chimia Mărășești (R)	30	11	3	16	43	49	−6	25	Relegation to County Championship
16	Gloria Tecuci (R)	30	7	4	19	20	71	−51	18	Relegation to County Championship

Source: romaniansoccer.ro
Rules for classification: 1) points; 2) goal difference; 3) number of goals scored.
(C) Champions; (R) Relegated

=== Seria III ===
Pos	Team	Pld	W	D	L	GF	GA	GD	Pts	Promotion or relegation
1	IMU Medgidia (C)	30	20	7	3	65	19	+46	47	Qualification to promotion play-off
2	TUG București	30	16	7	7	49	18	+31	39	
3	Șantierul Naval Oltenița	30	17	3	10	61	29	+32	37	
4	Autobuzul București	30	14	9	7	50	27	+23	37	
5	Cimentul Medgidia	30	13	8	9	47	42	+5	34	
6	Flacăra Roșie București	30	12	10	8	37	33	+4	34	
7	Electrica Constanța	30	13	5	12	45	37	+8	31	
8	ITC Constanța	30	9	10	11	27	34	−7	28	
9	Unirea Mânăstirea	30	12	3	15	30	44	−14	27	
10	Marina Mangalia	30	7	12	11	30	38	−8	26	
11	Celuloza Călărași	30	10	6	14	30	56	−26	26	
12	Olimpia Giurgiu	30	10	5	15	41	48	−7	25	
13	Sirena București	30	9	6	15	39	47	−8	24	
14	Petrolul Videle	30	9	6	15	28	47	−19	24	
15	Ideal Cernavodă (R)	30	6	9	15	26	57	−31	21	Relegation to County Championship
16	Aurora Urziceni (R)	30	6	8	16	28	57	−29	20	Relegation to County Championship

Source: romaniansoccer.ro
Rules for classification: 1) points; 2) goal difference; 3) number of goals scored.
(C) Champions; (R) Relegated

=== Seria IV ===
Pos	Team	Pld	W	D	L	GF	GA	GD	Pts	Promotion or relegation
1	Metalul Târgoviște (C)	30	22	6	2	83	26	+57	50	Qualification to promotion play-off
2	Carpați Sinaia	30	17	7	6	41	27	+14	41	
3	Comerțul Alexandria	30	15	7	8	49	32	+17	37	
4	Prahova Ploiești	30	15	6	9	53	30	+23	36	
5	Caraimanul Bușteni	30	14	8	8	48	31	+17	36	
6	Tehnometal București	30	15	5	10	51	37	+14	35	
7	Progresul Corabia	30	14	5	11	38	32	+6	33	
8	IRA Câmpina	30	13	6	11	44	27	+17	32	
9	Chimia Turnu Măgurele	30	11	8	11	34	42	−8	30	
10	Voința București	30	12	5	13	62	45	+17	29	
11	Muscelul Câmpulung	30	9	6	15	23	50	−27	24	
12	Progresul Balș	30	10	4	16	32	68	−36	24	
13	Mașini Unelte București	30	8	7	15	40	43	−3	23	
14	Unirea Drăgășani	30	8	6	16	23	50	−27	22	
15	Minerul Câmpulung (R)	30	3	8	19	20	56	−36	14	Relegation to County Championship
16	CIL Râmnicu Vâlcea (R)	30	5	4	21	18	63	−45	14	Relegation to County Championship

Source: romaniansoccer.ro
Rules for classification: 1) points; 2) goal difference; 3) number of goals scored.
(C) Champions; (R) Relegated

=== Seria V ===
Pos	Team	Pld	W	D	L	GF	GA	GD	Pts	Promotion or relegation
1	Minerul Anina (C)	30	18	5	7	62	12	+50	41	Qualification to promotion play-off
2	Minerul Lupeni	30	17	4	9	58	26	+32	38	
3	UM Timișoara	30	15	6	9	63	32	+31	36	
4	Victoria Caransebeș	30	13	7	10	33	29	+4	33	
5	Voința Lugoj	30	14	3	13	41	37	+4	31	
6	Minerul Bocșa Montană	30	14	2	14	48	52	−4	30	
7	Minerul Motru	30	12	6	12	37	48	−11	30	
8	Metalul Topleț	30	14	1	15	47	62	−15	29	
9	Progresul Strehaia	30	11	7	12	31	49	−18	29	
10	Furnirul Deta	30	13	2	15	39	48	−9	28	
11	Victoria Târgu Jiu	30	11	5	14	46	42	+4	27	
12	Steagul Roșu Plenița	30	12	3	15	35	38	−3	27	
13	Dunărea Calafat	30	12	2	16	43	59	−16	26	
14	Energia Drobeta-Turnu Severin	30	12	2	16	37	56	−19	26	
15	Autorapid Craiova (R)	30	8	9	13	32	46	−14	25	Relegation to County Championship
16	Șoimii Timișoara (R)	30	8	8	14	27	43	−16	24	Relegation to County Championship

Source: romaniansoccer.ro
Rules for classification: 1) points; 2) goal difference; 3) number of goals scored.
(C) Champions; (R) Relegated

=== Seria VI ===
Pos	Team	Pld	W	D	L	GF	GA	GD	Pts	Promotion or relegation
1	Știința Petroșani (C)	30	15	8	7	46	22	+24	38	Qualification to promotion play-off
2	Aurul Zlatna	30	16	5	9	53	32	+21	37	
3	Metalul Copșa Mică	30	13	8	9	53	41	+12	34	
4	Aurul Brad	30	15	3	12	37	43	−6	33	
5	Victoria Călan	30	15	2	13	47	44	+3	32	
6	Mureșul Deva	30	13	5	12	39	35	+4	31	
7	Arieșul Turda	30	13	4	13	47	33	+14	30	
8	ASA Sibiu	30	12	6	12	39	37	+2	30	
9	Soda Ocna Mureș	30	12	5	13	50	50	0	29	
10	Minerul Ghelar	30	14	1	15	41	46	−5	29	
11	Tehnofrig Cluj-Napoca	30	12	3	15	37	36	+1	27	
12	Minerul Baia de Arieș	30	11	5	14	39	55	−16	27	
13	Arieșul Câmpia Turzii	30	10	6	14	34	37	−3	26	
14	Metalul Aiud	30	11	4	15	40	45	−5	26	
15	Progresul Sibiu (R)	30	11	4	15	29	45	−16	26	Relegation to County Championship
16	Mureșul Luduș (R)	30	9	7	14	31	61	−30	25	Relegation to County Championship

Source: romaniansoccer.ro
Rules for classification: 1) points; 2) goal difference; 3) number of goals scored.
(C) Champions; (R) Relegated

=== Seria VII ===
Pos	Team	Pld	W	D	L	GF	GA	GD	Pts	Promotion or relegation
1	Olimpia Satu Mare (C)	30	20	9	1	61	14	+47	49	Qualification to promotion play-off
2	Victoria Carei	30	19	8	3	74	18	+56	46	
3	Unirea Dej	30	15	5	10	69	32	+37	35	
4	Gloria Bistrița	30	14	6	10	57	29	+28	34	
5	CIL Gherla	30	13	3	14	38	38	0	29	
6	Unirea Oradea	30	12	5	13	27	40	−13	29	
7	Someșul Satu Mare	30	11	6	13	46	46	0	28	
8	CIL Sighetu Marmației	30	11	6	13	33	49	−16	28	
9	Constructorul Baia Mare	30	10	7	13	34	49	−15	27	
10	Dacia Oradea	30	11	4	15	38	45	−7	26	
11	Metalul Salonta	30	11	4	15	31	42	−11	26	
12	Bihoreana Marghita	30	10	6	14	18	45	−27	26	
13	Dinamo Oradea	30	10	5	15	28	30	−2	25	
14	Topitorul Baia Mare	30	10	5	15	35	63	−28	25	
15	Bradul Vișeu de Sus (R)	30	10	4	16	27	51	−24	24	Relegation to County Championship
16	Minerul Baia Sprie (R)	30	10	3	17	39	64	−25	23	Relegation to County Championship

Source: romaniansoccer.ro
Rules for classification: 1) points; 2) goal difference; 3) number of goals scored.
(C) Champions; (R) Relegated

=== Seria VIII ===
Pos	Team	Pld	W	D	L	GF	GA	GD	Pts	Promotion or relegation
1	Chimia Făgăraș (C)	30	20	3	7	69	28	+41	43	Qualification to promotion play-off
2	Tractorul Brașov	30	16	8	6	63	21	+42	40	
3	Oltul Sfântu Gheorghe	30	16	8	6	61	30	+31	40	
4	Lemnarul Odorheiu Secuiesc	30	16	4	10	58	38	+20	36	
5	Chimica Târnăveni	30	15	3	12	55	39	+16	33	
6	Torpedo Zărnești	30	12	7	11	42	40	+2	31	
7	Avântul Reghin	30	13	3	14	44	60	−16	29	
8	Unirea Cristuru Secuiesc	30	11	5	14	43	49	−6	27	
9	Carpați Brașov	30	10	7	13	39	47	−8	27	
10	Colorom Codlea	30	10	6	14	34	45	−11	26	
11	Medicina Târgu Mureș	30	9	8	13	37	50	−13	26	
12	Vitrometan Mediaș	30	10	6	14	35	55	−20	26	
13	Chimia Orașul Victoria	30	9	7	14	34	60	−26	25	
14	Minerul Bălan	30	9	6	15	40	51	−11	24	
15	Voința Târnăveni (R)	30	10	4	16	33	57	−24	24	Relegation to County Championship
16	CFR Sighișoara (R)	30	9	5	16	39	56	−17	23	Relegation to County Championship

Source: romaniansoccer.ro
Rules for classification: 1) points; 2) goal difference; 3) number of goals scored.
(C) Champions; (R) Relegated

== Promotion play-off ==
=== Group I (București) ===
Pos	Team	Pld	W	D	L	GF	GA	GD	Pts	Promotion or relegation
1	Metalul Târgoviște (P)	3	2	1	0	10	4	+6	5	Promotion to Divizia B
2	Știința Bacău (P)	3	2	0	1	2	5	−3	4	Promotion to Divizia B
3	Metalul Plopeni	3	0	2	1	4	5	−1	2	
4	IMU Medgidia	3	0	1	2	4	6	−2	1	

(P) Promoted

=== Group II (Cluj) ===
Pos	Team	Pld	W	D	L	GF	GA	GD	Pts	Promotion or relegation
1	Olimpia Satu Mare (P)	3	2	1	0	7	4	+3	5	Promotion to Divizia B
2	Minerul Anina (P)	3	1	2	0	4	3	+1	4	Promotion to Divizia B
3	Chimia Făgăraș	3	0	2	1	5	6	−1	2	
4	Știința Petroșani	3	0	1	2	2	5	−3	1	

(P) Promoted

== See also ==
- 1968–69 Divizia A
- 1968–69 Divizia B
- 1968–69 County Championship
- 1968–69 Cupa României
