= 1965–66 Regional Championship =

24th season of the Liga IV, the fourth tier of the Romanian football league

Liga IV
- Season: 1965–66

The 1965–66 Regional Championship was the 24th season of the Liga IV, the fourth tier of the Romanian football league system. The champions of Regional Championships play against each other in the playoffs to earn promotion to Divizia C.

== Regional championships ==
- Argeș (AG)
- Bacău (BC)
- Banat (BA)
- Brașov (BV)
- Bucharest Municipality (B)
- Bucharest Region (B)
- Cluj (CJ)
- Crișana (CR)
- Dobrogea (DO)
- Galați (GL)
- Hunedoara (HD)
- Iași (IS)
- Maramureș (MM)
- Mureș (MS)
- Oltenia (OT)
- Ploiești (PL)
- Suceava (SV)

== Promotion play-off ==
Preliminary round

The matches were played on 26 June and 3 July 1966.

Team 1	Series	Team 2	Game 1	Game 2	Game 3
ASA Sibiu (BV)	3–1	(B) Dinamo Obor București	2–0	1–1	

Play-off round

The matches were played on 10, 17 and 21 July 1966.

Team 1	Series	Team 2	Game 1	Game 2	Game 3
Ancora Galați (GL)	7–1	(SV) Textila Botoșani	3–0	4–1	
Gloria Bârlad (IS)	4–2	(BC) Victoria Bacău	3–0	1–2	
Metalul Pitești (AG)	2–8	(PL) Metalul Buzău	2–3	0–5	
Metalul Oțelu Roșu (BA)	2–3	(OT) Autorapid Craiova	2–0	0–3	
Gloria Ioșia (CR)	3–5	(HD) Aurul Zlatna	1–1	2–4	
Topitorul Baia Mare (MM)	4–5	(CJ) Medicina Cluj	2–0	1–3	1–2 (Note: The match was played on neutral ground at Oradea.)
Stuful Tulcea (DO)	6–1	(B) Celuloza Călărași	5–0	1–1	
ASA Sibiu (BV)	3–2	(MS) Confecția Odorheiu Secuiesc	3–0	0–2	

== Championships standings ==
=== Argeș Region ===
Pos	Team	Pld	W	D	L	GF	GA	GD	Pts	Qualification or relegation
1	Metalul Pitești (C, Q)	26	17	7	2	84	15	+69	41	Qualification to promotion play-off
2	Forestierul Stâlpeni	26	18	2	6	61	21	+40	38	
3	Aluminiu Slatina	26	13	9	4	58	23	+35	35	
4	Unirea Drăgășani	26	12	7	7	36	27	+9	31	
5	Forestierul Curtea de Argeș	26	12	5	9	41	34	+7	29	
6	Lotru Brezoi	26	9	9	8	38	31	+7	27	
7	Oltul Drăgănești-Olt	26	11	5	10	43	48	−5	27	
8	Recolta Stoicănești	26	11	5	10	36	45	−9	27	
9	Progresul Găești	26	9	5	12	33	49	−16	23	
10	Unirea Horezu	26	7	7	12	29	48	−19	21	
11	Vâlceana Râmnicu Vâlcea	26	7	5	14	25	57	−32	19	
12	Chimia Govora	26	6	6	14	46	61	−15	18	
13	Progresul Băiculești	26	7	3	16	25	44	−19	17	
14	Tractorul Drăgășani	26	3	5	18	18	70	−52	11	

Rules for classification: 1) points; 2) goal difference; 3) number of goals scored.
(C) Champions; (Q) Qualified for the phase indicated

=== Bacău Region ===
Pos	Team	Pld	W	D	L	GF	GA	GD	Pts	Qualification or relegation
1	Victoria Bacău (C, Q)	26	14	8	4	57	23	+34	36	Qualification to promotion play-off
2	Viitorul Comănești	26	14	7	5	53	21	+32	35	
3	Petrolistul Dărmănești	26	14	5	7	36	29	+7	33	
4	Steaua Roșie Bacău	26	14	4	8	45	37	+8	32	
5	Spartac Bacău	26	10	6	10	41	37	+4	26	
6	Viitorul Săvinești	26	11	4	11	37	40	−3	26	
7	Progresul Gheorghe Gheorghiu-Dej	26	10	5	11	37	36	+1	25	
8	Bradul Roznov	26	9	5	12	35	39	−4	23	
9	Cimentul Bicaz	26	10	3	13	36	41	−5	23	
10	Unirea Roman	26	8	6	12	36	41	−5	22	
11	Gloria Zemeș	26	9	4	13	38	52	−14	22	
12	Cetatea Târgu Neamț (R)	26	9	4	13	37	56	−19	22	Relegation to Bacău District Championship
13	Oituz Târgu Ocna (R)	26	9	4	13	36	57	−21	22	Relegation to Bacău District Championship
14	Locomotiva Adjud (R)	26	8	1	17	28	63	−35	17	Relegation to Bacău District Championship

Rules for classification: 1) points; 2) goal difference; 3) number of goals scored.
(C) Champions; (Q) Qualified for the phase indicated; (R) Relegated

=== Banat Region ===
North Series

Pos	Team	Pld	W	D	L	GF	GA	GD	Pts	Qualification or relegation
1	Furnirul Deta (Q)	22	14	5	3	42	17	+25	33	Qualification to championship final
2	Șoimii Timișoara	22	12	5	5	42	26	+16	29	
3	UM Timișoara	22	9	10	3	50	17	+33	28	
4	Progresul Ciacova	22	12	2	8	37	31	+6	26	
5	ICA Arad	22	10	5	7	35	26	+9	25	
6	Ceramica Jimbolia	22	9	5	8	28	28	0	23	
7	Teba Arad	21	7	7	7	40	24	+16	21	
8	Unirea Sânnicolau Mare	22	7	6	9	31	35	−4	20	
9	Progresul Pecica	22	6	8	8	33	39	−6	20	
10	Chimia Margina	21	7	4	10	33	52	−19	18	
11	CFR Șoimii Lugoj	21	2	5	14	15	51	−36	9	
12	Luptătorul Lipova	21	2	4	15	14	54	−40	8	

Rules for classification: 1) points; 2) goal difference; 3) number of goals scored.
(Q) Qualified for the phase indicated

South Series

Pos	Team	Pld	W	D	L	GF	GA	GD	Pts	Qualification or relegation
1	Metalul Oțelu Roșu (Q)	22	12	8	2	52	11	+41	32	Qualification to championship final
2	Metalul Bocșa	22	12	5	5	47	21	+26	29	
3	Minerul Bocșa	22	10	6	6	35	23	+12	26	
4	Dinamo Timișoara	22	11	3	8	33	26	+7	25	
5	Metalul Topleț	21	11	2	8	37	43	−6	24	
6	Progresul Timișoara	22	7	6	9	34	40	−6	20	
7	Nera Bozovici	21	9	1	11	30	42	−12	19	
8	Muncitorul Reșița	22	7	4	11	31	36	−5	18	
9	Agmonia Zăvoi	22	7	4	11	27	38	−11	18	
10	Laminorul Nădrag	22	7	3	12	32	42	−10	17	
11	Oravița	22	6	5	11	31	47	−16	17	
12	Minerul Moldova Nouă	22	8	1	13	23	43	−20	17	

Rules for classification: 1) points; 2) goal difference; 3) number of goals scored.
(Q) Qualified for the phase indicated

Championship final

Team 1	Agg.	Team 2	1st leg	2nd leg
Furnirul Deta	4–4	Metalul Oțelu Roșu	2–2	1–3

Metalul Oțelu Roșu won the Banat Regional Championship and qualify to promotion play-off in Divizia C.

=== Crișana Region ===
North Series

Pos	Team	Pld	W	D	L	GF	GA	GD	Pts	Qualification or relegation
1	Gloria Ioșia (Q)	22	16	5	1	54	17	+37	37	Qualification to championship final
2	Metalul Oradea	22	12	7	3	45	22	+23	31	
3	Stăruința Săcuieni	22	10	7	5	43	28	+15	27	
4	Unirea Tileagd	22	10	6	6	45	19	+26	26	
5	Minerul Sărmășag	21	8	6	7	25	26	−1	22	
6	Minerul Voivozi	21	8	6	7	33	35	−2	22	
7	Recolta Valea lui Mihai	22	7	6	9	41	37	+4	20	
8	Măgura Șimleu Silvaniei	22	7	4	11	19	35	−16	18	
9	Minerul Ip	22	6	5	11	27	52	−25	17	
10	Recolta Sălard	22	5	6	11	24	33	−9	16	
11	Bihoreana Marghita	22	5	5	12	28	42	−14	15	Spared from relegation
12	Înfrățirea Oradea (Note: Înfrățirea Oradea was excluded due to repeated no-shows.) (R)	22	3	5	14	20	48	−28	11	Relegation to Crișana District Championship

Rules for classification: 1) Points; 2) Goal difference; 3) Number of goals scored.
(Q) Qualified for the phase indicated; (R) Relegated
Notes:

South Series

Pos	Team	Pld	W	D	L	GF	GA	GD	Pts	Qualification or relegation
1	Victoria Chișineu-Criș (Q)	20	15	4	1	53	11	+42	34	Qualification to championship final
2	Dinamo Oradea	20	10	6	4	44	19	+25	26	
3	Crișul Ineu	20	12	2	6	35	26	+9	26	
4	Avântul Beliu	20	10	2	8	45	26	+19	22	
5	Victoria Ineu	20	8	5	7	34	25	+9	21	
6	Unirea Sântana	20	8	5	7	35	30	+5	21	
7	Steaua Roșie Beiuș	20	8	5	7	34	30	+4	21	
8	Voința Inand	20	6	4	10	24	34	−10	16	
9	Crișana Sebiș	20	4	6	10	15	41	−26	14	
10	Recolta Buteni	20	4	3	13	15	35	−20	11	
11	Stăruința Satu Nou (R)	20	3	1	16	20	79	−59	7	Relegation to Crișana District Championship

Rules for classification: 1) Points; 2) Goal difference; 3) Number of goals scored.
(Q) Qualified for the phase indicated; (R) Relegated

Championship final

The matches were played on 5 and 12 June 1966.

Team 1	Agg.	Team 2	1st leg	2nd leg
Victoria Chișineu-Criș	0–1	Gloria Ioșia	0–0	0–1

Gloria Ioșia won the Crișana Regional Championship and qualify to promotion play-off in Divizia C.

=== Dobrogea Region ===
Pos	Team	Pld	W	D	L	GF	GA	GD	Pts	Qualification or relegation
1	Stuful Tulcea (C, Q)	26	19	3	4	65	21	+44	41	Qualification to promotion play-off
2	Știința Constanța	26	17	6	3	53	26	+27	40	
3	Cimentul Medgidia	26	15	8	3	48	13	+35	38	
4	Ideal Cernavodă	26	11	8	7	36	21	+15	30	
5	ITC Constanța	26	8	11	7	42	32	+10	27	
6	Celuloza Constanța	26	9	8	9	28	27	+1	26	
7	Victoria Saligny	26	11	4	11	29	29	0	26	
8	Petrolul Constanța	26	9	6	11	28	35	−7	24	
9	USAS Năvodari	26	6	11	9	30	31	−1	23	
10	CFR Constanța	26	9	5	12	34	37	−3	23	
11	Callatis Mangalia	26	8	5	13	26	46	−20	21	
12	Unirea Murfatlar	26	6	5	15	29	48	−19	17	
13	Recolta Negru Vodă	26	5	7	14	21	57	−36	17	
14	Dinamo Constanța	26	5	1	20	24	70	−46	11	

Rules for classification: 1) points; 2) goal difference; 3) number of goals scored.
(C) Champions; (Q) Qualified for the phase indicated

=== Galați Region ===
Pos	Team	Pld	W	D	L	GF	GA	GD	Pts	Qualification or relegation
1	Ancora Galați (C, Q)	24	19	3	2	58	12	+46	41	Qualification to promotion play-off
2	Gloria CFR Galați	24	12	6	6	53	30	+23	30	
3	Chimica Mărășești	24	13	3	8	45	31	+14	29	
4	SUT Galați	24	13	1	10	50	28	+22	27	
5	Foresta Gugești	24	10	5	9	51	40	+11	25	
6	Laminorul Brăila	24	10	4	10	39	37	+2	24	
7	Celuloza Brăila	24	11	2	11	34	40	−6	24	
8	Viitorul Rușețu	24	10	3	11	34	48	−14	23	
9	Progresul Brăila	24	11	0	13	34	46	−12	22	
10	Tractorul Viziru	24	7	6	11	46	49	−3	20	
11	Dunărea Brăila	24	7	4	13	38	52	−14	18	
12	Unirea Bărăganul (R)	24	4	6	14	23	58	−35	14	Relegation to Galați District Championship
13	Avântul Bujor (R)	24	4	5	15	25	65	−40	13	Relegation to Galați District Championship
14	Dinamo Tecuci (Note: Dinamo Tecuci withdrew during the season and all its results were canceled.) (D)	0	0	0	0	0	0	0	0	Withdrew

Rules for classification: 1) points; 2) goal difference; 3) number of goals scored.
(C) Champions; (D) Disqualified; (Q) Qualified for the phase indicated; (R) Relegated

=== Hunedoara Region ===
Pos	Team	Pld	W	D	L	GF	GA	GD	Pts	Qualification or relegation
1	Aurul Zlatna (C, Q)	26	16	4	6	50	22	+28	36	Qualification to promotion play-off
2	Aurul Brad	26	16	2	8	52	19	+33	34	
3	Știința Petroșani	26	14	4	8	63	25	+38	32	
4	Constructorul Hunedoara	26	12	3	11	48	40	+8	27	
5	Refractara Alba Iulia	26	12	1	13	36	33	+3	25	
6	Parângul Lonea	26	10	5	11	33	41	−8	25	
7	Minerul Ghelar	26	12	1	13	47	66	−19	25	
8	Minerul Teliuc	26	11	2	13	54	52	+2	24	
9	Minerul Vulcan	26	10	4	12	35	48	−13	24	
10	Minerul Aninoasa	26	8	7	11	41	49	−8	23	
11	CFR Simeria	26	10	3	13	35	61	−26	23	
12	Dacia Orăștie	26	9	4	13	41	44	−3	22	
13	Textila Sebeș	26	10	2	14	54	67	−13	22	
14	CFR Teiuș	26	10	2	14	39	61	−22	22	

Rules for classification: 1) points; 2) goal difference; 3) number of goals scored.
(C) Champions; (Q) Qualified for the phase indicated

=== Mureș Region ===
Series I

Pos	Team	Pld	W	D	L	GF	GA	GD	Pts	Qualification or relegation
1	Confecția Odorheiu Secuiesc (Q)	22	17	2	3	58	15	+43	36	Qualification to championship final
2	Lemnarul Târgu Mureș	22	13	6	3	48	27	+21	32	
3	Apemin Borsec	22	12	6	4	40	19	+21	30	
4	Viitorul Gheorgheni	22	11	6	5	37	25	+12	28	
5	Mureșul Toplița	22	11	3	8	29	27	+2	25	
6	Lemnarul Odorheiu Secuiesc	22	7	6	9	28	24	+4	20	
7	Gloria Târgu Mureș	22	8	3	11	36	39	−3	19	
8	Metalul Vlăhița	22	7	3	12	25	42	−17	17	
9	Minerul Bălan	22	6	5	11	27	49	−22	17	
10	Minerul Miercurea Ciuc	22	5	4	13	29	47	−18	14	
11	Complexul Gălăuțaș	22	5	4	13	17	37	−20	14	
12	Voința Târgu Mureș	22	4	4	14	23	46	−23	12	

Rules for classification: 1) points; 2) goal difference; 3) number of goals scored.
(Q) Qualified for the phase indicated

Series II

Pos	Team	Pld	W	D	L	GF	GA	GD	Pts	Qualification or relegation
1	Oțelul Târgu Mureș (Q)	22	14	3	5	57	26	+31	31	Qualification to championship final
2	Mureșul Luduș	22	12	4	6	50	32	+18	28	
3	Străduința Cristuru Secuiesc	22	12	2	8	50	37	+13	26	
4	Știința Târgu Mureș	22	10	6	6	38	25	+13	26	
5	Ciocanul Târgu Mureș	22	10	5	7	38	27	+11	25	
6	Energia Fântânele	22	9	5	8	48	36	+12	23	
7	Unirea Târnăveni	22	10	2	10	32	32	0	22	
8	Avântul Reghin	22	7	4	11	34	50	−16	18	
9	Nirajul Miercurea Nirajului	22	6	6	10	32	51	−19	18	
10	Vulturul Luduș	22	7	3	12	25	56	−31	17	
11	Stăruința Târgu Mureș	22	5	6	11	27	40	−13	16	
12	Voința Târnăveni	22	6	3	13	29	43	−14	15	

Rules for classification: 1) points; 2) goal difference; 3) number of goals scored.
(Q) Qualified for the phase indicated

Championship final

The matches were played on 12 and 19 June 1966.

Team 1	Agg.	Team 2	1st leg	2nd leg
Oțelul Târgu Mureș	2–4	Confecția Odorheiu Secuiesc	2–3	0–1

Confecția Odorheiu Secuiesc won the Mureș Regional Championship and qualify to promotion play-off in Divizia C.

=== Oltenia Region ===
Series I

Pos	Team	Pld	W	D	L	GF	GA	GD	Pts	Qualification or relegation
1	Dunărea Calafat (C, Q)	22	17	2	3	68	16	+52	36	Qualification to championship final
2	Răsăritul Caracal	22	16	3	3	57	17	+40	35	
3	Recolta Urzicuța	22	11	2	9	37	28	+9	24	
4	Metalul Craiova	22	9	6	7	26	21	+5	24	
5	Progresul Cîrcea	22	8	7	7	37	36	+1	23	
6	Progresul Balș	21	10	2	9	32	28	+4	22	
7	Unirea Caracal	21	7	6	8	28	31	−3	20	
8	Stăruința Craiova	22	8	4	10	30	41	−11	20	
9	Steagul Roșu Plenița	21	9	1	11	29	38	−9	19	
10	Gloria Băilești	21	5	5	11	31	40	−9	15	
11	Tractorul Băicești	22	6	3	13	28	46	−18	15	
12	Unirea Dioști	22	3	1	18	19	80	−61	7	

Rules for classification: 1) Points; 2) Goal difference; 3) Number of goals scored.
(C) Champions; (Q) Qualified for the phase indicated

Series II

Pos	Team	Pld	W	D	L	GF	GA	GD	Pts	Qualification or relegation
1	Autorapid Craiova (C, Q)	21	14	5	2	77	17	+60	33	Qualification to championship final
2	Minerul Motru	21	12	3	6	52	16	+36	27	
3	Sănătatea Târgu Jiu	21	12	3	6	58	25	+33	27	
4	SMT Șimian	21	12	2	7	49	30	+19	26	
5	Armata Craiova	21	10	5	6	48	32	+16	25	
6	Drubeta Turnu Severin	21	10	4	7	39	32	+7	24	
7	Metalurgistul Sadu	21	10	4	7	31	32	−1	24	
8	Olimpia Filiași	21	7	3	11	25	69	−44	17	
9	Victoria Vânju Mare	21	6	2	13	31	43	−12	14	
10	Petrolul Târgu Cărbunești	21	4	5	12	23	51	−28	13	
11	Minerul Rovinari	21	3	4	14	20	70	−50	10	
12	Recolta Halînga	11	0	2	9	7	43	−36	2	

Rules for classification: 1) Points; 2) Goal difference; 3) Number of goals scored.
(C) Champions; (Q) Qualified for the phase indicated

Championship final

The matches were played on 12 and 19 June 1966.

Team 1	Agg.	Team 2	1st leg	2nd leg
Dunărea Calafat	3–4	Autorapid Craiova	1–0	2–4

Autorapid Craiova won the Oltenia Regional Championship and qualify to promotion play-off in Divizia C.

=== Ploiești Region ===
East Series

Pos	Team	Pld	W	D	L	GF	GA	GD	Pts	Qualification or relegation
1	Metalul Buzău (Q)	22	16	5	1	50	12	+38	37	Qualification to championship final
2	Prahova Ploiești	22	15	5	2	36	12	+24	35	
3	Vagonul Ploiești	22	11	5	6	36	22	+14	27	
4	Rafinăria Teleajen	22	9	7	6	31	21	+10	25	
5	Armata Ploiești	22	9	6	7	27	17	+10	24	
6	Petrolistul Boldești	22	8	5	9	20	30	−10	21	
7	Foresta Nehoiu	22	8	4	10	31	36	−5	20	
8	Progresul Râmnicu Sărat	22	7	6	9	28	40	−12	20	
9	Victoria Boboc	22	7	5	10	33	31	+2	19	
10	Petrolul Berca	22	7	4	11	19	31	−12	18	
11	Feroemail Ploiești	22	4	6	12	13	26	−13	14	
12	Olimpia Slănic	22	0	4	18	9	63	−54	4	

Rules for classification: 1) points; 2) goal difference; 3) number of goals scored.
(Q) Qualified for the phase indicated

West Series

Pos	Team	Pld	W	D	L	GF	GA	GD	Pts	Qualification or relegation
1	Metalul Plopeni (Q)	22	16	2	4	55	25	+30	34	Qualification to championship final
2	Carpați Sinaia	22	14	3	5	37	15	+22	31	
3	Caraimanul Bușteni	22	11	5	6	38	29	+9	27	
4	IRA Câmpina	22	10	5	7	42	30	+12	25	
5	Bucegi Pucioasa	22	9	7	6	30	29	+1	25	
6	Muncitorul Schela Mare	22	8	6	8	37	43	−6	22	
7	Rafinăria Câmpina	22	8	1	13	30	32	−2	17	
8	Victoria Florești	22	7	3	12	31	34	−3	17	
9	Victoria Moreni	22	8	1	13	32	37	−5	17	
10	Cimentul Fieni	22	6	5	11	20	37	−17	17	
11	Dinamo Caragiale	22	8	1	13	26	47	−21	17	
12	Electrica Câmpina	22	7	1	14	22	42	−20	15	

Rules for classification: 1) points; 2) goal difference; 3) number of goals scored.
(Q) Qualified for the phase indicated

Championship final

The matches were played on 19, 26 and 29 June 1966.

Team 1	Series	Team 2	Game 1	Game 2	Game 3
Metalul Plopeni	4–4 (Note: Metalul Buzău won due to the younger average age.)	Metalul Buzău	3–0	0–3	1–1 (Note: The match was played on neutral ground at Petrolul Stadium in Ploiești.)

Metalul Buzău won the Ploiești Regional Championship and qualify to promotion play-off in Divizia C.

=== Suceava Region ===
Pos	Team	Pld	W	D	L	GF	GA	GD	Pts	Qualification or relegation
1	Textila Botoșani (C, Q)	26	16	5	5	72	23	+49	37	Qualification to promotion play-off
2	CFR Suceava	26	16	4	6	66	31	+35	36	
3	Viitorul Botoșani	26	14	4	8	63	32	+31	32	
4	Avântul Frasin	25	14	4	7	45	35	+10	32	
5	Bradul Vama	26	10	6	10	37	36	+1	26	
6	Foresta Moldovița	26	11	4	11	43	45	−2	26	
7	Cooperatorul Fălticeni	26	11	3	12	47	48	−1	25	
8	Forestierul Falcău	26	9	5	12	50	50	0	23	
9	Foresta Gura Humorului	26	11	1	14	42	54	−12	23	
10	Unirea Siret	26	9	4	13	59	72	−13	22	
11	Tractorul Săveni	25	10	2	13	45	75	−30	22	
12	Fulgerul Dorohoi	26	9	3	14	42	71	−29	21	
13	Feroviarul Câmpulung Moldovenesc	26	9	1	16	42	53	−11	19	
14	Tractorul Salcea	26	8	2	16	36	64	−28	18	

Rules for classification: 1) points; 2) goal difference; 3) number of goals scored.
(C) Champions; (Q) Qualified for the phase indicated

== See also ==
- 1965–66 Divizia A
- 1965–66 Divizia B
- 1965–66 Divizia C
- 1965–66 Cupa României
