= 1965–66 Divizia C =

Third tier Romanian football league

Divizia C
- Season: 1965–66
- Champions: Chimia Suceava Metrom Brașov CFR Timișoara Unirea Dej
- Promoted: Chimia Suceava Metrom Brașov CFR Timișoara Unirea Dej
- Relegated: Chimia Gheorghe Gheorghiu-Dej Unirea Negrești Marina Mangalia Rulmentul Brașov Electromotor Timișoara Minerul Câmpulung Gloria Bistrița Forestiera Sighetu Marmației

The 1965–66 Divizia C was the 10th season of Liga III, the third tier of the Romanian football league system.

The format has been maintained to four series, each of them having 14 teams. At the end of the season the winners of the series promoted to Divizia B and the last two places from each series relegated to Regional Championship.

== Team changes ==
=== To Divizia C ===
Relegated from Divizia B

- Tractorul Brașov
- Sătmăreana Satu Mare
- Chimia Făgăraș
- CFR Timișoara

Promoted from Regional Championship

- Minobrad Vatra Dornei
- IMU Medgidia
- Unirea Negrești
- CFR Caransebeș
- Șantierul Naval Oltenița
- Progresul Reghin
- Progresul Strehaia
- Metalul Copșa Micǎ

=== From Divizia C ===
Promoted to Divizia B

- Ceahlăul Piatra Neamț
- Dinamo Victoria București
- CFR Arad
- Arieșul Turda

Relegated to Regional Championship

- Textila Botoșani
- Rulmentul Bârlad
- Unirea Răcari
- Progresul Alexandria
- Teba Arad
- Metalul Pitești
- Topitorul Baia Mare
- Unirea Târgu Mureș

=== Renamed teams ===
Victoria Piatra Neamț was moved from Piatra Neamț to Roman and renamed as Victoria Roman.

Dinamo Moldova Iași was renamed as Locomotiva Iași.

Viitorul Suceava was renamed as Chimia Suceava.

Textila Sfântu Gheorghe was renamed as Oltul Sfântu Gheorghe.

Victoria Giurgiu was renamed as Dunărea Giurgiu.

Tractorul Corabia was renamed as Progresul Corabia.

Pandurii Târgu Jiu was renamed as Victoria Târgu Jiu.

Foresta Sighetu Marmației was renamed as Forestiera Sighetu Marmației.

== League tables ==
=== East Series ===
Pos	Team	Pld	W	D	L	GF	GA	GD	Pts	Promotion or relegation
1	Chimia Suceava (C, P)	26	14	7	5	41	27	+14	35	Promotion to Divizia B
2	Petrolul Moinești	26	12	7	7	33	23	+10	31	
3	Locomotiva Iași	26	13	4	9	36	29	+7	30	
4	Flamura Roșie Tecuci	26	12	5	9	42	31	+11	29	
5	Fructexport Focșani	26	14	1	11	43	36	+7	29	
6	Textila Buhuși	26	13	2	11	47	35	+12	28	
7	Victoria Roman	26	12	2	12	43	32	+11	26	
8	Metalul Rădăuți	26	11	4	11	31	31	0	26	
9	Foresta Fălticeni	26	11	3	12	37	40	−3	25	
10	Minobrad Vatra Dornei	26	11	3	12	34	40	−6	25	
11	Rapid Mizil	26	9	6	11	30	37	−7	24	
12	Metalosport Galați	26	9	5	12	27	30	−3	23	
13	Chimia Gheorghe Gheorghiu-Dej (R)	26	9	2	15	26	43	−17	20	Relegation to Regional Championship
14	Unirea Negrești (R)	26	4	5	17	11	47	−36	13	Relegation to Regional Championship

Source: romaniansoccer.ro
(C) Champions; (P) Promoted; (R) Relegated

=== South Series ===
Pos	Team	Pld	W	D	L	GF	GA	GD	Pts	Promotion or relegation
1	Metrom Brașov (C, P)	26	14	6	6	42	26	+16	34	Promotion to Divizia B
2	Tractorul Brașov	26	12	7	7	45	30	+15	31	
3	Portul Constanța	26	10	8	8	41	35	+6	28	
4	IMU Medgidia	26	10	8	8	33	28	+5	28	
5	Dunărea Giurgiu	26	10	8	8	24	23	+1	28	
6	Șantierul Naval Oltenița	26	9	10	7	25	32	−7	28	
7	Chimia Făgăraș	26	12	2	12	45	44	+1	26	
8	Tehnometal București	26	9	7	10	39	38	+1	25	
9	Flacăra Roșie București	26	10	5	11	35	40	−5	25	
10	Oltul Sfântu Gheorghe	26	8	9	9	23	32	−9	25	
11	Electrica Constanța	26	9	6	11	35	31	+4	24	
12	Electrica Fieni	26	9	5	12	34	37	−3	23	
13	Marina Mangalia (R)	26	8	7	11	31	38	−7	23	Relegation to Regional Championship
14	Rulmentul Brașov (R)	26	6	4	16	35	53	−18	16	Relegation to Regional Championship

Source: romaniansoccer.ro
(C) Champions; (P) Promoted; (R) Relegated

=== West Series ===
Pos	Team	Pld	W	D	L	GF	GA	GD	Pts	Promotion or relegation
1	CFR Timișoara (C, P)	26	17	4	5	67	31	+36	38	Promotion to Divizia B
2	Metalul Hunedoara	26	15	3	8	58	22	+36	33	
3	Victoria Târgu Jiu	26	13	7	6	49	22	+27	33	
4	Electroputere Craiova	26	13	4	9	56	30	+26	30	
5	Minerul Deva	26	12	4	10	34	32	+2	28	
6	Minerul Anina	26	10	7	9	29	27	+2	27	
7	Metalul Drobeta-Turnu Severin	26	12	2	12	34	46	−12	26	
8	CFR Caransebeș	26	11	3	12	33	39	−6	25	
9	Progresul Strehaia	26	11	3	12	33	60	−27	25	
10	Victoria Călan	26	9	5	12	32	33	−1	23	
11	Muscelul Câmpulung	26	10	3	13	30	40	−10	23	
12	Progresul Corabia	26	9	5	12	30	42	−12	23	
13	Electromotor Timișoara (R)	26	8	5	13	43	48	−5	21	Relegation to Regional Championship
14	Minerul Câmpulung (R)	26	2	5	19	8	64	−56	9	Relegation to Regional Championship

Source: romaniansoccer.ro
(C) Champions; (P) Promoted; (R) Relegated

=== North Series ===
Pos	Team	Pld	W	D	L	GF	GA	GD	Pts	Promotion or relegation
1	Unirea Dej	26	13	5	8	42	34	+8	31	Promotion to Divizia B
2	Soda Ocna Mureș	26	12	6	8	43	29	+14	30	
3	Progresul Reghin	26	13	4	9	47	40	+7	30	
4	Steaua Roșie Salonta	26	10	8	8	36	43	−7	28	
5	Minerul Baia Sprie	26	10	7	9	47	42	+5	27	
6	AS Aiud	26	8	11	7	37	35	+2	27	
7	Chimica Târnăveni	26	10	6	10	25	24	+1	26	
8	Minerul Dr. Petru Groza	26	10	5	11	46	42	+4	25	
9	Sătmăreana Satu Mare	26	10	5	11	35	38	−3	25	
10	Faianța Sighisoara	26	11	3	12	35	42	−7	25	
11	Olimpia Oradea	26	9	6	11	37	35	+2	24	
12	Metalul Copșa Mică	26	11	2	13	37	39	−2	24	
13	Gloria Bistrița (R)	26	10	4	12	37	39	−2	24	Relegation to Regional Championship
14	Forestiera Sighetu Marmației (R)	26	9	0	17	31	53	−22	18	Relegation to Regional Championship

Source: romaniansoccer.ro
(R) Relegated

== See also ==
- 1965–66 Divizia A
- 1965–66 Divizia B
- 1965–66 Regional Championship
- 1965–66 Cupa României
