= List of FC U Craiova 1948 players =

Below is a list of footballers who have made 100 or more appearances for FC Universitatea Craiova. Players are listed according to the year in which they made their first-team debut.

Name	Nationality	Position	Club career	Appearances	Goals	Notes
Cristian Chivu	Romania	Defender	1998–1999	32	3	
Marius Filip	Romania	Defender	1998–1999	4	0	
Ionel Gane	Romania	Striker	1991–1996, 2004, 2006	136	37	
Silvian Cristescu	Romania	Midfielder	1991–1998, 1999–2000	236	35	
Gheorghe Craioveanu	Romania	Striker	1991–1995	129	61	
Corneliu Papură	Romania	Defender	1991–1996, 1999–2001; 2002–2004, 2005	226	13	
Adrian Ungur	Romania	Striker	1994–1998	104	32	
Eugen Trică	Romania	Midfielder	1994–1999, 2010	108	15	
Cornel Frăsineanu	Romania	Defender	1994–2000, 2001–2002	120	10	
Cătălin Crăciunescu	Romania	Defender	1995–1999, 2000; 2001–2003, 2004, 2005–2007	116	0	
Gabriel Popescu	Romania	Midfielder	1995–1998, 2001	101	16	
Marius Sava	Romania	Midfielder	1995–2001, 2002–2003	107	18	
Ionuț Luțu	Romania	Midfielder	1996–1998, 2002–2003; 2004–2005, 2007	143	41	
Mircea Bornescu	Romania	Goalkeeper	2005–2009	123	0	
Josh Mitchell	Australia	Defender	2005–2009	107	3	
Dorel Stoica	Romania	Defender	2005–2010	134	10	
Joshua Rose	Australia	Defender	2006–2009	120	9	
Florin Costea	Romania	Striker	2006–2011	119	47	
