= 1972–73 Divizia C =

Third tier Romanian football league

Divizia C
- Season: 1972–73

The 1972–73 Divizia C was the 17th season of Liga III, the third tier of the Romanian football league system.

== Team changes ==
=== To Divizia C ===
Relegated from Divizia B

- Poiana Câmpina
- Gaz Metan Mediaș
- Portul Constanța
- Vulturii Textila Lugoj

Promoted from County Championship

- Străduința Suceava
- Relonul Săvinești
- Locomotiva Adjud
- Constructorul Gheorghiu-Dej
- Unirea Tricolor Bârlad
- Chimia Brazi
- Știința Constanța
- Comerțul Brăila
- Sportul Ciorogârla
- Chimia Găești
- Recolta Stoicănești
- Textilistul Pitești
- Gorjul Târgu Jiu
- Victoria Craiova
- Unirea Tomnatic
- Constructorul Arad
- CIL Blaj
- Minerul Bihor
- Rapid Jibou
- Minerul Borșa
- Lacul Ursu Sovata
- Mureșul Toplița
- Foresta Susenii Bârgăului
- ICIM Brașov

=== From Divizia C ===
Promoted to Divizia B

- Delta Tulcea
- Gloria Buzău
- Metalul Turnu Severin
- Metrom Brașov

Relegated to County Championship

- Victoria PTTR Botoșani
- Constructorul Iași
- Luceafărul Focșani
- Gloria Tecuci
- Șantierul Naval Constanța
- Dunărea Brăila
- Mașini Unelte București
- Victoria Lehliu
- Aurora Urziceni
- Viitorul Slănic
- Muscelul Câmpulung
- Rapid Piatra Olt
- Progresul Strehaia
- CFR Caransebeș
- Victoria Caransebeș
- Constructorul Hunedoara
- ASA Sibiu
- Gloria Baia Mare
- Măgura Șimleu Silvaniei
- Minerul Rodna
- Progresul Năsăud
- Miercurea Ciuc
- Colorom Codlea

=== Renamed teams ===
Chimia Suceava was renamed as CSM Suceava.

ITA Pașcani was moved from Pașcani to Iași and was renamed as ITA Iași.

Automobilul Focșani was renamed as Unirea Focșani.

Șoimii Buzău merged with Tarom București, moved from Buzău to București and was renamed as Șoimii Tarom București.

SUT Galați was renamed as Constructorul Galați.

Dacia Galați was renamed as Oțelul Galați.

Unirea Tricolor Brăila was renamed as Chimia Brăila.

Metalurgistul Brăila was renamed as Viitorul Brăila.

Comerțul Alexandria was renamed as Automatica Alexandria.

Sporting Roșiori was renamed as CFR Roșiori.

Gorjul Târgu Jiu was renamed as Cimentul Târgu Jiu.

Foresta Susenii Bârgăului was moved from Susenii Bârgăului to Bistrița and was renamed as Foresta Bistrița.

Politehnica Brașov was renamed as CSU Brașov.

Independența Sibiu was moved from Sibiu to Cisnădie and was renamed as Independența Cisnădie.

== League tables ==
=== Seria I ===
Pos	Team	Pld	W	D	L	GF	GA	GD	Pts	Promotion or relegation
1	CSM Suceava (C, P)	26	16	6	4	55	20	+35	38	Promotion to Divizia B
2	Victoria Roman (P)	26	16	3	7	52	24	+28	35	Promotion to Divizia B
3	Danubiana Roman	26	14	3	9	52	31	+21	31	
4	Avântul Frasin	26	13	2	11	34	32	+2	28	
5	Foresta Fălticeni	32	11	6	15	38	37	+1	28	
6	ASA Câmpulung Moldovenesc	26	9	7	10	36	34	+2	25	
7	Minerul Gura Humorului	26	10	5	11	37	41	−4	25	
8	Minobrad Vatra Dornei	26	10	3	13	43	46	−3	23	
9	Unirea Iași	26	8	7	11	34	46	−12	23	
10	Străduința Suceava	26	8	7	11	21	34	−13	23	
11	Cristalul Dorohoi	26	10	3	13	33	55	−22	23	
12	Nicolina Iași	26	9	4	13	34	44	−10	22	
13	ITA Iași	26	8	5	13	21	33	−12	21	Spared from relegation
14	Textila Botoșani	26	7	6	13	35	48	−13	20	Spared from relegation

Source: romaniansoccer.ro
(C) Champions; (P) Promoted

=== Seria II ===
Pos	Team	Pld	W	D	L	GF	GA	GD	Pts	Promotion or relegation
1	Viitorul Vaslui (C, P)	26	15	7	4	54	13	+41	37	Promotion to Divizia B
2	Petrolul Moinești (P)	26	15	7	4	48	16	+32	37	Promotion to Divizia B
3	Textila Buhuși	26	13	3	10	57	39	+18	29	
4	Relonul Săvinești	26	11	6	9	42	32	+10	28	
5	Locomotiva Adjud	26	12	4	10	42	44	−2	28	
6	Constructorul Gheorghiu-Dej	26	9	8	9	41	45	−4	26	
7	Trotușul Gheorghiu-Dej	26	9	7	10	28	26	+2	25	
8	Letea Bacău	26	9	7	10	37	37	0	25	
9	Minerul Comănești	26	8	8	10	35	35	0	24	
10	Rulmentul Bârlad	26	9	6	11	41	47	−6	24	
11	Oituz Târgu Ocna	26	9	5	12	35	41	−6	23	
12	URA Tecuci	26	8	7	11	32	48	−16	23	
13	Cimentul Bicaz	26	8	5	13	40	46	−6	21	Spared from relegation
14	Unirea Tricolor Bârlad	26	5	4	17	26	89	−63	14	Spared from relegation

Source: romaniansoccer.ro
(C) Champions; (P) Promoted

=== Seria III ===
Pos	Team	Pld	W	D	L	GF	GA	GD	Pts	Promotion or relegation
1	Caraimanul Bușteni (C, P)	26	14	7	5	35	23	+12	35	Promotion to Divizia B
2	Metalul Mija (P)	26	14	7	5	38	28	+10	35	Promotion to Divizia B
3	Olimpia Râmnicu Sărat	26	11	9	6	40	33	+7	31	
4	Unirea Focșani	26	11	8	7	40	27	+13	30	
5	Prahova Ploiești	26	10	8	8	42	35	+7	28	
6	Șoimii Tarom București	26	10	6	10	26	23	+3	26	
7	Petrolistul Boldești	26	9	7	10	38	33	+5	25	
8	Carpați Sinaia	26	9	7	10	28	26	+2	25	
9	Victoria Florești	26	11	3	12	35	43	−8	25	
10	Petrolul Berca	26	10	5	11	32	44	−12	25	
11	IRA Câmpina	26	8	8	10	26	27	−1	24	
12	Poiana Câmpina	26	7	9	10	37	26	+11	23	
13	Chimia Brazi	26	7	7	12	29	39	−10	21	Spared from relegation
14	Chimia Buzău	26	4	3	19	19	59	−40	11	Spared from relegation

Source: romaniansoccer.ro
(C) Champions; (P) Promoted

=== Seria IV ===
Pos	Team	Pld	W	D	L	GF	GA	GD	Pts	Promotion or relegation
1	Constructorul Galați (C, P)	26	16	6	4	48	20	+28	38	Promotion to Divizia B
2	Oțelul Galați (P)	26	12	6	8	23	19	+4	30	Promotion to Divizia B
3	Chimia Brăila	26	11	7	8	38	30	+8	29	
4	IMU Medgidia	26	11	7	8	34	33	+1	29	
5	Portul Constanța	26	10	7	9	35	24	+11	27	
6	Marina Mangalia	26	11	5	10	27	24	+3	27	
7	Cimentul Medgidia	26	9	8	9	27	25	+2	26	
8	Viitorul Brăila	26	10	5	11	42	39	+3	25	
9	Electrica Constanța	26	11	3	12	29	27	+2	25	
10	Dunărea Tulcea	26	11	3	12	30	32	−2	25	
11	Granitul Babadag	26	7	11	8	30	44	−14	25	
12	Știința Constanța	26	7	9	10	30	31	−1	23	
13	Ancora Galați	26	8	5	13	23	43	−20	21	Spared from relegation
14	Comerțul Brăila	26	3	8	15	15	40	−25	14	Spared from relegation

Source: romaniansoccer.ro
(C) Champions; (P) Promoted

=== Seria V ===
Pos	Team	Pld	W	D	L	GF	GA	GD	Pts	Promotion or relegation
1	Celuloza Călărași (C, P)	26	17	6	3	49	20	+29	40	Promotion to Divizia B
2	Autobuzul București (P)	26	13	6	7	41	25	+16	32	Promotion to Divizia B
3	TMB București	26	12	7	7	45	35	+10	31	
4	Azotul Slobozia	26	13	3	10	41	39	+2	29	
5	Flacăra Roșie București	26	11	6	9	29	23	+6	28	
6	Electronica Obor București	26	11	5	10	34	22	+12	27	
7	Unirea Tricolor București	26	10	5	11	35	32	+3	25	
8	Olimpia Giurgiu	26	8	9	9	30	31	−1	25	
9	Laromet București	26	9	6	11	25	24	+1	24	
10	Voința București	26	7	10	9	25	27	−2	24	
11	Sirena București	26	9	6	11	31	44	−13	24	
12	Dinamo Obor București	26	6	11	9	28	27	+1	23	
13	Tehnometal București	26	6	9	11	32	44	−12	21	Spared from relegation
14	Sportul Ciorogârla	26	3	5	18	18	70	−52	11	Spared from relegation

Source: romaniansoccer.ro
(C) Champions; (P) Promoted

=== Seria VI ===
Pos	Team	Pld	W	D	L	GF	GA	GD	Pts	Promotion or relegation
1	Flacăra Moreni (C, P)	26	15	6	5	44	19	+25	36	Promotion to Divizia B
2	Oltul Slatina (P)	26	12	10	4	41	25	+16	34	Promotion to Divizia B
3	Dacia Pitești	26	14	3	9	41	24	+17	31	
4	Automatica Alexandria	26	11	7	8	28	22	+6	29	
5	Chimia Turnu Măgurele	26	10	7	9	31	31	0	27	
6	Petrolul Videle	26	8	10	8	26	22	+4	26	
7	Progresul Corabia	26	10	6	10	34	43	−9	26	
8	Petrolul Târgoviște	26	9	7	10	35	42	−7	25	
9	Răsăritul Caracal	26	9	6	11	35	29	+6	24	
10	Chimia Găești	26	9	6	11	33	32	+1	24	
11	Unirea Drăgășani	26	8	7	11	22	27	−5	23	
12	CFR Roșiori	26	7	8	11	26	43	−17	22	
13	Recolta Stoicănești	26	7	5	14	37	60	−23	19	Spared from relegation
14	Textilistul Pitești	26	7	4	15	30	44	−14	18	Spared from relegation

Source: romaniansoccer.ro
(C) Champions; (P) Promoted

=== Seria VII ===
Pos	Team	Pld	W	D	L	GF	GA	GD	Pts	Promotion or relegation
1	Minerul Motru (C, P)	26	16	6	4	66	21	+45	38	Promotion to Divizia B
2	Vulturii Textila Lugoj (P)	26	16	6	4	58	19	+39	38	Promotion to Divizia B
3	Minerul Moldova Nouă	26	13	3	10	46	31	+15	29	
4	Știința Petroșani	26	13	0	13	42	32	+10	26	
5	Metalul Oțelu Roșu	26	10	5	11	41	39	+2	25	
6	Minerul Bocșa Montană	26	11	3	12	39	38	+1	25	
7	Pandurii Târgu Jiu	26	12	1	13	26	40	−14	25	
8	Dunărea Calafat	26	11	2	13	39	38	+1	24	
9	Steagul Roșu Plenița	26	11	2	13	33	45	−12	24	
10	Metalul Topleț	26	11	1	14	39	51	−12	23	
11	Minerul Rovinari	26	9	5	12	29	45	−16	23	
12	Cimentul Târgu Jiu	26	8	7	11	23	49	−26	23	
13	Victoria Craiova	26	8	6	12	29	48	−19	22	Spared from relegation
14	Meva Drobeta-Turnu Severin	26	8	3	15	29	43	−14	19	Spared from relegation

Source: romaniansoccer.ro
(C) Champions; (P) Promoted

=== Seria VIII ===
Pos	Team	Pld	W	D	L	GF	GA	GD	Pts	Promotion or relegation
1	Mureșul Deva (C, P)	26	16	5	5	49	17	+32	37	Promotion to Divizia B
2	UM Timișoara (P)	26	13	5	8	47	23	+24	31	Promotion to Divizia B
3	Electromotor Timișoara	26	12	6	8	47	23	+24	30	
4	Victoria Călan	26	12	5	9	35	32	+3	29	
5	CFR Simeria	26	10	7	9	40	28	+12	27	
6	Vagonul Arad	26	12	3	11	38	30	+8	27	
7	Minerul Lupeni	26	11	4	11	36	36	0	26	
8	Minerul Teliuc	26	10	6	10	28	32	−4	26	
9	Unirea Tomnatic	26	11	3	12	37	48	−11	25	
10	Minerul Ghelar	26	11	2	13	35	39	−4	24	
11	Gloria Arad	26	10	4	12	37	50	−13	24	
12	Furnirul Deta	26	9	5	12	27	43	−16	23	
13	Progresul Timișoara	26	8	6	12	36	42	−6	22	Spared from relegation
14	Constructorul Arad	26	5	3	18	27	76	−49	13	Spared from relegation

Source: romaniansoccer.ro
(C) Champions; (P) Promoted

=== Seria IX ===
Pos	Team	Pld	W	D	L	GF	GA	GD	Pts	Promotion or relegation
1	Arieșul Turda (C, P)	26	17	4	5	53	26	+27	34 (Note: Arieșul Turda was penalized with 4 points.)	Promotion to Divizia B
2	IS Câmpia Turzii (P)	26	15	5	6	50	23	+27	31 (Note: IS Câmpia Turzii was penalized with 4 points.)	Promotion to Divizia B
3	Unirea Dej	26	14	7	5	40	21	+19	31 (Note: Unirea Dej was penalized with 4 points.)	
4	CIL Blaj	26	13	2	11	31	30	+1	28	
5	Aurul Brad	26	12	3	11	32	31	+1	27	
6	Minaur Zlatna	26	10	6	10	30	27	+3	26	
7	Metalul Aiud	26	11	4	11	31	36	−5	26	
8	Unirea Alba Iulia	26	10	5	11	28	31	−3	25	
9	Minerul Bihor	26	11	1	14	31	44	−13	23	
10	Soda Ocna Mureș	26	9	5	12	29	46	−17	23	
11	CIL Gherla	26	9	4	13	31	31	0	22	
12	Dermata Cluj-Napoca	26	7	7	12	22	33	−11	21	
13	Arieșul Câmpia Turzii	26	8	3	15	23	31	−8	19	Spared from relegation
14	Tehnofrig Cluj-Napoca	26	5	6	15	14	35	−21	16	Spared from relegation

Source: romaniansoccer.ro
(C) Champions; (P) Promoted

=== Seria X ===
Pos	Team	Pld	W	D	L	GF	GA	GD	Pts	Promotion or relegation
1	Victoria Carei (C, P)	26	18	2	6	86	20	+66	38	Promotion to Divizia B
2	Minerul Cavnic (P)	26	16	3	7	37	27	+10	35	Promotion to Divizia B
3	Bihoreana Marghita	26	14	1	11	51	40	+11	29	
4	Topitorul Baia Mare	26	11	5	10	44	31	+13	27	
5	Minerul Baia Sprie	26	12	3	11	39	33	+6	27	
6	Voința Carei	26	13	1	12	34	52	−18	27	
7	Bradul Vișeu de Sus	26	10	5	11	22	31	−9	25	
8	Rapid Jibou	26	10	5	11	34	48	−14	25	
9	Minerul Borșa	26	11	2	13	32	35	−3	24	
10	CIL Sighetu Marmației	26	11	2	13	34	38	−4	24	
11	Unirea Zalău	26	10	4	12	26	35	−9	24	
12	Recolta Salonta	26	11	2	13	25	36	−11	24	
13	Someșul Satu Mare	26	8	4	14	29	37	−8	20	Spared from relegation
14	Constructorul Baia Mare	26	7	1	18	25	55	−30	15	Spared from relegation

Source: romaniansoccer.ro
(C) Champions; (P) Promoted

=== Seria XI ===
Pos	Team	Pld	W	D	L	GF	GA	GD	Pts	Promotion or relegation
1	Gaz Metan Mediaș (C, P)	26	17	6	3	77	16	+61	40	Promotion to Divizia B
2	Textila Odorheiu Secuiesc (P)	26	17	4	5	59	28	+31	38	Promotion to Divizia B
3	Viitorul Târgu Mureș	26	13	5	8	40	37	+3	31	
4	Lacul Ursu Sovata	26	11	6	9	45	41	+4	28	
5	Viitorul Gheorgheni	26	12	3	11	32	39	−7	27	
6	Minerul Bălan	26	10	6	10	34	29	+5	26	
7	Oltul Sfântu Gheorghe	26	11	3	12	65	37	+28	25	
8	Vitrometan Mediaș	26	13	3	10	35	29	+6	25 (Note: Vitrometan Mediaș was penalized with 4 points.)	
9	Unirea Cristuru Secuiesc	26	8	8	10	40	37	+3	24	
10	Forestierul Târgu Secuiesc	26	9	5	12	36	37	−1	23	
11	Mureșul Toplița	26	8	5	13	35	51	−16	21	
12	Carpați Covasna	26	7	6	13	35	47	−12	20	
13	Someșul Beclean	26	8	3	15	24	78	−54	19	Spared from relegation
14	Foresta Bistrița	26	5	3	18	26	77	−51	13	Spared from relegation

Source: romaniansoccer.ro
(C) Champions; (P) Promoted

=== Seria XII ===
Pos	Team	Pld	W	D	L	GF	GA	GD	Pts	Promotion or relegation
1	Tractorul Brașov (C, P)	26	15	6	5	54	23	+31	36	Promotion to Divizia B
2	Carpați Brașov (P)	26	14	3	9	38	14	+24	31	Promotion to Divizia B
3	ICIM Brașov	26	12	6	8	39	19	+20	30	
4	Metalul Copșa Mică	26	13	3	10	36	23	+13	29	
5	Independența Cisnădie	26	12	2	12	37	34	+3	26	
6	CFR Sighișoara	26	10	6	10	26	39	−13	26	
7	Chimia Orașul Victoria	26	11	3	12	43	42	+1	25	
8	CSU Brașov	26	9	7	10	33	32	+1	25	
9	Lotru Brezoi	26	10	5	11	28	45	−17	25	
10	Oltul Râmnicu Vâlcea	26	8	8	10	37	43	−6	24	
11	UPA Sibiu	26	7	10	9	29	39	−10	24	
12	Chimica Târnăveni	26	9	6	11	29	44	−15	24	
13	Torpedo Zărnești	26	9	4	13	36	31	+5	22	Spared from relegation
14	Textila Sebeș	26	8	1	17	24	56	−32	13 (Note: Textila Sebeș was penalized with 4 points.)	Spared from relegation

Source: romaniansoccer.ro
(C) Champions; (P) Promoted

== See also ==
- 1972–73 Divizia A
- 1972–73 Divizia B
- 1972–73 County Championship
- 1972–73 Cupa României
