= 1973–74 Divizia B =

Divizia B
- Season: 1973–74
- Promoted: FC Galați; Chimia Râmnicu Vâlcea; Olimpia Satu Mare
- Relegated: Viitorul Vaslui; Minerul Motru; Olimpia Oradea; Caraimanul Bușteni; Carpați Brașov; Minerul Cavnic; Petrolul Moinești; Nitramonia Făgăraș; Textila Odorheiu Secuiesc; Victoria Roman; Dunărea Giurgiu; Gloria Bistrița

The 1973–74 Divizia B was the 34th season of the second tier of the Romanian football league system.

The format has been changed to three series, each of them having 18 teams. At the end of the season the winners of the series promoted to Divizia A and the last four places from each series relegated to Divizia C.

== Team changes ==
=== To Divizia B ===
Promoted from Divizia C

- CSM Suceava
- Viitorul Vaslui
- Caraimanul Bușteni
- Constructorul Galați
- Celuloza Călărași
- Flacăra Moreni
- Minerul Motru
- Mureșul Deva
- Arieșul Turda
- Victoria Carei
- Gaz Metan Mediaș
- Tractorul Brașov
- Victoria Roman
- Petrolul Moinești
- Metalul Mija
- Oțelul Galați
- Autobuzul București
- Oltul Slatina
- Vulturii Textila Lugoj
- UM Timișoara
- IS Câmpia Turzii
- Minerul Cavnic
- Textila Odorheiu Secuiesc
- Carpați Brașov

Relegated from Divizia A

- —

=== From Divizia B ===
Relegated to Divizia C

- —

Promoted to Divizia A

- Politehnica Iași
- Politehnica Timișoara

=== Renamed teams ===
Delta Tulcea was renamed as SC Tulcea.

Oltul Slatina was renamed as Dinamo Slatina.

=== Other teams ===
CSM Sibiu and Șoimii Sibiu merged, the first one being absorbed by the second one.

CFR Arad and Vagonul Arad merged, the new entity was named Unirea Arad.

== League tables ==
=== Serie I ===
Pos	Team	Pld	W	D	L	GF	GA	GD	Pts	Promotion or relegation
1	FC Galați (C, P)	34	19	8	7	41	22	+19	46	Promotion to Divizia A
2	Gloria Buzău	34	16	10	8	55	25	+30	42	
3	Știința Bacău	34	17	7	10	44	33	+11	41	
4	Metalul Plopeni	34	16	7	11	52	38	+14	39	
5	CSM Suceava	34	17	3	14	50	41	+9	37	
6	Ceahlăul Piatra Neamț	34	15	6	13	55	35	+20	36	
7	Oțelul Galați	34	15	3	16	41	49	−8	33	
8	Progresul Brăila	34	12	8	14	38	34	+4	32	
9	CFR Pașcani	34	10	12	12	38	38	0	32	
10	Tulcea	34	12	8	14	33	34	−1	32	
11	CSU Galați	34	14	4	16	50	54	−4	32	
12	Celuloza Călărași	34	14	4	16	41	52	−11	32	
13	Metalul Mija	34	13	6	15	37	48	−11	32	
14	Constructorul Galați	34	12	7	15	39	49	−10	31	
15	Viitorul Vaslui (R)	34	10	11	13	33	45	−12	31	Relegation to Divizia C
16	Caraimanul Bușteni (R)	34	12	6	16	36	50	−14	30	Relegation to Divizia C
17	Petrolul Moinești (R)	34	8	12	14	37	56	−19	28	Relegation to Divizia C
18	Victoria Roman (R)	34	10	6	18	30	47	−17	26	Relegation to Divizia C

Source: romaniansoccer.ro
Rules for classification: 1) Points; 2) Goal difference; 3) Goals scored; 4) Head-to-head points; 5) Head-to-head goal difference; 6) Head-to-head goals scored; 7) Head-to-head away goals scored.
(C) Champions; (P) Promoted; (R) Relegated

=== Serie II ===
Pos	Team	Pld	W	D	L	GF	GA	GD	Pts	Promotion or relegation
1	Chimia Râmnicu Vâlcea (C, P)	34	22	4	8	46	24	+22	48	Promotion to Divizia A
2	Șoimii Sibiu	34	19	8	7	49	27	+22	46	
3	Dinamo Slatina	34	16	8	10	48	36	+12	40	
4	Flacăra Moreni	34	16	6	12	46	35	+11	38	
5	Metalul Turnu Severin	34	17	3	14	35	43	−8	37	
6	Metalul București	34	15	5	14	33	30	+3	35	
7	Progresul București	34	14	7	13	33	39	−6	35	
8	Electroputere Craiova	34	15	4	15	59	43	+16	34	
9	Tractorul Brașov	34	13	8	13	33	36	−3	34	
10	Metrom Brașov	34	13	6	15	42	38	+4	32	
11	Autobuzul București	34	13	6	15	38	45	−7	32	
12	CS Târgoviște	34	13	5	16	40	42	−2	31	
13	SN Oltenița	34	11	9	14	35	39	−4	31	
14	Gaz Metan Mediaș	34	10	10	14	39	34	+5	30	
15	Minerul Motru (R)	34	13	4	17	31	38	−7	30	Relegation to Divizia C
16	Carpați Brașov (R)	34	12	5	17	30	48	−18	29	Relegation to Divizia C
17	Nitramonia Făgăraș (R)	34	9	9	16	41	52	−11	27	Relegation to Divizia C
18	Dunărea Giurgiu (R)	34	7	9	18	20	49	−29	23	Relegation to Divizia C

Source: romaniansoccer.ro
Rules for classification: 1) Points; 2) Goal difference; 3) Goals scored; 4) Head-to-head points; 5) Head-to-head goal difference; 6) Head-to-head goals scored; 7) Head-to-head away goals scored.
(C) Champions; (P) Promoted; (R) Relegated

=== Serie III ===
Pos	Team	Pld	W	D	L	GF	GA	GD	Pts	Promotion or relegation
1	Olimpia Satu Mare (C, P)	34	19	9	6	46	17	+29	47	Promotion to Divizia A
2	Bihor Oradea	34	17	4	13	39	25	+14	38	
3	UM Timișoara	34	17	4	13	46	38	+8	38	
4	Mureșul Deva	34	15	6	13	35	33	+2	36	
5	Minerul Baia Mare	34	14	7	13	45	36	+9	35	
6	Corvinul Hunedoara	34	13	8	13	32	34	−2	34	
7	Victoria Carei	34	15	4	15	49	53	−4	34	
8	Vulturii Textila Lugoj	34	14	5	15	41	42	−1	33	
9	IS Câmpia Turzii	34	14	5	15	42	45	−3	33	
10	Unirea Arad	34	11	11	12	38	44	−6	33	
11	Minerul Anina	34	14	5	15	46	53	−7	33	
12	Metalurgistul Cugir	34	12	8	14	40	40	0	32	
13	CFR Timișoara	34	13	6	15	41	44	−3	32	
14	Arieșul Turda	34	13	6	15	41	44	−3	32	
15	Olimpia Oradea (R)	34	13	6	15	32	36	−4	32	Relegation to Divizia C
16	Minerul Cavnic (R)	34	14	3	17	39	50	−11	31	Relegation to Divizia C
17	Textila Odorheiu Secuiesc (R)	34	11	8	15	38	48	−10	30	Relegation to Divizia C
18	Gloria Bistrița (R)	34	13	3	18	40	48	−8	29	Relegation to Divizia C

Source: romaniansoccer.ro
Rules for classification: 1) Points; 2) Goal difference; 3) Goals scored; 4) Head-to-head points; 5) Head-to-head goal difference; 6) Head-to-head goals scored; 7) Head-to-head away goals scored.
(C) Champions; (P) Promoted; (R) Relegated

== See also ==
- 1973–74 Divizia A
- 1973–74 Divizia C
- 1973–74 County Championship
- 1973–74 Cupa României
