= Stadionul Minerul =

There are several stadiums in Romania with the name Stadionul Minerul:

- Stadionul Minerul (Lupeni)
- Stadionul Minerul (Moldova Noua)
- Stadionul Minerul (Motru)
- Stadionul Minerul (Valea Copcii)
