= CS Știința Bacău (1965) =

Știința Bacău
- Full name: Clubul Sportiv Știința Bacău
- Nicknames: Studenții (The students)
- Short name: Știința Bacău
- Founded: 1965
- Dissolved: 1975

Știința Bacău was a Romanian football team located in Bacău, founded in 1965 and dissolved in 1975. The team represented the football section of the multi-sport club CS Știința Bacău, which also include athletics, women's handball, men's handball, women's and men's volleyball sections.

In the ten years the team was active they rose from the city championship to second division.

== History ==
The Bacău Pedagogical Institute football team was founded in August 1965 by the young coach Corneliu Costinescu.

Starting from the city championship, the representative of Bacău students occupied the 1st place at the end of the 1965–66 season, advancing in Bacău Regional Championship.

The students repeat the performance of the first year, taking the 1st place in the 1966–67 season of the Bacău Regional Championship and qualify to promotion play-off in third division, losing to SUT Galați (1–2 at Galați and 1–1 at Bacău).

Știința won the second season in the Regional Championship finishing 1st and managed to promoted directly, as the promotion play-off was not held, due to the expansion of Divizia C.

In the 1968–69 season, Știința won the Series I of Divizia C, two points ahead of runners-up Foresta Fălticeni and finish 2nd in the promotion play-off, held at București, promoting to second division. The team that take part in the play-off matches included: Enăchiuc, Tacalete - goalkeepers, Boiangiu, Constantin, Cornel Ciocoiu, Corobană, Tascu - defenders, Rotaru, Lucrețiu Avram, Ilarion, Mărgășoiu - midfielders, Mihalache, Pelea, Buterez, Sdrobiș, Popescu, Popovici, Bălan - forwards.

In 1975, Știința Bacău and CAROM Onești merged, the first one being absorbed by the second one. After the merge, CAROM was moved to Borzești, a village (now part of Onești) and renamed as CSM Borzești.

== Honours ==
Divizia B

- Best finish 3rd: 1973–74

Divizia C

- Winners (1): 1968–69

Bacău Regional Championship

- Winners (2): 1966–67, 1967–68
