= Albert Voinea =

Romanian footballer

Personal information
- Full name: Albert Nicolae Voinea
- Date of birth: 6 December 1992 (age 33)
- Place of birth: Urdari, Romania
- Height: 1.85 m (6 ft 1 in)
- Position: Forward

Team information
- Current team: Unirea Alba Iulia
- Number: 9

Youth career
- –2009: Pandurii Târgu Jiu

Senior career*
| Years | Team | Apps | (Gls) |
| 2010–2015 | Pandurii Târgu Jiu | 2 | (0) |
| 2011–2012 | → Gloria Bistrița (loan) | 12 | (4) |
| 2012–2013 | → Sportul Snagov (loan) | 19 | (12) |
| 2013–2014 | → Universitatea Craiova (loan) | 8 | (1) |
| 2014 | → Sportul Snagov (loan) | 9 | (0) |
| 2015 | Șoimii Pâncota | 3 | (0) |
| 2015–2016 | Râmnicu Vâlcea | 22 | (5) |
| 2016 | Unirea Tărlungeni | 10 | (0) |
| 2018 | Viitorul Târgu Jiu | 3 | (2) |
| 2018 | CSM Deva | 13 | (4) |
| 2019 | Dumbrăvița | 14 | (14) |
| 2019 | Ripensia Timișoara | 21 | (13) |
| 2020 | Turris Turnu Măgurele | 19 | (6) |
| 2021 | UTA Arad | 7 | (0) |
| 2021 | Universitatea Cluj | 6 | (1) |
| 2022 | Mioveni | 6 | (1) |
| 2022–2023 | Concordia Chajna | 8 | (1) |
| 2023 | Metaloglobus București | 1 | (0) |
| 2023–2024 | Viitorul Târgu Jiu | 13 | (1) |
| 2024– | Unirea Alba Iulia | 0 | (0) |
- * Club domestic league appearances and goals as of 08:41, 8 November 2024 (UTC)

Albert Nicolae Voinea (born 6 December 1992) is a Romanian footballer who plays as a forward for Liga III club Unirea Alba Iulia.

== Honours ==
Universitatea Craiova

- Liga II: 2013–14

ACS Șirineasa

- Liga III: 2017–18
