= 1965–66 Divizia B =

Divizia B
- Season: 1965–66
- Promoted: Progresul București; Jiul Petrila
- Relegated: CFR Roșiori; Recolta Carei; Metalul Trgoviște; Arieșul Turda

The 1965–66 Divizia B was the 26th season of the second tier of the Romanian football league system.

The format has been maintained to two series, each of them having 14 teams. At the end of the season the winners of the series promoted to Divizia A and the last two places from each series relegated to Divizia C.

== Team changes ==
=== To Divizia B ===
Promoted from Divizia C

- Ceahlăul Piatra Neamț
- Dinamo Victoria București
- CFR Arad
- Arieșul Turda

Relegated from Divizia A

- Minerul Baia Mare
- Progresul București

=== From Divizia B ===
Relegated to Divizia C

- Tractorul Brașov
- Sătmăreana Satu Mare
- Chimia Făgăraș
- CFR Timișoara

Promoted to Divizia A

- Siderurgistul Galați
- Știința Timișoara

=== Renamed teams ===
Constructorul Brăila was renamed as Progresul Brăila.

Metalul București was renamed as Metalurgistul București.

Unirea Râmnicu Vâlcea was renamed as Oltul Râmnicu Vâlcea.

=== Other teams ===
Știința Galați gave away its place in the Divizia B to newly founded Oțelul Galați.

== League tables ==
=== Serie I ===
Pos	Team	Pld	W	D	L	GF	GA	GD	Pts	Promotion or relegation
1	Progresul București (C, P)	26	14	7	5	49	24	+25	35	Promotion to Divizia A
2	Știința București	26	14	6	6	47	22	+25	34	
3	Metalurgistul București	26	12	5	9	48	40	+8	29	
4	Flacăra Moreni	26	14	1	11	40	37	+3	29	
5	Dinamo Bacău	26	10	7	9	37	27	+10	27	
6	Progresul Brăila	26	12	2	12	32	45	−13	26	
7	Ceahlăul Piatra Neamț	26	10	4	12	44	39	+5	24	
8	Dinamo Victoria București	26	10	4	12	38	40	−2	24	
9	Poiana Câmpina	26	9	6	11	30	33	−3	24	
10	Oltul Râmnicu Vâlcea	26	9	6	11	34	40	−6	24	
11	CFR Pașcani	26	10	4	12	37	44	−7	24	
12	Oțelul Galați	26	9	5	12	27	33	−6	23	
13	CFR Roșiori (R)	26	9	4	13	28	40	−12	22	Relegation to Divizia C
14	Metalul Târgoviște (R)	26	8	3	15	24	51	−27	19	Relegation to Divizia C

Source: romaniansoccer.ro
Rules for classification: 1) Points 2) Head-to-head points; 3) Head-to-head goal difference; 4) Head-to-head goals scored; 5) Head-to-head away goals scored; 6) Goal difference; 7) Goals scored.
(C) Champions; (P) Promoted; (R) Relegated

=== Serie II ===
Pos	Team	Pld	W	D	L	GF	GA	GD	Pts	Promotion or relegation
1	Jiul Petrila (C, P)	26	17	5	4	47	21	+26	39	Promotion to Divizia A
2	Minerul Baia Mare	26	14	7	5	43	20	+23	35	
3	Vagonul Arad	26	15	4	7	45	29	+16	34	
4	ASA Mureșul Târgu Mureș	26	13	6	7	33	16	+17	32	
5	CSM Reșița	26	13	2	11	34	41	−7	28	
6	Cugir	26	11	4	11	34	29	+5	26	
7	IS Câmpia Turzii	26	10	4	12	34	38	−4	24	
8	Gaz Metan Mediaș	26	9	4	13	25	31	−6	22	
9	Clujeana Cluj	26	7	8	11	31	43	−12	22	
10	CFR Arad	26	8	6	12	21	46	−25	22	
11	Minerul Lupeni	26	9	3	14	27	25	+2	21	
12	CSM Sibiu	26	9	3	14	31	36	−5	21	
13	Recolta Carei (R)	26	8	5	13	28	38	−10	21	Relegation to Divizia C
14	Arieșul Turda (R)	26	7	3	16	19	39	−20	17	Relegation to Divizia C

Source: romaniansoccer.ro
Rules for classification: 1) Points 2) Head-to-head points; 3) Head-to-head goal difference; 4) Head-to-head goals scored; 5) Head-to-head away goals scored; 6) Goal difference; 7) Goals scored.
(C) Champions; (P) Promoted; (R) Relegated

== See also ==
- 1965–66 Divizia A
- 1965–66 Divizia C
- 1965–66 Regional Championship
- 1965–66 Cupa României
