= Aurel Amzucu =

Romanian professional footballer

Personal information
- Date of birth: 6 May 1974 (age 52)
- Place of birth: Urdari, Romania
- Height: 1.84 m (6 ft 0 in)
- Position: Defender

Youth career
- Minerul Urdari

Senior career*
Years	Team	Apps	(Gls)
1995–1997	Minerul Urdari		
1997–1998	Petrolul Țicleni		
1998–2000	Minerul Motru	45	(4)
2000–2003	Pandurii Târgu Jiu	66	(1)
2003–2004	FC Oradea	17	(0)
2004–2005	Minerul Motru	32	(1)
2005–2006	Pandurii Târgu Jiu	9	(0)
2006–2007	FCM Reșița	27	(3)
2007–2009	Drobeta-Turnu Severin	24	(0)
2009–2010	Ralbex Turcinești		
2010–2011	Jiul Rovinari		
2012–2019	Petrolul Țicleni	39	(3)
2019	Gilortul Târgu Cărbunești		
2020	Avântul Baia de Fier	1	(1)
Total		260+	(13+)
- * Club domestic league appearances and goals as of 11:55, 23 June 2021 (UTC)

Aurel Amzucu (born 6 May 1974) is a Romanian former professional footballer who played as a defender for teams such as Petrolul Țicleni, Minerul Motru, Pandurii Târgu Jiu, FC Oradea or FCM Reșița, among others.

== Honours ==
Pandurii Târgu Jiu

- Divizia C: Winner 1999–2000
