= Urdari =

- Commune
- Location in Romania
- Coordinates: 44°48′N 23°17′E
- Country: Romania
- County: Gorj
- Subdivisions: Fântânele, Hotăroasa, Urdari

Government
  - Mayor (2020–2024): Mihai Calotă (PSD)
- Area: 34.27 km^{2} (13.23 sq mi)
- Elevation: 146 m (479 ft)
- Population (2021-12-01): 2,756
  - Density: 80.42/km^{2} (208.3/sq mi)
- Time zone: UTC+02:00 (EET)
  - Summer (DST): UTC+03:00 (EEST)
- Postal code: 217540
- Area code: +40 x53
- Vehicle reg.: GJ
- Website: primariaurdari.ro

Urdari is a commune in Gorj County, Oltenia, Romania. It is composed of three villages: Fântânele, Hotăroasa, and Urdari.

== Natives ==
- Aurel Amzucu (born 1974), footballer
- Albert Voinea (born 1992), footballer
