= 1966–67 Regional Championship =

25th season of the Liga IV, the fourth tier of the Romanian football league

Liga IV
- Season: 1966–67

The 1966–67 Regional Championship was the 25th season of the Liga IV, the fourth tier of the Romanian football league system. The champions of Regional Championships play against each other in the playoffs to earn promotion to Divizia C.

== Regional championships ==
- Argeș (AG)
- Bacău (BC)
- Banat (BA)
- Brașov (BV)
- Bucharest Municipality (B)
- Bucharest Region (B)
- Cluj (CJ)
- Crișana (CR)
- Dobrogea (DO)
- Galați (GL)
- Hunedoara (HD)
- Iași (IS)
- Maramureș (MM)
- Mureș (MS)
- Oltenia (OL)
- Ploiești (PL)
- Suceava (SV)

== Promotion play-off ==
Preliminary round

The matches were played on 25 June, 2 and 5 July 1967.

Team 1	Series	Team 2	Game 1	Game 2	Game 3
Politehnica Brașov (BV)	1–1 (Note: Minerul Motru advanced to the next round due to the younger average age.)	(OT) Minerul Motru	0–0	0–0	1–1 (Note: The match was played on neutral ground at Râmnicu Vâlcea.)

Play-off round

The matches were played on 9 and 16 July and 4 August 1967.

Team 1	Series	Team 2	Game 1	Game 2	Game 3
Medicina Iași (IS)	6–1	(SV) Minerul Fundu Moldovei	4–0	2–1	
SUT Galați (GL)	3–2	(BC) Știința IP Bacău	2–1	1–1	
TUG București (B)	4–3	(DO) Cimentul Medgidia	2–1	2–2	
Chimia Turnu Măgurele (B)	5–3	(AG) Metalul Pitești	2–1	1–2	2–0
Voința Oradea (CR)	0–4	(MM) Unio Satu Mare	0–1	0–3	
Gloria Bistrița (CJ)	2–3	(MS) Știința Târgu Mureș	2–1	0–2	
Aurul Brad (HD)	1–2	(BA) UM Timișoara	1–0	0–2	
Minerul Motru (OT)	1–2	(PL) Victoria Boboc	1–0	0–1	0–1 (Note: The match was played on neutral ground at Pitești.)

== Championships standings ==
=== Argeș Region ===
North Series

Pos	Team	Pld	W	D	L	GF	GA	GD	Pts	Qualification or relegation
1	Metalul Pitești (Q)	22	15	3	4	62	20	+42	33	Qualification to championship final
2	Foresta Curtea de Argeș	22	13	6	3	42	20	+22	32	
3	Forestierul Stâlpeni	22	14	3	5	46	26	+20	31	
4	Chimia Govora	22	10	7	5	43	31	+12	27	
5	Electrica Pitești	22	8	9	5	26	23	+3	25	
6	Lotru Brezoi	22	8	8	6	37	24	+13	24	
7	Unirea Horezu	22	11	1	10	30	37	−7	23	
8	Minerul Câmpulung	22	8	6	8	28	28	0	22	
9	ASA Pitești	22	8	4	10	32	33	−1	20	
10	Automobilul Câmpulung	22	5	6	11	20	29	−9	16	
11	Sănătatea Govora	22	2	2	18	25	65	−40	6	
12	Vâlceana Râmnicu Vâlcea	22	1	1	20	7	62	−55	3	

Rules for classification: 1) points; 2) goal difference; 3) number of goals scored.
(Q) Qualified for the phase indicated

South Series

Pos	Team	Pld	W	D	L	GF	GA	GD	Pts	Qualification or relegation
1	Unirea Drăgășani (Q)	22	14	4	4	44	16	+28	32	Qualification to championship final
2	Rapid Piatra-Olt	22	12	7	3	29	21	+8	31	
3	Recolta Stoicănești	22	12	4	6	51	25	+26	28	
4	Aluminiu Slatina	22	12	4	6	42	17	+25	28	
5	Voința Balta Sărată	22	10	3	9	38	32	+6	23	
6	Progresul Băiculești	22	10	3	9	35	33	+2	23	
7	Automobilul Găești	22	9	3	10	32	39	−7	21	
8	Oltul Drăgănești-Olt	22	9	2	11	39	43	−4	20	
9	Textilistul Pitești	22	7	4	11	29	31	−2	18	
10	Tractorul Drăgășani	22	8	2	12	25	33	−8	18	
11	Unirea Costești	22	5	2	15	15	57	−42	12	
12	Recolta Dobrogostea	22	4	0	18	18	50	−32	8	

Rules for classification: 1) points; 2) goal difference; 3) number of goals scored.
(Q) Qualified for the phase indicated

Championship final

Team 1	Agg.	Team 2	1st leg	2nd leg
Unirea Drăgășani	2–7	Metalul Pitești	1–4	1–3

Metalul Pitești won the Argeș Regional Championship and qualify to promotion play-off in Divizia C.

=== Bacău Region ===
Pos	Team	Pld	W	D	L	GF	GA	GD	Pts	Qualification or relegation
1	Chimia Gheorghe Gheorghiu-Dej (Note: Chimia Gheorghe Gheorghiu-Dej and Viitorul Săvinești were both expelled, after the match from the last round between the two teams, Chimia − Viitorul 16−0, was considered fixed.) (D)	24	16	4	4	55	20	+35	36	Excluded
2	Știința IP Bacău (C, Q)	24	14	8	2	48	14	+34	36	Qualification to promotion play-off
3	Victoria Bacău	24	10	9	5	30	17	+13	29	
4	Steaua Roșie Bacău	24	11	3	10	45	36	+9	25	
5	Petrolistul Dărmănești	24	13	1	10	44	40	+4	27	
6	Unirea Roman	24	11	3	10	35	42	−7	25	
7	Gloria Zemeș	24	11	2	11	35	34	+1	24	
8	Viitorul Comănești	24	9	5	10	36	40	−4	23	
9	Progresul Gheorghe Gheorghiu-Dej	24	9	2	13	24	40	−16	20	
10	Viitorul Săvinești (D)	24	7	4	13	27	54	−27	18	Excluded
11	Bradul Roznov	24	7	3	14	29	37	−8	17	
12	Cimentul Bicaz	24	7	2	15	24	37	−13	16	
13	Celuloza Piatra Neamț	24	4	8	12	17	38	−21	16	
14	Unirea Bacău (Note: Unirea Bacău was excluded after 9 rounds for two no-show-up and all its results were canceled.) (D)	0	0	0	0	0	0	0	0	Excluded

Rules for classification: 1) points; 2) goal difference; 3) number of goals scored.
(C) Champions; (D) Disqualified; (Q) Qualified for the phase indicated

=== Banat Region ===
North Series

Pos	Team	Pld	W	D	L	GF	GA	GD	Pts	Qualification or relegation
1	UM Timișoara (Q)	26	20	3	3	63	12	+51	43	Qualification to championship final
2	Teba Arad	26	16	5	5	43	23	+20	37	
3	Electromotor Timișoara	26	11	9	6	35	29	+6	31	
4	Șoimii Timișoara	26	12	6	8	39	23	+16	30	
5	Furnirul Deta	26	13	2	11	47	33	+14	28	
6	ICA Arad	26	12	3	11	45	35	+10	27	
7	Progresul Pecica	26	10	7	9	35	30	+5	27	
8	Ceramica Jimbolia	26	10	4	12	30	30	0	24	
9	Luptătorul Lipova	26	8	6	12	34	40	−6	22	
10	Victoria Caransebeș	26	9	4	13	33	55	−22	22	
11	Progresul Ciacova	26	8	4	14	26	43	−17	20	
12	Voința Lugoj	26	8	4	14	29	55	−26	20	
13	Chimia Margina	26	7	2	17	36	70	−34	16	
14	Tractorul Sânnicolau Mare	26	5	5	16	39	56	−17	15	

Rules for classification: 1) points; 2) goal difference; 3) number of goals scored.
(Q) Qualified for the phase indicated

South Series

Pos	Team	Pld	W	D	L	GF	GA	GD	Pts	Qualification or relegation
1	Dinamo Timișoara (Q)	26	17	6	3	66	17	+49	40	Qualification to championship final
2	Progresul Timișoara	26	17	4	5	53	35	+18	38	
3	Metalul Bocșa	26	11	6	9	42	28	+14	28	
4	Minerul Moldova Nouă	26	12	3	11	45	41	+4	27	
5	Minerul Oravița	26	10	6	10	47	33	+14	26	
6	Metalul Topleț	26	11	4	11	41	43	−2	26	
7	Metalul Oțelu Roșu	26	9	7	10	34	30	+4	25	
8	Minerul Bocșa	26	9	7	10	39	33	+6	25	
9	Nera Bozovici	26	11	2	13	50	56	−6	24	
10	Foresta Zăvoi	26	9	6	11	31	50	−19	24	
11	Recolta Jimbolia	26	8	7	11	37	46	−9	23	
12	Laminorul Nădrag	26	9	4	13	28	50	−22	22	
13	Muncitorul Reșița	26	6	8	12	31	42	−11	20	
14	Victoria Deta	26	6	4	16	27	67	−40	16	

Rules for classification: 1) points; 2) goal difference; 3) number of goals scored.
(Q) Qualified for the phase indicated

Championship final

Team 1	Agg.	Team 2	1st leg	2nd leg
UM Timișoara	2–0	Dinamo Timișoara	1–0	1–0

UM Timișoara won the Banat Regional Championship and qualify to promotion play-off in Divizia C.

=== Brașov Region ===
Series I

Pos	Team	Pld	W	D	L	GF	GA	GD	Pts	Qualification or relegation
1	Politehnica Brașov (Q)	22	13	6	3	34	11	+23	32	Qualification to championship final
2	Măgura Codlea	22	10	6	6	28	19	+9	26	
3	Carpați Covasna	22	8	9	5	29	19	+10	25	
4	Celuloza Zărnești	22	10	5	7	24	23	+1	25	
5	Colorom Codlea	22	9	6	7	33	24	+9	24	
6	Carpați Brașov	22	8	6	8	22	16	+6	22	
7	Hidromecanica Brașov	22	6	10	6	17	17	0	22	
8	Textila Prejmer	22	7	6	9	23	25	−2	20	
9	Precizia Săcele	22	7	5	10	19	33	−14	19	
10	Forestierul Târgu Secuiesc	22	6	6	10	26	37	−11	18	
11	Torpedo Zărnești	22	6	4	12	25	29	−4	16	
12	Rulmentul Brașov	22	6	3	13	22	49	−27	15	

Rules for classification: 1) Points; 2) Goal difference; 3) Number of goals scored.
(Q) Qualified for the phase indicated

Series II

Pos	Team	Pld	W	D	L	GF	GA	GD	Pts	Qualification or relegation
1	Textila Cisnădie (Q)	22	10	8	4	34	23	+11	28	Qualification to championship final
2	Textila Mediaș	22	9	7	6	29	30	−1	25	
3	Flamura Roșie Sibiu	22	11	3	8	26	32	−6	25	
4	Chimia Victoria	22	9	5	8	30	23	+7	23	
5	Sparta Mediaș	22	9	4	9	39	24	+15	22	
6	Elastic Sibiu	22	7	8	7	36	28	+8	22	
7	Unirea Tălmaciu	22	9	4	9	30	30	0	22	
8	Progresul Sibiu	22	8	6	8	30	33	−3	22	
9	Carbosin Copșa Mică	22	7	6	9	27	28	−1	20	
10	Vitrometan Mediaș	22	7	6	9	27	32	−5	20	
11	Record Mediaș	22	6	8	8	18	28	−10	20	
12	CIL Blaj	22	6	3	13	35	50	−15	15	

Rules for classification: 1) Points; 2) Goal difference; 3) Number of goals scored.
(Q) Qualified for the phase indicated

Championship final

The matches were played on 28 May and 4 June 1967.

Team 1	Agg.	Team 2	1st leg	2nd leg
Textila Cisnădie	3–3	Politehnica Brașov	3–0	0–3 (Note: The match was stopped in the 70th minute, at 3–0, after the referee awarded a penalty kick to the home team and the away team's players protested by shoving the referee. The regional commission set that the champion team should be Politehnica Brașov.)

Politehnica Brașov won the Brașov Regional Championship and qualify to promotion play-off in Divizia C.

=== Bucharest Municipality ===
Series I

Pos	Team	Pld	W	D	L	GF	GA	GD	Pts	Qualification or relegation
1	TUG București (Q)	26	17	6	3	45	13	+32	40	Qualification to championship final
2	Autobuzul București (Q)	26	14	6	6	41	18	+23	34	Qualification to third place match
3	Abatorul București	26	11	10	5	34	23	+11	32	
4	Armata București	26	13	5	8	32	19	+13	31	
5	Laromet București	26	12	6	8	42	35	+7	30	
6	Granitul București	26	10	9	7	32	26	+6	29	
7	Electromagnetica București	26	9	9	8	34	36	−2	27	
8	Viitorul Electronica București	26	8	9	9	28	30	−2	25	
9	Avântul 9 Mai	26	6	12	8	23	30	−7	24	
10	IOR București	26	7	9	10	32	34	−2	23	
11	ICSIM București	26	5	12	9	23	37	−14	22	
12	Gloria București	26	6	7	13	24	50	−26	19	
13	Semănătoarea București	26	5	7	14	18	29	−11	17	
14	Chimia București	26	3	6	17	17	45	−28	12	

Rules for classification: 1) points; 2) goal difference; 3) number of goals scored.
(Q) Qualified for the phase indicated

Series II

Pos	Team	Pld	W	D	L	GF	GA	GD	Pts	Qualification or relegation
1	Voința București (Q)	26	16	6	4	47	18	+29	38	Qualification to championship final
2	Dinamo Obor București (Q)	26	13	9	4	38	19	+19	35	Qualification to third place match
3	Constructorul București	26	10	9	7	39	22	+17	29	
4	Confecția București	26	12	3	11	28	27	+1	27	
5	CFR BTA București	26	8	11	7	19	21	−2	27	
6	Spic de Grâu București	26	8	9	9	31	27	+4	25	
7	Sirena București	26	7	11	8	26	31	−5	25	
8	Vulcan București	26	7	10	9	25	28	−3	24	
9	Dacia București	26	9	6	11	26	33	−7	24	
10	Quadrat București	26	7	9	10	21	37	−16	23	
11	Automatica București	26	7	8	11	19	26	−7	22	
12	Bere Rahova	26	8	6	12	35	48	−13	22	
13	Luxor București	26	7	8	11	15	24	−9	22	
14	ITB București	26	8	5	13	24	38	−14	21	

Rules for classification: 1) points; 2) goal difference; 3) number of goals scored.
(Q) Qualified for the phase indicated

Third place match

The match was played on 17 June 1967.

Team 1	Score	Team 2
Autobuzul București	2–1	Dinamo Obor București

Championship final

The matches were played on 17 and 24 June 1967.

Team 1	Agg.	Team 2	1st leg	2nd leg
TUG București	6–5	Voința București	4–4	2–1

TUG București won the Bucharest Municipal Championship and qualify to promotion play-off in Divizia C.

=== Bucharest Region ===
East Series

Pos	Team	Pld	W	D	L	GF	GA	GD	Pts	Qualification or relegation
1	Celuloza Călărași (Q)	22	16	1	5	57	18	+39	33	Qualification to championship final
2	DRTA București	22	13	3	6	42	32	+10	29	
3	Unirea Mănăstirea	22	10	4	8	47	39	+8	24	
4	ICAB Arcuda	22	10	4	8	36	48	−12	24	
5	Unirea Satu Mare	22	10	3	9	50	36	+14	23	
6	Locomotiva Fetești	22	9	4	9	37	29	+8	22	
7	Voința Slobozia	22	8	5	9	41	40	+1	21	
8	Victoria Lehliu	22	8	5	9	29	30	−1	21	
9	Cooperatorul Urziceni	22	8	2	12	29	48	−19	18	
10	Aripile CFR Titu	22	6	5	11	28	42	−14	17	
11	Gloria Fundeni	22	7	1	14	38	53	−15	15	
12	Recolta Brezoaele	22	7	1	14	34	59	−25	15	

Rules for classification: 1) Points; 2) Goal difference; 3) Number of goals scored.
(Q) Qualified for the phase indicated

West Series

Pos	Team	Pld	W	D	L	GF	GA	GD	Pts	Qualification or relegation
1	Chimia Turnu Măgurele (Q)	22	15	5	2	68	12	+56	35	Qualification to championship final
2	Olimpia Giurgiu	22	13	2	7	40	29	+11	28	
3	Comerțul Alexandria	22	11	5	6	43	29	+14	27	
4	Victoria Alexandria	22	12	1	9	50	37	+13	25	
5	Flacăra Videle	22	10	5	7	43	30	+13	25	
6	Victoria Turnu Măgurele	22	11	3	8	44	35	+9	25	
7	Spicul Izvoru	22	11	0	11	33	43	−10	22	
8	Teleorman Troianu	22	9	3	10	45	47	−2	21	
9	Tractorul Zimnicea	22	9	3	10	25	44	−19	21	
10	Sporting Roșiori	22	7	5	10	35	42	−7	19	
11	Recolta Traian	22	4	1	17	22	56	−34	9	
12	Progresul Roșiori	22	2	3	17	11	55	−44	7	

Rules for classification: 1) Points; 2) Goal difference; 3) Number of goals scored.
(Q) Qualified for the phase indicated

Championship final

Team 1	Agg.	Team 2	1st leg	2nd leg
Celuloza Călărași	1–2	Chimia Turnu Măgurele	1–1	0–1

Chimia Turnu Măgurele won the Bucharest Regional Championship and qualify to promotion play-off in Divizia C.

=== Cluj Region ===
Someș Series

Pos	Team	Pld	W	D	L	GF	GA	GD	Pts	Qualification or relegation
1	Gloria Bistrița (C, Q)	22	17	3	2	75	16	+59	37	Qualification to championship final
2	Tehnofrig Cluj	22	16	3	3	56	16	+40	35	
3	Progresul Năsăud	22	13	5	4	60	25	+35	31	
4	Someșul Beclean	22	11	2	9	47	42	+5	24	
5	Rapid Jibou	22	9	4	9	37	48	−11	22	
6	Progresul Răscruci	21	8	5	8	23	34	−11	21	
7	Vulturul Mintiu Gherlii	22	8	4	10	37	33	+4	20	
8	Victoria Uriu	22	9	1	12	26	37	−11	19	
9	CIL Gherla	22	8	3	11	42	54	−12	19	
10	Steaua Roșie Zalău	21	7	1	13	30	47	−17	15	
11	Hârtia Prundu Bârgăului	22	4	3	15	20	55	−35	11	
12	Energia Mănăstirea	22	2	4	16	14	60	−46	8	

Rules for classification: 1) Points; 2) Goal difference; 3) Number of goals scored.
(C) Champions; (Q) Qualified for the phase indicated

Mureș Series

Pos	Team	Pld	W	D	L	GF	GA	GD	Pts	Qualification or relegation
1	CFR Cluj (C, Q)	22	14	6	2	60	10	+50	34	Qualification to championship final
2	Unirea Cluj	22	11	9	2	47	19	+28	31	
3	Arieșul Câmpeni	22	10	6	6	32	20	+12	26	
4	Arieșul Câmpia Turzii	22	10	6	6	20	19	+1	26	
5	Minerul Baia de Arieș	22	10	5	7	27	28	−1	25	
6	Olimpia Aiud	22	8	7	7	26	37	−11	23	
7	Locomotiva 16 Februarie Cluj	22	9	3	10	31	29	+2	21	
8	Victoria Someșeni	22	7	6	9	25	26	−1	20	
9	Chimia Turda	22	6	7	9	36	38	−2	19	
10	Cimentul Turda	22	4	7	11	21	30	−9	15	
11	Vlădeasa Huedin	21	4	4	13	23	58	−35	12	
12	Moții Abrud	21	5	0	16	23	57	−34	10	

Rules for classification: 1) Points; 2) Goal difference; 3) Number of goals scored.
(C) Champions; (Q) Qualified for the phase indicated

Championship final

The matches were played on 28 May and 4 June 1967.

Team 1	Agg.	Team 2	1st leg	2nd leg
CFR Cluj	2–3	Gloria Bistrița	1–1	1–2

Gloria Bistrița won the Cluj Regional Championship and qualify to promotion play-off in Divizia C.

=== Crișana Region ===
North Series

Pos	Team	Pld	W	D	L	GF	GA	GD	Pts	Qualification or relegation
1	Unirea Oradea (Q)	22	18	2	2	65	11	+54	38	Qualification to championship final
2	Măgura Șimleu Silvaniei	22	14	4	4	56	25	+31	32	
3	Recolta Valea lui Mihai	22	14	3	5	50	19	+31	31	
4	Minerul Voivozi	22	10	5	7	30	25	+5	25	
5	Bihoreana Marghita	22	10	4	8	34	23	+11	24	
6	Stăruința Săcuieni	22	9	4	9	31	32	−1	22	
7	Minerul Ip	22	9	3	10	32	32	0	21	
8	Foresta Tileagd	22	8	3	11	37	38	−1	19	
9	Minerul Sărmășag	22	8	3	11	19	27	−8	19	
10	Voința Șimian	22	7	2	13	41	73	−32	16	
11	Minerul Șuncuiuș (R)	22	4	1	17	17	62	−45	9	Relegation to Crișana District Championship
12	Recolta Sălard (R)	22	1	4	17	11	56	−45	6	Relegation to Crișana District Championship

Rules for classification: 1) Points; 2) Goal difference; 3) Number of goals scored.
(Q) Qualified for the phase indicated; (R) Relegated

South Series

Pos	Team	Pld	W	D	L	GF	GA	GD	Pts	Qualification or relegation
1	Voința Oradea (Q)	22	17	1	4	61	13	+48	35	Qualification to championship final
2	Dinamo Oradea	22	13	5	4	70	17	+53	31	
3	Victoria Ineu	22	14	2	6	42	25	+17	30	
4	Foresta Beliu	22	13	2	7	42	27	+15	28	
5	Crișana Sebiș	21	11	5	5	50	26	+24	27	
6	Crișul Ineu	22	9	6	7	28	28	0	24	
7	Unirea Sântana	22	9	5	8	22	21	+1	23	
8	Voința Inand	21	8	2	11	31	42	−11	18	
9	Recolta Buteni	22	5	4	13	23	37	−14	14	
10	Victoria Chișineu-Criș	22	5	2	15	20	65	−45	12	
11	Stăruința Satu Nou (R)	22	4	2	16	15	43	−28	10	Relegation to Crișana District Championship
12	Unirea Gurahonț (R)	22	3	0	19	16	76	−60	6	Relegation to Crișana District Championship

Rules for classification: 1) Points; 2) Goal difference; 3) Number of goals scored.
(Q) Qualified for the phase indicated; (R) Relegated

Championship final

Team 1	Agg.	Team 2	1st leg	2nd leg
Voința Oradea	5–4	Unirea Oradea	3–2	2–2

Voința Oradea won the Crișana Regional Championship and qualify to promotion play-off in Divizia C.

=== Dobrogea Region ===
Pos	Team	Pld	W	D	L	GF	GA	GD	Pts	Qualification or relegation
1	Cimentul Medgidia (C, Q)	26	19	4	3	52	19	+33	42	Qualification to promotion play-off
2	Marina Mangalia	26	16	7	3	56	20	+36	39	
3	ITC Constanța	26	14	6	6	32	20	+12	34	
4	Metalul Mangalia	26	13	7	6	44	24	+20	33	
5	CFR Constanța	26	9	6	11	42	37	+5	24	
6	Ideal Cernavodă	26	9	6	11	34	30	+4	24	
7	Victoria Saligny	26	11	2	13	28	36	−8	24	
8	Petrolul Constanța	26	6	11	9	26	29	−3	23	
9	Unirea Murfatlar	26	10	3	13	29	33	−4	23	
10	USAS Năvodari	26	8	7	11	29	38	−9	23	
11	Știința Constanța	26	7	8	11	24	37	−13	22	
12	Celuloza Constanța	26	8	4	14	32	43	−11	20	
13	Callatis Mangalia (R)	26	7	3	16	32	55	−23	17	Relegation to Dobrogea District Championship
14	Tractorul Horia (R)	26	5	6	15	24	63	−39	16	Relegation to Dobrogea District Championship

Rules for classification: 1) points; 2) goal difference; 3) number of goals scored.
(C) Champions; (Q) Qualified for the phase indicated; (R) Relegated

=== Galați Region ===
Pos	Team	Pld	W	D	L	GF	GA	GD	Pts	Qualification or relegation
1	SUT Galați (C, Q)	26	19	5	2	71	27	+44	43	Qualification to promotion play-off
2	Chimica Mărășești	26	18	4	4	90	14	+76	40	
3	Laminorul Brăila	26	16	4	6	63	31	+32	36	
4	Celuloza Brăila	26	13	6	7	56	26	+30	32	
5	Tractorul Viziru	26	13	6	7	46	39	+7	32	
6	Foresta Gugești	26	14	3	9	47	21	+26	31	
7	Metalul Brăila	26	13	2	11	59	39	+20	28	
8	Viitorul Rușețu	26	12	1	13	45	48	−3	25	
9	Tractorul Galați	26	10	5	11	40	50	−10	25	
10	Dunărea Brăila	26	9	4	13	32	41	−9	22	
11	Automobilul Focșani	26	8	4	14	36	43	−7	20	
12	Victoria Horia	26	7	1	18	19	75	−56	15	
13	Unirea ITO Galați	26	4	3	19	23	97	−74	11	
14	Avântul CAP Bucești (R)	26	2	0	24	15	91	−76	4	Relegation to Galați District Championship

Rules for classification: 1) points; 2) goal difference; 3) number of goals scored.
(C) Champions; (Q) Qualified for the phase indicated; (R) Relegated

=== Hunedoara Region ===
Pos	Team	Pld	W	D	L	GF	GA	GD	Pts	Qualification or relegation
1	Aurul Brad (C, Q)	26	18	4	4	65	23	+42	40	Qualification to promotion play-off
2	Știința Petroșani	26	18	3	5	87	22	+65	39	
3	Minerul Teliuc	26	15	0	11	50	33	+17	30	
4	Unirea Alba Iulia	26	15	0	11	45	38	+7	30	
5	CFR Simeria	26	12	4	10	41	45	−4	28	
6	Textila Sebeș	26	12	4	10	37	45	−8	28	
7	Dacia Orăștie	26	12	3	11	60	32	+28	27	
8	Parângul Lonea	26	12	3	11	50	44	+6	27	
9	Minerul Ghelari	26	11	5	10	39	40	−1	27	
10	Minerul Aninoasa	26	12	1	13	52	39	+13	25	
11	Constructorul Hunedoara	26	11	2	13	32	41	−9	24	
12	IGO Deva	26	6	7	13	21	64	−43	19	
13	Minerul Vulcan	26	5	5	16	33	73	−40	15	Spared from relegation
14	Voința Ilia (R)	26	1	3	22	20	93	−73	5 (Note: Voința Ilia withdrew from the championship after 17 rounds and lost all remaining matches with 0–3.)	Relegation to Hunedoara District Championship

Rules for classification: 1) points; 2) goal difference; 3) number of goals scored.
(C) Champions; (Q) Qualified for the phase indicated; (R) Relegated

=== Iași Region ===
Pos	Team	Pld	W	D	L	GF	GA	GD	Pts	Qualification or relegation
1	Medicina Iași (C, Q)	22	19	3	0	88	7	+81	41	Qualification to promotion play-off
2	Rulmentul Bârlad	22	18	1	3	93	18	+75	37	
3	Foresta Ciurea	22	13	4	5	56	23	+33	30	
4	Politehnica Iași	22	10	4	8	32	38	−6	24	
5	Strungul Bârlad	22	10	3	9	44	38	+6	23	
6	Universitatea Iași	22	9	3	10	45	48	−3	21	
7	Instalatorul Iași	22	7	6	9	51	32	+19	20	
8	Siderurgistul Iași	22	8	2	12	22	41	−19	18	
9	Hușana Huși	22	6	2	14	31	71	−40	14	
10	Flamura Murgeni	22	4	4	14	21	45	−24	12	
11	Constructorul Vaslui	22	5	2	15	32	85	−53	12	
12	Recolta Dragalina	22	5	2	15	28	91	−63	12	

Rules for classification: 1) points; 2) goal difference; 3) number of goals scored.
(C) Champions; (Q) Qualified for the phase indicated

=== Maramureș Region ===
Someș Series

Pos	Team	Pld	W	D	L	GF	GA	GD	Pts	Qualification or relegation
1	Unio Satu Mare (Q)	18	14	4	0	69	8	+61	32	Qualification to championship final
2	Topitorul Baia Mare	18	12	3	3	50	13	+37	27	
3	Chimistul Baia Mare	18	9	2	7	30	22	+8	20	
4	Spicul Ardud	18	8	2	8	30	39	−9	18	
5	Minerul Baia Mare II	18	6	5	7	23	26	−3	17	
6	Progresul Cehu Silvaniei	18	6	4	8	24	33	−9	16	
7	Rapid Satu Mare	18	6	4	8	31	46	−15	16	
8	Someșul Satu Mare	18	5	3	10	15	28	−13	13	
9	Spartac Satu Mare	18	4	4	10	25	47	−22	12	
10	Recolta Tășnad	18	3	3	12	17	50	−33	9	

Rules for classification: 1) points; 2) goal difference; 3) number of goals scored.
(Q) Qualified for the phase indicated

Gutin Series

Pos	Team	Pld	W	D	L	GF	GA	GD	Pts	Qualification or relegation
1	Constructorul Baia Mare (Q)	20	12	5	3	53	23	+30	29	Qualification to championship final
2	Băimăreana Baia Mare	20	8	7	5	28	18	+10	23	
3	CIL Sighetu Marmației	20	7	8	5	35	27	+8	22	
4	Bradul Vișeu de Sus	20	8	6	6	34	28	+6	22	
5	Lumina Câmpulung la Tisa	20	9	3	8	25	32	−7	21	
6	Minerul Cavnic	20	7	5	8	27	32	−5	19	
7	Foresta Târgu Lăpuș	20	6	7	7	28	34	−6	19	
8	Minerul Baia Borșa	20	8	2	10	26	30	−4	18	
9	Voința Sighetu Marmației	20	6	5	9	38	37	+1	17	
10	Unirea Seini	20	5	6	9	25	34	−9	16	
11	Energia Negrești-Oaș	20	4	4	12	18	48	−30	12	

Rules for classification: 1) points; 2) goal difference; 3) number of goals scored.
(Q) Qualified for the phase indicated

Championship final

Team 1	Agg.	Team 2	1st leg	2nd leg
Unio Satu Mare	9–2	Constructorul Baia Mare	6–1	3–1

Unio Satu Mare won the Maramureș Regional Championship and qualify to promotion play-off in Divizia C.

=== Mureș Region ===
Series I

Pos	Team	Pld	W	D	L	GF	GA	GD	Pts	Qualification or relegation
1	Lemnarul Târgu Mureș (Q)	22	14	5	3	39	11	+28	33	Qualification to championship final
2	Voința Cristuru Secuiesc	22	12	4	6	47	30	+17	28	
3	Mureșul Luduș	22	11	5	6	43	32	+11	27	
4	Voința Târnăveni	22	9	8	5	33	29	+4	26	
5	Nirajul Miercurea Nirajului	22	10	5	7	33	23	+10	25	
6	Unirea Târnăveni	22	9	7	6	31	24	+7	25	
7	Avântul Reghin	22	9	5	8	31	33	−2	23	
8	Energia Fântânele	22	8	5	9	25	27	−2	21	
9	Viitorul Târgu Mureș	22	6	7	9	21	23	−2	19	
10	Tractorul Sarmaș	22	8	2	12	29	34	−5	18	
11	Gloria Târgu Mureș	22	6	4	12	20	32	−12	16	
12	Voința Târgu Mureș	22	0	3	19	14	68	−54	3	

Rules for classification: 1) points; 2) goal difference; 3) number of goals scored.
(Q) Qualified for the phase indicated

Series II

Pos	Team	Pld	W	D	L	GF	GA	GD	Pts	Qualification or relegation
1	Știința Târgu Mureș (Q)	22	15	4	3	75	19	+56	34	Qualification to championship final
2	Lemnarul Odorheiu Secuiesc	22	14	5	3	59	21	+38	33	
3	Oțelul Târgu Mureș	22	12	4	6	34	25	+9	28	
4	Viitorul Gheorgheni	22	11	3	8	39	31	+8	25	
5	Stăruința Târgu Mureș	22	8	8	6	29	27	+2	24	
6	Metalul Vlăhița	22	8	5	9	32	45	−13	21	
7	Apemin Borsec	22	9	2	11	42	42	0	20	
8	Mureșul Toplița	22	8	4	10	36	40	−4	20	
9	Minerul Miercurea Ciuc	22	8	3	11	40	32	+8	19	
10	Ciocanul Târgu Mureș	22	7	5	10	25	36	−11	19	
11	Minerul Bălan	22	7	4	11	24	42	−18	18	
12	Complexul Gălăuțaș	22	1	1	20	14	89	−75	3	

Rules for classification: 1) points; 2) goal difference; 3) number of goals scored.
(Q) Qualified for the phase indicated

Championship final

The matches were played on 3 and 11 June 1967.

Team 1	Agg.	Team 2	1st leg	2nd leg
Știința Târgu Mureș	2–1	Lemnarul Târgu Mureș	2–1	0–0

Știința Târgu Mureș won the Mureș Regional Championship and qualify to promotion play-off in Divizia C.

=== Oltenia Region ===
Series I

Pos	Team	Pld	W	D	L	GF	GA	GD	Pts	Qualification or relegation
1	Progresul Goicea Mică (Q)	22	15	2	5	37	20	+17	32	Qualification to championship final
2	Răsăritul Caracal	22	13	4	5	35	14	+21	30	
3	Progresul Balș	22	12	4	6	34	26	+8	28	
4	Steagul Roșu Plenița	22	11	4	7	45	22	+23	26	
5	Metalul Craiova	22	12	2	8	42	19	+23	26	
6	Recolta Urzicuța	22	10	5	7	24	22	+2	25	
7	Dunărea Calafat	22	10	3	9	48	28	+20	23	
8	Gloria Băilești	22	8	4	10	29	38	−9	20	
9	Stăruința Craiova	22	7	5	10	29	30	−1	19	
10	Recolta Dăbuleni	22	7	2	13	26	60	−34	16	
11	Unirea Amărăștii de Jos	22	5	3	14	23	57	−34	13	
12	Tractorul Bălcești	22	2	2	18	13	49	−36	6	

Rules for classification: 1) Points; 2) Goal difference; 3) Number of goals scored.
(Q) Qualified for the phase indicated

Series II

Pos	Team	Pld	W	D	L	GF	GA	GD	Pts	Qualification or relegation
1	Minerul Motru (Q)	22	16	3	3	47	11	+36	35	Qualification to championship final
2	Metalurgistul Sadu	22	17	0	5	61	19	+42	34	
3	Armata Craiova	22	14	3	5	47	22	+25	31	
4	Progresul Cârcea	22	12	5	5	62	27	+35	29	
5	Sănătatea CIL Târgu Jiu	22	12	5	5	51	28	+23	29	
6	Energetica Turnu Severin	22	11	3	8	41	34	+7	25	
7	SMT Șimian	22	10	0	12	27	41	−14	20	
8	Dinamo Craiova	21	6	4	11	29	37	−8	16	
9	Minerul Rovinari	21	5	4	12	20	43	−23	14	
10	Gilortul Târgu Cărbunești	22	5	1	16	22	58	−36	11	
11	Olimpia Filiași	22	4	1	17	16	66	−50	9	
12	Victoria Vânju Mare	22	3	1	18	13	56	−43	7	

Rules for classification: 1) Points; 2) Goal difference; 3) Number of goals scored.
(Q) Qualified for the phase indicated

Championship final

The matches were played on 28 May, 4 and 11 June 1967.

Team 1	Series	Team 2	Game 1	Game 2	Game 3
Minerul Motru	1–1	Progresul Goicea Mică	0–0	1–1	0–0 (Note: The match was played on neutral ground at Craiova. Minerul Motru won due to the younger average age.)

Minerul Motru won the Oltenia Regional Championship and qualify to promotion play-off in Divizia C.

=== Ploiești Region ===
East Series

Pos	Team	Pld	W	D	L	GF	GA	GD	Pts	Qualification or relegation
1	Victoria Boboc (Q)	22	12	6	4	36	19	+17	30	Qualification to championship final
2	Progresul Râmnicu Sărat	22	12	3	7	39	22	+17	27	
3	Petrolul Berca	22	10	7	5	31	23	+8	27	
4	Prahova Ploiești	22	7	9	6	28	19	+9	23	
5	Vagonul Ploiești	22	6	10	6	26	22	+4	22	
6	Armata Ploiești	22	8	5	9	28	27	+1	21	
7	Foresta Nehoiu	22	7	7	8	28	33	−5	21	
8	Chimistul Valea Călugărească	22	5	9	8	27	27	0	19	
9	Rafinăria Teleajen	22	7	3	12	18	45	−27	17	
10	Feroemail Ploiești	22	7	2	13	23	42	−19	16	
11	Petrolistul Boldești	22	6	3	13	29	45	−16	15	
12	Metalul Plopeni (D)	22	11	4	7	38	26	+12	26 (Note: Metalul Plopeni merged with Rapid Mizil on 13 March 1967, took their place in Divizia C, and lost all remaining matches with 0–3.)	Withdrew

Rules for classification: 1) points; 2) goal difference; 3) number of goals scored.
(D) Disqualified; (Q) Qualified for the phase indicated
Notes:

West Series

Pos	Team	Pld	W	D	L	GF	GA	GD	Pts	Qualification or relegation
1	Caraimanul Bușteni (Q)	22	15	4	3	36	11	+25	34	Qualification to championship final
2	Carpați Sinaia	22	12	3	7	49	24	+25	27	
3	Rafinăria Câmpina	22	10	7	5	33	24	+9	27	
4	Petrolul Băicoi	22	11	5	6	29	23	+6	27	
5	Victoria Florești	22	11	4	7	28	18	+10	26	
6	IRA Câmpina	22	11	3	8	47	23	+24	25	
7	Electrica Câmpina	22	7	5	10	30	36	−6	19	
8	Muncitorul Schela Mare	22	8	2	12	34	44	−10	18	
9	Bucegi Pucioasa	22	9	0	13	28	43	−15	18	
10	Victoria Moreni	22	5	5	12	15	24	−9	15	
11	Cimentul Fieni	22	4	6	12	20	42	−22	14	
12	Dinamo Caragiale	22	5	4	13	18	55	−37	14 (Note: Dinamo Caragiale was spared from relegation due to the merger between Cimentul Fieni and Electrica Fieni.)	Spared from relegation

Rules for classification: 1) points; 2) goal difference; 3) number of goals scored.
(Q) Qualified for the phase indicated
Notes:

Championship final

The matches were played on 4, 11 and 18 June 1967.

Team 1	Series	Team 2	Game 1	Game 2	Game 3
Victoria Boboc	2–2 (Note: Victoria Boboc won due to the younger average age.)	Caraimanul Bușteni	1–0	0–1	1–1 (Note: The match was played on neutral ground at Ploiești.)

Victoria Boboc won the Ploiești Regional Championship and qualify to promotion play-off in Divizia C.

=== Suceava Region ===
Pos	Team	Pld	W	D	L	GF	GA	GD	Pts	Qualification or relegation
1	Minerul Fundu Moldovei (C, Q)	24	15	5	4	57	24	+33	35	Qualification to promotion play-off
2	Viitorul Botoșani	24	15	4	5	66	20	+46	34	
3	Foresta Gura Humorului	23	14	2	7	52	28	+24	30	
4	Avântul Frasin	24	13	3	8	53	30	+23	29	
5	Bradul Vama	23	11	5	7	55	51	+4	27	
6	CFR Suceava	24	12	2	10	62	48	+14	26	
7	Fulgerul Dorohoi	24	12	0	12	59	60	−1	24	
8	Cooperatorul Fălticeni	24	9	5	10	44	40	+4	23	
9	Unirea Siret	24	11	0	13	45	58	−13	22	
10	Tractorul Săveni	24	9	2	13	32	49	−17	20	
11	Foresta Moldovița	24	7	3	14	35	58	−23	17	
12	IPROFIL Rădăuți	24	6	2	16	24	66	−42	14	
13	Forestierul Falcău	24	4	1	19	16	68	−52	9	

Rules for classification: 1) points; 2) goal difference; 3) number of goals scored.
(C) Champions; (Q) Qualified for the phase indicated

== See also ==
- 1966–67 Divizia A
- 1966–67 Divizia B
- 1966–67 Divizia C
- 1966–67 Cupa României
