= Stadionul Minerul (Motru) =

Stadium in Romania

- Interactive map of Stadionul Minerul
- Address: Str. Molidului, nr. 41
- Location: Motru, Romania
- Coordinates: 44°48′28.2″N 22°57′43.4″E
- Owner: Municipality of Motru
- Operator: Minerul Motru
- Capacity: 5,000
- Surface: Grass

Construction
- Opened: 1962

Tenants
- Minerul Motru (1962–Present); Pandurii Târgu Jiu (2017–2018)

Minerul Stadium is a multi-use stadium in Motru, Romania. It is currently used mostly for football matches and is the home ground of Minerul Motru youth squads. The stadium holds 5,000 people.

During the 2017–18 Liga II season, Pandurii Târgu Jiu played their home matches at the Minerul Stadium because of the rebuilding of the Tudor Vladimirescu Stadium from Târgu Jiu.
