= CS Minerul Motru =

Romanian football club

Minerul Motru
- Full name: Clubul Sportiv Minerul Motru
- Nicknames: Minerii (The Miners); Alb-negrii (The White and Blacks)
- Short name: Minerul
- Founded: 1962; 64 years ago as Minerul Horăști
- Ground: Minerul
- Capacity: 5,000
- Owners: Motru Municipality; Mihai Murdeală; Paul Țuilă
- Manager: Ovidiu Zamța
- League: Liga IV
- 2025–26: Liga IV, Gorj County, 4th of 12
Home colours	Away colours	Third colours

Clubul Sportiv Minerul Motru, commonly known as Minerul Motru is a Romanian amateur football club based in Motru, Gorj County, currently playing in the Liga IV – Gorj County, the fourth tier of the Romanian football league system.

The club was founded in 1962 and enjoyed its most successful period in the second division, playing no less than seventeen seasons between 1973 and 2014. Its best finish came at the end of the 1982–83 and 1996–97 seasons, when it placed 4th.

== History ==
=== Early Years and First Ascents (1962–1975) ===
The history of football in Motru traces back to 1962, when the initiative to form a football team was driven by Hariton Niculescu and Dumitru Dijmărescu, pioneers of the mining industry in the Motru Basin. Initially named Minerul Horăști, the club was based in the village of Însurăței (now part of Motru municipality), where the team members were housed.

The club's first president was Ion Crivăț, the Director of the Leurda Mine, and the team's first coach was Vasile Eordogh, who was also a player and included among others, Bogdan Oprea, Dumitru Pop, Emil Cîșu, Petre Tănase, Petre Hoară, Horațiu Cuțui and the Râbu brothers. The team first played in the Baia de Aramă District Championship and promoted to the Oltenia Regional Championship in 1964.

In 1966, along with the attestation of the city of Motru, the club changed its name to Minerul Motru. In the 1966–67 season, finishing 1st in Series II, Minerul won the Oltenia Region Championship in the final played against Progresul Goicea Mică, after three drawn matches, due to the younger average age of its players.

However, the Miners lost the promotion in front of Victoria Boboc, the Ploiești Region Championship winner, after eliminated in preliminary round Politehnica Brașov, the Brașov Region Championship winner.

=== The Golden Period and Persistent Challenges (1976–1992) ===
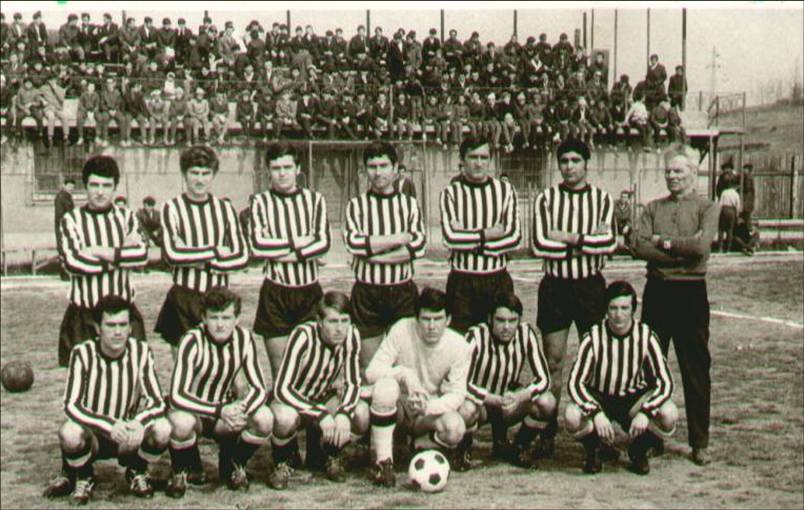
Minerul Motru squad in 1972.

The Miners reached Divizia C in 1968, finishing 2nd in the second series of the Oltenia Regional Championship. After five seasons in the third division, with rankings of 7th in the 1968–69 season, 12th in 1969–70—just one point above the relegation line—11th in 1970–71, and 4th in 1971–72, promotion to Divizia B was achieved at the end of the 1972–73 season.

The first season in Divizia B was tough; Minerul finished 15th out of 18, tied on points with Gaz Metan Mediaș, and was relegated back to Divizia C at goal difference.

However, the White and Blacks quickly returned to the second division, finishing 1st in the fourth series at the end of the 1974–75 season. Unfortunately, struggling to stay in Divizia B, Minerul ranked 15th once again in the following season, and were relegated back to the third division.

In Divizia C, the Miners competed in the seventh series, achieving consistent mid-to-upper table finishes. The team ranked 3rd in the 1976–77 season and made a notable run in the Cupa României, defeating Chimia Râmnicu Vâlcea 3–2, Metalurgistul Sadu 4–3, and Politehnica Timișoara 2–1 before suffering a heavy 0–6 defeat against Steaua București in the Round of 16. The squad included players such as Nae, Bălan, Firțulescu, Copil, Stere, Truică, Ciornoavă, Rădoi, Săvulea, Țurcanu, Mănăitu, Gutuie, Mateescu, Nicoloff I and Nicoloff II. Subsequent seasons saw finishes of 7th in 1977–78, 5th in 1978–79, 4th in 1979–80, and 5th in 1980–81.

In the 1981–82 season, Minerul finished 1st in its series promoted to second division once again. The squad led by Titu Nicolicescu was composed from following players: Lupui, Anghel, Mircea Pruteanu, Bălan, Văduva, Nicolae Ciornoavă, Mirea, Ionel Catană, Cățan, Mihai Ghițulescu, Mircea Gașpar, Lazăr, Marcel Ploaie, Nicolae Laurențiu, Aspricioiu, Mircea Drăguț, Mihordea, Gutuie, Nicoloff, Dan Stoenac, Tudor Dobrică and Ion Alecu.

Minerul competed in the second division for three consecutive seasons. In the 1982–83 season, the team finished a respectable 4th out of 18. However, in 1983–84, there was a slight decline, finishing 11th out of 18. Unfortunately, in the 1984–85 season, Minerul ended up in 18th place out of 18, resulting in relegation to the third division.

In the following three seasons in the third division, Minerul placed 8th in 1985–86 under the guidance of Constantin Oțet. The team narrowly missed promotion in 1986–87, finishing as runners-up just one point behind Gloria Reșița. Finally, in the 1987–88 season, Minerul secured 1st place, earning a return to Divizia B.

In the 1988–89 season, Minerul secured a 13th-place finish out of 18, under coach Costică Toma, successfully maintaining its status in the second division. The following season showed improvement, with Minerul climbing to a safer 9th-place position. However, in the 1990–91 season, Minerul faced significant challenges and finished in 17th place, which ultimately led to relegation back to Divizia C.

=== Rebuilding, Decline, and Revival (1993–Present) ===
In the 1991–92 season, Minerul finished mid-table, securing 7th place in Series IX of the third division. However, following a reorganization of the competitive system in the summer of 1992, the team was relegated to the Gorj County Championship.

In the 1992–93 season, Minerul reached the Round of 16 in the Cupa României, where it was narrowly defeated 0–1 by Dacia Unirea Brăila. However, after an unsuccessful promotion attempt that season, club president Marcu Burtea decided to merge Minerul with the third-division team Venus Lugoj through absorption, renaming the club Minerul Venus Motru. Taking Venus' place in the third division, the team finished the 1993–94 season as runners-up in Series IV.

In the 1994–95 season, Minerul won Series III of the third division under the guidance of Silviu Lung, earning a return to the second division.

Assigned to Series II, Minerul played four consecutive seasons in Divizia B. In the 1995–96 season, the team ended in 11th place, but showed improvement in the 1996–97 season, finishing 4th. The next two years saw consistent mid-table results, with 7th place in 1997–98 and 9th place in 1998–99. However, the 1999–2000 season proved difficult, and a last-place finish resulted in relegation to the third division.

Minerul finished as runners-up in Series V of Divizia C for two consecutive seasons. In the 2000–01 campaign, the team was tied on points with Internațional Pitești, narrowly missing out on promotion due to tiebreaker criteria. The following season, Minerul again came close, finishing just one point behind Gilortul Târgu Cărbunești.

In the 2002–03 season, Minerul finished 2nd in Series V of Divizia C and earned promotion to Divizia B. Under the guidance of Gabriel Zahiu, the team reached the Round of 32 in the Cupa României, defeating second division sides Extensiv Craiova (1–1, 6–4 on penalties) and Gilortul Târgu Cărbunești (2–0), before being eliminated by first division side FCM Bacău following a 2–2 draw and a 5–6 defeat in the penalty shootout. The squad included players such as Antici, Ștefănică, Purcel, I. Constantin, Mirea, Ploscariu, Pătrașcu, Bertea, P. Gheorghe, A. Soo, Crișanov, Volocaru, Nueleanu and Glișcă.

In Divizia B, Minerul competed in Series II, finishing 10th in both the 2003–04 and 2004–05 seasons under Gabriel Zahiu, who was replaced in January 2005 by Pavel Buburuz. Silviu Lung was appointed head coach for the 2005–06 season, but due to disappointing results, he left the team in April 2006. Although he initially reconsidered his resignation, he was ultimately replaced by Marcel Ploaie as Minerul finished 11th and was relegated following a league restructuring from three to two series,

In the 2006–07 season of Liga III, Minerul secured a 2nd place finish in Series IV, earning a spot in the promotion play-offs. Unfortunately, the team lost both matches, suffering heavy defeats against Luceafărul Lotus Băile Felix (0–3) and Mureșul Deva (0–5), finishing last in Group II. The squad, led by Marin Tudorache, who replaced Marcel Ploaie with four rounds left in the season, included players such as Ciucă, Naicu, V. Prodan, Bălan, Murdărea, Ioniță, A. Soo, Istinie, Ursu, Moican, Apostol, Nicoloff, Bucă, Trifu, and Glișcă.

Minerul continued in Liga III for the following seasons, achieving mixed results. Under Gabriel Zahiu, the team finished 3rd in Series V in 2007–08, followed by a 7th-place finish in Series IV in 2008–09. Subsequently, Constantin Andriucă was appointed as head coach in October 2009, but a series of poor results led to Ștefan Nanu taking over in April 2010, yet the relegation could no longer be avoided, as Minerul ended the 2009–10 season in 15th place in Series IV.

To retain their third division status, the White and Blacks acquired the place of Minerul Mehedinți. Under Nanu, the team steadily improved, competing in Series IV and finishing 7th in 2010–11, 2nd in 2011–12, and ultimately winning the series in 2012–13 to secure a long-awaited promotion to the second division after seven years.

Minerul struggled during the 2013–14 Liga II campaign, with Ștefan Nanu leaving the team after five rounds in October following four consecutive defeats. Following a brief interim period led by assistants Petre Gheorghe and Liviu Cojocaru, Gabriel Zahiu returned as head coach, under whom the team finished 12th in the regular season and 10th after the play-out stage of Series II, resulting in relegation.

Returning to Liga III, Minerul competed in Series IV and finished 11th in the 2014–15 season, then endured a difficult 2015–16 campaign, finishing last in the series. However, in the summer of 2016, faced with serious financial problems, the senior team was disbanded, and the club continued to operate only at youth level.

In the summer of 2021, it was announced that the senior team of Minerul started again its activity, after five years.

== Honours ==
Chart showing the progress of Minerul Motru's league finishes from 1966 until the present.

Liga III

- Winners (7): 1972–73, 1974–75, 1981–82, 1987–88, 1994–95, 2001–02, 2012–13
- Runners-up (5): 1986–87, 1993–94, 2000–01, 2006–07, 2011–12

=== Other performances ===
- Appearances in Liga II: 17
- Best finish in Liga II: 4th (1982–83, 1996–97)
- Best finish in Cupa României: Round of 16 (1976–77 and 1992–93)

== Notable former players ==
The footballers enlisted below have had international cap(s) for their respective countries at junior and/or senior level and/or more than 50 caps for CS Minerul Motru.

- (Romania) Aurel Amzucu
- (Romania) Augustin Chiriță
- (Romania) Cătălin Crăciunescu
- (Romania) Cornel Frăsineanu
- (Bosnia and Herzegovina) Nenad Kutlačić
- (Romania) Victor Naicu
- (Romania) Florea Martinovici
- (Romania) Daniel Stana

== Former managers ==
- (Romania) Constantin Oțet (1985–1986)
- (Romania) Silviu Lung (1995)
- (Romania) Silviu Lung (1996–1997)
- (Romania) Gheorghe Borugă (January 1997- June 1997)
- (Romania) Victor Roșca (1998)
- (Romania) Gheorghe Borugă (June 1998- October 1999)
- (Romania) Adrian Ionescu (October 1999- June 2000)
- (Romania) Gabriel Zahiu (2002–2005)
- (Romania) Pavel Buburuz (2005)
- (Romania) Silviu Lung (2005–2006)
- (Romania) Marin Tudorache (2007)
- (Romania) Constantin Andriucă (2009–2010)
- (Romania) Ștefan Nanu (April 2010– October 2013)
- (Romania) Dan Stoenac (October 2013)
- (Romania) Gabriel Zahiu (October 2013– June 2016)
- (Romania) Dorin Catană (August 2021– June 2023)
- (Romania) Ovidiu Zamța (July 2023– )
