= Cătălin Crăciunescu =

Romanian footballer

Personal information
- Full name: Cătălin Petre Crăciunescu
- Date of birth: 16 September 1977 (age 49)
- Place of birth: Motru, Romania
- Height: 1.80 m (5 ft 11 in)
- Position: Defender

Senior career*
Years	Team	Apps	(Gls)
1995–1996	Minerul Motru	25	(0)
1996–1999	FC U Craiova	76	(0)
1999–2000	Rocar București	17	(0)
2000	FC U Craiova	6	(0)
2001	Progresul București	3	(0)
2001–2003	FC U Craiova	22	(0)
2003	Dinamo București	0	(0)
2004	FC U Craiova	0	(0)
2004–2005	Pandurii Târgu Jiu	23	(0)
2005–2007	FC U Craiova	12	(0)
Total		184	(0)

International career
1995	Romania U18	2	(0)
1996–1999	Romania U21	15	(0)
1996–1998	Romania B	2	(0)
- * Club domestic league appearances and goals

Cătălin Petre Crăciunescu (born 16 September 1977) is a Romanian former footballer who played as a defender and midfielder.

== Honours ==
Universitatea Craiova

- Cupa României runner-up: 1997–98
- Divizia B: 2005–06

Pandurii Târgu Jiu

- Divizia B: 2004–05
