= 1972–73 Cupa României =

Tournament details
- Country: Romania

Final positions
- Champions: Chimia Râmnicu Vâlcea
- Runners-up: Constructorul Galați

The 1972–73 Cupa României was the 35th edition of Romania's most prestigious football cup competition.

The title was won by Chimia Râmnicu Vâlcea against Constructorul Galați.

== Format ==
The competition is an annual knockout tournament.

In the first round proper, two pots were made, first pot with Divizia A teams and other teams till 16 and the second pot with the rest of teams qualified in this phase. Each tie is played as a single leg.

First round proper matches are played on the ground of the lowest ranked team, then from the second round proper the matches are played on a neutral location.

In the first round proper, if a match is drawn after 90 minutes, the game goes in extra time, and if the scored is still tight after 120 minutes, the team who played away will qualify.

From the second round proper, if a match is drawn after 90 minutes, the game goes in extra time, and if the scored is still tight after 120 minutes, then the team from the lower division will qualify. If the teams are from the same division, the winner will be established at penalty kicks.

In the final, if a match is drawn after 90 minutes, the game goes in extra time, and if the scored is still tight after 120 minutes, a replay will be played.

From the first edition, the teams from Divizia A entered in competition in sixteen finals, rule which remained till today.

== Bracket ==
Round of 32
Chimia Râmnicu Vâlcea	1
Steagul Roșu Brașov	0
Ceahlăul Piatra Neamț	1
CFR Cluj (a.e.t.)	1
CFR Pașcani	1
Argeș Pitești	2
CSM Sibiu	1
FC Constanța (a.e.t.)	1
Metalul București	4
Universitatea Craiova	0
Autobuzul București	3
UTA Arad (a.e.t.)	3
Progresul București	1
Petrolul Ploiești (a.e.t.)	1
FC Galaţi	1
CSM Reșița	0
Constructorul Galați	1
Jiul Petroşani	0
Chimia Făgăraş	0
Dinamo București	7
Vagonul Arad	0
SC Bacău	4
Carpați Sinaia	0
Rapid București (a.e.t.)	0
Minerul Lupeni	0
Steaua București	1
Știința Petroșani	2
ASA 1962 Târgu Mureș	1
Metalul Oradea	1
Universitatea Cluj	4
Bihor Oradea	0
Sportul Studențesc	1

Round of 16
Chimia Râmnicu Vâlcea	1
CFR Cluj	0
Argeș Pitești	2
FC Constanța	1
Metalul București (a.e.t.)	1
UTA Arad	1
Petrolul Ploiești	2
FC Galaţi	1
Constructorul Galați	1
Dinamo București	0
SC Bacău	2
Rapid București	1
Steaua București	4
Știința Petroșani	1
Universitatea Cluj (p)	1 (4)
Sportul Studențesc	1 (3)

Quarter-finals
Chimia Râmnicu Vâlcea	2
Argeș Pitești	1
Metalul București (a.e.t.)	1
Petrolul Ploiești	1
Constructorul Galați (a.e.t.)	1
SC Bacău	1
Steaua București	1
Universitatea Cluj	0

Semi-finals
Chimia Rm. Vâlcea (p)	2 (5)
Metalul București	2 (4)
Constructorul Galați (a.e.t.)	2
Steaua București	2

Final
Chimia Râmnicu Vâlcea	3
Constructorul Galați	0

== First round proper ==
Team 1	Score	Team 2
2 December 1972
Chimia Făgăraş (Div. D)	0–7	(Div. A) Dinamo București
Constructorul Galați (Div. C)	1–0	(Div. A) Jiul Petroşani
Metalul Oradea (Div. D)	1–4	(Div. A) Universitatea Cluj
3 December 1972
Vagonul Arad (Div. C)	0–4	(Div. A) SC Bacău
Metalul București (Div. B)	4–0	(Div. A) Universitatea Craiova
Autobuzul București (Div. C)	3–3 (a.e.t.)	(Div. A) UTA Arad
Progresul București (Div. B)	1–1 (a.e.t.)	(Div. A) Petrolul Ploiești
FC Galaţi (Div. B)	1–0	(Div. A) CSM Reșița
Minerul Lupeni (Div. C)	0–1	(Div. A) Steaua București
Bihor Oradea (Div. B)	0–1	(Div. A) Sportul Studențesc București
CFR Pașcani (Div. B)	1–2	(Div. A) Argeș Pitești
Știința Petroșani (Div. C)	2–1	(Div. A) ASA 1962 Târgu Mureș
Ceahlăul Piatra Neamț (Div. B)	1–1 (a.e.t.)	(Div. A) CFR Cluj
Chimia Râmnicu Vâlcea (Div. B)	1–0	(Div. A) Steagul Roșu Brașov
CSM Sibiu (Div. B)	1–1 (a.e.t.)	(Div. A) FC Constanța
Carpați Sinaia (Div. C)	0–0 (a.e.t.)	(Div. A) Rapid București

== Second round proper ==
Team 1	Score	Team 2
30 May 1973
Universitatea Cluj	1–1 (a.e.t.) (4–3 p)	Sportul Studențesc București
Argeș Pitești	2–1	FC Constanța
Petrolul Ploiești	2–1	FC Galaţi
SC Bacău	2–1	Rapid București
Chimia Râmnicu Vâlcea	1–0	CFR Cluj
Constructorul Galați	1–0	Dinamo București
Steaua București	4–1	Știința Petroșani
Metalul București	1–1 (a.e.t.)	UTA Arad

== Quarter-finals ==
Team 1	Score	Team 2
24 June 1973
Steaua București	1–0	Universitatea Cluj
Constructorul Galați	1–1 (a.e.t.)	SC Bacău
Metalul București	1–1 (a.e.t.)	Petrolul Ploiești
Chimia Râmnicu Vâlcea	2–1	Argeș Pitești

== Semi-finals ==
Team 1	Score	Team 2
27 June 1973
Chimia Râmnicu Vâlcea	2–2 (a.e.t.) (5–4 p)	Metalul București
Constructorul Galați	2–2 (a.e.t.)	Steaua București

== Final ==
1 July 1973
17:30 EET

Chimia Râmnicu Vâlcea	1–1 (a.e.t.)	Constructorul Galați
Şutru 39'	Report	Cernega 65'

23 August, Bucharest
Attendance: 8,000
Referee: Aurel Bentu (Bucharest)

== Replay ==
3 July 1973
17:30 EET

Chimia Râmnicu Vâlcea	3–0	Constructorul Galați
Iordache 8'; Gojgaru 54', 86'	Report

23 August, Bucharest
Attendance: 8,000
Referee: Nicolae Petriceanu (Bucharest)

Cupa României 1972–73 winners

1st title
