= Constructorul Galați =

Romanian football club

- Full name: Constructorul Galați
- Founded: 1950
- Dissolved: 1975
- Ground: Constructorul, Galați
- Capacity: 2,000
Home colours

Constructorul Galați was a football team from Galați, Galați County, Romania.

== History ==
Constructorul Galați was a small team, with many names along the history. They never played in the first league of Romanian football. They wrote history in the 1972–73 Cupa României when they played the final as a Divizia C team after they eliminated Steaua București and Dinamo București, the two most important teams in Romanian football, but they lost "The final of the poor" in front of Divizia B team Chimia Râmnicu Vâlcea . The 1972–73 season was the most successful season in the club's history because it was also the season they won their series from the third league of Romanian football, which gained them the promotion to the second one. In 1975, Constructorul Galați moved in Tecuci, becoming Victoria Tecuci.

== Chronology of names ==
Name	Period
Constructorul Galați	1950–1964
Constructorul I.C.M.S.G.	1964–1965
S.U.T.	1965–1971
Constructorul Galați	1971–1975

== Performances ==
Cupa României

- Finalist (1): 1972–73

Divizia C

- Champion (1): 1972–73
