= 2001–02 Divizia B =

62nd season of second-tier football league in Romania

Divizia B
- Season: 2001–02
- Promoted: AEK București; UTA Arad
- Relegated: Dinamo Poiana Câmpina; Olimpia Satu Mare; Petrolul Moinești; ASA Târgu Mureș; Laminorul Roman; Jiul Petroșani; Rocar București; Politehnica Timișoara
- Top goalscorer: Zoltán Csehi (18 goals)

The 2001–02 Divizia B was the 62nd season of the second tier of the Romanian football league system.

The format has been changed from two series of 18 teams to two series, each of them having 16 teams. At the end of the season, the winners of the series promoted to Divizia A and the last four places from both series relegated to Divizia C. A promotion play-off was played between the 13th and 14th-placed in the Divizia A and the runners-up of the Divizia B series.

== Team changes ==
=== To Divizia B ===
Relegated from Divizia A

- Foresta Fălticeni
- Rocar București
- Gaz Metan Mediaș

Promoted from Divizia C

- Petrolul Moinești
- Dacia Unirea Brăila
- Inter Gaz București
- Electromagnetica București
- Internațional Pitești
- Minaur Zlatna
- Industria Sârmei Câmpia Turzii
- Universitatea Cluj

=== From Divizia B ===
Promoted to Divizia A

- Sportul Studențesc
- UM Timișoara
- Farul Constanța

Relegated to Divizia C

- Metrom Brașov
- Apemin Borsec
- Drobeta-Turnu Severin
- Corvinul Hunedoara
- Callatis Mangalia
- Electro Craiova
- Juventus București
- FCM Râmnicu Vâlcea
- Precizia Săcele
- Cetate Deva
- Politehnica Iași
- Inter Sibiu

=== Other changes ===
Fulgerul Bragadiru was renamed AEK București.

Electromagnetica București started to be the second squad of Rapid București.

Metalul Plopeni started to be the second squad of Astra Ploiești.

== League map ==
Locations of Divizia B clubs by series
Seria I Seria II

== League tables ==
=== Seria I ===
Pos	Team	Pld	W	D	L	GF	GA	GD	Pts	Qualification
1	AEK București (C, P)	30	19	2	9	55	37	+18	59	Promotion to Divizia A
2	Cimentul Fieni	30	16	6	8	42	18	+24	54	Qualification to promotion play-off
3	Electromagnetica București	30	16	3	11	51	41	+10	51	Ineligible for promotion
4	Midia Năvodari	30	14	7	9	39	33	+6	49	
5	Metalul Plopeni	30	15	6	9	41	31	+10	45 (Note: Metalul Plopeni were deducted 6 points and lost 0–3 the match against Rocar București (round 15), after an attempt of match fixing.)	Ineligible for promotion
6	Inter Gaz București	30	13	6	11	37	29	+8	45	
7	FC Onești	30	12	7	11	34	37	−3	43	
8	Tractorul Brașov (Note: Tractorul Brașov withdrew at the end of the season and sell its place to Bucovina Suceava.) (R)	30	12	7	11	31	26	+5	43	Relegation to Divizia C
9	ARO Câmpulung	30	12	6	12	37	38	−1	42	
10	Foresta Suceava	30	12	6	12	44	41	+3	42	
11	Diplomatic Focșani	30	10	8	12	29	32	−3	38	
12	Dacia Unirea Brăila	30	11	4	15	30	37	−7	37	
13	Dinamo Poiana Câmpina (R)	30	12	7	11	43	38	+5	37 (Note: Dinamo Poiana Câmpina were deducted 6 points for some irregularities.)	Relegation to Divizia C
14	Petrolul Moinești (R)	30	9	6	15	37	48	−11	33	Relegation to Divizia C
15	Laminorul Roman (R)	30	9	3	18	36	51	−15	30	Relegation to Divizia C
16	Rocar București (R)	30	5	2	23	12	61	−49	14 (Note: Rocar București were deducted 3 points and lost 0–3 the match against Metalul Plopeni (round 15), after an attempt of match fixing. Subsequently, Rocar withdrew during the winter break and forfeited all their matches from the second half of the season.)	Relegation to Divizia C

Updated to match(es) played on 30 June 2002. Source: romaniansoccer.ro (in Romanian)
Rules for classification: 1) Points; 2) Head-to-head points; 3) Head-to-head goal difference; 4) Head-to-head goals scored; 5) Head-to-head away goals scored; 6) Goal difference; 7) Goals scored.
(C) Champions; (P) Promoted; (R) Relegated

=== Seria II ===
Pos	Team	Pld	W	D	L	GF	GA	GD	Pts	Qualification
1	UTA Arad (C, P)	30	19	6	5	48	21	+27	63	Promotion to Divizia A
2	Baia Mare	30	19	6	5	60	21	+39	63	Qualification to promotion play-off
3	Bihor Oradea	30	14	8	8	45	28	+17	50	
4	Extensiv Craiova	30	14	8	8	45	26	+19	50	
5	Internațional Pitești	30	13	7	10	45	35	+10	46	
6	CSM Reșița	30	13	7	10	38	37	+1	46	
7	Apulum Alba Iulia	30	12	8	10	46	46	0	44	
8	Minaur Zlatna	30	11	8	11	37	38	−1	41	
9	Pandurii Târgu Jiu	30	10	11	9	31	27	+4	41	
10	Universitatea Cluj	30	11	7	12	51	40	+11	40	
11	Industria Sârmei Câmpia Turzii	30	12	4	14	39	45	−6	40	
12	Gaz Metan Mediaș	30	13	7	10	45	30	+15	39 (Note: Gaz Metan Mediaș were deducted 7 points for failing to reach the 25-point minimum in Divizia A last season.)	
13	Olimpia Satu Mare (Note: Olimpia Satu Mare was spared from relegation after it bought, at the end of the season, the place of newly promoted Metrom Brașov.)	30	11	1	18	46	56	−10	34	Spared from relegation
14	ASA Târgu Mureș (R)	30	10	4	16	36	48	−12	34	Relegation to Divizia C
15	Jiul Petroșani (R)	30	7	4	19	32	56	−24	25	Relegation to Divizia C
16	Politehnica Timișoara (R)	30	1	4	25	15	105	−90	−8 (Note: Politehnica Timișoara were deducted 15 points (1 for each day of late transfer fees).)	Relegation to Divizia C

Updated to match(es) played on 30 June 2002. Source: romaniansoccer.ro (in Romanian)
Rules for classification: 1) Points; 2) Head-to-head points; 3) Head-to-head goal difference; 4) Head-to-head goals scored; 5) Head-to-head away goals scored; 6) Goal difference; 7) Goals scored.
(C) Champions; (P) Promoted; (R) Relegated

== Divizia A play-off ==
The 13th and 14th-placed teams of the Divizia A faced the 2nd-placed teams of the Divizia B.

Team 1	Agg.	Team 2	1st leg	2nd leg
Sportul Studențesc	5–1	Cimentul Fieni	3–0	2–1
Farul Constanța	1–0	Baia Mare	1–0	0–0

8 June 2002	Cimentul Fieni	0–3	Sportul Studențesc	Fieni
		Report	Bălan 36'; Mazilu 40'; Diniță 90'	Stadium: Cimentul

8 June 2002	Farul Constanța	1–0	Baia Mare	Constanța
	Ad. Voicu 35'	Report		Stadium: Farul

12 June 2002	Sportul Studențesc	2–1	Cimentul Fieni	Bucharest
	Bălan 24'; Diniță 54'	Report	Albulescu 44'	Stadium: Regie

12 June 2002	Baia Mare	0–0	Farul Constanța	Baia Mare
		Report		Stadium: Dealul Florilor

== Top scorers ==
18 goals

- (Hungary) Zoltán Csehi (Bihor Oradea)

12 goals

- (Romania) Daniel Stan (Internațional Pitești)

11 goals

- (Romania) Alexandru Bălțoi (Poiana Câmpina)

10 goals

- (Romania) Remus Safta (AEK București)

9 goals

- (Romania) Marius Safta (ARO Câmpulung)

8 goals

- (Romania) Virgil Lăscărache (Inter Gaz București)
- (Romania) Claudiu Boaru (Gaz Metan Mediaș)
- (Romania) Marius Păcurar (Foresta Suceava)
- (Romania) Marius Bilașco (Baia Mare)

7 goals

- (Romania) Mihai Ilie (Cimentul Fieni)
- (Romania) Viorel Dinu (Electromagnetica București)
- (Romania) Constantin Romeo Stancu (AEK București)
- (Romania) Radu Neguț (IS Câmpia Turzii)

== See also ==
- 2001–02 Divizia A
- 2001–02 Divizia C
- 2001–02 Divizia D
- 2001–02 Cupa României
