= 2002–03 Divizia B =

63rd season of Romania's Divizia B

Divizia B
- Season: 2002–03
- Country: Romania
- Teams: 32 (2x16)
- Promoted: Petrolul Ploiești; Apulum Alba Iulia; Oradea
- Relegated: Bucovina Suceava; Gilortul Târgu Cărbunești; Foresta Fălticeni; UM Timișoara
- Top goalscorer: Dan Codreanu (14 goals)

The 2002–03 Divizia B was the 63rd season of the second tier of the Romanian football league system.

The format has been maintained to two series, each of them having 16 teams. At the end of the season, the winners of the series promoted to Divizia A and the last two places from both series relegated to Divizia C. A promotion play-off was played between the 13th and 14th-placed in the Divizia A and the runners-up of the Divizia B series.

== Team changes ==
=== To Divizia B ===
Relegated from Divizia A

- Petrolul Ploiești
- UM Timișoara

Promoted from Divizia C

- Poli Unirea Iași
- Gloria Buzău
- Medgidia
- Rulmentul Alexandria
- Gilortul Târgu Cărbunești
- Corvinul Hunedoara
- CFR Cluj

=== From Divizia B ===
Promoted to Divizia A

- AEK București
- UTA Arad

Relegated to Divizia C

- Dinamo Poiana Câmpina
- Petrolul Moinești
- Laminorul Roman
- Rocar București
- ASA Târgu Mureș
- Jiul Petroșani

=== Other changes ===
- AEK București merged with Politehnica Timișoara, which had been relegated in the previous season, and was absorbed by the latter. Politehnica played directly in the first tier instead of the third tier and was renamed Politehnica AEK Timișoara.
- Olimpia Satu Mare, which was relegated in the previous season, bought the place of Tractorul Brașov, which thus competed in the third tier.
- Bucovina Suceava broke its alliance with Foresta Fălticeni, bought the place of newly promoted Metrom Brașov, and was thus enrolled directly in the second tier, with the latter subsequently dissolved.
- Foresta Suceava was moved back from Suceava to Fălticeni and renamed Foresta Fălticeni.
- Diplomatic Focșani was renamed Unirea Focșani.
- Poli Unirea Iași was renamed Politehnica Iași.
- FC Bihor Oradea was renamed FC Oradea.

== League tables ==
=== Series I ===
Pos	Team	Pld	W	D	L	GF	GA	GD	Pts	Qualification or relegation
1	Petrolul Ploiești (C, P)	30	18	7	5	42	19	+23	61	Promotion to Divizia A
2	Gloria Buzău	30	16	7	7	44	31	+13	55	Qualification to promotion play-off
3	Onești	30	15	4	11	55	35	+20	49	
4	Midia Năvodari	30	15	4	11	45	43	+2	49	
5	Politehnica Iași	30	13	7	10	41	32	+9	46	
6	Electromagnetica București	30	14	4	12	41	46	−5	46	Ineligible for promotion
7	Inter Gaz București	30	11	9	10	37	31	+6	42	
8	Dacia Unirea Brăila	30	12	6	12	32	31	+1	42	
9	Metalul Plopeni	30	12	5	13	33	40	−7	41	
10	Unirea Focșani	30	12	5	13	34	35	−1	41	
11	Internațional Pitești	30	12	5	13	41	32	+9	41	
12	Medgidia	30	11	5	14	36	41	−5	38	
13	Cimentul Fieni	30	10	5	15	31	45	−14	35 (Note: The Round 29 match between Cimentul Fieni and Bucovina Suceava was not scheduled, as both teams were suspended due to unpaid contractual fees; the match was awarded as a 0–3 defeat to both teams.)	
14	Bucovina Suceava (Note: Bucovina Suceava was not scheduled twice due to financial reasons and was excluded.) (R)	30	9	7	14	25	38	−13	34	Relegation to Divizia C
15	Rulmentul Alexandria (Note: Rulmentul Alexandria was spared from relegation due to Bucovina Suceava's exclusion.)	30	8	3	19	29	48	−19	27	Spared from relegation
16	Foresta Fălticeni (R)	30	7	5	18	26	51	−25	26	Relegation to Divizia C

Source: romaniansoccer.ro (in Romanian)
Rules for classification: 1) Points; 2) Head-to-head points; 3) Head-to-head goal difference; 4) Head-to-head goals scored; 5) Head-to-head away goals scored; 6) Goal difference; 7) Goals scored.
(C) Champions; (P) Promoted; (R) Relegated

=== Series II ===
Pos	Team	Pld	W	D	L	GF	GA	GD	Pts	Qualification or relegation
1	Apulum Alba Iulia (C, P)	28	21	3	4	69	23	+46	66	Promotion to Divizia A
2	Oradea (O, P)	28	18	4	6	51	22	+29	58	Qualification to promotion play-off
3	Gaz Metan Mediaș	28	16	4	8	44	21	+23	52	
4	IS Câmpia Turzii	28	12	12	4	39	20	+19	48	
5	Olimpia Satu Mare	28	14	5	9	44	33	+11	47	
6	CFR Cluj	28	12	10	6	52	26	+26	46	
7	Corvinul Hunedoara	28	13	7	8	47	40	+7	46	
8	Extensiv Craiova	28	12	7	9	37	34	+3	43	
9	Universitatea Cluj	28	8	10	10	48	44	+4	34	
10	ARO Câmpulung	28	8	8	12	23	36	−13	32	
11	Reșița	28	8	5	15	30	63	−33	29	
12	Pandurii Târgu Jiu	28	7	7	14	23	37	−14	28	
13	Minaur Zlatna	28	7	6	15	25	44	−19	27	
14	Baia Mare	28	7	5	16	26	42	−16	26	
15	Gilortul Târgu Cărbunești (Note: Gilortul Târgu Cărbunești withdrew during the winter break and lost 0–3 all the matches from the second part of the season.) (R)	28	0	1	27	3	76	−73	1	Relegation to Divizia C
16	UM Timișoara (R)	0	0	0	0	0	0	0	0 (Note: UMT Timișoara were deducted 7 points due to not achieving the 25 points limit in the Divizia A, last season. UMT was subsequently excluded due to financial problems and all their results were cancelled.)	Relegation to Divizia C

Source: romaniansoccer.ro (in Romanian)
Rules for classification: 1) Points; 2) Head-to-head points; 3) Head-to-head goal difference; 4) Head-to-head goals scored; 5) Head-to-head away goals scored; 6) Goal difference; 7) Goals scored.
(C) Champions; (O) Play-off winners; (P) Promoted; (R) Relegated

== Top scorers ==
14 goals

- (Romania) Dan Codreanu (Universitatea Cluj)

12 goals

- (Romania) Ovidiu Maier (Apulum Alba Iulia)
- (Romania) Cătălin Bozdog (Olimpia Satu Mare)

10 goals

- (Hungary) Zoltán Csehi (FC Oradea)

9 goals

- (Romania) George Florescu (Universitatea Cluj)
- (Romania) Cosmin Tilincă (CFR Cluj)

8 goals

- (Romania) Tudorel Stanciu (Unirea Focșani)
- (Romania) Bogdan Vrăjitoarea (FC Oradea)
- (Romania) Daniel Stan (Internațional Pitești)

7 goals

- (Romania) Sorin Oncică (CFR Cluj)
- (Romania) Claudiu Boaru (Gaz Metan Mediaș)

== See also ==
- 2002–03 Divizia A
- 2002–03 Divizia C
- 2002–03 Divizia D
- 2002–03 Cupa României
