= 2002–03 Divizia D =

61st season of the Liga IV, the fourth tier of the Romanian football league

Liga IV
- Season: 2002–03

The 2002–03 Divizia D was the 61st season of the Liga IV, the fourth tier of the Romanian football league system. The champions of each county association promoted to Divizia C without promotion play-off.

== County leagues ==
- Alba (AB)
- Arad (AR)
- Argeș (AG)
- Bacău (BC)
- Bihor (BH)
- Bistrița-Năsăud (BN)
- Botoșani (BT)
- Brașov (BV)
- Brăila (BR)
- Bucharest (B)
- Buzău (BZ)
- Caraș-Severin (CS)
- Călărași (CL)
- Cluj (CJ)
- Constanța (CT)
- Covasna (CV)
- Dâmbovița (DB)
- Dolj (DJ)
- Galați (GL)
- Giurgiu (GR)
- Gorj (GJ)
- Harghita (HR)
- Hunedoara (HD)
- Ialomița (IL)
- Iași (IS)
- Ilfov (IF)
- Maramureș (MM)
- Mehedinți (MH)
- Mureș (MS)
- Neamț (NT)
- Olt (OT)
- Prahova (PH)
- Satu Mare (SM)
- Sălaj (SJ)
- Sibiu (SB)
- Suceava (SV)
- Teleorman (TR)
- Timiș (TM)
- Tulcea (TL)
- Vaslui (VS)
- Vâlcea (VL)
- Vrancea (VN)

=== Arad County ===
Pos	Team	Pld	W	D	L	GF	GA	GD	Pts	Promotion or relegation
1	Șiriana Șiria (C, P)	30	23	3	4	113	26	+87	72	Promotion to Divizia C
2	Victoria Nădlac	30	22	3	5	62	31	+31	69	
3	Olimpia Bârzava	30	20	5	5	78	32	+46	65	
4	Voința Macea	30	20	2	8	65	31	+34	62	
5	Comera Arad	30	18	6	6	84	39	+45	60	
6	Gloria Arad	30	15	3	12	76	48	+28	48	
7	Mureșul Zădăreni	30	12	7	11	45	47	−2	43	
8	Șoimii Pâncota	30	13	4	13	59	68	−9	43	
9	Crișul Chișineu-Criș	30	12	4	14	57	55	+2	40	
10	Armonia Ineu	30	12	3	15	67	57	+10	39	
11	Romvest Arad	30	10	4	16	59	63	−4	34	
12	Universitatea Vinga	30	9	4	17	38	62	−24	31	
13	Înfrățirea Iratoșu	30	9	1	20	40	72	−32	28	
14	UAV Telecom Arad II	30	7	6	17	46	74	−28	27	
15	Șoimii Lipova (R)	30	6	3	21	30	90	−60	21	Relegation to Arad County Championship
16	Crișana Sebiș (R)	30	3	0	27	25	148	−123	9	Relegation to Arad County Championship

Rules for classification: 1) Points; 2) Goal difference; 3) Number of goals scored.
(C) Champions; (P) Promoted; (R) Relegated

=== Bacău County ===
Pos	Team	Pld	W	D	L	GF	GA	GD	Pts	Promotion or relegation
1	Willy Bacău (C, P)	28	23	2	3	86	26	+60	71	Promotion to Divizia C
2	Petrom Zemeș	28	20	2	6	86	23	+63	62	
3	Comănești	28	17	3	8	72	31	+41	54	
4	Pambac Bacău	28	15	3	10	73	29	+44	48	
5	Subex Bacău	28	15	3	10	49	39	+10	48	
6	Aerostar Bacău II	28	11	5	12	49	46	+3	38	
7	Avântul Răcăciuni	28	11	5	12	48	47	+1	38	
8	Consart Bacău	28	12	2	14	54	64	−10	38	
9	Voința Podul Turcului	28	11	4	13	46	48	−2	37	
10	Recolta Ardeoani	28	10	5	13	55	75	−20	35	
11	Avântul Căiuți	28	11	1	16	19	89	−70	34	
12	Flamura Roșie Sascut	28	11	0	17	38	57	−19	33	
13	Oituz Târgu Ocna	28	9	3	16	41	59	−18	30	
14	Viitorul Tescani	28	8	3	17	43	95	−52	27	
15	Dofteana	28	7	1	20	38	99	−61	22	Relegation to Bacău County Championship
16	Zimbrul Caraclău (Note: Zimbrul Caraclău withdrew in the first part of the season and all its results were canceled.) (D)	0	0	0	0	0	0	0	0	Withdrew

Rules for classification: 1) Points; 2) Goal difference; 3) Number of goals scored.
(C) Champions; (D) Disqualified; (P) Promoted

=== Bihor County ===
Pos	Team	Pld	W	D	L	GF	GA	GD	Pts	Promotion or relegation
1	Minerul Ștei (C, P)	28	21	5	2	103	22	+81	68 (Note: Olimpia Salonta–Minerul Ștei 2–2; Minerul Ștei–Olimpia Salonta 2–2.)	Promotion to Divizia C after tie-breaker
2	Olimpia Salonta	28	21	5	2	102	27	+75	68	Qualification to tie-breaker
3	Tileagd	28	20	2	6	71	25	+46	62	
4	Beiuș	28	16	3	9	69	43	+26	51	
5	Crișul Aleșd	28	14	4	10	63	40	+23	46	
6	Lotus Băile Felix	28	15	7	6	65	26	+39	46 (Note: Lotus Băile Felix deducted 6 points.)	
7	Romtrans Oradea	28	14	3	11	38	32	+6	45	
8	Tricolorul Damore Alparea	28	11	5	12	44	50	−6	38	
9	Biharea Vașcău	28	10	5	13	35	52	−17	35	
10	Petrolul Suplac	28	10	3	15	49	55	−6	33	
11	Unirea Valea lui Mihai	28	8	3	17	48	72	−24	27	
12	Bihoreana Marghita	28	8	3	17	29	69	−40	27	
13	Crișana Tinca	28	6	6	16	39	71	−32	24	
14	Oțelul Ștei	28	7	0	21	47	92	−45	21	
15	Arcadia Vadu Crișului (R)	28	2	0	26	12	138	−126	6	Relegation to Bihor County Championship

Rules for classification: 1) Points; 2) Goal difference; 3) Number of goals scored.
(C) Champions; (P) Promoted; (R) Relegated
Notes:

Championship tie-breaker

Minerul Ștei and Olimpia Salonta played a play-off match in order to determine the winner of Divizia D Bihor. The match tie-breaker was played on 19 June 2003 at Municipal Stadium in Oradea.

Team 1	Score	Team 2
Minerul Ștei	2–1	Olimpia Salonta

=== Caraș-Severin County ===
Pos	Team	Pld	W	D	L	GF	GA	GD	Pts	Promotion or relegation
1	Caromet Caransebeș (C, P)	28	23	4	1	58	11	+47	73	Promotion to Divizia C
2	Gloria Reșița	28	19	5	4	76	27	+49	62	
3	Arsenal Reșița	28	18	5	5	60	34	+26	56 (Note: Arsenal Reșița deducted 3 points)	
4	Universitatea Reșița	28	17	2	9	66	36	+30	53	
5	Muncitorul Reșița	28	12	3	13	50	51	−1	39	
6	Foresta Zăvoi	28	11	3	14	50	58	−8	36	
7	Hercules Băile Herculane	28	10	4	14	43	50	−7	34	
8	Berzasca	28	9	7	12	42	48	−6	34	
9	Minerul Anina	28	9	7	12	41	38	+3	34	
10	Nera Bozovici	28	10	4	14	44	64	−20	34	
11	Timișul Slatina-Timiș	28	10	3	15	42	66	−24	33	
12	Metalul Bocșa	28	7	9	12	43	48	−5	30	
13	Oravița	28	8	5	15	36	52	−16	29	
14	Dunărea Moldova Nouă	28	8	2	18	38	70	−32	26	
15	Energia Reșița (R)	28	6	3	19	31	50	−19	21	Relegation to Caraș-Severin County Championship
16	CFR Caransebeș (Note: CFR Caransebeș withdrew in the first part of the season and all its results were canceled.) (D)	0	0	0	0	0	0	0	0	Withdrew

Rules for classification: 1) Points; 2) Goal difference; 3) Number of goals scored.
(C) Champions; (D) Disqualified; (P) Promoted; (R) Relegated

=== Covasna County ===
Series I

Pos	Team	Pld	W	D	L	GF	GA	GD	Pts	Qualification or relegation
1	Perkő Sânzieni (Q)	28	19	5	4	78	32	+46	62	Qualification to play-off
2	IAS Câmpu Frumos (Q)	28	17	4	7	62	41	+21	55	Qualification to play-off
3	Ojdula	28	16	6	6	60	33	+27	54	
4	KSE Târgu Secuiesc	28	13	4	11	78	38	+40	43	
5	Nemere Ghelința	28	10	1	17	56	67	−11	31	
6	Progresul Sita Buzăului	28	9	4	15	44	69	−25	31	
7	Moacșa	28	7	7	14	39	54	−15	28	
8	Avântul Catalina	28	4	3	21	35	118	−83	15	

Rules for classification: 1) Points; 2) Goal difference; 3) Number of goals scored.
(Q) Qualified for the phase indicated

Series II

Pos	Team	Pld	W	D	L	GF	GA	GD	Pts	Qualification or relegation
1	Ciucașul Întorsura Buzăului (Q)	32	21	6	5	87	31	+56	69	Qualification to play-off
2	Előre Tălișoara (Q)	32	19	5	8	77	28	+49	62	Qualification to play-off
3	Prima Brăduț	32	16	9	7	76	41	+35	57	
4	Stăruința Bodoc	32	15	9	8	65	44	+21	54	
5	Micfalău	32	13	2	17	57	82	−25	41	
6	Șoimii Baraolt	32	10	6	16	56	60	−4	36	
7	Avântul Ilieni	32	8	11	13	44	58	−14	35	
8	Victoria Ozun	32	10	5	17	50	72	−22	35	
9	Spartacus Hăghig	32	3	5	24	32	128	−96	14	

Rules for classification: 1) Points; 2) Goal difference; 3) Number of goals scored.
(Q) Qualified for the phase indicated

Championship play-off
Table

Pos	Team	Pld	W	D	L	GF	GA	GD	Pts	Promotion
1	Előre Tălișoara (C, P)	3	1	2	0	4	1	+3	5	Promotion to Divizia C
2	Ciucașul Întorsura Buzăului	3	1	2	0	1	0	+1	5	
3	IAS Câmpu Frumos	3	0	3	0	2	2	0	3	
4	Perkő Sânzieni	3	0	1	2	0	4	−4	1	

Rules for classification: 1) Points; 2) Goal difference; 3) Number of goals scored.
(C) Champions; (P) Promoted

Results

19 June 2003	IAS Câmpu Frumos	0–0	Ciucașul Întorsura Buzăului	Bodoc

19 June 2003	Perkő Sânzieni	0–3	Előre Tălișoara	Valea Crișului

22 June 2003	Előre Tălișoara	0–0	Ciucașul Întorsura Buzăului	Bodoc

22 June 2003	IAS Câmpu Frumos	1–1	Perkő Sânzieni	Valea Crișului

25 June 2003	Perkő Sânzieni	0–1	Ciucașul Întorsura Buzăului	Bodoc

25 June 2003	Előre Tălișoara	1–1	IAS Câmpu Frumos	Valea Crișului

=== Dolj County ===
Team changes from previous season.

Promoted to Divizia C

- None

Relegated from Divizia C

- None

Promoted from Dolj Elite Category

- Progresul Ciupercenii Vechi (Seria I winners)
- Tricolor Sadova (Seria II winners)
- Unirea Podari (Seria III winners)
- Progresul Segarcea (Play-off winners)

Relegated to Dolj Elite Category

- Recolta Măceșu de Jos
- MAT Segarcea (Dissolved)

Other changes

- Aquaterm Filiași was spared from relegation and was renamed as ASO Filiași.
- CFR Marfă Craiova was renamed as Știința CFR Craiova.
- Spicul Unirea and ȘF "Gică Popescu" Craiova admitted in the place of Autobuzul Leamna and Victoria Plenița.

Table

Pos	Team	Pld	W	D	L	GF	GA	GD	Pts	Promotion or relegation
1	Știința CFR Craiova (C, P)	34	32	0	2	122	18	+104	96 (Note: The match Chimia — Știința CFR Craiova 3–1, from the last round, was homologated 0–3.)	Promotion to Divizia C
2	Chimia Craiova	34	30	1	3	142	17	+125	91	
3	Mârșani	34	23	2	9	94	47	+47	71	
4	Unirea Podari	34	18	7	9	74	36	+38	61	
5	Victoria Călărași	34	19	3	12	81	50	+31	60	
6	Progresul Ciupercenii Vechi	34	16	4	14	59	63	−4	52	
7	Avântul Ișalnița	34	15	5	14	71	47	+24	50	
8	Unirea Tricolor Dăbuleni	34	15	4	15	60	66	−6	49	
9	ȘF "Gică Popescu" Craiova	34	14	7	13	59	65	−6	49	
10	Gaz Metan Pielești	34	13	7	14	53	56	−3	46	
11	Recolta Ostroveni	34	13	6	15	65	67	−2	45	
12	Tricolor Sadova	34	13	4	17	59	69	−10	43	
13	Progresul Băilești	34	13	3	18	60	86	−26	42	
14	Vânătorul Desa (O)	34	11	7	16	52	79	−27	40	Qualification to relegation play-out
15	Portul Bechet (O)	34	10	5	19	44	83	−39	35	Qualification to relegation play-out
16	Filiași (O)	34	7	6	21	48	90	−42	27	Qualification to relegation play-out
17	Progresul Segarcea (R)	34	4	4	26	33	117	−84	16	Relegation to Dolj Elite Category
18	Spicul Unirea (R)	34	2	1	31	29	146	−117	7	Relegation to Dolj Elite Category

Rules for classification: 1) Points; 2) Goal difference; 3) Number of goals scored.
(C) Champions; (O) Play-off winners; (P) Promoted; (R) Relegated
Notes:

Relegation play-out

The 14th, 15th and 16th-placed teams of the Divizia D faces the 2nd placed teams from the three series of Dolj Elite Category. The matches was played on 21 June 2003, at Craiova on Constructorul, Combinat and Armata Grounds.

Team 1	Score	Team 2
Vânătorul Desa	2–1 (a.e.t.)	Recolta Urzicuța
Portul Bechet	8–1	Fulgerul Mârșani
Filiași	2–1	Amaradia Melinești

=== Galați County ===
Pos	Team	Pld	W	D	L	GF	GA	GD	Pts	Promotion or relegation
1	Viitorul Costache Negri (C, P)	30	25	2	3	107	24	+83	77	Promotion to Divizia C
2	Sporting Tecuci	30	21	1	8	92	40	+52	64	
3	Sporting Șivița	30	20	3	7	100	39	+61	63	
4	Dunărea Galați II	30	19	1	10	106	45	+61	58	
5	Bujorii Târgu Bujor	30	18	3	9	58	42	+16	57	
6	Hidraulic Galați	30	16	4	10	67	35	+32	52	
7	Dueta Fântânele	30	14	3	13	42	56	−14	45	
8	Dunis Ivești	30	13	4	13	53	49	+4	43	
9	Voința Liești	30	12	5	13	46	60	−14	41	
10	Metalosport Galați	30	10	4	16	39	54	−15	34	
11	Voința Cudalbi	30	11	1	18	43	77	−34	34	
12	Viitorul Berești	30	9	6	15	38	67	−29	33	
13	Mălina Smârdan	30	10	2	18	54	87	−33	32	
14	Muncitorul Ghidigeni	30	10	1	19	47	71	−24	31	
15	Progresul Măstăcani	30	5	3	22	39	123	−84	18	
16	Dunărea Fantastic (Note: Dunărea Fantastic withdrew in the second part of the season and lost all remaining matches with 0–3.) (R)	30	5	1	24	21	83	−62	16	Relegation to Galați County Championship

Rules for classification: 1) Points; 2) Goal difference; 3) Number of goals scored.
(C) Champions; (P) Promoted; (R) Relegated

=== Giurgiu County ===
Pos	Team	Pld	W	D	L	GF	GA	GD	Pts	Qualification or relegation
1	CMGF Braniștea (C, P)	27	24	2	1	97	20	+77	74	Promotion to Divizia C
2	Real Hobaia	22	19	2	1	94	39	+55	58 (Note: Real Hobaia deducted 1 points.)	
3	Săgeata Brăniștari	27	18	3	6	84	31	+53	57	
4	Neajlovul Iepurești	27	16	1	10	68	52	+16	49	
5	AS Podul Doamnei	27	15	1	11	63	58	+5	46	
6	AS Tigar Giurgiu	28	15	2	11	67	39	+28	45 (Note: AS Tigar Giurgiu deducted 2 points.)	
7	Avântul Cartojani	27	14	2	11	69	44	+25	44	
8	Energia Remuș	27	14	2	11	49	51	−2	44	
9	Mihai Viteazu Călugăreni	27	11	3	13	44	58	−14	32 (Note: Mihai Viteazu Călugăreni deducted 4 points.)	
10	Comerțul Greaca	27	10	1	16	45	66	−21	28 (Note: Comerțul Greaca deducted 3 points.)	
11	Voința Grădiștea	28	9	4	15	38	53	−15	30 (Note: Voința Grădiștea deducted 1 points.)	
12	Petrolul Roata de Jos	26	7	2	17	48	93	−45	20 (Note: Petrolul Roata de Jos deducted 3 points.)	
13	Aristar Gostinu	0	0	0	0	0	0	0	0	
14	Petrolul Corbii Mari	0	0	0	0	0	0	0	0	
15	Argeșul Grădinari	0	0	0	0	0	0	0	0	
16	AC Malu Spart	0	0	0	0	0	0	0	0	
17	Luceafărul Trestieni	0	0	0	0	0	0	0	0	
18	AS Kapay Bolintin Deal	0	0	0	0	0	0	0	0	

Rules for classification: 1) Points; 2) Goal difference; 3) Number of goals scored.
(C) Champions; (P) Promoted

=== Maramureș County ===
North Series

Pos	Team	Pld	W	D	L	GF	GA	GD	Pts	Qualification or relegation (Note: After 16 matches, the best four teams qualify for series play-off.)
1	Kosziszbur Ocna Șugatag	22	16	5	1	76	32	+44	53	Qualification to championship final
2	Iza Dragomirești	22	13	1	8	76	50	+26	40	
3	Minerul Cavnic	22	10	5	7	53	40	+13	35	
4	Speranța Vișeu de Jos	22	9	2	11	43	42	+1	29	
5	Bradul Vișeu de Sus	16	7	4	5	44	31	+13	25	
6	Zorile Moisei	16	5	5	6	37	43	−6	20	
7	Minerul Borșa	16	6	1	9	29	41	−12	19	
8	Marmația Sighetu Marmației II	16	5	1	10	26	48	−22	16	
9	CSȘ Sighetu Marmației	16	1	0	15	19	72	−53	3	

Notes:

South Series

Pos	Team	Pld	W	D	L	GF	GA	GD	Pts	Qualification or relegation
1	Gloria Renel Baia Mare (Q)	22	16	4	2	68	15	+53	52	Qualification to championship final
2	Minerul Băiuț	22	16	4	2	51	10	+41	52	
3	Spicul Ardusat	22	14	1	7	61	30	+31	43	
4	Independența Baia Mare	22	14	1	7	39	36	+3	43	
5	Minerul Băița	22	12	4	6	61	28	+33	40	
6	Lăpușul Târgu Lăpuș	22	9	4	9	32	33	−1	31	
7	Moeller Fărcașa	22	8	4	10	37	45	−8	28	
8	Viorel Mateianu Baia Mare	22	8	2	12	31	36	−5	26	
9	Phoenix Baia Mare	22	8	0	14	36	49	−13	24	
10	Sporting Baia Mare	22	8	0	14	30	44	−14	24	
11	Progresul Șomcuta Mare	22	4	1	17	36	78	−42	13	
12	GSC Baia Mare	22	0	1	21	11	89	−78	1	

(Q) Qualified for the phase indicated

Championship final

The championship final was played at Dealul Florilor Stadium in Baia Mare.

Team 1	Score	Team 2
Gloria Renel Baia Mare	3–2	Kosziszbur Ocna Șugatag

Gloria Renel Baia Mare won the Liga IV Maramureș County and promoted to Divizia C.

=== Mureș County ===
Pos	Team	Pld	W	D	L	GF	GA	GD	Pts	Qualification or relegation
1	Lacul Ursu Mobila Sovata (Q)	20	13	5	2	49	15	+34	44	Qualification to play-off
2	Mureșul Romvelo Luduș (Q)	20	13	3	4	49	11	+38	42	Qualification to play-off
3	Dealu Mare Sighișoara (Q)	20	11	6	3	46	19	+27	39	Qualification to play-off
4	Gliga Companies Reghin (Q)	20	11	3	6	37	17	+20	36	Qualification to play-off
5	Mureșul Târgu Mureș (Q)	20	10	5	5	27	18	+9	35	Qualification to play-off
6	Trans-Sil Sântana de Mureș	20	9	4	7	30	20	+10	31	
7	Iernut	20	9	2	9	20	32	−12	29	
8	Târnava Mică Sângeorgiu de Pădure	20	7	3	10	28	30	−2	24	
9	Avântul Miheșu de Câmpie	20	7	1	12	32	44	−12	22	
10	Dalia Reghin	20	2	1	17	13	59	−46	7	
11	Mureșul Chirileu	20	2	0	18	16	82	−66	6	

Rules for classification: 1) Points; 2) Goal difference; 3) Number of goals scored.
(Q) Qualified for the phase indicated

Championship play-off

Pos	Team	Pld	W	D	L	GF	GA	GD	Pts	Promotion
1	Lacul Ursu Mobila Sovata (C, P)	16	13	3	0	38	7	+31	42	Promotion to Divizia C
2	Mureșul Romvelo Luduș	16	8	2	6	33	20	+13	26	
3	Dealu Mare Sighișoara	16	5	3	8	25	34	−9	18	
4	Gliga Companies Reghin	16	5	2	9	20	21	−1	17	
5	Mureșul Târgu Mureș	16	3	2	11	11	45	−34	11	

Rules for classification: 1) Points; 2) Goal difference; 3) Number of goals scored.
(C) Champions; (P) Promoted

=== Neamț County ===
Seria I

Pos	Team	Pld	W	D	L	GF	GA	GD	Pts	Qualification or relegation
1	Biruința Negrești (Q)	28	21	3	4	99	33	+66	66	Qualification to final
2	Vulturul Zănești	28	20	3	5	91	32	+59	63	
3	Unirea Negrești	28	17	2	9	77	46	+31	53	
4	Viitorul Podoleni	28	16	1	11	80	46	+34	49	
5	Bradul Roznov	28	13	3	12	80	46	+34	42	
6	Inter Gârcina	28	8	3	17	47	98	−51	27	
7	Gloria Ștefan cel Mare	28	4	2	22	35	124	−89	14	
8	Voința Rediu	28	3	3	22	34	118	−84	12	

Rules for classification: 1) Points; 2) Goal difference; 3) Number of goals scored.
(Q) Qualified for the phase indicated

Series II

Pos	Team	Pld	W	D	L	GF	GA	GD	Pts	Qualification or relegation
1	Laminorul Roman II (Q)	28	23	3	2	112	29	+83	72	Qualification to final
2	Biruința Gherăiești	28	17	1	10	82	60	+22	52	
3	Spicul Tămășeni	28	14	4	10	81	66	+15	46	
4	Zimbrul Pâncești	28	13	4	11	66	82	−16	43	
5	Speranța Răucești	28	13	3	12	76	72	+4	42	
6	Grumăzești	28	9	5	14	59	58	+1	32	
7	Lorisim Făurei	28	5	5	18	38	86	−48	20	
8	Franceska Răchiteni	28	3	5	20	49	110	−61	14	

Rules for classification: 1) Points; 2) Goal difference; 3) Number of goals scored.
(Q) Qualified for the phase indicated

Championship final

Team 1	Agg.	Team 2	1st leg	2nd leg
Biruința Negrești	1–8	Laminorul Roman II	1–5	0–3

Laminorul Roman II won Divizia D Neamț and promoted to Divizia C.

=== Timiș County ===
Pos	Team	Pld	W	D	L	GF	GA	GD	Pts	Promotion
1	CFR Timișoara (C, P)	30	22	6	2	104	21	+83	72	Promotion to Divizia C
2	Furnirul Deta	30	20	3	7	81	40	+41	63	
3	Calor Timișoara	30	18	8	4	64	31	+33	62	
4	Textila Timișoara	30	19	3	8	77	42	+35	60	
5	Jimbolia	30	18	5	7	74	29	+45	59	
6	Auto UMT Timișoara	30	18	5	7	69	27	+42	59	
7	Unirea Banloc	30	14	8	8	45	47	−2	50	
8	Telecom Timișul Șag	30	12	5	13	49	47	+2	41	
9	Unirea Sânnicolau Mare	30	11	7	12	48	65	−17	40	
10	Bega Belinț	30	10	9	11	57	53	+4	39	
11	Comprest Lugoj	30	11	5	14	51	48	+3	38	
12	Frola Sânandrei (Note: Frola Sânandrei started the championship as Frola Bancom Comloșu Mare, but was moved and renamed before the start of the second part.)	30	8	5	17	25	54	−29	29	
13	Plavii Delia Sânpetru Mare	30	5	5	20	32	68	−36	20	
14	Voința 2000 Timișoara	30	6	2	22	34	85	−51	20	
15	Tipomic Timișoara (R)	30	3	5	22	34	96	−62	14	Relegation to Timiș County Championship
16	Spartak Gottlob (R)	30	2	5	23	33	119	−86	11	Relegation to Timiș County Championship

Rules for classification: 1) Points; 2) Goal difference; 3) Number of goals scored.
(C) Champions; (P) Promoted; (R) Relegated

== See also ==
- 2002–03 Divizia A
- 2002–03 Divizia B
- 2002–03 Divizia C
- 2002–03 Cupa României
