= 2003–04 Divizia C =

Third tier Romanian football league

Divizia C
- Season: 2003–04

The 2003–04 Divizia C was the 48th season of Liga III, the third tier of the Romanian football league system.

== Team changes ==
=== To Divizia C ===
Relegated from Divizia B

- Foresta Fălticeni
- UM Timișoara

Promoted from Divizia D

- Laminorul Roman II
- Șoimii Suceava
- Victoria Muntenii de Jos
- Dinamo Tulcea
- UZTEL Ploiești
- Willy Bacău
- Mondial Brăila
- Aurora 23 August
- Constructorul Braniștea
- Mogoșoaia
- Ghimbav 2000
- Electrosid Titu
- Lăpușata
- Știința CFR Craiova
- Olt Scornicești
- Juventus Bascov
- Minerul Mehedinți Valea Copcii
- Minerul Rovinari
- Caromet Caransebeș
- CFR Timișoara
- Hârtia Petrești
- Minerul Bărbăteni
- Șiriana Șiria
- Minerul Ștei
- Gloria Renel Baia Mare
- Minerul Turț
- Mobila Șimleu Silvaniei
- Minerul Bălan
- Lacul Ursu Mobila Sovata
- Minerul Iara
- Universitatea Sopo Sibiu

=== From Divizia C ===
Promoted to Divizia B

- Petrolul Moinești
- Laminorul Roman
- Vaslui
- Unirea Urziceni
- Poiana Câmpina
- Juventus București
- Electrica Constanța
- Callatis Mangalia
- Dacia Mioveni
- Chindia Târgoviște
- Rarora Râmnicu Vâlcea
- Minerul Motru
- Building Vânju Mare
- Jiul Petroșani
- Certej
- ACU Arad
- Oltul Sfântu Gheorghe
- Precizia Săcele
- Armătura Zalău
- Tricotaje Ineu
- Oașul Negrești-Oaș

Relegated to Divizia D

- Unirea Negrești
- Proodeftiki Adjud
- Voluntari
- Ambianța Slobozia
- Voința București
- Venus RGAB București
- Șantierul Naval Tulcea
- Petrolul Drăgășani
- Fulgerul Lerești
- Forestierul Stâlpeni
- Metalul Oțelu Roșu
- Electrica Timișoara
- Minerul Uricani
- Rapid CFR Teiuș
- Energia Feldioara
- Textila Cisnădie
- Petrom Marghita
- Plastunion Satulung
- Marmația Sighetu Marmației

=== Other changes ===
- Bucovina Suceava and Gilortul Târgu Cărbunești withdrew during the previous second division season and were dissolved.
- Mobila Iași ceded its place to FCM Huși.
- Előre Tălișoara ceded its place to Forex Brașov.
- Foraj Videle ceded its place to Prodchim Balș.
- Viticola Dumitra ceded its place to Gloria Bistrița II.
- AMSO Sibiu ceded its place to FC Sibiu.
- Mureșul Deva merged with second division team CS Certej, the new entity being named CS Deva.
- Unirea Sânnicolau Mare took over the place of Mureșul Deva.
- Rafinăria Dărmănești, Turistul Pietroasa Haleș, Recolta Gheorghe Lazăr, Viitorul Costache Negri, Lacul Sulița, Metalcord Buzău, Spic de Grâu București, Avântul Dor Mărunt and Daiana Odobești sold their places.
- Dinamo București II, Politehnica Timișoara, Inter Blaj, Kozara Vințu de Jos bought places.
- Bucovina Rădăuți, Metalul Băicoi, Faur București, ROVA Roșiori, Curtea de Argeș, Minerul Berbești, ASA Târgu Mureș were spared from relegation.
- Dunărea Calafat returned to its original name after the partnership with Școala de Fotbal "Gică Popescu" ended.

== League tables ==
=== Seria I ===
Pos	Team	Pld	W	D	L	GF	GA	GD	Pts	Qualification or relegation
1	Botoșani (C, P)	24	20	3	1	59	6	+53	63	Promotion to Divizia B
2	Bacău II	24	20	2	2	58	9	+49	62	
3	CFR Moldova Iași	24	12	1	11	31	24	+7	37	
4	CFR Pașcani	24	11	4	9	27	32	−5	37	
5	Ceahlăul Piatra Neamț II	24	10	6	8	30	26	+4	36	
6	Rulmentul Bârlad	24	11	1	12	32	41	−9	34	
7	Șoimii Suceava	24	10	2	12	26	40	−14	32	
8	Huși	24	10	2	12	33	28	+5	32	
9	Cimentul Bicaz	24	9	5	10	25	31	−6	32	
10	Victoria Muntenii de Jos (R)	24	9	2	13	24	35	−11	29	Relegation to Divizia D
11	Viitorul Hârlău (R)	24	8	1	15	27	32	−5	25	Relegation to Divizia D
12	Bucovina Rădăuți (R)	24	5	3	16	28	47	−19	18	Relegation to Divizia D
13	Laminorul Roman II (R)	24	3	4	17	17	60	−43	13	Relegation to Divizia D
14	Foresta Fălticeni (Note: Foresta Falticeni was excluded after 2 rounds for two no shows.) (D)	0	0	0	0	0	0	0	0	Withdrew

Source: romaniansoccer.ro
Rules for classification: 1) Points; 2) Goal difference; 3) Number of goals scored.
(C) Champions; (D) Disqualified; (P) Promoted; (R) Relegated

=== Seria II ===
Pos	Team	Pld	W	D	L	GF	GA	GD	Pts	Qualification or relegation
1	Dunărea Galați (C, P)	26	20	2	4	54	16	+38	62	Promotion to Divizia B
2	Petrolistul Boldești	26	16	6	4	49	17	+32	54	
3	Aerostar Bacău	26	16	2	8	51	28	+23	50	
4	Olimpia Râmnicu Sărat	26	13	7	6	33	24	+9	46	
5	Petrolul Brăila	26	14	3	9	48	27	+21	45	
6	Chimia Brazi	26	13	6	7	44	23	+21	45	
7	Conpet Ploiești	26	12	6	8	44	30	+14	42	
8	Petrolul Berca	26	11	5	10	49	36	+13	38	
9	Faur București	25	8	5	12	37	42	−5	29	
10	Dinamo Tulcea (R)	26	8	4	14	31	55	−24	28	Relegation to Divizia D
11	UZTEL Ploiești (R)	26	7	4	15	32	43	−11	25	Relegation to Divizia D
12	Willy Bacău (R)	25	6	5	14	27	47	−20	23	Relegation to Divizia D
13	Mondial Brăila (R)	26	5	3	18	22	61	−39	18	Relegation to Divizia D
14	Metalul Băicoi (Note: Metalul Baicoi withdrew after 14 rounds and lost all remaining matches with 0–3.) (R)	26	1	4	21	14	86	−72	7	Relegation to Divizia D

Source: romaniansoccer.ro
Rules for classification: 1) Points; 2) Goal difference; 3) Number of goals scored.
(C) Champions; (P) Promoted; (R) Relegated

=== Seria III ===
Pos	Team	Pld	W	D	L	GF	GA	GD	Pts	Qualification or relegation
1	Otopeni (C, P)	24	17	4	3	52	19	+33	55	Promotion to Divizia B
2	Dunărea Giurgiu	24	14	3	7	49	29	+20	45	
3	Portul Constanța	24	12	4	8	44	29	+15	40	
4	Dinamo București II	24	10	6	8	42	32	+10	36	
5	Mogoșoaia	24	10	4	10	36	31	+5	34	
6	Aversa București	24	8	9	7	35	36	−1	33	
7	ROVA Roșiori	24	9	5	10	31	35	−4	32	
8	Dunărea Călărași	24	8	7	9	35	36	−1	31	
9	Aurora 23 August	24	9	4	11	37	41	−4	31	
10	Oil Terminal Constanța (R)	24	8	6	10	25	40	−15	32 (Note: Oil Terminal Constanța deducted 2 points.)	Relegation to Divizia D
11	Petrolul Bolintin-Vale (R)	24	9	2	13	42	51	−9	29	Relegation to Divizia D
12	Snagov (R)	24	5	8	11	30	41	−11	23	Relegation to Divizia D
13	Sportul Ciorogârla (R)	24	4	4	16	31	69	−38	16	Relegation to Divizia D
14	Constructorul Braniștea (Note: Constructorul Braniștea withdrew after 6 rounds and all its results were canceled.) (D)	0	0	0	0	0	0	0	0	Withdrew

Source: romaniansoccer.ro
Rules for classification: 1) Points; 2) Goal difference; 3) Number of goals scored.
(C) Champions; (D) Disqualified; (P) Promoted; (R) Relegated

=== Seria IV ===
Pos	Team	Pld	W	D	L	GF	GA	GD	Pts	Qualification or relegation
1	Ghimbav 2000 (C, P)	26	16	7	3	52	17	+35	55	Promotion to Divizia B
2	Alpan U Târgoviște	26	16	3	7	41	21	+20	51	
3	Predeal	26	13	7	6	33	18	+15	46	
4	Tractorul Brașov	26	12	5	9	39	27	+12	41	
5	Romradiatoare Brașov	26	12	3	11	39	33	+6	39	
6	Electrosid Titu	26	11	5	10	42	32	+10	38	
7	Petrolul Steaua Târgoviște	26	10	7	9	35	29	+6	37	
8	Nitramonia Făgăraș	26	10	7	9	32	38	−6	37	
9	Tricolorul Breaza	26	11	3	12	31	30	+1	36	
10	Flacăra Moreni	26	10	5	11	30	39	−9	35	
11	Viromet Victoria (R)	26	9	7	10	29	32	−3	34	Relegation to Divizia D
12	Forex Brașov (R)	26	9	3	14	20	28	−8	30	Relegation to Divizia D
13	Curtea de Argeș (R)	26	5	4	17	18	54	−36	19	Relegation to Divizia D
14	Torpedo Zărnești (R)	26	4	2	20	15	58	−43	14	Relegation to Divizia D

Source: romaniansoccer.ro
Rules for classification: 1) Points; 2) Goal difference; 3) Number of goals scored.
(C) Champions; (P) Promoted; (R) Relegated

=== Seria V ===
Pos	Team	Pld	W	D	L	GF	GA	GD	Pts	Qualification or relegation
1	Oltul Slatina (C, P)	26	17	6	3	43	17	+26	57	Promotion to Divizia B
2	Armata Craiova	26	15	4	7	41	25	+16	49	
3	Progresul Caracal	26	14	4	8	44	20	+24	46	
4	Turris Turnu Măgurele	26	12	5	9	31	29	+2	41	
5	Oltchim Râmnicu Vâlcea	26	12	3	11	33	26	+7	39	
6	Electro Craiova	26	11	2	13	26	36	−10	35	
7	Știința CFR Craiova	26	10	4	12	34	33	+1	34	
8	Dunărea Zimnicea	26	9	7	10	24	31	−7	34	
9	Olt Scornicești	26	9	7	10	29	34	−5	34	
10	Prodchim Balș	26	9	6	11	30	29	+1	33	
11	Lăpușata (R)	26	9	5	12	31	31	0	32	Relegation to Divizia D
12	Petrolul Videle (R)	26	9	4	13	37	43	−6	31	Relegation to Divizia D
13	Dunărea Calafat (R)	26	9	4	13	32	45	−13	31	Relegation to Divizia D
14	Juventus Bascov (R)	26	5	3	18	29	65	−36	18	Relegation to Divizia D

Source: romaniansoccer.ro
Rules for classification: 1) Points; 2) Goal difference; 3) Number of goals scored.
(C) Champions; (P) Promoted; (R) Relegated

=== Seria VI ===
Pos	Team	Pld	W	D	L	GF	GA	GD	Pts	Qualification or relegation
1	Politehnica Timișoara (C, P)	24	16	1	7	43	24	+19	49	Promotion to Divizia B
2	Minerul Moldova Nouă	24	14	4	6	43	21	+22	46	
3	Petrolul Stoina	24	14	1	9	52	39	+13	43	
4	Minerul Mătăsari	24	14	1	9	33	27	+6	43	
5	Minerul Mehedinți	24	11	4	9	33	26	+7	37	
6	Minerul Rovinari	24	11	3	10	25	21	+4	36	
7	Senaco Novaci	24	11	2	11	34	30	+4	35	
8	Vulcan	24	9	5	10	32	32	0	32	
9	Severnav Drobeta-Turnu Severin	24	10	1	13	32	36	−4	31	
10	Petrolul Țicleni	24	8	5	11	26	41	−15	29	
11	Inter Petrila (R)	24	8	3	13	32	38	−6	27	Relegation to Divizia D
12	Dierna Orșova (R)	24	7	5	12	24	39	−15	26	Relegation to Divizia D
13	Caromet Caransebeș (R)	24	3	5	16	21	56	−35	14	Relegation to Divizia D
14	Minerul Berbești (Note: Minerul Berbești withdrew after 7 rounds and all its results were canceled.) (D)	0	0	0	0	0	0	0	0	Withdrew

Source: romaniansoccer.ro
Rules for classification: 1) Points; 2) Goal difference; 3) Number of goals scored.
(C) Champions; (D) Disqualified; (P) Promoted; (R) Relegated

=== Seria VII ===
Pos	Team	Pld	W	D	L	GF	GA	GD	Pts	Qualification or relegation
1	Unirea Sânnicolau Mare (C, P)	26	16	6	4	37	22	+15	54	Promotion to Divizia B
2	Cugir 1939	26	15	8	3	43	18	+25	53	
3	Minerul Lupeni	26	17	2	7	57	26	+31	53	
4	Inter Blaj	26	16	5	5	44	19	+25	53	
5	CFR Timișoara	26	10	8	8	37	28	+9	38	
6	Aurul Brad	26	11	4	11	36	37	−1	37	
7	Soda Ocna Mureș	26	10	6	10	43	35	+8	36	
8	Kozara Vințu de Jos	26	9	6	11	26	30	−4	33	
9	UM Timișoara	26	16	3	7	42	22	+20	32 (Note: UM Timișoara deducted 19 points.)	
10	Hârtia Petrești	26	9	3	14	27	37	−10	30	
11	CFR Marmosim Simeria (R)	26	7	5	14	28	39	−11	26	Relegation to Divizia D
12	Dacia Orăștie (R)	26	5	2	19	30	67	−37	17	Relegation to Divizia D
13	Minerul Bărbăteni (R)	26	4	5	17	22	52	−30	17	Relegation to Divizia D
14	Cuprirom Abrud (R)	26	4	3	19	19	59	−40	15	Relegation to Divizia D

Source: romaniansoccer.ro
Rules for classification: 1) Points; 2) Goal difference; 3) Number of goals scored.
(C) Champions; (P) Promoted; (R) Relegated

=== Seria VIII ===
Pos	Team	Pld	W	D	L	GF	GA	GD	Pts	Qualification or relegation
1	Unirea Dej (C, P)	26	21	2	3	53	14	+39	65	Promotion to Divizia B
2	Frontiera Curtici	26	17	4	5	54	20	+34	55	
3	Someșul Satu Mare	26	15	1	10	51	37	+14	46	
4	Olimpia Gherla	26	13	3	10	43	30	+13	42	
5	Minerul Sărmășag	26	12	5	9	36	36	0	41	
6	Minerul Ștei	26	11	5	10	38	33	+5	38	
7	Victoria Carei	26	12	2	12	37	30	+7	38	
8	West Petrom Pecica	26	9	9	8	35	30	+5	36	
9	Telecom Arad	26	11	1	14	49	47	+2	34	
10	Gloria Renel Baia Mare	26	10	2	14	31	59	−28	32	
11	Șiriana Șiria (R)	26	9	3	14	34	50	−16	30	Relegation to Divizia D
12	Minerul Turț (R)	26	8	4	14	27	50	−23	28	Relegation to Divizia D
13	Dej (R)	26	7	5	14	29	40	−11	26	Relegation to Divizia D
14	Mobila Șimleu Silvaniei (R)	26	2	4	20	27	68	−41	10	Relegation to Divizia D

Source: romaniansoccer.ro
Rules for classification: 1) Points; 2) Goal difference; 3) Number of goals scored.
(C) Champions; (P) Promoted; (R) Relegated

=== Seria IX ===
Pos	Team	Pld	W	D	L	GF	GA	GD	Pts	Qualification or relegation
1	Sibiu (C, P)	26	21	4	1	52	11	+41	67	Promotion to Divizia B
2	Unirea Ungheni	26	12	4	10	36	25	+11	40	
3	Gaz Metan Târgu Mureș	26	12	3	11	41	35	+6	39	
4	Avântul Silva Reghin	26	11	5	10	26	26	0	38	
5	Someș Gaz Beclean	26	11	4	11	39	45	−6	37	
6	Arieșul Turda	26	10	6	10	34	31	+3	36	
7	Chimica Târnăveni	26	10	6	10	34	31	+3	36	
8	ASA Târgu Mureș	26	11	3	12	38	40	−2	36	
9	Lacul Ursu Mobila Sovata	26	10	5	11	26	37	−11	35	
10	Minerul Bălan	26	9	7	10	27	36	−9	34	
11	Gloria Bistrița II (R)	26	8	7	11	40	41	−1	31	Relegation to Divizia D
12	Minerul Iara (R)	26	8	7	11	27	29	−2	31	Relegation to Divizia D
13	Budvar Odorheiul Secuiesc (R)	26	8	5	13	29	42	−13	29	Relegation to Divizia D
14	Universitatea Sopo Sibiu (R)	26	6	4	16	24	44	−20	22	Relegation to Divizia D

Source: romaniansoccer.ro
Rules for classification: 1) Points; 2) Goal difference; 3) Number of goals scored.
(C) Champions; (P) Promoted; (R) Relegated

== See also ==
- 2003–04 Divizia A
- 2003–04 Divizia B
- 2003–04 Divizia D
- 2003–04 Cupa României
