= 1987–88 Cupa României =

Tournament details
- Country: Romania

Final positions
- Champions: Steaua București (renounced the trophy)
- Runners-up: Dinamo București

The 1987–88 Cupa României was the 50th edition of Romania's most prestigious football cup competition.

The title was won by Steaua București against Dinamo București.

== Format ==
The competition is an annual knockout tournament.

First round proper matches are played on the ground of the lowest ranked team, then from the second round proper the matches are played on a neutral location.

If a match is drawn after 90 minutes, the game goes in extra time, if the scored is still tight after 120 minutes, then the winner will be established at penalty kicks.

From the first edition, the teams from Divizia A entered in competition in sixteen finals, rule which remained till today.

== First round proper ==
Team 1	Score	Team 2
27 February 1988
Maramureş Baia Mare (Div. B)	3–0	(Div. A) FC Politehnica Timișoara
Voinţa București (Div. D)	0–3	(Div. A) Steaua București
28 February 1988
Granitul Babadag (Div. D)	1–2	(Div. A) Argeş Piteşti
Partizanul Bacău (Div. C)	1–2	(Div. A) Olt Scornicești
Gloria Bistrița (Div. B)	2–3	(Div. A) Victoria București
Progresul Brăila (Div. B)	5–1	(Div. A) CSM Suceava
Rapid București (Div. A)	1–0	(Div. A) ASA 1962 Târgu Mureș
Oţelul Dr. Petru Groza (Div. C)	1–2	(Div. A) Universitatea Craiova
CFR Paşcani (Div. B)	2–2 (a.e.t.)(3–2 p)	(Div. A) Flacăra Moreni
Petrolul Ploiești (Div. A)	1–1 (a.e.t.)(4–2 p)	(Div. A) Oțelul Galați
CSM Reșița (Div. B)	3–1	(Div. A) FCM Brașov
Olimpia Satu Mare (Div. B)	2–0	(Div. A) Universitatea Cluj
Montana Sinaia (Div. C)	1–2	(Div. A) Dinamo București
Pandurii Târgu Jiu (Div. B)	0–1	(Div. A) SC Bacău
Unirea Urziceni (Div. C)	1–3	(Div. A) Corvinul Hunedoara
9 March 1988
Carpaţi Agnita (Div. D)	0–1	(Div. A) Sportul Studenţesc București

== Second round proper ==
Team 1	Score	Team 2
10 April 1988
Maramureş Baia Mare	1–3	Steaua București
4 May 1988
Universitatea Craiova	2–1	SC Bacău
CFR Paşcani	2–1 (a.e.t.)	Olt Scornicești
Dinamo București	4–1	Progresul Brăila
Corvinul Hunedoara	2–1 (a.e.t.)	Petrolul Ploiești
Sportul Studenţesc București	3–2 (a.e.t.)	Olimpia Satu Mare
Rapid București	0–0 (a.e.t.)(5–4 p)	Argeş Piteşti
Victoria București	2–0	CSM Reșița

== Quarter-finals ==
Team 1	Score	Team 2
5 June 1988
Dinamo București	4–2	Corvinul Hunedoara
Sportul Studenţesc București	2–0	Rapid București
Steaua București	2–1	Universitatea Craiova
Victoria București	2–0	CFR Paşcani

== Semi-finals ==
Team 1	Score	Team 2
15 June 1988
Dinamo București	4–2	Victoria București
Steaua București	3–1	Sportul Studenţesc București

== Final ==
26 June 1988
19:00 EET

Steaua București	2–1	Dinamo București
Lăcătuș 27'; Balint 90'	Report	Răducioiu 87'

23 August, Bucharest
Attendance: 45,000
Referee: Radu Petrescu (Brașov)
