= CSM Pașcani =

Romanian football club

- Full name: Clubul Sportiv Municipal Pașcani
- Nicknames: Pășcănenii (The Pașcani People)
- Short name: Pașcani
- Founded: 1921; 105 years ago as CFR Pașcani
- Ground: CFR
- Capacity: 4,000
- Owner: Pașcani Municipality
- Chairman: Bogdan Mandric
- Head coach: Răzvan Boroeanu
- League: Liga III
- 2025–26: Liga IV, Iași County, 1st (promoted via play-offs)
- Website: http://www.csmpascani.ro/
Home colours	Away colours

Clubul Sportiv Municipal Pașcani, commonly known as CSM Pașcani or simply Pașcani, is a Romanian football team based in Pașcani, Iași County, currently competing in Liga III, the third tier of the Romanian football league system. The club has played twenty-five seasons in Romania's second division between 1934 and 1990.

The team is the men's football section of the multi-sport club CSM Pașcani, which also fields teams in handball, rugby, athletics, basketball, volleyball, tennis, and chess. Its most notable achievements include a 4th-place finish in the 1962–63 season of Divizia B and reaching the quarter-finals of the 1987–88 Cupa României. In 2026, Pașcani returned to Liga III after winning the Iași County championship and defeating Cimentul Bicaz 6–3 on aggregate in the promotion play-off.

== History ==
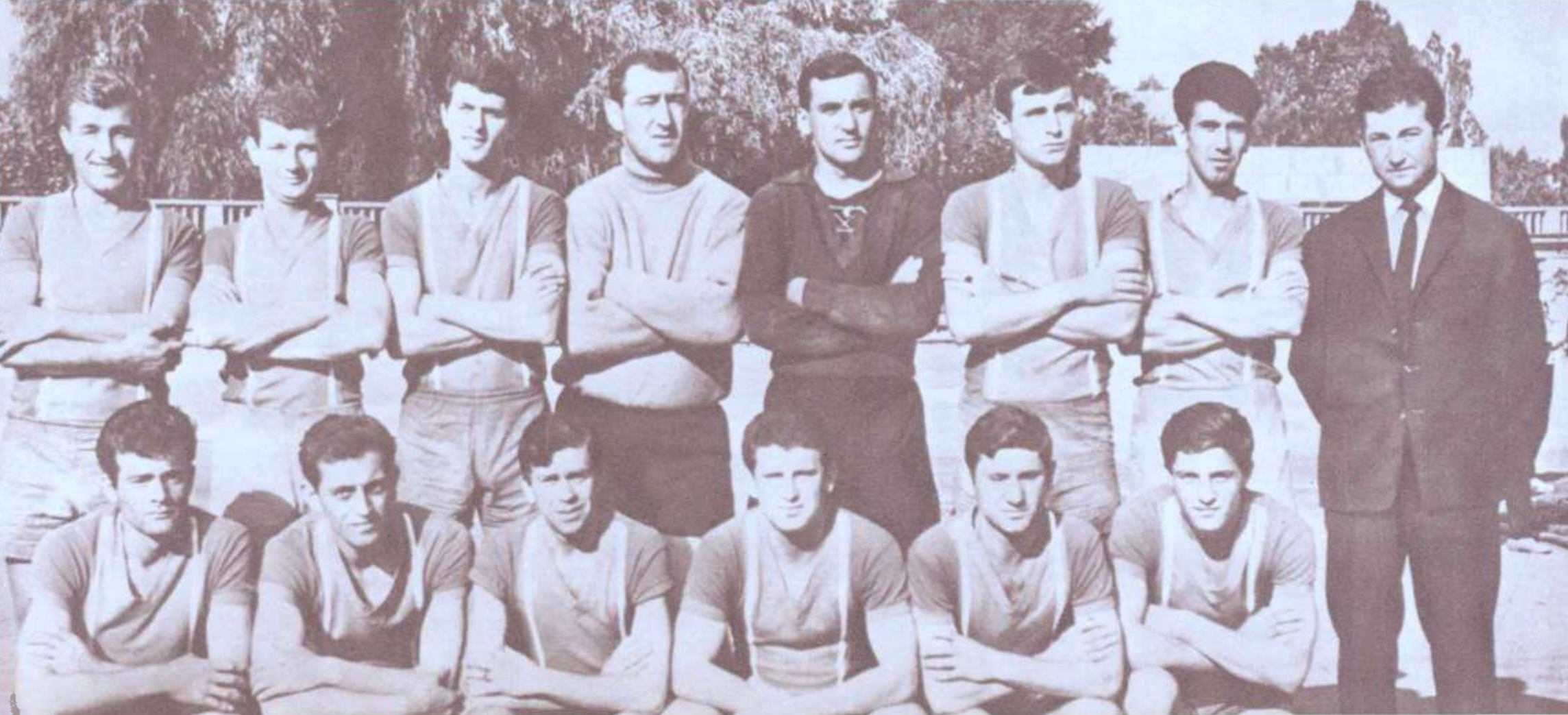
CFR Pașcani in the 1966–67 season.

The team was founded in 1921 as CFR Pașcani by workers from the local railway carriage repair workshops and initially competed in district and regional championships. In 1930, the team changed its name to Unirea CFR Pașcani and became part of Căminul Cultural CFR Unirea, a social and cultural society that aimed to continue, on a new basis, the activities of the old Unirea reading club, founded in Pașcani in 1872. The team competed for the first time at national level in the 1934–35 season of Divizia B and later in the 1937–38 season of Divizia C, before being renamed again as CFR Pașcani in 1948.

The team adopted the name Locomotiva Pașcani in the early 1950s. In the 1956 season, Locomotiva finished 2nd in Series I of Divizia C, just one point behind Recolta Fălticeni, narrowly missing promotion to Divizia B, and ranked 4th in the 1957–58 season. In 1958, the club reverted to its original name, CFR Pașcani, and made up for the previous disappointment by winning the 1958–59 Divizia C under coach Gheorghe Bărbulescu. The squad included Cristescu, Panaite, I. Nedelcu, Brohanschi, Simina, Boboc, Andrieș, Rozolea, Atanasiu, Burcă, and Vornicu.

CFR then spent ten consecutive seasons in Series I of Divizia B, ranking 10th in 1959–60, 5th in 1960–61, and 12th in 1961–62. Under Marin Alexandru, who coached the team for the following four years, CFR achieved its best result of the decade with a 4th-place finish in the 1962–63 season, followed by 6th in 1963–64, 9th in 1964–65, and 11th in 1965–66. In the 1966–67 season, the team was coached by Virgil Rizea, finishing 11th, and then ranked 9th in 1967–68 before being relegated at the end of the 1968–69 season after finishing 15th.

CFR returned to Divizia B just one year later under the leadership of Marin Alexandru, after winning Series I of Divizia C and finishing 2nd in Promotion Group I held in Brașov, behind SN Oltenița and ahead of Metalul Plopeni and Autobuzul București. The squad included Catrina, Mocanu, Mag, Cosma, Rusu, Rîșniță, Drăgan, Fătu, Vochin, Dominte, Blejușcă, Rozorea, Ciupa, Bunea, Munteanu, Artenie, and Rățoi.

In the following seasons, the railwaymen competed in Series I of the second division, ranking 10th in 1970–71 and 9th in 1971–72, with Marin Alexandru coaching the first part of the season and Traian Iordache the second. Alexandru returned and led the team for the next three seasons, achieving 5th place, the best result of the decade, in 1972–73, when it also qualified for the Round of 32 in Cupa României, losing 1–2 to Argeș Pitești with a squad that included Ciorcilă, Otic, Rusu, Dinu, Bivolan, Panait, Drăgan, Nazarie (Barbu 78), Bruchental, Mărculescu and Dominte, followed by 9th place in 1973–74 and 11th in 1974–75.

Former team player Viorel Simina took charge for the next three seasons, repeating the 5th-place finish in 1975–76, and after placing 11th in 1976–77, CFR Pașcani was eventually relegated again at the end of the 1977–78 season.

This time it was not possible to return immediately, finishing as runner-up in the 1978–79 season behind CS Botoșani, and the club remained in the third tier. After two mid-table seasons, 6th in 1979–80 and 5th in 1980–81, CFR missed promotion in 1981–82 on goal difference behind Minerul Gura Humorului. In the following season, Pășcănenii finished 3rd, behind Chimia Fălticeni and Zimbrul Siret.

At the end of the 1983–84 campaign, CFR Pașcani, with Constantin Dinu as head coach, won Series I of Divizia C, returning to the second division after six years of absence.

In Divizia B, CFR competed in Series I, finishing 12th in the 1984–85 season, and managed to place several times at mid-table, finishing 6th in 1985–86, 9th in 1986–87, and 6th in the 1987–88 season. The biggest success of that period came in the Cupa României, following victories against Flacăra Moreni (2–2 after extra time and 3–2 on penalties) and FC Olt Scornicești (2–1 a.e.t.), CFR advanced to the quarter-finals, but was eliminated by Victoria București 0–2.

In the 1988–89 season, the team finished in 5th place, with Vasile Simionaș as head coach in the second half of the campaign. CFR Pașcani was relegated at the end of the 1989–90 season. After finishing 3rd in 1990–91, Pășcănenii won Series I of Divizia C in the 1991–92 season under Viorel Sălceanu, but due to the reorganization of the competitive system in the summer of 1992, dictated by the Romanian Football Federation, the club remained in the third division. Sălceanu also led the team during the 1992–93 season, which ended with a 16th-place finish.

CFR continued to compete in Series I of the third tier, ranking 15th in 1993–94, 9th in 1994–95, 10th in 1995–96, 14th in 1996–97, 3rd in 1997–98, 13th in 1998–99, and 9th in 1999–2000. In the 2000–01 season, CFR managed to leave the relegation battle behind and narrowly missed promotion behind Petrolul Moinești. The following season, 2001–02, began under coach Ioan Damian and was completed under Nicolae Zaharia in the second half, with the team finishing 6th. The Railwaymen then ranked 4th in both 2002–03 and 2003–04, both seasons under Emil Lupulescu, followed by 10th in 2004–05, 2nd in 2005–06 behind Politehnica Iași II, 12th in 2006–07, 8th in 2007–08, and 11th in 2008–09.

In the summer of 2009, the club changed its name to CSM Pașcani and continued in Liga III. In 2012 it was renamed once again, this time as Kosarom Pașcani after the name of the main sponsor. In the summer of 2014 it reverted to CSM Pașcani.

In the 2021–22 campaign, Pașcani finished last in Series I and was relegated after thirty-two years in the third tier of Romanian football. CSM Pașcani then spent four seasons in Liga IV Iași County, finishing runner-up in both 2023–24 and 2024–25, before winning the county title in 2025–26 and securing promotion to Liga III by defeating Cimentul Bicaz 3–2 away and 3–1 at home in the promotion play-off.

Chronology of names
Name	Period
CFR Pașcani	1921–1934
Unirea CFR Pașcani	1934–1948
CFR Pașcani	1948–1950
Locomotiva Pașcani	1950–1958
CFR Pașcani	1958–2009
CSM Pașcani	2009–2012
Kosarom Pașcani	2012–2014
CSM Pașcani	2014–present

== Honours ==
Liga III

- Winners (5): 1958–59, 1969–70, 1971–72, 1983–84, 1991–92
- Runners-up (7): 1956, 1978–79, 1981–82, 1984–85, 1985–86, 2000–01, 2005–06

Liga IV – Iași County

- Winners (1): 2025–26
- Runners-up (2): 2023–24, 2024–25

Iași Regional Championship

- Winners (2): 1952, 1953

== League and cup history ==
Season	Tier	Division	Place	Notes	Cupa României
2026–27	3	Liga III (Seria I)	TBD		County phase – Final
2025–26	4	Liga IV (IS)	1st (C, P)	Promoted	Third round
2024–25	4	Liga IV (IS)	2nd		Play-off round
2023–24	4	Liga IV (IS)	2nd		County phase – Winners
2022–23	4	Liga IV (IS)	4th		First round
2021–22	3	Liga III (Seria I)	10th (R)	Relegated	First round
2020–21	3	Liga III (Seria I)	10th	Play-off winner	Second round
2019–20	3	Liga III (Seria I)	16th		First round
2018–19	3	Liga III (Seria I)	13th		First round
2017–18	3	Liga III (Seria I)	13th		First round
2016–17	3	Liga III (Seria I)	13th		
2015–16	3	Liga III (Seria I)	8th		
2014–15	3	Liga III (Seria I)	9th		
2013–14	3	Liga III (Seria I)	5th		
2012–13	3	Liga III (Seria I)	4th		
2011–12	3	Liga III (Seria I)	10th		
2010–11	3	Liga III (Seria I)	4th		
2009–10	3	Liga III (Seria I)	14th		
2008–09	3	Liga III (Seria I)	11th		
2007–08	3	Liga III (Seria I)	8th		
2006–07	3	Liga III (Seria I)	12th		
2005–06	3	Divizia C (Seria I)	2nd		
2004–05	3	Divizia C (Seria I)	10th		
2003–04	3	Divizia C (Seria I)	4th		
2002–03	3	Divizia C (Seria I)	4th		
2001–02	3	Divizia C (Seria I)	6th		
2000–01	3	Divizia C (Seria I)	2nd		
1999–00	3	Divizia C (Seria I)	9th		
1998–99	3	Divizia C (Seria I)	13th		
1997–98	3	Divizia C (Seria I)	3rd		
1996–97	3	Divizia C (Seria I)	14th		
1995–96	3	Divizia C (Seria I)	10th		
1994–95	3	Divizia C (Seria I)	9th		
1993–94	3	Divizia C (Seria I)	15th		
1992–93	3	Divizia C (Seria I)	16th		
1991–92	3	Divizia C (Seria I)	1st (C)		
1990–91	3	Divizia C (Seria I)	3rd		
1989–90	2	Divizia B (Seria I)	16th (R)	Relegated	
1988–89	2	Divizia B (Seria I)	5th		

== Former managers ==
- (Romania) Ion Bălănescu (1947–1950)
- (Romania) Gheorghe Bărbulescu (1958–1960)
- (Romania) Marin Alexandru (1962–1966)
- (Romania) Constantin Dinu (1983–1984)
- (Romania) Vasile Simionaș (1989)
- (Romania) Viorel Sălceanu (1991–1993)
- (Romania) Gheorghe Poenaru (2005–2006)
- (Romania) Vasile Simionaș (2013)
