= 1996–97 Divizia C =

Third tier Romanian football league

Divizia C
- Season: 1996–97

The 1996–97 Divizia C was the 41st season of Liga III, the third tier of the Romanian football league system.

== Team changes ==
=== To Divizia C ===
Relegated from Divizia B

- Portul Constanța
- Bihor Oradea
- Vâlcea

Promoted from Divizia D

- Acumulatorul București
- Electrica Timișoara
- Viitorul Oradea
- Termo Drobeta-Turnu Severin
- Mecanica Mârșa
- Navol Oltenița
- Metalul Filipeștii de Pădure
- Minerul Berbești
- Metalul Toflea
- Romradiatoare Brașov
- Olt 90 Scornicești
- Minerul Baia Sprie
- Unirea Pitești
- CPL Arad
- Electrica Voința Constanța
- Steaua Mecanica Huși

=== From Divizia C ===
Promoted to Divizia B

- Petrolul Moinești
- Danubiana București
- Precizia Săcele
- CFR Cluj

Relegated to Divizia D

- Acord Focșani
- Sportul Municipal Vaslui
- CFR Tepro Iași
- Romgal Romanu
- Juventus Colentina București
- Petrolul Roata de Jos
- Petrolul Teleajen Ploiești
- Sportul Studențesc Agrariana Braniștea
- Petrolul Drăgășani
- Constructorul Craiova
- Metalurgistul Sadu
- Minerul Cavnic
- Olimpia Salonta
- Vulturii Lugoj
- Sighetu Marmației

=== Other changes ===
- FC Caracal, which had been relegated from Divizia B in the previous season, merged with Unirea Alexandria, also relegated from Divizia B, and was absorbed into the new entity FC Alexandria.
- Unirea 95 Focșani was renamed Vrancea Focșani.
- Minerul Vatra Dornei was renamed Dorna Vatra Dornei.
- FC Arad was renamed Telecom Arad.
- Șoimii Compa Sibiu was renamed Șoimii Sibiu.
- Viromet Victoria took the place of FC Sfântu Gheorghe.
- Constructorul Reghin took the place of Mureșul Toplița.
- Astra Ploiești merged with Danubiana București and takes its place in Divizia B.
- Victoria 96 Florești took the place of Astra Ploiești.
- Mobila Șimleu Silvaniei took the place of Laminorul Zalău.

== League tables ==
=== Series I ===
Pos	Team	Pld	W	D	L	GF	GA	GD	Pts	Qualification or relegation
1	Nitramonia Făgăraș (C, P)	34	21	4	9	58	31	+27	67	Promotion to Divizia B
2	ICIM Brașov	34	19	4	11	52	30	+22	61	
3	Rafinăria Dărmănești	34	18	3	13	62	44	+18	57	
4	Petrolul Ianca	34	16	4	14	49	43	+6	52	
5	Chimica Târnaveni	34	15	6	13	55	43	+12	51	
6	Letea Bacău	34	13	10	11	39	34	+5	49	
7	Romradiatoare Brașov	34	12	12	10	41	39	+2	48	
8	Viromet Victoria	34	15	2	17	46	42	+4	47	
9	Minerul 92 Comănești	34	14	4	16	48	43	+5	46	
10	Petrolul Berca	34	12	9	13	47	46	+1	45	
11	Vrancart Adjud	34	14	3	17	41	44	−3	45	
12	Constructorul Reghin	34	14	3	17	35	60	−25	45	
13	Vrancea Focșani	34	12	8	14	45	43	+2	44	
14	CFR Pașcani	34	13	5	16	37	48	−11	44	
15	Dorna Vatra Dornei	34	14	2	18	40	68	−28	44	
16	Harghita Odorheiu Secuiesc	34	12	7	15	33	42	−9	43	
17	Metalul Toflea (R)	34	13	3	18	47	54	−7	42	Relegation to Divizia D
18	Steaua Mecanica Huși (R)	34	12	5	17	37	58	−21	41	Relegation to Divizia D
19	Melana Săvinești (Note: Melana Săvinești and Zimbrul Siret withdrew after the first part of the season and all their results were canceled.) (R)	0	0	0	0	0	0	0	0	Withdrew
20	Zimbrul Siret (R)	0	0	0	0	0	0	0	0	Withdrew

Source: romaniansoccer.rorsssf.org
Rules for classification: 1) Points; 2) Goal difference; 3) Number of goals scored.
(C) Champions; (P) Promoted; (R) Relegated

=== Series II ===
Pos	Team	Pld	W	D	L	GF	GA	GD	Pts	Qualification or relegation
1	Midia Năvodari (C, P)	36	24	4	8	64	29	+35	76	Promotion to Divizia B
2	Cimentul Fieni	36	21	9	6	64	24	+40	72	
3	Electromagnetica București	36	20	4	12	62	43	+19	64	
4	Faur București	36	16	9	11	59	41	+18	57	
5	Metalul Filipeștii de Pădure	36	16	7	13	51	35	+16	55	
6	Petrolistul Boldești	36	16	6	14	54	46	+8	54	
7	Cimentul Medgidia	36	16	6	14	46	52	−6	54	
8	Portul Constanța	36	15	8	13	57	45	+12	53	
9	Inter Dunărea Giurgiu	36	15	7	14	78	63	+15	52	
10	Callatis Mangalia	36	16	3	17	53	54	−1	51	
11	Victoria 96 Florești	36	15	6	15	42	54	−12	51	
12	Navol Oltenița	36	15	6	15	52	61	−9	51	
13	Flacăra Moreni	36	15	5	16	49	54	−5	50	
14	Gloria Iris Cornești	36	15	4	17	52	59	−7	49	
15	SNC Constanța	36	13	6	17	48	48	0	45	
16	Acumulatorul București	36	12	8	16	40	53	−13	44	
17	Atletic Bucureşti (R)	36	13	2	21	43	68	−25	41	Relegation to Divizia D
18	Aversa București (R)	36	10	5	21	37	61	−24	35	Relegation to Divizia D
19	Electrica Voința Constanța (R)	36	5	3	28	18	79	−61	18	Relegation to Divizia D
20	Chimia București (Note: Chimia București withdrew after the first part of the season and all its results were canceled.) (D)	0	0	0	0	0	0	0	0	Withdrew

Source: romaniansoccer.rorsssf.org
Rules for classification: 1) Points; 2) Goal difference; 3) Number of goals scored.
(C) Champions; (D) Disqualified; (P) Promoted; (R) Relegated

=== Series III ===
Pos	Team	Pld	W	D	L	GF	GA	GD	Pts	Qualification or relegation
1	Vega Deva (C, P)	38	25	4	9	82	56	+26	79	Promotion to Divizia B
2	Drobeta-Turnu Severin	38	23	6	9	74	45	+29	75	
3	Olt 90 Scornicești	38	19	8	11	62	40	+22	65	
4	Minerul Berbești	38	19	2	17	72	61	+11	59	
5	Minerul Uricani	38	18	5	15	72	65	+7	59	
6	Minerul Certej	38	19	2	17	68	62	+6	59	
7	Petrolul Stoina	38	18	3	17	77	69	+8	57	
8	Minerul Mătăsari	38	18	3	17	61	53	+8	57	
9	Parângul Lonea	38	18	2	18	70	70	0	56	
10	Unirea Pitești	38	16	6	16	54	40	+14	54	
11	Petrolul Țicleni	38	17	3	18	56	67	−11	54	
12	Minerul Lupeni	38	16	4	18	51	64	−13	52	
13	Petrolul Videle	38	16	3	19	53	63	−10	51	
14	Mine-Ral Rovinari	38	16	3	19	52	63	−11	51	
15	Termo Drobeta-Turnu Severin	38	15	5	18	52	58	−6	50	
16	Vâlcea	38	15	5	18	45	61	−16	50	
17	Alexandria (R)	38	15	4	19	50	50	0	49	Relegation to Divizia D
18	Minerul Anina (R)	38	15	4	19	57	63	−6	49	Relegation to Divizia D
19	Paroșeni Vulcan (R)	38	12	6	20	43	63	−20	35 (Note: Paroșeni Vulcan deducted 7 points.)	Relegation to Divizia D
20	Metalul Bocșa (R)	38	9	4	25	37	75	−38	31	Relegation to Divizia D

Source: romaniansoccer.rorsssf.org
Rules for classification: 1) Points; 2) Goal difference; 3) Number of goals scored.
(C) Champions; (P) Promoted; (R) Relegated

=== Series IV ===
Pos	Team	Pld	W	D	L	GF	GA	GD	Pts	Qualification or relegation
1	UM Timișoara (C, P)	36	28	3	5	84	28	+56	87	Promotion to Divizia B
2	IS Câmpia Turzii	36	23	7	6	58	22	+36	76	
3	Minerul Ștei	36	19	2	15	61	56	+5	59	
4	Șoimii Sibiu	36	18	4	14	57	34	+23	58	
5	Astral Deta	36	18	2	16	60	49	+11	56	
6	Armătura Zalău	36	17	5	14	55	50	+5	56	
7	Bihor Oradea	36	16	6	14	62	44	+18	54	
8	Phoenix Baia Mare	36	16	3	17	82	61	+21	51	
9	Electrica Timișoara	36	14	7	15	47	52	−5	49	
10	Minerul Baia Borșa	36	15	2	19	56	71	−15	47	
11	Sticla Arieșul Turda	36	14	4	18	59	69	−10	46	
12	Metalurgistul Cugir	36	14	4	18	46	60	−14	46	
13	Mobila Șimleu Silvaniei	36	15	1	20	49	79	−30	46	
14	Viitorul Victoria Oradea	36	14	3	19	53	60	−7	45	
15	Telecom Arad	36	13	6	17	39	54	−15	45	
16	West Petrom Pecica	36	13	6	17	61	82	−21	45	
17	CPL Arad (R)	36	13	5	18	33	58	−25	44	Relegation to Divizia D
18	Motorul IMA Arad (R)	36	10	8	18	49	65	−16	38	Relegation to Divizia D
19	Carpați Mecanica Mârșa (R)	36	11	4	21	43	60	−17	37	Relegation to Divizia D
20	Minerul Baia Sprie (Note: Minerul Baia Sprie withdrew from championship and all its results were canceled.) (D)	0	0	0	0	0	0	0	0	Withdrew

Source: romaniansoccer.rorsssf.org
Rules for classification: 1) Points; 2) Goal difference; 3) Number of goals scored.
(C) Champions; (D) Disqualified; (P) Promoted; (R) Relegated

== See also ==
- 1996–97 Divizia A
- 1996–97 Divizia B
- 1996–97 Divizia D
- 1996–97 Cupa României
