= 2000–01 Divizia C =

Third tier Romanian football league

Divizia C
- Season: 2000–01

The 2000–01 Divizia C was the 45th season of Liga III, the third tier of the Romanian football league system.

== Team changes ==
=== To Divizia C ===
Relegated from Divizia B

- Petrolul Moinești
- Dunărea Galați
- Chindia Târgoviște
- Gloria Buzău
- Dacia Pitești
- Chimica Târnăveni
- Universitatea Cluj
- Minerul Motru

Promoted from Divizia D

- Soda Ocna Mureș
- Motorul Astra Arad
- ~~Juventus Bascov~~
- Gloria Zemeș
- Oțelul Ștei
- ~~Voința Mărișelu~~
- Dorohoi
- Cimentul Hoghiz
- Scorillo Grădiștea
- Venus RGAB București
- ~~Aromet Poșta Câlnau~~
- Minerul Moldova Nouă
- Sportul Chirnogi
- Minerul Iara
- Electrica Constanța
- Fortyogó Târgu Secuiesc
- Alpan Teiș Șotânga
- Dunărea Calafat
- ~~Viitorul Costache Negri~~
- ~~Carpați Mecanica Mârșa~~
- ~~Unirea Cristuru Secuiesc~~
- CFR Marmosim Simeria
- Agricultorul Gârbovi
- ~~Viitorul Pașcani~~
- ~~Spicul Afumați~~
- Neoconstruct Mihai Bravu
- Lăpușul Târgu Lăpuș
- Dierna Orșova
- Gaz Metan Târgu Mureș
- CSȘ Târgu Neamț
- SM Drăgănești-Olt
- Petrolistul Boldești
- Șoimii Satu Mare
- ~~Chimia Zalău~~
- ~~Zimbrul Siret~~
- Bere Roșiori
- AS Politehnica Timișoara
- ~~Voința Beștepe~~
- ~~Vipp Bârlad~~
- ~~Cozia Călimănești~~
- ~~Steaua Focșani~~

=== From Divizia C ===
Promoted to Divizia B

- Apemin Borsec
- ~~Hondor Agigea~~
- Fulgerul Bragadiru
- Cetate Deva
- Pandurii Târgu Jiu
- Baia Mare

Relegated to Divizia D

- Siretul Bucecea
- Șantierul Naval Galați
- Tricotex Panciu
- ~~Acvaterm Râmnicu Sărat~~
- Hidroconcas Buzău
- Dunacor Brăila
- Aluminiu Slatina
- Atletic București
- Constructorul Craiova
- ~~Universitatea Arad~~
- CFR Timișoara
- Inter Arad
- Gilortul Târgu Cărbunești
- Rapid Brașov
- Universitatea Sibiu
- Olimpia Salonta
- Silvania Cehu Silvaniei
- Avântul Silva Reghin

=== Renamed teams ===
Vrancart Adjud was renamed as Romstrans Adjud.

Termoutilaj Piatra Neamț was renamed as Ceahlăul Piatra Neamț II.

Fortus Iași was renamed as Unirea 2000 Iași.

Electrica Constanța was renamed as Electrica Dobrogea Constanța.

Agricultorul Gârbovi was renamed as Dinamo Agricultorul Gârbovi.

Robema Roșiori was renamed as Bere Roșiori.

Agricultorul Urziceni was renamed as Unirea Urziceni.

Rova Roșiori was renamed as Municipal Roșiori.

Minerul Horezu was renamed as Prelcon Horezu.

Laminorul Beclean was renamed as Someș Gaz Beclean.

Progresul Șomcuta Mare was renamed as Liber Humana Șomcuta Mare.

=== Other changes ===
Hondor Agigea promoted to Liga II but due to financial problems sold its place to Metalul Plopeni.

Pro Mobila Vatra Dornei was moved from Vatra Dornei to Crucea and was renamed as Pro Mobila Crucea.

CSȘ Târgu Neamț ceded its place to Silvex Târgu Neamț.

Telecom Iași bought the place of Viitorul Pașcani.

Aromet Poșta Câlnau ceded its place to Olimpia Râmnicu Sărat.

Juventus Bascov ceded its place to Internațional Pitești.

Energia Feldioara took the place of Unirea Cristuru Secuiesc.

Gilortul Târgu Cărbunești bought the place of Cozia Călimănești.

Francesca Popești-Leordeni bought the place of Spicul Afumați.

Motorul Astra Arad merged with Universitatea Arad, the first one being absorbed by the second one. The new entity was renamed as ACU Astra Trinity Arad.

Zimbrul Siret, Viitorul Costache Negri, Aversa București, Chimia Zalău, Voința Beștepe, Vipp Bârlad, Steaua Focșani and Forestierul Stâlpeni withdrew.

Foresta Fălticeni II, AS Neptun, Paulo BTA București bought a place.

== League tables ==
=== Seria I ===
Pos	Team	Pld	W	D	L	GF	GA	GD	Pts	Qualification or relegation
1	Petrolul Moinești (C, P)	28	19	5	4	62	20	+42	62	Promotion to Divizia B
2	CFR Pașcani	28	16	3	9	50	29	+21	51	
3	Unirea 2000 Iași	28	13	7	8	44	27	+17	46	
4	Foresta Fălticeni II	28	13	6	9	35	30	+5	45	
5	Budvar Odorheiu Secuiesc	28	11	6	11	38	33	+5	39	
6	Pro Mobila Crucea	28	10	9	9	31	34	−3	39	
7	Rulmentul Bârlad	28	12	2	14	50	44	+6	38	
8	Cimentul Bicaz	28	11	5	12	41	38	+3	38	
9	Energia Feldioara	28	11	5	12	41	44	−3	38	
10	Dorohoi	28	10	6	12	32	41	−9	36	
11	Silvex Târgu Neamț	28	10	6	12	38	45	−7	36	
12	Sportul Municipal Vaslui	28	11	2	15	26	44	−18	35	
13	Ceahlăul Piatra Neamț II	28	10	5	13	33	46	−13	35	
14	Telecom Iași	28	9	7	12	36	47	−11	34	
15	CFR Citadin Iași (R)	28	6	2	20	21	56	−35	20	Relegation to Divizia D
16	Rapid Miercurea Ciuc (Note: Rapid Miercurea Ciuc withdrew before the start of the championship.) (D)	0	0	0	0	0	0	0	0	Withdrew

Source: rsssf.org romaniansoccer.ro
Rules for classification: 1) Points; 2) Goal difference; 3) Number of goals scored.
(C) Champions; (D) Disqualified; (P) Promoted; (R) Relegated

=== Seria II ===
Pos	Team	Pld	W	D	L	GF	GA	GD	Pts	Qualification or relegation
1	Dacia Unirea Brăila (C, P)	30	25	3	2	92	13	+79	78	Promotion to Divizia B
2	Gloria Buzău	30	22	4	4	62	14	+48	70	
3	Petrolul Berca	30	21	2	7	59	31	+28	65	
4	Petrolul Ianca	30	16	6	8	60	32	+28	54	
5	Dunărea Galați	30	17	3	10	45	21	+24	54	
6	Dinamo Agricultorul Gârbovi	30	15	2	13	57	40	+17	47	
7	Rafinăria Dărmănești	30	14	3	13	37	32	+5	45	
8	Olimpia Râmnicu Sărat	30	14	2	14	42	37	+5	44	
9	Aerostar Bacău	30	13	2	15	45	40	+5	41	
10	Sfântu Gheorghe	30	12	2	16	38	45	−7	38	
11	Minerul 92 Comănești	30	11	5	14	40	52	−12	38	
12	Unirea Urziceni	30	11	4	15	39	55	−16	37	
13	Gloria Zemeș	30	10	3	17	38	68	−30	33	
14	Scorillo Grădiștea	30	9	4	17	28	46	−18	31	
15	Romtrans Adjud (Note: Romtrans Adjud withdrew after 20 rounds and lost all remaining matches with 0–3.) (R)	29	4	0	25	21	105	−84	12	Relegation to Divizia D
16	Fortyogó Târgu Secuiesc (Note: Fortyogó Târgu Secuiesc withdrew after 22 rounds and lost all remaining matches with 0–3.) (R)	29	2	1	26	17	89	−72	7	Relegation to Divizia D

Source: rsssf.org romaniansoccer.ro
Rules for classification: 1) Points; 2) Goal difference; 3) Number of goals scored.
(C) Champions; (P) Promoted; (R) Relegated

=== Seria III ===
Pos	Team	Pld	W	D	L	GF	GA	GD	Pts	Qualification or relegation
1	Inter Gaz București (C, P)	30	27	1	2	96	15	+81	82	Promotion to Divizia B
2	Portul Constanța	30	22	1	7	78	26	+52	67	
3	Electrica Dobrogea Constanța	30	15	9	6	57	28	+29	54	
4	Venus RGAB București	30	15	6	9	60	30	+30	51	
5	Unirea Mânăstirea	30	15	4	11	58	52	+6	49	
6	Cimentul Medgidia	30	13	7	10	43	35	+8	46	
7	AS Neptun	30	13	7	10	50	50	0	46	
8	Dunărea Călărași	30	14	3	13	57	44	+13	45	
9	Faur București	30	13	4	13	39	45	−6	43	
10	Francesca Popești-Leordeni	30	12	6	12	52	40	+12	42	
11	Șantierul Naval Tulcea	30	11	5	14	40	40	0	38	
12	Turistul Pantelimon	30	10	7	13	28	39	−11	37	
13	Paulo BTA București	30	11	4	15	42	47	−5	37	
14	Acumulatorul București	30	9	5	16	48	58	−10	32	
15	Sportul Chirnogi (R)	30	2	2	26	28	158	−130	8	Relegation to Divizia D
16	Unirea Slobozia (Note: Unirea Slobozia withdrew after the first part of the season and lost all remaining matches with 0–3.) (R)	30	2	1	27	12	81	−69	7	Relegation to Divizia D

Source: rsssf.org romaniansoccer.ro
Rules for classification: 1) Points; 2) Goal difference; 3) Number of goals scored.
(C) Champions; (P) Promoted; (R) Relegated

=== Seria IV ===
Pos	Team	Pld	W	D	L	GF	GA	GD	Pts	Qualification or relegation
1	Electromagnetica București (C, P)	28	21	4	3	84	23	+61	67	Promotion to Divizia B
2	Flacăra Moreni	28	20	6	2	50	23	+27	66	
3	Alpan Teiș Șotânga	28	14	9	5	36	24	+12	51	
4	Petrolistul Boldești	28	15	4	9	45	32	+13	49	
5	Rulmentul Alexandria	28	14	5	9	35	29	+6	47	
6	Petrolul Videle	28	11	5	12	48	33	+15	38	
7	Inter Dunărea Giurgiu	28	12	2	14	43	50	−7	38	
8	Chindia Târgoviște	28	11	5	12	32	28	+4	38	
9	Conpet Ploiești	28	11	4	13	49	38	+11	37	
10	Conired Pucioasa	28	11	4	13	37	44	−7	37	
11	Metalul Filipeștii de Pădure	28	10	3	15	33	49	−16	33	
12	Chimia Brazi	28	9	5	14	45	44	+1	32	
13	Municipal Roșiori	28	8	6	14	24	41	−17	30	
14	Turris Turnu Măgurele	28	4	7	17	22	59	−37	19	
15	Bere Roșiori (Note: Bere Roșiori withdrew after 16 rounds and lost all remaining matches with 0–3.) (R)	28	4	1	23	9	75	−66	13	Relegation to Divizia D
16	Neoconstruct Mihai Bravu (Note: Neoconstruct Mihai Bravu withdrew in the first part of the season and all its results were canceled.) (D)	0	0	0	0	0	0	0	0	Withdrew

Source: rsssf.org romaniansoccer.ro
Rules for classification: 1) Points; 2) Goal difference; 3) Number of goals scored.
(C) Champions; (D) Disqualified; (P) Promoted; (R) Relegated

=== Seria V ===
Pos	Team	Pld	W	D	L	GF	GA	GD	Pts	Qualification or relegation
1	Internațional Pitești (C, P)	28	23	1	4	71	24	+47	70	Promotion to Divizia B
2	Minerul Motru	28	23	1	4	72	22	+50	70	
3	Gilortul Târgu Cărbunești	28	15	2	11	47	36	+11	47	
4	Oltchim Râmnicu Vâlcea	28	15	1	12	42	31	+11	46	
5	Petrolul Stoina	28	14	2	12	56	53	+3	44	
6	Dacia Pitești	28	12	4	12	50	38	+12	40	
7	Severnav Drobeta-Turnu Severin	28	12	3	13	44	52	−8	39	
8	Minerul Mătăsari	28	12	2	14	50	45	+5	38	
9	Dierna Orșova	28	11	4	13	34	41	−7	37	
10	Petrolul Țicleni	28	12	0	16	45	45	0	36	
11	Dunărea Calafat	28	11	3	14	43	48	−5	36	
12	Petrolul Drăgășani	28	11	2	15	36	58	−22	35	
13	Curtea de Argeș	28	11	2	15	35	46	−11	35	
14	Prelcon Horezu	28	10	2	16	34	60	−26	32	
15	Dinamo Calafat (Note: Dinamo Calafat withdrew after 15 rounds and lost all remaining matches with 0–3.) (R)	28	3	1	24	14	74	−60	10	Relegation to Divizia D
16	SM Drăgănești-Olt (Note: Sportul Muncitoresc Drăgănești-Olt withdrew in the first part of the season and all its results were canceled.) (D)	0	0	0	0	0	0	0	0	Withdrew

Source: rsssf.org romaniansoccer.ro
Rules for classification: 1) Points; 2) Goal difference; 3) Number of goals scored.
(C) Champions; (D) Disqualified; (P) Promoted; (R) Relegated

=== Seria VI ===
Pos	Team	Pld	W	D	L	GF	GA	GD	Pts	Qualification or relegation
1	Minaur Zlatna (C, P)	30	21	2	7	67	25	+42	65	Promotion to Divizia B
2	AS Politehnica Timișoara	30	18	3	9	83	40	+43	57	
3	Electrica Timișoara	30	16	5	9	49	30	+19	53	
4	Minerul Certej	30	14	3	13	54	47	+7	45	
5	Cuprirom Abrud	30	14	2	14	46	41	+5	44	
6	Minerul Moldova Nouă	30	14	2	14	34	38	−4	44	
7	Minerul Lupeni	30	13	5	12	35	37	−2	44	
8	Aurul Brad	30	13	4	13	44	41	+3	43	
9	Soda Ocna Mureș	30	12	6	12	43	43	0	42	
10	Inter Petrila	30	13	3	14	51	60	−9	42	
11	CFR Marmosim Simeria	30	12	6	12	43	42	+1	42	
12	Metalurgistul Cugir	30	12	5	13	37	47	−10	41	
13	Minerul Uricani	30	12	3	15	50	54	−4	39	
14	Telecom Timișoara	30	10	3	17	36	59	−23	33	
15	Caromet Caransebeș (R)	30	9	5	16	35	63	−28	32	Relegation to Divizia D
16	Gloria Reșița (R)	30	6	5	19	19	59	−40	23	Relegation to Divizia D

Source: rsssf.org romaniansoccer.ro
Rules for classification: 1) Points; 2) Goal difference; 3) Number of goals scored.
(C) Champions; (P) Promoted; (R) Relegated

=== Seria VII ===
Pos	Team	Pld	W	D	L	GF	GA	GD	Pts	Qualification or relegation
1	Industria Sârmei Câmpia Turzii (C, P)	26	20	2	4	58	19	+39	62	Promotion to Divizia B
2	Gaz Metan Târgu Mureș	26	16	4	6	46	19	+27	50 (Note: Gaz Metan Târgu Mureș deducted 2 points.)	
3	Someș Gaz Beclean	26	16	2	8	42	30	+12	50	
4	Chimica Târnăveni	26	14	2	10	34	27	+7	44	
5	Olimpia Gherla	26	13	2	11	37	23	+14	41	
6	Viromet Victoria	26	12	4	10	41	27	+14	40	
7	Textila Prejmer	26	11	5	10	37	32	+5	38	
8	Romradiatoare Brașov	26	12	1	13	40	47	−7	37	
9	Nitramonia Făgăraș	26	12	1	13	39	43	−4	37	
10	CFR Cluj	26	10	5	11	37	35	+2	35	
11	Arieșul Turda	26	11	2	13	37	33	+4	35	
12	Minerul Iara	26	9	3	14	33	42	−9	30	
13	Cimentul Hoghiz (Note: Cimentul Hoghiz and Șoimii Sibiu withdrew after first part of the season and lost all remaining matches with 0–3.)	25	4	2	19	9	59	−50	14	
14	Șoimii Sibiu	25	3	1	21	12	66	−54	10	
15	Voința Mărișelu (Note: Carpați Mecanica Mârșa and Voința Mărișelu withdrew before the start of the championship.) (D)	0	0	0	0	0	0	0	0	Withdrew
16	Carpați Mecanica Mârșa (D)	0	0	0	0	0	0	0	0	Withdrew

Source: rsssf.org romaniansoccer.ro
Rules for classification: 1) Points; 2) Goal difference; 3) Number of goals scored.
(C) Champions; (D) Disqualified; (P) Promoted

=== Seria VIII ===
Pos	Team	Pld	W	D	L	GF	GA	GD	Pts	Qualification or relegation
1	Universitatea Cluj (C, P)	28	20	5	3	65	19	+46	65	Promotion to Divizia B
2	Telecom Arad	28	16	7	5	69	27	+42	55	
3	Unirea Dej	28	16	6	6	44	20	+24	54	
4	ACU Astra Trinity Arad	28	14	4	10	44	35	+9	46	
5	Liber Humana Șomcuta Mare	28	11	6	11	34	41	−7	39	
6	Armătura Zalău	28	11	5	12	39	48	−9	38	
7	Someșul Satu Mare	28	12	1	15	27	39	−12	37	
8	Crișul Aleșd	28	11	3	14	44	42	+2	36	
9	Minerul Sărmășag	28	10	6	12	44	49	−5	36	
10	West Petrom Pecica	28	10	6	12	43	48	−5	36	
11	Oașul Negrești-Oaș	28	10	5	13	41	47	−6	35	
12	Oțelul Ștei	28	10	4	14	35	46	−11	34	
13	Lăpușul Târgu Lăpuș	28	8	8	12	37	53	−16	32	
14	Șoimii Satu Mare	28	7	6	15	32	50	−18	27	
15	Minerul Ocna Dej (R)	28	6	4	18	22	56	−34	22	Relegation to Divizia D
16	Phoenix Baia Mare (Note: Phoenix Baia Mare withdrew in the first part of the season and lost all remaining matches with 0–3.) (D)	0	0	0	0	0	0	0	0	Withdrew

Source: rsssf.org romaniansoccer.ro
Rules for classification: 1) Points; 2) Goal difference; 3) Number of goals scored.
(C) Champions; (D) Disqualified; (P) Promoted; (R) Relegated

== See also ==
- 2000–01 Divizia A
- 2000–01 Divizia B
- 2000–01 Divizia D
- 2000–01 Cupa României
