= 2001–02 Divizia C =

Third tier Romanian football league

Divizia C
- Season: 2001–02

The 2001–02 Divizia C was the 46th season of Liga III, the third tier of the Romanian football league system.

== Team changes ==
=== To Divizia C ===
Relegated from Divizia B

- ~~Cimentul Fieni~~
- Apemin Borsec
- Callatis Mangalia
- Juventus Colentina București
- Precizia Săcele
- Politehnica Iași
- Drobeta-Turnu Severin
- Corvinul Hunedoara
- Electro Craiova
- FCM Râmnicu Vâlcea
- Cetate Deva
- ~~Inter Sibiu~~

Promoted from Divizia D

- RATC Iași
- Bucovina Rădăuți
- Unirea Negrești
- Juventus Focșani
- ~~FC Ianca~~
- Oil Terminal Constanța
- Ambianța Valea Ciorii
- Unirea Tricolor Bolintin-Vale
- Hidrojet Breaza
- Petrolul Steaua Târgoviște
- Pan Group Armata Craiova
- Parângul Novaci
- Forestierul Stâlpeni
- Bucegi Predeal
- Metalul Oțelu Roșu
- Viitorul Gheorgheni
- Tricotaje Ineu
- Rapid CFR Teiuș
- Unirea Ungheni
- Viitorul Oradea
- Marmația Sighetu Marmației

=== From Divizia C ===
Promoted to Divizia B

- Petrolul Moinești
- Dacia Unirea Brăila
- Inter Gaz București
- Electromagnetica București
- Internațional Pitești
- Minaur Zlatna
- Industria Sârmii Câmpia Turzii
- Universitatea Cluj

Relegated to Divizia D

- CFR Citadin Iași
- Romtrans Adjud
- Fortyogó Târgu Secuiesc
- Sportul Chirnogi
- Unirea Slobozia
- Bere Roșiori
- Neoconstruct Mihai Bravu
- Dinamo Calafat
- SM Drăgănești-Olt
- Caromet Caransebeș
- Gloria Reșița
- Minerul Ocna Dej
- Phoenix Baia Mare

=== Renamed teams ===
RATC Iași was renamed as RATC CFR Moldova Iași.

Hidrojet Breaza was renamed as Tricolorul Breaza.

Inter Dunărea Giurgiu was renamed as Național Dunărea Giurgiu.

Unirea Tricolor Bolintin-Vale was renamed as Petrolul Unirea Bolintin-Vale.

FCM Râmnicu Vâlcea was renamed as Viitorul Râmnicu Vâlcea.

Cetate Deva was renamed as Mureșul Deva.

=== Other changes ===
Cimentul Fieni bought the Metrom Brașov place in the second division, club which continued to play in the third division instead of Cimentul.

Unirea 2000 Iași merged with Politehnica Iași, the first one being absorbed by the second one. The team was renamed as Politehnica Unirea Iași.

FC Botoșani took the place of FCM Dorohoi.

AMSO Sibiu took the place of Minerul 92 Comănești.

Minerul Berbești took the place of Prelcon Horezu.

Dacia Pitești merged with AS Mioveni, the first one being absorbed by the second one. The team was renamed as Dacia Mioveni.

Alpan Teiș Șotânga was moved from Șotânga to Târgoviște and renamed as Alpan U Târgoviște.

Ambianța Valea Ciorii was moved from Valea Ciorii to Slobozia and renamed as Ambianța Slobozia.

Francesca Popești-Leordeni withdrew before the start of the season and was replaced by Aversa București.

Rapid Miercurea Ciuc, Voința Mărișelu and Carpați Mecanica Mârșa withdrew before the start of the previous season.

Cimentul Hoghiz and Șoimii Sibiu withdrew during the previous season.

Silvex Târgu Neamț, FC Ianca, Metalul Filipeștii de Pădure, Turris Turnu Măgurele, Acumulatorul București, Telecom Timișoara, Turistul Pantelimon, Inter Sibiu, Textila Prejmer and Oțelul Ștei withdrew.

Voința București, Dunărea Zimnicea, AS Voluntari and Dacia Orăștie bought a place.

== League tables ==
=== Seria I ===
Pos	Team	Pld	W	D	L	GF	GA	GD	Pts	Qualification or relegation
1	Politehnica Unirea Iași (C, P)	30	23	5	2	85	19	+66	74	Promotion to Divizia B
2	Botoșani	30	15	6	9	54	30	+24	49 (Note: Botoșani deducted 2 points.)	
3	Rafinăria Dărmănești	30	14	7	9	58	25	+33	49	
4	Sportul Municipal Vaslui	30	17	7	6	45	45	0	48 (Note: Sportul Municipal Vaslui deducted 10 points.)	
5	Cimentul Bicaz	30	12	7	11	38	38	0	43	
6	CFR Pașcani	30	12	6	12	36	39	−3	42	
7	Aerostar Bacău	30	13	2	15	39	38	+1	41	
8	Rulmentul Bârlad	30	10	10	10	40	50	−10	40	
9	Unirea Negrești	30	10	8	12	23	37	−14	38	
10	Ceahlăul Piatra Neamț II	30	11	4	15	43	45	−2	36 (Note: Ceahlăul Piatra Neamț II deducted 1 point.)	
11	Pro Mobila Crucea	30	11	6	13	32	40	−8	39	
12	Telecom Iași	30	9	9	12	34	41	−7	36	
13	RATC CFR Moldova Iași	30	8	8	14	37	50	−13	32	
14	Bucovina Rădăuți	30	8	7	15	34	43	−9	31	
15	Foresta Fălticeni II (R)	30	6	10	14	26	46	−20	28	Relegation to Divizia D
16	Gloria Zemeș (R)	30	8	4	18	32	70	−38	28	Relegation to Divizia D

Source: rsssf.org romaniansoccer.ro
Rules for classification: 1) Points; 2) Goal difference; 3) Number of goals scored.
(C) Champions; (P) Promoted; (R) Relegated

=== Seria II ===
Pos	Team	Pld	W	D	L	GF	GA	GD	Pts	Qualification or relegation
1	Gloria Buzău (C, P)	28	21	5	2	54	14	+40	68	Promotion to Divizia B
2	Petrolistul Boldești	28	20	4	4	58	23	+35	64	
3	Conpet Ploiești	28	16	6	6	43	23	+20	54	
4	Alpan U Târgoviște	28	15	7	6	44	19	+25	52	
5	Petrolul Berca	28	13	5	10	58	45	+13	44	
6	Dunărea Galați	28	11	6	11	43	43	0	39	
7	Chindia Târgoviște	28	12	3	13	39	39	0	39	
8	Flacăra Moreni	28	11	6	11	45	43	+2	39	
9	Tricolorul Breaza	28	11	4	13	47	43	+4	37	
10	Chimia Brazi	28	11	2	15	38	40	−2	35	
11	Petrolul Steaua Târgoviște	28	10	4	14	32	46	−14	34	
12	Olimpia Râmnicu Sărat	28	9	5	14	35	36	−1	32	
13	Conired Pucioasa	28	8	3	17	30	46	−16	27	
14	AS Voluntari	28	7	3	18	31	75	−44	24	
15	Juventus Focșani (R)	28	3	1	24	25	87	−62	10	Relegation to Divizia D
16	Scorillo Grădiștea (Note: Scorillo Grădiștea withdrew in the first part of the season and all its results were canceled.) (D)	0	0	0	0	0	0	0	0	Withdrew

Source: rsssf.org romaniansoccer.ro
Rules for classification: 1) Points; 2) Goal difference; 3) Number of goals scored.
(C) Champions; (D) Disqualified; (P) Promoted; (R) Relegated

=== Seria III ===
Pos	Team	Pld	W	D	L	GF	GA	GD	Pts	Qualification or relegation
1	Municipal Medgidia (C, P)	30	21	4	5	60	26	+34	67	Promotion to Divizia B
2	Callatis Mangalia	30	17	7	6	54	23	+31	58	
3	Aversa București	30	17	2	11	63	35	+28	53	
4	Dunărea Zimnicea	30	16	5	9	44	30	+14	53	
5	Electrica Dobrogea Constanța	30	14	4	12	34	31	+3	46	
6	Dunărea Călărași	30	14	4	12	53	52	+1	46	
7	Petrolul Ianca	30	13	6	11	45	34	+11	45	
8	Șantierul Naval Tulcea	30	11	9	10	35	26	+9	42	
9	Oil Terminal Constanța	30	11	8	11	50	39	+11	41	
10	Voința București	30	11	7	12	36	40	−4	40	
11	Portul Constanța	30	12	2	16	35	47	−12	38	
12	AS Neptun	30	11	4	15	44	45	−1	37	
13	Unirea Urziceni	30	10	4	16	30	65	−35	34	
14	Dinamo Agricultorul Gârbovi (Note: Dinamo Agricultorul Gârbovi and Unirea Mânăstirea withdrew after the first part of the season and lost all remaining matches with 0–3.) (R)	29	8	3	18	25	59	−34	27	Relegation to Divizia D
15	Ambianța Slobozia	30	11	4	15	42	52	−10	16 (Note: Ambianța Slobozia deducted 21 points.)	
16	Unirea Mânăstirea (R)	29	4	3	22	30	76	−46	15	Relegation to Divizia D

Source: rsssf.org romaniansoccer.ro
Rules for classification: 1) Points; 2) Goal difference; 3) Number of goals scored.
(C) Champions; (P) Promoted; (R) Relegated

=== Seria IV ===
Pos	Team	Pld	W	D	L	GF	GA	GD	Pts	Qualification or relegation
1	Rulmentul Alexandria (C, P)	30	22	4	4	60	18	+42	70	Promotion to Divizia B
2	Juventus Colentina București	30	21	5	4	51	16	+35	68	
3	Dacia Mioveni	30	15	5	10	43	39	+4	50	
4	Pan Group Armata Craiova	30	14	8	8	54	32	+22	50	
5	Național Dunărea Giurgiu	30	14	5	11	62	39	+23	47	
6	Venus RGAB București	30	14	5	11	34	30	+4	47	
7	Dunărea Calafat	30	12	7	11	44	38	+6	43	
8	Petrolul Unirea Bolintin-Vale	30	12	5	13	41	41	0	41	
9	Electro Craiova	30	12	5	13	37	41	−4	41	
10	Petrolul Videle	30	11	6	13	45	34	+11	39	
11	Curtea de Argeș	30	11	6	13	40	47	−7	39	
12	Petrolul Drăgășani	30	9	10	11	43	41	+2	37	
13	Faur București	30	9	7	14	34	44	−10	34	
14	Municipal Roșiori	30	9	6	15	26	46	−20	33	
15	Forestierul Stâlpeni (R)	30	6	7	17	28	50	−22	25	Relegation to Divizia D
16	Paulo BTA București (Note: Paulo BTA București withdrew in the second part of the season and lost all remaining matches with 0–3.) (R)	30	3	1	26	14	100	−86	10	Relegation to Divizia D

Source: rsssf.org romaniansoccer.ro
Rules for classification: 1) Points; 2) Goal difference; 3) Number of goals scored.
(C) Champions; (P) Promoted; (R) Relegated

=== Seria V ===
Pos	Team	Pld	W	D	L	GF	GA	GD	Pts	Qualification or relegation
1	Gilortul Târgu Cărbunești (C, P)	30	21	2	7	55	23	+32	65	Promotion to Divizia B
2	Minerul Motru	30	20	3	7	69	29	+40	63	
3	Minerul Mătăsari	30	17	2	11	42	30	+12	53	
4	Oltchim Râmnicu Vâlcea	30	16	3	11	43	26	+17	51	
5	Petrolul Stoina	30	15	5	10	66	45	+21	50	
6	Electrica Timișoara	30	15	3	12	45	33	+12	48	
7	Minerul Moldova Nouă	30	14	5	11	41	34	+7	47	
8	AS Politehnica Timișoara	30	12	6	12	47	37	+10	42	
9	Severnav Drobeta-Turnu Severin	30	12	5	13	53	55	−2	41	
10	Parângul Novaci	30	11	6	13	31	43	−12	39	
11	Petrolul Țicleni	30	11	4	15	36	49	−13	37	
12	Dierna Orșova	30	9	9	12	36	48	−12	36	
13	Viitorul Râmnicu Vâlcea	30	10	6	14	27	43	−16	36	
14	Metalul Oțelu Roșu	30	10	4	16	29	44	−15	34	
15	Minerul Uricani (R)	30	6	5	19	40	70	−30	23	Relegation to Divizia D
16	Drobeta-Turnu Severin (Note: Drobeta-Turnu Severin withdrew in the second part of the season and lost all remaining matches with 0–3.) (R)	30	6	2	22	22	73	−51	14 (Note: Drobeta-Turnu Severin deducted 6 points.)	Relegation to Divizia D

Source: rsssf.org romaniansoccer.ro
Rules for classification: 1) Points; 2) Goal difference; 3) Number of goals scored.
(C) Champions; (P) Promoted; (R) Relegated

=== Seria VI ===
Pos	Team	Pld	W	D	L	GF	GA	GD	Pts	Qualification or relegation
1	Corvinul Hunedoara (C, P)	30	23	4	3	64	18	+46	73	Promotion to Divizia B
2	Minerul Certej (Note: The match Soda Ocna Mureș - Minerul Certej was ruled 0–3 loss for both.)	30	23	2	5	67	25	+42	71	
3	ACU Astra Trinity Arad	30	17	4	9	56	29	+27	55	
4	Minerul Lupeni	30	16	3	11	49	37	+12	51	
5	Telecom Arad	30	14	3	13	58	47	+11	45	
6	Cuprirom Abrud	30	12	3	15	33	43	−10	39	
7	Metalurgistul Cugir	30	12	3	15	42	44	−2	39	
8	Mureșul Deva	30	12	3	15	51	43	+8	39	
9	Soda Ocna Mureș	30	13	3	14	55	45	+10	36 (Note: Soda Ocna Mureș deducted 6 points.)	
10	Dacia Orăștie	30	10	5	15	34	52	−18	35	
11	Tricotaje Ineu	30	10	5	15	39	46	−7	35	
12	CFR Marmosim Simeria	30	10	4	16	31	64	−33	34	
13	West Petrom Pecica	30	8	9	13	30	47	−17	33	
14	Rapid CFR Teiuș	30	9	4	17	37	70	−33	31	
15	Inter Petrila (R)	30	9	4	17	33	61	−28	31	Relegation to Divizia D
16	Aurul Brad (R)	30	7	9	14	27	41	−14	30	Relegation to Divizia D

Source: rsssf.org romaniansoccer.ro
Rules for classification: 1) Points; 2) Goal difference; 3) Number of goals scored.
(C) Champions; (P) Promoted; (R) Relegated

=== Seria VII ===
Pos	Team	Pld	W	D	L	GF	GA	GD	Pts	Qualification or relegation
1	Metrom Brașov (C, P)	28	20	3	5	58	21	+37	63	Promotion to Divizia B
2	Precizia Săcele	28	18	3	7	52	22	+30	50 (Note: Precizia Săcele deducted 7 points.)	
3	Chimica Târnăveni	28	15	5	8	40	21	+19	50	
4	Romradiatoare Brașov	28	15	2	11	33	25	+8	47	
5	Sfântu Gheorghe	28	14	4	10	42	33	+9	46	
6	Viromet Victoria	28	14	4	10	42	33	+9	46	
7	Nitramonia Făgăraș	28	14	2	12	43	36	+7	44	
8	Gaz Metan Târgu Mureș	28	12	4	12	36	36	0	40	
9	Energia Feldioara	28	11	5	12	33	31	+2	38	
10	Unirea Ungheni	28	11	3	14	34	46	−12	36	
11	Budvar Odorheiu Secuiesc	28	10	5	13	36	38	−2	35	
12	Bucegi Predeal	28	9	6	13	27	36	−9	33	
13	AMSO Sibiu	28	8	6	14	28	43	−15	30	
14	Minerul Berbești	28	8	3	17	31	52	−21	27	
15	Viitorul Gheorgheni (R)	28	3	1	24	9	71	−62	10	Relegation to Divizia D
16	Apemin Borsec (Note: Apemin Borsec withdrew in the first part of the season and all its results were canceled.) (D)	0	0	0	0	0	0	0	0	Withdrew

Source: rsssf.org romaniansoccer.ro
Rules for classification: 1) Points; 2) Goal difference; 3) Number of goals scored.
(C) Champions; (D) Disqualified; (P) Promoted; (R) Relegated

=== Seria VIII ===
Pos	Team	Pld	W	D	L	GF	GA	GD	Pts	Qualification or relegation
1	CFR Cluj (C, P)	26	21	2	3	60	10	+50	65	Promotion to Divizia B
2	Arieșul Turda	26	18	5	3	53	16	+37	59	
3	Minerul Sărmășag	26	14	8	4	51	25	+26	50	
4	Armătura Zalău	26	14	5	7	67	27	+40	47	
5	Unirea Dej	26	15	2	9	45	18	+27	47	
6	Olimpia Gherla	26	14	5	7	42	25	+17	47	
7	Someș Gaz Beclean	26	11	3	12	44	41	+3	36	
8	Liber Humana Șomcuta Mare (Note: Liber Humana Șomcuta Mare withdrew after 23 rounds and lost all remaining matches with 0–3.) (R)	26	10	2	14	41	48	−7	32	Relegation to Divizia D
9	Șoimii Satu Mare (Note: Șoimii Satu Mare and Lăpușul Târgu Lăpuș withdrew in the second part of the season and lost all remaining matches with 0–3.) (R)	25	9	2	14	27	46	−19	29	Relegation to Divizia D
10	Crișul Aleșd	26	8	4	14	34	47	−13	28	
11	Someșul Satu Mare	26	7	5	14	32	52	−20	26	
12	Oașul Negrești-Oaș	26	7	4	15	34	63	−29	25	
13	Marmația Sighetu Marmației	26	5	2	19	25	87	−62	17	
14	Lăpușul Târgu Lăpuș (R)	25	2	3	20	21	71	−50	9	Relegation to Divizia D
15	Viitorul Oradea (Note: Viitorul Oradea withdrew after 5 rounds and all its results were canceled.) (D)	0	0	0	0	0	0	0	0	Withdrew
16	Minerul Iara (Note: Minerul Iara withdrew before the start of championship.) (D)	0	0	0	0	0	0	0	0	Withdrew

Source: rsssf.org romaniansoccer.ro
Rules for classification: 1) Points; 2) Goal difference; 3) Number of goals scored.
(C) Champions; (D) Disqualified; (P) Promoted; (R) Relegated

== See also ==
- 2001–02 Divizia A
- 2001–02 Divizia B
- 2001–02 Divizia D
- 2001–02 Cupa României
