= FC Altay Constanța =

Altay Constanța
- Full name: Fotbal Club Altay Constanța
- Short name: Altay
- Founded: 1945
- Dissolved: 2006
- Ground: Electrica
- Capacity: 1,500
| Home colours | Away colours |

Fotbal Club Altay Constanța was a Romanian football club based in Constanța, Constanța County, founded in 1945 and dissolved in 2006, having last competed in the 2005–06 Divizia B season.

== History ==
The club was founded in 1945 as SCEC (Societatea de Electricitate Constanța – Constanța Electricity Company) and played in the Regional Championship until the end of the 1962–63 season, when finished as runners-up in Dobrogea Regional Series and promoted to Divizia C. The squad including players such as Cataramă, V. Olteanu, Rădulescu, Giovani, Munteanu, Antonescu, Datcu, Doroș, Mihai, Suliman, Dumitru.

Followed eighteen seasons in the third division in which was a mid-table team and finished twice as runners-up (1973–74 and 1974–75). Nonetheless, the electricians was relegated at the end of the 1980–81 season, finished 15th out of 16 in Series IV.

In the 1994–95 season, Electrica Voința Constanța won the Constanța County Championship but failed to secure promotion after the play-off against Dunărea Grădiștea, the Călărași County winners (0–1 away and 5–1 at home), ranking outside the top sixteen teams in the special table, which determined promotion to Divizia C based on aggregate results.

However, in the following season, Electrica Voința won the county title again and this time managed to promote after defeating Săgeata Stejaru, the Tulcea County winners (7–1 at home and 0–1 away), and subsequently competed in the 1996–97 Divizia C season in Series II, where the team endured a disastrous campaign, finishing 19th out of 20 teams with only 18 points and returning to the fourth tier.

Renamed Electrica Dobrogea Constanța, the club won the Constanța County championship in the 1999–2000 season, earning promotion to Divizia C without a play-off. The team then competed in Series III, finishing 3rd in the 2000–01 season, 5th in 2001–02, and runners-up in 2002–03, securing promotion to Divizia B.

== Honours ==
Liga III

- Runners-up (3): 1973–74, 1974–75, 2002–03

Liga IV – Constanța County

- Winners (5): 1982–83, 1984–85, 1994–95, 1995–96, 1999–2000

== Former managers ==
- (Romania) Cristian Cămui
- (Romania) Constantin Gache
- (Romania) Leonida Nedelcu (2003)
