= 2001–02 Divizia D =

60th season of the Liga IV, the fourth tier of the Romanian football league

Liga IV
- Season: 2001–02

The 2001–02 Divizia D was the 60th season of the Liga IV, the fourth tier of the Romanian football league system. The champions of each county association play against one from a neighboring county in a play-off match played on a neutral venue. The winners of the play-off matches promoted to Divizia C.

== County leagues ==
- Alba (AB)
- Arad (AR)
- Argeș (AG)
- Bacău (BC)
- Bihor (BH)
- Bistrița-Năsăud (BN)
- Botoșani (BT)
- Brașov (BV)
- Brăila (BR)
- Bucharest (B)
- Buzău (BZ)
- Caraș-Severin (CS)
- Călărași (CL)
- Cluj (CJ)
- Constanța (CT)
- Covasna (CV)
- Dâmbovița (DB)
- Dolj (DJ)
- Galați (GL)
- Giurgiu (GR)
- Gorj (GJ)
- Harghita (HR)
- Hunedoara (HD)
- Ialomița (IL)
- Iași (IS)
- Ilfov (IF)
- Maramureș (MM)
- Mehedinți (MH)
- Mureș (MS)
- Neamț (NT)
- Olt (OT)
- Prahova (PH)
- Satu Mare (SM)
- Sălaj (SJ)
- Sibiu (SB)
- Suceava (SV)
- Teleorman (TR)
- Timiș (TM)
- Tulcea (TL)
- Vaslui (VS)
- Vâlcea (VL)
- Vrancea (VN)

== Promotion play-off ==
The matches were played on 8 June 2002.

Team 1	Score	Team 2
Filatura Fălticeni (SV)	2–1 (a.e.t.)	(BT) Prodalcom Vorona
Hidroconstrucția Poiana Teiului (NT)	0–8	(BC) Letea Bacău
Viitorul Hârlău (IS)	3–2	(VS) Victoria Muntenii de Jos
Șoimii Nisprod Mircești (VN)	0–4	(CV) Perkő Sânzieni
Start Corolla Movila Miresei (BR)	0–0 (2–4 p)	(GL) Victoria TC Galați
Turistul Pietroasa Haleș (BZ)	4–1	(IL) Rapid Fetești
CFR Constanța (CT)	3–2 (a.e.t.)	(TL) Dinamo Tulcea
Spic de Grâu București (B)	0–0 (3–5 p)	(PH) Metalul Băicoi
Sportul Ciorogârla (IF)	3–2	(CL) Venus Independența
Utchim Găești (DB)	3–6	(AG) Fulgerul Lerești
Rarora Mateești (VL)	0–3	(OT) Progresul Caracal
Chimia Craiova (DJ)	1–2 (a.e.t.)	(MH) Real Vânju Mare
Săgeata Brăniștari (GR)	0–4	(TR) Turris Turnu Măgurele
CFR Caransebeș (CS)	0–2	(GJ) Mecanica Motru
CFR Timișoara (TM)	1–1 (4–5 p)	(HD) Vulcan
CIL Blaj (AB)	1–1 (5–6 p)	(SB) Textila Cisnădie
Torpedo Zărnești (BV)	3–2	(HR) Minerul Bălan
CF Dej (CJ)	3–2	(MS) Lacul Ursu Mobila Sovata
Foresta Tileagd (BH)	1–2	(AR) Frontiera Curtici
Minerul Rodna (BN)	0–1	(MM) Plastunion Satulung
Rapid Jibou (SJ)	0–3	(SM) Victoria Carei

== Leagues standings ==
=== Arad County ===
Pos	Team	Pld	W	D	L	GF	GA	GD	Pts	Qualification or relegation
1	Frontiera Curtici (C, Q)	30	26	1	3	105	17	+88	79	Qualification to promotion play-off
2	Șiriana Șiria	30	25	1	4	96	30	+66	76	
3	Comera Arad	30	20	2	8	78	36	+42	62	
4	Vulturii Socodor	30	19	2	9	70	43	+27	59	
5	Victoria Nădlac	30	18	2	10	61	53	+8	56	
6	Romvest Arad	30	14	3	13	60	40	+20	45	
7	Înfrățirea Iratoșu	30	14	2	14	47	35	+12	44	
8	Universitatea Arad	30	13	4	13	48	46	+2	43	
9	Gloria Arad	30	12	4	14	60	68	−8	40	
10	Șoimii Lipova	30	11	6	13	49	66	−17	39	
11	Șoimii Pâncota	30	11	2	17	38	59	−21	34 (Note: Șoimii Pâncota deducted 1 point.)	
12	Tricoul Roșu Arad	30	10	3	17	49	66	−17	33	
13	Armonia Ineu	30	9	5	16	54	88	−34	32	
14	Crișul Chișineu-Criș (Note: Crișul Chișineu-Criș was spared from relegation due to the promotion of Frontiera Curtici in Divizia C.)	30	9	2	19	38	77	−39	29	Spared from relegation
15	Progresul Pecica (R)	30	7	5	18	32	68	−36	26	Relegation to Arad County Championship
16	Păulișana Păuliș (Note: Păulișana Păuliș withdrew during the winter break and lost all remaining matches with 0–3.) (R)	30	0	0	30	6	99	−93	0	Relegation to Arad County Championship

Rules for classification: 1) points; 2) goal difference; 3) number of goals scored.
(C) Champions; (Q) Qualified for the phase indicated; (R) Relegated

=== Bihor County ===
Pos	Team	Pld	W	D	L	GF	GA	GD	Pts	Qualification or relegation
1	Foresta Tileagd (C, Q)	30	25	0	5	91	28	+63	75	Qualification to promotion play-off
2	Petrom Abram	30	24	2	4	98	22	+76	74	
3	Olimpia Salonta	30	23	4	3	112	25	+87	73	
4	Minerul Ștei	30	18	7	5	79	26	+53	61	
5	Bihorul Beiuș	30	14	3	13	60	44	+16	45	
6	Petrolul Suplac	30	13	2	15	76	64	+12	41	
7	Unirea Valea lui Mihai	30	12	4	14	45	60	−15	40	
8	Crișana Tinca	30	11	6	13	45	58	−13	39	
9	Bihoreana Marghita	30	11	5	14	41	43	−2	38	
10	Arcadia Oradea	30	11	4	15	56	62	−6	37	
11	Tricolorul Alparea	30	10	6	14	44	60	−16	36	
12	Minerul Vadu Crișului	30	10	3	17	42	73	−31	33	
13	Romtrans Oradea	30	8	7	15	48	52	−4	31	
14	Biharea Vașcău	30	9	4	17	43	72	−29	31	
15	Oțelul Ștei	30	8	4	18	49	43	+6	28	
16	Minerul Șuncuiuș	30	1	1	28	18	210	−192	4	

Rules for classification: 1) points; 2) goal difference; 3) number of goals scored.
(C) Champions; (Q) Qualified for the phase indicated

=== Caraș-Severin County ===
Pos	Team	Pld	W	D	L	GF	GA	GD	Pts	Qualification or relegation
1	CFR Caransebeș (C, Q)	30	22	5	3	67	16	+51	71	Qualification to promotion play-off
2	Arsenal Reșița	30	19	5	6	72	35	+37	62	
3	Universitatea Reșița	30	18	6	6	59	32	+27	60	
4	Gloria Reșița	30	17	4	9	66	33	+33	52 (Note: Gloria Reșița deducted 2 points.)	
5	Caromet Caransebeș	30	14	7	9	53	31	+22	49	
6	Muncitorul Reșița	30	16	1	13	56	48	+8	49	
7	Oravița	30	14	2	14	49	50	−1	44	
8	Minerul Anina	30	11	7	12	46	44	+2	40	
9	Dunărea Moldova Nouă	30	12	3	15	51	50	+1	39	
10	Hercules Băile Herculane	30	12	3	15	35	45	−10	39	
11	Poiana Rusca Teregova (Note: Poiana Rusca Teregova and Luceafărul Petnic withdrew in the second part of the season and lost all remaining matches with 0–3.) (R)	30	12	2	16	37	58	−21	38	Relegation to Caraș-Severin County Championship
12	Foresta Zăvoi	30	11	3	16	53	82	−29	36	
13	Berzasca	30	10	5	15	41	59	−18	35	
14	Nera Bozovici	30	10	3	17	40	52	−12	33	
15	Metalul Bocșa	30	9	4	17	44	64	−20	31	
16	Luceafărul Petnic (R)	30	1	2	27	13	95	−82	5	Relegation to Caraș-Severin County Championship

Rules for classification: 1) points; 2) goal difference; 3) number of goals scored.
(C) Champions; (Q) Qualified for the phase indicated; (R) Relegated

=== Covasna County ===
Pos	Team	Pld	W	D	L	GF	GA	GD	Pts	Qualification or relegation
1	Perkő Sânzieni (C, Q)	34	24	3	7	81	33	+48	75	Qualification to promotion play-off
2	IAS Câmpul Frumos	34	23	2	9	84	36	+48	71	
3	Stăruința Bodoc	34	22	3	9	87	40	+47	69	
4	Victoria Ozun	34	21	2	11	86	61	+25	65	
5	Ciucașul Întorsura Buzăului	34	18	6	10	85	52	+33	60	
6	Prima Brăduț	34	18	5	11	85	41	+44	59	
7	Carpați Covasna	34	17	4	13	73	57	+16	55	
8	Ojdula	34	16	5	13	79	53	+26	53	
9	Minerul Baraolt	34	16	4	14	69	59	+10	52	
10	Micfalău	34	16	2	16	87	84	+3	50	
11	Progresul Sita Buzăului	34	16	2	16	80	92	−12	50	
12	Avântul Catalina	34	14	3	17	62	81	−19	45	
13	Avântul Ilieni	34	13	3	18	58	84	−26	42	
14	Spartacus Hăghig	34	12	4	18	70	93	−23	40	
15	Nemere Ghelința	34	11	4	19	58	89	−31	37	
16	Moacșa	34	10	6	18	56	84	−28	36	
17	Bradul Zagon (R)	34	8	2	24	34	99	−65	26	Relegation to Covasna County Championship
18	Harghita Aita Mare (R)	34	2	2	30	23	112	−89	8	Relegation to Covasna County Championship

Rules for classification: 1) points; 2) goal difference; 3) number of goals scored.
(C) Champions; (Q) Qualified for the phase indicated; (R) Relegated

=== Dolj County ===
Team changes from previous season.

Promoted to Divizia C

- Pan Group Armata Craiova

Relegated from Divizia C

- —

Promoted from Dolj Elite Category

- Vânătorul Desa (Series I winners)
- Unirea Tricolor Dăbuleni (Series II winners)
- AEC Ișalnița (Series III winners)
- Victoria Călărași (Series II, play-off winners)

Relegated to Dolj Elite Category

- Aripile Craiova

Other changes

- MAT Craiova and PRO GPS Segarcea merged to form MAT Segarcea.
- Autobuzul Craiova and Unirea Leamna merged to form Autobuzul Leamna.
- Tractorul Bechet and Victoria Plenița was spared from relegation.
- Tractorul Bechet was renamed as Portul Bechet.
- AEC Ișalnița was renamed as Avântul Ișalnița.

Pos	Team	Pld	W	D	L	GF	GA	GD	Pts	Qualification or relegation
1	Chimia Craiova (C, Q)	28	21	6	1	92	12	+80	69	Qualification to promotion play-off
2	Mârșani	28	16	4	8	57	26	+31	52	
3	Victoria Călărași	28	13	9	6	47	40	+7	48	
4	Gaz Metan Pielești	28	13	8	7	54	29	+25	47	
5	Avântul Ișalnița	28	12	8	8	41	28	+13	44	
6	Recolta Ostroveni	28	13	4	11	57	39	+18	43	
7	Autobuzul Leamna	28	11	7	10	49	36	+13	40	
8	Portul Bechet	28	11	6	11	40	30	+10	39	
9	CFR Marfă Craiova	28	10	8	10	43	31	+12	38	
10	Unirea Tricolor Dăbuleni	28	11	4	13	47	57	−10	37	
11	Victoria Plenița (O)	28	10	6	12	35	53	−18	36	Qualification to relegation play-out
12	Progresul Băilești (O)	28	9	5	14	41	61	−20	32	Qualification to relegation play-out
13	Vânătorul Desa (O)	28	10	2	16	32	74	−42	32	Qualification to relegation play-out
14	Aquaterm Filiași (R)	28	6	5	17	30	77	−47	23	Relegation to Dolj Elite Category
15	Recolta Măceșu de Jos (Note: Recolta Măceșu de Jos excluded after 23 rounds and lost all remaining matches with 0–3.) (R)	28	1	4	23	16	88	−72	7	Relegation to Dolj Elite Category
16	MAT Segarcea (Note: MAT Segarcea withdrew after 12 rounds and all its results were canceled.) (D)	0	0	0	0	0	0	0	0	Excluded

Rules for classification: 1) points; 2) goal difference; 3) number of goals scored.
(C) Champions; (D) Disqualified; (O) Play-off winners; (Q) Qualified for the phase indicated; (R) Relegated
Notes:

Relegation play-out

The 11th, 12th and 13th-placed teams of the Divizia D faces the 2nd placed teams from the three series of Dolj Elite Category. The matches were played on 9 June 2002, on neutral grounds, at Craiova, Segarcea and Băilești.

Team 1	Score	Team 2
SCCF Gioroc	2–6	Vânătorul Desa
Progresul Băilești	2–0	Recolta Urzicuța
Victoria Plenița	3–0	Avântul Țuglui

=== Galați County ===
Pos	Team	Pld	W	D	L	GF	GA	GD	Pts	Qualification or relegation
1	Victoria TC Galați (C, Q)	28	24	3	1	88	18	+70	75	Qualification to promotion play-off
2	Metal Galați	28	23	3	2	91	17	+74	72	
3	Sporting Tecuci	28	18	3	7	62	33	+29	57	
4	Sporting Șivița	28	15	5	8	63	31	+32	50	
5	Hidraulic Galați	28	14	5	9	46	29	+17	47	
6	Viitorul Costache Negri	28	13	4	11	74	51	+23	43	
7	Bujorii Târgu Bujor	28	13	2	13	46	58	−12	41	
8	Dunis Ivești	28	11	5	12	51	51	0	38	
9	Viitorul Berești	28	11	3	14	44	65	−21	36	
10	Metalosport Galați	28	9	3	16	47	65	−18	30	
11	Muncitorul Ghidigeni	28	8	4	16	34	59	−25	28	
12	Dueta Fântânele	28	8	3	17	42	71	−29	27	
13	Voința Liești	28	8	3	17	37	66	−29	27	
14	Dunărea Galați II	28	6	3	19	33	75	−42	21	
15	Inter 2000 Tudor Vladimirescu	28	4	1	23	23	92	−69	13	
16	Șantierul Naval Galați (Note: Șantierul Naval Galați withdrew in the first part of the season and all its results were canceled.) (D)	0	0	0	0	0	0	0	0	Withdrew

Rules for classification: 1) Points; 2) Goal difference; 3) Number of goals scored.
(C) Champions; (D) Disqualified; (Q) Qualified for the phase indicated

=== Harghita County ===
Pos	Team	Pld	W	D	L	GF	GA	GD	Pts	Qualification or relegation
1	Complexul Gălăuțaș (Q)	18	16	1	1	89	11	+78	49	Qualification to championship play-off
2	Minerul Bălan (Q)	18	15	1	2	63	12	+51	46	Qualification to championship play-off
3	Șoimii Băile Tușnad (Q)	18	12	0	6	50	25	+25	36	Qualification to championship play-off
4	Unirea Cristuru Secuiesc	18	9	2	7	34	27	+7	29	
5	Real Tulgheș	18	7	2	9	32	35	−3	23	
6	Știința Sărmaș	18	4	6	8	32	47	−15	18	
7	Harghita Odorheiu Secuiesc	18	5	3	10	23	35	−12	18	
8	Mureșul Toplița	18	4	3	11	28	48	−20	15	
9	Ditroit Ditrău	18	4	2	12	21	73	−52	12 (Note: Detroit Ditrău deducted 2 points.)	
10	Mureșul Remetea	18	2	2	14	17	80	−63	8	

Rules for classification: 1) Points; 2) Head-to-head points; 3) Head-to-head goal difference; 4) Head-to-head goals scored; 5) Head-to-head away goals scored; 6) Goal difference; 7) Goals scored.
(Q) Qualified for the phase indicated
Notes:

Championship play-off

The teams carried all records from the regular season.

Pos	Team	Pld	W	D	L	GF	GA	GD	Pts	Qualification
1	Minerul Bălan (C, Q)	22	19	1	2	74	14	+60	58	Qualification to promotion play-off
2	Complexul Gălăuțaș	22	18	1	3	102	18	+84	55	
3	Șoimii Băile Tușnad	22	12	0	10	52	42	+10	36	

Rules for classification: 1) Points; 2) Goal difference; 3) Number of goals scored.
(C) Champions; (Q) Qualified for the phase indicated

=== Mureș County ===
Pos	Team	Pld	W	D	L	GF	GA	GD	Pts	Qualification or relegation
1	Lacul Ursu Mobila Sovata (Q)	18	15	2	1	52	14	+38	47	Qualification to play-off
2	Maviprod Reghin (Q)	18	15	0	3	75	21	+54	45	Qualification to play-off
3	Iernut (Q)	18	10	4	4	40	22	+18	34	Qualification to play-off
4	Mureșul Târgu Mureș (Q)	18	9	2	7	26	23	+3	29	Qualification to play-off
5	Electromureș Târgu Mureș (Note: Electromureș Târgu Mureș withdrew after 13 rounds and lost all remaining matches with 0–3.)	18	7	2	9	32	37	−5	23	
6	Transilvania Sighișoara	18	7	1	10	37	38	−1	22	
7	Mureșul Romvelo Luduș	18	6	2	10	24	55	−31	20	
8	Târnava Mică Sângeorgiu de Pădure	18	5	2	11	20	35	−15	17	
9	Avântul Miheșu de Câmpie	18	4	2	12	26	45	−19	14	
10	Scorillo Sântana de Mureș	18	3	1	14	16	57	−41	10	
11	Top Electro Sângeorgiu de Mureș (Note: Top Electro Sângeorgiu de Mureș withdrew after 5 rounds and all its results were canceled.) (D)	0	0	0	0	0	0	0	0	Withdrew

Rules for classification: 1) Points; 2) Goal difference; 3) Number of goals scored.
(D) Disqualified; (Q) Qualified for the phase indicated
Notes:

Championship play-off

Pos	Team	Pld	W	D	L	GF	GA	GD	Pts	Qualification
1	Lacul Ursu Mobila Sovata (C, Q)	12	7	3	2	22	14	+8	24	Qualification to promotion play-off
2	Maviprod Reghin	12	7	1	4	30	17	+13	22	
3	Mureșul Târgu Mureș	12	4	2	6	11	20	−9	14	
4	Iernut	12	2	2	8	18	30	−12	8	

Rules for classification: 1) Points; 2) Goal difference; 3) Number of goals scored.
(C) Champions; (Q) Qualified for the phase indicated

=== Neamț County ===
Pos	Team	Pld	W	D	L	GF	GA	GD	Pts	Qualification or relegation
1	Hidroconstrucția Poiana Teiului (C, Q)	26	23	1	2	87	14	+73	70	Qualification to promotion play-off
2	Bradul Roznov	26	19	3	4	97	26	+71	60	
3	Spicul Tămășeni	26	17	1	8	69	50	+19	52	
4	Laminorul Roman II	26	15	5	6	81	27	+54	50	
5	Speranța Răucești	26	15	4	7	68	56	+12	49	
6	Viitorul Podoleni	26	15	2	9	78	45	+33	47	
7	Zimbrul Pâncești	26	12	3	11	64	63	+1	39	
8	Vulturul Zănești	26	11	1	14	60	79	−19	34	
9	Voința Rediu	26	9	3	14	49	87	−38	30	
10	Biruința Negrești	26	8	1	17	33	77	−44	25	
11	Ozer Golden Roman (Note: Ozer Golden Roman and Lorisim Făurei withdrew after 13 rounds and lost all remaining matches with 0–3.)	26	8	0	18	51	55	−4	24	
12	Sirius Bodești	26	7	2	17	43	78	−35	23	
13	Săvinești (Note: Săvinești was excluded after 22 rounds and lost all the remaining matches with 0–3.)	26	7	1	18	41	76	−35	22	
14	Lorisim Făurei	26	1	1	24	26	116	−90	4	

Rules for classification: 1) Points; 2) Goal difference; 3) Number of goals scored.
(C) Champions; (Q) Qualified for the phase indicated

=== Sibiu County ===
Pos	Team	Pld	W	D	L	GF	GA	GD	Pts	Qualification or relegation
1	Textila Cisnădie (C, Q)	32	27	1	4	105	30	+75	82	Qualification to promotion play-off
2	Universitatea Sopo Sibiu	32	24	4	4	103	33	+70	76	
3	Sparta Mediaș	32	23	4	5	107	23	+84	73	
4	Gaz Metan Mediaș II	32	20	4	8	96	30	+66	64	
5	Carpați Mecanica Mârșa	32	20	1	11	117	42	+75	61	
6	Romipel Cordia Sibiu	32	18	4	10	80	77	+3	58	
7	Romanofir Tălmaciu	32	18	4	10	94	55	+39	58	
8	Agnitex Agnita	32	17	5	10	77	41	+36	56	
9	Avântul Dârlos	32	14	2	16	48	62	−14	44	
10	Sevișul Șelimbăr	32	12	3	17	90	92	−2	39	
11	ASA Sibiu	32	10	4	18	57	66	−9	34	
12	Progresul Terezian Sibiu	32	9	5	18	48	85	−37	32	
13	Flamura Roșie Cârța	32	9	4	19	60	143	−83	31	
14	Sticla Avrig	32	8	4	20	52	98	−46	28	
15	Progresul Dumbrăveni	32	8	3	21	59	120	−61	27	
16	Romdor Sibiu	32	7	2	23	44	116	−72	23	
17	Unirea Ocna Sibiului	32	0	2	30	21	142	−121	2	

Rules for classification: 1) Points; 2) Goal difference; 3) Number of goals scored.
(C) Champions; (Q) Qualified for the phase indicated

=== Timiș County ===
Pos	Team	Pld	W	D	L	GF	GA	GD	Pts	Qualification or relegation
1	CFR Timișoara (C, Q)	28	24	2	2	103	21	+82	74	Qualification to promotion play-off
2	Comprest Lugoj	28	23	3	2	83	18	+65	72	
3	Sporting Tabac Textila Timișoara	28	18	2	8	83	48	+35	56	
4	Unirea Banloc (Note: Unirea Banloc replaced Progresul Bayern Gătaia during the winter break and took over all its results.)	28	14	4	10	45	35	+10	46	
5	Calor Timișoara	28	14	4	10	41	35	+6	46	
6	Jimbolia	28	12	8	8	59	21	+38	44	
7	Unirea Peciu Nou	28	13	4	11	50	46	+4	43	
8	Voința 2000 Timișoara	28	13	2	13	29	50	−21	41	
9	Telecom Șag (Note: Telecom Șag started the championship as Telecom Timișoara, but was moved and renamed before the start of the second part.)	28	12	1	15	43	54	−11	37	
10	Unirea Sânnicolau Mare	28	9	7	12	63	65	−2	34	
11	Bancom Comloșu Mare (Note: Bancom Comloșu Mare replaced Vulturii Lugoj during the winter break and took over all its results.)	28	9	3	16	37	76	−39	30	
12	Furnirul Deta	28	8	3	17	47	84	−37	27	
13	Plavii Delia Sânpetru Mare	28	6	6	16	34	57	−23	24	
14	Giarmata (Note: Giarmata replaced Tormactim Tormac during the winter break and took over all its results.)	28	5	4	19	30	90	−60	19	
15	CET Sud Timișoara (Note: CET Sud Timișoara started the championship as Termo Timișoara, but was renamed before the start of the second part.) (R)	28	3	1	24	19	84	−65	10	Relegation to Timiș County Championship
16	Celuloză și Oțel Șag (Note: Celuloză și Oțel Șag withdrew after 14 rounds and all its results were canceled.) (D)	0	0	0	0	0	0	0	0	Withdrew

Rules for classification: 1) points; 2) goal difference; 3) number of goals scored.
(C) Champions; (D) Disqualified; (Q) Qualified for the phase indicated; (R) Relegated

== See also ==
- 2001–02 Divizia A
- 2001–02 Divizia B
- 2001–02 Divizia C
- 2001–02 Cupa României
