= Zoltán Csehi =

Hungarian footballer

Personal information
- Date of birth: 22 July 1972 (age 54)
- Place of birth: Kalocsa, Hungary
- Height: 1.80 m (5 ft 11 in)
- Position: Forward

Senior career*
Years	Team	Apps	(Gls)
1992–1993	Nyíregyháza Spartacus	30	(5)
1993–1997	Kiskőrös	86	(11)
1997	→ Kecskemét (loan)	4	(2)
1997–1998	Hajdúszoboszló	47	(23)
1998–1999	Debrecen	24	(2)
1999–2000	Hajdúszoboszló	37	(15)
2000	Videoton	16	(1)
2001–2003	FC Oradea	59	(32)
2003–2004	Debrecen	6	(0)
2004–2005	Liberty Salonta	11	(3)
2005–2006	Hajdúnánás	0	(0)
2006	Mátészalka	9	(2)
2007	Nyírbéltek	0	(0)
2007	Derecske	10	(4)
2008	Csengőd	0	(0)
2008–2009	Nyírmeggyes	30	(31)
2009–2011	Jászberény	58	(17)
2011–2013	Jászapáti	46	(27)
2013–2015	Nagyiváni	21	(28)
Total		494	(203)
- * Club domestic league appearances and goals as of 6 May 2016

Zoltán Csehi (born 22 July 1972) is a Hungarian former professional footballer who played as a forward. He played in Hungary for various teams, among them: Nyíregyháza Spartacus, Kecskemét, Debrecen and Videoton. In Romania Csehi played for Bihor Oradea and Liberty Salonta.
