= Cristian Șchiopu =

Romanian footballer (born 1974)

Personal information
- Date of birth: 19 January 1974 (age 52)
- Place of birth: Fălticeni, Romania
- Height: 1.75 m (5 ft 9 in)
- Position: Centre back

Senior career*
Years	Team	Apps	(Gls)
1992–1995	Foresta Fălticeni		
1995–1996	Mureșul Toplița		
1996–2002	Foresta Fălticeni	176	(14)
2002–2010	Farul Constanța	189	(4)
Total		365	(18)

Managerial career
- 2011: Callatis Mangalia (assistant)
- 2011: Callatis Mangalia
- * Club domestic league appearances and goals as of 10 September 2024

Cristian Șchiopu (born 19 January 1974) is a Romanian former football player who played as a central back for Foresta Fălticeni, Mureșul Toplița and Farul Constanța.

== Playing career ==
Șchiopu was born on 19 January 1974 in Fălticeni, Romania and began playing football in 1992 at local club Foresta in Divizia B. Two years later the team was relegated to Divizia C, but he stayed with the club, helping it get promoted back after one season. Then he went for one season at Mureșul Toplița in Divizia B. Subsequently, he returned to Foresta which he helped earn promotion to the first league in 1997. He made his Divizia A debut on 2 August under coach Marin Barbu in a 2–1 home loss to Argeș Pitești. In 1999, Foresta was relegated, but Șchiopu helped it gain promotion back after one year. On 11 November 2000, he was used the entire match by coach Barbu in the historical 5–4 away win over Dinamo București after Dinamo at one point led with 4–0. However, at the end of the season, the team was relegated once again.

After staying one season with Foresta in Divizia B, Șchiopu returned to first league football when he signed in 2002 with Farul Constanța. In his first season he scored two goals, the first one being the victory goal of a 2–1 success against Argeș Pitești and the second was in a 1–0 win over UTA Arad. He reached the 2005 Cupa României final, where coach Petre Grigoraș used him the entire match in the 1–0 loss to Dinamo București. In 2006 he started to play in European competitions, appearing in both legs of the 4–2 loss on aggregate to Auxerre in the third round of the Intertoto Cup. In the 2007–08 season, Șchiopu scored his last first league goals from penalty kicks in two 1–0 wins over Ceahlăul Piatra Neamț and Gloria Bistrița. In the following season, on 25 October 2008, he made his last Divizia A appearance in a 1–0 away loss to Unirea Urziceni, totaling 272 matches with eight goals in the competition. Șchiopu wanted to play one more season for Farul in the second league, to help it get promoted back to the first league. However, after he suffered a ligament injury in the first round of the 2009–10 season in a game against Dunărea Giurgiu, Șchiopu decided to retire.

== Coaching career ==
Șchiopu coached mostly at junior level, at Farul Constanța and Gheorghe Hagi's Football Academy, with the latter working three years and winning one national title. He also coached seniors, being Marin Barbu's assistant at Callatis Mangalia in 2011. Subsequently, after Barbu was dismissed, Șchiopu was head coach for a while. In 2016 together with another coach, Cătălin Agafiței, he set up the Constanța Marina 2015 Sports Association, where children were trained in football.

== Honours ==
Foresta Suceava

- Divizia B: 1996–97, 1999–00
- Divizia C: 1994–95

Farul Constanța

- Cupa României runner-up: 2004–05
