= 1997–98 Divizia B =

Divizia B
- Season: 1997–98
- Promoted: Astra Ploiești; Olimpia Satu Mare; FC Onești
- Relegated: Metalul Plopeni; CFR Cluj; Dunărea Călărași; UM Timișoara; Foresta II Fălticeni; Gloria Reșița
- Top goalscorer: Daniel Bona (16 goals)

The 1997–98 Divizia B was the 58th season of the second tier of the Romanian football league system.

The format has been maintained to two series, each of them having 18 teams. At the end of the season, the winners of the series promoted to Divizia A and the last three places from both series relegated to Divizia C. A promotion play-off was played between the runners-up of the series to decide the third team that promoted to Divizia A.

== Team changes ==
=== To Divizia B ===
Promoted from Divizia C

- Nitramonia Făgăraș
- Midia Năvodari
- Vega Deva
- UM Timișoara

Relegated from Divizia A

- Politehnica Timișoara
- Brașov

=== From Divizia B ===
Relegated to Divizia C

- Cetatea Târgu Neamț
- Minaur Zlatna
- Steaua Mizil
- CFR Timișoara

Promoted to Divizia A

- Foresta Fălticeni
- CSM Reșița

=== Renamed teams ===
Danubiana Ploiești was renamed as Astra Ploiești.

Bucovina Suceava merged with Foresta Fălticeni, became the second squad of Foresta and was renamed as Foresta II Fălticeni.

== League tables ==
=== Seria I ===
Pos	Team	Pld	W	D	L	GF	GA	GD	Pts	Qualification
1	Astra Ploiești (C, P)	34	28	4	2	80	20	+60	88	Promotion to Divizia A
2	FC Onești (O, P)	34	28	2	4	86	25	+61	86	Qualification to promotion play-off
3	Brașov	34	20	5	9	51	30	+21	65	
4	Midia Năvodari	34	19	5	10	57	41	+16	62	
5	Tractorul Brașov	34	17	5	12	50	32	+18	56	
6	Petrolul Moinești	34	16	3	15	52	45	+7	51	
7	Poiana Câmpina	34	15	4	15	55	55	0	49	
8	Politehnica Iași	34	14	5	15	47	41	+6	47	
9	Precizia Săcele	34	13	7	14	44	39	+5	46	
10	Rocar București	34	14	4	16	48	47	+1	46	
11	Metrom Brașov	34	12	5	17	31	43	−12	41	
12	Gloria Buzău	34	11	8	15	38	58	−20	41	
13	Dacia Unirea Brăila	34	11	5	18	48	57	−9	38	
14	Dunărea Galați	34	9	8	17	36	60	−24	35	
15	Nitramonia Făgăraș	34	10	4	20	40	58	−18	34	
16	Metalul Plopeni (R)	34	9	7	18	22	51	−29	34	Relegation to Divizia C
17	Dunărea Călărași (R)	34	9	3	22	37	81	−44	30	Relegation to Divizia C
18	Foresta II Fălticeni (R)	34	6	6	22	25	64	−39	24	Relegation to Divizia C

Updated to match(es) played on 30 June 1998. Source: romaniansoccer.ro (in Romanian)
Rules for classification: 1) Points; 2) Head-to-head points; 3) Head-to-head goal difference; 4) Head-to-head goals scored; 5) Head-to-head away goals scored; 6) Goal difference; 7) Goals scored.
(C) Champions; (O) Play-off winners; (P) Promoted; (R) Relegated

=== Seria II ===
Pos	Team	Pld	W	D	L	GF	GA	GD	Pts	Qualification
1	Olimpia Satu Mare (C, P)	34	20	6	8	64	40	+24	66	Promotion to Divizia A
2	Electroputere Craiova	34	20	1	13	63	44	+19	61	Qualification to promotion play-off
3	Maramureș Baia Mare	34	18	6	10	65	36	+29	60	
4	ASA Târgu Mureș	34	18	6	10	51	33	+18	60	
5	Gaz Metan Mediaș	34	17	3	14	44	36	+8	54	
6	Unirea Dej	34	17	3	14	52	44	+8	54	
7	Minerul Motru	34	16	3	15	42	47	−5	51	
8	ARO Câmpulung	34	14	9	11	49	43	+6	51	
9	Corvinul Hunedoara	34	16	2	16	40	37	+3	50	
10	Dacia Pitești	34	15	3	16	54	49	+5	48	
11	UTA Arad	34	13	8	13	50	51	−1	47	
12	Inter Sibiu	34	14	4	16	42	40	+2	46	
13	Vega Deva	34	13	6	15	37	51	−14	45	
14	Apulum Alba Iulia	34	13	4	17	45	60	−15	43	
15	Politehnica Timișoara	34	11	6	17	33	44	−11	39	
16	CFR Cluj (R)	34	11	5	18	41	57	−16	38	Relegation to Divizia C
17	UM Timișoara (R)	34	9	5	20	39	66	−27	32	Relegation to Divizia C
18	Gloria Reșița (R)	34	10	2	22	36	69	−33	32	Relegation to Divizia C

Updated to match(es) played on 30 June 1998. Source: romaniansoccer.ro (in Romanian)
Rules for classification: 1) Points; 2) Head-to-head points; 3) Head-to-head goal difference; 4) Head-to-head goals scored; 5) Head-to-head away goals scored; 6) Goal difference; 7) Goals scored.
(C) Champions; (P) Promoted; (R) Relegated

== Promotion play-off ==
The 2nd-placed teams of the Divizia B played a match to decide the third team promoted to Divizia A. The match was played on neutral ground, on the Nitramonia Stadium in Făgăraș, Brașov County.

30 May 1998	FC Onești	2–1 (a.e.t.)	Electroputere Craiova	Făgăraș
14:00 EEST (UTC+3)	Bîrsan 80'; Iriza 95'	Report	Șoavă 61'	Stadium: Nitramonia; Attendance: 4,500; Referee: Marcel Lică (Constanța)

== Top scorers ==
16 goals

- (Romania) Daniel Bona (Precizia Săcele)

14 goals

- (Romania) Daniel Costescu (Poiana Câmpina)

9 goals

- (Romania) Ionuț Savu (Rocar București)

7 goals

- (Romania) Ionuț Badea (Dacia Pitești)
- (Romania) Gigi Gorga (Metrom Brașov)
- (Romania) Mugurel Buga (FC Brașov)

6 goals

- (Romania) Cristian Dicu (Midia Năvodari)
- (Romania) Marius Păcurar (Corvinul Hunedoara)

5 goals

- (Romania) Ciprian Danciu (Baia Mare)
- (Romania) Mihai Ilie (ARO Câmpulung)
- (Romania) Ionuț Bădescu (ARO Câmpulung)
- (Romania) Marius Diță (Dacia Pitești)
- (Romania) Tihamer Török (Nitramonia Făgăraș)
- (Romania) Eusebiu Tudor (Midia Năvodari)
- (Romania) Mircea Oprea (Apulum Alba Iulia)

== See also ==
- 1997–98 Divizia A
- 1997–98 Divizia C
- 1997–98 Divizia D
- 1997–98 Cupa României
