= 1999–2000 FC Onești season =

FC Onești
1999–2000 season
- Stadium: Stadionul FC Onești
- Divizia A: 16th (relegated)
- Cupa României: First round proper

The 1999–2000 FC Onești season was the club's sixth season in existence and the club's second consecutive season in the top flight of Romanian football. In addition to the domestic league, FC Onești participated in this season's edition of the Cupa României.

== Competitions ==
=== Overall record ===
Competition	First match	Last match	Starting round	Final position	Record							
Competition	First match	Last match	Starting round	Final position	Pld	W	D	L	GF	GA	GD	Win %
Divizia A	24 July 1999	10 May 2000	Matchday 1	16th	34	9	3	22	37	92	−55	26.47
Cupa României	22 September 1999		First round proper	First round proper	1	0	0	1	1	4	−3	0.00
Total					35	9	3	23	38	96	−58	25.71

Source: Competitions

=== Divizia A ===
==== League table ====
Pos	Team	Pld	W	D	L	GF	GA	GD	Pts	Qualification or relegation
14	Brașov	34	14	4	16	53	43	+10	46 (Note: CRA 1–0 BRA; BRA 0–1 CRA)	
15	Farul Constanța (R)	34	12	8	14	38	45	−7	44	Relegation to Divizia B
16	FC Onești (R)	34	9	3	22	37	92	−55	30	Relegation to Divizia B
17	CSM Reșița (R)	34	5	8	21	35	73	−38	23	Relegation to Divizia B
18	Extensiv Craiova (R)	34	4	5	25	26	66	−40	17	Relegation to Divizia B

Source: LT (in Romanian)
Rules for classification: 1) points; 2) head-to-head points; 3) head-to-head goal difference; 4) head-to-head goals scored; 5) goal difference; 6) number of goals scored.
(R) Relegated

==== Results summary ====
Overall								Home						Away					
Pld	W	D	L	GF	GA	GD	Pts	W	D	L	GF	GA	GD	W	D	L	GF	GA	GD
34	9	3	22	37	92	−55	30	9	2	6	29	32	−3	0	1	16	8	60	−52

==== Results by round ====
Round	1	2	3	4	5	6	7	8	9	10	11	12	13	14	15	16	17	18	19	20
Ground	H	A	H	A	H	A	H	A	H	A	H	A	H	A	H	H	A	A	H	A
Result	W	L	W	L	D	L	L	L	W	D	W	L	W	L	W	L	L	L	D	L
Position	5	6	5	8	10	13	15	15	14	13	13	13	10	12	10	12	13	13	15	16

A = Away; H = Home; W = Win; D = Draw; L = Loss

==== Matches ====
24 July 1999 1	FC Onești	2–1	CSM Reșița
--:-- EEST (UTC+3)

30 July 1999 2	FC Universitatea Craiova	1–0	FC Onești
--:-- EEST (UTC+3)

4 August 1999 3	FC Onești	1–0	Astra Ploieşti
--:-- EEST (UTC+3)

7 August 1999 4	FCM Bacău	3–0	FC Onești
--:-- EEST (UTC+3)

14 August 1999 5	FC Onești	1–1	Ceahlăul Piatra Neamt
--:-- EEST (UTC+3)

21 August 1999 6	AFC Steaua București	3–0	FC Onești
--:-- EEST (UTC+3)

28 August 1999 7	FC Onești	1–2	Argeș Pitești
--:-- EEST (UTC+3)

11 September 1999 8	Oţelul Galaţi	2–1	FC Onești
--:-- EEST (UTC+3)

17 September 1999 9	FC Onești	3–2	Gloria Bistrița
--:-- EEST (UTC+3)

25 September 1999 10	Extensiv Craiova	0–0	FC Onești
--:-- EEST (UTC+3)

2 October 1999 11	FC Onești	5–1	Petrolul Ploieşti
--:-- EEST (UTC+3)

16 October 1999 12	AS Rocar București	5–1	FC Onești
--:-- EEST (UTC+3)

23 October 1999 13	FC Onești	3–2	FC Brașov
--:-- EEST (UTC+3)

27 October 1999 14	Rapid București	3–1	FC Onești
--:-- EEST (UTC+3)

30 October 1999 15	FC Onești	1–0	National Bucureşti
--:-- EEST (UTC+3)

7 November 1999 16	FC Onești	2–4	Dinamo Bucureşti
--:-- EET (UTC+2)

12 November 1999 17	Farul Constanța	3–1	FC Onești
--:-- EET (UTC+2)

20 November 1999 18	CSM Reșița	6–1	FC Onești
--:-- EET (UTC+2)

27 November 1999 19	FC Onești	0–0	FC Universitatea Craiova
--:-- EET (UTC+2)

4 December 1999 20	Astra Ploieşti	5–0	FC Onești
--:-- EET (UTC+2)

=== Cupa României ===
22 September 1999 First round	FC Brașov	4–1	FC Onești
--:-- EEST (UTC+3)
