= FC Dinamo București 4–5 Foresta Suceava =

- Event: 2000–01 Divizia A, round 13
Dinamo București	Foresta Suceava
4	5
- Date: 11 November 2000
- Venue: Stadionul Dinamo, Bucharest
- Referee: Marian Salomir (Romania)
- Attendance: 6,000
- Weather: Fine

FC Dinamo București 4–5 Foresta Suceava was a football match played on 11 November 2000 at Stadionul Dinamo in Bucharest, in the 13th round of the 2000–01 Divizia A. Dinamo, the reigning champions, were at home to newly promoted Foresta Suceava, a side Ziarul de Iași described as "one of the modest teams of the championship". Two minutes into the second half Dinamo were 4–0 up. Foresta then scored five times from the 62nd minute onwards to win 5–4, Robert Niță getting the winner in the last minute. Gazeta Sporturilor called it "the most spectacular turnaround in the Romanian championship", and Ziarul de Iași wrote that nothing comparable had happened in the 67-year history of the Divizia A. The game was shown live on Acasă TV, and the Romanian sports press has come back to it many times since.

== Background ==
Dinamo, coached by Cornel Dinu, had won the 1999–2000 Divizia A and their side included several internationals. Going into this match, though, they were fifth in the table with 18 points, having lost 3–1 at Gloria Bistrița in their previous game. (Note: League positions and points calculated from the round-by-round results listed by RSSSF.) Foresta, a club from Fălticeni that played in Suceava under the name Foresta Suceava, had come up as winners of Series 1 of the 1999–2000 Divizia B. They were ninth, a point behind Dinamo, after a 3–1 home win over Petrolul Ploiești.

Niță had joined Foresta from Steaua București before the season. By his own account, Steaua coach Victor Pițurcă had sent him to Suceava after coming to an arrangement with the newly promoted club. Three days before the match, Niță told a television interviewer: "I think we would make history if we beat Dinamo on Saturday."

Ionuț Lupescu, back at Dinamo after a spell with Bursaspor, did not arrive until the evening before the game. He later said the squad was still affected by the death of their teammate Cătălin Hîldan earlier that autumn. Lupescu started the match, but the captain's armband stayed with Adrian Mihalcea.

== Match ==
=== Summary ===
The weather was fine and the pitch in good condition. The game drew a crowd of 6,000 and was broadcast live by Acasă TV.

Dinamo went ahead after 11 minutes, when Tinel Petre scored from a scramble in the Foresta area following a Vlăduț Munteanu corner. Seven minutes later Foresta defender Cristian Șchiopu, trying to clear, hit his own crossbar. Petre had a hand in each of Dinamo's next three goals. In the 28th minute his pass found Mihalcea by way of Lupescu, and Mihalcea scored from six metres. The television report said he dedicated the goal to Hîldan. Two minutes before half-time Petre set up Iulian Tameș on the edge of the penalty area for 3–0, and in the 47th minute Marius Niculae headed in Petre's cross for 4–0.

Foresta had changed goalkeepers at half-time, with Ciubotaru replacing Eugen Nae, and two minutes after his goal Niculae made way for Florin Răducioiu. Foresta's first goal came in the 62nd minute: a clearance by Dinamo goalkeeper Ștefan Preda fell to Adrian Beldiman, and Niță converted his cross. Shortly afterwards, according to Lupescu, Dinamo had a penalty appeal turned down by referee Marian Salomir. Gheorghe Mihali went off injured in the 64th minute and was replaced by Florin Cernat, with Dinu moving Lupescu to sweeper. Four minutes later Vlăduț Munteanu hit the post from six metres.

Marius Păcurar made it 4–2 in the 73rd minute, getting in front of Valentin Năstase to take a pass from Dumitru Ene and running on into the penalty area to score. Two minutes later Păcurar put Mihai Botan clean through on Preda, and Botan scored with a powerful shot. In the 82nd minute an identical move brought Botan his second goal and the equaliser. Then, in the final minute, Lupescu lost the ball to Botan, who found Niță. Niță ran from the halfway line and, seeing Preda off his line, lobbed the ball into the top corner.

Dinamo had 14 shots (10 on target) to Foresta's 8 (6 on target), and 12 corners to Foresta's 1. In the player ratings published by Gazeta Sporturilor, Botan and Niță came out top with 7.5 each. The result took Foresta up to sixth and dropped Dinamo to eighth.

=== Details ===
11 November 2000

Dinamo București	4–5	Foresta Suceava
T. Petre 11'; Mihalcea 28'; Tameș 43'; M. Niculae 47'	(Note: Goal times follow the Gazeta Sporturilor match report. RSSSF gives 12', 29', 43', and 47' for Dinamo, and 62' and 89' (Niță), 71' (Păcurar), and 73' and 82' (Botan) for Foresta.)	62', 90' Niță; 73' Păcurar; 75', 82' Botan

Stadionul Dinamo, Bucharest
Attendance: 6,000
Referee: Marian Salomir (Romania)

Dinamo București:

- 1 Ștefan Preda (GK)
- 16 Bogdan Onuț
- 6 Gheorghe Mihali (substituted off) 64'
- 4 Valentin Năstase
- 2 Tinel Petre (yellow card) 66'
- 7 Mugur Bolohan
- 24 Ionuț Lupescu
- 25 Iulian Tameș
- 15 Vlăduț Munteanu
- 9 Adrian Mihalcea (c) (substituted off) 80'
- 10 Marius Niculae (substituted off) 49'

Substitutes:

- 14 Florin Cernat (substituted on) 64'
- 17 Florin Răducioiu (substituted on) 49'
- 19 Claudiu Drăgan (substituted on) 80'
- 12 Florin Tene
- 21 Sorin Iodi
- 18 Cristian Vlad

Manager: Cornel Dinu

Foresta Suceava:

- 23 Eugen Nae (GK) (substituted off) 46'
- 5 Cristian Șchiopu (yellow card) 79'
- 6 Ovidiu Ciobanu (c)
- 14 Daniel Munteanu
- 20 Adrian Beldiman (substituted off) 71'
- 19 Mihai Botan
- 10 Dumitru Ene
- 8 Sergiu Brujan
- 11 Dorin Semeghin (substituted off) 49'
- 7 Marius Păcurar
- 13 Robert Niță

Substitutes:

- 22 Ciubotaru (GK) (substituted on) 46'
- 18 Dumitru Gavrilescu (substituted on) 49'
- 16 Silviu Buzea (substituted on) 71'
- 4 Dorin Goian
- 15 Alin Nicola
- 17 Éric Fanis

Manager: Marin Barbu

Match officials

- Referee: Marian Salomir (Cluj)
- Assistant referees: Marius Beudeanu (Brașov), Marcel Savaniu (Satu Mare)
- Fourth official: Aurel Simion (Pitești)
- Match observers: Mircea Dridea (Ploiești), Mircea Axente (Arad)

Statistics
Statistic	Dinamo	Foresta
Shots	14	8
Shots on target	10	6
Corner kicks	12	1
Yellow cards	1	1

== Aftermath ==
Dinu told the post-match press conference that Dinamo had played well for 60 to 70 minutes, and that "these are results that happen once every few decades". Gazeta Sporturilor carried reactions on its front page. Former Dinamo forward Florea Dumitrache said he could not believe what he had seen, and Dănuț Lupu asked if someone was pulling his leg. Dorinel Munteanu's verdict was "that's football". Dumitru Dragomir, alluding to the national football pools, remarked that "at this rate, in a few years we will have the toughest Pronosport in the world", while the singer Ștefan Bănică Jr. said that at 4–0 he had been looking at the table to see whether Dinamo had the best attack.

According to Niță, Foresta owner Eugen Huțu left the stand in the 29th minute with his team 2–0 down, and coach Marin Barbu was sacked at half-time. The players, he said, celebrated afterwards in the dressing room with still water and lemons with sugar. Barbu later recalled that at half-time, with Foresta 3–0 down, the club president told him Huțu had decided to dismiss the whole team, and that he spent the break trying to "wake up" his players.

Niță said he received a US$4,000 win bonus. On the Dinamo side, Niculae, who had been taken for a doping test after being substituted, said he did not find out the final score until afterwards, when Mihalcea told him in the dressing room. Former Dinamo official Constantin Dănilescu recalled being certain at 4–3 that Dinamo would lose, and called it a defeat from 4–0 up that "happens once in a lifetime".

Dinamo finished the season as runners-up to Steaua and won the 2000–01 Cupa României, beating Rocar București 4–2 in the final. Niculae was the league's top scorer with 20 goals, and Niță finished joint third on 14. Foresta ended up 13th but were relegated after losing a play-off to FC Baia Mare on away goals. The club later moved back to Fălticeni and was excluded from the championship before the 2003–04 season, after which it took no further part in competitions.

== Legacy ==
Gazeta Sporturilor led its 13 November 2000 edition with the headline "KO istoric" ("Historic knockout"), describing the match as "the most spectacular turnaround in the Romanian championship" and adding that the score had been 4–0 until the 62nd minute. Three days after the game, Nicolae Grecu wrote in Ziarul de Iași that no such turnaround had happened in the 67-year history of the Divizia A. The match has been the subject of many retrospective articles since, including on its 20th anniversary.

In 2019 Dinamo were drawn against ACS Foresta Suceava, a later club of the same name, in the round of 16 of the Cupa României. Niță told Eurosport that the 2000 match had "entered the history of Romanian football". This time Dinamo won 4–0. In March 2020 Ciprian Anton, president of the Suceava County Football Association, announced that the two clubs had agreed to mark the 20th anniversary with a demonstration match in Suceava in May 2020, to be broadcast live by Pro X. The COVID-19 pandemic forced a postponement, and the autumn was put forward as a new date. According to Monitorul de Suceava, the game, which was to have featured the players of 2000 and had been set for 21 May 2020 at the Areni Stadium, was eventually cancelled because of the pandemic.

Romanian outlets have also brought up the match when reporting similar results abroad. In 2018, covering a 9–8 comeback from 2–7 in an FA Youth Cup match between Nuneaton Borough and Halesowen Town, Digi Sport recalled Dinamo–Foresta and wrote that it "will remain in the history of Romanian football". In December 2022 Sport.ro compared it with Derthona's 5–4 win over Fossano in Italy's Serie D, a match in which Derthona had also been 4–0 down until the 62nd minute.

== See also ==
- Comeback (sports)
- Charlton Athletic F.C. 7–6 Huddersfield Town A.F.C.
- Reading 5–7 Arsenal
- FC Barcelona 6–1 Paris Saint-Germain FC
- 2005 UEFA Champions League final
- 1954 FIFA World Cup final
