= 1994–95 Divizia B =

Divizia B
- Season: 1994–95
- Promoted: Selena Bacău; Politehnica Timișoara; Politehnica Iași
- Relegated: Flacăra Moreni; ICIM Brașov; Faur București; CFR Cluj; Acord Focșani; Phoenix Baia Mare; Callatis Mangalia; Armătura Zalău
- Top goalscorer: Narcis Răducan (18 goals)

The 1994–95 Divizia B was the 55th season of the second tier of the Romanian football league system.

The format has been maintained to two series, each of them having 18 teams. At the end of the season, the winners of the series promoted to Divizia A and the last two places from both series relegated to Divizia C. The teams which were ranked 2nd played a promotion/relegation play-off against teams ranked 15th and 16th in the Divizia A and teams ranked 15th and 16th in the Divizia B in both series, played a relegation/promotion play-off against the 2nd places from Divizia C.

== Team changes ==
=== To Divizia B ===
Promoted from Divizia C

- Cetatea Târgu Neamț
- Poiana Câmpina
- Dacia Pitești
- Unirea Dej

Relegated from Divizia A

- Politehnica Timișoara
- Dacia Unirea Brăila

=== From Divizia B ===
Relegated to Divizia C

- Foresta Fălticeni
- Metalul Bocșa
- Constructorul Iași
- Drobeta-Turnu Severin

Promoted to Divizia A

- Argeș Pitești
- Maramureș Baia Mare

=== Renamed teams ===
Gloria CFR Galați was renamed as Constant Galați.

Chimia Râmnicu Vâlcea was renamed as FC Râmnicu Vâlcea.

== League tables ==
=== Serie I ===
Pos	Team	Pld	W	D	L	GF	GA	GD	Pts	Promotion or relegation
1	Selena Bacău (C, P)	34	22	5	7	76	30	+46	71	Promotion to Divizia A
2	Dacia Unirea Brăila (Note: Dacia Unirea Brăila were deducted 8 points for trying to fix a match and were denied to promote in the first league.)	34	24	2	8	72	25	+47	66	Ineligible for promotion
3	Politehnica Iași (O, P)	34	17	7	10	59	35	+24	58	Qualification to promotion play-off
4	Cetatea Târgu Neamț	34	17	4	13	52	50	+2	55	
5	Bucovina Suceava	34	16	5	13	42	44	−2	53	
6	Dacia Pitești	34	16	3	15	67	55	+12	51	
7	Poiana Câmpina	34	16	2	16	56	53	+3	50	
8	Gloria Buzău	34	15	5	14	47	43	+4	50	
9	Steaua Mizil	34	14	6	14	46	47	−1	48	
10	Constant Galați	34	14	5	15	44	46	−2	47	
11	Rocar București	34	15	2	17	43	61	−18	47	
12	Metalul Plopeni	34	14	3	17	37	45	−8	45	
13	Portul Constanța	34	13	5	16	48	53	−5	44	
14	FC Râmnicu Vâlcea	34	13	5	16	40	44	−4	44	
15	Flacăra Moreni (R)	34	12	5	17	43	50	−7	41	Qualification to relegation play-off
16	Faur București (R)	34	11	8	15	45	51	−6	41	Qualification to relegation play-off
17	Acord Focșani (R)	34	11	5	18	44	60	−16	38	Relegation to Divizia C
18	Callatis Mangalia (R)	34	6	3	25	37	106	−69	21	Relegation to Divizia C

Source: romaniansoccer.ro (in Romanian)
Rules for classification: 1) Points; 2) Head-to-head points; 3) Head-to-head goal difference; 4) Head-to-head goals scored; 5) Head-to-head away goals scored; 6) Goal difference; 7) Goals scored.
(C) Champions; (O) Play-off winners; (P) Promoted; (R) Relegated

=== Serie II ===
Pos	Team	Pld	W	D	L	GF	GA	GD	Pts	Promotion or relegation
1	Politehnica Timișoara (C, P)	34	24	6	4	75	20	+55	78	Promotion to Divizia A
2	Corvinul Hunedoara	34	20	4	10	76	41	+35	64	Qualification to promotion play-off
3	CFR Timișoara	34	17	6	11	49	41	+8	57	
4	Tractorul Brașov	34	15	9	10	44	31	+13	54	
5	ASA Târgu Mureș	34	14	9	11	49	38	+11	51	
6	Unirea Alba Iulia	34	15	5	14	46	40	+6	50	
7	Jiul Petroșani	34	16	2	16	62	55	+7	50	
8	Metrom Brașov	34	16	2	16	40	43	−3	50	
9	Unirea Dej	34	15	4	15	51	49	+2	49	
10	Gloria Reșița	34	15	4	15	44	45	−1	49	
11	Gaz Metan Mediaș	34	15	4	15	48	42	+6	49	
12	Bihor Oradea	34	14	6	14	50	46	+4	48	
13	CSM Reșița	34	13	9	12	34	38	−4	48	
14	Jiul IELIF Craiova	34	14	5	15	45	52	−7	47	
15	ICIM Brașov (R)	34	13	4	17	35	38	−3	43	Qualification to relegation play-off
16	CFR Cluj (R)	34	10	7	17	49	67	−18	37	Qualification to relegation play-off
17	Phoenix Baia Mare (R)	34	8	8	18	20	57	−37	32	Relegation to Divizia C
18	Armătura Zalău (R)	34	2	6	26	19	93	−74	12	Relegation to Divizia C

Source: romaniansoccer.ro (in Romanian)
Rules for classification: 1) Points; 2) Head-to-head points; 3) Head-to-head goal difference; 4) Head-to-head goals scored; 5) Head-to-head away goals scored; 6) Goal difference; 7) Goals scored.
(C) Champions; (P) Promoted; (R) Relegated

== Promotion play-off ==
The 15th and 16th-placed teams of the Divizia A faced the 3rd and 2nd-placed teams of the Divizia B. The matches were played on neutral ground, the first one on the Municipal Stadium in Sfântu Gheorghe and the second one on the Tineretului Stadium in Brașov.

Team 1	Score	Team 2
Sportul Studențesc (Div. A)	1–0	(Div. B) Corvinul Hunedoara
Electroputere Craiova (Div. A)	2–2 (a.e.t.) (3–4 p)	(Div. B) Politehnica Iași

== Relegation play-off ==
The 15th and 16th-placed teams of the Divizia B faced the 2nd-placed teams of the Divizia C. The matches were played on neutral ground, the first one on the Municipal Stadium in Buzău, the second one on the Astra Stadium in Ploiești, the third one on the Electro-Precizia Stadium in Săcele and the last one on the Gloria Stadium in Bistrița.

Team 1	Score	Team 2
Faur București (Div. B)	0–1	(Div. C) Dunărea Călărași
ICIM Brașov (Div. B)	0–1	(Div. C) ARO Câmpulung
Flacăra Moreni (Div. B)	0–1	(Div. C) FC Onești
CFR Cluj (Div. B)	0–0 (a.e.t.) (1–4 p)	(Div. C) Olimpia Satu Mare

== Top scorers ==
18 goals

- (Romania) Narcis Răducan (Selena Bacău)

14 goals

- (Romania) Vasile Jercălău (Selena Bacău)
- (Romania) Marcel Băban (Politehnica Timișoara)

12 goals

- (Romania) Mugur Gușatu (Politehnica Timișoara)

10 goals

- (Romania) Daniel Baston (Constant Galați)
- (Romania) Lavi Hrib (Rocar București)
- (Romania) Romulus Gabor (Corvinul Hunedoara)
- (Romania) Iulian Florescu (Jiul IELIF Craiova)

9 goals

- (Romania) Cristian Coroian (CFR Cluj)
- (Romania) Marius Păcurar (Corvinul Hunedoara)

== See also ==
- 1994–95 Divizia A
