= Robert Niță =

Romanian footballer

Robert Niţă
Personal information
- Full name: Robert Ionel Niţă
- Date of birth: 2 April 1977 (age 49)
- Place of birth: Bucharest, Romania
- Height: 1.71 m (5 ft 7 1/2 in)
- Position: Striker

Youth career
- 1989–1997: Steaua București

Senior career*
Years	Team	Apps	(Gls)
1997–2000	Steaua București	5	(0)
1997–1998	→ Corvinul Hunedoara (loan)	13	(0)
1998	→ Cimentul Fieni (loan)	10	(7)
1998–1999	→ Oțelul Galați (loan)	19	(4)
2000	NC Foresta Suceava	15	(9)
2000–2004	Rapid București	79	(19)
2004	Hapoel Be'er Sheva	7	(2)
2004–2005	Gloria Bistriţa	7	(0)
2005–2006	Pandurii Târgu-Jiu	6	(1)
2007–2008	Rocar București	15	(2)
2008–2010	Viettel	20	(10)
Total		196	(54)

International career
	Romania U17	30	(12)
	Romania U19	9	(2)
- * Club domestic league appearances and goals

Robert Ionel Niţă (born 2 April 1977 in Bucharest) is a retired Romanian football player.

== Career ==
Robert Niţă was born in Bucharest, and his first club was Steaua București in Romania. He later joined Corvinul Hunedoara, Cimentul Fieni and Oțelul Galați where he was one of the best players in the team. In 1999, he returned to Steaua for a short period. Next signed with Foresta Suceava and scored 9 goals in 15 matches. On 11 November 2000 he scored twice, including the last-minute winner, in Foresta's 5–4 win at Dinamo București. In 2000, he came to Rapid București, season 2000–01 he finished 3rd place in the top scores classification with 14 goals (9 scored for Foresta Suceava) in Liga I. In 2004, he was bought by Israelian team Hapoel Be'er Sheva. Is next signed with Gloria Bistriţa and Pandurii Târgu-Jiu. In 2008, he joined Viettel from Vietnam and retired there.

== International career ==
Robert Niţă has played 30 times for the Romania U-17 and he scored 12 goals. He played also for Romania U-21 9 games and he scored 2 goals.

== Personal life ==
His son, Andreas, was also a professional footballer.

== Honours ==
Rapid București

- Divizia A: 2002–03
- Cupa României: 2001–02
- Supercupa României: 2002, 2003
