= 1993–94 Divizia C =

Third tier Romanian football league

Divizia C
- Season: 1993–94

The 1993–94 Divizia C was the 38th season of Liga III, the third tier of the Romanian football league system.

== Team changes ==
=== To Divizia C ===
Relegated from Divizia B

- Olt 90 Scornicești
- Unirea Slobozia
- Metalurgistul Cugir
- Olimpia Satu Mare

Promoted from Divizia D

- Rodchim Găești
- Rapid Fetești
- Constructorul U Craiova
- Olimpia Salonta
- CPL Arad
- Conpref Constanța
- Petrolul Berca
- Rapid Miercurea Ciuc
- CFR Tepro Iași
- Petrolul Moinești
- Minerul Gura Humorului
- Jiul Rovinari
- Petrolul Videle
- Parângul Lonea
- Viscofil București
- Sfântu Gheorghe

=== From Divizia C ===
Promoted to Divizia B

- Constructorul Iași
- Metalul Plopeni
- Gaz Metan Mediaș
- Phoenix Baia Mare

Relegated to Divizia D

- Unirea Codlea
- Sportul Municipal Vaslui
- CSM Borzești
- Textila Buhuși
- IMGB București
- Olimpia Râmnicu Sărat
- Chimia Brăila
- Dacia Lamirom Brăila
- Caromet Caransebeș
- Șoimii Compa Sibiu
- Electrica Fieni
- FC Caracal
- Metalul Aiud
- Minerul Cavnic
- Clujana Cluj-Napoca
- Ardudeana Ardud

=== Renamed teams ===
Mecanex Botoșani was renamed as Cozinda Botoșani.

Meconerg Onești was renamed as Electromecon Onești.

Sportul Călărași was renamed as Sportul AGROCONSID Călărași.

Rodchim Găești was renamed as Chimia Găești.

Laminorul Victoria Zalău was renamed as Laminorul Zalău.

ROVA Roșiori was renamed as Sporting Roșiori.

Rapid Fetești was renamed as Rapid Elcom Fetești.

Victoria Giurgiu was renamed as Acvila Giurgiu.

Unirea Tricolor Oltenița was renamed as Navol Unirea Oltenița.

Unirea Slobozia was renamed as ASA 93 Slobozia.

=== Other changes ===
Venus Lugoj merged with Minerul Motru, the first one being absorbed by the second one. The new entity was named as Minerul Venus Motru.

== League tables ==
=== Seria I ===
Pos	Team	Pld	W	D	L	GF	GA	GD	Pts	Qualification or relegation
1	Cetatea Târgu Neamț (C, P)	34	22	5	7	72	35	+37	49	Promotion to Divizia B
2	Petrolul Moinești	34	20	2	12	57	34	+23	42	
3	Mureșul Toplița	34	17	3	14	74	44	+30	37	
4	Harghita Odorheiu Secuiesc	34	16	5	13	71	53	+18	37	
5	Melana Savinești	34	16	4	14	56	43	+13	36	
6	Sfântu Gheorghe	34	15	6	13	65	59	+6	36	
7	Electromecon Onești	34	14	7	13	76	45	+31	35	
8	CFR Tepro Iași	34	15	4	15	41	51	−10	34	
9	Minerul Gura Humorului	34	16	2	16	43	58	−15	34	
10	Vrancart Adjud	34	15	3	16	45	39	+6	33	
11	Cozinda Botoșani	34	16	1	17	51	63	−12	33	
12	Nitramonia Făgăraș	34	14	4	16	56	45	+11	32	
13	Cotidian Selena Bacău	34	13	5	16	57	50	+7	31	
14	Minerul 92 Comănești	34	12	7	15	32	61	−29	31	
15	CFR Pașcani	34	15	4	15	40	40	0	30 (Note: CFR Pașcani deducted 4 points.)	
16	ASA Agrojim Câmpulung Moldovenesc	34	13	3	18	35	80	−45	29	
17	Rapid Miercurea Ciuc (R)	34	12	4	18	41	55	−14	28	Relegation to Divizia D
18	FEPA 74 Bârlad (R)	34	7	7	20	25	82	−57	21	Relegation to Divizia D
19	Bucovina Rădăuți (Note: Bucovina Rădăuți was excluded from championship and all its results were canceled.) (D)	0	0	0	0	0	0	0	0	Excluded
20	Aerostar Bacău (Note: Aerostar Bacău withdrew from championship and all its results were canceled.) (D)	0	0	0	0	0	0	0	0	Withdrew

Source: romaniansoccer.ro
Rules for classification: 1) Points; 2) Goal difference; 3) Number of goals scored.
(C) Champions; (D) Disqualified; (P) Promoted; (R) Relegated

=== Seria II ===
Pos	Team	Pld	W	D	L	GF	GA	GD	Pts	Qualification or relegation
1	Poiana Câmpina (C, P)	36	21	9	6	62	25	+37	51	Promotion to Divizia B
2	Sportul AGROCONSID Călărași	36	21	8	7	71	39	+32	50	
3	Petrolul Berca	36	22	5	9	57	25	+32	41 (Note: Petrolul Berca and Minerul Filipeștii de Pădure deducted 8 points.)	
4	Petrolul Ianca	36	20	1	15	60	53	+7	41	
5	Prahova Ploiești	36	17	5	14	57	44	+13	39	
6	Conpref Constanța	36	18	2	16	57	46	+11	38	
7	Danubiana București	36	18	2	16	59	50	+9	38	
8	Acvila Giurgiu	36	17	2	17	55	56	−1	36	
9	Cimentul Medgidia	36	14	7	15	58	48	+10	35	
10	Viscofil București	36	15	4	17	51	48	+3	34	
11	Constructorul Feroviar București	36	14	6	16	48	48	0	34	
12	Astra Ploiești	36	14	6	16	40	47	−7	34	
13	Rapid Elcom Fetești	36	16	4	16	44	53	−9	34 (Note: Rapid Elcom Fetești deducted 2 points.)	
14	Sportul Studențesc Agrariana Braniștea	36	15	4	17	46	69	−23	33 (Note: Sportul Studențesc Agrariana Braniștea deducted 1 points.)	
15	Navol Unirea Oltenița	36	14	5	17	46	60	−14	33	
16	Juventus Colentina București	36	13	7	16	54	48	+6	33	
17	Minerul Filipeștii de Pădure (R)	36	14	6	16	54	64	−10	26	Relegation to Divizia D
18	Glina București (R)	36	9	3	24	36	71	−35	21	Relegation to Divizia D
19	ASA 93 Slobozia (R)	36	5	4	27	25	92	−67	14	Relegation to Divizia D
20	Delta Tulcea (Note: Delta Tulcea was excluded from championship and all its results were canceled.) (D)	0	0	0	0	0	0	0	0	Excluded

Source: romaniansoccer.ro
Rules for classification: 1) Points; 2) Goal difference; 3) Number of goals scored.
(C) Champions; (D) Disqualified; (P) Promoted; (R) Relegated

=== Seria III ===
Pos	Team	Pld	W	D	L	GF	GA	GD	Pts	Qualification or relegation
1	Dacia Pitești (C, P)	38	26	3	9	73	34	+39	55	Promotion to Divizia B
2	Petrolul Stoina	35	21	2	12	68	38	+30	44	
3	Minerul Mătăsari	38	20	4	14	69	47	+22	44	
4	Minerul Uricani	38	19	5	14	72	54	+18	43	
5	Minerul Lupeni	38	20	1	17	65	54	+11	41	
6	Parângul Lonea	38	20	0	18	80	58	+22	40	
7	CS Târgoviște	38	18	4	16	71	51	+20	40	
8	Metalurgistul Cugir	38	19	1	18	77	60	+17	39	
9	Paroșeni Vulcan	38	17	5	16	52	47	+5	39	
10	Jiul Rovinari	38	17	4	17	55	51	+4	38	
11	Constructorul U Craiova	38	18	2	18	62	62	0	38	
12	Cimentul Fieni	38	17	3	18	71	58	+13	37	
13	Victoria Curtea de Argeș	38	18	0	20	55	56	−1	36	
14	Unirea Alexandria	38	15	6	17	49	60	−11	36	
15	Petrolul Videle	38	17	2	19	40	54	−14	36	
16	Metalurgistul Sadu	38	16	3	19	36	67	−31	35	
17	Olt 90 Scornicești (R)	38	14	4	20	41	74	−33	32	Relegation to Divizia D
18	Chimia Găești (R)	38	14	4	20	46	81	−35	32	Relegation to Divizia D
19	Sporting Roșiori (R)	38	12	5	21	42	81	−39	29	Relegation to Divizia D
20	Metalurgistul Slatina (R)	38	10	6	22	49	87	−38	26	Relegation to Divizia D

Source: romaniansoccer.ro
Rules for classification: 1) Points; 2) Goal difference; 3) Number of goals scored.
(C) Champions; (P) Promoted; (R) Relegated

=== Seria IV ===
Pos	Team	Pld	W	D	L	GF	GA	GD	Pts	Qualification or relegation
1	Unirea Dej (C, P)	38	24	6	8	99	27	+72	54	Promotion to Divizia B
2	Minerul Venus Motru	38	19	4	15	85	44	+41	42	
3	Avântul Reghin	38	18	5	15	64	44	+20	41	
4	Vulturii Lugoj	38	18	4	16	68	47	+21	40	
5	Laminorul Zalău	38	17	6	15	56	41	+15	40	
6	Olimpia Salonta	38	18	4	16	52	48	+4	40	
7	Aris Arad	38	20	0	18	54	56	−2	40	
8	Olimpia Satu Mare	38	18	3	17	53	53	0	39	
9	Minerul Anina	38	17	4	17	61	60	+1	38	
10	Minerul Cavnic	38	18	2	18	52	63	−11	38	
11	Astra Arad	38	17	4	17	37	52	−15	38	
12	Motorul Arad	38	18	2	18	56	74	−18	38	
13	UM Timișoara	38	16	5	17	53	57	−4	37	
14	Arsenal Reșița	38	17	3	18	50	55	−5	37	
15	CPL Arad	38	15	7	16	40	52	−12	37	
16	Someșul Satu Mare	38	16	3	19	59	75	−16	35	
17	Electromureș Târgu Mureș (R)	38	16	2	20	54	69	−15	34	Relegation to Divizia D
18	Minerul Voivozi (R)	38	16	1	21	51	72	−21	33	Relegation to Divizia D
19	Victoria Carei (R)	38	13	6	19	44	67	−23	32	Relegation to Divizia D
20	Șoimii Lipova (R)	38	12	3	23	51	83	−32	27	Relegation to Divizia D

Source: romaniansoccer.ro
Rules for classification: 1) Points; 2) Goal difference; 3) Number of goals scored.
(C) Champions; (P) Promoted; (R) Relegated

== See also ==
- 1993–94 Divizia A
- 1993–94 Divizia B
- 1993–94 Cupa României
