= 1999–2000 CSM Reșița season =

CSM Reșița
1999–2000 season
- Stadium: Stadionul Mircea Chivu
- Divizia A: 17th (relegated)
- Cupa României: Quarter-finals

The 1999–2000 CSM Reșița season was the club's 74th season in existence and the club's second consecutive season in the top flight of Romanian football. In addition to the domestic league, CSM Reșița participated in this season's edition of the Cupa României.

== Competitions ==
=== Overall record ===
Competition	First match	Last match	Starting round	Final position	Record							
Competition	First match	Last match	Starting round	Final position	Pld	W	D	L	GF	GA	GD	Win %
Divizia A	24 July 1999	10 May 2000	Matchday 1	17th	34	5	8	21	35	73	−38	14.71
Cupa României	22 September 1999		First round proper	Quarter-finals	3	2	0	1	5	3	+2	66.67
Total					37	7	8	22	40	76	−36	18.92

Source: Competitions

=== Divizia A ===
==== League table ====
Pos	Team	Pld	W	D	L	GF	GA	GD	Pts	Qualification or relegation
14	Brașov	34	14	4	16	53	43	+10	46 (Note: CRA 1–0 BRA; BRA 0–1 CRA)	
15	Farul Constanța (R)	34	12	8	14	38	45	−7	44	Relegation to Divizia B
16	FC Onești (R)	34	9	3	22	37	92	−55	30	Relegation to Divizia B
17	CSM Reșița (R)	34	5	8	21	35	73	−38	23	Relegation to Divizia B
18	Extensiv Craiova (R)	34	4	5	25	26	66	−40	17	Relegation to Divizia B

Source: LT (in Romanian)
Rules for classification: 1) points; 2) head-to-head points; 3) head-to-head goal difference; 4) head-to-head goals scored; 5) goal difference; 6) number of goals scored.
(R) Relegated

==== Results summary ====
Overall								Home						Away					
Pld	W	D	L	GF	GA	GD	Pts	W	D	L	GF	GA	GD	W	D	L	GF	GA	GD
34	5	8	21	35	73	−38	23	4	6	7	21	26	−5	1	2	14	14	47	−33

==== Results by round ====
Round	1	2	3	4	5	6	7	8	9	10	11	12	13	14	15	16	17	18	19	20	21	22	23	24	25	26	27	28	29	30	31	32	33	34
Ground	A	H	H	A	H	A	H	A	H	A	H	A	H	A	H	A	H	H	A	A	H	A	H	A	H	A	H	A	H	A	H	A	H	A
Result	L	D	L	D	L	L	L	L	D	W	D	L	D	L	W	L	W	W	L	L	D	L	L	L	W	D	L	L	D	L	L	L	L	L
Position	13	15	18	17	18	18	18	18	18	17	18	18	18	18	17	18	17	17	17	17	17	17	17	17	17	17	17	17	17	17	17	17	17	17

A = Away; H = Home; W = Win; D = Draw; L = Loss

==== Matches ====
24 July 1999 1	FC Onești	2–1	CSM Reșița
--:-- EEST (UTC+3)

30 July 1999 2	CSM Reșița	1–1	Farul Constanța
--:-- EEST (UTC+3)

4 August 1999 3	CSM Reșița	0–6	Dinamo Bucureşti
--:-- EEST (UTC+3)

7 August 1999 4	FC Universitatea Craiova	2–2	CSM Reșița
--:-- EEST (UTC+3)

14 August 1999 5	CSM Reșița	2–5	Astra Ploieşti
--:-- EEST (UTC+3)

21 August 1999 6	FCM Bacău	1–0	CSM Reșița
--:-- EEST (UTC+3)

28 August 1999 7	CSM Reșița	1–3	Ceahlăul Piatra Neamt
--:-- EEST (UTC+3)

10 September 1999 8	AFC Steaua București	5–0	CSM Reșița
--:-- EEST (UTC+3)

17 September 1999 9	CSM Reșița	0–0	Argeș Pitești
--:-- EEST (UTC+3)

25 September 1999 10	Oţelul Galaţi	1–2	CSM Reșița
--:-- EEST (UTC+3)

2 October 1999 11	CSM Reșița	1–1	Gloria Bistrița
--:-- EEST (UTC+3)

16 October 1999 12	Extensiv Craiova	1–0	CSM Reșița
--:-- EEST (UTC+3)

22 October 1999 13	CSM Reșița	2–2	Petrolul Ploieşti
--:-- EEST (UTC+3)

27 October 1999 14	AS Rocar București	4–0	CSM Reșița
--:-- EEST (UTC+3)

30 October 1999 15	CSM Reșița	3–1	FC Brașov
--:-- EEST (UTC+3)

6 November 1999 16	Rapid Bucureşti	4–0	CSM Reșița
--:-- EET (UTC+2)

14 November 1999 17	CSM Reșița	1–0	National Bucureşti
--:-- EET (UTC+2)

20 November 1999 18	CSM Reșița	6–1	FC Onești
--:-- EET (UTC+2)

27 November 1999 19	Farul Constanța	3–1	CSM Reșița
--:-- EET (UTC+2)

4 December 1999 20	Dinamo Bucureşti	2–1	CSM Reșița
--:-- EET (UTC+2)

4 March 2000 21	CSM Reșița	0–0	FC Universitatea Craiova
--:-- EET (UTC+2)

11 March 2000 22	Astra Ploieşti	2–1	CSM Reșița
--:-- EET (UTC+2)

17 March 2000 23	CSM Reșița	1–2	FCM Bacău
--:-- EET (UTC+2)

22 March 2000 24	Ceahlăul Piatra Neamt	4–2	CSM Reșița
--:-- EET (UTC+2)

26 March 2000 25	CSM Reșița	2–0	AFC Steaua București
--:-- EET (UTC+2)

1 April 2000 26	Argeș Pitești	1–1	CSM Reșița
--:-- EEST (UTC+3)

5 April 2000 27	CSM Reșița	1–2	Oţelul Galaţi
--:-- EEST (UTC+3)

8 April 2000 28	Gloria Bistrița	2–0	CSM Reșița
--:-- EEST (UTC+3)

15 April 2000 29	CSM Reșița	0–0	Extensiv Craiova
--:-- EEST (UTC+3)

22 April 2000 30	Petrolul Ploieşti	4–2	CSM Reșița
--:-- EEST (UTC+3)

29 April 2000 31	CSM Reșița	0–1	AS Rocar București
--:-- EEST (UTC+3)

3 May 2000 32	FC Brașov	4–0	CSM Reșița
--:-- EEST (UTC+3)

6 May 2000 33	CSM Reșița	0–1	Rapid Bucureşti
--:-- EEST (UTC+3)

10 May 2000 34	National Bucureşti	5–1	CSM Reșița
--:-- EEST (UTC+3)

=== Cupa României ===
	v
--:-- EEST (UTC+3)
