= 1994–95 Divizia C =

Third tier Romanian football league

Divizia C
- Season: 1994–95

The 1994–95 Divizia C was the 39th season of Liga III, the third tier of the Romanian football league system.

== Team changes ==
=== To Divizia C ===
Relegated from Divizia B

- Foresta Fălticeni
- Constructorul Iași
- Metalul Bocșa
- Drobeta-Turnu Severin

Promoted from Divizia D

- ARO Câmpulung
- Sticla Arieșul Turda
- Minaur Zlatna
- CFR Constanța
- Romgal Romanu
- Steaua Minerul Vatra Dornei
- Petrolistul Boldești
- Aversa București
- SM Drăgănești-Olt
- Chimica Târnaveni
- Vega Caransebeș
- Viitorul Darcadia Coltău
- Petrolul Țicleni
- Minerul Sărmășag
- Minerul Berbești
- Abatorul Slobozia

=== From Divizia C ===
Promoted to Divizia B

- Cetatea Târgu Neamț
- Poiana Câmpina
- Dacia Pitești
- Unirea Dej

Relegated to Divizia D

- Rapid Miercurea Ciuc
- FEPA 74 Bârlad
- Bucovina Rădăuți
- Aerostar Bacău
- Minerul Filipeștii de Pădure
- Glina București
- ASA 93 Slobozia
- Delta Tulcea
- Olt 90 Scornicești
- Chimia Găești
- Sporting Roșiori
- Metalurgistul Slatina
- Electromureș Târgu Mureș
- Minerul Voivozi
- Victoria Carei
- Șoimii Lipova

=== Renamed teams ===
Rapid Elcom Fetești was renamed Rapid Fetești.

Sportul Agroconsid Călărași was renamed Dunărea Călărași.

Jiul Rovinari was renamed Mine-RAL Roșia Rovinari.

CFR Constanța was renamed Petrochimistul CFR Constanța.

CS Târgoviște was renamed Oțelul Târgoviște.

Conpref Constanța was renamed Șantierul Naval Constanța.

Viitorul Darcadia Coltău was renamed AS Sighetu Marmației.

=== Other changes ===
Constructorul Iași and Viitorul Hârlău merged, the first one being absorbed by the second one. The new entity was named as Viitorul 94 Hârlău.

Electromecon Onești merged with CSM Borzești to form FC Onești.

The partnership between Unirea Tricolor București and Navol Oltenița was cancelled. The team returned from Oltenița to Bucharest and reverted to its former name, Unirea Tricolor București.

Vega Caransebeș and Mureșul Deva merged, the first one being absorbed by the second one. The new entity was named as Vega Deva.

Aris Arad and Astra Arad merged, the first one being absorbed by the second one. The new entity was named as FC Arad.

West Petrom Pecica receive the vacant place resulted due to the merger between Astra Arad and Aris Arad.

Oașul Negrești-Oaș took the place of Someșul Satu Mare.

== League tables ==
=== Seria I ===
Pos	Team	Pld	W	D	L	GF	GA	GD	Pts	Qualification or relegation
1	Foresta Fălticeni (C, P)	32	27	1	4	91	21	+70	82	Promotion to Divizia B
2	FC Onești	32	24	3	5	84	27	+57	75	Qualification to promotion play-off
3	Nitramonia Făgăraș	32	18	3	11	51	35	+16	57	
4	Petrolul Ianca	32	17	5	10	45	35	+10	56	
5	Melana Savinești	32	17	2	13	71	45	+26	53	
6	Petrolul Moinești	32	16	5	11	47	32	+15	53	
7	Mureșul Toplița	32	15	2	15	60	45	+15	47	
8	Vrancart Adjud	32	14	3	15	53	55	−2	45	
9	CFR Pașcani	32	14	3	15	43	51	−8	45	
10	Sfântu Gheorghe	32	14	1	17	61	53	+8	43	
11	Harghita Odorheiu Secuiesc	32	13	2	17	51	54	−3	41	
12	Minerul 92 Comănești	32	11	3	18	31	54	−23	36	
13	Cotidian Selena Bacău	32	11	1	20	37	57	−20	34	
14	Romgal Romanu	32	9	6	17	28	59	−31	33	
15	CFR Tepro Iași	32	8	8	16	35	64	−29	32	
16	Steaua Minerul Vatra Dornei	32	10	2	20	38	82	−44	32	
17	Viitorul 94 Hârlău (R)	32	7	4	21	32	89	−57	25	Relegation to Divizia D
18	Minerul Gura Humorului (Note: Minerul Gura Humorului, ASA Agrojim Câmpulung Moldovenesc and Cozinda Botoșani were excluded from championship and all their results were canceled.) (D)	0	0	0	0	0	0	0	0	Excluded
19	ASA Agrojim Câmpulung Moldovenesc (D)	0	0	0	0	0	0	0	0	Excluded
20	Cozinda Botoșani (D)	0	0	0	0	0	0	0	0	Excluded

Source: romaniansoccer.ro
Rules for classification: 1) Points; 2) Goal difference; 3) Number of goals scored.
(C) Champions; (D) Disqualified; (P) Promoted; (R) Relegated

=== Seria II ===
Pos	Team	Pld	W	D	L	GF	GA	GD	Pts	Qualification or relegation
1	Oțelul Târgoviște (C, P)	36	25	5	6	80	29	+51	80	Promotion to Divizia B
2	Dunărea Călărași (P)	36	22	6	8	75	37	+38	72	Qualification to promotion play-off
3	Astra Ploiești	36	21	3	12	68	35	+33	66	
4	Constructorul Feroviar București	36	20	5	11	59	40	+19	65	
5	Danubiana București	36	20	4	12	63	40	+23	64	
6	Cimentul Fieni	36	17	5	14	82	56	+26	56	
7	Acvila Giurgiu	36	16	3	17	68	63	+5	51	
8	Petrochimistul CFR Constanța	36	15	5	16	45	57	−12	50	
9	Sportul Studențesc Agrariana Braniștea	36	16	2	18	40	69	−29	50	
10	Petrolul Berca	36	15	3	18	50	58	−8	48	
11	Petrolistul Boldești	36	14	5	17	56	53	+3	47	
12	Cimentul Medgidia	36	14	5	17	48	56	−8	47	
13	Juventus Colentina Bucureşti	36	14	5	17	47	67	−20	47	
14	Viscofil București	36	14	5	17	39	60	−21	47	
15	Aversa București	36	14	4	18	62	66	−4	46	
16	Șantierul Naval Constanța	36	14	4	18	41	55	−14	46	
17	Abatorul Slobozia (R)	36	14	2	20	49	65	−16	44	Relegation to Divizia D
18	Prahova Ploiești (R)	36	13	3	20	48	55	−7	42	Relegation to Divizia D
19	Unirea Tricolor București (R)	36	4	6	26	34	93	−59	18	Relegation to Divizia D
20	Rapid Fetești (Note: Rapid Fetești was excluded from championship and all its results were canceled.) (D)	0	0	0	0	0	0	0	0	Excluded

Source: romaniansoccer.ro
Rules for classification: 1) Points; 2) Goal difference; 3) Number of goals scored.
(C) Champions; (D) Disqualified; (P) Promoted; (R) Relegated

=== Seria III ===
Pos	Team	Pld	W	D	L	GF	GA	GD	Pts	Qualification or relegation
1	Minerul Motru (C, P)	38	25	4	9	85	36	+49	79	Promotion to Divizia B
2	ARO Câmpulung (P)	38	25	3	10	80	29	+51	78	Qualification to promotion play-off
3	Petrolul Stoina	38	21	1	16	70	55	+15	64	
4	Drobeta-Turnu Severin	38	20	4	14	61	53	+8	64	
5	Vega Deva	38	18	4	16	82	51	+31	58	
6	Minerul Mătăsari	38	18	4	16	57	43	+14	58	
7	Unirea Alexandria	38	18	4	16	54	55	−1	58	
8	Minerul Anina	38	18	3	17	61	52	+9	57	
9	UM Timișoara	38	18	3	17	65	60	+5	57	
10	Mine-RAL Roșia Rovinari	38	17	6	15	45	47	−2	57	
11	Constructorul Craiova	38	18	2	18	67	55	+12	56	
12	Petrolul Videle	38	18	2	18	51	57	−6	56	
13	Petrolul Țicleni	38	18	2	18	54	69	−15	56	
14	Vulturii Lugoj	38	16	6	16	55	49	+6	54	
15	Metalul Bocșa	38	16	6	16	52	69	−17	54	
16	Metalurgistul Sadu	38	17	2	19	47	44	+3	53	
17	Minerul Berbești (R)	38	17	2	19	47	44	+3	53	Relegation to Divizia D
18	Victoria Curtea de Argeș (R)	38	15	5	18	57	60	−3	50	Relegation to Divizia D
19	Arsenal Reșița (R)	38	7	5	26	37	92	−55	26	Relegation to Divizia D
20	SM Drăgănești-Olt (R)	38	3	6	29	29	126	−97	15	Relegation to Divizia D

Source: romaniansoccer.ro
Rules for classification: 1) Points; 2) Goal difference; 3) Number of goals scored.
(C) Champions; (P) Promoted; (R) Relegated

=== Seria IV ===
Pos	Team	Pld	W	D	L	GF	GA	GD	Pts	Qualification or relegation
1	Minaur Zlatna (C, P)	38	28	2	8	112	30	+82	86	Promotion to Divizia B
2	Olimpia Satu Mare (P)	38	24	2	12	91	51	+40	74	Qualification to promotion play-off
3	Sighetu Marmației	38	23	4	11	75	31	+44	73	
4	Parângul Lonea	38	20	4	14	84	51	+33	64	
5	Chimica Târnaveni	38	19	4	15	68	53	+15	61	
6	Minerul Uricani	38	19	2	17	69	68	+1	59	
7	Metalurgistul Cugir	38	19	1	18	61	61	0	58	
8	Laminorul Zalău	38	18	1	19	58	56	+2	55	
9	Minerul Lupeni	38	18	1	19	67	70	−3	55	
10	Motorul Arad	38	17	3	18	64	58	+6	54	
11	FC Arad	38	17	3	18	61	71	−10	54	
12	Olimpia Salonta	38	17	3	18	44	53	−9	52 (Note: Olimpia Salonta deducted 2 points.)	
13	Paroșeni Vulcan	38	18	1	19	55	63	−8	51 (Note: Paroșeni Vulcan and Minerul Sărmășag deducted 4 points.)	
14	West Petrom Pecica	38	16	3	19	53	85	−32	51	
15	Sticla Arieșul Turda	38	15	5	18	72	70	+2	50	
16	Minerul Cavnic	38	15	5	18	44	51	−7	50	
17	Minerul Sărmășag (R)	38	17	2	19	54	69	−15	49	Relegation to Divizia D
18	Oașul Negrești-Oaș (R)	38	15	3	20	48	88	−40	48	Relegation to Divizia D
19	CPL Arad (R)	38	10	3	25	49	81	−32	33	Relegation to Divizia D
20	Avântul Reghin (R)	38	8	2	28	35	102	−67	26	Relegation to Divizia D

Source: romaniansoccer.ro
Rules for classification: 1) Points; 2) Goal difference; 3) Number of goals scored.
(C) Champions; (P) Promoted; (R) Relegated

== See also ==
- 1994–95 Divizia A
- 1994–95 Divizia B
- 1994–95 Divizia D
- 1994–95 Cupa României
