= Stelian Badea =

Romanian footballer

Personal information
- Date of birth: 29 July 1958 (age 68)
- Place of birth: Uiești, Giurgiu County, Romania
- Position: Midfielder

Senior career*
Years	Team	Apps	(Gls)
1976–1978	I.O.R. București		
1978–1980	FC Olt Scornicești	23	
1980–1990	FC Argeș Pitești	244	(20)

Managerial career
- 1990–1992: Dacia Pitești
- 1992–1993: FC Argeș Pitești
- 1993–2000: Dacia Pitești
- 2000–2001: Cimentul Fieni
- 2001–2004: Internațional Pitești
- 2004–2005: Astra Ploiești
- 2005–2006: FC Național 2
- 2006–2007: Al Hilal Riyadh (youth team U20)
- 2010–2011: Al Riyadh
- * Club domestic league appearances and goals

Stelian Badea (born 29 July 1958), widely known as Stelică Badea, is a retired Romanian football midfielder.

== Biography ==
He was born in Bucșani and his first steps in football were under the guidance of coach Stere Popescu. He debuted at I.O.R. Bucharest and at twenty years he joined FC Olt Scornicești. In 1980, he arrived in Pitești, where he soon took the left midfield position. He played ten seasons at FC Argeș Pitești, playing 244 matches and scoring twenty goals.

== Coaching activity ==
- 1990–1992 Dacia Pitești, 3rd League
- 1992–1993 FC Argeș Pitești, 2nd League and 1st League
- 1993–2000 Dacia Pitești, 3rd League and 2nd League with 2 promovations in 2nd League and 1st League
- 2000–2001 Cimentul Fieni, 2nd League
- 2001–2004 Internațional Pitești, 2nd League
- 2004–2005 Astra Ploiești, 2nd League
- 2005–2006 FC Național II, 2nd League
- 2006–2007 AL Hilal Riyadh, Saudi Arabia
- 2010–2011 AL Riyadh, Saudi Arabia
