= Bănică Oprea =

Romanian footballer

Personal information
- Date of birth: 2 November 1967 (age 58)
- Place of birth: Medgidia, Romania
- Height: 1.72 m (5 ft 8 in)
- Position: Forward

Youth career
- 1979–1983: CSȘ Medgidia

Senior career*
Years	Team	Apps	(Gls)
1983–1987	IMUM Medgidia		
1987–1988	Metalul Mangalia		
1989–1998	Farul Constanța	241	(53)
1998–2001	Callatis Mangalia (Note: The statistics for the 1998–99 Divizia C season are unavailable.)	55	(11)
2001–2003	Aurora 23 August		
Total		296	(64)

Managerial career
- 2001–2006: Aurora 23 August
- 2006–2007: Callatis Mangalia
- 2013: Callatis Mangalia
- * Club domestic league appearances and goals

Bănică Oprea (born 2 November 1967) is a Romanian former footballer who played as a forward. After he ended his playing career he worked as a manager at clubs from the Romanian lower leagues.

== Playing career ==
Oprea was born on 2 November 1967 in Medgidia, Romania. He began playing junior-level football at the age of 12 in 1979 at CSȘ Medgidia. In 1983, he joined IMUM Medgidia, making his Divizia C debut under coach Vasile Enache in a 4–3 win over Voința Constanța. In 1987, he moved to neighboring club Metalul, reuniting with coach Enache. He helped them earn promotion to the second league at the end of the 1987–88 season. After playing for half a year in Divizia B for Metalul, Oprea moved to Farul Constanța, making his Divizia A debut on 16 April 1989 under coach Gheorghe Constantin in a 2–0 away loss to Sportul Studențesc București. He played three games in the 1995 Intertoto Cup, scoring a goal in a 2–1 win over Pogoń Szczecin. In the 1995–96 season, Oprea scored with a scissors kick in a 4–0 victory against Inter Sibiu, which was named the most spectacular goal of the season. In the following season, he netted a career-best 15 goals. Oprea played for Farul until 1998, totaling 241 matches with 53 goals in Divizia A. Subsequently, he joined Callatis Mangalia, helping them gain promotion from the third league to the second in the 1998–99 season. His last spell was as a player-coach at Aurora 23 August, where he helped them earn promotion from the fourth league to the third in the 2002–03 season, retiring afterwards.

== Managerial career ==
Oprea coached Aurora 23 August between 2001 and 2006, helping them earn promotion from the fourth league to the third in the 2002–03 season, while also being a player. Subsequently, he coached Callatis Mangalia. He also coached juniors and was an assistant coach at Farul Constanța.

== Honours ==
=== Player ===
Callatis Mangalia

- Divizia C: 1987–88, 1998–99

Aurora 23 August

- Divizia D: 2002–03

=== Manager ===
Aurora 23 August

- Divizia D: 2002–03
