= Cristian Bratu =

Romanian footballer

Personal information
- Full name: Cristian Nicolae Bratu
- Date of birth: 24 December 1977 (age 48)
- Place of birth: Piteşti, Argeş, Romania
- Height: 1.77 m (5 ft 10 in)
- Positions: Midfielder; forward

Senior career*
| Years | Team | Apps | (Gls) |
| 1997 | Dacia Pitești | 11 | (4) |
| 1998–2000 | Argeş Piteşti | 52 | (11) |
| 2000–2001 | Politehnica Timişoara | 30 | (10) |
| 2002 | CSM Reşiţa | 12 | (4) |
| 2002–2003 | Universitatea Craiova | 10 | (0) |
| 2004 | Hapoel Ironi Rishon LeZion | ? | (?) |
| 2005–2007 | Hapoel Jerusalem | ? | (?) |
| 2007–2008 | Dacia Mioveni | 30 | (6) |
| 2008–2010 | FC Politehnica Iași | 44 | (5) |
| 2010 | CSM Râmnicu Vâlcea | 6 | (1) |
| 2011 | Girom Albota | | |
| 2012–2013 | Dănuţ Coman Piteşti | | |
| 2013–2014 | Unirea Bascov | | |
| 2014–2015 | Argeș 1953 Piteşti | | |
- * Club domestic league appearances and goals

Cristian Nicolae Bratu (born 24 December 1977) is a Romanian former professional footballer who played as a midfielder and forward.
