= Altin Masati =

Albanian footballer

Personal information
- Place of birth: Albania
- Position: Defender

Senior career*
Years	Team	Apps	(Gls)
1992–1993	Tomori	28	(4)
1993–1994	Oțelul	22	(0)
1994–1998	Tractorul Brașov	96	
1998–2000	Oneşti	42	(2)
- * Club domestic league appearances and goals

Altin Masati is an Albanian retired footballer who played in his career as a left-sided defender for a series of Romanian clubs in the '90s.

== Club career ==
According to some sources he holds the record of the longest spell in Romanian football for a foreign player, having spent 10 years there. Also, a top of the foreign players with the most appearances in the Romanian Liga II rates him second with 96 games for Tractorul Brașov and FC Onești. In the 1999–2000 season he played in the Romanian Liga I with FC Onești, scoring a goal in Round 29 against Rocar București. Since 2000 he returned in Albania and opened a luxurious restaurant in the city of Berat.
