= 1994–95 Divizia D =

53rd season of the Liga IV, the fourth tier of the Romanian football league

Liga IV
- Season: 1994–95

The 1994–95 Divizia D was the 53rd season of the Liga IV, the fourth tier of the Romanian football league system. The champions of each county association play against one from a neighboring county in a promotion play-off played over two legs. A special table was made and teams with the best 16 aggregate results were promoted to the third league.

== County leagues ==
- Alba (AB)
- Arad (AR)
- Argeș (AG)
- Bacău (BC)
- Bihor (BH)
- Bistrița-Năsăud (BN)
- Botoșani (BT)
- Brașov (BV)
- Brăila (BR)
- Bucharest (B)
- Buzău (BZ)
- Caraș-Severin (CS)
- Călărași (CL)
- Cluj (CJ)
- Constanța (CT)
- Covasna (CV)
- Dâmbovița (DB)
- Dolj (DJ)
- Galați (GL)
- Giurgiu (GR)
- Gorj (GJ)
- Harghita (HR)
- Hunedoara (HD)
- Ialomița (IL)
- Iași (IS)
- Maramureș (MM)
- Mehedinți (MH)
- Mureș (MS)
- Neamț (NT)
- Olt (OT)
- Prahova (PH)
- Satu Mare (SM)
- Sălaj (SJ)
- Sibiu (SB)
- Suceava (SV)
- Teleorman (TR)
- Timiș (TM)
- Tulcea (TL)
- Vaslui (VS)
- Vâlcea (VL)
- Vrancea (VN)

== Promotion play-off ==
The matches were played on 4 and 11 June 1995.

Team 1	Agg.	Team 2	1st leg	2nd leg	
Minerul Ștei (BH)	14–3	(SJ) Mobila Șimleu Silvaniei	8–0	6–3	6–0 Pts.
Minerul Rodna (BN)	0–8	(CJ) IS Câmpia Turzii	0–3	0–5	0–6 Pts.
Electromureș Târgu Mureș (MS)	0–8	(SB) Șoimii Compa Sibiu	0–2	0–6	0–6 Pts.
Bradul Zagon (CV)	0–8	(BV) Precizia Săcele	0–2	0–6	0–6 Pts.
Cimentul Bicaz (NT)	1–6	(SV) Zimbrul Siret	1–3	0–3	0–6 Pts.
Petrolul Teleajen Ploiești (PH)	6–1	(IL) Agricultorul Sfântu Gheorghe	3–0	3–1	6–0 Pts.
Gloria Iris Cornești (DB)	6–1	(AG) Viitorul Costești	3–0	3–1	6–0 Pts.
Furnirul Deta (TM)	6–1	(AR) Telecom Arad	4–1	2–0	6–0 Pts.
FC Slatina (OT)	1–5	(VL) Petrolul Drăgășani	1–2	0–3	0–6 Pts.
Vulturul Gheorgheni (HR)	0–4	(BC) Letea Bacău	0–2	0–2	0–6 Pts.
Dacia 92 Grăniceri Satu Mare (SM)	0–3	(MM) Minerul Baia Borșa	0–1	0–2	0–6 Pts.
Prod Câmpineanca (VN)	5–3	(BZ) Olimpia Râmnicu Sărat	2–1	3–2	6–0 Pts.
Spicpo Poroschia (TL)	0–2	(GR) Petrolul Roata de Jos	0–1	0–1	0–6 Pts.
Minerul Certej (HD)	4–2	(AB) Minerul Roșia Montană	2–1	2–1	6–0 Pts.
Șantierul Naval Galați (GL)	2–11	(VS) Sportul Municipal Vaslui	1–1	1–10	1–4 Pts.
Anticoroziv București (B)	1–2	(B) Electromagnetica București	1–1	0–1	1–4 Pts.
Minerul Bustuchin (GJ)	1–2	(DJ) Autobuzul IJTL Craiova	1–1	0–1	1–4 Pts.
Severnav Drobeta-Turnu Severin (MH)	2–7	(CS) CFR Caransebeș	2–1	0–6	3–3 Pts.
Dunărea Grădiștea (CL)	2–5	(CT) Electrica Voința Constanța	1–0	1–5	3–3 Pts.
Chimia Brăila (BR)	4–1	(TL) Delta Ferom Tulcea	4–0	0–1	3–3 Pts.
Foresta Ciurea (IS)	4–6	(BT) CSM Bucecea	2–1	2–5	3–3 Pts.

Tie breaker match

Autobuzul and Electromagnetica played a tie breaker match in order to determine the 16th promoted team. The match was played on 18 June 1995 at Dacia Stadium in Ștefănești.

Team 1	Score	Team 2
Autobuzul IJTL Craiova (DJ)	0–2	(B) Electromagnetica București

== League standings ==
=== Arad County ===
Pos	Team	Pld	W	D	L	GF	GA	GD	Pts	Qualification or relegation
1	Telecom Arad (C, Q)	30	19	6	5	66	27	+39	63	Qualification for promotion play-off
2	Indagrara Arad	30	19	2	9	83	52	+31	59	
3	Șoimii Lipova	30	16	2	12	75	38	+37	50	
4	Crișul Chișineu-Criș	30	16	2	12	65	52	+13	50	
5	Gloria Arad	30	15	5	10	54	42	+12	50	
6	Ineu	30	14	4	12	47	41	+6	46	
7	Victoria Nădlac	30	13	5	12	71	55	+16	44	
8	Petromureș Zădăreni	30	13	5	12	60	58	+2	44	
9	Agroindustrial Curtici	30	13	5	12	59	67	−8	44	
10	Tricoul Roșu Arad	29	13	4	12	43	42	+1	43	
11	Vulturii Socodor	30	12	5	13	53	53	0	41	
12	Șoimii Pâncota	29	11	6	12	35	30	+5	39	
13	CFR Arad (R)	30	11	3	16	48	61	−13	36	Qualification to relegation play-off
14	Unirea Șofronea (O)	30	10	6	14	46	67	−21	36	Qualification to relegation play-off
15	Șiriana Șiria (R)	30	6	3	21	28	87	−59	21	Relegation to Arad County Championship
16	Valco Zăbrani (R)	28	6	1	21	20	83	−63	19	Relegation to Arad County Championship

Rules for classification: 1) Points; 2) Goal difference; 3) Number of goals scored.
(C) Champions; (O) Play-off winners; (Q) Qualified for the phase indicated; (R) Relegated

Relegation play-off
First round

Team 1	Score	Team 2
Dacia Beliu	3–2	Unirea Șofronea
CFR Arad	0–3	ASA Mureșul Arad

Second round

Team 1	Score	Team 2
Unirea Șofronea	3–1	CFR Arad

=== Bihor County ===
Pos	Team	Pld	W	D	L	GF	GA	GD	Pts	Qualification or relegation
1	Minerul Ștei (C, Q)	26	20	4	2	75	21	+54	64	Qualification to promotion play-off
2	Voința Oradea	26	17	7	2	56	22	+34	58	
3	Minerul Voivozi	26	15	4	7	57	28	+29	49	
4	Romtrans Oradea	26	14	6	6	50	31	+19	48	
5	Crișul Aleșd	26	14	2	10	53	43	+10	44	
6	Arovit Valea lui Mihai	26	11	7	8	45	34	+11	40	
7	Bihoreana Marghita	26	12	2	12	41	46	−5	38	
8	Oțelul Ștei	26	10	4	12	47	42	+5	34	
9	Petrolul Suplac	26	9	3	14	40	54	−14	30	
10	Bihorul Beiuș	26	9	1	16	39	64	−25	28	
11	Victoria Avram Iancu	26	8	4	14	23	57	−34	28	
12	Metalica Oradea	26	6	4	16	35	48	−13	22	
13	Minerul Șuncuiuș	26	5	3	18	33	55	−22	18	
14	Energia Oradea	26	5	3	18	26	76	−50	18	

Rules for classification: 1) Points; 2) Goal difference; 3) Number of goals scored.
(C) Champions; (Q) Qualified for the phase indicated

=== Bucharest ===
Series I

Pos	Team	Pld	W	D	L	GF	GA	GD	Pts	Qualification or relegation
1	Electromagnetica București (C, Q)	30	24	3	3	68	13	+55	51	Qualification to promotion play-off
2	Tehnometal București	30	18	5	7	59	29	+30	41	
3	Tungal Metrou București	30	15	8	7	53	27	+26	38	
4	Șoimii Otopeni	30	16	3	11	51	41	+10	35	
5	Laromet București	30	15	4	11	45	44	+1	34	
6	Grivița BTA București	30	14	4	12	43	40	+3	32	
7	Voința București	30	13	4	13	42	36	+6	30	
8	Termo București	30	12	6	12	36	35	+1	30	
9	Automatica București	30	12	5	13	39	34	+5	29	
10	URBIS București	30	10	8	12	35	47	−12	28	
11	ICSIM București	30	10	7	13	38	40	−2	27	
12	ICAR București	30	11	4	15	37	52	−15	26	
13	Coresi București	30	11	3	16	30	38	−8	25	
14	Electra București	30	9	6	15	30	51	−21	24	
15	Petrolul București	32	8	8	16	24	42	−18	24	
16	Buftea	30	3	2	25	24	85	−61	8	

Rules for classification: 1) Points; 2) Goal difference; 3) Number of goals scored.
(C) Champions; (Q) Qualified for the phase indicated

Series II

Pos	Team	Pld	W	D	L	GF	GA	GD	Pts	Qualification or relegation
1	Anticoroziv București (C, Q)	30	24	3	3	73	14	+59	51	Qualification to promotion play-off
2	FCME București	30	23	2	5	68	20	+48	48	
3	Antilosport București	30	20	3	7	69	24	+45	43	
4	Acumulatorul București	30	20	1	9	55	31	+24	41	
5	Girueta București	30	16	4	10	65	39	+26	36	
6	Policolor București	30	16	3	11	51	32	+19	35	
7	Fulgerul Bragadiru	30	15	4	11	46	40	+6	34	
8	Romprim București	30	14	6	10	65	42	+23	34	
9	Gaz Glin	30	13	3	14	46	38	+8	29	
10	ASA Omega București	30	12	3	15	52	45	+7	27	
11	IMGB București	30	9	6	15	30	34	−4	24	
12	Inter Voluntari	30	8	7	15	26	44	−18	23	
13	Prefabricate București	30	8	4	18	37	62	−25	20	
14	Voința Clinceni	30	7	1	22	22	110	−88	15	
15	Vulcan București	30	5	3	22	25	89	−64	13	
16	Dobroești Gran	30	2	3	25	26	92	−66	7	

Rules for classification: 1) Points; 2) Goal difference; 3) Number of goals scored.
(C) Champions; (Q) Qualified for the phase indicated

=== Caraș-Severin County ===
Pos	Team	Pld	W	D	L	GF	GA	GD	Pts	Qualification or relegation
1	CFR Caransebeș (C, Q)	30	22	3	5	82	22	+60	69	Qualification to promotion play-off
2	Metalul Oțelu Roșu	30	21	4	5	65	22	+43	67	
3	Caromet Caransebeș	30	15	6	9	63	32	+31	51	
4	Minerul Moldova Nouă	30	16	3	11	64	34	+30	51	
5	Muncitorul Reșița	30	14	6	10	69	41	+28	48	
6	Oravița	30	14	3	13	67	45	+22	45	
7	Minerul Cozla	30	14	3	13	52	56	−4	45	
8	Metalul Topleț	30	12	7	11	49	41	+8	43	
9	Minerul Nera Bozovici	30	14	3	13	55	56	−1	43 (Note: Minerul Nera Bozovici deducted 2 points.)	
10	Mundus Caransebeș	30	13	3	14	56	37	+19	42	
11	Bistra Glimboca	30	11	6	13	38	52	−14	39	
12	Dunărea Moldova Nouă	30	12	1	17	49	66	−17	37	
13	Voința UCMR Oțelu Roșu	30	8	10	12	37	48	−11	34	
14	Foresta Zăvoi	30	8	6	16	40	87	−47	30	
15	Hercules Băile Herculane (R)	30	7	4	19	32	102	−70	25	Relegation to Liga V Caraș-Severin
16	Energia ACH Poiana Mărului (R)	30	3	5	22	23	101	−78	14	Relegation to Liga V Caraș-Severin

Rules for classification: 1) Points; 2) Goal difference; 3) Number of goals scored.
(C) Champions; (Q) Qualified for the phase indicated; (R) Relegated

=== Cluj County ===
Pos	Team	Pld	W	D	L	GF	GA	GD	Pts	Qualification or relegation
1	IS Câmpia Turzii (C, Q)	30	25	2	3	105	28	+77	77	Qualification to promotion play-off
2	Olimpia Gherla	30	22	3	5	90	25	+65	69	
3	Victoria Someșeni	30	19	6	5	66	31	+35	63	
4	Clujana Cluj-Napoca	30	19	5	6	83	32	+51	62	
5	Dromex Cluj-Napoca	30	15	6	9	63	36	+27	51	
6	Minerul Aghireș	30	15	6	9	60	35	+25	51	
7	Cimentul Turda	30	14	9	7	50	31	+19	51	
8	Minerul Ocna Dej	30	12	7	11	58	47	+11	43	
9	"U" CUG Cluj-Napoca	30	12	5	13	69	61	+8	41	
10	Consaur Cluj-Napoca	30	11	4	15	39	43	−4	37	
11	Electroceramica Turda	30	10	1	19	38	88	−50	31	
12	Metalurgistul Cluj-Napoca	30	8	5	17	39	59	−20	29	
13	Arieșul Câmpia Turzii	30	8	4	18	45	56	−11	28	
14	Condor Tehnofrig Cluj-Napoca	30	7	5	18	38	68	−30	26	
15	Motorul IRA Cluj-Napoca	30	4	2	24	36	128	−92	14	
16	CFR Cluj-Napoca II	30	2	4	24	23	134	−111	10	

Rules for classification: 1) points; 2) goal difference; 3) number of goals scored.
(C) Champions; (Q) Qualified for the phase indicated

=== Covasna County ===
Pos	Team	Pld	W	D	L	GF	GA	GD	Pts	Qualification or relegation
1	Bradul Zagon (C, Q)	26	22	3	1	89	19	+70	69	Qualification to promotion play-off
2	ICB Malnaș	26	21	1	4	90	18	+72	64	
3	Victoria Ozun	26	17	1	8	84	29	+55	52	
4	Șoimii Minerul Baraolt	26	14	4	8	91	28	+63	46	
5	KSE Târgu Secuiesc	26	14	3	9	51	37	+14	45	
6	Perkő Sânzieni	25	13	3	9	78	36	+42	42	
7	Stăruința Cernat	26	11	3	12	38	53	−15	36	
8	Nemere Ghelința	26	9	6	11	45	60	−15	33	
9	Avântul Catalina	26	8	7	11	52	52	0	31	
10	Carpați Covasna	26	7	6	13	38	69	−31	27	
11	ICB Bixad	26	6	7	13	29	62	−33	25	
12	PRIM Brăduț	25	5	6	14	38	70	−32	21	
13	CSȘ Sfântu Gheorghe	26	3	3	20	28	110	−82	12	
14	Spartacus Hăghig	26	3	3	20	30	138	−108	12	

Rules for classification: 1) Points; 2) Goal difference; 3) Number of goals scored.
(C) Champions; (Q) Qualified for the phase indicated

=== Dolj County ===
Pos	Team	Pld	W	D	L	GF	GA	GD	Pts	Qualification or relegation
1	Autobuzul Craiova (C, Q)	32	23	5	4	78	32	+46	74 (Note: The match Elpreco Craiova – Autobuzul Craiova 0–3, from 26th round, was approved initially with 3–0, but was reversed to the result from the field after the appeal.)	Qualification to promotion play-off
2	Petrolul Craiova	32	23	4	5	64	20	+44	73	
3	Progresul Segarcea	32	20	6	6	57	25	+32	66	
4	Progresul Băilești	32	21	2	9	90	31	+59	65	
5	Morărit-Panificație Craiova	32	15	4	13	52	40	+12	49	
6	Tractorul Craiova	32	13	4	15	47	46	+1	43	
7	Bere Craiova	32	11	10	11	37	40	−3	43	
8	Energo TMC Filiași	32	11	7	14	57	61	−4	40	
9	Armata Craiova	32	11	6	15	39	39	0	39	
10	Dunărea Calafat	32	11	6	15	44	47	−3	39	
11	Victoria Leu	32	12	3	17	37	59	−22	39	
12	CFR Craiova	32	11	5	16	51	53	−2	38	
13	Elpreco Craiova	32	11	5	16	49	67	−18	38	
14	Unirea Tricolor Dăbuleni	32	11	5	16	53	73	−20	38	
15	Victoria IRA Plenița	32	11	4	17	38	57	−19	37	
16	Fulgerul Maglavit	32	11	1	20	38	68	−30	34	
17	Unirea Amărăști de Jos (R)	32	7	1	24	36	109	−73	22	Relegation to Dolj County Championship
18	Melstar Melinești (Note: Melstar Melinești withdrew in the first part of the season and all its results were canceled.) (D)	0	0	0	0	0	0	0	0	Withdrew

Rules for classification: 1) points; 2) goal difference; 3) number of goals scored.
(C) Champions; (D) Disqualified; (Q) Qualified for the phase indicated; (R) Relegated

=== Harghita County ===
Pos	Team	Pld	W	D	L	GF	GA	GD	Pts	Qualification or relegation
1	Vulturul Carpatin Gheorgheni (C, Q)	18	14	2	2	68	10	+58	44	Qualification to promotion play-off
2	ASA Rapid Miercurea Ciuc	18	13	4	1	60	7	+53	43	
3	Minerul Bălan	18	11	4	3	63	17	+46	37	
4	Unirea Cristuru Secuiesc	18	10	4	4	61	26	+35	34	
5	Complexul Gălăuțaș	18	8	3	7	49	30	+19	27	
6	Viitorul Gheorgheni	18	7	2	9	25	26	−1	23	
7	Unirea Hodoșa	18	5	2	11	28	68	−40	17	
8	Unirea Lueta	17	5	1	11	31	58	−27	16	
9	Apemin Sâncrăieni	18	2	2	14	14	85	−71	8	
10	Firtoș Corund	17	2	0	15	14	86	−72	6	
11	Hamerock Suseni (D)	0	0	0	0	0	0	0	0 (Note: Hamerock Suseni and Bradul Ciceu withdrew in the first part of the season and all their results were canceled.)	Withdrew
12	Bradul Ciceu (D)	0	0	0	0	0	0	0	0	Withdrew

Rules for classification: 1) Points; 2) Goal difference; 3) Number of goals scored.
(C) Champions; (D) Disqualified; (Q) Qualified for the phase indicated

=== Hunedoara County ===
Pos	Team	Pld	W	D	L	GF	GA	GD	Pts	Qualification or relegation
1	Minerul Certej (C, Q)	32	24	6	2	100	28	+72	78	Qualification to promotion play-off
2	Aurul Brad	32	19	2	11	80	33	+47	59	
3	Minerul Aninoasa	32	18	5	9	66	33	+33	59	
4	Victoria 90 Călan	32	19	2	11	66	34	+32	59	
5	Minerul Știința Vulcan	32	18	4	10	59	48	+11	58	
6	Dacia Orăștie	32	19	0	13	92	48	+44	57	
7	Constructorul Hunedoara	32	18	2	12	74	46	+28	56	
8	Minerul Ghelari	32	15	5	12	62	49	+13	50	
9	Minerul Livezeni	32	15	5	12	51	44	+7	50	
10	Jiul Petrila	32	15	3	14	66	54	+12	48	
11	Minerul Bărbăteni	32	13	6	13	61	47	+14	45	
12	Favior Orăștie	32	10	4	18	45	72	−27	34	
13	Metalul Crișcior	32	10	3	19	44	74	−30	33	
14	Minerul Teliuc	32	10	3	19	31	81	−50	33	
15	EGCL Călan	32	9	3	20	39	115	−76	30	
16	Haber Hațeg	32	7	6	19	47	95	−48	27	
17	CFR Simeria	32	2	5	25	24	106	−82	11	

Rules for classification: 1) points; 2) goal difference; 3) number of goals scored.
(C) Champions; (Q) Qualified for the phase indicated

=== Mehedinți County ===
Pos	Team	Pld	W	D	L	GF	GA	GD	Pts	Qualification or relegation
1	Severnav Drobeta-Turnu Severin (C, Q)	26	25	0	1	146	15	+131	75	Qualification to promotion play-off
2	AEC Halânga	26	19	3	4	102	32	+70	60	
3	Minerul Drobeta-Turnu Severin	26	15	4	7	73	51	+22	49	
4	Termo Drobeta-Turnu Severin	26	14	4	8	52	23	+29	46	
5	Viitorul Cujmir	26	12	4	10	40	41	−1	40	
6	Victoria Vânju Mare	26	11	6	9	68	52	+16	39	
7	Dierna Orșova	26	11	3	12	51	58	−7	36	
8	Minerul Baia de Aramă	26	10	2	14	44	72	−28	32	
9	Agromec Șimian	26	8	3	15	43	74	−31	27	
10	Marmura Breznița-Ocol	26	9	0	17	40	76	−36	27	
11	Armătura Strehaia	26	8	2	16	47	78	−31	26	
12	Hidro Porțile de Fier II	26	7	4	15	39	76	−37	25	
13	FAMC Drobeta-Turnu Severin	26	6	6	14	41	77	−36	24	
14	Pandurii Cerneți	26	5	3	18	41	102	−61	18	

Rules for classification: 1) Points; 2) Head-to-head points; 3) Head-to-head goal difference; 4) Head-to-head goals scored; 5) Head-to-head away goals scored; 6) Goal difference; 7) Goals scored.
(C) Champions; (Q) Qualified for the phase indicated

=== Mureș County ===
Pos	Team	Pld	W	D	L	GF	GA	GD	Pts	Qualification or relegation
1	Electromureș Târgu Mureș (C, Q)	28	23	0	5	80	20	+60	69	Qualification to promotion play-off
2	Berea Reghin	28	21	1	6	90	26	+64	64	
3	Gaz Metan Târgu Mureș	28	18	4	6	69	22	+47	58	
4	Iernut	28	18	3	7	72	38	+34	57	
5	Unirea Ungheni	28	16	2	10	78	39	+39	50	
6	Cetatea ASA Sighișoara	28	15	1	12	63	47	+16	46	
7	Mureșul Romvelo Luduș	28	12	4	12	46	38	+8	40	
8	Foresta Sovata	28	11	4	13	53	46	+7	37	
9	Victoria Sărățeni	28	10	4	14	34	71	−37	34	
10	Voința Miercurea Nirajului	28	9	5	14	43	50	−7	32	
11	Matricon Târgu Mureș	28	8	6	14	31	64	−33	30	
12	Viitorul Gănești	28	9	1	18	30	72	−42	28	
13	ILEFOR ASA Târgu Mureș	28	8	3	17	33	38	−5	27	
14	Sărmașu	28	6	2	20	38	110	−72	17 (Note: Sărmașu deducted 3 points.)	
15	Bradul Răstolnița	28	4	4	20	30	109	−79	16	
16	Sticla Târnăveni (Note: Sticla Târnăveni withdrew after 18 rounds.) (D)	0	0	0	0	0	0	0	0	Withdrew

Rules for classification: 1) points; 2) goal difference; 3) number of goals scored.
(C) Champions; (D) Disqualified; (Q) Qualified for the phase indicated

=== Neamț County ===
Pos	Team	Pld	W	D	L	GF	GA	GD	Pts	Qualification or relegation
1	Cimentul Bicaz (C, Q)	22	20	1	1	104	22	+82	61	Qualification to promotion play-off
2	Laminorul Roman	22	15	1	6	79	35	+44	44 (Note: Laminorul Roman, Voința Borlești, Progresul Doljești and Șoimii Piatra Șoimului were deducted 2 points.)	
3	Juventus Piatra Neamț	22	13	3	6	71	31	+40	42	
4	Voința Borlești	22	13	3	6	75	34	+41	40	
5	Bradul Roznov	22	11	2	9	39	51	−12	35	
6	IM Piatra Neamț	22	9	3	10	45	48	−3	30	
7	Azochim Săvinești	22	8	5	9	34	42	−8	29	
8	Viitorul AGET Podoleni	22	8	3	11	52	50	+2	27	
9	Energia Zahorna Poiana Teiului	22	7	3	12	41	93	−52	24 (Note: Energia Zahorna Poiana Teiului replaced Victoria Roman after two rounds, after this one was excluded for two no-shows.)	
10	Danubiana Roman	22	6	0	16	38	68	−30	18	
11	Progresul Doljești	22	5	1	16	25	81	−56	14	
12	Șoimii Piatra Șoimului	22	4	1	17	27	75	−48	11	
13	Rapid Piatra Neamț (D)	0	0	0	0	0	0	0	0 (Note: Rapid Piatra Neamț was excluded after 8 rounds and all its results were canceled.)	Excluded
14	Vulturul Zănești (D)	0	0	0	0	0	0	0	0 (Note: Vulturul Zănești was excluded after 7 rounds and all its results were canceled.)	Excluded

Rules for classification: 1) Points; 2) Goal difference; 3) Number of goals scored.
(C) Champions; (D) Disqualified; (Q) Qualified for the phase indicated

=== Olt County ===
Pos	Team	Pld	W	D	L	GF	GA	GD	Pts	Qualification or relegation
1	Slatina (C, Q)	28	22	4	2	96	18	+78	70	Qualification to promotion play-off
2	Olt 90 Scornicești	28	21	4	3	106	20	+86	67	
3	Constructorul Slatina	28	21	3	4	97	26	+71	66	
4	Brias Brebeni	28	16	4	8	58	34	+24	52	
5	Petrolul Potcoava	28	13	7	8	49	44	+5	46	
6	Rapid Piatra-Olt	28	14	4	10	49	41	+8	46	
7	Recolta Stoicănești	28	13	3	12	47	51	−4	42	
8	Progresul IOB Balș	28	12	2	14	63	65	−2	38	
9	Progresul Corabia	28	11	2	15	32	52	−20	35	
10	Sporting Slatina	28	10	3	15	46	51	−5	33	
11	Oltețul Osica	28	9	4	15	45	49	−4	31	
12	Unirea Stoenești	28	9	2	17	48	66	−18	29	
13	Unirea Turia	28	6	2	20	40	96	−56	20	
14	Energia Cilieni	28	4	3	21	34	105	−71	15	
15	Gloria Vișina	28	4	3	21	27	119	−92	15	
16	Viitorul Orlea (D)	0	0	0	0	0	0	0	0 (Note: Viitorul Orlea excluded from championship after three no show-up and all its results were canceled.)	Excluded

Rules for classification: 1) points; 2) goal difference; 3) number of goals scored.
(C) Champions; (D) Disqualified; (Q) Qualified for the phase indicated

=== Sălaj County ===
Pos	Team	Pld	W	D	L	GF	GA	GD	Pts	Qualification or relegation (Note: After 18 matches the first 5 teams qualified for the play-offs, which was played in a double round-robin tournament.)
1	Mobila Șimleu Silvaniei (C, Q)	26	18	5	3	91	32	+59	59	Qualification to promotion play-off
2	Someșul Someș-Odorhei	26	16	6	4	80	37	+43	54	
3	Someșul Jibou	26	13	8	5	70	50	+20	47	
4	Chimia Zalău	26	12	7	7	53	34	+19	43	
5	Minerul Ip	26	12	0	14	50	46	+4	36	
6	Tractorul Nușfalău	18	6	2	10	31	43	−12	20	
7	Minerul Zăghid	18	4	2	12	27	46	−19	14	
8	Inter Gârcei	18	4	1	13	21	55	−34	13	
9	Progresul Bălan	18	4	0	14	24	57	−33	12	
10	Rapid Jibou	18	3	2	13	12	55	−43	11	

Rules for classification: 1) points; 2) goal difference; 3) number of goals scored.
(C) Champions; (Q) Qualified for the phase indicated

=== Sibiu County ===
Pos	Team	Pld	W	D	L	GF	GA	GD	Pts	Qualification or relegation
1	Șoimii Compa Sibiu (C, Q)	26	21	4	1	78	16	+62	67	Qualification to promotion play-off
2	Mecanica Mârșa	26	21	0	5	85	29	+56	63	
3	Sparta Mediaș	26	17	2	7	63	30	+33	53	
4	CSU Hidrosembraz Sibiu	26	13	6	7	52	43	+9	45	
5	Record Mediaș	26	12	6	8	49	43	+6	42	
6	Geromed Mediaș	26	11	5	10	33	28	+5	38	
7	CFR Retezat Sibiu	26	10	3	13	33	28	+5	33	
8	Vitrometan Mediaș	26	9	4	13	45	54	−9	31	
9	Carpați Agnita	26	8	3	15	42	58	−16	27	
10	Textila Cisnădie	26	8	3	15	35	56	−21	27	
11	Construcții Sibiu	26	8	3	15	28	52	−24	27	
12	Romanofir Tălmaciu	26	7	3	16	31	61	−30	24	
13	Unirea Ocna Sibiului	26	7	3	16	31	61	−30	24	
14	Cedonia 95 Sibiu	26	5	3	18	35	75	−40	18	
15	Textila Mediaș (Note: Textila Mediaș and Carbomet Copșa Mică withdrew during the season and all their results were canceled.) (D)	0	0	0	0	0	0	0	0	Withdrew
16	Carbomet Copșa Mică (D)	0	0	0	0	0	0	0	0	Withdrew

Rules for classification: 1) Points; 2) Head-to-head points; 3) Head-to-head goal difference; 4) Head-to-head goals scored; 5) Head-to-head away goals scored; 6) Goal difference; 7) Goals scored.
(C) Champions; (D) Disqualified; (Q) Qualified for the phase indicated

=== Timiș County ===
Pos	Team	Pld	W	D	L	GF	GA	GD	Pts	Qualification or relegation
1	Furnirul Deta (C, Q)	34	22	7	5	78	25	+53	73	Qualification to promotion play-off
2	Electrica Timișoara	34	22	5	7	84	35	+49	71	
3	Șoimii Textila Timișoara	34	22	4	8	87	39	+48	70	
4	Timișul Șag	34	19	8	7	62	25	+37	65	
5	Obilici Sânmartinu Sârbesc	34	18	3	13	81	50	+31	57	
6	Laminorul Nădrag	34	15	6	13	62	56	+6	51	
7	Modern Timișoara	34	14	7	13	63	51	+12	49	
8	Unirea Tomnatic	34	14	5	15	56	57	−1	47	
9	Auto FZB Timișoara	34	14	4	16	59	47	+12	46	
10	Timpuri Noi Giarmata	34	14	4	16	41	57	−16	46	
11	Bancom Comloșu Mare	34	13	5	16	45	50	−5	44	
12	Tehnolemn Timișoara	34	12	8	14	44	57	−13	44	
13	Unirea Sânnicolau Mare	34	13	5	16	49	65	−16	44	
14	Unirea Peciu Nou	34	14	1	19	44	62	−18	43	
15	ELBA Timișoara	34	12	4	18	52	81	−29	40	
16	Azur Timișoara (Note: Azur Timișoara was spared from relegation due to the promotion of Furnirul Deta in Divizia C.)	34	10	4	20	46	75	−29	34	Spared from relegation
17	Dacia Timișoara (R)	34	7	7	20	47	76	−29	28	Relegation to Timiș County Championship
18	Victoria Lugoj (Note: Victoria Lugoj withdrew during the season and lost all remaining matches with 0–3.) (R)	34	5	5	24	28	106	−78	20	Relegation to Timiș County Championship

Rules for classification: 1) points; 2) goal difference; 3) number of goals scored.
(C) Champions; (Q) Qualified for the phase indicated; (R) Relegated

=== Vâlcea County ===
Pos	Team	Pld	W	D	L	GF	GA	GD	Pts	Qualification or relegation
1	Petrolul Drăgășani (C, Q)	30	26	4	0	137	10	+127	82	Qualification to promotion play-off
2	Oltchim Râmnicu Vâlcea	30	22	6	2	82	16	+66	72	
3	Cozia Călimănești	30	18	7	5	101	42	+59	61	
4	Carpatina Râmnicu Vâlcea	30	19	4	7	84	25	+59	61	
5	Oltețul Alunu	30	15	6	9	68	28	+40	51	
6	Metalul Băbeni	30	15	5	10	59	41	+18	50	
7	Forestierul Băbeni	30	13	8	9	38	37	+1	47	
8	Minerul Copăceni	30	12	6	12	41	38	+3	42	
9	Lotru Brezoi	30	11	5	14	53	64	−11	38	
10	Sănătatea Govora	30	9	7	14	37	67	−30	34	
11	Minerul Popești	30	9	4	17	36	59	−23	31	
12	Universal Coop Sutești	30	8	5	17	53	89	−36	29	
13	Râureni	30	7	7	16	52	78	−26	28	
14	Flacăra Horezu	30	7	2	21	42	104	−62	23	
15	Lotru Voineasa	30	4	5	21	33	123	−90	17	
16	Dinamo Frâncești	30	2	3	25	32	133	−101	9	

Rules for classification: 1) points; 2) goal difference; 3) number of goals scored.
(C) Champions; (Q) Qualified for the phase indicated

== See also ==
- 1994–95 Divizia A
- 1994–95 Divizia B
- 1994–95 Divizia C
- 1994–95 Cupa României
