= 1993–94 Divizia B =

Divizia B
- Season: 1993–94
- Promoted: Argeș Pitești; Maramureș Baia Mare
- Relegated: Foresta Fălticeni; Metalul Bocșa; Constructorul Iași; Drobeta-Turnu Severin
- Top goalscorer: Marius Păcurar (11 goals)

The 1993–94 Divizia B was the 54th season of the second tier of the Romanian football league system.

The format has been maintained to two series, each of them having 18 teams. At the end of the season, the winners of the series promoted to Divizia A and the last two places from both series relegated to Divizia C.

== Team changes ==
=== To Divizia B ===
Promoted from Divizia C

- Constructorul Iași
- Metalul Plopeni
- Gaz Metan Mediaș
- Phoenix Baia Mare

Relegated from Divizia A

- Selena Bacău
- CSM Reșița

=== From Divizia B ===
Relegated to Divizia C

- Olt 90 Scornicești
- Metalurgistul Cugir
- Unirea Slobozia
- Olimpia Satu Mare

Promoted to Divizia A

- Ceahlăul Piatra Neamț
- UTA Arad

=== Renamed teams ===
Unirea Focșani was renamed as Acord Focșani.

CSM Suceava was renamed as Bucovina Suceava.

Autobuzul București was renamed as Rocar București.

== League tables ==
=== Serie I ===
Pos	Team	Pld	W	D	L	GF	GA	GD	Pts	Promotion or relegation
1	Argeș Pitești (C, P)	34	22	11	1	65	21	+44	55	Promotion to Divizia A
2	Politehnica Iași	34	17	3	14	56	26	+30	37	
3	Steaua Mizil	34	15	6	13	39	33	+6	36	
4	Acord Focșani	34	16	4	14	57	43	+14	36	
5	ASA Târgu Mureș	34	15	6	13	43	36	+7	36	
6	Metalul Plopeni	34	15	6	13	36	32	+4	36	
7	Selena Bacău	34	15	5	14	56	46	+10	35	
8	Faur București	34	14	6	14	45	42	+3	34	
9	Flacăra Moreni	34	14	5	15	44	50	−6	33	
10	Chimia Râmnicu Vâlcea	34	13	7	14	45	54	−9	33	
11	Gloria Buzău	34	13	5	16	36	39	−3	31	
12	Portul Constanța	34	10	11	13	38	41	−3	31	
13	Gloria CFR Galați	34	13	5	16	46	57	−11	31	
14	Callatis Mangalia	34	12	7	15	45	56	−11	31	
15	Bucovina Suceava	34	12	7	15	45	58	−13	31	
16	Rocar București	34	10	11	13	34	47	−13	31	
17	Foresta Fălticeni (R)	34	13	3	18	47	66	−19	29	Relegation to Divizia C
18	Constructorul Iași (R)	34	10	6	18	32	62	−30	26	Relegation to Divizia C

Source: romaniansoccer.ro (in Romanian)
Rules for classification: 1) Points; 2) Head-to-head points; 3) Head-to-head goal difference; 4) Head-to-head goals scored; 5) Head-to-head away goals scored; 6) Goal difference; 7) Goals scored.
(C) Champions; (P) Promoted; (R) Relegated

=== Serie II ===
Pos	Team	Pld	W	D	L	GF	GA	GD	Pts	Promotion or relegation
1	Maramureș Baia Mare (C, P)	34	25	6	3	94	42	+52	56	Promotion to Divizia A
2	Unirea Alba Iulia	34	21	7	6	70	34	+36	49	
3	CSM Reșița	34	19	2	13	52	46	+6	40	
4	Tractorul Brașov	34	17	2	15	51	41	+10	36	
5	Bihor Oradea	34	15	6	13	51	45	+6	36	
6	Metrom Brașov	34	14	6	14	44	31	+13	34	
7	Gaz Metan Mediaș	34	14	6	14	41	37	+4	34	
8	Gloria Reșița	34	13	8	13	50	47	+3	34	
9	Corvinul Hunedoara	34	15	3	16	56	50	+6	33	
10	CFR Timișoara	34	12	8	14	43	52	−9	32	
11	ICIM Brașov	34	12	7	15	44	55	−11	31	
12	CFR Cluj	34	12	6	16	53	57	−4	30	
13	Jiul Petroșani	34	13	4	17	47	55	−8	30	
14	Jiul IELIF Craiova	34	13	4	17	42	57	−15	30	
15	Armătura Zalău	34	12	5	17	42	57	−15	29	
16	Phoenix Baia Mare	34	12	3	19	35	50	−15	27	
17	Metalul Bocșa (R)	34	10	7	17	31	53	−22	27	Relegation to Divizia C
18	Drobeta-Turnu Severin (R)	34	10	4	20	37	74	−37	24	Relegation to Divizia C

Source: romaniansoccer.ro (in Romanian)
Rules for classification: 1) Points; 2) Head-to-head points; 3) Head-to-head goal difference; 4) Head-to-head goals scored; 5) Head-to-head away goals scored; 6) Goal difference; 7) Goals scored.
(C) Champions; (P) Promoted; (R) Relegated

== Relegation play-off ==
Phoenix Baia Mare and Metalul Bocșa ended the season with the same number of points and the Romanian Football Federation decided to organize a relegation play-off match to decide which team stays in the Divizia B and which team relegates to Divizia C.

Team 1	Score	Team 2
Phoenix Baia Mare (16th)	2–1	(17th) Metalul Bocșa

== Top scorers ==
11 goals

- (Romania) Marius Păcurar (Corvinul Hunedoara)

10 goals

- (Romania) Gabriel Mărgărit (Faur București)
- (Romania) Constantin Barbu (Argeș Pitești)

9 goals

- (Romania) Cristian Coroian (CFR Cluj)
- (Romania) Dănuț Matei (CFR Cluj)

8 goals

- (Romania) Daniel Baston (Gloria CFR Galați)

6 goals

- (Romania) Attila Piroska (CFR Cluj)
- (Romania) Daniel Huza (Jiul Petroșani)
- (Romania) Dănuț Oprea (Gloria CFR Galați)

5 goals

- (Romania) Mircea Stanciu (ASA Târgu Mureș)

== See also ==
- 1993–94 Divizia A
