= Mugurel Cornățeanu =

Romanian footballer (born 1972)

Personal information
- Full name: Mugurel Florin Cornățeanu
- Date of birth: 21 February 1972 (age 54)
- Place of birth: Constanța, Romania
- Position: Midfielder

Youth career
- Farul Constanța

Senior career*
| Years | Team | Apps | (Gls) |
| 1989–1990 | Farul Constanța | 2 | (0) |
| 1991–1992 | Callatis Mangalia | | (3) |
| 1992–1993 | Portul Constanța | 14 | (1) |
| 1993 | Callatis Mangalia | 12 | (5) |
| 1994–1995 | Farul Constanța | 53 | (11) |
| 1995–1996 | Lokeren | | |
| 1996–1997 | Beveren | | |
| 1997 | Turnhout | | |
| 1998 | Steaua București | 6 | (0) |
| 1998–1999 | Farul Constanța | 16 | (2) |
| 2000–2001 | Callatis Mangalia | 26 | (2) |
| 2001–2002 | Laminorul Roman | 12 | (0) |
| 2003–2004 | Callatis Mangalia | 24 | (5) |
| Total | | 164 | (29) |

Managerial career
- 2004–2006: Callatis Mangalia (assistant)
- 2006–2008: Farul Constanța (youth)
- 2008–2009: Callatis Mangalia
- 2009–2010: Gheorghe Hagi Academy (youth)
- 2011–2013: Callatis Mangalia
- 2013: Fortuna Poiana Câmpina
- 2014: Dinamo II București
- 2014–2015: Botoșani (assistant)
- 2015: Botoșani (caretaker)
- 2015–2016: Dinamo II București
- 2016–2018: Concordia II Chiajna
- 2018: Voința Turnu Măgurele
- 2018: Petrolul Ploiești (assistant)
- 2018–2019: Petrolul Ploiești
- 2020–2021: Politehnica Iași (assistant)
- 2022–2024: Politehnica Iași (assistant)
- 2024–2026: Politehnica Iași (sporting director)
- * Club domestic league appearances and goals

Mugurel Florin Cornățeanu (born 21 February 1972) is a Romanian former professional footballer who played as a midfielder.

== Playing career ==
In his career Cornățeanu played in Divizia A for teams such as: Farul Constanța and Steaua București and in Divizia B for Callatis Mangalia, Portul Constanța and Laminorul Roman. He also played for a year and half in Belgium for Beveren, Lokeren and Turnhout. He is currently the Head Coach of Liga II side Petrolul Ploiești.

== Honours ==
KSK Beveren

- Division II: 1996–97

Steaua București

- Divizia A: 1997–98
