= Miroși =

- Commune
- Location in Romania
- Coordinates: 44.4013°N 24.9445°E
- Country: Romania
- County: Argeș

Government
  - Mayor (2020–2024): Marin Niță (PSD)
- Area: 48.11 km^{2} (18.58 sq mi)
- Elevation: 157 m (515 ft)
- Population (2021-12-01): 1,949
  - Density: 41/km^{2} (100/sq mi)
- Time zone: EET/EEST (UTC+2/+3)
- Postal code: 117490
- Vehicle reg.: AG
- Website: www.cjarges.ro/en/web/mirosi

Miroși is a commune in Argeș County, Muntenia, Romania. It is composed of two villages, Miroși and Surdulești.

== Natives ==
- Marius Diță (born 1975), footballer
