= Constantin Bârsan =

Romanian footballer

Personal information
- Date of birth: 16 May 1977 (age 49)
- Place of birth: Craiova, Romania
- Height: 1.81 m (5 ft 11 in)
- Position: Second striker

Youth career
- 1987–1991: FCU Craiova
- 1991–1994: FC Oneşti

Senior career*
Years	Team	Apps	(Gls)
1994–1999	FC Oneşti	117	(27)
1999–2000	Astra Ploiești	23	(5)
2000–2001	Gloria Bistrița	29	(13)
2001	Astra Ploiești	17	(2)
2002	Gloria Bistrița	21	(8)
2002–2004	Astra Ploiești	15	(4)
2003	→ Școlar Reșița (loan)	19	(7)
2004	→ Câmpina (loan)	26	(8)
2005–2006	Petrolul Ploiești	22	(1)
2006	→ Inter Gaz Bucureşti (loan)	28	(8)
2006–2007	Otopeni	26	(3)
2007–2008	Inter Gaz București	29	(7)
2008–2011	Alro Slatina	68	(19)
2011–2012	Caracal	15	(1)
2012	CS Caransebeş	8	(1)
2013	Dunărea Calafat	5	(0)
2014	FC Corabia	9	(2)
2015	FC Jimbolia	4	(0)
2016	Izvorul Târnăveni	17	(6)
2017	Valea lui Mihai	9	(1)
2017	FC Salonta	5	(0)
2018	Tisza Makò	6	(1)
2018–2019	Turnu	18	(4)
2020	Tisza Makò	5	(0)
2021	Vàsas Makò	15	(5)
2022	Nucet	8	(1)
2022–2023	AFC Ghiroda	5	(0)
2023	Dumbrăviţa II	4	(0)
2023	Diniaş	2	(0)
Total		602	(138)
- * Club domestic league appearances and goals

Constantin Bârsan (born 16 May 1977) is a Romanian football striker. (Note: Constantin Bârsan at WorldFootball.net) He became the fourth top goalscorer of Divizia A in 2000–01 with 13 goals.
