= FC Dacia Pitești =

Romanian football club

Dacia Pitești
- Full name: Fotbal Club Dacia Pitești
- Nickname(s): Echipa uzinei (Factory's Team)
- Short name: Dacia
- Founded: 1953 as Metalul Colibași
- Dissolved: 2001 absorbed by Mioveni
- Ground: Dacia
- Capacity: 1,000
- Owner: Automobile Dacia
- 2000–01: Divizia C, Seria V, 6th

Fotbal Club Dacia Pitești, commonly known as Dacia Pitești (IPA: [ˈdatʃi.a piˈteʃtʲ]), was a Romanian football club based in Pitești, Argeș County. Dacia was founded in 1953 under the name of Metalul Colibași, then since 1969 bearing the name of the famous factory Automobile Dacia, owner and main sponsor of the club. The club was dissolved in 2001, as a result of a merge with AS Mioveni, merge by which Dacia was absorbed.

== History ==
Dacia Pitești was founded in 1953 in Mioveni, Argeș County, under the name of Metalul Colibași (Mioveni was named at that time as Colibași). Metalul promoted for the first time in the national divisions at the end of the 1968–69, after winning Argeș County Championship and the promotion play-off against Vagonul Ploiești, the champion of Prahova County (2–1 at Colibași and 0–0 at Ploiești). After promotion, the club entered under the ownership of Automobile Dacia and changed its name to Dacia Pitești, (sometimes known also as Dacia Colibași). Dacia spent six seasons at the level of Divizia C, with a 3rd place, as its best performance, at the end of the 1972–73 season. The boys from the factory relegated at the end of the 1974–75 season, a very weak one for them, ranking 15th of 16.

Dacia promoted back after only one season spent in the county leagues, then followed a long run in the third tier, no less than 12 years, a period in which the club was ranked mostly in the middle of the table, with two exceptions: 2nd place at the end of the 1982–83 season (10 years later from their previous best performance) and 1st place at the end of the 1987–88 season. After this last performance, Dacia promoted for the first time in the Divizia B.

It was a short adventure for the squad of Automobile Dacia, as it would be relegated at the end of the season, after being ranked as 16th of 18, only one point away from the first safe place, occupied by AS Drobeta-Turnu Severin. The boys from Argeș County won Seria VII of Divizia C at the end of 1991–92 season, but missed the promotion after an unsuccessful play-off. Dacia finally promoted back to Divizia B in the summer of 1994 (after an absence of 5 years), as it was crowned champion of Seria III of Divizia C, 11 points over the runner-up, Petrolul Stoina.

The following six years (between 1994 and 2000) it is considered as the best period in the history of the club, Dacia played constantly (with good results) at the level of Divizia B. In this six years, the squad was ranked as it follows: 6th (1994–95), 7th (1995–96), 5th (1996–97), 10th (1997–98), 13th (1998–99) and 4th (1999–2000) – the best result in the history of the club. Also in this period, the club was considered as a feeder club for FC Argeș Pitești.

Ironically, after Dacia obtained the best ranking in its history, the club decided to sell its Divizia B place to Politehnica Timișoara, a club that relegated to the third tier in that season. As a result, Dacia took Politehnica's place in the third tier and also gave up a few players to Timișoara, among them Alin Chița, Cristian Bratu, Marius Diță and Daniel Stanciu. Following these changes, Dacia played for another season at the level of Divizia C (ranked 6th of 15), then in the summer of 2001 the club merged with AS Mioveni. As a result of this merge, Dacia Pitești was absorbed in AS Mioveni, club that was renamed as AS Dacia Mioveni and started to be sponsored by Automobile Dacia.

== Ground ==
Dacia Pitești played its home matches on Stadionul Colibași in Mioveni or on Stadionul Dacia in Ștefănești, both situated in Argeș County and with a capacity of approx. 1,000 seats.

== Honours ==
- Liga III:
  - Winners (3): 1987–88, 1991–92, 1993–94
  - Runners-up (1): 1982–83
- Liga IV – Argeș County:
  - Winners (2): 1968–69, 1975–76

=== Other performances ===
- Appearances in Liga II: 7
- Best finish in Liga II: 4th (1999–2000)
- Best finish in Cupa României: Round of 32 (1975–76)

== League history ==
Season	Tier	Division	Place	Cupa României
2000–01	3	Divizia C	6th	
1999–2000	2	Divizia B	4th (R)	
1998–99	2	Divizia B	13th	
1997–98	2	Divizia B	10th	

Season	Tier	Division	Place	Cupa României
1996–97	2	Divizia B	5th	
1995–96	2	Divizia B	7th	
1994–95	2	Divizia B	6th	
1993–94	3	Divizia C	1st (C, P)	

== Notable former players ==
The footballers enlisted below have had international cap(s) for their respective countries at junior and/or senior level and/or more than 50 caps for FC Dacia Pitești.

- (Romania) Ionuț Badea
- (Romania) Ilie Bărbulescu
- (Romania) Alin Chița
- (Romania) Nicolae Dică
- (Romania) Marius Diță
- (Romania) Adrian Neaga
- (Romania) Andrei Speriatu
- (Romania) Constantin Zamfir
- (Romania) Mihai Zamfir

== Former managers ==
- (Romania) Constantin Popescu (1980–1983)
- (Romania) Mihai Zamfir (2000)
- (Romania) Stelian Badea (1990–1992)
- (Romania) Stelian Badea (1993–2000)
- (Romania) Vasile Stan
