= FC Callatis Mangalia =

Romanian football club

Callatis Mangalia
- Full name: Fotbal Club Callatis Mangalia
- Short name: Callatis
- Founded: 1964 as Metalul Mangalia
- Dissolved: 2015
- Ground: Central
- Capacity: 5,000
Home colours	Away colours

Fotbal Club Callatis Mangalia, commonly known as Callatis Mangalia, was a Romanian professional football club based in Mangalia, Constanța County, founded in 1964 and dissolved in 2015.

== History ==
The club was founded in 1964 under the name Metalul Mangalia and was financially sustained by the Mangalia Shipyard, achieving promotion to the Dobrogea Regional Championship at the end of the 1965–66 season.

Metalul performed solidly in the Regional Championship, finishing 4th in the 1966–67 season and 7th in the 1967–68 season, gradually establishing itself as a competitive side.

In the 1968–69 season, Metalul won the first edition of the Constanța County Championship following the territorial reorganization of the country but failed to secure promotion to the third division, losing to Laromet București, the winner of the București Municipal Championship (0–0 in Mangalia and 0–2 in București).

Metalul promoted to Divizia C at the end of the 1979–80 season, winning the County Championship and the promotion play-off against Victoria Râmnicu Sărat, the Buzău County Championship winner, 8–2 on aggregate (5–2 at home and 3–0 away).

In the third division, Metalul first competed in Series IV, finishing 4th in the 1980–81 season, 10th in the 1981–82 season, and 8th in the 1982–83 season.

In the 1983–84 season, Metalul won Series III, earning promotion to Divizia B for the first time in its history. The team, led by Vasile Mihu as head coach and Dan Dima as assistant coach, was composed of: Dumitru, Jianu, Vodă, Voicu, Greavu, Stoica, Toader, Negure, Sail, Gîrdea, Ali, George Turcu, Irimet, Drăghiceanu, Belu, Stamate, Dedeanu, Căciularu, Carastoian, Isaic, and Simion.

Metalul Mangalia struggled in the second division, finishing 16th in Series I, just two points short of safety, and being relegated after only one season. The following two seasons in Series IV of the third division saw the team fighting to avoid relegation, finishing 12th in the 1985–86 season and improving in the 1986–87 season, ranking 4th.

In the 1987–88 season, Metalul won Series III of Divizia C, returning to the second division after three years of absence. The squad, coached by Vasile Enache with Dan Dima as assistant coach, included the following players: N. Dumitru, Sărăcin, Chera, Cășuneanu, Turcu, Crăciuneanu, Mihăilă, Nedelcu, Gh. Dumitru, Voicu, Năstase, Iordan, Biciu, Macovei, Peteanu, Lazăr, Georges Mihai, Drăghiceanu, Carastoian (17 goals), B. Oprea (10 goals), and Isaic.

The club was immediately relegated back to the third division in the following season, finishing last after a disappointing campaign, despite Ion Carastoian emerging as the top scorer of Series II with 18 goals.

Former logo.

Following the relegation, Metalul merged with Callatis Mangalia—a team from the county championship named after the historical Greek name of the city—and adopted its name. The newly formed team competed in Divizia C during the 1989–90 season, finishing 1st in Series IV and earning promotion to Divizia B.

In Divizia B, Callatis competed in Series I, finishing 11th in the 1990–91 season and 5th in 1991–92 under Mihai Stoichiță. In the 1992–93 season, following the departures of Stoichiță to Autobuzul București and Lavi Hrib to Steaua during the winter break, Callatis appointed Vasile Enache as head coach, who guided the team to an 8th-place finish, followed by a 14th in 1993–94.

The 1994–95 season proved disastrous. Callatis fell to the bottom of the table early on and never recovered. Emil Cațaroș was dismissed after only three rounds, being succeeded by former player Ion Carastoian, who remained in charge for eleven rounds before also being replaced by Gheorghe Drogeanu, who led the team to close a bleak campaign in 18th place, which resulted in relegation.

Callatis began the 2010–11 season with Cristian Cămui as head coach but replaced him in November with Erik Lincar, who guided the team to win Series II of Liga III. The team finished one point ahead of its main rival, Unirea Slobozia, securing a return to the second division after five years.

In the 2011–12 season, Marin Barbu was appointed as head coach, but after disappointing results in the first six rounds, where the team earned only 3 points, he was dismissed. Cristian Șchiopu briefly served as interim coach before Mugurel Cornățeanu took over in October, guiding the team to a 9th-place finish in Series I of Divizia B. However, Callatis faced significant financial difficulties and withdrew from the competition just four days before the start of the following season.

Reorganized in Liga IV – Constanța County, the team led by Mugurel Cornățeanu, finished 1st in the 2012–13 season and earned promotion to Liga III by defeating Voința Cocora 9–1, the Liga IV – Ialomița County winner.

In the third division, Callatis competed in Series II, finishing 8th in the first stage and 9th overall in the 2013–14 season, and 10th in the 2014–15 season. However, due to ongoing financial problems, the team withdrew from Liga III in the summer of 2015.

== Honours ==
Liga III

- Winners (5): 1983–84, 1987–88, 1989–90, 1998–99, 2010–11
- Runners-up (1): 2001–02

Liga IV – Constanța County

- Winners (3): 1968–69, 1979–80, 2012–13

== Notable former players ==
The footballers mentioned below have played at least 1 season for Callatis and also played in Liga I for another team.

- (Romania) Ilie Bărbulescu
- (Romania) Marian Popa
- (Romania) Bănică Oprea
- (Romania) Mugurel Cornățeanu
- (Romania) Lavi Hrib
- (Romania) Ovidiu Stoianof
- (Romania) Adrian Bumbescu

== Former managers ==
- (Romania) Mihai Stoichiță (1991–1992)
- (Romania) Vasile Enache (1993–1994)
- (Romania) Emil Cațaroș (1994)
- (Romania) Ion Carastoian (1994)
- (Romania) Gheorghe Drogeanu (1994–1995)
- (Romania) Daniel Rădulescu (2000–2001)
- (Romania) Ion Dumitru (2001)
- (Romania) Imilian Șerbănică (2003–2005)
- (Romania) Bănică Oprea (2006–2007)
- (Romania) Mugurel Cornățeanu (2008–2009)
- (Romania) Cristian Cămui (2010)
- (Romania) Erik Lincar (2010–2011)
- (Romania) Marin Barbu (2011)
- (Romania) Cristian Șchiopu (2011)
- (Romania) Mugurel Cornățeanu (2011–2013)
- (Romania) Bănică Oprea (2013)
- (Romania) Nicolae Tilihoi
- (Romania) Constantin Gache
- (Romania) Constantin Bârboră
