= Mihai Ilie =

Romanian footballer

Personal information
- Full name: Iulian Mihai Ilie
- Date of birth: 29 November 1972 (age 53)
- Place of birth: Ploieşti, Romania
- Position: Goalkeeper

Senior career*
Years	Team	Apps	(Gls)
1994–1998	Poiana Câmpina	73	(0)
1998–2000	Petrolul Ploieşti	3	(0)
2001–2004	Cimentul Fieni	55	(1)
2004–2011	Dacia Mioveni	74	(0)
- * Club domestic league appearances and goals as of 26 January 2008

Iulian Mihai Ilie (born 29 November 1972, Ploieşti, Romania) is a Romanian football player, who plays as a goalkeeper. He is currently a free agent.
