= Marius Diță =

Romanian footballer

Personal information
- Date of birth: 15 August 1975 (age 51)
- Place of birth: Miroși, Romania
- Height: 1.72 m (5 ft 8 in)
- Positions: Right back; right midfielder

Senior career*
Years	Team	Apps	(Gls)
1995–1999	Dacia Pitești	130	(12)
2000	Argeș Pitești	3	(0)
2000–2001	Politehnica Timișoara	31	(1)
2002–2003	FC Oradea	22	(0)
2003–2004	Dacia Mioveni	15	(0)
2004	Gloria Bistrița	7	(0)
2005	Oltul Slatina		
2005–2006	Universitatea Cluj		
2006–2007	Juventus București		
2010	Girom Albota		
2011–2015	Atletic Bradu		
Total		208+	(13+)
- * Club domestic league appearances and goals as of 2 October 2018

Marius Diță (born 15 August 1975) is a Romanian former professional footballer who played as a defender and midfielder. In his career Diță played in the Liga I for FC Argeș Pitești, but mainly in the Liga II and Liga III for teams such as FC Bihor Oradea, Dacia Mioveni, Gloria Bistrița, Universitatea Cluj or Atletic Bradu, among others.
