= FCM Dinamo Onești =

Romanian football club

Dinamo Onești
- Full name: Fotbal Club Municipal Dinamo Onești
- Nicknames: Oneștenii (The People of Onești); Gruparea de pe Trotuș (The Group from Trotuș)
- Short name: Onești
- Founded: 1994 as FC Onești; 2009 as FCM Onești
- Dissolved: 2004; 2015
- Ground: FC Onești / Energia
- Capacity: 12,000 / 3,000

FCM Dinamo Onești was a Romanian professional football club from Onești, Bacău County, founded in 1994 and dissolved in 2015.

== History ==
The rise of the team from Onești began in the summer of 1987 when Mecon, sustained by IUGTC Onești (The Heavy Equipment Enterprise Transport Construction), with Steluș Roșca on the bench, managed to promoted in Divizia C winning the Bacău County Championship and the promotion play-off against Chimia Victoria 1–0 on aggregate.

With Nicolae Zaharia as coach, he played in the third division in the following seasons, being generally in the top half of the ranking finishing 4th in 1987–88, 5th in 1988–89, 8th in 1989–90 and 10th in 1990–91.

Changing its name to Meconerg, the team continued to play in Divizia C and after the reorganization of the competitive system in the summer of 1992, finishing 4th in 1991–92, 5th in 1992–93 and 7th as Electromecon Onești in the 1993–94 season.

In 1994, Electromecon Onești merge with CSM Borzești to form FC Onești. This merger took place at the initiative of Nicolae Puiu, the president of Electromecon with the support of Simion Albu – manager at that time of RAFO – and of Ion Marian – the leader of the "Rafinorul" syndicate.

In 1994–95 season, he took the 2nd place in the Series I of Divizia C behind Foresta Fălticeni and promoted in Divizia B defeating Flacăra Moreni in the promotion play-off held at Electro-Precizia Stadium in Săcele with a score of 1–0 through the golden goal.

In Divizia B, the team from the Trotuș River competed in Series I, finishing each time in the top half of the table, placing 5th in the first season and 4th in the 1996–97 campaign. In the summer of 1998, FC Onești achieved its first promotion to Divizia A after finishing 2nd in the 1997–98 season, following a close battle with series winners Astra Ploiești, and winning the promotion play-off match held at Nitramonia Stadium in Făgăraș against Electroputere Craiova, 2–1, through Ionel Iriza’s golden goal. The team, coached by Toader Șteț, consisted of Floria, Mandric, Jercălau, Achim, Artimon, Pârvu, Masati, Moldoveanu, Fl. Munteanu, Urâtu, Goiceanu, Bârsan, G. Gorga, Iriza, Decu and D. Oprea.

At the end of his first Divizia A championship, FC Onești took 14th place out of 18 participants. The following year, FC Onești took the 16th place, a relegated position at the end of the championship.

Returned to Divizia B, Onești competed in Series I, finishing 10th in the 2000–01 season and 7th in 2001–02. In the 2002–03 season, the team was initially coached by Jean Gavrilă, but he was dismissed at the end of October, when the team was just one point behind leaders Politehnica Iași after nine rounds, and he was replaced by Petre Grigoraș, who led the team to a 3rd-place finish.

The club was dissolved in the middle of the 2003–04 Divizia B season, after its main sponsor, RAFO, withdrew its support. The club was refounded in 2009 under the name of FCM Onești. In the summer of 2012, the club was renamed once again, as FCM Dinamo Onești. For three years the club played in Liga IV. The club was dissolved once again, in 2015.

== Chronology of names ==
Name	Period
FC Onești	1994–2004
FCM Onești	2009–2012
Dinamo Onești	2012–2015

== Honours ==
Liga II

- Runners-up (1): 1997–98

Liga III

- Runners-up (1):1994–95

Liga IV – Bacău County

- Winners (1): 1986–87

== Notable players ==
- (Romania) Valeriu Răchită
- (Romania) Ionel Pârvu
- (Romania) Vasile Jercălău
- (Romania) Alin Artimon
- (Romania) Adrian Blid
- (Romania) Daniel Scînteie
- (Romania) Ionel Iriza
- (Romania) Giani Gorga
- (Romania) Dănuț Oprea
- (Romania) Constantin Bârsan
- (Romania) Marius Bilașco
- (Albania) Altin Masati

== Former managers ==
- (Romania) Toader Șteț (1995–1999)
- (Romania) Alexandru Moldovan (2000)
- (Romania) Jean Gavrilă (2002)
- (Romania) Petre Grigoraș (2002–2003)
- (Romania) Nicolae Zaharia
