= Lavi Hrib =

Romanian footballer

Personal information
- Full name: Ion Lavi Hrib
- Date of birth: 23 February 1973 (age 53)
- Place of birth: Constanța, Romania
- Height: 1.84 m (6 ft 0 in)
- Position: Forward

Team information
- Current team: Astra Giurgiu (technical director)

Senior career*
Years	Team	Apps	(Gls)
1992	Callatis Mangalia		
1993	Steaua București	2	(0)
1993	Farul Constanța	11	(0)
1994	Sportul Studențesc București	13	(2)
1994–1995	Rocar București	25	(10)
1995–1997	FC Brașov	49	(10)
1997–1998	Steaua București	25	(1)
1999	Universitatea Craiova	11	(2)
1999	Național București	13	(0)
2000	Ceahlăul Piatra Neamț	16	(0)
2001	Național București	6	(1)
2001	Hapoel Tzafririm Holon		
2002	Astra Ploiești	5	(0)
2002–2003	Farul Constanța	9	(0)
2003–2004	Cosenza		
2005	FC Brașov	2	(0)
Total		187	(26)

Managerial career
- 2009–2011: CS Buftea
- 2011–2012: CS Buftea
- 2022: Astra Giurgiu (technical director)
- * Club domestic league appearances and goals

Ion Lavi Hrib (born 23 February 1973) is a Romanian former football defender. After he ended his playing career, he worked for a while as a manager.

== Honours ==
=== Player ===
Steaua București

- Divizia A: 1992–93, 1997–98
- Cupa României: 1998–99

=== Manager ===
CS Buftea

- Liga III: 2011–12
