= FC Onești Stadium =

Multi-use stadium in Onești, Romania

- Former names: Mecon
- Location: Onești, Romania
- Capacity: 12,000
- Surface: grass

Construction
- Groundbreaking: 1988
- Opened: 1991
- Renovated: 1995

Tenant
- FC Onești (1954–2004)

The FC Onești Stadium is a multi-use stadium in Onești, Bacău County, Romania, and was the home ground of the defunct FC Onești. Construction began in 1988 at the initiative of engineer Nicolae Wilhelm as an alternative to the city’s existing sports facilities. Built largely with salvaged materials and with the labor of employees from the Întreprinderea de Utilaj Greu Transport pentru Construcții (lit. 'Heavy Equipment Transport Enterprise for Construction'), the stadium was designed as a modern venue for its level, featuring a quality playing field and an efficient drainage system, and was completed in 1989.

During the 1990s, it served as the city’s main sports facility, with a capacity of approximately 12,000 spectators, hosting Romanian top division matches. Following the dissolution of FC Onești in the early 2000s, the stadium fell into a state of decline, with deteriorating stands and seating, rusting infrastructure, and overgrown field and surrounding areas.
