= Marin Barbu =

Romanian footballer (born 1958)

Personal information
- Date of birth: 5 April 1958 (age 68)
- Place of birth: Bucharest, Romania
- Height: 1.67 m (5 ft 6 in)
- Position: Midfielder

Youth career
- 1970–1976: Steaua București
- 1976–1977: Spartac București

Senior career*
Years	Team	Apps	(Gls)
1977–1978	Șoimii Sibiu		
1979–1981	Oltul Sfântu Gheorghe		
1982–1983	Steaua București	32	(2)
1983	Olt Scornicești	15	(0)
1984–1985	IMASA Sfântu Gheorghe	15	(0)
1985–1991	FCM Brașov	154	(42)
1991–1992	Tractorul Brașov		
1992–1994	IMASA Sfântu Gheorghe		
1994–1995	Precizia Săcele		
Total		201	(44)

Managerial career
- 1992–1994: IMASA Sfântu Gheorghe (player/coach)
- 1994–1997: Precizia Săcele (player/coach)
- 1997: Foresta Fălticeni
- 1998: FC Brașov
- 1999–2001: Foresta Suceava
- 2001: Petrolul Ploiești
- 2002: Ceahlăul Piatra Neamț
- 2002–2003: Politehnica Iași
- 2003–2005: Juventus București
- 2005–2006: Ceahlăul Piatra Neamț
- 2006–2007: Petrolul Ploiești
- 2007–2008: UTA Arad
- 2008–2010: Dunărea Giurgiu
- 2010: Astra Ploiești
- 2010–2011: Ceahlăul Piatra Neamț
- 2011: Callatis Mangalia
- 2012: SC Bacău
- 2013: Astra Giurgiu
- 2013: Rapid CFR Suceava
- 2014: Ceahlăul Piatra Neamț
- 2015: US Chaouia
- 2015: Juventus București
- 2015–2017: Juventus București (technical director)
- 2015–2018: Juventus București (youth)
- 2019: Sepsi OSK (caretaker)
- * Club domestic league appearances and goals

Marin Barbu (born 5 April 1958) is a Romanian football coach and former footballer. During his football career, Marin Barbu played, among others, for Steaua București and FCM Brașov.

== Coaching career ==
Barbu left his position as head coach of Dunărea Giurgiu on 12 January 2010.

In April 2013, he was the head coach of Astra Giurgiu for only one game, being dismissed after a week.

From April 2014 till August 2014 he was the head coach of Ceahlăul Piatra Neamț.

== Honours ==
=== Player ===
Oltul Sfântu Gheorghe

- Divizia C: 1979–80

=== Manager ===
IMASA Sfântu Gheorghe

- Divizia D – Covasna County: 1992–93

Precizia Săcele

- Divizia C: 1995–96
- Divizia D – Brașov County: 1994–95

Foresta Suceava

- Divizia B: 1999–00
