= Marius Păcurar =

Romanian footballer

Personal information
- Date of birth: 15 July 1974 (age 52)
- Place of birth: Pui, Romania
- Height: 1.80 m (5 ft 11 in)
- Position: Striker

Youth career
- 1984–1992: Corvinul Hunedoara

Senior career*
| Years | Team | Apps | (Gls) |
| 1992–1999 | Corvinul Hunedoara | 168 | (44) |
| 1999–2002 | Foresta Fălticeni | 81 | (29) |
| 2002–2005 | Politehnica Iași | 73 | (12) |
| 2005–2006 | Corvinul 2005 | 35 | (14) |
| 2007 | Dacia Mioveni | 10 | (1) |
| 2007 | Mureșul Deva | 11 | (4) |
| 2008 | Corvinul 2005 | 15 | (1) |
| 2008–2011 | CFR Simeria | – | (4) |
| Total | | 393 | (109) |

Managerial career
- 2011–2012: CFR Simeria (assistant)
- 2012–2014: Hunedoara (assistant)
- * Club domestic league appearances and goals as of 25 April 2020

Marius Păcurar (born 15 July 1974) is a Romanian former footballer who played as a striker for teams such as Corvinul Hunedoara, Foresta Fălticeni, Politehnica Iași or CFR Simeria, among others.

== Honours ==
Foresta Fălticeni

- Divizia B: Winner (1) 1999–2000

Politehnica Iași

- Divizia B: Winner (1) 2003–04

=== Other performances ===
Corvinul Hunedoara

- Divizia B: Top scorer 1993–94
