= Foresta Fălticeni =

Association football club

- Full name: Foresta Fălticeni
- Founded: 1954
- Dissolved: 2003
- Ground: Areni, Suceava; Nada Florilor, Fălticeni
- Capacity: 12,500; 10,000
Home colours	Away colours

Foresta Fălticeni (also known as Foresta Suceava) was a Romanian professional football club from Fălticeni, Suceava County, Romania, founded in 1954 as Avântul Fălticeni and subsequently dissolved in 2003.

== History ==
The club was founded in 1954 in Fălticeni under the name of Avântul Fălticeni.

Playing in the Divizia C, Foresta reached the 1966–67 Romanian Cup final, becoming, according to The Playmaker, the first third-division team to do so. After eliminating Steagul Roșu Brașov and, on the age criterion then used to decide drawn ties, Politehnica Timișoara and Politehnica Iași, Foresta beat the reigning champions Rapid București 1–0 in the semi-final. The final, played on 2 July 1967 at the Stadionul Republicii in Bucharest before 20,000 spectators, was won 6–0 by Steaua București.

In 1997, the club was moved to Suceava after it won the promotion to the Divizia A for the first time in history. The main reason for the move was the inadequate state of Foresta's stadium in Fălticeni, which was both small and had a cracked stand. Another reason for the move was, that the main team in the city, CSM Suceava had failed to achieve any notable performances during the previous decade.

During its three seasons in the Divizia A, the club played as Foresta Suceava. The promotion of 1997 was achieved under the businessman Eugen Huțu, who financed the club and also ran the bazaar in Suceava; in 2004 Huțu said that he had invested more than two million US dollars of his own money in Foresta since 1999. On 11 November 2000, in the 13th round of the 2000–01 season, Foresta won 5–4 away against reigning champions Dinamo București, after the hosts had led 4–0 until the 62nd minute. Tinel Petre, Adrian Mihalcea, Iulian Tameș and Marius Niculae scored for Dinamo, while Robert Niță (two goals, including the winner in the last minute), Marius Păcurar and Mihai Botan (two goals) scored for Foresta. The teams were managed by Cornel Dinu (Dinamo) and Marin Barbu (Foresta), and the match was broadcast by Acasă TV. According to Niță, each Foresta player received a bonus of 2,000 dollars after the match, and he received 4,000. Foresta finished the season in 13th place, the best league finish in the club's history, and was relegated after losing the relegation play-off against FC Baia Mare on the away goals rule.

Before it was dissolved in 2003 it moved back to Fălticeni to play the last matches in its history there. In 1997 Foresta merged with the team from Suceava and played in the Divizia A as NC Foresta Suceava. According to Monitorul de Suceava, the club's decline began in 2001, when owner Eugen Huțu no longer received support from the local and county authorities. After relegation in 2001, Foresta Suceava finished ninth in Series 1 of the 2001–02 Divizia B. The team returned to Fălticeni for its last matches and, as Foresta Fălticeni, finished 15th and was relegated in 2002–03. It was excluded from the championship before the 2003–04 season, after which it no longer took part in competitions.

== Stadium ==
The club played its home matches at a stadium in Fălticeni inaugurated in 1982 with a match between the local team and the Romania national football team, then coached by Mircea Lucescu. The match was played in the summer of 1982, while the national team was at a training camp in Câmpulung Moldovenesc, and ended 7–1 (1–0) to the national team in front of 6,000 spectators; Foresta's goal was scored by Croitoru in the final minute. The stadium had a capacity of 10,000 and was originally named "Chimia", as many of the residents who had worked voluntarily on its construction were employees of the town's chemical factory; for the same reason, the team was renamed Chimia Fălticeni. After 1989 both the team and the stadium rename again Foresta, and the authorities later renamed the stadium "Nada Florilor".

After the club ceased to exist, the stadium was no longer used for competitions. As early as 2015, Digi24 reported that the ends of the stand had begun to collapse because of landslides, and the mayor said that no administration since 1989 had made its renovation a priority. According to Monitorul de Suceava, by 2021 the ends of the stand were collapsing to collapse because of landslides and the pitch was uneven; the ground had not been modernized since 1982. The same year, the municipality announced a project to refurbish the changing rooms and accommodation with external funding.

== Honours ==
Liga I:

- Best finish: 13th 2000–01

Liga II

- Winners (2): 1996–97, 1999–2000
- Runners-up (1): 1995–96

Liga III

- Winners (5): 1956, 1973–74, 1982–83, 1988–89, 1994–95
- Runners-up (3): 1968–69, 1979–80, 1980–81

Cupa României

- Winners (0):
- Runners-up (1): 1966–67

== Chronology of names ==
Name	Period
Avântul Fălticeni	1954–1956
Recolta Fălticeni	1956
Energia Fălticeni	1957
Foresta Fălticeni	1957–1982
Chimia Fălticeni	1982–1989
Foresta Fălticeni	1989–1997
Foresta Suceava	1997–2002
Foresta Fălticeni	2003

== Former managers ==
- (Romania) Gheorghe Albu (1958–1959)
- (Romania) Iosif Lengheriu (1966–1967)
- (Romania) Marin Barbu (1997)
- (Romania) Marian Bondrea (1998–1999)
- (Romania) Marin Barbu (1999–2001)
- (Romania) Ionel Iuga
- (Romania) Nicolae Babeti
- (Romania) Vasile Florea
- (Romania) Nicolae Constantin
- (Romania) Cristian Antoniu
- (Romania) Cornel Anton
- (Romania) Ion Buzoianu
- (Romania) Constantin Jamaischi
