= Sorin Mogoșanu =

Romanian professional footballer

Personal information
- Full name: Sorin Răducu Mogoșanu
- Date of birth: 22 November 1992 (age 33)
- Place of birth: Craiova, Romania
- Height: 1.80 m (5 ft 11 in)
- Position: Goalkeeper

Youth career
- Școala de Fotbal Gheorghe Popescu

Senior career*
Years	Team	Apps	(Gls)
2010	Triumf Bârca		
2010–2011	Drobeta-Turnu Severin	1	(0)
2011	CS Vișina Nouă		
2011–2013	FC Caracal	12	(0)
2013–2015	Olt Slatina	25	(0)
2016–2017	Filiași	25	(0)
2017	SV Hebertsfelden		
2018–2025	FC U Craiova	22	(0)

Managerial career
- 2025: FC U Craiova (player/GK coach)
- * Club domestic league appearances and goals as of 29 March 2025

Sorin Răducu Mogoșanu (born 22 November 1992) is a Romanian professional footballer who plays as a goalkeeper.

== Career ==
Mogoșanu has played for FC Drobeta-Turnu Severin, FC Caracal, FC Olt Slatina, and CSO Filiași, among others. In Romania, Mogoșanu played only for football clubs based in the Oltenia region, but he also had a spell in Germany, where he played for lower division club SV Hebertsfelden.

== Honours ==
FC U Craiova

- Liga II: 2020–21
- Liga III: 2019–20
- Liga IV – Dolj County: 2017–18
- Cupa României – Dolj County: 2017–18
