= 2005–06 Divizia C =

Third tier Romanian football league

Divizia C
- Season: 2005–06

The 2005–06 Divizia C was the 50th season of Liga III, the third tier of the Romanian football league system.

== Team changes ==
=== To Divizia C ===
Relegated from Divizia B

- Ghimbav
- Unirea Focșani
- Politehnica Timișoara
- Building Vânju Mare
- Oltul Slatina
- Rulmentul Alexandria
- Oașul Negrești-Oaș
- ACU Arad
- Corvinul Hunedoara

Promoted from Divizia D

- Willy Bacău
- ~~Viitorul Târgu Frumos~~
- Viitorul Liteni
- Botoșani II
- Flacăra Brusturi
- Delta Tulcea
- Politehnica Galați
- Abatorul Slobozia
- Hidro-Metalcord Buzău
- Făurei
- Axiopolis Cernavodă
- 1 Decembrie
- Argeșul Mihăilești
- Sportul Studențesc București II
- Prima Guard Alexandria
- Dacia Mioveni II
- Alprom Slatina
- Dunărea Calafat
- Agromec Șimian
- Sebeș
- Minerul Uricani
- Gilortul Târgu Cărbunești
- Sibiu II
- Lotru Brezoi
- Calor Timișoara
- Lotus Băile Felix
- Gloria CTP Arad
- Muncitorul Reșița
- Sănătatea Cluj
- Fink Fenster Petrești
- Marmația Sighetu Marmației
- Rapid Jibou
- Știința Sărmaș-Toplița
- Trans-Sil Târgu Mureș
- Matizol Ploiești
- ~~Minerul Rodna~~
- ~~Venus Independența~~
- ~~Baraolt~~
- ~~Gloria Cornești~~
- ~~Flacăra Muntenii de Sus~~
- ~~Dorecom Reghiu~~
- ~~Cetatea Apața~~

=== From Divizia C ===
Promoted to Divizia B

- Cetatea Suceava
- Portul Constanța
- Dunărea Giurgiu
- Poiana Câmpina
- Râmnicu Vâlcea
- CFR Timișoara
- Minerul Lupeni
- Forex Brașov
- Gloria Bistrița II

Relegated to Divizia D

- Cimentul Bicaz
- Ceahlăul Piatra Neamț II
- ~~Huși~~
- Bucovina Rădăuți
- Foresta Nehoiu
- Medgidia
- Partener Slobozia
- Start Corolla Movila Miresei
- Petrolul Bolintin-Vale
- Aversa București
- Faur București
- Dunărea Zimnicea
- Utchim Găești
- Carpați Sinaia
- Arpechim Pitești
- Petrolul Țicleni
- Prodchim Balș
- Electro Craiova
- ~~Arsenal Motru~~
- ~~Minerul Moldova Nouă~~
- Gloria Reșița
- Universitatea Sopo Sibiu
- Frontiera Curtici
- ~~Inter Petrila~~
- ENA Făgăraș
- Victoria Mantrax Bod
- ~~KSE Târgu Secuiesc~~
- ~~Predeal~~
- ~~Știința Cluj~~
- Suciu de Sus
- Gloria Renel Baia Mare

=== Renamed teams ===
Șoimii Vulturu was renamed Energia Vulturu.

Olimpia Râmnicu Sărat was renamed CSM Râmnicu Sărat.

Avântul Silva Reghin was renamed Avântul Reghin.

Telecom Arad was renamed Romtelecom Arad.

Lotus Băile Felix was renamed Lotus Sânmartin.

ASA Târgu Mureș was renames Maris Târgu Mureș.

=== Other changes ===
Viitorul Târgu Frumos sold its place to Leonard Pașcani.

Flacăra Muntenii de Sus sold its place to FCM Huși.

Prima Guard Alexandria was moved from Alexandria to Zimnicea and renamed Prima Guard Zimnicea.

Navol Oltenița sold its place to Gloria ANEFS București.

Știința CFR Craiova sold its place to Arsenal Motru.

Minerul Sărmășag were replaced by Știința Cluj.

Minerul Bălan were replaced by FC Predeal.

CS Buftea bought the place of Cimentul Fieni.

Tricotaje Ineu sold its place in second tier to FCM Reșița, bought the place of Universitatea Reșița in the third tier and renamed CS Ineu.

CS Deva sold its place in the second tier to Corvinul 2005 Hunedoara at the end of the previous season, and took the place of FC Jimbolia in the third tier. As a result, their satellite CS Deva II, who were also playing in the third tier, were removed. To fill their spot, Inter Petrila was sparred from relegation.

Unirea Slobozia, Prefabricate Modelu, Unirea Urziceni II, Victoria Lehliu, Minerul Moldova Nouă, Inter Petrila, KSE Târgu Secuiesc bought a place.

Minerul Rodna, Venus Independența, Baraolt, Gloria Cornești, Flacăra Muntenii de Sus, Dorecom Reghiu and Cetatea Apața sold their place.

== League tables ==
=== Seria I ===
Pos	Team	Pld	W	D	L	GF	GA	GD	Pts	Qualification or relegation
1	Politehnica Iași II (C, P)	26	18	3	5	47	18	+29	57	Promotion to Liga II
2	CFR Pașcani	26	13	9	4	33	11	+22	48	
3	FCM Bacău II	26	13	7	6	32	17	+15	46	
4	Aerostar Bacău	26	13	5	8	35	25	+10	44	
5	Energia Vulturu	26	12	3	11	38	23	+15	39	
6	Willy Bacău	26	11	6	9	31	27	+4	39	
7	Leonard Pașcani	26	12	3	11	34	36	−2	39	
8	Viitorul Liteni	26	10	8	8	28	24	+4	38	
9	Pambac Bacău	26	9	10	7	26	19	+7	37	
10	Rulmentul Bârlad (R)	26	9	7	10	29	29	0	34	Relegation to Liga IV
11	Huși (R)	26	8	5	13	22	37	−15	29	Relegation to Liga IV
12	Dorna Vatra Dornei (R)	26	6	9	11	27	37	−10	27	Relegation to Liga IV
13	Botoșani II (R)	26	4	4	18	21	67	−46	16	Relegation to Liga IV
14	Flacăra Brusturi (R)	26	3	3	20	25	58	−33	12	Relegation to Liga IV

Source: romaniansoccer.ro
Rules for classification: 1) Points; 2) Goal difference; 3) Number of goals scored.
(C) Champions; (P) Promoted; (R) Relegated

=== Seria II ===
Pos	Team	Pld	W	D	L	GF	GA	GD	Pts	Qualification or relegation
1	Delta Tulcea (C, P)	26	22	2	2	73	14	+59	68	Promotion to Liga II
2	Râmnicu Sărat	26	14	6	6	33	23	+10	48	
3	Petrolul Brăila	26	14	4	8	57	36	+21	46	
4	Junkers Galați	26	14	4	8	47	28	+19	46	
5	Politehnica Galați	26	13	4	9	49	30	+19	43	
6	Oil Terminal Constanța	26	11	5	10	39	34	+5	38	
7	Unirea Slobozia	26	12	2	12	39	42	−3	38	
8	Aurora 23 August	26	10	7	9	28	27	+1	37	
9	Farul Constanța II	26	11	4	11	36	41	−5	37	
10	Abatorul Slobozia (R)	26	9	4	13	29	55	−26	31	Relegation to Liga IV
11	Petrolul Berca (R)	26	7	8	11	34	39	−5	29	Relegation to Liga IV
12	Hidro-Metalcord Buzău (R)	26	7	4	15	26	50	−24	25	Relegation to Liga IV
13	Făurei (R)	26	6	5	15	33	60	−27	23	Relegation to Liga IV
14	Axiopolis Cernavodă (R)	26	2	1	23	15	59	−44	7	Relegation to Liga IV

Source: romaniansoccer.ro
Rules for classification: 1) Points; 2) Goal difference; 3) Number of goals scored.
(C) Champions; (P) Promoted; (R) Relegated

=== Seria III ===
Pos	Team	Pld	W	D	L	GF	GA	GD	Pts	Qualification or relegation
1	Snagov (C, P)	26	19	1	6	48	19	+29	58	Promotion to Liga II
2	Dunărea Călărași	26	16	2	8	51	30	+21	50	
3	Prefabricate Modelu	26	15	4	7	44	23	+21	49	
4	Mogoșoaia	26	14	5	7	40	21	+19	47	
5	Chitila	26	14	5	7	43	34	+9	47	
6	Buftea	26	12	4	10	44	33	+11	40	
7	1 Decembrie	26	12	4	10	45	42	+3	40	
8	Clinceni	26	10	8	8	27	33	−6	38	
9	Argeșul Mihăilești	26	11	4	11	39	38	+1	37	
10	Gloria ANEFS București (R)	26	7	7	12	38	42	−4	28	Relegation to Liga IV
11	Politehnica Timișoara	26	9	5	12	38	40	−2	23 (Note: AFC Poli Timișoara were deducted 9 points for failing to reach the minimum points threshold in Divizia B last season.)	Relegation to Liga IV
12	Sportul Studențesc București II (R)	26	5	6	15	23	33	−10	21	Relegation to Liga IV
13	Unirea Urziceni II (Note: Unirea Urziceni II and Victoria Lehliu withdrew from the championship at the end of the first half of the season and lost all second-half matches 0–3.) (R)	25	4	5	16	22	50	−28	17	Relegation to Liga IV
14	Victoria Lehliu (R)	25	2	2	21	14	78	−64	8	Relegation to Liga IV

Source: romaniansoccer.ro
Rules for classification: 1) Points; 2) Goal difference; 3) Number of goals scored.
(C) Champions; (P) Promoted; (R) Relegated

=== Seria IV ===
Pos	Team	Pld	W	D	L	GF	GA	GD	Pts	Qualification or relegation
1	Chimia Brazi (C, P)	26	20	3	3	42	14	+28	63	Promotion to Liga II
2	Tricolorul Breaza	26	13	6	7	34	20	+14	45	
3	Petrolistul Boldești	26	14	2	10	39	20	+19	44	
4	Electrosid Titu	26	12	8	6	33	23	+10	44	
5	Conpet Ploiești	26	12	8	6	27	19	+8	44	
6	FCSB II	26	10	8	8	39	24	+15	38	
7	Flacăra Moreni	26	9	9	8	32	23	+9	36	
8	Petrolul Târgoviște	26	10	6	10	30	28	+2	36	
9	ROVA Roșiori	26	9	7	10	30	34	−4	34	
10	Petrolul Videle (R)	26	8	7	11	19	30	−11	31	Relegation to Liga IV
11	Prima Guard Zimnicea (R)	26	9	3	14	22	36	−14	30	Relegation to Liga IV
12	Dacia Mioveni II (R)	26	6	9	11	24	27	−3	27	Relegation to Liga IV
13	Turris Turnu Măgurele (R)	26	4	6	16	22	55	−33	18	Relegation to Liga IV
14	Rulmentul Alexandria (R)	26	5	0	21	12	52	−40	6 (Note: Rulmentul Alexandria were deducted 9 points for failing to reach the minimum points threshold in Divizia B last season.)	Relegation to Liga IV

Source: romaniansoccer.ro
Rules for classification: 1) Points; 2) Goal difference; 3) Number of goals scored.
(C) Champions; (P) Promoted; (R) Relegated

=== Seria V ===
Pos	Team	Pld	W	D	L	GF	GA	GD	Pts	Qualification or relegation
1	Building Vânju Mare (C, P)	26	20	4	2	50	8	+42	64	Promotion to Liga II
2	Alprom Slatina	26	18	4	4	43	11	+32	58	
3	Armata Craiova	26	15	5	6	42	16	+26	50	
4	Minerul Mehedinți	26	14	4	8	52	25	+27	46	
5	Chimia Craiova	26	13	5	8	47	28	+19	44	
6	Dunărea Calafat	26	11	9	6	40	22	+18	42	
7	Progresul Corabia	26	12	5	9	55	42	+13	41	
8	Oltul Slatina	26	10	7	9	31	24	+7	37	
9	ȘF "Gică Popescu" Craiova	26	11	3	12	34	31	+3	36	
10	Severnav Drobeta-Turnu Severin (R)	26	11	0	15	34	51	−17	33	Relegation to Liga IV
11	U Craiova II (R)	26	7	5	14	29	38	−9	26	Relegation to Liga IV
12	Olt Scornicești (R)	26	7	5	14	29	61	−32	26	Relegation to Liga IV
13	Arsenal Motru (Note: Arsenal Motru and Agromec Șimian were excluded from the championship and lost all second-half matches 0–3.) (R)	26	2	3	21	11	74	−63	9	Relegation to Liga IV
14	Agromec Șimian (R)	26	0	3	23	5	71	−66	3	Relegation to Liga IV

Source: romaniansoccer.ro
Rules for classification: 1) Points; 2) Goal difference; 3) Number of goals scored.
(C) Champions; (P) Promoted; (R) Relegated

=== Seria VI ===
Pos	Team	Pld	W	D	L	GF	GA	GD	Pts	Qualification or relegation
1	Oltchim Râmnicu Vâlcea (C, P)	26	21	1	4	69	16	+53	64	Promotion to Liga II
2	Soda Ocna Mureș	26	15	4	7	37	26	+11	49	
3	Vulcan	26	15	3	8	47	21	+26	48	
4	Sebeș	26	13	6	7	46	30	+16	45	
5	Inter Blaj	26	12	8	6	33	26	+7	44	
6	Sparta Mediaș	26	13	4	9	53	32	+21	43	
7	EMC Rovinari	26	13	4	9	27	23	+4	43	
8	Minerul Uricani	26	13	3	10	42	35	+7	42	
9	Minerul Mătăsari	26	12	5	9	31	23	+8	41	
10	Inter Petrila (R)	26	8	5	13	31	43	−12	29	Relegation to Liga IV
11	Metalul Aiud (R)	26	6	8	12	22	41	−19	26	Relegation to Liga IV
12	Gilortul Târgu Cărbunești (R)	26	5	4	17	23	72	−49	19	Relegation to Liga IV
13	Sibiu II (R)	26	3	3	20	24	60	−36	12	Relegation to Liga IV
14	Lotru Brezoi (R)	26	2	4	20	25	62	−37	10	Relegation to Liga IV

Source: romaniansoccer.ro
Rules for classification: 1) Points; 2) Goal difference; 3) Number of goals scored.
(C) Champions; (P) Promoted; (R) Relegated

=== Seria VII ===
Pos	Team	Pld	W	D	L	GF	GA	GD	Pts	Qualification or relegation
1	Auxerre Lugoj (C, P)	26	16	8	2	30	9	+21	56	Promotion to Liga II
2	UM Timișoara	26	14	7	5	47	22	+25	49	
3	Hexe Jebel Timișoara	26	14	4	8	58	29	+29	46	
4	Victoria Nădlac	26	11	7	8	31	32	−1	40	
5	Calor Timișoara	26	12	3	11	49	34	+15	39	
6	Lotus Sânmartin	26	11	3	12	33	33	0	36	
7	Bihorul Beiuș	26	10	6	10	24	31	−7	36	
8	Ineu	26	9	6	11	30	39	−9	33	
9	Gloria CTP Arad	26	9	6	11	24	39	−15	33	
10	Muncitorul Reșița (R)	26	9	4	13	34	40	−6	31	Relegation to Liga IV
11	Minerul Moldova Nouă (R)	26	8	6	12	21	30	−9	30	Relegation to Liga IV
12	Deva (R)	26	8	5	13	29	30	−1	29	Relegation to Liga IV
13	Romtelecom Arad (R)	26	8	3	15	31	53	−22	27	Relegation to Liga IV
14	ACU Arad (R)	26	6	6	14	21	41	−20	16 (Note: ACU Arad were deducted 8 points for failing to reach the minimum points threshold in Divizia B last season.)	Relegation to Liga IV

Source: romaniansoccer.ro
Rules for classification: 1) Points; 2) Goal difference; 3) Number of goals scored.
(C) Champions; (P) Promoted; (R) Relegated

=== Seria VIII ===
Pos	Team	Pld	W	D	L	GF	GA	GD	Pts	Qualification or relegation
1	Baia Mare (C, P)	24	19	1	4	52	13	+39	58	Promotion to Liga II
2	Victoria Carei	24	15	2	7	62	29	+33	47	
3	Sănătatea Cluj	24	14	4	6	41	30	+11	46	
4	Arieșul Turda	24	14	3	7	54	19	+35	45	
5	Avântul Reghin	24	12	4	8	32	25	+7	40	
6	Someș Gaz Beclean	24	12	4	8	40	35	+5	40	
7	Someșul Satu Mare	24	10	6	8	30	27	+3	36	
8	Fink Fenster Petrești	24	10	5	9	34	34	0	35	
9	Florența Odoreu	24	9	4	11	31	41	−10	31	
10	Marmația Sighetu Marmației (R)	24	6	6	12	27	45	−18	24	Relegation to Liga IV
11	Rapid Jibou (R)	24	6	4	14	21	44	−23	22	Relegation to Liga IV
12	Oașul Negrești-Oaș (R)	24	4	1	19	19	56	−37	13	Relegation to Liga IV
13	Știința Cluj (R)	24	1	4	19	12	57	−45	7	Relegation to Liga IV
14	Olimpia Gherla (Note: Olimpia Gherla withdrew before the start of the season.) (D)	0	0	0	0	0	0	0	0	Withdrew

Source: romaniansoccer.ro
Rules for classification: 1) Points; 2) Goal difference; 3) Number of goals scored.
(C) Champions; (D) Disqualified; (P) Promoted; (R) Relegated

=== Seria IX ===
Pos	Team	Pld	W	D	L	GF	GA	GD	Pts	Qualification or relegation
1	Ghimbav (C)	26	17	4	5	57	18	+39	55	Ineligible for promotion (Note: Ghimbav were ineligible for promotion due to their association with FC Brașov, which was playing in Liga II.)
2	Tractorul Brașov (P)	26	14	8	4	43	23	+20	50	Promotion to Liga II
3	Predeal	26	13	7	6	46	22	+24	46	
4	Lacul Ursu Mobila Sovata	26	13	4	9	31	26	+5	43	
5	Mureșul Luduș	26	12	4	10	36	27	+9	40	
6	Știința Sărmaș-Toplița	26	12	4	10	44	41	+3	40	
7	Trans-Sil Târgu Mureș	26	12	4	10	33	31	+2	40	
8	Matizol Ploiești	26	13	1	12	34	41	−7	40	
9	KSE Târgu Secuiesc	26	11	6	9	33	27	+6	39	
10	Transkurier Sfântu Gheorghe (R)	26	11	6	9	32	27	+5	39	Relegation to Liga IV
11	Maris Târgu Mureș (R)	26	10	4	12	25	29	−4	34	Relegation to Liga IV
12	Gaz Metan Târgu Mureș (R)	26	10	2	14	31	39	−8	32	Relegation to Liga IV
13	Chimica Târnăveni (R)	26	2	4	20	13	60	−47	10	Relegation to Liga IV
14	Unirea Ungheni (Note: Unirea Ungheni withdrew from the championship at the end of the first half of the season and lost all second-half matches 0–3.) (R)	26	1	4	21	13	60	−47	7	Relegation to Liga IV

Source: romaniansoccer.ro
Rules for classification: 1) Points; 2) Goal difference; 3) Number of goals scored.
(C) Champions; (P) Promoted; (R) Relegated

== See also ==
- 2005–06 Divizia A
- 2005–06 Divizia B
- 2005–06 Divizia D
- 2005–06 Cupa României
