= Stadionul Orășenesc (Filiași) =

Romanian stadium

- Interactive map of Stadionul Orășenesc
- Address: Str. Stadionului 84
- Location: Filiași, Romania
- Coordinates: 44°33′35.0″N 23°31′35.6″E
- Owner: Town of Filiași
- Operator: CSO Filiași
- Capacity: 1,360 seated
- Surface: Grass
- Field size: 102 m × 64 m (112 yd × 70 yd)

Construction
- Opened: 2019
- Cost: € 246,500

Tenants
- Filiași (2019–present); Luceafărul Filiași (2019–present)

Stadionul Orășenesc is a multi-purpose stadium in Filiași, Romania. It is currently used mostly for football matches, is the home ground of CSO Filiași and Luceafărul Filiași. The stadium was opened in 2019 and has a capacity of 1,360 seats.
