= Tudor Mihail =

Romanian footballer (born 1984)

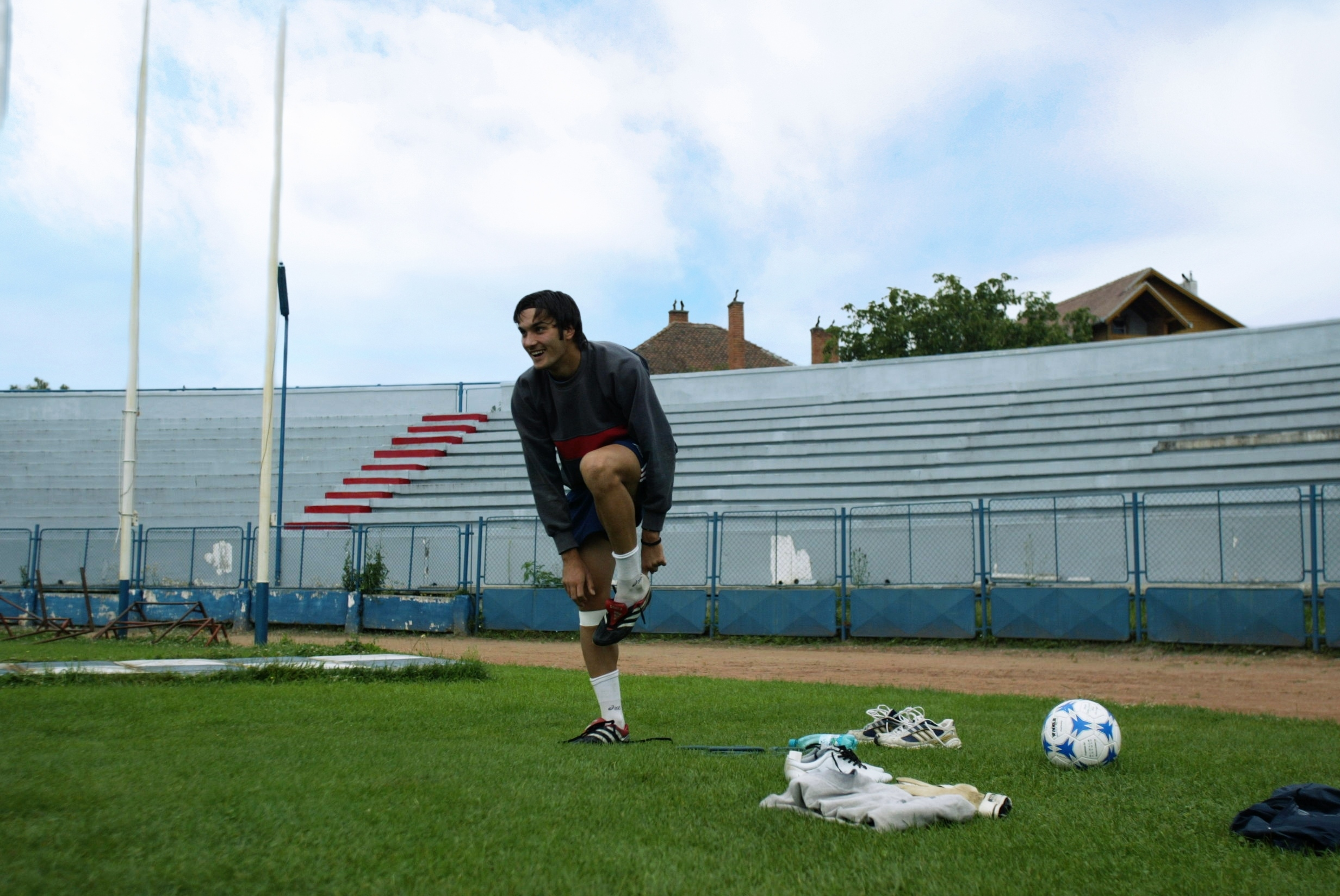
- Mihail training with Sibiu in 2005

Personal information
- Full name: Tudor Octavian Mihail
- Date of birth: 17 August 1984 (age 42)
- Place of birth: Bucharest, Romania
- Height: 1.77 m (5 ft 10 in)
- Position: Attacking midfielder

Youth career
- Dinamo Bucuresti
- Steaua Bucuresti

Senior career*
Years	Team	Apps	(Gls)
2001–2002	Rocar București	7	(0)
2002–2003	Inter Gaz București	24	(7)
2003–2004	Al-Jaish	0	(0)
2004–2005	Al-Qardaha	0	(0)
2005–2006	Sibiu	20	(2)
2006–2007	Gent	0	(0)
- * Club domestic league appearances and goals

Tudor Mihail (born 17 August 1984) is a Romanian former professional footballer who played as an attacking midfielder. He is the cousin of former Romania international player Alin Stoica.

== Career ==
Mihail was born in Bucharest, Romania. After spending his youth career playing for both Dinamo and Steaua Mihail made his senior and professional debut in the 2001–02 season for Rocar Bucuresti.

In 2003, at the age of 18, Mihail trialled with Belgian club Club Brugge.

In summer of 2005, Mihail moved to Sibiu where he spent one season.
