= Daniel Rogoveanu =

Romanian footballer

Personal information
- Full name: Daniel Dumitru Rogoveanu
- Date of birth: 30 July 1995 (age 31)
- Place of birth: Filiași, Romania
- Height: 1.73 m (5 ft 8 in)
- Position: Midfielder

Team information
- Current team: Filiași
- Number: 8

Youth career
- Olt Slatina
- –2014: Poli Timișoara

Senior career*
Years	Team	Apps	(Gls)
2014–2015	Olt Slatina	15	(0)
2016–2018	Concordia Chiajna	1	(0)
2018	→ Chindia Târgoviște (loan)	15	(0)
2018	Chindia Târgoviște	4	(0)
2019	Poli Timișoara (loan)	4	(0)
2019–2020	FC U Craiova	8	(3)
2020–2021	Slatina	25	(3)
2021	Filiași	12	(3)
2022	Focșani	25	(6)
2023–	Filiași	38	(16)
- * Club domestic league appearances and goals as of 10:56, 7 December 2024 (UTC)

Daniel Dumitru Rogoveanu (born 30 July 1995) is a Romanian professional footballer who plays as a midfielder for CSO Filiași.

== Honours ==
FC U Craiova 1948

- Liga III: 2019–20
