= 2004–05 Divizia D =

63rd season of the Liga IV, the fourth tier of the Romanian football league

Liga IV
- Season: 2004–05

The 2004–05 Divizia D was the 63rd season of Liga IV, the fourth tier of the Romanian football league system. The champions of each county association were promoted to the 2005–06 Divizia C without a promotion play-off.

== County leagues ==
- Alba (AB)
- Arad (AR)
- Argeș (AG)
- Bacău (BC)
- Bihor (BH)
- Bistrița-Năsăud (BN)
- Botoșani (BT)
- Brașov (BV)
- Brăila (BR)
- Bucharest (B)
- Buzău (BZ)
- Caraș-Severin (CS)
- Călărași (CL)
- Cluj (CJ)
- Constanța (CT)
- Covasna (CV)
- Dâmbovița (DB)
- Dolj (DJ)
- Galați (GL)
- Giurgiu (GR)
- Gorj (GJ)
- Harghita (HR)
- Hunedoara (HD)
- Ialomița (IL)
- Iași (IS)
- Ilfov (IF)
- Maramureș (MM)
- Mehedinți (MH)
- Mureș (MS)
- Neamț (NT)
- Olt (OT)
- Prahova (PH)
- Satu Mare (SM)
- Sălaj (SJ)
- Sibiu (SB)
- Suceava (SV)
- Teleorman (TR)
- Timiș (TM)
- Tulcea (TL)
- Vaslui (VS)
- Vâlcea (VL)
- Vrancea (VN)

=== Arad County ===
Pos	Team	Pld	W	D	L	GF	GA	GD	Pts	Promotion or relegation
1	Gloria CTP Arad (C, P)	34	27	5	2	108	27	+81	86	Promotion to Divizia C
2	Șoimii Lipova	34	27	4	3	96	22	+74	85	
3	Voința Macea	34	22	7	5	102	38	+64	73	
4	Voința Mailat	34	22	5	7	97	40	+57	71	
5	Național Sebiș	34	18	6	10	63	46	+17	60	
6	Dacia Beliu	34	18	2	14	71	45	+26	56	
7	Voința Zimandu Nou	34	18	2	14	84	67	+17	56	
8	Romvest Arad	34	16	8	10	79	45	+34	54 (Note: Romvest Arad deducted 2 points.)	
9	CNM Livada	34	16	3	15	70	69	+1	51	
10	Aqua Vest Arad	34	11	8	15	61	60	+1	41	
11	Crișul Chișineu-Criș	34	11	7	16	51	85	−34	40	
12	Înfrățirea Iratoșu	34	10	7	17	43	54	−11	37	
13	Inter Zimandcuz	34	10	5	19	44	81	−37	35	
14	Șoimii Pâncota	34	10	5	19	41	82	−41	35	
15	Universitatea Vinga	34	11	4	19	40	74	−34	35 (Note: Universitatea Vinga deducted 6 points.)	
16	Mureșana Mândruloc (R)	34	8	3	23	48	85	−37	27	Relegation to Arad County Championship
17	Textil Internațional Galșa (R)	34	7	2	25	42	108	−66	23	Relegation to Arad County Championship
18	Șiriana Șiria (R)	34	2	1	31	13	125	−112	7 (Note: Șiriana Șiria withdrew in the second part of the season and lost all remaining matches with 0–3.)	Relegation to Arad County Championship

Rules for classification: 1) Points; 2) Goal difference; 3) Number of goals scored.
(C) Champions; (P) Promoted; (R) Relegated

=== Bihor County ===
Pos	Team	Pld	W	D	L	GF	GA	GD	Pts	Promotion or relegation
1	Lotus Băile Felix (C, P)	30	27	2	1	110	25	+85	83	Promotion to Divizia C
2	Minerul Ștei	30	20	6	4	76	26	+50	66	
3	Locadin Țețchea	30	17	4	9	66	38	+28	55	
4	Crișul Aleșd	30	14	8	8	59	50	+9	50	
5	Regiana Cefa	30	15	3	12	68	46	+22	48	
6	Unirea Valea lui Mihai	30	14	5	11	50	46	+4	47	
7	Bihor Oradea II	30	13	7	10	57	39	+18	46	
8	Victoria Avram Iancu	30	13	4	13	75	60	+15	43	
9	Bihoreana Marghita	30	11	7	12	51	54	−3	40	
10	Romtrans Oradea	30	10	6	14	39	51	−12	36	
11	Tricolorul Damore Alparea	30	9	7	14	28	49	−21	34	
12	Oțelul Ștei	30	8	9	13	37	42	−5	33	
13	Biharea Vașcău	30	8	6	16	36	80	−44	30	
14	Frontiera Oradea	30	6	7	17	39	68	−29	25	
15	Crișana Tinca	30	7	3	20	39	69	−30	24	
16	Petrolul Suplac (R)	30	4	4	22	31	118	−87	16	Relegation to Bihor County Championship

Rules for classification: 1) Points; 2) Goal difference; 3) Number of goals scored.
(C) Champions; (P) Promoted; (R) Relegated

=== Caraș-Severin County ===
Pos	Team	Pld	W	D	L	GF	GA	GD	Pts	Promotion or relegation
1	Muncitorul Reșița (C, P)	24	18	4	2	56	16	+40	58	Promotion to Divizia C
2	Berzasca	23	14	3	6	43	23	+20	45	
3	Minerul Anina	24	13	2	9	40	34	+6	41	
4	Caromet Caransebeș	24	12	4	8	46	34	+12	40	
5	Nera Bozovici	24	12	4	8	46	32	+14	40	
6	Metalul Oțelu Roșu	23	11	6	6	40	24	+16	39	
7	Hercules Băile Herculane	24	11	3	10	33	36	−3	36	
8	Arsenal Reșița	24	7	9	8	39	38	+1	30	
9	Oravița	24	7	5	12	45	47	−2	26	
10	Metalul Bocșa	24	7	5	12	32	37	−5	26	
11	Dunărea Moldova Nouă	24	7	2	15	27	57	−30	23	
12	Gloria Reșița II	24	7	0	17	22	57	−35	21	
13	Timișul Slatina-Timiș	24	4	3	17	24	58	−34	15	

Rules for classification: 1) Points; 2) Goal difference; 3) Number of goals scored.
(C) Champions; (P) Promoted

=== Covasna County ===
Pos	Team	Pld	W	D	L	GF	GA	GD	Pts	Promotion or relegation
1	Baraolt (C, P)	30	25	2	3	114	22	+92	77	Promotion to Divizia C
2	Stăruința Bodoc	30	22	1	7	89	31	+58	67	
3	Előre Tălișoara	30	20	3	7	64	27	+37	63	
4	Prima Brăduț	30	17	5	8	98	49	+49	56	
5	Perkő Sânzieni	30	15	6	9	66	38	+28	51	
6	Ojdula	30	15	5	10	76	46	+30	50	
7	Valea Crișului	30	13	6	11	60	41	+19	45	
8	Carpați Covasna	30	13	5	12	61	50	+11	44	
9	Venus Ozun	30	12	6	12	56	65	−9	42	
10	Avântul Ilieni	30	12	2	16	43	85	−42	38	
11	Nemere Ghelința	29	9	6	14	47	56	−9	33	
12	Micfalău	30	10	3	17	64	95	−31	33	
13	Progresul Sita Buzăului	29	9	3	17	41	88	−47	30	
14	Brateș	30	8	3	19	51	93	−42	27	
15	Progresul Chichiș (R)	30	6	2	22	25	112	−87	20	Relegation to Covasna County Championship
16	Câmpul Frumos (R)	30	3	2	25	24	84	−60	11	Relegation to Covasna County Championship

Rules for classification: 1) Points; 2) Goal difference; 3) Number of goals scored.
(C) Champions; (P) Promoted; (R) Relegated

=== Dolj County ===
Pos	Team	Pld	W	D	L	GF	GA	GD	Pts	Qualification or relegation
1	Dunărea Calafat	26	19	4	3	100	26	+74	61	Qualification to championship play-off
2	Gaz Metan Pielești	26	18	4	4	82	32	+50	58	Qualification to championship play-off
3	Avântul RAT Ișalnița	26	18	4	4	64	20	+44	58	Qualification to championship play-off
4	Mârșani	26	17	4	5	73	38	+35	55	Qualification to championship play-off
5	Recolta Ostroveni	26	15	5	6	53	31	+22	50	Qualification to 5–8 place play-off
6	Portul Bechet	26	14	4	8	50	37	+13	46	Qualification to 5–8 place play-off
7	Unirea Podari (Note: Unirea Podari excluded in the second part of the season.) (R)	26	12	2	12	41	36	+5	38	Relegation to Dolj Elite Category
8	Progresul Segarcea	26	11	4	11	33	52	−19	37	Qualification to 5–8 place play-off
9	Unirea Tricolor Dăbuleni	26	10	4	12	45	53	−8	34	Qualification to 5–8 place play-off
10	Filiași	26	6	2	18	36	63	−27	20	Qualification to relegation play-out
11	Victoria Călărași (Note: Victoria Călărași withdrew before the start of the playoffs.) (R)	26	6	2	18	29	66	−37	20	Relegation to Dolj Elite Category
12	Progresul Băilești	26	5	2	19	27	83	−56	17	Qualification to relegation play-out
13	Vânătorul Desa	26	4	3	19	37	85	−48	15	Qualification to relegation play-out
14	Unirea Leamna	26	5	0	21	56	104	−48	15	Qualification to relegation play-out

Rules for classification: 1) Points; 2) Goal difference; 3) Number of goals scored.
(R) Relegated
Notes:

Championship play-off

The results between the qualified teams was maintained in the championship play-off.

Pos	Team	Pld	W	D	L	GF	GA	GD	Pts	Qualification
1	Dunărea Calafat (C, Q)	12	7	4	1	31	12	+19	25	Qualification for promotion play-off
2	Avântul RAT Ișalnița	12	6	3	3	15	15	0	21	
3	Gaz Metan Pielești	12	4	1	7	23	26	−3	13	
4	Mârșani	12	2	2	8	13	29	−16	8	

Rules for classification: 1) Points; 2) Goal difference; 3) Number of goals scored.
(C) Champions; (Q) Qualified for the phase indicated

5–8 place play-off

The results between the qualified teams was maintained in the play-off.

Pos	Team	Pld	W	D	L	GF	GA	GD	Pts
5	Recolta Ostroveni	12	8	2	2	21	10	+11	26
6	Portul Bechet	12	5	3	4	17	12	+5	18
7	Progresul Segarcea	12	5	2	5	16	17	−1	17
8	Unirea Tricolor Dăbuleni	12	1	3	8	14	29	−15	6

Rules for classification: 1) Points; 2) Goal difference; 3) Number of goals scored.

Relegation play-out

The results between the qualified teams was maintained in the relegation play-out.

Pos	Team	Pld	W	D	L	GF	GA	GD	Pts	Relegation
9	Progresul Băilești	12	6	3	3	37	22	+15	21	
10	Filiași	12	7	0	5	23	19	+4	21	
11	Unirea Leamna (R)	12	4	2	6	31	33	−2	14	Relegation to Dolj Elite Category
12	Vânătorul Desa (R)	12	3	3	6	23	38	−15	12	Relegation to Dolj Elite Category

Rules for classification: 1) Points; 2) Goal difference; 3) Number of goals scored.
(R) Relegated

=== Galați County ===
Pos	Team	Pld	W	D	L	GF	GA	GD	Pts	Promotion or relegation (Note: After 20 matches, the best four teams qualify for the championship play-off.)
1	Politehnica Galați (C, P)	22	19	1	2	93	19	+74	58	Promotion to Divizia C
2	Viitorul Costache Negri	22	14	1	7	61	33	+28	43	
3	Sporting Tecuci (Note: Sporting Tecuci and Sporting Voința Liești withdrew from the championship play-off.)	20	13	3	4	51	21	+30	42	
4	Sporting Voința Liești	20	14	1	5	52	24	+28	39 (Note: Sporting Voința Liești deducted 4 points.)	
5	Muncitorul Ghidigeni	20	10	3	7	46	51	−5	33	
6	Mălina Smârdan	20	9	2	9	37	35	+2	29	
7	Bujorii Târgu Bujor	20	7	5	8	37	37	0	26	
8	Avântul Liești	20	6	1	13	25	62	−37	19	
9	Voința Cudalbi	20	4	3	13	22	50	−28	15	
10	Viitorul Berești	20	3	1	16	17	67	−50	10	
11	Dunis Ivești	20	0	1	19	4	58	−54	1	

Rules for classification: 1) Points; 2) Goal difference; 3) Number of goals scored.
(C) Champions; (P) Promoted

=== Harghita County ===
Pos	Team	Pld	W	D	L	GF	GA	GD	Pts	Qualification or relegation
1	Știința Sărmaș (Q)	18	16	1	1	66	14	+52	49	Qualification to championship play-off
2	Palma & Vanda Borsec (Q)	18	16	1	1	52	14	+38	49	Qualification to championship play-off
3	Viitorul Gheorgheni (Q)	18	10	2	6	29	24	+5	32	Qualification to championship play-off
4	Roseal Odorheiu Secuiesc	18	7	5	6	34	25	+9	26	
5	Homorodul Merești	18	7	3	8	38	39	−1	24	
6	Promtforest Toplița	18	5	4	9	28	34	−6	19	
7	Praid	18	5	3	10	25	41	−16	18	
8	Unirea Cristuru Secuiesc	18	5	1	12	28	33	−5	16	
9	Bălan-Sândominic	18	5	3	10	17	47	−30	16 (Note: Bălan-Sândominic deducted two points.)	
10	Sapienția Miercurea Ciuc	18	2	1	15	23	69	−46	7	

Rules for classification: 1) Points; 2) Head-to-head points; 3) Head-to-head goal difference; 4) Head-to-head goals scored; 5) Head-to-head away goals scored; 6) Goal difference; 7) Goals scored.
(Q) Qualified for the phase indicated
Notes:

Championship play-off

The teams carried all records from the Regular season.

Pos	Team	Pld	W	D	L	GF	GA	GD	Pts	Promotion or relegation
1	Știința Sărmaș (C, P)	20	18	1	1	70	14	+56	55	Promotion to Divizia C
2	Palma & Vanda Borsec	20	17	1	2	54	16	+38	52	
3	Viitorul Gheorgheni	20	10	2	8	30	20	+10	32	

Rules for classification: 1) Points; 2) Goal difference; 3) Number of goals scored.
(C) Champions; (P) Promoted

=== Hunedoara County ===
Pos	Team	Pld	W	D	L	GF	GA	GD	Pts	Promotion or relegation
1	Minerul Uricani (C, P)	24	23	1	0	89	15	+74	70	Promotion to Divizia C
2	CFR Marmosim Simeria	24	17	2	5	78	18	+60	53	
3	Minerul Aninoasa	24	15	5	4	62	16	+46	50	
4	Retezatul Hațeg	24	15	1	8	42	28	+14	46	
5	Ponorul Vața	23	11	4	8	41	35	+6	37	
6	Dacia Orăștie	24	12	0	12	54	30	+24	36	
7	Minerul Bărbăteni	24	10	3	11	29	50	−21	33	
8	Constructorul Hunedoara	24	10	1	13	31	48	−17	31	
9	Minerul Teliuc	24	7	4	13	29	57	−28	25	
10	Universitatea Petroșani	23	6	5	12	29	44	−15	23	
11	Victoria Călan	24	6	3	15	28	53	−25	21	
12	Metalul Crișcior	24	3	8	13	21	62	−41	17	
13	Gloria Geoagiu	24	1	1	22	12	89	−77	4	

Rules for classification: 1) Points; 2) Goal difference; 3) Number of goals scored.
(C) Champions; (P) Promoted

=== Mureș County ===
Pos	Team	Pld	W	D	L	GF	GA	GD	Pts	Promotion or relegation
1	Trans-Sil Târgu Mureș (C, P)	28	25	2	1	101	22	+79	77	Promotion to Divizia C
2	Gliga Companies Reghin	28	18	5	5	88	30	+58	59	
3	Mureșul Rușii-Munți	27	15	0	12	89	51	+38	45	
4	Iernut	28	13	5	10	61	65	−4	44	
5	Târnava Mică Sângeorgiu de Pădure	28	11	1	16	40	69	−29	34	
6	Avântul Miheșu de Câmpie	28	10	3	15	59	71	−12	33	
7	Viitorul 2002 Târnăveni	27	6	2	19	24	82	−58	20	
8	Mureșul Chirileu	26	2	2	22	21	93	−72	8	

Rules for classification: 1) Points; 2) Goal difference; 3) Number of goals scored.
(C) Champions; (P) Promoted

=== Neamț County ===
Pos	Team	Pld	W	D	L	GF	GA	GD	Pts	Promotion or relegation
1	Flacăra Brusturi (C, P)	28	22	2	4	103	32	+71	68	Promotion to Divizia C
2	Vulturul Zănești	28	20	2	6	110	37	+73	62	
3	Victoria Horia	28	20	0	8	79	43	+36	60	
4	Bravo Bodești	28	19	1	8	89	48	+41	58	
5	Recolta Icușești	28	18	0	10	97	58	+39	54	
6	Voința Ion Creangă	28	17	2	9	85	45	+40	53	
7	Rapid Grințieș	28	16	4	8	77	44	+33	52	
8	Spicul Tămășeni	28	14	2	12	67	62	+5	44	
9	Viitorul Podoleni	28	13	0	15	83	67	+16	39	
10	Bradul Borca	28	10	1	17	43	90	−47	31	
11	Bradul Roznov	28	7	5	16	49	66	−17	26	
12	LPS Piatra Neamț	28	8	2	18	47	96	−49	26	
13	Speranța Răucești	28	7	3	18	53	91	−38	24	
14	Biruința Gherăiești	28	6	0	22	45	129	−84	18	
15	Vulturul Costișa	28	2	0	26	26	135	−109	6	
16	Inter Gârcina (D)	0	0	0	0	0	0	0	0 (Note: Inter Gârcina withdrew after 2 rounds and all its results were canceled.)	Withdrew

Rules for classification: 1) Points; 2) Goal difference; 3) Number of goals scored.
(C) Champions; (D) Disqualified; (P) Promoted

=== Suceava County ===
Pos	Team	Pld	W	D	L	GF	GA	GD	Pts	Promotion or relegation
1	Viitorul Liteni (C, P)	30	23	4	3	99	29	+70	73	Promotion to Divizia C
2	Șoimii Bucovina Bosanci	30	21	3	6	92	32	+60	66	
3	Zimbrul Siret	30	19	2	9	98	70	+28	59	
4	Arinișul Gura Humorului	30	15	6	9	64	46	+18	51	
5	Nicu Gane Fălticeni	30	15	2	13	71	53	+18	47	
6	Bucovina Rădăuți	30	12	5	13	68	53	+15	41	
7	Rapid CFR Suceava	30	11	8	11	61	50	+11	41	
8	Minerul Iacobeni	30	13	2	15	62	57	+5	41	
9	Foresta Moldovița	30	13	2	15	63	95	−32	41	
10	Juventus Fălticeni	30	13	0	17	55	57	−2	39	
11	Avântul Todirești	30	12	3	15	68	92	−24	39	
12	Avântul Grămești	30	13	2	15	57	82	−25	39 (Note: Avântul Grămești were deducted 2 points.)	
13	Victoria Păltinoasa	30	12	0	18	62	71	−9	36	
14	Rarăul Câmpulung Moldovenesc	30	11	3	16	59	85	−26	36	
15	Șomuzul Preutești (R)	30	11	0	19	46	62	−16	33	Relegation to Suceava County Championship
16	Flacăra Vicovu de Sus (R)	30	5	0	25	54	129	−75	15	Relegation to Suceava County Championship

Rules for classification: 1) Points; 2) Goal difference; 3) Number of goals scored.
(C) Champions; (P) Promoted; (R) Relegated

=== Timiș County ===
Pos	Team	Pld	W	D	L	GF	GA	GD	Pts	Promotion or relegation
1	Calor Timișoara (C, P)	30	25	4	1	97	21	+76	79	Promotion to Divizia C
2	Textila Timișoara	30	20	4	6	74	31	+43	64	
3	Timișul Albina	30	20	4	6	83	40	+43	64	
4	Furnirul Deta	30	12	9	9	59	57	+2	45	
5	Vulturii Lugoj	30	14	3	13	48	50	−2	45	
6	Tim Giroc	30	11	8	11	57	46	+11	41	
7	Nuova Mama Mia Becicherecu Mic	30	10	9	11	52	48	+4	39	
8	Bega Belinț	30	12	1	17	59	79	−20	37	
9	Tipomic Timișoara	30	10	7	13	36	53	−17	37	
10	RATT Timișoara	30	11	3	16	45	61	−16	36	
11	Unirea Peciu Nou	30	11	3	16	38	58	−20	36	
12	Auto Timișoara	30	10	5	15	48	53	−5	35	
13	Telecom Șag	30	12	8	10	48	43	+5	34 (Note: Telecom Șag were deducted 10 points.)	
14	Giarmata	30	10	4	16	38	53	−15	34	
15	ASU Politehnica Timișoara (R)	30	8	7	15	35	45	−10	31	Relegation to Timiș County Championship
16	Dacia Cărpiniș (R)	30	1	7	22	37	112	−75	10	Relegation to Timiș County Championship

Rules for classification: 1) Points; 2) Goal difference; 3) Number of goals scored.
(C) Champions; (P) Promoted; (R) Relegated

=== Tulcea County ===
Pos	Team	Pld	W	D	L	GF	GA	GD	Pts	Promotion or relegation
1	Dinamo Coral Tulcea (C, P)	30	27	2	1	155	17	+138	83	Promotion to Divizia C
2	Granitul Babadag	30	22	2	6	98	44	+54	68	
3	Razim Jurilovca	30	20	3	7	109	52	+57	63	
4	Răsăritul Sulina	30	21	0	9	75	50	+25	63	
5	Progresul Isaccea	30	16	4	10	84	59	+25	52	
6	Șoimii Topolog	30	15	2	13	84	72	+12	47	
7	Flacăra Mihail Kogălniceanu	30	12	8	10	77	65	+12	44	
8	Stăruința Baia	30	13	4	13	81	55	+26	43	
9	Arrubium Măcin	30	12	6	12	70	70	0	42	
10	Minerul Mahmudia	30	11	8	11	59	56	+3	41	
11	Old Boys Babadag	30	11	2	17	62	100	−38	35	
12	Național Somova	30	10	4	16	65	75	−10	34	
13	Dinamo Nicolae Bălcescu	30	9	3	18	70	116	−46	30	
14	Tractorul Horia	30	7	5	18	53	97	−44	26	
15	Pescărușul Sarichioi	30	5	4	21	42	105	−63	19	
16	Partizanul Luncavița	30	0	1	29	25	148	−123	1	

Rules for classification: 1) Points; 2) Goal difference; 3) Number of goals scored.
(C) Champions; (P) Promoted

== See also ==
- 2004–05 Divizia A
- 2004–05 Divizia B
- 2004–05 Divizia C
- 2004–05 Cupa României
