= Sabin Lupu =

Romanian footballer

Personal information
- Full name: Sabin Dănuț Lupu
- Date of birth: 14 March 1993 (age 33)
- Place of birth: Fratoștița, Romania
- Height: 1.79 m (5 ft 10 in)
- Position: Midfielder

Team information
- Current team: Filiași
- Number: 7

Youth career
- Pandurii Târgu Jiu

Senior career*
Years	Team	Apps	(Gls)
2012–2015	Pandurii II Târgu Jiu		
2014–2015	→ Caransebeș (loan)	23	(1)
2015	Caransebeș	15	(4)
2016	Măgura Cisnădie		
2016–2017	Gaz Metan Mediaș	13	(0)
2017–2018	Hermannstadt	20	(3)
2018–2019	FC U Craiova	12	(2)
2019	→ Filiași (loan)	8	(3)
2019	ASU Politehnica	3	(0)
2019	Viitorul Șelimbăr	2	(0)
2019–	Filiași	16	(1)
- * Club domestic league appearances and goals as of 30 April 2021

Sabin Dănuț Lupu (born 14 March 1993) is a Romanian professional footballer who played as a midfielder for CSO Filiași.

== Honours ==
Hermannstadt

- Cupa României: Runner-up 2017–18
