= 2005–06 Divizia D =

64th season of the Liga IV, the fourth tier of the Romanian football league

Liga IV
- Season: 2005–06

The 2005–06 Divizia D was the 64th season of the Liga IV, the fourth tier of the Romanian football league system. The champions of each county association play against one from a neighboring county in a play-off match played on a neutral venue. The winners of the play-off matches promoted to 2006–07 Liga III.

== County leagues ==
- Alba (AB)
- Arad (AR)
- Argeș (AG)
- Bacău (BC)
- Bihor (BH)
- Bistrița-Năsăud (BN)
- Botoșani (BT)
- Brașov (BV)
- Brăila (BR)
- Bucharest (B)
- Buzău (BZ)
- Caraș-Severin (CS)
- Călărași (CL)
- Cluj (CJ)
- Constanța (CT)
- Covasna (CV)
- Dâmbovița (DB)
- Dolj (DJ)
- Galați (GL)
- Giurgiu (GR)
- Gorj (GJ)
- Harghita (HR)
- Hunedoara (HD)
- Ialomița (IL)
- Iași (IS)
- Ilfov (IF)
- Maramureș (MM)
- Mehedinți (MH)
- Mureș (MS)
- Neamț (NT)
- Olt (OT)
- Prahova (PH)
- Satu Mare (SM)
- Sălaj (SJ)
- Sibiu (SB)
- Suceava (SV)
- Teleorman (TR)
- Timiș (TM)
- Tulcea (TL)
- Vaslui (VS)
- Vâlcea (VL)
- Vrancea (VN)

== Promotion play-off ==
The matches was scheduled to be played on 17 June 2006.

Team 1	Score	Team 2
Ecologistul Mihai Eminescu (BT)	0–2	(NT) Ceahlăul Piatra Neamț II
Juventus Fălticeni (SV)	4–3 (a.e.t.)	(BN) Progresul Năsăud
Spicul Țigănași (IS)	0–3 (Note: The FRF Discipline Commission decided that the result of the match Spicul Țigănași – Foresta Zorleni 4–2 would be approved with 0–3.)	(VS) Foresta Zorleni
Petrom Zemeș (BC)	5–2	(CV) Zagon
Șoimii Nisprod Mircești (VN)	0–3 (Note: The FRF Discipline Commission decided that the result of the match Șoimii Nisprod Mircești – Unirea Mărăcineni 0–0(3–1 p) would be approved with 0–3.)	(BZ) Unirea Mărăcineni
Sporting Tecuci (GL)	0–3	(BR) Viitorul Însurăței
Minerul Turț (SM)	2–1 (a.e.t.)	(MM) Marmaţia Sighetu Marmaţiei II
Ovidiu (CT)	2–0	(TL) Razim Jurilovca
Recolta Gheorghe Lazăr (IL)	0–2	(PH) Avântul Măneciu
Venus Independența (CL)	0–3	(B) Aversa București
Dodu Berceni (IF)	6–0	(DB) Gaz Metan Finta
Unirea Costești (AG)	3–2	(BV) Unirea Tărlungeni
Balș (OT)	1–2 (a.e.t.)	(DJ) Gaz Metan Podari
Petrolul Țicleni (GJ)	2–0	(MH) Unirea Vânători
Dacia Orăștie (HD)	5–2	(AB) FC Cugir
Timișul Albina (TM)	5–0	(CS) Metalul Bocșa
Voința Macea (AR)	0–1	(BH) Damore Tricolorul Alparea
Universitatea 1919 Cluj-Napoca (CJ)	1–0	(SJ) Zalău
Roseal Odorheiu Secuiesc (HR)	2–1 (a.e.t.)	(MS) Avântul Miheșu de Câmpie
Nova Force Giurgiu (GR)	1–2	(TR) Florea Voicilă Alexandria
Atletic Sibiu (SB)	2–1	(VL) Cozia Călimănești

== League standings ==
=== Arad County ===
Pos	Team	Pld	W	D	L	GF	GA	GD	Pts	Qualification or relegation
1	Voința Macea (C, Q)	34	28	4	2	121	13	+108	88	Qualification for promotion play-off
2	Regal Horia	34	27	4	3	79	19	+60	85	
3	Dacia Beliu	34	22	4	8	76	33	+43	70	
4	CNM Pâncota	34	21	6	7	71	27	+44	69	
5	Zimandu Nou	34	17	5	12	58	45	+13	56	
6	Voința Mailat	34	15	5	14	53	48	+5	50	
7	Vladimirescu	34	15	5	14	68	74	−6	50	
8	Crișul Chișineu-Criș	34	15	3	16	55	69	−14	48	
9	Dorobanți	34	14	5	15	51	58	−7	47	
10	Șoimii Lipova	34	13	7	14	51	49	+2	46	
11	Național Sebiș	34	12	9	13	65	57	+8	45	
12	Aqua Vest Arad	34	12	7	15	42	51	−9	43	
13	Înfrățirea Iratoșu	34	13	4	17	40	60	−20	43	
14	Unirea Șeitin	34	13	3	18	67	75	−8	42	
15	Frontiera Curtici	34	10	8	16	50	68	−18	38	
16	Inter Zimandcuz (R)	34	5	9	20	42	94	−52	24	Relegation to Liga V Arad
17	Romvest Arad (R)	34	5	6	23	39	75	−36	21	Relegation to Liga V Arad
18	Vinga (R)	34	1	2	31	17	130	−113	5	Relegation to Liga V Arad

Rules for classification: 1) Points; 2) Goal difference; 3) Number of goals scored.
(C) Champions; (Q) Qualified for the phase indicated; (R) Relegated

=== Bihor County ===
Pos	Team	Pld	W	D	L	GF	GA	GD	Pts	Qualification or relegation
1	Tricolorul Damore Alparea (C, Q)	30	24	3	3	89	29	+60	75	Qualification for promotion play-off
2	Locadin Țețchea	30	21	4	5	89	28	+61	67	
3	Bihor Oradea II	30	21	4	5	71	24	+47	67	
4	Crișul Aleșd	30	21	3	6	95	34	+61	66	
5	Minerul Ștei	30	19	6	5	76	24	+52	63	
6	Victoria Avram Iancu	30	14	5	11	57	60	−3	47	
7	Luceafărul Oradea	30	14	2	14	62	51	+11	44	
8	Romtrans Oradea	30	12	6	12	57	54	+3	42	
9	Bihoreana Marghita	30	12	4	14	53	51	+2	40	
10	Unirea Valea lui Mihai	30	9	6	15	37	52	−15	33	
11	Frontiera Oradea	30	7	8	15	41	54	−13	29	
12	Biharea Vașcău	30	9	2	19	34	74	−40	29	
13	Oțelul Ștei	30	7	6	17	33	62	−29	27	
14	Izvorul Cociuba Mare	30	6	7	17	45	75	−30	25	
15	Crișana Tinca	30	5	5	20	41	84	−43	20	
16	Petrolul Suplac	30	3	1	26	21	145	−124	10	

Rules for classification: 1) Points; 2) Goal difference; 3) Number of goals scored.
(C) Champions; (Q) Qualified for the phase indicated

=== Caraș-Severin County ===
Pos	Team	Pld	W	D	L	GF	GA	GD	Pts	Qualification or relegation
1	Metalul Bocșa (C, Q)	24	19	2	3	54	16	+38	59	Qualification for promotion play-off
2	Metalul Oțelu Roșu	24	19	1	4	80	26	+54	58	
3	Gloria Universitatea Reșița	24	14	2	8	50	29	+21	44	
4	Nera Bozovici	24	11	6	7	39	29	+10	39	
5	ASMF Caransebeș	24	11	4	9	49	40	+9	37	
6	Dunărea Moldova Nouă	24	11	4	9	42	42	0	37	
7	Arsenal Reșița	24	11	3	10	38	35	+3	36	
8	Hercules Băile Herculane	24	10	4	10	47	42	+5	34	
9	Berzasca	24	9	4	11	46	52	−6	31	
10	Voința Lupac	24	7	2	15	48	65	−17	23	
11	Oravița	24	6	3	15	35	52	−17	21	
12	Minerul Anina	24	3	6	15	42	68	−26	15	
13	CFR Caransebeș	24	3	2	19	20	80	−60	11	

Rules for classification: 1) Points; 2) Goal difference; 3) Number of goals scored.
(C) Champions; (Q) Qualified for the phase indicated

=== Covasna County ===
Pos	Team	Pld	W	D	L	GF	GA	GD	Pts	Qualification or relegation
1	Baraolt (C)	28	24	2	2	122	24	+98	74	Ineligible for promotion
2	Zagon (Q)	28	22	3	3	91	25	+66	69	Qualification to promotion play-off
3	Prima Brăduț	28	19	4	5	58	30	+28	61	
4	Stăruința Bodoc	28	19	3	6	59	34	+25	60	
5	Catalina	28	14	4	10	66	50	+16	45 (Note: Catalina, Micfalău and Progresul Sita Buzăului were deducted 1 point.)	
6	Perkő Sânzieni	28	13	2	13	52	49	+3	41	
7	Nemere Ghelința	28	12	4	12	52	52	0	40	
8	Ojdula	28	10	4	14	52	45	+7	34	
9	KSE Târgu Secuiesc II	28	9	5	14	51	61	−10	32	
10	Micfalău	28	7	8	13	64	90	−26	28	
11	Avântul Ilieni	28	8	4	16	47	75	−28	28	
12	Transkurier Sfântu Gheorghe	28	8	6	14	48	68	−20	27 (Note: Transkurier Sfântu Gheorghe and Venus Ozun were deducted 3 points.)	
13	Progresul Sita Buzăului	28	7	1	20	47	104	−57	21	
14	Venus Ozun	28	5	5	18	33	80	−47	17	
15	Brateș (R)	28	5	1	22	28	83	−55	16 (Note: Brateș withdrew after 15 rounds and lost all remaining matches with 0–3.)	Relegation to Liga V Covasna

Rules for classification: 1) Points; 2) Goal difference; 3) Number of goals scored.
(C) Champions; (Q) Qualified for the phase indicated; (R) Relegated

=== Dolj County ===
Pos	Team	Pld	W	D	L	GF	GA	GD	Pts	Qualification or relegation
1	Avântul Ișalnița	28	23	2	3	88	35	+53	71	Qualification to play-off
2	Gaz Metan Podari	28	20	6	2	76	15	+61	66	Qualification to play-off
3	CFR Petrolul Craiova	28	20	4	4	69	25	+44	64	Qualification to play-off
4	Progresul Băilești	28	17	5	6	67	34	+33	56	Qualification to play-off
5	Mârșani	28	16	4	8	84	44	+40	52	Qualification to 5–7 place play-off
6	Fulgerul Mârșani	28	11	9	8	50	50	0	42	Qualification to 5–7 place play-off
7	Dunărea Bechet	28	12	4	12	49	45	+4	40	Qualification to 5–7 place play-off
8	Recolta Ostroveni	28	10	6	12	49	38	+11	36	Qualification to 8–10 place play-off
9	Unirea Tricolor Dăbuleni	28	9	8	11	43	49	−6	35	Qualification to 8–10 place play-off
10	Standard Șimnic	28	11	2	15	48	36	+12	35	Qualification to 8–10 place play-off
11	Viitorul Brădești	28	9	4	15	37	61	−24	31	Qualification to relegation play-out
12	Progresul Segarcea	28	7	6	15	38	55	−17	27	Qualification to relegation play-out
13	Vânătorul Desa	28	3	6	19	39	111	−72	15	Qualification to relegation play-out
14	Filiași (Note: Filiași excluded in the second part of the season and lost all remaining matches with 0–3.) (R)	28	3	4	21	22	72	−50	13	Relegation to Dolj County Championship
15	Unirea Leamna (R)	28	2	4	22	35	104	−69	10	Relegation to Dolj County Championship
16	Fortuna Craiova (Note: Fortuna Craiova withdrew in the first part of the season and all its results were canceled.) (D)	0	0	0	0	0	0	0	0	Withdrew

Rules for classification: 1) Points; 2) Goal difference; 3) Number of goals scored.
(D) Disqualified; (R) Relegated
Notes:

Championship play-off

The results between the qualified teams was maintained in the championship play-off.

Table

Pos	Team	Pld	W	D	L	GF	GA	GD	Pts	Qualification
1	Gaz Metan Podari (C, Q)	6	4	1	1	10	6	+4	21	Qualification for promotion play-off
2	CFR Petrolul Craiova	6	3	1	2	11	4	+7	19	
3	Avântul Ișalnița	6	3	1	2	10	11	−1	17	
4	Progresul Băilești	6	0	1	5	2	12	−10	11	

Rules for classification: 1) Points; 2) Goal difference; 3) Number of goals scored.
(C) Champions; (Q) Qualified for the phase indicated

Results

Home \ Away	POD	CFR	AVI	PBĂ
Gaz Metan Podari		2–1	1–3	1–0
CFR Petrolul Craiova	0–0		4–0	4–0
Avântul Ișalnița	1–4	2–1		3–0
Progresul Băilești	1–2	0–1	1–1	

Legend: Blue = home team win; Yellow = draw; Red = away team win.

5–7 place play-off
Table

Pos	Team	Pld	W	D	L	GF	GA	GD	Pts
5	Dunărea Bechet	4	2	0	2	14	12	+2	6
6	Mârșani	4	2	0	2	7	7	0	6
7	Fulgerul Mârșani	4	2	0	2	9	11	−2	6

Rules for classification: 1) Points; 2) Goal difference; 3) Number of goals scored.

Results

Home \ Away	MÂR	FMÂ	DBE
Mârșani		1–0	5–1
Fulgerul Mârșani	2–1		5–1
Dunărea Bechet	4–0	8–2	

Legend: Blue = home team win; Yellow = draw; Red = away team win.

8–10 place play-off
Table

Pos	Team	Pld	W	D	L	GF	GA	GD	Pts
8	Recolta Ostroveni	4	2	1	1	10	6	+4	7
9	Unirea Tricolor Dăbuleni	4	2	1	1	6	5	+1	7
10	Standard Șimnic	4	1	0	3	6	11	−5	3

Rules for classification: 1) Points; 2) Goal difference; 3) Number of goals scored.

Results

Home \ Away	OST	UTD	STA
Recolta Ostroveni		2–2	3–1
Unirea Tricolor Dăbuleni	1–0		3–1
Standard Șimnic	2–5	2–0	

Legend: Blue = home team win; Yellow = draw; Red = away team win.

Relegation play-out
Table

Pos	Team	Pld	W	D	L	GF	GA	GD	Pts	Relegation
11	Progresul Segarcea	4	3	0	1	15	7	+8	9	
12	Viitorul Brădești	4	3	0	1	11	6	+5	9	
13	Vânătorul Desa (R)	4	0	0	4	4	17	−13	0	Relegation to Dolj County Championship

Rules for classification: 1) Points; 2) Goal difference; 3) Number of goals scored.
(R) Relegated

Results

Home \ Away	PSE	VBR	VDE
Progresul Segarcea		3–0	5–0
Viitorul Brădești	5–1		3–0
Vânătorul Desa	2–6	2–3	

Legend: Blue = home team win; Yellow = draw; Red = away team win.

=== Galați County ===
Pos	Team	Pld	W	D	L	GF	GA	GD	Pts	Qualification or relegation
1	Sporting Tecuci (C, Q)	22	19	1	2	80	13	+67	58	Qualification to promotion play-off
2	Sporting Voința Liești	22	17	2	3	80	20	+60	53	
3	Bujorii Târgu Bujor	22	16	1	5	94	28	+66	49	
4	Mălina Smârdan	22	13	3	6	56	41	+15	42	
5	Atletico Brăhășești	22	13	2	7	61	42	+19	41	
6	Muncitorul Ghidigeni	22	11	3	8	72	37	+35	36	
7	Avântul Valea Mărului	22	10	1	11	44	59	−15	31	
8	Unirea Bolonia Tulucești	22	7	1	14	43	77	−34	22	
9	Siretul Piscu	22	7	1	14	35	78	−43	22	
10	Avântul Vânatori	22	6	2	14	43	89	−46	20	
11	Olimpia Drăgușeni	22	4	0	18	37	97	−60	12	
12	Viitorul Costache Negri	22	0	1	21	3	67	−64	1	

Rules for classification: 1) Points; 2) Goal difference; 3) Number of goals scored.
(C) Champions; (Q) Qualified for the phase indicated

=== Gorj County ===
Pos	Team	Pld	W	D	L	GF	GA	GD	Pts	Qualification or relegation
1	Petrolul Țicleni (C, Q)	30	25	2	3	144	13	+131	77	Qualification to promotion play-off after tie-breaker
2	Parângul Sadu	30	24	5	1	113	22	+91	77	Qualification to tie-breaker
3	Dinamo Stănești	30	21	4	5	98	52	+46	67	
4	Vulturii Fărcășești	30	21	2	7	85	47	+38	65	
5	Dumbrava Câlnic	30	17	2	11	74	50	+24	53	
6	Universitatea Târgu Jiu	30	14	5	11	74	50	+24	47	
7	Drăguțești	30	14	4	12	87	64	+23	46	
8	Energetica Tismana	30	13	5	12	75	74	+1	44	
9	Viitorul Negomir	30	11	8	11	58	57	+1	41	
10	Rostramo Târgu Jiu (Note: Rostramo Târgu Jiu and Viitorul Cătunele withdrew in the second part of the season and lost all remaining matches with 0–3.) (R)	30	10	6	14	65	58	+7	36	Relegation to Gorj County Championship
11	Știința Peștișani	30	10	4	16	52	99	−47	34	
12	Știința Turburea	30	9	3	18	51	101	−50	30	
13	Stejari	30	9	3	18	57	78	−21	30	
14	Unirea Dragotești	30	8	4	18	49	105	−56	28	
15	Recolta Bălești	30	3	1	26	41	151	−110	10	
16	Viitorul Cătunele (R)	30	1	2	27	26	124	−98	5	Relegation to Gorj County Championship

Rules for classification: 1) Points; 2) Goal difference; 3) Number of goals scored.
(C) Champions; (Q) Qualified for the phase indicated; (R) Relegated
Notes:

Championship tie-breaker

Petrolul Țicleni and Parângul Sadu played a play-off match in order to determine the winner of Divizia D Gorj. The match tie-breaker was played on 9 June 2006 at Municipal Stadium in Târgu Jiu.

Team 1	Score	Team 2
Petrolul Țicleni	2–1	Parângul Sadu

=== Harghita County ===
Pos	Team	Pld	W	D	L	GF	GA	GD	Pts	Qualification or relegation
1	Promtforest Toplița (Note: Promtforest Toplița withdrew from the championship for financial reasons and lost all the matches it had to play (play-off) with 0–3.) (Q)	20	14	3	3	58	20	+38	45	Qualification to play-off
2	Roseal Odorheiu Secuiesc (Q)	20	13	3	4	45	26	+19	42	Qualification to play-off
3	Minerul Bălan	20	11	1	8	47	39	+8	34	
4	Sapienția Miercurea Ciuc	20	9	4	7	45	26	+19	31	
5	Real Tulgheș	20	9	4	7	40	41	−1	31	
6	Viitorul Gheorgheni	20	9	2	9	32	29	+3	29	
7	Unirea Cristuru Secuiesc	19	7	6	6	35	36	−1	27	
8	Budvar Odorheiu Secuiesc	20	7	3	10	42	54	−12	24	
9	Metalul Vlăhița	20	6	4	10	30	36	−6	22	
10	Praid	19	6	4	9	25	42	−17	22	
11	Homorodul Merești	20	0	2	18	19	72	−53	2	

Rules for classification: 1) Points; 2) Goal difference; 3) Number of goals scored.
(Q) Qualified for the phase indicated
Notes:

Championship play-off

The teams carried all records from the regular season.

Pos	Team	Pld	W	D	L	GF	GA	GD	Pts	Qualification or relegation
1	Roseal Odorheiu Secuiesc (C, Q)	22	15	3	4	51	26	+25	48	Qualification to promotion play-off
2	Promtforest Toplița	22	14	3	5	58	26	+32	45	

Rules for classification: 1) Points; 2) Goal difference; 3) Number of goals scored.
(C) Champions; (Q) Qualified for the phase indicated

=== Mureș County ===
Pos	Team	Pld	W	D	L	GF	GA	GD	Pts	Qualification or relegation
1	Avântul Miheșu de Câmpie	18	16	1	1	71	14	+57	49	Qualification to play-off
2	Miercurea Nirajului	18	12	3	3	43	21	+22	39	Qualification to play-off
3	Iernut	18	12	1	5	61	28	+33	37	Qualification to play-off
4	Mureșul Rușii-Munți	18	11	0	7	66	36	+30	33	Qualification to play-off
5	Victoria Sărățeni	18	10	2	6	42	37	+5	32	Qualification to play-out
6	Târnava Mică Sângeorgiu de Pădure	17	5	4	8	28	35	−7	19	Qualification to play-out
7	Gaz Metan Daneș	18	5	3	10	29	41	−12	18	Qualification to play-out
8	Stejarul Gurghiu	18	4	1	13	38	73	−35	13	Qualification to play-out
9	Mureșul Chirileu	18	3	4	11	31	69	−38	13	Qualification to play-out
10	Escargo Fântânele	17	1	1	15	19	74	−55	4	Qualification to play-out

Rules for classification: 1) Points; 2) Goal difference; 3) Number of goals scored.

Championship play-off

Pos	Team	Pld	W	D	L	GF	GA	GD	Pts	Qualification
1	Avântul Miheșu de Câmpie (C, Q)	12	10	1	1	37	10	+27	31	Qualification to promotion play-off
2	Iernut	12	6	1	5	25	19	+6	19	
3	Miercurea Nirajului	12	5	1	6	12	21	−9	16	
4	Mureșul Rușii-Munți	12	1	1	10	11	35	−24	4	

Rules for classification: 1) Points; 2) Goal difference; 3) Number of goals scored.
(C) Champions; (Q) Qualified for the phase indicated

Championship play-out

Pos	Team	Pld	W	D	L	GF	GA	GD	Pts
5	Victoria Sărățeni	20	15	1	4	58	26	+32	46
6	Gaz Metan Daneș	20	12	3	5	63	30	+33	36 (Note: Gaz Metan Daneș deducted 3 points.)
7	Stejarul Gurghiu	20	10	1	9	57	52	+5	31
8	Mureșul Chirileu	20	8	3	9	43	53	−10	27
9	Târnava Mică Sângeorgiu de Pădure	20	6	1	13	27	41	−14	13 (Note: Târnava Mică Sângeorgiu de Pădure and Escargo Fântânele were deducted 6 points.)
10	Escargo Fântânele	20	1	1	18	10	70	−60	−2

Rules for classification: 1) Points; 2) Goal difference; 3) Number of goals scored.

=== Neamț County ===
Pos	Team	Pld	W	D	L	GF	GA	GD	Pts	Qualification or relegation
1	Ceahlăul Piatra Neamț II (C, Q)	34	27	3	4	155	40	+115	84	Qualification to promotion play-off
2	Rapid Grințieș	34	26	2	6	113	29	+84	80	
3	Ozana Tămășeni	34	23	2	9	99	51	+48	71	
4	Victoria Horia	34	21	6	7	114	40	+74	69	
5	Voința Ion Creangă	34	21	6	7	117	48	+69	69	
6	Săvinești	34	20	3	11	99	73	+26	63	
7	Bradul Roznov	34	20	2	12	82	71	+11	62	
8	Speranța Răucești	34	13	10	11	87	87	0	49	
9	Vulturul Zănești	34	15	3	16	73	77	−4	48	
10	Victoria Roman	34	14	5	15	94	77	+17	47	
11	Viitorul Podoleni	34	14	2	18	79	91	−12	44	
12	Voința Pângărați	34	11	5	18	64	109	−45	38	
13	Bradul Borca	34	11	5	18	58	129	−71	38	
14	Recolta Icușești (Note: Recolta Icușești withdrew at the end of the first part of the season and lost all the remaining matches with 0–3.)	34	9	1	24	70	85	−15	28	
15	Flacăra Brusturi II	34	7	6	21	48	97	−49	27	
16	Duicești (Note: Duicești was excluded from championship and lost all the remaining matches with 0–3.)	34	7	3	24	45	102	−57	24	
17	LPS Roman	34	7	2	25	58	157	−99	23	
18	LPS Piatra Neamț	34	5	4	25	48	140	−92	19	

Rules for classification: 1) Points; 2) Goal difference; 3) Number of goals scored.
(C) Champions; (Q) Qualified for the phase indicated

=== Suceava County ===
Pos	Team	Pld	W	D	L	GF	GA	GD	Pts	Qualification or relegation
1	Juventus Fălticeni (C, Q)	30	25	4	1	105	25	+80	79	Qualification to promotion play-off
2	Rarăul Câmpulung Moldovenesc	30	22	4	4	97	17	+80	70	
3	Rapid CFR Suceava	30	19	4	7	85	25	+60	61	
4	Avântul Grămești	30	18	2	10	66	48	+18	56	
5	Bucovina Rădăuți	30	14	5	11	46	29	+17	47	
6	Gura Humorului	30	14	5	11	56	49	+7	47	
7	Foresta Moldovița	30	15	2	13	69	65	+4	47	
8	Zimbrul Siret	30	14	4	12	89	73	+16	46	
9	Vivipet Bădeuți	30	13	3	14	48	49	−1	42	
10	Nicu Gane Fălticeni	30	11	8	11	44	43	+1	41	
11	Minerul Iacobeni	30	11	3	16	58	75	−17	36	
12	Avântul Todirești	30	9	5	16	52	77	−25	32	
13	Flacăra Roșie Udești	30	9	1	20	58	105	−47	28	
14	Victoria Divip Păltinoasa (Note: Victoria Divip Păltinoasa withdrew after 25 rounds and lost all the remaining matches with 0–3.) (R)	30	8	0	22	28	93	−65	24	Relegation to Liga V Suceava
15	Șomuzul Preutești (R)	30	7	1	22	37	84	−47	22	Relegation to Liga V Suceava
16	Bucovina Fundu Moldovei (R)	30	4	3	23	21	82	−61	14 (Note: Bucovina Fundu Moldovei deducted 1 point.)	Relegation to Liga V Suceava

Rules for classification: 1) Points; 2) Goal difference; 3) Number of goals scored.
(C) Champions; (Q) Qualified for the phase indicated; (R) Relegated

=== Timiș County ===
Pos	Team	Pld	W	D	L	GF	GA	GD	Pts	Qualification or relegation
1	Timișul Albina (C, Q)	28	22	4	2	92	21	+71	70	Qualification to promotion play-off
2	Timișul Șag	28	19	7	2	89	27	+62	64	
3	Nuova Mama Mia Becicherecu Mic	28	18	4	6	72	37	+35	58	
4	Textila Timișoara	28	17	6	5	76	27	+49	57	
5	Giroc	28	17	4	7	74	40	+34	55	
6	Auto Timișoara	28	13	10	5	50	34	+16	49	
7	Millenium Giarmata	28	14	1	13	58	56	+2	43	
8	Tim Star’s Chișoda	28	13	4	11	53	73	−20	43	
9	Deta	28	10	5	13	64	46	+18	35	
10	Plavii Delia Sânpetru Mare	28	8	8	12	56	66	−10	32	
11	UM Timișoara II	28	9	5	14	43	61	−18	32	
12	Vulturii Lugoj	28	7	6	15	43	55	−12	27	
13	Tipomic Timișoara	28	5	3	20	41	89	−48	18	
14	Bega Belinț	28	3	1	24	34	88	−54	10	
15	Buziaș (R)	28	0	2	26	24	149	−125	2	Relegation to Timiș County Championship
16	RATT Timișoara (D)	0	0	0	0	0	0	0	0	Withdrew

Rules for classification: 1) Points; 2) Goal difference; 3) Number of goals scored.
(C) Champions; (D) Disqualified; (Q) Qualified for the phase indicated; (R) Relegated

=== Vâlcea County ===
Pos	Team	Pld	W	D	L	GF	GA	GD	Pts	Qualification or relegation
1	Cozia Călimănești (C, Q)	32	26	3	3	84	21	+63	81	Qualification to promotion play-off
2	Flacăra Horezu	32	24	3	5	118	39	+79	75	
3	Minerul Berbești	32	23	4	5	118	39	+79	73	
4	Șirineasa	32	21	5	6	65	40	+25	68	
5	Alma Lex Drăgășani	32	17	7	8	105	50	+55	58	
6	Electra Râmnicu Vâlcea	32	15	4	13	56	50	+6	49	
7	Luceafărul Pesceana	32	14	4	14	67	51	+16	46	
8	Petrolul II Drăgășani	32	14	4	14	74	56	+18	46	
9	Luncavățul Popești	32	13	4	15	52	76	−24	43	
10	Vartex Râmnicu Vâlcea	32	13	2	17	65	69	−4	41	
11	Minerul Costești	32	11	4	17	45	90	−45	37	
12	Forestierul Băbeni	32	9	8	15	49	68	−19	35	
13	Govora	32	10	5	17	57	88	−31	35	
14	Petrodam Măciuca (R)	32	10	5	17	62	85	−23	35	Relegation to Liga V Vâlcea
15	Unirea Tricolor Golești (R)	32	6	2	24	53	118	−65	20	Relegation to Liga V Vâlcea
16	Oltețul Bălcești (R)	32	5	4	23	28	90	−62	19	Relegation to Liga V Vâlcea
17	Tineretul Diculești (Note: Tineretul Diculești withdrew in the second part of the season.) (R)	0	0	0	0	0	0	0	0	Withdrew
18	Inter Sutești (Note: Inter Sutești withdrew in the first part of the season and all its results were canceled.) (R)	0	0	0	0	0	0	0	0	Withdrew

Rules for classification: 1) Points; 2) Goal difference; 3) Number of goals scored.
(C) Champions; (Q) Qualified for the phase indicated; (R) Relegated

=== Vrancea County ===
Championship final

Team 1	Score	Team 2
Voința Odobești	1–3	Șoimii Nisprod Mircești

Șoimii Nisprod Mircești won the 2005–06 Divizia D Vrancea County and qualify to promotion play-off in Liga III.

== See also ==
- 2005–06 Divizia A
- 2005–06 Divizia B
