= Doru Buican =

Romanian footballer

Personal information
- Full name: Doru Claudiu Buican
- Date of birth: 17 June 1982 (age 44)
- Place of birth: Sibiu, Romania
- Height: 1.82 m (6 ft 0 in)
- Positions: Center back; left back

Team information
- Current team: CSU Voinţa Sibiu
- Number: 13

Senior career*
Years	Team	Apps	(Gls)
2003–2006	FC Sibiu	53	(0)
2006–2008	UTA Arad	34	(1)
2009–2010	Gaz Metan Mediaş	6	(0)
2009–2010	→ UTA Arad (loan)		
2010–	CSU Voinţa Sibiu	12	(0)
- * Club domestic league appearances and goals

Doru Claudiu Buican (born 17 June 1982 in Romania) is a Romanian football defender who plays for the Romanian Liga I team CSU Voinţa Sibiu.

== Career ==
In July 2006, he was transferred to UTA Arad, in the Romanian first division. However, he never appeared in the Arad line-up until the next season, when UTA was relegated. He played for the Arad outfit for the first half of the season 2008–09 in Liga II, but in February 2009 he became free agent because UTA did not paid his wages and subsequently signed with the Liga I club Gaz Metan Mediaş. In August 2009, he was loaned back to his old club UTA Arad for the 2009–2010 season.
