= Bianca Curmenț =

Romanian handball player (born 1997)

Personal information
- Full name: Bianca Tomina Curmenț
- Nationality: Romanian
- Born: 12 June 1997 (age 29) Filiași, Romania
- Height: 1.82 m (6 ft 0 in)

Sport
- Sport: Handball
- Position: Goalkeeper
- Current club: Corona Brașov
- Number: 12

Senior clubs
- Years: Team
- 2015–2016: HC Alba Sebeș
- 2016–2017: Măgura Cisnădie
- 2017–2018: SCM Timișoara
- 2018–2024: SCM Craiova
- 2024-: Corona Brașov
National team
| Years | Team | Apps | (Gls) |
| – | Romania | 13 | (0) |
- Updated on 7 November 2025

Bianca Tomina Curmenț (born 12 June 1997) is a Romanian female handball player who plays for Corona Brașov and the Romanian national team.

== International honours ==
- Junior World Championship:
  - Bronze Medalist: 2016
