= Stadionul Orășenesc (Ovidiu) =

Multi-purpose stadium in Romania

Coordinates: 44.2642°N 28.5564°E

Stadionul Orăşenesc
- Interactive map of Stadionul Orăşenesc
- Location: Ovidiu, Romania
- Owner: Ovidiu Municipality
- Operator: CSO Ovidiu
- Capacity: 400 seated
- Surface: Grass

Tenants
- CSO Ovidiu (2004–present); Viitorul Constanța (2009–2012); Viitorul II Constanța (2014–2017)

Orăşenesc Stadium is a multi-purpose stadium in Ovidiu, Romania. It has approximately 400 seats. It is currently used mostly for football training and matches, and is the home ground of CSO Ovidiu.

The stadium is well known as the location where Gheorghe Hagi started FC Viitorul Constanța in 2009.

Restoration work on the playing surface was completed in the spring of 2022.
