= Gheorghe Ciurea =

Romanian footballer

Personal information
- Date of birth: 12 October 1962 (age 64)
- Place of birth: Căpreni, Romania
- Positions: Left midfielder; left-back

Youth career
- 1975–1982: Muncitorul Reșița
- 1982–1983: Gloria Reșița

Senior career*
| Years | Team | Apps | (Gls) |
| 1985–1986 | CSM Reșița | | |
| 1986–1987 | Electroputere Craiova | 34 | (12) |
| 1987–1992 | Universitatea Craiova | 151 | (57) |
| 1993–1996 | Farul Constanța | 102 | (13) |
| 1997–1998 | Electroputere Craiova | 37 | (6) |
| 2000 | HB Tórshavn | 7 | (1) |
| Total | | 331 | (89) |

Managerial career
- 2003: Universitatea Craiova (caretaker)
- 2006: Alro Slatina
- 2007: CSO Ovidiu
- 2009: FC Caracal
- 2011–2015: CSO Filiași
- 2015–2016: CS Podari
- 2019: CSO Filiași
- * Club domestic league appearances and goals

Gheorghe Ciurea (born 12 October 1962) is a Romanian former professional footballer who played as a midfielder. He also worked as a manager for teams in the Romanian lower leagues with a short spell in the first league at Universitatea Craiova.

== Playing career ==
Ciurea was born on 12 October 1962 in Căpreni, Romania and began playing junior-level football in 1975 under coach Stelică Carabaș at local club Muncitorul Reșița. Subsequently, he joined Gloria Reșița in 1982 and started his senior career in 1985 at Divizia B club CSM Reșița. For the 1986–87 season, he went to play for Electroputere Craiova. Afterwards, Ciurea moved to neighboring club Universitatea, making his Divizia A debut under coach Constantin Oțet in a 3–1 victory against Sportul Studențesc București in which he scored once. He played in both legs in the first round of the 1987–88 UEFA Cup and scored one goal, as his side was eliminated by Chaves. Ciurea helped the club win The Double in the 1990–91 season under the guidance of coach Sorin Cârțu, contributing with 13 goals scored in 31 league appearances, being the team's top-scorer, alongside Emil Săndoi. He also played the entire match in the 2–1 win over FC Bacău in the Cupa României final. In the same season, he played four matches in the UEFA Cup, scoring one goal to help his side get past Partizani Tirana, but they were defeated in the second round by Borussia Dortmund. Afterwards, he played in a 3–0 loss to Apollon Limassol in the 1991–92 European Cup. In the middle of that season, Ciurea left "U" Craiova to join Farul Constanța. He made three appearances in the 1995 Intertoto Cup, scoring a goal in a 2–0 win over Dnepr Mogilev. Ciurea played for Farul until 1996, totaling 253 matches with 58 goals in Divizia A. Subsequently, he returned to Electroputere in Divizia B. He ended his career in 2000, after playing under coach Ion Geolgău for HB Tórshavn in the Faroe Islands League.

== Managerial career ==
Ciurea was a caretaker coach for Universitatea Craiova in one Divizia A match, a 1–1 draw against Petrolul Ploiești. Subsequently, he continued his coaching career in the Romanian lower leagues, working for teams such as Alro Slatina, CSO Ovidiu, FC Caracal, CSO Filiași and CS Podari.

== Honours ==
Universitatea Craiova

- Divizia A: 1990–91
- Cupa României: 1990–91
