= Radu Neguț =

Romanian footballer

Personal information
- Full name: Radu Mircea Neguț
- Date of birth: 3 July 1981 (age 45)
- Place of birth: Sebeș, Romania
- Height: 1.83 m (6 ft 0 in)
- Position: Forward

Youth career
- –1997: Inter Sibiu

Senior career*
Years	Team	Apps	(Gls)
1997–2000	Inter Sibiu	66	(17)
2001–2002	Argeș Pitești	7	(0)
2001–2002	→ Industria Sârmei Câmpia Turzii (loan)	18	(7)
2003–2004	Gaz Metan Mediaș	37	(11)
2004–2005	Pandurii Târgu Jiu	22	(7)
2005–2006	FC Sibiu	18	(6)
2006–2007	Al Ettifaq	27	(11)
2008	Forex Brașov	14	(5)
2008–2009	Enosis Neon THOI Lakatamia	24	(12)
2009–2013	Voința Sibiu	65	(24)
2013–2014	Măgura Cisnădie		
Total		298	(100)

Managerial career
- 2016–2018: Hermannstadt (sporting director)
- 2021–2026: Hermannstadt (sporting director)
- * Club domestic league appearances and goals

Radu Mircea Neguț (born 3 July 1981) is a former Romanian former football player who played as a forward.

== Honours ==
Pandurii Târgu Jiu

- Divizia B: 2004–05

Al Ettifaq

- GCC Champions League: 2006

Voința Sibiu

- Liga III: 2009–10

Măgura Cisnădie

- Liga IV – Sibiu County: 2013–14
