= Victor Naicu =

Romanian footballer and manager

Personal information
- Date of birth: 29 October 1973 (age 53)
- Place of birth: Craiova, Romania
- Height: 1.88 m (6 ft 2 in)
- Position: Defender

Youth career
- –1992: Universitatea Craiova

Senior career*
Years	Team	Apps	(Gls)
1992–1993	Jiul IELIF Craiova		
1993–1995	Electroputere Craiova	34	(0)
1995–1998	Universitatea Craiova	67	(0)
1998	Rocar București	12	(0)
1999	Farul Constanța	31	(1)
2000	Rocar București	15	(0)
2000–2001	Universitatea Craiova	26	(0)
2002–2003	Yunnan Hongta	27	(2)
2003–2004	Chongqing Lifan	25	(1)
2005	Minerul Motru	18	(1)
2006	Pandurii Târgu Jiu	7	(1)
2006–2007	Minerul Motru		
Total		262	(6)

Managerial career
- 2011–2012: Metropolitan Ișalnița
- 2012–2013: CS Podari
- 2013–2014: Balș
- 2014: CS Podari
- 2014–2015: Metropolitan Ișalnița
- 2016: Universitatea Craiova (assistant)
- 2016: Universitatea Craiova (caretaker)
- 2016–2017: CS Podari
- 2017: Filiași
- 2018: Voluntari (assistant)
- 2020: Viitorul Târgu Jiu
- 2021–2024: Filiași
- 2025: Oțelul Galați (assistant)
- 2025: Filiași
- * Club domestic league appearances and goals

Victor Naicu (born 29 October 1973) is a former Romanian professional footballer.

== Honours ==
=== Player ===
Universitatea Craiova

- Cupa României runner-up: 1997–98

=== Coach ===
CS Podari

- Liga IV – Dolj County: 2012–13
