= CSO Ovidiu =

Romanian football club

- Full name: Club Sportiv Orășenesc Ovidiu
- Nicknames: Ovidenii (The People from Ovidiu)
- Short name: Ovidiu
- Founded: 27 July 2004; 22 years ago
- Ground: Orășenesc
- Capacity: 1,500
- Owner: Ovidiu Town
- Chairman: Radu Dan
- Manager: Mircea Bangheorghe
- League: Liga IV
- 2025–26: Liga IV, Constanța, 13th of 16
- Website: http://clubsportiv.primariaovidiu.ro/
Home colours	Away colours

Club Sportiv Orășenesc Ovidiu, commonly known as CSO Ovidiu, or simply as Ovidiu, is a Romanian amateur football team based in Ovidiu, Constanța County, founded on 27 July 2004. The club is currently playing in the Liga IV – Constanța County.

The team represents the football section of the multi-sport club CSO Ovidiu, which also include basketball, Rugby, Weightlifting, Martial arts, Gymnastics and Kayak-Canoe sections.

== History ==
In 2005–06 season, with Sevastian Iovănescu as head coach, Ovidenii won the Divizia D – Constanța County and the promotion play-off against Razim Jurilovca, the winner of the Divizia D – Tulcea County, 2–0 on neutral ground at Fetești. The lineup was composed of following players: Nicola - Robert Dulan ('75 Claudiu Moraru), C.Oprea, Meiroșu, Voiculescu ('70 Munteanu) - Della, Cristian Ciuciuleacă, Tăbăcaru, Tănase - L. Curt ('75 Stavrositu), Arău (65 Iancu).

In Liga III, strengthened with some experienced players such as Marius Axinciuc, Norbert Niță and Constantin Borza or youngsters such as Vlad Achim, Cornel Ciobanu and M. Bejan, the team from Ovidiu has a very good start of the season being in the 2nd place after nine rounds, but Iovănescu leaves the club for the second team of Farul Constanța and the team was led until the end of the first part of the season by Axinciuc as a player-coach. From January 2007, Gheorghe Ciurea took over as manager for the rest of the campaign and led the team to finish the 2006–07 season on 11th place.

At the end of the 2008–09 Liga III season, the club finished 2nd in its series and took part in the promotion playoff to the Liga II. However, the club lost and then withdrew, being enrolled for the 2009–10 season in the Liga IV.

== Honours ==
Liga III

- Runners-up (1): 2008–09

Liga IV – Constanța County

- Winners (2): 2005–06, 2020–21

== League history ==
Season	Tier	Division	Place	Notes	Cupa României
2023–24	4	Liga IV (CT)	12th		
2022–23	4	Liga IV (CT)	8th		
2021–22	4	Liga IV (CT)	5th		
2020–21	4	Liga IV (CT)	1st (C)		
2019–20	4	Liga IV (CT)	12th		
2018–19	4	Liga IV (CT)	12th		
2017–18	4	Liga IV (CT)	5th		
2016–17	4	Liga IV (CT)	10th		
2015–16	4	Liga IV (CT)	5th		

Season	Tier	Division	Place	Notes	Cupa României
2014–15	4	Liga IV (CT)	8th		
2013–14	4	Liga IV (CT)	7th		
2012–13	4	Liga IV (CT)	8th		
2011–12	4	Liga IV (CT)	3rd		
2010–11	4	Liga IV (CT)	16th		
2009–10	4	Liga IV (CT)	3rd		
2008–09	3	Liga III (Seria II)	2nd	Self relegated	
2007–08	3	Liga III (Seria II)	5th		Fourth round
2006–07	3	Liga III (Seria II)	11th		
2005–06	4	Liga IV (CT)	1st (C)	Promoted	

== Former managers ==
- Sevastian Iovănescu
- Gheorghe Ciurea
- Cătălin Anghel
