= Florin Cioablă =

Romanian footballer

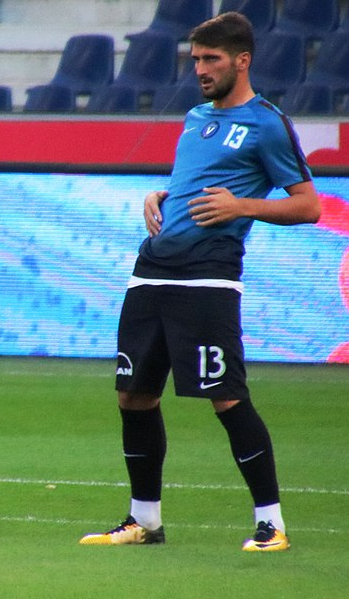
- Cioablă with Viitorul in 2017.

Personal information
- Full name: Florin Alexandru Cioablă
- Date of birth: 23 April 1996 (age 30)
- Place of birth: Craiova, Romania
- Height: 1.75 m (5 ft 9 in)
- Position: Forward

Team information
- Current team: Filiași
- Number: 25

Youth career
- –2013: Școala de Fotbal Gică Popescu
- 2013–2014: Gh. Hagi Academy

Senior career*
Years	Team	Apps	(Gls)
2014–2017	Viitorul Constanța	5	(0)
2015	→ Șoimii Pâncota (loan)	4	(0)
2015	→ Rapid București (loan)	13	(1)
2017	→ Academica Clinceni (loan)	12	(0)
2017–2018	Concordia Chiajna	1	(0)
2018–2019	Flacăra Horezu	12	(9)
2019	CSM Reșița	10	(1)
2020	Flacăra Horezu	0	(0)
2021–2022	Filiași	2	(1)
2022	Viitorul Dăești	11	(3)
2022–2023	Alexandria	21	(7)
2023–	Filiași	21	(20)
- * Club domestic league appearances and goals as of 11:00, 7 December 2024 (UTC)

Florin Alexandru Cioablă (born 23 April 1996) is a Romanian professional footballer who plays as a forward for Liga III side CSO Filiași.

== Honours ==
=== Club ===
Viitorul Constanța

- Liga I: 2016–17
