= 2004–05 Divizia B =

Divizia B
- Season: 2004–05
- Promoted: FC Vaslui; Pandurii Târgu Jiu; Jiul Petroșani
- Relegated: Tricotaje Ineu; Deva; Internațional Pitești; Ghimbav; Building Vânju Mare; Oașul Negrești; Unirea Focșani; Oltul Slatina; ACU Arad; Politehnica Timișoara; Rulmentul Alexandria; Corvinul Hunedoara
- Top goalscorer: Dumitru Gheorghe (14 goals)

The 2004–05 Divizia B was the 65th season of the second tier of the Romanian football league system.

The format has been maintained to three series, each of them consisting of 16 teams. At the end of the season, the winners of the series promoted to Divizia A and the last three places from all the series relegated to Divizia C.

== Team changes ==
=== To Divizia B ===
Promoted from Divizia C

- Botoșani
- Dunărea Galați
- Otopeni
- Ghimbav
- Oltul Slatina
- Politehnica Timișoara
- Unirea Sânnicolau Mare
- Unirea Dej
- FC Sibiu
- Dinamo II București**
- Liberty Salonta**

Relegated from Divizia A

- Ceahlăul Piatra Neamț
- Petrolul Ploiești
- FC Oradea

=== From Divizia B ===
Relegated to Divizia C

- Metalul Plopeni
- Medgidia
- Poiana Câmpina
- Rarora Râmnicu Vâlcea
- CSM Reșița
- Oltul Sfântu Gheorghe
- Cimentul Fieni
- FC Baia Mare
- FC Onești
- ARO Câmpulung
- Minaur Zlatna

Promoted to Divizia A

- Politehnica Iași
- Sportul Studențesc
- CFR Cluj

=== Note (**) ===
CSM Medgidia sold its Divizia B place to Liberty Salonta.

Metalul Plopeni sold its Divizia B place to Dinamo II București.

=== Renamed teams ===
Electrica Constanța was renamed as Altay Constanța.

Electromagnetica București was renamed as Rapid II București.

FC Craiova was moved from Craiova to Caracal and renamed as FC Caracal.

== League tables ==
=== Seria I ===
Pos	Team	Pld	W	D	L	GF	GA	GD	Pts	Qualification
1	FC Vaslui (C, P)	30	19	7	4	50	20	+30	64	Promotion to Divizia A
2	Midia Năvodari	30	15	9	6	41	26	+15	54	
3	Dunărea Galați	30	15	7	8	39	33	+6	52	
4	Dacia Unirea Brăila	30	14	8	8	43	20	+23	50	
5	Ceahlăul Piatra Neamț	30	13	7	10	34	20	+14	46	
6	Petrolul Moinești	30	13	7	10	35	26	+9	46	
7	Callatis Mangalia	30	11	13	6	34	24	+10	46	
8	Botoșani	30	13	6	11	31	22	+9	45	
9	Gloria Buzău	30	11	11	8	38	26	+12	44	
10	Precizia Săcele	30	11	9	10	28	25	+3	42	
11	Altay Constanța	30	10	9	11	37	42	−5	39	
12	FCM Târgoviște	30	8	10	12	28	42	−14	34	
13	Laminorul Roman	30	9	7	14	30	35	−5	34	
14	Ghimbav (R)	30	5	9	16	26	47	−21	24	Relegation to Divizia C
15	Unirea Focșani (Note: Unirea Focșani was excluded in the second part of the season and lost all remained matches by forfeit.) (R)	30	6	6	18	17	44	−27	24	Relegation to Divizia C
16	Politehnica Timișoara (R)	30	4	1	25	18	77	−59	13	Relegation to Divizia C

Updated to match(es) played on 30 June 2005. Source: romaniansoccer.ro (in Romanian)
Rules for classification: 1) Points; 2) Head-to-head points; 3) Head-to-head goal difference; 4) Head-to-head goals scored; 5) Head-to-head away goals scored; 6) Goal difference; 7) Goals scored.
(C) Champions; (P) Promoted; (R) Relegated

=== Seria II ===
Pos	Team	Pld	W	D	L	GF	GA	GD	Pts	Qualification
1	Pandurii Târgu Jiu (C, P)	30	19	8	3	51	17	+34	65	Promotion to Divizia A
2	FC Sibiu	30	19	7	4	49	25	+24	64	
3	Otopeni	30	18	5	7	51	27	+24	59	
4	Petrolul Ploiești	30	17	7	6	59	21	+38	58	
5	Unirea Urziceni	30	14	5	11	55	46	+9	47	
6	Rapid II București	30	11	8	11	48	49	−1	41	Ineligible for promotion
7	Dacia Mioveni	30	12	5	13	49	52	−3	41	
8	Dinamo II București	30	11	7	12	40	35	+5	40	Ineligible for promotion
9	FC Caracal	30	11	6	13	31	32	−1	39	
10	Minerul Motru	30	11	5	14	32	49	−17	38	
11	Inter Gaz București	30	9	9	12	38	42	−4	36	
12	Juventus București	30	10	5	15	28	47	−19	35	
13	Internațional Pitești (Note: Internațional Pitești sold its place to Astra Ploiești, at the end of the season.) (R)	30	9	5	16	29	50	−21	32	Relegation to Divizia C
14	Building Vânju Mare (R)	30	7	9	14	28	35	−7	30	Relegation to Divizia C
15	Oltul Slatina (R)	30	7	8	15	19	38	−19	29	Relegation to Divizia C
16	Rulmentul Alexandria (R)	30	2	7	21	14	56	−42	13	Relegation to Divizia C

Updated to match(es) played on 30 June 2005. Source: romaniansoccer.ro (in Romanian)
Rules for classification: 1) Points; 2) Head-to-head points; 3) Head-to-head goal difference; 4) Head-to-head goals scored; 5) Head-to-head away goals scored; 6) Goal difference; 7) Goals scored.
(C) Champions; (P) Promoted; (R) Relegated

=== Seria III ===
Pos	Team	Pld	W	D	L	GF	GA	GD	Pts	Qualification
1	Jiul Petroșani (C, P)	28	20	5	3	64	19	+45	65	Promotion to Divizia A
2	Gaz Metan Mediaș	28	20	5	3	48	19	+29	65	
3	FC Oradea	28	15	6	7	41	24	+17	51	
4	Olimpia Satu Mare	28	15	4	9	37	23	+14	49	
5	Liberty Salonta	28	11	9	8	37	34	+3	42	
6	Armătura Zalău	28	10	11	7	44	32	+12	41	
7	Universitatea Cluj	28	12	4	12	41	33	+8	40	
8	IS Câmpia Turzii	28	10	7	11	27	39	−12	37	
9	Tricotaje Ineu (Note: Trcotaje Ineu sold its place in the second tier to FCM Reșița, at the end of the season.) (R)	28	10	5	13	42	53	−11	35	Relegation to Divizia C
10	Unirea Sânicolau Mare	28	9	7	12	32	41	−9	34	
11	UTA Arad	28	9	6	13	31	40	−9	33	
12	Deva (Note: Deva sold its place in the second tier to Corvinul 2005 Hunedoara, at the end of the season. Deva played next season in the third tier.) (R)	28	8	6	14	30	39	−9	30	Relegation to Divizia C
13	Unirea Dej	28	8	4	16	27	42	−15	28	
14	Oașul Negrești (R)	28	7	1	20	24	56	−32	22	Relegation to Divizia C
15	ACU Arad (R)	28	1	10	17	16	47	−31	13	Relegation to Divizia C
16	Corvinul Hunedoara (Note: Corvinul Hunedoara was excluded in the first part of the season and all its results were cancelled. At the end of the season Corvinul 2005 (an unofficial successor) bought Deva's place in the second tier.) (R)	0	0	0	0	0	0	0	0	Relegation to Divizia C

Updated to match(es) played on 30 June 2005. Source: romaniansoccer.ro (in Romanian)
Rules for classification: 1) Points; 2) Head-to-head points; 3) Head-to-head goal difference; 4) Head-to-head goals scored; 5) Head-to-head away goals scored; 6) Goal difference; 7) Goals scored.
(C) Champions; (P) Promoted; (R) Relegated

== Top scorers ==
14 goals

- (Romania) Dumitru Gheorghe (Unirea Urziceni)
- (Romania) Daniel Stan (FC Oradea)

12 goals

- (Romania) Gabriel Apetri (Jiul Petroșani)
- (Romania) Claudiu Boaru (Gaz Metan Mediaș)

11 goals

- (Romania) Emil Jula (Universitatea Cluj)
- (Romania) Valentin Badea (FC Vaslui)

10 goals

- (Romania) Iulian Ștefan (Pandurii Târgu Jiu)
- (Romania) Cristian Constantin (Unirea Urziceni)

9 goals

- (Romania) Romeo Buteseacă (Dacia Unirea Brăila)

8 goals

- (Romania) Tihamer Török (FC Vaslui)

7 goals

- (Romania) Dorel Zaharia (Gaz Metan Mediaș)
- (Romania) Gigel Ene (Electromagnetica București)
- (Romania) Radu Neguț (Pandurii Târgu Jiu)
- (Romania) János Székely (Universitatea Cluj)

== See also ==
- 2004–05 Divizia A
