= FC Olt Slatina =

Defunct association football club in Romania

- Full name: Fotbal Club Olt Slatina
- Nicknames: Alb-vișinii (The White and Burgundies)
- Short name: Olt
- Founded: 2006 as Alro Slatina
- Dissolved: 2015
- Ground: 1 Mai
- Capacity: 12,000
Home colours	Away colours

Fotbal Club Olt Slatina (formerly known as Alro Slatina) was a Romanian professional football club from Slatina, Olt County, founded in 2006 and dissolved in 2015.

The club was known as CS Alro Slatina until the summer of 2012 when it was separated from the sports club and renamed FC Olt Slatina (with no connections with the old FC Olt Slatina club that played at Piatra Olt).

== History ==
In the 2004–05 season, Alprom Slatina, the team of the Aluminium Processing Plant, won the Divizia D Olt County championship and earned promotion to Divizia C.

In 2005–06, it finished 2nd in Series V of Divizia C, while the city found itself in an unusual situation, being represented at the same level by two clubs, the industrial side and Oltul Slatina, owned by the municipality and recently relegated from the second division, with both teams playing their home matches at the same time and dividing local support.

In 2006, following the merger through which the Alprom company was absorbed by Alro, the club was renamed Alro Slatina and also absorbed Oltul, which transferred its key players and municipal funding to the new entity and was relocated to Balș, but, as the process was completed late, it continued to compete under the name Oltul Slatina during the 2006–07 season. The team started the campaign under Gheorghe Ciurea, assisted by Marian Calafeteanu, and played its home matches at the Metalurgistul Stadium, but results were inconsistent, leading to several coaching changes, Ciurea being replaced after three rounds by Marin Radu, who left at mid-season, with Iordan Eftimie taking over for the remainder of the campaign, at the end of which the team finished 4th in Series IV.

The following seasons brought moderate results. In 2007–08, the team finished 6th after beginning under Iordan Eftimie, who was replaced after eight rounds by Constantin Vlad, with Ionuț Tache taking charge towards the end of the campaign. In 2008–09, the season began under Gabriel Dumitru, who was replaced after nine rounds by Dan Mănăilă, and amid financial uncertainty and reduced support from the industrial company, with financing subsequently taken over by the Olt County Council, the team finished 8th.

In the 2009–10 season, after a difficult start under Dan Mănăilă, results improved under Costel Asănică and later Dan Oprescu and, also benefiting from favorable circumstances within the series, the team finished two points ahead of Târgoviște and secured promotion to Liga II after a decisive final-round victory at Șotânga.

It finished 5th the 2010–11 and 2011–12 seasons of the Liga II, although at the start of every season the chairman stated that the objective was the promotion to the Liga I. Before the start of the 2012–13 season of the Liga II the chairman announced once again that the promotion is mandatory. This statement proved to be very far from the truth, in the end, Olt finishing 11th, just above the relegation line.

On 28 August 2015, the club was disbanded and it withdrew from Liga III.

Inter Clinceni, a team from Ilfov County (near Bucharest), was moved to Slatina and continued as Inter Olt Slatina, but it was also disbanded the next year.

== Honours ==
Liga III

- Winners (1): 2009–10

Divizia D / Liga IV – Olt County

- Winners (1): 2004–05

== Notable former players ==
The footballers enlisted below have had international cap(s) for their respective countries at junior and/or senior level and/or more than 100 caps for FC Olt Slatina.

Romania

- (Romania) Nicușor Bancu

== Former managers ==
- (Romania) Gheorghe Ciurea (2006)
- (Romania) Marin Radu (2006)
- (Romania) Iordan Eftimie (2007)
- (Romania) Constantin Vlad (2007)
- (Romania) Ionuț Tache (2007–2008)
- (Romania) Gabriel Dumitru (2008)
- (Romania) Corneliu Papură (2010–2011)
- (Romania) Daniel Mogoșanu (2011–2012)
- (Romania) Corneliu Papură (2012)
- (Romania) Sorin Cârțu (2012)
