= CSO Filiași =

Romanian football club

- Full name: Club Sportiv Orășenesc Filiași
- Nicknames: Filieșenii (The People from Filiași); Alb-albaștrii (The White-Blues)
- Short name: Filiași
- Founded: 2009; 17 years ago
- Ground: Orășenesc
- Capacity: 1,360
- Owner: Filiași Town
- Chairman: Alin Pîrvuică
- Manager: vacant
- League: Liga IV
- 2025–26: Liga III, Seria V, 10th (relegated)
| Home colours | Away colours |

Club Sportiv Orășenesc Filiași, commonly known as CSO Filiași, or simply as Filiași, is a Romanian football club based in Filiași, Dolj County, currently playing in the Liga IV, the fourth tier of Romanian football.

Founded in 2009, CSO Filiași competed at county level until 2014, when the team earned promotion to Liga III. Since then, Filieșenii have established themselves as a stable mid-table side in the third tier, achieving four 2nd-place finishes in their series and reaching the quarter-finals of the Cupa României in the 2021–22 campaign.

== History ==
Football in Filiași has been documented since the postwar period, when CFR Filiași was first mentioned in the press following a friendly match against the newly founded UNSR Craiova, which ended in a 6–3 victory. The first recorded lineup of the team included V. Gheorghe (Răcăreanu I), Stomnevici, Tobă, Olar, Bicică, Cricitoiu II, Rada, Răcăreanu II, Udrescu, Ruicu, and Merfu. Over the decades, the team competed in regional, district, and county championships under various names, including Progresul, Olimpia, Avântul, and TRAFO Filiași.

In the mid-1990s, the club competed as Energo TMC Filiași in the Dolj County Championship. The 1995–96 season ended in relegation after a last-place finish. The team soon changed its name to Mecanica Filiași and earned promotion, but the return to a higher division proved difficult. A 17th-place finish in the 1997–98 season should have led to immediate relegation, but the team was spared due to the withdrawal of other clubs. However, the following campaign ended with an 18th-place finish, and relegation followed after a 3–4 loss in the promotion/relegation play-off against SCCF Giroc.

Promotion to the fourth division was regained after winning Series II of the Dolj County second tier. In the summer of 2000, the club changed its name to Aquaterm Filiași following its takeover by the local water and heating utility and continued competing in the county’s top tier.

The 2001–02 campaign ended with a 14th-place finish and another relegation, but the team was once again spared from dropping down after being taken over by the town authorities and renamed Asociația Sportivă Orășenească Filiași. In 2002–03, the team finished 16th in Divizia D – Dolj County but secured its place in the division by winning the promotion/relegation play-off 2–1 against Amaradia Melinești.

Further difficulties emerged in the 2005–06 season, when financial problems led to the club’s withdrawal midway through the campaign, marking the end of a turbulent era in Filiași’s football history.

A fresh start came in 2006, when Florea Spânu founded the Luceafărul Filiași Football School. Meanwhile, local authorities began investing in a new sports base, and in 2009, Club Sportiv Orășenesc Filiași was officially established. Promotion to Divizia D – Dolj County followed in 2011.

In the summer of 2011, Gheorghe Ciurea was appointed as the new head coach and guided the team to a 9th-place finish in the 2011–12 season, followed by a 3rd-place finish in 2012–13. The team obtained promotion to Liga III at the end of the 2013–14 season by winning Liga IV – Dolj County and defeating Flacăra Horezu, the Vâlcea County champions, 3–2 in the promotion play-off held at the Municipal Stadium in Drobeta Turnu Severin. The winning squad led by Gheorghe Ciurea included Victor Lascu, Daniel Ianâcu, Claudiu Sodoleanu, Aurel Lupu, Costinel Mateiță, Fabian Crușoveanu, Adrian Dumitrașcu, George Hrelea, Laurențiu Paiș, Constantin Pârvuică, Alin Bălă, George Lăpădătescu, Georgian Borneci, Daniel Celea, Mihai Răducanu, Octavian Cârjan, and Mihăiță Nicuț.

The White and Blues made their debut in Liga III with a 7th-place finish in Series IV in the 2014–15 season. The following campaign proved more difficult, marked by several managerial changes. In June 2015, Gheorghe Ciurea was replaced by Viorel Cojocaru, who was succeeded by Ionel Luță in September. Luță was then replaced in March by Dragoș Bon, who guided the team to a 14th-place finish in Series IV.

In the following season, Dragoș Bon was replaced in November by Florin Șoavă, who guided the team to a 10th-place finish in Series III. The 2017–18 season began with a brief stint under Victor Naicu, who was dismissed after the eleventh round. The team was then led by assistant coach Cosmin Fruntelată until the winter break, after which Silviu Lung took over and brought the team to a 7th-place finish in Series IV. After Lung's departure in September, Mugur Gușatu was appointed as the new head coach of CSO Filiași, leading the team to a 5th-place finish in Series III of the 2018–19 campaign.

Gheorghe Ciurea returned as head coach for the 2019–20 season, but after the White and Blues ended the first half of the campaign in the relegation zone in Series IV, five points behind the first safety spot, the club decided to part ways with him. Nicolae Constantin was appointed as the new head coach in January 2020, but the season was suspended in March due to the COVID-19 pandemic, with CSO Filiași in 13th place and ultimately spared from relegation.

However, Constantin was replaced in June by Mario Găman, who led the team to a 2nd-place finish in Series VI in the 2020–21 season, qualifying for the promotion play-off, where it was eliminated in the first round by Corona Brașov, 0–5 on aggregate (0–1 in Brașov and 0–4 in Filiași). The squad included, among others, Florin Bănuță, Ovidiu Jianu, Robert Dănescu, Ionuț Tătaru, Eduard Dina, Cosmin Calu (captain), Marius Duriță, Andrei Vaștag, Cristian Poiană, Alexandru Armășelu, Cătălin Manolache, Alexandru Fotescu, Dragoș Săulescu, Dragoș Circă, Răzvan Vespe, Marius Albăstroiu, Andrei Militaru, Albert Cornicioiu, Sabin Lupu, Andrei Șendroiu, and Daniel Mărgărit.

Mario Găman led CSO Filiași during the first part of the 2021–22 season, guiding the team to a historic run in the Cupa României, reaching the quarter-finals after eliminating CS Cârcea (3–0), Vedița Colonești (2–2 a.e.t., 11–10 on penalties), Viitorul Târgu Jiu (3–2), UTA Arad (1–0), and Hermannstadt (2–2 a.e.t., 6–5 on penalties). He left the club in October and was replaced by Victor Naicu, who was in charge of the quarter-final match, a 0–3 defeat against Universitatea Craiova at the Ion Oblemenco Stadium. Naicu then led the team to a 6th-place finish in the regular season of Series VI and 5th overall after the play-out round. The squad included, among others, Fl. Șerban, C. Calu, E. Dina, I. Tătaru, R. Dănescu, D. Rogoveanu, V. Vîlcică, I. Zanfir, I. Crețu, Al. Armășelu, R. Bubuioc, D. Constantinescu, Vl. Popa, Fl. Cioablă, A. Șerban, D. Prunaru, A. Militaru, D. Boldu, B. Georgescu, A. Pencea and Al. Vulpe.

The White and Blues finished the 2022–23 campaign in 2nd place in both the regular season and the play-off round of Series VII under the guidance of Victor Naicu, qualifying for the promotion play-off. The campaign ended in the first round against CSM Reșița, after a 2–2 draw at Filiași and a heavy 0–5 defeat in Reșița.

In the 2023–24 season, still led by Naicu, CSO Filiași repeated the performance, finishing 2nd again in Series VII in both the regular season and the play-off round, but lost in the first round of the promotion play-off to FC Bihor: 1–1 at home and 0–1 after extra time in Oradea.

For the 2024–25 season, CSO Filiași was moved to Series VIII, securing 2nd place in both the regular season and the play-off round. At the start of 2025, head coach Victor Naicu left to become assistant to Ovidiu Burcă at Oțelul Galați and was replaced by Cosmin Fruntelată. However, Naicu returned to take charge in March. Qualification for the promotion play-off was achieved for the third consecutive time, but the club was disqualified for failing to meet the Romanian Football Federation’s requirements regarding youth teams.

== Grounds ==
CSO Filiași plays its home matches on Orășenesc Stadium in Filiași, with a capacity of 1,360 seats. During the construction of the new stadium, CSO played on Oltenia Stadium in Ișalnița, with a capacity of 2,000 seats.

== Honours ==
- Liga III
  - Runners-up (4): 2020–21, 2022–23, 2023–24, 2024–25
- Liga IV – Dolj County
  - Winners (1): 2013–14

== Players ==
=== First team squad ===
As of 10 September 2024

Note: Flags indicate national team as defined under FIFA eligibility rules; some limited exceptions apply. Players may hold more than one non-FIFA nationality.

| No. | Pos. | Nation | Player |
|---|---|---|---|
| 1 | GK | ROU | Robert Pena (on loan from FCU Craiova) |
| 2 | DF | ROU | Cosmin Calu (Captain) |
| 5 | DF | ROU | Octavian Ciucă (on loan from FCU Craiova) |
| 6 | FW | ROU | Federico Cîrpici (on loan from CSU Craiova) |
| 7 | MF | ROU | Viorel Vîlcică |
| 8 | MF | ROU | Daniel Rogoveanu |
| 9 | FW | ROU | Angelo Sîrbu (on loan from FCU Craiova) |
| 10 | MF | ROU | Alexandru Armășelu |
| 11 | MF | ROU | Remus Trancă |
| 14 | MF | ROU | Alexandru Mitulețu |
| 15 | MF | ROU | Denis Guță |
| 17 | DF | ROU | Cătălin Dogaru |

| No. | Pos. | Nation | Player |
|---|---|---|---|
| 19 | DF | ROU | Eduard Dina |
| 20 | DF | ROU | Ionuț Zanfir (on loan from FCU Craiova) |
| 21 | MF | ROU | Sebastian Dan (on loan from CSU Craiova) |
| 22 | MF | ROU | Gabriel Măgărea |
| 23 | DF | ROU | Eric Dăescu |
| 24 | MF | ROU | David Croitoru |
| 25 | FW | ROU | Florin Cioablă |
| 29 | MF | ROU | Robert Oprea |
| 31 | GK | ROU | Ștefan Popa |
| 35 | DF | ROU | Adrian Stăncălie (on loan from FCU Craiova) |
| 45 | DF | ROU | Robert Nebancea |
| 99 | FW | ROU | Sorin Popa |

=== Out on loan ===
Note: Flags indicate national team as defined under FIFA eligibility rules; some limited exceptions apply. Players may hold more than one non-FIFA nationality.

| No. / Pos. / Nation / Player | No. / Pos. / Nation / Player |

== Club Officials ==
=== Board of directors ===
| Role | Name |
|---|---|
| Owner | (Romania) Filiași Town |
| President | (Romania) Alin Pîrvuică |
| Delegate | (Romania) Ionică Peța |

=== Current technical staff ===
| Role | Name |
|---|---|
| Manager | vacant |
| Assistant manager | vacant |

== League history ==
| Season | Tier | Division | Place | Notes | Cupa României |
|---|---|---|---|---|---|
| 2025–26 | 3 | Liga III (Seria V) | TBD | | |
| 2024–25 | 3 | Liga III (Seria VIII) | 2nd | | Second round |
| 2023–24 | 3 | Liga III (Seria VII) | 2nd | | Second round |
| 2022–23 | 3 | Liga III (Seria VII) | 2nd | | Second round |
| 2021–22 | 3 | Liga III (Seria VI) | 5th | | Quarter-finals |
| 2020–21 | 3 | Liga III (Seria VI) | 2nd | | Fourth round |
| 2019–20 | 3 | Liga III (Seria IV) | 13th | | Third round |
| 2018–19 | 3 | Liga III (Seria III) | 5th | | Third round |

| Season | Tier | Division | Place | Notes | Cupa României |
|---|---|---|---|---|---|
| 2017–18 | 3 | Liga III (Seria IV) | 7th | | Fourth round |
| 2016–17 | 3 | Liga III (Seria III) | 10th | | |
| 2015–16 | 3 | Liga III (Seria IV) | 14th | | |
| 2014–15 | 3 | Liga III (Seria IV) | 7th | | |
| 2013–14 | 4 | Liga IV (DJ) | 1st (C, P) | Promoted | |
| 2012–13 | 4 | Liga IV (DJ) | 3rd | | |
| 2011–12 | 4 | Liga IV (DJ) | 9th | | |

== Former managers ==
- (Romania) Gheorghe Ciurea (2011–2015)
- (Romania) Viorel Cojocaru (2015)
- (Romania) Ionel Luță (2015–2016)
- (Romania) Dragoș Bon (2016)
- (Romania) Florin Șoavă (2016–2017)
- (Romania) Victor Naicu (2017)
- (Romania) Cosmin Fruntelată (2017) (interim)
- (Romania) Silviu Lung (2018)
- (Romania) Mugur Gușatu (2018–2019)
- (Romania) Gheorghe Ciurea (2019)
- (Romania) Nicolae Constantin (2020)
- (Romania) Mario Găman (2020–2021)
- (Romania) Victor Naicu (2021–2024)
- (Romania) Cosmin Fruntelată (2025) (interim)
- (Romania) Victor Naicu (2025–)
