= 2006–07 Liga III =

Liga III
- Season: 2006–07

The 2006–07 Liga III season was the 51st season of Liga III, the third tier of the Romanian football league system. It was the first in this format (six series of 18 teams each).

The winners of each division got promoted to the 2007–08 Liga II season. There were also two playoff tournaments held at neutral venues involving the second placed teams, one with those from series 1, 2 and 3, the other with those from series 4, 5, and 6. The winners of the playoffs also got promoted to the 2007–08 Liga II season. The bottom three from each division were relegated at the end of the season to the county football leagues (Liga IV). From the 15th placed teams, another three were relegated. To determine these teams, separate standings were computed, using only the games played against clubs ranked 1st through 14th.

== Standings ==
=== Seria I ===
Pos	Team	Pld	W	D	L	GF	GA	GD	Pts	Promotion or relegation
1	CSM Focșani (C, P)	34	21	7	6	52	23	+29	70	Promotion to Liga II
2	Pambac Bacău	34	19	9	6	55	25	+30	66	Qualification to promotion play-offs
3	Oțelul Galați II	34	18	7	9	63	35	+28	61	
4	Politehnica Galați	34	18	7	9	60	38	+22	61	
5	Aerostar Bacău	34	16	9	9	65	42	+23	57	
6	Râmnicu Sărat	34	17	5	12	58	34	+24	56	
7	FCM Bacău II	34	16	6	12	45	40	+5	54	
8	Willy Bacău	34	15	7	12	60	44	+16	52	
9	Ceahlăul Piatra Neamț II	34	14	8	12	46	39	+7	50	
10	Politehnica Iași II	34	14	7	13	40	34	+6	49	
11	Juventus Fălticeni	34	14	5	15	48	45	+3	47	
12	CFR Pașcani	34	13	7	14	43	40	+3	46	
13	Laminorul Roman	34	14	2	18	52	56	−4	44	
14	Transkurier Sfântu Gheorghe	34	12	5	17	37	50	−13	41	
15	NGM Leonard Pașcani	34	12	4	18	33	62	−29	40	
16	Petrolul Moinești (R)	34	10	3	21	32	52	−20	33	Relegation to Liga IV
17	KSE Târgu Secuiesc (R)	34	7	5	22	27	57	−30	26	Relegation to Liga IV
18	Roseal Odorheiu Secuiesc (R)	34	3	3	28	20	120	−100	12	Relegation to Liga IV

(C) Champions; (P) Promoted; (R) Relegated

=== Seria II ===
Pos	Team	Pld	W	D	L	GF	GA	GD	Pts	Promotion or relegation
1	Dinamo București II (C, P)	34	26	3	5	108	41	+67	81	Promotion to Liga II
2	Inter Gaz București (P, O)	34	23	3	8	63	27	+36	72	Qualification to promotion play-offs
3	Rocar București	34	22	5	7	75	31	+44	71	
4	Portul Constanța	34	18	8	8	62	37	+25	62	
5	Dodu Berceni	34	17	8	9	54	35	+19	59	
6	Unirea Slobozia	34	16	9	9	54	43	+11	57	
7	Farul Constanța II	34	16	4	14	63	56	+7	52	
8	Dunărea Călărași	34	14	9	11	48	36	+12	51	
9	Callatis Mangalia	34	15	5	14	56	47	+9	50	
10	Viitorul Însurăței	34	13	9	12	53	41	+12	48	
11	Ovidiu	34	12	12	10	33	33	0	48	
12	Steaua București II	34	12	8	14	52	53	−1	44	
13	Chitila	34	13	5	16	39	53	−14	44	
14	Aurora Mangalia	34	10	7	17	39	65	−26	37	
15	Oil Terminal Constanța (R)	34	6	10	18	28	47	−19	28	Relegation to Liga IV
16	Petrolul Brăila (R)	34	6	8	20	30	64	−34	26	Relegation to Liga IV
17	Phoenix Ulmu (R)	34	3	5	26	25	89	−64	14	Relegation to Liga IV
18	Politehnica Timișoara (R)	34	4	2	28	26	110	−84	14	Relegation to Liga IV

(C) Champions; (O) Play-off winners; (P) Promoted; (R) Relegated

=== Seria III ===
Pos	Team	Pld	W	D	L	GF	GA	GD	Pts	Promotion or relegation
1	Concordia Chiajna (C, P)	32	21	7	4	89	37	+52	70	Promotion to Liga II
2	Juventus București (Q)	32	20	5	7	56	21	+35	65	Qualification to promotion play-offs
3	Buftea	32	17	6	9	55	42	+13	57	
4	1 Decembrie	32	16	8	8	45	39	+6	56	
5	Astra Ploiești	32	15	7	10	48	40	+8	52	
6	Predeal	32	15	5	12	46	33	+13	50	
7	Conpet Ploiești	32	15	5	12	55	32	+23	50	
8	Aversa București	32	14	5	13	52	44	+8	47	
9	Ghimbav	32	14	4	14	54	59	−5	46	
10	Rapid București II	32	12	10	10	31	28	+3	46	
11	Tricolorul Breaza	32	12	9	11	39	42	−3	45	
12	Electrosid Titu	32	10	13	9	33	40	−7	43	
13	Petrolul Ploiești II	32	13	4	15	41	52	−11	43	
14	Clinceni	32	9	9	14	32	51	−19	36	
15	Petrolul Târgoviște (R)	32	4	8	20	25	51	−26	20	Relegation to Liga IV
16	Avântul Mâneciu (R)	32	5	5	22	32	70	−38	20	Relegation to Liga IV
17	Flacăra Moreni (R)	32	4	2	26	22	74	−52	14	Relegation to Liga IV
18	Unirea Mărăcineni (D)	0	0	0	0	0	0	0	0 (Note: Unirea Mărăcineni withdrew from the championship in the first part of the season and all its results were canceled.)	Withdrew

(C) Champions; (D) Disqualified; (P) Promoted; (Q) Qualified for the phase indicated; (R) Relegated

=== Seria IV ===
Pos	Team	Pld	W	D	L	GF	GA	GD	Pts	Promotion or relegation
1	Severnav Drobeta-Turnu Severin (C, P)	34	26	3	5	69	29	+40	81	Promotion to Liga II
2	Minerul Motru	34	23	5	6	75	21	+54	74	Qualification to promotion play-offs
3	Minerul Mehedinți	34	20	6	8	62	29	+33	66	
4	Alro Slatina	34	20	6	8	44	18	+26	66	
5	EMC Rovinari	34	17	4	13	48	45	+3	55	
6	Minerul Mătăsari	34	16	5	13	34	31	+3	53	
7	Armata Craiova	34	14	7	13	49	41	+8	49	
8	Dunărea Calafat	34	15	3	16	42	53	−11	48	
9	Rova Roșiori	34	12	7	15	32	43	−11	43	
10	Gaz Metan Podari	34	11	9	14	38	43	−5	42	
11	Petrom Chimia Craiova	34	11	8	15	32	43	−11	41	
12	Oltul Slatina	34	11	8	15	52	49	+3	41	
13	Progresul Corabia	34	11	7	16	43	45	−2	40	
14	Vulcan	34	11	6	17	22	39	−17	39	
15	Unirea Costești	34	11	5	18	39	59	−20	38	
16	Petrolul Țicleni (R)	34	8	6	20	32	71	−39	30	Relegation to Liga IV
17	Minerul Uricani (R)	34	8	6	20	31	67	−36	30	Relegation to Liga IV
18	Florea Voicilă Alexandria (R)	34	7	7	20	34	52	−18	28	Relegation to Liga IV

(C) Champions; (P) Promoted; (R) Relegated

=== Seria V ===
Pos	Team	Pld	W	D	L	GF	GA	GD	Pts	Promotion or relegation
1	Arieşul Turda (C, P)	34	23	8	3	90	21	+69	77	Promotion to Liga II
2	Mureșul Deva (P, O)	34	20	9	5	59	19	+40	69	Qualification to promotion play-offs
3	Inter Blaj	34	17	6	11	50	30	+20	57	
4	Soda Ocna Mureș	34	16	9	9	44	32	+12	57	
5	Lacul Ursu Mobila Sovata	34	16	5	13	60	58	+2	53	
6	Oltchim Râmnicu Vâlcea	34	15	7	12	45	36	+9	52	
7	Trans Sil Târgu Mureș	34	13	10	11	44	40	+4	49	
8	Gloria Bistrița II	34	11	15	8	35	32	+3	48	
9	Sparta Mediaș	34	12	11	11	54	39	+15	47	
10	Sănătatea Servicii Publice Cluj	34	14	5	15	48	65	−17	47	
11	Universitatea 1919 Cluj-Napoca	34	12	10	12	40	37	+3	46	
12	Maris Târgu Mureș	34	11	12	11	48	50	−2	45	
13	Avântul Reghin	34	12	8	14	37	44	−7	44	
14	Sebeș	34	13	5	16	53	50	+3	44	
15	Athletic Sibiu	34	12	7	15	38	43	−5	43	
16	Dacia Orăștie (R)	34	10	6	18	46	65	−19	36	Relegation to Liga IV
17	Sibiu (R)	34	6	8	20	32	66	−34	26	Relegation to Liga IV
18	Someș Gaz Beclean (R)	34	1	3	30	18	114	−96	6	Relegation to Liga IV

(C) Champions; (O) Play-off winners; (P) Promoted; (R) Relegated

=== Seria VI ===
Pos	Team	Pld	W	D	L	GF	GA	GD	Pts	Promotion or relegation
1	Liberty Salonta (C, P)	34	24	6	4	84	24	+60	78	Promotion to Liga II
2	Luceafărul Lotus Băile Felix	34	20	7	7	50	25	+25	67	Qualification to promotion play-offs
3	Someșul Satu Mare	34	19	6	9	70	36	+34	63	
4	Calor Timișoara	34	18	6	10	74	32	+42	60	
5	Unirea Sânnicolau Mare	34	17	8	9	54	41	+13	59	
6	Timișul Albina	34	17	6	11	53	41	+12	57	
7	Voința Macea	34	15	8	11	61	42	+19	53	
8	Tim Giroc Timișoara	34	15	7	12	52	43	+9	52	
9	UM Timișoara	34	14	7	13	57	38	+19	49	
10	ACU Arad	34	13	7	14	42	50	−8	46	
11	Bihorul Beiuș	34	14	2	18	52	72	−20	44	
12	Ineu	34	13	5	16	50	55	−5	44	
13	Victoria Nădlac	34	12	8	14	44	49	−5	44	
14	Gloria CTP Arad	34	13	4	17	45	55	−10	43	
15	Olimpia Satu Mare (R)	34	10	12	12	41	49	−8	42	Relegation to Liga IV
16	Victoria Carei (R)	34	9	6	19	35	58	−23	33	Relegation to Liga IV
17	Fink Fenster Petrești (R)	34	3	5	26	15	103	−88	14	Relegation to Liga IV
18	Florența Still Model Odoreu (R)	34	3	4	27	21	87	−66	13	Relegation to Liga IV

(C) Champions; (P) Promoted; (R) Relegated

== Playoffs ==
=== Group 1 ===
Pos	Team	Pld	W	D	L	GF	GA	GD	Pts	Promotion or relegation
1	Inter Gaz București (P)	2	1	1	0	4	1	+3	4	Promotion to Liga II
2	Juventus București	2	1	1	0	2	1	+1	4	
3	Pambac Bacău	2	0	0	2	0	4	−4	0	

(P) Promoted
- Pambac Bacău – Juventus București 0–1
- Juventus București – Inter Gaz București 1–1
- Pambac Bacău – Inter Gaz București 0–3

=== Group 2 ===
Pos	Team	Pld	W	D	L	GF	GA	GD	Pts	Promotion or relegation
1	Mureșul Deva (P)	2	2	0	0	6	0	+6	6	Promotion to Liga II
2	Luceafărul Lotus Băile Felix	2	1	0	1	3	1	+2	3	
3	Minerul Motru	2	0	0	2	0	8	−8	0	

(P) Promoted
- Luceafărul Băile Felix – Minerul Motru 3–0
- Mureșul Deva – Luceafărul Băile Felix 1–0
- Minerul Motru – Mureșul Deva 0–5

== See also ==
- 2006–07 Liga I
- 2006–07 Liga II
