= FC Sibiu =

- Full name: Fotbal Club Sibiu
- Nicknames: Sibienii (The People from Sibiu); Roș-albaștrii (The Red and Blues)
- Short name: FC Sibiu
- Founded: 2003; 23 years ago
- Dissolved: 2007; 19 years ago
- Ground: Municipal
- Capacity: 14,200
Home colours	Away colours

Fotbal Club Sibiu, commonly known as FC Sibiu or simply Sibiu, was a Romanian professional football club from Sibiu, Sibiu county, founded in 2003 and dissolved in 2007.

== History ==
FC Sibiu was founded in the summer of 2003, at the initiative of the then mayor of Sibiu, Klaus Iohannis, the future president of Romania, and the businessman Werner Keul, to continue the tradition of Sibiu football after the dissolution of the Inter Sibiu and Șoimii Sibiu teams in 2001.

== Honours ==
- Liga II
  - Runners-up (1): 2004–05
- Liga III
  - Winners (1): 2003–04

== League history ==
Season	Tier	Division	Place	Cupa României
2006–07	3	Liga III (Seria V)	17th (R)	
2005–06	2	Divizia B (Seria II)	16th (R)	
2004–05	2	Divizia B (Seria II)	2nd	
2003–04	3	Divizia C (Seria IX)	1st (C, P)	

== Former players ==
The footballers mentioned below have played at least 1 season for FC Sibiu and also played in Liga I for another team.

- (Romania) Radu Neguț
- (Romania) Lucian Cotora
- (Romania) Iosif Tâlvan
- (Romania) Doru Dudiță
- (Romania) Răzvan Dâlbea
- (Romania) Raul Costin
- (Romania) Doru Buican
- (Romania) Eugen Beza

== Former managers ==
- Jean Gavrilă
- Marian Mihail (2005)
- Lucian Burchel (2006)
- Adrian Văsâi (2006)
