= Filiași =

- Town
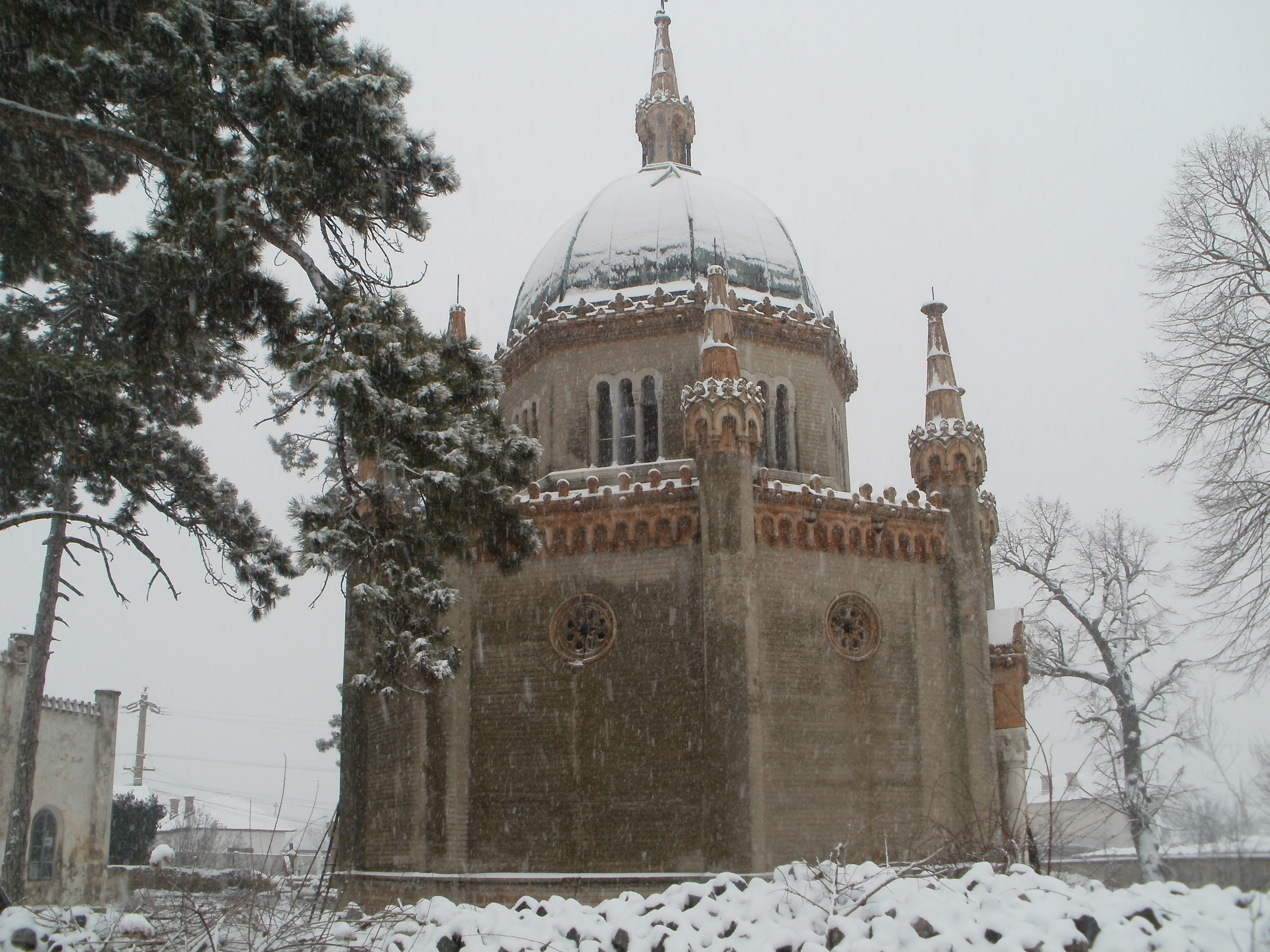
- Filișanu family mausoleum

- Flag

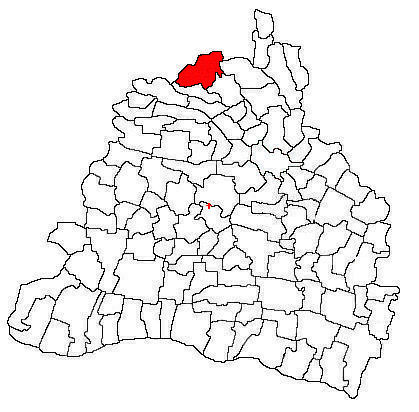
- Location in Dolj County

- Location in Romania
- Coordinates: 44°24′0″N 23°31′12″E
- Country: Romania
- County: Dolj

Government
  - Mayor (2024–2028): Ilie-Costeluș Gheorghe (PSD)
- Area: 99.73 km^{2} (38.51 sq mi)
- Elevation: 118 m (387 ft)
- Population (2021-12-01): 15,031
  - Density: 150.7/km^{2} (390.4/sq mi)
- Time zone: UTC+02:00 (EET)
  - Summer (DST): UTC+03:00 (EEST)
- Postal code: 205300
- Area code: (+40) 02 51
- Vehicle reg.: DJ
- Website: www.primaria-filiasi.ro

Filiași (Romanian pronunciation: [filiˈaʃʲ]) is a town in Dolj County, Oltenia, Romania, on the river Jiu. The town administers six villages: Almăjel, Bâlta, Braniște, Fratoștița, Răcarii de Sus, and Uscăci.

Historical population
Year	Pop.	±%
1977	14,294	—
1992	18,692	+30.8%
2002	20,159	+7.8%
2011	16,900	−16.2%
2021	15,031	−11.1%
Source: Census data

At the 2021 census, the town had a population of 15,031, of which 79.88% were Romanians and 6.46% Roma.

== Natives ==
- Bianca Curmenț (born 1997), handball player
- Ștefan Nanu (born 1968), footballer
- Irinel Popescu (born 1953), surgeon
- Laurențiu Popescu (born 1997), footballer
- Daniel Rogoveanu (born 1995), footballer
