= 2004–05 Divizia C =

Third tier Romanian football league

Divizia C
- Season: 2004–05

The 2004–05 Divizia C was the 49th season of Liga III, the third tier of the Romanian football league system.

== Team changes ==
=== To Divizia C ===
Relegated from Divizia B

- Metalul Plopeni**
- Medgidia**
- Poiana Câmpina
- Rarora Râmnicu Vâlcea
- CSM Reșița
- Oltul Sfântu Gheorghe
- Cimentul Fieni
- FC Baia Mare
- FC Onești
- ARO Câmpulung
- Minaur Zlatna

Promoted from Divizia D

- Politehnica Iași II
- Dorna Vatra Dornei
- Pambac Bacău
- ~~ASA Ecologisul Botoșani~~
- ~~LPS Piatra Neamț~~
- ~~Vitis Șuletea~~
- Junkers Galați
- Farul Constanța II
- Partener Slobozia
- Start Corolla Movila Miresii
- Foresta Nehoiu
- ~~Venus Independența~~
- Chitila
- Tigar Giurgiu
- ~~Mobexpert Ștefănești~~
- ~~Gloria Iris Cornești~~
- Arpechim Pitești
- Carpați Sinaia
- ~~Viitorul Gheorgheni~~
- ~~Recolta Bâlteni~~
- ~~Voința Saelele~~
- ~~Dinamo Tulcea II~~
- Metalul Aiud
- Victoria Nădlac
- Victoria Bod
- Universitatea Reșița
- Știința Cluj-Napoca
- KSE Târgu Secuiesc
- ȘF "Gică Popescu" Craiova
- Arsenal Motru
- Deva II
- Suciu de Sus
- Auxerre Lugoj
- Mureșul Romvelo Luduș
- Florența Odoreu
- ~~Olimpia Salonta~~
- ~~Olimpia Șieuț~~
- Juventus Crișeni
- Sparta Mediaș
- Jimbolia
- Șoimii Vulturu
- Tineretul Râmnicu Vâlcea

=== From Divizia C ===
Promoted to Divizia B

- Botoșani
- Dunărea Galați
- Otopeni
- Ghimbav
- Oltul Slatina
- Politehnica Timișoara
- Unirea Sânicolau Mare
- Unirea Dej
- FC Sibiu
- Dinamo II București
- Liberty Salonta

Relegated to Divizia D

- ~~Bucovina Rădăuți~~
- Laminorul Roman II
- Foresta Fălticeni
- Willy Bacău
- Mondial Brăila
- Metalul Băicoi
- ~~Snagov~~
- Sportul Ciorogârla
- Constructorul Braniștea
- ~~Forex Brașov~~
- Curtea de Argeș
- Torpedo Zărnești
- ~~Petrolul Videle~~
- Dunărea Calafat
- Juventus Bascov
- Dierna Orșova
- Caromet Caransebeș
- Minerul Berbești
- Dacia Orăștie
- Minerul Bărbăteni
- Cuprirom Abrud
- Minerul Turț
- CF Dej
- Mobila Șimleu Silvaniei
- Minerul Iara
- Budvar Odorheiul Secuiesc
- ~~Universitatea Sopo Sibiu~~

=== Renamed teams ===
Victoria Bod was renamed as Victoria Mantrax Bod.

Energia Vulturu was renamed as Șoimii Vulturu.

Nitramonia Făgăraș was renamed as ENA Făgăraș.

Oltul Sfântu Gheorghe was renamed as Transkurier Sfântu Gheorghe.

=== Other changes ===
Victoria Muntenii de Jos and Viitorul Hârlău sold their place.

Snagov and Petrolul Videle bought their place.

Navol Oltenița bought the place of Venus Independența.

Utchim Găești bought the place of Gloria Iris Cornești.

Steaua București II bought the place of Mobexpert Ștefănești.

Rarora Râmnicu Vâlcea ceded its place to newly formed CSM Râmnicu Vâlcea.

CSM Reșița became the satellite team of Universitatea Craiova and was renamed as Universitatea Craiova II.

Chimia Craiova bought the place of Petrolul Stoina.

Alpan U Târgoviște became the satellite team of FCM Târgoviște and was renamed as FCM Târgoviște II.

Cetatea Suceava was formed on the basis of Șoimii Suceava.

Auxerre Orșova was moved from Orșova to Lugoj and renamed as Auxerre Lugoj.

=== Note (**) ===
CSM Medgidia sold its Divizia B place to Liberty Salonta.

Metalul Plopeni sold its Divizia B place to Dinamo București II.

== League tables ==
=== Seria I ===
Pos	Team	Pld	W	D	L	GF	GA	GD	Pts	Qualification or relegation
1	Cetatea Suceava (C, P)	24	16	4	4	41	21	+20	52	Promotion to Divizia B
2	FCM Bacău II	24	15	5	4	42	12	+30	50	
3	Aerostar Bacău	24	14	6	4	46	12	+34	48	
4	Politehnica Iași II	24	12	4	8	44	28	+16	40	
5	Rulmentul Bârlad	24	11	3	10	33	32	+1	36	
6	Minerul Bălan	24	11	1	12	29	38	−9	34	
7	Pambac Bacău	24	9	6	9	35	33	+2	33	
8	Dorna Vatra Dornei	24	10	3	11	30	39	−9	33	
9	CFR Moldova Iași	24	10	2	12	29	40	−11	32	
10	CFR Pașcani	24	8	5	11	28	35	−7	29	
11	Cimentul Bicaz (R)	24	8	2	14	18	36	−18	26	Relegation to Divizia D
12	Ceahlăul Piatra Neamț II (R)	24	4	4	16	16	37	−21	16	Relegation to Divizia D
13	Huși (R)	24	4	3	17	20	48	−28	15	Relegation to Divizia D
14	Bucovina Rădăuți (D)	0	0	0	0	0	0	0	0	Withdrew

Source: romaniansoccer.ro
Rules for classification: 1) Points; 2) Goal difference; 3) Number of goals scored.
(C) Champions; (D) Disqualified; (P) Promoted; (R) Relegated

=== Seria II ===
Pos	Team	Pld	W	D	L	GF	GA	GD	Pts	Qualification or relegation
1	Portul Constanța (C, P)	26	20	3	3	62	14	+48	63	Promotion to Divizia B
2	Petrolul Brăila	26	15	7	4	54	24	+30	52	
3	Dunărea Călărași	26	15	6	5	59	23	+36	51	
4	Petrolul Berca	26	15	4	7	42	25	+17	49	
5	Junkers Galați	26	15	4	7	44	26	+18	49	
6	Oil Terminal Constanța	26	12	5	9	39	32	+7	41	
7	Olimpia Râmnicu Sărat	26	11	7	8	36	25	+11	40	
8	Farul Constanța II	26	12	4	10	45	35	+10	40	
9	Aurora 23 August	26	11	1	14	30	34	−4	34	
10	Șoimii Vulturu	26	9	3	14	22	35	−13	30	
11	Foresta Nehoiu (R)	26	7	3	16	29	60	−31	24	Relegation to Divizia D
12	Medgidia (R)	26	6	3	17	22	38	−16	21	Relegation to Divizia D
13	Partener Slobozia (Note: Partener Slobozia and Start Corolla Movila Miresii withdrew during the winter break and lost all remaining matches with 0−3.) (R)	25	6	3	16	13	49	−36	21	Relegation to Divizia D
14	Start Corolla Movila Miresii (R)	25	0	1	24	4	81	−77	1	Relegation to Divizia D

Source: romaniansoccer.ro
Rules for classification: 1) Points; 2) Goal difference; 3) Number of goals scored.
(C) Champions; (P) Promoted; (R) Relegated

=== Seria III ===
Pos	Team	Pld	W	D	L	GF	GA	GD	Pts	Qualification or relegation
1	Dunărea Giurgiu (C, P)	26	23	3	0	63	14	+49	72	Promotion to Divizia B
2	Chitila	26	15	3	8	51	33	+18	48	
3	Mogoșoaia	26	13	5	8	48	28	+20	44	
4	ROVA Roșiori	26	12	7	7	33	28	+5	43	
5	Snagov	26	12	6	8	40	27	+13	42	
6	Petrolul Videle	26	12	3	11	37	39	−2	39	
7	Navol Oltenița	26	11	4	11	36	38	−2	37	
8	Tigar Giurgiu	26	10	6	10	35	38	−3	36	
9	Turris Turnu Măgurele	26	9	8	9	29	32	−3	35	
10	Steaua București II	26	10	4	12	35	35	0	34	
11	Petrolul Bolintin-Vale (Note: Petrolul Bolintin-Vale withdrew after 24 rounds and lost all remaining matches with 0−3.) (R)	26	7	7	12	22	31	−9	28	Relegation to Divizia D
12	Aversa București (R)	26	5	6	15	24	42	−18	21	Relegation to Divizia D
13	Faur București (R)	26	4	6	16	29	51	−22	18	Relegation to Divizia D
14	Dunărea Zimnicea (Note: Dunărea Zimnicea withdrew during the winter break and lost all remaining matches with 0−3.) (R)	26	3	4	19	16	62	−46	13	Relegation to Divizia D

Source: romaniansoccer.ro
Rules for classification: 1) Points; 2) Goal difference; 3) Number of goals scored.
(C) Champions; (P) Promoted; (R) Relegated

=== Seria IV ===
Pos	Team	Pld	W	D	L	GF	GA	GD	Pts	Qualification or relegation
1	Poiana Câmpina (C, P)	24	15	3	6	48	19	+29	48	Promotion to Divizia B
2	Chimia Brazi	24	13	5	6	35	27	+8	44	
3	Conpet Ploiești	24	12	4	8	40	30	+10	40	
4	Cimentul Fieni	24	11	5	8	39	29	+10	38	
5	Tricolorul Breaza	24	9	9	6	26	19	+7	36	
6	Petrolul Târgoviște	24	9	5	10	23	27	−4	32	
7	Petrolistul Boldești	24	8	7	9	24	27	−3	31	
8	FCM Târgoviște II	24	9	3	12	21	26	−5	30	
9	Electrosid Titu	24	9	3	12	26	28	−2	30	
10	Flacăra Moreni	24	8	6	10	28	34	−6	30	
11	Utchim Găești (R)	24	8	5	11	30	36	−6	29	Relegation to Divizia D
12	Carpați Sinaia (R)	24	7	5	12	21	38	−17	26	Relegation to Divizia D
13	Arpechim Pitești (R)	24	5	6	13	20	41	−21	21	Relegation to Divizia D
14	ARO Câmpulung (Note: ARO Câmpulung withdrew before the start of the season.) (D)	0	0	0	0	0	0	0	0	Withdrew

Source: romaniansoccer.ro
Rules for classification: 1) Points; 2) Goal difference; 3) Number of goals scored.
(C) Champions; (D) Disqualified; (P) Promoted; (R) Relegated

=== Seria V ===
Pos	Team	Pld	W	D	L	GF	GA	GD	Pts	Qualification or relegation
1	Râmnicu Vâlcea (C, P)	20	13	6	1	36	11	+25	45	Promotion to Divizia B
2	Universitatea Craiova II	20	11	5	4	35	17	+18	38	
3	Chimia Craiova	20	11	2	7	43	29	+14	35	
4	Armata Craiova	20	10	4	6	31	21	+10	34	
5	ȘF "Gică Popescu" Craiova	20	9	3	8	22	20	+2	30	
6	Progresul Corabia	20	9	2	9	23	29	−6	29	
7	Oltchim Râmnicu Vâlcea	20	6	5	9	21	27	−6	23	
8	Olt Scornicești	20	6	5	9	26	42	−16	23	
9	Știința CFR Craiova	20	5	5	10	19	25	−6	20	
10	Senaco Novaci	20	4	5	11	15	30	−15	17	
11	Petrolul Țicleni (R)	20	3	4	13	12	32	−20	13	Relegation to Divizia D
12	Prodchim Balș (Note: Prodchim Balș and Electro Craiova were expelled for two no-shows and all their results were canceled.) (D)	0	0	0	0	0	0	0	0	Excluded
13	Electro Craiova (D)	0	0	0	0	0	0	0	0	Excluded
14	Tineretul Râmnicu Vâlcea (Note: Tineretul Râmnicu Vâlcea withdrew before the start of the season.) (D)	0	0	0	0	0	0	0	0	Withdrew

Source: romaniansoccer.ro
Rules for classification: 1) Points; 2) Goal difference; 3) Number of goals scored.
(C) Champions; (D) Disqualified; (P) Promoted; (R) Relegated

=== Seria VI ===
Pos	Team	Pld	W	D	L	GF	GA	GD	Pts	Qualification or relegation
1	CFR Timișoara (C, P)	24	17	4	3	58	26	+32	55	Promotion to Divizia B
2	Universitatea Reșița	24	10	9	5	34	26	+8	39	
3	UM Timișoara	24	10	7	7	36	25	+11	37	
4	EMC Rovinari	24	11	4	9	30	29	+1	37	
5	Hexe Timișoara	24	11	3	10	32	24	+8	36	
6	Auxerre Lugoj	24	9	8	7	26	28	−2	35	
7	Minerul Mehedinți	24	10	5	9	29	29	0	35	
8	Jimbolia	24	8	7	9	26	26	0	31	
9	Severnav Drobeta-Turnu Severin	24	9	3	12	34	40	−6	30	
10	Minerul Mătăsari	24	8	5	11	27	29	−2	29	
11	Arsenal Motru (R)	24	8	4	12	24	35	−11	28	Relegation to Divizia D
12	Minerul Moldova Nouă (R)	24	6	5	13	16	26	−10	23	Relegation to Divizia D
13	Gloria Reșița (R)	24	4	6	14	19	48	−29	18	Relegation to Divizia D

Source: romaniansoccer.ro
Rules for classification: 1) Points; 2) Goal difference; 3) Number of goals scored.
(C) Champions; (P) Promoted; (R) Relegated

=== Seria VII ===
Pos	Team	Pld	W	D	L	GF	GA	GD	Pts	Qualification or relegation
1	Minerul Lupeni (C, P)	24	19	2	3	46	15	+31	59	Promotion to Divizia B
2	Soda Ocna Mureș	24	11	7	6	27	24	+3	40	
3	Metalul Aiud	24	12	4	8	37	26	+11	40	
4	Deva II	24	12	2	10	41	24	+17	38	
5	Vulcan	24	11	5	8	31	21	+10	38	
6	Victoria Nădlac	24	11	4	9	25	20	+5	37	
7	Telecom Arad	24	11	2	11	32	21	+11	35	
8	Aurul Brad	24	9	7	8	30	32	−2	34	
9	Sparta Mediaș	24	9	5	10	31	30	+1	32	
10	Inter Blaj	24	8	7	9	40	34	+6	31	
11	Universitatea Sopo Sibiu (R)	24	6	9	9	31	34	−3	27	Relegation to Divizia D
12	Frontiera Curtici (R)	24	3	5	16	16	66	−50	14	Relegation to Divizia D
13	Inter Petrila (R)	24	4	1	19	14	54	−40	13	Relegation to Divizia D
14	Hârtia Petrești (Note: Hârtia Petrești withdrew before the start of the season.) (D)	0	0	0	0	0	0	0	0	Withdrew

Source: romaniansoccer.ro
Rules for classification: 1) Points; 2) Goal difference; 3) Number of goals scored.
(C) Champions; (D) Disqualified; (P) Promoted; (R) Relegated

=== Seria VIII ===
Pos	Team	Pld	W	D	L	GF	GA	GD	Pts	Qualification or relegation
1	Forex Brașov (C, P)	26	19	3	4	51	13	+38	60	Promotion to Divizia B
2	ASA Târgu Mureș	26	15	5	6	42	26	+16	50	
3	Mureșul Romvelo Luduș	26	12	6	8	31	26	+5	42	
4	Tractorul Brașov	26	12	4	10	39	31	+8	40	
5	Chimica Târnăveni	26	11	7	8	34	26	+8	40	
6	Avântul Silva Reghin	26	12	3	11	27	24	+3	39	
7	Transkurier Sfântu Gheorghe	26	10	8	8	25	20	+5	38	
8	Lacul Ursu Mobila Sovata	26	10	7	9	31	37	−6	37	
9	Gaz Metan Târgu Mureș	26	10	7	9	29	28	+1	37	
10	Unirea Ungheni	26	11	4	11	34	38	−4	37	
11	ENA Făgăraș (R)	26	10	5	11	29	31	−2	35	Relegation to Divizia D
12	Predeal (R)	26	7	7	12	23	26	−3	28	Relegation to Divizia D
13	Victoria Mantrax Bod (R)	26	5	4	17	21	45	−24	19	Relegation to Divizia D
14	KSE Târgu Secuiesc (R)	26	2	2	22	11	56	−45	8	Relegation to Divizia D

Source: romaniansoccer.ro
Rules for classification: 1) Points; 2) Goal difference; 3) Number of goals scored.
(C) Champions; (P) Promoted; (R) Relegated

=== Seria IX ===
Pos	Team	Pld	W	D	L	GF	GA	GD	Pts	Qualification or relegation
1	Gloria Bistrița II (C, P)	24	18	2	4	44	11	+33	56	Promotion to Divizia B
2	Victoria Carei	24	14	4	6	51	23	+28	46	
3	Arieșul Turda	24	15	0	9	46	31	+15	45	
4	Olimpia Gherla	24	14	2	8	38	22	+16	44	
5	Someș Gaz Beclean	24	12	3	9	43	27	+16	39	
6	Someșul Satu Mare	24	12	2	10	41	31	+10	38	
7	Bihorul Beiuș	24	11	5	8	27	20	+7	38	
8	Florența Odoreu	24	10	6	8	32	32	0	36	
9	Baia Mare	24	12	6	6	38	18	+20	35 (Note: Baia Mare deducted 7 points penalty from last season in Divizia B.)	
10	Minerul Sărmășag	24	9	4	11	37	36	+1	31	
11	Suciu de Sus (Note: Suciu de Sus withdrew after 21 rounds and lost all remaining matches with 0−3.) (R)	24	4	5	15	20	51	−31	17	Relegation to Divizia D
12	Știința Cluj-Napoca (R)	24	5	1	18	27	74	−47	16	Relegation to Divizia D
13	Gloria Renel Baia Mare (Note: Gloria Renel Baia Mare withdrew during the winter break and lost all remaining matches with 0−3.) (R)	24	0	0	24	7	75	−68	0	Relegation to Divizia D
14	Juventus Crișeni (Note: Juventus Crișeni withdrew before the start of the season.) (D)	0	0	0	0	0	0	0	0	Withdrew

Source: romaniansoccer.ro
Rules for classification: 1) Points; 2) Goal difference; 3) Number of goals scored.
(C) Champions; (D) Disqualified; (P) Promoted; (R) Relegated

== See also ==
- 2004–05 Divizia A
- 2004–05 Divizia B
- 2004–05 Divizia D
- 2004–05 Cupa României
