= CS Victoria Vânju Mare =

Romanian football club

Victoria Vânju Mare
- Full name: Clubul Sportiv Victoria Vânju Mare
- Nicknames: Vânjenii (The People from Vânju Mare); Mehedințenii (The People from Mehedinți) Constructorii (The Builders)
- Short name: Victoria
- Founded: 1960; 66 years ago as Victoria Vânju Mare; 2002; 24 years ago as Building Vânju Mare; 2011; 15 years ago as Real Vânju Mare; 2018; 8 years ago (refounded)
- Ground: Victoria
- Capacity: 1,500
- Owner: Vânju Mare Town
- Chairman: Nelu Mănoaica
- Manager: Nistor Poiană
- League: Liga IV
- 2025–26: Liga IV, Mehedinți County, 11th of 14
| Home colours | Away colours |

Club Sportiv Victoria Vânju Mare, commonly known as Victoria Vânju Mare or simply as Victoria, is a Romanian football club based in Vânju Mare, Mehedinți County. Founded in 1960, it currently competes in Liga IV – Mehedinți County, the fourth tier of Romanian football.

The club was established in the early 1960s and before 1990 won four county championships, finally earning promotion to Liga III at the end of the 1985–86 season. After 1990, the club was re-organized as Real Vânju Mare and once again won the county league in 2002. In the same summer, the club was re-organized as Building Vânju Mare through a merger between Real Vânju Mare and Constructorul Drobeta-Turnu Severin.

Building initially played its home matches at the Municipal Stadium in Drobeta-Turnu Severin, later moving to Victoria Stadium in Vânju Mare and Dunărea Stadium in Orșova. At its best, Building played in the second tier, Liga II, but without achieving notable results. Building Vânju Mare was owned by Mihaela Giuca, the first woman to be in charge of a football club in Romania. The club was dissolved in 2009 but was re-founded in 2011 under the name Real Vânju Mare.

Real Vânju Mare played for a few seasons in the fourth division before being dissolved again in 2014. In 2018, the club was re-founded once more, this time under its historical name, Victoria Vânju Mare..

== History ==
Victoria Vânju Mare was established in the early 1960s and played in the regional and county championships and before 1990 won four county championships, finally earning promotion to Liga III at the end of the 1985–86 season, defeating Jiul IEELIF Craiova, the Dolj County Championship winner, 5–3 on aggregate. After 1990 the club was re-organized as Real Vânju Mare and won again the county league in 2002.

Building Vânju Mare logo used between 2002 and 2009.

In the same summer, the club was re-organized as Building Vânju Mare by the merger between Real Vânju Mare and Constructorul Drobeta-Turnu Severin., as a result of the merger between the newly promoted in the third tier, AS Real Vânju Mare and the 4th tier member, Constructorul Drobeta-Turnu Severin, owned by Mihaela Giuca. The new team obtained the promotion to Divizia B after only one year since its establishment.

In the seven seasons of existence, "the Builders" activated in the third tier (Liga III) during the 2002–03 (2nd place), 2005–06 (1st place), 2007–08 (7th place) and 2008–09 (5th place) seasons, and in the Liga II during the 2003–04 (12th place), 2004–05 (14th place) and 2006–07 (15th place) editions.

Mihaela Giuca's team played its home matches on the Municipal Stadium in Drobeta-Turnu Severin in the first two seasons of Divizia B. After the first relegation, in 2005, Building returned on the Victoria Stadium in Vânju Mare, with a capacity of 1,000 seats. After another three years, Building moved to Orșova, following a conflict with the Commune of Vânju Mare, which allowed Minerul Mehedinți to play its home matches on the same ground.

Building withdrew from Liga III in the summer of 2009 and subsequently was dissolved. Building was dissolved in 2009, but was again re-founded in 2011, under the old name of Real Vânju Mare. Real Vânju Mare played for a couple of seasons in the 4th division, then was dissolved again in 2014, then in 2018 was re-founded under the historical name of the club, Victoria Vânju Mare.

== Honours ==
=== Leagues ===
Liga III

- Winners (1): 2005–06
- Runners-up (1): 2002–03

Liga IV – Mehedinți County

- Winners (5): 1969–70, 1983–84, 1984–85, 1985–86, 2001–02

== Chronology of names ==
| Name | Period |
| Victoria Vânju Mare | 1960–1985 |
| Înainte-Foresta Vânju Mare | 1985–1986 |
| Victoria-Înainte Vânju Mare | 1986–1987 |
| Victoria Vânju Mare | 1987–2000 |
| Real Vânju Mare | 2000–2002 |
| Building Vânju Mare | 2002–2009 |
| *not active at senior level | 2009–2011 |
| Real Vânju Mare | 2011–2014 |
| *not active at senior level | 2014–2018 |
| Victoria Vânju Mare | 2018–present |
