= Stadionul Victoria =

There are several stadiums in Romania with the name Stadionul Victoria:

- Stadionul Victoria (Vânju Mare)
- Stadionul Victoria (București), renamed Stadionul Florea Dumitrache.
- Stadionul Victoria-Cetate
- Stadionul Victoria Someșeni
