= Ion Turnagiu =

Romanian serial killer

- Born: Ion Cristian Turnagiu; 12 February 1975; Vânju Mare, Mehedinți County, Romania
- Died: 30 June 2020 (aged 45); Drobeta-Turnu Severin Hospital, Drobeta-Turnu Severin, Romania
- Cause of death: Suicide by hanging
- Conviction: Murder x4
- Penalty: Life imprisonment

Details
- Victims: 4 (including a pregnant woman)
- Span of crimes: March – November 1993
- Country: Romania
- States: Timiș, Bucharest, Mehedinți
- Date apprehended: For the last time in June 2020

Ion Cristian Turnagiu (12 February 1975 – 30 June 2020) was a Romanian serial killer. Initially convicted of murdering 4 people during robberies in 1993, he was convicted and sentenced to life imprisonment, but later paroled.

His release became the subject of intense controversy in 2020, after he was arrested for attempting to burn a 17-year-old girl alive after dousing her with gasoline. Turnagiu was arrested again, but died from complications resulting from a suicide attempt just a month later.

== Early life ==
Turnagiu was born in Vânju Mare on 12 February 1975. He was adopted by his mother's boyfriend as a baby, with the family living a seemingly normal life. This all changed around 1986, when Turnagiu's mother abandoned the family and committed suicide shortly afterwards.

He was then placed in the care of his maternal grandparents, but was unable to adapt. Turnagiu eventually dropped out of school and fled from home, wandering across the country and surviving by committing petty thefts. He would then use the stolen money on alcohol or slot machines, finding shelter in train station waiting rooms.

== Murders ==
=== Thefts and murders ===
In early 1993, shortly after his 18th birthday, Turnagiu stole a bicycle from his grandparents' home and went to visit an uncle of his living in Mehedinți County. He robbed a total of 36,000 lei in cash and valuables from the residence, as well as two property titles. He traveled by train to Timișoara, where he managed to convince an elderly man to hire him for some work at his native village of Racovița, where Turnagiu was supposed to help the man's 20-year-old pregnant daughter with the housework and plowing the fields. During the conversation, he introduced himself under an alias.

On 3 March 1993, while Turnagiu was working in the fields with the other men from his employer's family, he suddenly got on the nearest tractor and started driving towards the village. Along the way, he crashed into a ditch, but managed to crawl out unharmed and run towards the house, where he intended to break into their cash drawer, steal the money, and flee. In order to break the drawer's lock, he grabbed an axe from the yard and started repeatedly hitting it, drawing the attention of his employer's daughter, who came running from the neighbor's home after hearing loud noises. When she caught him in the act, Turnagiu struck her on the head with the axe, killing her on the spot. He then stole the money, got on a bicycle left in the yard, and immediately fled the village.

Turnagiu then took a train ride to Bucharest, where he stayed with his grandparents for a short period of time before fleeing again, afraid that the police were going to arrest him for some petty thefts. For the remainder of the summer, Turnagiu roamed around the country until he ended up in Bucharest again circa late September 1993, loitering around the city's Rahova neighborhood. Around that time, an elderly man who resided on Calea Rahovi started occasionally giving him some food and money out of compassion, much to the objections of his wife, who suspected that the young homeless man had bad intentions.

Despite the good treatment he received from the man, Turnagiu decided to rob him once he learned that the man had recently received a large sum of money from an inheritance. On the morning of 30 September, he went to the man's house again and was welcomed in. At one point, Turnagiu excused himself and went to the bathroom, after which he started looking for the money. He was caught in the act by the wife, whereupon he grabbed a knife and started repeatedly stabbing her. He then went back to the kitchen and also stabbed to death the elderly man. After the murders, he ransacked the house for money and valuables, stealing 100,000 lei, gold jewelry, and clothing. The elderly couple's bodies were found approximately a week later.

=== Suicide attempt and final murder ===
After stealing the money, Turnagiu briefly had a relationship with a ballerina, on whom he spend almost everything. The woman left him shortly afterwards, prompting Turnagiu to attempt suicide by swallowing medication on 4 October. He was found by passers-by and rushed to a nearby hospital, where he was diagnosed with as a mood disorder. Once he recovered, Turnagiu escaped from the hospital and continued wandering around Romania.

In mid-November 1993, he arrived in Drobeta-Turnu Severin, where he searched for more victims to rob. On 21 November, he was dining at a restaurant he had visited in his childhood when he accidentally came across an old schoolmate who was going to visit his brother in the army. Sensing an opportunity, he convinced the schoolmate to drink into excess and then lured him behind the train station, where Turnagiu stabbed the intoxicated man to death. He then robbed him of all his valuables and clothing, leaving the victim only in his underwear.

== Arrest, trial, and imprisonment ==
Shortly after the murder, several witnesses identified Turnagiu as the man last seen accompanying the victim prior to him being found dead. As a result, he was sought as a suspect in the case, and arrested six days later. During subsequent interrogations, he was quickly linked to three previous murders. Prior to his trial, Turnagiu was ordered to undergo a forensic psychiatric evaluation, which concluded that he had an antisocial personality disorder.

Turnagiu was captured and sentenced to life imprisonment in 1994, with his original release date being set for November 2091. He served a majority of his sentence at the Drobeta-Turnu Severin Penitentiary, as well as other prisons across the country.

=== Release ===
On 10 May 2019, the Mehedinți County Court ruled to grant Turnagiu conditional release, justifying the decision on the grounds that he actively participated in productive activities during his incarceration and outwardly appeared ready to readapt to society. His release was possible due to a sentence-reduction mechanism promoted by Tudorel Toader, the Minister of Justice serving under Viorica Dăncilă. This ruling sparked intense public controversy and led to dismissals among the prison's leadership.

Once on the outside, Turnagiu temporarily moved to the Netherlands, where one of his brothers lived. When he returned to Romania, he resided at a friend's house in Dârvari, Mehedinți County, where he lived unofficially for some time. Later on, facing pressure from the parole authorities, he registered the residence as his legal domicile. Turnagiu later moved to another house in the city, where he was allowed to live on the condition that he took care of it while the owner was working in Italy.

During this period, Turnagiu opened an account on Facebook, where he posted various photos of his trips around Romania and the Netherlands, as well as befriending the father of a future victim.

== Attempted murder, arrest, and suicide ==
About a year after his release, in early June 2020, Turnagiu attacked a 17-year-old girl in Dârvari, whom he raped and beat up. The victim – identified in the media only by her first name, Măriuca – reported the incident to the local police. Turnagiu learned of this and decided to take revenge on her, posting several cryptic messages and a video on Facebook. He then tracked her down, and on 13 June, he confronted her, doused her in gasoline, and lit her on fire. The young woman managed to survive, although she suffered extremely severe burns that required specialized medical treatment in Bad Klosterlausnitz, Germany. Turnagiu was arrested and detained at the local police station, where he was additionally arraigned on attempted murder charges in addition to the ones stemming from the rape.

In late June, Turnagiu attempted suicide in police custody by hanging himself with a T-shirt. He initially survived the attempt and was rushed to the nearest hospital in Drobeta-Turnu Severin, but remained in a coma. His condition eventually worsened, and he succumbed to his injuries on 30 June.

On Christmas Eve 2020, Măriuca shared a message through the "În numele lui Alexandru" Association in which she thanked everybody who had supported her treatment. She later returned to Romania and resumed her studies, sharing in a media interview that she wanted to become a trauma therapist.

=== Public outcry and investigations ===
As the attempted murder case caused widespread shock and outrage across the country, local and national authorities started an investigation into how and why a violent criminal like Turnagiu was released early. As a result, prison director Răzvan Lăpuște and the director of the Social Reintegration Directorate Petrișor Ridichie were dismissed from their positions, and an investigation into the conduct of the Mehedinți County Court was initiated. Both Lăpuște and Ridichie later successfully appealed the dismissals and were reinstated. Three years later, Lăpuște applied for early retirement on the grounds of being sick with an unspecified illness, which was granted.

The case also led to changes in the Criminal Code regarding parole for violent offenders and the handling of rape cases. The most notable of these was the unanimous adoption of a bill proposed by Florin Roman, which stipulates that convicts convicted of crimes such as murder, rape, and robbery would no longer be eligible for early release. This amendment was challenged by the High Court of Cassation and Justice.

== See also ==
- List of serial killers by country

== Books ==
- Tandin, Traian (2022). Discipolii crimei in Romania [Disciples of crime in Romania] (in Romanian). ISBN 978-606-9018-31-6.
