= Stadionul Victoria (Vânju Mare) =

Sports venue in Vânju Mare, Romania

- Interactive map of Stadionul Victoria
- Address: Str. Rahova
- Location: Vânju Mare, Romania
- Coordinates: 44°26′11.3″N 22°52′35.2″E
- Owner: Town of Vânju Mare
- Operator: Victoria Vânju Mare
- Capacity: 1,500 seated
- Surface: Grass

Construction
- Opened: 1960
- Renovated: 2002, 2005

Tenant
- Victoria Vânju Mare (1960–present)

Victoria Stadium is a multi-purpose stadium in Vânju Mare, Romania. It is currently used mostly for football matches, is the home ground of Victoria Vânju Mare and holds 1,500 people. In the past, teams such as FC Drobeta-Turnu Severin or Minerul Mehedinți played their home matches here, for short period of time.
