= CS Auxerre Lugoj =

Romanian football club

Auxerre Lugoj
- Full name: Club Sportiv Auxerre Lugoj
- Nicknames: Lugojenii (The people from Lugoj)
- Short name: Auxerre Lugoj
- Founded: 2002
- Dissolved: 2009
- Ground: Tineretului
- Capacity: 6,000
Home colours

Clubul Sportiv Auxerre Lugoj, commonly known as Auxerre Lugoj, was a Romanian football club based in Lugoj, Timiș County, founded in 2002 and dissolved in 2009. The club last played in the third league in the 2007–08 Liga III season.

== History ==
The club was founded in 2002 in Orșova, Mehedinți County as Auxerre Trans Orșova and promoted to Divizia C at the end of 2003–04 season winning the Divizia D – Mehedinți County series.

After the promotion, the club was moved to Lugoj finishing the first season in the third division on 6th place in Series VI.

Auxerre, coached by Cosmin Petruescu, promoted to the second division at the end of 2005–06 season, finishing 1st in the Series VII of the third division seven points ahead of main challenger UM Timișoara and ten lengths clear of 3rd-placed Hexe Jebel, impressing primarily defensively. In 26 matches, "Lugojenii" have conceded only 9 goals.

Despite the good start of the 2006–07 Liga II season, the club relegated back in the third league finishing in last place with 25 points.

They final years as an active club became from bad to worse. In 2008 the club finished 18th place, withdrew from the league in the first part of the championship. In the 2008–09 season the club did not play in any competition. The club went defunct, because of lack of results in their final seasons. Also in 2009 CSM Lugoj was founded and they enrolled in the fifth league, and in 2012 they renamed back to Vulturii Lugoj.

During these years, the notable football players such as Mihai Pintilii, Cristian Melinte, Alin Șeroni, Ovidiu Mihalache, Cristian Pușcaș, Emil Szolomajer among others, have played in Auxerre Lugoj colours.

== Honours ==
Liga III

- Winners (1): 2005–06

Liga IV – Mehedinți County

- Winners (1): 2003–04
