= 2002–03 Divizia C =

Third tier Romanian football league

Divizia C
- Season: 2002–03

The 2002–03 Divizia C season was the 47th season of Divizia C, the third tier of the Romanian football league system.

The format was maintained with eight series of sixteen teams each, with each series played in a double round-robin format. At the end of the season, twenty teams were promoted to Divizia B — the top two teams from each Divizia C series, as well as the four best third-placed teams — as the second tier was expanded into three groups of 16 teams each.

At the same time, the bottom three teams from each series, along with the four lowest-ranked 13th-placed teams, twenty-eight teams in total, were relegated and replaced by the forty-two county winners, as Divizia C was reorganized into nine groups of fourteen teams each.

== Team changes ==
=== To Divizia C ===
Relegated from Divizia B

- Dinamo Poiana Câmpina
- Petrolul Moinești
- ASA Târgu Mureș
- Laminorul Roman
- Jiul Petroșani
- Rocar București

Promoted from Divizia D

- Filatura Fălticeni
- Letea Bacău
- Viitorul Hârlău
- Turistul Pietroasa Haleș
- Metalul Băicoi
- Sportul Ciorogârla
- Fulgerul Lerești
- Progresul Caracal
- Real Vânju Mare
- Turris Turnu Măgurele
- Vulcan
- Textila Cisnădie
- Torpedo Zărnești
- Dej
- Frontiera Curtici
- Plastunion Satulung
- Victoria Carei

=== From Divizia C ===
Promoted to Divizia B

- Poli Unirea Iași
- Gloria Buzău
- Medgidia
- Rulmentul Alexandria
- Gilortul Târgu Cărbunești
- Corvinul Hunedoara
- CFR Cluj

Relegated to Divizia D

- Foresta Fălticeni II
- Gloria Zemeș
- Juventus Focșani
- Scorillo Grădiștea (withdrew)
- Dinamo Agricultorul Gârbovi (withdrew)
- Unirea Mânăstirea (withdrew)
- Paulo BTA București (withdrew)
- Drobeta-Turnu Severin (withdrew)
- Inter Petrila
- Aurul Brad
- Viitorul Gheorgheni
- Apemin Borsec (withdrew)
- Liber Humana Șomcuta Mare (withdrew)
- Șoimii Satu Mare (withdrew)
- Lăpușul Târgu Lăpuș (withdrew)
- Viitorul Oradea (withdrew)
- Minerul Iara (withdrew)

=== Other changes ===
- Following the dissolution of FC Politehnica Timișoara, AEK București — recently promoted to Divizia A — merged with the Divizia C side CSU Politehnica Timișoara to form Politehnica AEK Timișoara.
- Olimpia Satu Mare, which was relegated in the previous season, bought the place of Tractorul Brașov, which thus competed in the third tier.
- Metrom Brașov sell its the second division place to Bucovina Suceava and subsequently was dissolved.
- Sportul Municipal Vaslui was dissolved.
- Perkő Sânzieni and CFR Constanța declined promotion.
- Forestierul Stâlpeni and Minerul Uricani were spared from relegation.
- Letea Bacău were acquired by FCM Bacău and compete as FCM Bacău II after eleven rounds.
- Victoria TC Galați was moved from Galați to Vaslui and was renamed FC Vaslui.
- Rarora Râmnicu Vâlcea bought the place of Parângul Novaci.
- Senaco Novaci bought the place of Mecanica Motru.
- Dunărea Calafat entered in partnership with ȘF "Gică Popescu" Craiova and was renamed ȘF "Gică Popescu" Calafat.
- Oltul Slatina bought the place of Viitorul Râmnicu Vâlcea.
- Avântul Silva Reghin took the place of Telecom Iași.
- CS Otopeni took the place of Conired Pucioasa.
- Pro Mobila Crucea, AS Neptun and Soda Ocna Mureș sold their place.
- Proodeftiki Adjud, FC Snagov and Petrom Marghita bought a place.
- Petrolul Unirea Bolintin-Vale was renamed Petrolul Bolintin-Vale.
- Național Dunărea Giurgiu was renamed Dunărea Giurgiu.
- Pan Group Armata Craiova was renamed Armata Craiova.
- Real Vânju Mare was renamed Building Vânju Mare
- Minerul Certej was renamed CS Certej.
- ACU Astra Trinity Arad was renamed ACU Arad.
- Metalurgistul Cugir was renamed FC Cugir 1939.
- FC Sfântu Gheorghe was renamed Oltul Sfântu Gheorghe.
- Bucegi Predeal was renamed FC Predeal.

== League tables ==
=== Series I ===
==== League table ====
Pos	Team	Pld	W	D	L	GF	GA	GD	Pts	Promotion or relegation
1	Petrolul Moinești (C, P)	28	22	2	4	57	16	+41	68	Promotion to Divizia B
2	Laminorul Roman (P)	28	21	2	5	53	23	+30	65	Promotion to Divizia B
3	Vaslui (P)	28	21	2	5	76	15	+61	65	Promotion to Divizia B
4	CFR Pașcani	28	13	5	10	41	37	+4	44	
5	Rulmentul Bârlad	28	12	3	13	31	30	+1	39	
6	FCM Bacău II	28	11	6	11	36	34	+2	39	
7	Botoșani	28	12	3	13	40	31	+9	39	
8	Cimentul Bicaz	28	11	5	12	33	30	+3	38	
9	Aerostar Bacău	28	10	6	12	33	40	−7	36	
10	Viitorul Hârlău	28	11	2	15	32	46	−14	35	
11	Rafinăria Dărmănești	28	10	4	14	34	40	−6	34	
12	Ceahlăul Piatra Neamț II	28	10	3	15	40	73	−33	33	
13	RATC CFR Moldova Iași	28	9	6	13	26	33	−7	33	
14	Bucovina Rădăuți (R)	28	7	3	18	25	45	−20	24	Relegation to Divizia D
15	Unirea Negrești (Note: Unirea Negrești withdrew after the winter break and lost all remaining matches with 0–3.) (R)	28	3	2	23	10	74	−64	11	Relegation to Divizia D
16	Filatura Fălticeni (Note: Filatura Fălticeni withdrew before the start of the championship.) (D)	0	0	0	0	0	0	0	0	Withdrew

Source: rsssf.org
Rules for classification: 1) Points; 2) Goal difference; 3) Number of goals scored.
(C) Champions; (D) Disqualified; (P) Promoted; (R) Relegated

==== Results ====
Home \ Away	MOI	VAS	ROM	CFR	RUL	CBI	BAC	BOT	AER	VHL	MOL	RAF	CEA	BUC	NEG
Petrolul Moinești		3–2	2–0	4–0	3–0	2–0	3–1	3–1	4–1	2–0	–	2–0	4–2	3–1	3–0
FC Vaslui	1–2		2–0	7–0	4–0	–	2–0	3–1	1–0	2–0	3–1	5–0	9–0	4–1	4–0
Laminorul Roman	1–0	3–0		1–0	2–0	1–0	2–1	2–1	2–1	3–0	3–1	1–0	3–0	–	5–0
CFR Pașcani	0–2	1–0	0–2		1–0	3–0	4–0	1–1	2–2	2–0	–	2–0	7–2	2–0	4–1
Rulmentul Bârlad	0–0	0–1	–	2–0		4–2	2–1	4–1	3–0	2–0	1–0	2–0	2–1	2–0	3–0
Cimentul Bicaz	–	0–2	2–2	3–1	2–0		1–0	0–1	3–0	1–0	2–0	1–0	0–1	3–2	3–0
FCM Bacău II	0–1	0–1	1–2	0–1	1–0	4–0		3–1	0–0	5–0	1–0	3–0	5–0	2–1	1–1
FC Botoșani	1–0	0–1	0–1	1–1	0–0	0–0	3–1		–	4–2	3–2	–	2–0	2–1	3–0
Aerostar Bacău	1–0	–	1–0	0–1	1–0	3–1	1–2	2–3		3–0	1–0	1–1	5–2	1–0	3–0
Viitorul Hârlău	1–2	1–3	3–3	–	1–0	0–2	0–1	3–1	3–2		3–1	1–0	1–0	2–1	3–0
CFR Moldova Iași	0–3	0–0	2–0	2–0	3–0	2–1	1–0	1–0	2–0	1–1		0–2	1–1	2–1	0–0
Rafinăria Dărmănești	1–2	0–3	5–3	2–0	0–0	0–0	2–1	2–2	3–0	0–1	2–1		–	2–0	3–0
Ceahlăul Piatra Neamț II	1–4	0–9	0–2	2–3	3–1	2–1	1–1	1–0	2–2	–	3–1	3–1		2–0	4–2
Bucovina Rădăuți	0–1	2–1	1–2	0–0	1–0	1–1	1–2	1–0	2–0	1–3	0–0	2–1	1–0		–
Unirea Negrești	1–0	0–3	0–3	0–3	1–3	0–4	–	0–1	0–1	1–0	0–3	0–3	0–3	3–2	

Source: rsssf.org
Legend: Blue = home team win; Yellow = draw; Red = away team win.

=== Series II ===
==== League table ====
Pos	Team	Pld	W	D	L	GF	GA	GD	Pts	Promotion or relegation
1	Unirea Urziceni (C, P)	28	21	3	4	49	16	+33	66	Promotion to Divizia B
2	Poiana Câmpina (P)	28	18	7	3	68	21	+47	61	Promotion to Divizia B
3	Chimia Brazi	28	17	7	4	67	23	+44	58	
4	Tricolorul Breaza	28	16	5	7	52	32	+20	53	
5	Conpet Ploiești	28	13	5	10	52	29	+23	44	
6	Petrolul Berca	28	13	5	10	55	44	+11	44	
7	Petrolul Brăila	28	14	2	12	50	47	+3	44	
8	Petrolistul Boldești	28	13	4	11	42	35	+7	43	
9	Tractorul Brașov	28	11	3	14	48	43	+5	36	
10	Dunărea Galați	28	10	5	13	36	30	+6	35	
11	Turistul Pietroasa Haleș	28	10	5	13	42	50	−8	35	
12	Olimpia Râmnicu Sărat	28	10	4	14	36	43	−7	34	
13	Metalul Băicoi (R)	28	8	3	17	42	55	−13	27	Relegation to Divizia D
14	Proodeftiki Adjud (R)	28	5	2	21	24	108	−84	17	Relegation to Divizia D
15	CS Voluntari (Note: CS Voluntari withdrew at the beginning of second part of the championship and lost all the remaining matches with 0–3.) (R)	28	1	0	27	8	95	−87	3	Relegation to Divizia D
16	Ambianța Slobozia (Note: Ambianța Slobozia withdrew from championship after round 6 and all its results were canceled.) (R)	0	0	0	0	0	0	0	0	Withdrew

Source: rsssf.org
Rules for classification: 1) Points; 2) Goal difference; 3) Number of goals scored.
(C) Champions; (P) Promoted; (R) Relegated

==== Results ====
Home \ Away	URZ	POI	BRA	BRE	CON	BER	PET	BOL	TRA	DGL	PIE	RMS	BAI	ADJ	VOL	AMB
Unirea Urziceni		1–0	2–0	1–0	1–0	–	1–0	2–1	3–1	1–0	0–0	2–0	3–2	1–0	2–0	
Poiana Câmpina	0–1		–	3–0	2–1	4–1	–	2–1	4–1	2–1	4–2	4–2	5–0	3–0	3–0	
Chimia Brazi	0–0	1–1		1–0	1–0	0–0	0–0	3–1	–	3–2	2–0	–	4–1	11–1	3–0	
Tricolorul Breaza	1–1	0–0	2–0		1–0	0–0	2–1	–	3–1	2–0	3–2	4–1	3–2	6–2	–	
Conpet Ploiești	2–1	–	1–1	3–4		1–0	4–3	2–0	2–1	2–0	6–0	4–1	2–0	–	10–0	
Petrolul Berca	4–2	–	1–5	1–2	2–0		6–3	4–0	3–0	–	2–0	1–1	2–1	12–1	3–0	
Petrolul Brăila	3–1	0–3	1–4	4–2	1–0	2–0		–	–	1–2	3–2	2–0	2–1	3–1	3–0	
Petrolistul Boldești	0–1	1–1	1–3	0–0	3–0	3–0	1–2		2–0	3–1	–	3–1	1–0	1–0	5–1	
Tractorul Brașov	2–0	0–2	1–3	2–1	–	2–3	3–0	1–2		2–1	–	2–0	4–1	8–03–0 (Note: The match Tractorul Brașov − Proodeftiki Adjud (8–0) was awarded 0–3.)	9–0	
Dunărea Galați	–	0–0	–	3–0	0–0	1–2	2–0	1–1	0–1		0–1	–	3–1	2–0	3–0	
Turistul Pietroasa Haleș	0–3	1–13–0 (Note: The match Turistul Pietroasa Haleș − Poiana Câmpina (1–1) was awarded 3–0, as Ioan Chiția played while under suspension.)	2–1	0–0	2–1	3–2	2–6	0–1	1–1	1–1		3–1	–	–	3–1	
Olimpia Râmnicu Sărat	0–1	1–1	1–1	0–2	–	–	3–0	3–1	1–4	2–1	1–0		1–2	5–1	2–0	
Metalul Băicoi	0–2	1–5	2–3	–	2–1	0–0	1–1	1–2	1–1	3–1	3–03–0 (Note: The match Metalul Băicoi − Turistul Pietroasa Haleș (3–1) was homologated with 3–0, because the guests used a suspended player, Zaibert.)	1–2		5–0	–	
Proodeftiki Adjud	0–9	1–8	0–9	–	0–1	1–2	–	1–1	1–0	0–4	1–1	0–1	3–1		3–0	
CS Voluntari	–	0–2	0–4	1–3	0–3	0–3	2–0	0–3	0–3	0–3	0–3	0–3	1–4	2–3		
Ambianța Slobozia																

Source: rsssf.org
Legend: Blue = home team win; Yellow = draw; Red = away team win.

=== Series III ===
==== League table ====
Pos	Team	Pld	W	D	L	GF	GA	GD	Pts	Promotion or relegation
1	Juventus Colentina București (C, P)	30	21	4	5	66	22	+44	67	Promotion to Divizia B
2	Electrica Dobrogea Constanța (P)	30	19	4	7	59	35	+24	61	Promotion to Divizia B
3	Callatis Mangalia	30	18	5	7	62	21	+41	59	
4	Dunărea Giurgiu	30	17	3	10	54	32	+22	54	
5	Portul Constanța	30	15	3	12	51	32	+19	48	
6	Petrolul Bolintin-Vale	30	14	6	10	32	28	+4	48	
7	Aversa București	30	12	6	12	39	42	−3	42	
8	Otopeni	30	13	2	15	50	48	+2	41	
9	Oil Terminal Constanța	30	10	10	10	37	31	+6	40	
10	Dunărea Călărași	30	11	5	14	43	51	−8	38	
11	Snagov	30	11	4	15	33	48	−15	37	
12	Sportul Ciorogârla	30	9	9	12	29	38	−9	36	
13	Voința București (R)	30	9	5	16	32	67	−35	32	Relegation to Divizia D
14	Venus RGAB București (R)	30	10	9	11	40	44	−4	31 (Note: Venus RGAB București deducted 8 points.)	Relegation to Divizia D
15	Faur București (R)	30	8	2	20	38	76	−38	26	Relegation to Divizia D
16	Șantierul Naval Tulcea (Note: Șantierul Naval Tulcea withdrew at half season and lost all remaining matches with 0–3.) (R)	30	3	3	24	12	73	−61	12	Relegation to Divizia D

Source: rsssf.org
Rules for classification: 1) Points; 2) Goal difference; 3) Number of goals scored.
(C) Champions; (P) Promoted; (R) Relegated

==== Results ====
Home \ Away	JUV	DOB	CLL	GIU	POR	BOL	AVE	OTO	OIL	CLR	SNA	CIO	VOI	VEN	FAU	TUL
Juventus Colentina București		2–2	–	2–0	4–0	2–0	2–1	6–1	3–1	3–3	2–0	–	3–0	0–0	5–0	4–1
Electrica Dobrogea Constanța	1–0		1–2	5–1	1–0	0–0	2–0	–	2–1	2–0	5–2	2–0	3–0	2–0	–	3–0
Callatis Mangalia	1–0	4–1		1–0	2–1	3–0	13–1	4–1	1–0	1–1	–	0–0	–	1–1	5–1	2–0
Dunărea Giurgiu	1–2	3–1	3–0		2–1	2–1	0–0	1–4	1–0	2–0	5–2	2–1	7–0	1–1	–	–
Portul Constanța	2–0	0–1	1–2	–		3–1	2–0	3–1	3–2	3–0	–	2–1	8–0	2–0	4–1	2–0
Petrolul Bolintin-Vale	1–2	2–1	3–0	0–0	1–0		0–1	1–0	–	5–2	3–0 (Note: The match Petrolul Bolintin-Vale − Snagov (2–0) was awarded 3–0.)	0–0	0–3	–	5–0	3–0
Aversa București	2–3	–	0–3	–	1–0	0–0		1–2	2–2	3–1	0–1	3–0	1–0	0–0	4–3	2–0
Otopeni	–	4–0	1–0	1–2	4–1	0–1	0–1		1–0	6–1	1–3	2–1	0–6	–	6–0	3–0
Oil Terminal Constanța	2–1	1–3	0–0	2–0	–	1–0	1–1	2–0		1–0	–	3–1	3–0	1–1	4–1	0–0
Dunărea Călărași	0–0	1–2	1–0	0–2	0–3	1–1	–	2–1	2–1		2–1	–	2–0	4–1	3–2	7–1
Snagov	0–1	2–0	0–0	0–2	1–0	–	0–3	0–0	0–0	2–0		1–0	2–0	1–2	1–1	3–0
Sportul Ciorogârla	2–1	–	1–0	0–2	1–1	1–3	1–1	0–1	0–0	1–0	3–1		–	0–3 (Note: The match Sportul Ciorogârla − Venus București (1–1) was ruled 0–3.)	1–0	1–1
Voința București	2–3	2–2	1–0	1–0	0–0	–	1–0	–	1–1	0–3	3–1	2–2		1–0	1–1	3–0
Venus RGAB București	0–4	3–3	–	2–6	0–1	1–0	2–1	3–2	–	2–2	0–2	1–1	4–0		3–0	1–0
Faur București	–	1–2	0–2	2–1	3–2	1–3	1–5	0–2	2–1	–	3–1	1–2	1–2	3–1		3–0
Șantierul Naval Tulcea	0–3	2–2	0–3	0–2	–	0–1	–	1–0	0–3	–	4–1	0–3	2–0	0–3	0–3	

Source: rsssf.org
Legend: Blue = home team win; Yellow = draw; Red = away team win.

=== Series IV ===
==== League table ====
Pos	Team	Pld	W	D	L	GF	GA	GD	Pts	Promotion or relegation
1	Dacia Mioveni (C, P)	28	23	3	2	53	12	+41	72	Promotion to Divizia B
2	Chindia Târgoviște (P)	28	20	6	2	48	9	+39	66	Promotion to Divizia B
3	Progresul Caracal	28	17	4	7	58	26	+32	55	
4	Electro Craiova	28	15	7	6	46	26	+20	52	
5	Școala "Gică Popescu" Calafat	28	12	5	11	36	40	−4	41	
6	Flacăra Moreni	28	11	5	12	30	36	−6	38	
7	Armata Craiova	28	11	2	15	31	41	−10	35	
8	Turris Turnu Măgurele	28	11	2	15	31	41	−10	35	
9	Petrolul Videle	28	9	7	12	34	34	0	34	
10	Dunărea Zimnicea	28	10	4	14	42	56	−14	34	
11	Petrolul Steaua Târgoviște	28	9	5	14	23	40	−17	32	
12	Alpan U Târgoviște	28	9	5	14	29	32	−3	32	
13	Rova Roșiori (R)	28	5	9	14	19	45	−26	24	Relegation to Divizia D
14	Curtea de Argeș (R)	28	6	6	16	20	31	−11	24	Relegation to Divizia D
15	Petrolul Drăgășani (R)	28	6	2	20	21	66	−45	20	Relegation to Divizia D
16	Fulgerul Lerești (Note: Fulgerul Lerești was excluded from the league after a second forfeit and all its results were canceled.) (D)	0	0	0	0	0	0	0	0	Excluded

Source: rsssf.org
Rules for classification: 1) Points; 2) Goal difference; 3) Number of goals scored.
(C) Champions; (D) Disqualified; (P) Promoted; (R) Relegated

==== Results ====
Home \ Away	MIO	TAR	CAR	ELE	GP	MOR	ARM	TRM	VID	ZIM	PST	ALP	ROS	CRA	DRA	LER
Dacia Mioveni		–	2–0	1–0	3–1	2–1	2–0	–	2–0	5–1	6–0	1–0	1–0	2–0	3–0	
Chindia Târgoviște	2–0		1–1	1–0	4–0	1–0	–	4–0	3–2	5–0	4–0	2–0	4–0	2–0	3–0	
Progresul Caracal	3–2	0–0		2–1	3–0	0–2	5–1	4–2	3–0	10–1	0–0	–	–	2–1	5–0	
Electro Craiova	–	2–1	2–0		1–1	1–1	1–0	4–1	1–1	4–0	–	1–0	2–0	3–2	3–0	
Școala "Gică Popescu" Calafat	0–1	0–0	–	2–1		2–0	2–1	3–0	0–1	1–0	2–2	1–0	4–1	3–1	1–2	
Flacăra Moreni	–	0–1	0–3	3–1	1–5		3–1	1–0	2–1	1–0	1–2	2–1	0–0	–	2–0	
Armata Craiova	0–1	0–1	1–0	–	3–0	5–0		5–2	1–0	3–0	2–0	2–3	3–0	1–0	–	
Turris Turnu Măgurele	0–1	0–1	2–3	0–0	2–0	1–0	–		1–0	6–1	1–0	–	1–0	1–1	2–0	
Petrolul Videle	0–0	1–2	2–0	1–1	–	0–0	2–1	0–1		3–0	2–1	3–2	3–1	–	3–2	
Dunărea Zimnicea	1–1	0–0	1–0	2–4	0–1	–	2–0	2–0	–		3–0	2–0	5–0	2–1	9–0	
Petrolul Steaua Târgoviște	0–2	0–1	–	0–1	2–0	1–0	0–0	–	0–0	1–0		0–1	2–0	0–1	2–1	
Alpan U Târgoviște	0–1	1–1	0–1	2–0	1–1	1–1	1–0	1–0	3–1	4–1	2–3		–	1–0	–	
Rova Roșiori	1–3	0–0	2–1	1–1	–	1–1	1–0	2–1	–	1–1	2–2	0–0		2–0	0–0	
Curtea de Argeș	0–1	–	0–1	1–2	2–0	1–2	1–1	0–1	0–0	–	2–0	0–0	0–0		2–1	
Petrolul Drăgășani	0–1	0–2	1–4	0–2	–	3–0	3–2	2–0	3–1	1–1	–	1–0	3–1	0–2		
Fulgerul Lerești																

Source: rsssf.org
Legend: Blue = home team win; Yellow = draw; Red = away team win.

=== Series V ===
==== League table ====
Pos	Team	Pld	W	D	L	GF	GA	GD	Pts	Promotion or relegation
1	Rarora Râmnicu Vâlcea (C, P)	30	20	3	7	69	22	+47	63	Promotion to Divizia B
2	Minerul Motru (P)	30	19	5	6	60	29	+31	62	Promotion to Divizia B
3	Building Vânju Mare (P)	30	17	8	5	54	24	+30	59	Promotion to Divizia B
4	Dierna Orșova	30	15	4	11	50	36	+14	49	
5	Minerul Mătăsari	30	13	6	11	43	43	0	45	
6	Petrolul Stoina	30	13	5	12	58	42	+16	44	
7	Oltul Slatina	30	12	8	10	37	28	+9	44	
8	Oltchim Râmnicu Vâlcea	30	13	4	13	36	33	+3	43	
9	Senaco Novaci	30	13	3	14	47	44	+3	42	
10	Minerul Moldova Nouă	30	12	6	12	45	32	+13	42	
11	Minerul Lupeni	30	12	5	13	44	32	+12	41	
12	Severnav Drobeta-Turnu Severin	30	12	5	13	35	41	−6	41	
13	Petrolul Țicleni	30	10	4	16	31	61	−30	34	
14	Minerul Berbești (R)	30	10	4	16	24	47	−23	34	Relegation to Divizia D
15	Forestierul Stâlpeni (R)	30	8	2	20	22	78	−56	26	Relegation to Divizia D
16	Metalul Oțelu Roșu (R)	30	3	4	23	13	76	−63	13	Relegation to Divizia D

Source: rsssf.org
Rules for classification: 1) Points; 2) Goal difference; 3) Number of goals scored.
(C) Champions; (P) Promoted; (R) Relegated

==== Results ====
Home \ Away	RAR	MOT	VIN	ORS	MTS	STO	SLA	OLT	NOV	MOL	LUP	SEV	TIC	BER	STA	OTE
Rarora Râmnicu Vâlcea		2–1	1–0	4–1	3–1	5–0	4–0	4–0	2–3	4–0	1–0	3–1	5–0	4–0	3–0	4–0
Minerul Motru	1–0		1–1	2–0	3–0	4–0	1–0	2–0	2–1	1–1	1–0	2–0	6–0	4–1	4–0	3–0
Building Vânju Mare	2–1	3–1		2–0	1–1	1–1	1–0	3–0	4–1	1–0	1–0	2–0	4–1	3–0	4–0	5–0
Dierna Orșova	0–0	3–1	6–2		4–0	1–0	1–0	1–0	3–2	4–1	3–0	1–2	4–0	3–0	3–0	3–0
Minerul Mătăsari	2–1	0–0	0–0	1–0		3–1	3–0	2–0	3–1	1–0	1–1	4–0	4–0	3–0	3–0	2–0
Petrolul Stoina	1–2	5–3	0–0	5–1	5–3		3–0	1–2	4–0	5–1	2–0	1–0	4–0	4–0	5–0	3–0
Oltul Slatina	1–0	1–1	1–1	0–1	5–0	2–0		3–0	2–1	1–2	3–2	0–0	2–0	0–3 (Note: The match Oltul Slatina − Minerul Berbești (1–1) was ruled 0–3, as Oltul fielded Daniel Uță while under suspension.)	3–0	3–0
Oltchim Râmnicu Vâlcea	0–0	1–0	1–1	2–0	3–0	2–1	0–0		0–3	0–3	3–0	4–0	2–0	3–0	3–0	4–0
Senaco Novaci	2–4	1–4	2–3	5–1	2–0	1–0	1–1	0–0		1–0	1–0	0–1	1–0	1–0	6–0	2–0
Minerul Moldova Nouă	3–0	0–1	2–2	1–1	4–0	1–0	0–1	1–0	0–0		0–0	0–0	5–2	3–0	2–0	3–0
Minerul Lupeni	0–0	6–2	1–0	2–0	3–0	1–1	1–0	2–0	3–0	2–1		3–0	6–1	0–0	3–0	6–1
Severnav Drobeta-Turnu Severin	0–2	0–1	0–1	1–1	1–0	4–2	1–1	2–1	2–1	1–2	3–1		2–2	2–1	2–0	3–0
Petrolul Țicleni	0–1	1–2	0–2	0–0	4–2	1–1	0–1	2–1	1–0	1–0	1–0	4–2		1–0	2–0	3–0
Minerul Berbești	3–2	1–3	1–0	1–0	0–0	1–1	1–0	0–1	3–2	1–0	1–0	0–2	0–1		4–0	1–0
Forestierul Stâlpeni	0–4	0–2	2–1	1–4	1–1	2–0	1–4	2–0	1–4	0–8	2–1	1–0	2–1	3–0		3–0
Metalul Oțelu Roșu	0–3	1–1	0–3	1–0	0–3	1–2	0–3 (Note: The match Metalul Oțelu Roșu − Oltul Slatina (1–1) was awarded 0–3.)	0–3	0–2	2–1	3–0	0–3	2–2	0–3	1–1	

Source: rsssf.org
Legend: Blue = home team win; Yellow = draw; Red = away team win.

=== Series VI ===
==== League table ====
Pos	Team	Pld	W	D	L	GF	GA	GD	Pts	Promotion or relegation
1	Jiul Petroșani (C, P)	30	23	1	6	81	33	+48	70	Promotion to Divizia B
2	Certej (P)	30	21	4	5	85	29	+56	67	Promotion to Divizia B
3	ACU Arad (P)	30	21	4	5	62	23	+39	67	Promotion to Divizia B
4	Cugir 1939	30	13	7	10	44	36	+8	46	
5	Aurul Brad	30	12	8	10	40	37	+3	44	
6	Mureșul Deva	30	13	4	13	52	35	+17	43	
7	Dacia Orăștie	30	12	5	13	42	53	−11	41	
8	Telecom Arad	30	12	4	14	48	52	−4	40	
9	Vulcan	30	11	6	13	34	36	−2	39	
10	Electrica Timișoara (Note: Electrica Timișoara was automatically relegated after two suspensions (rounds 28 and 30) for financial problems.) (R)	30	11	6	13	35	41	−6	39	Relegation to Divizia D
11	West Petrom Pecica	30	11	6	13	36	48	−12	39	
12	Inter Petrila	30	11	5	14	45	47	−2	38	
13	CFR Marmosim Simeria	30	10	6	14	42	41	+1	36	
14	Cuprirom Abrud	30	10	6	14	37	55	−18	36	
15	Minerul Uricani (R)	30	8	2	20	33	64	−31	26	Relegation to Divizia D
16	Rapid CFR Teiuș (R)	30	3	2	25	23	109	−86	11	Relegation to Divizia D

Source: rsssf.org
Rules for classification: 1) Points; 2) Goal difference; 3) Number of goals scored.
(C) Champions; (P) Promoted; (R) Relegated

==== Results ====
Home \ Away	JIU	CER	ACU	CUG	BRA	DEV	ORA	TEL	WES	VUL	ELE	PET	SIM	ABR	URI	TEI
Jiul Petroșani		3–1	5–1	0–1	3–1	3–2	2–1	3–0	5–0	3–0	3–0	5–2	3–0	6–0	5–0	3–1
Certej	4–2		3–1	6–2	2–0	2–1	4–0	4–3	3–1	5–1	1–0	7–2	2–1	3–0	5–2	15–1
ACU Arad	1–0	1–0		5–0	4–0	2–0	1–1	1–1	2–0	3–0	1–0	2–0	4–1	4–0	4–0	5–1
Cugir 1939	1–1	0–0	1–0		1–1	3–0	7–0	3–0	1–2	2–0	3–0	2–1	4–0	3–0	2–0	3–0
Aurul Brad	1–4	0–1	2–1	1–1		0–0	1–0	4–0	0–1	1–1	3–1	3–1	0–0	3–2	2–0	3–0
Mureșul Deva	3–1	0–2	1–2	1–1	5–2		5–0	3–0	1–2	1–1	3–0	2–1	2–0	3–0	4–0	3–0
Dacia Orăștie	3–1	0–3	2–2	1–0	1–3	1–0		0–2	3–0	2–1	1–0	2–2	2–1	4–0	2–1	3–0 (Note: The match Dacia Orăștie − CFR Teiuș (6–1) was ruled 3–0.)
Telecom Arad	1–3	0–3	0–2	3–0	0–0	3–1	4–1		0–1	1–0	0–1	2–1	1–1	4–0	1–1	4–0
West Petrom Pecica	1–3	3–1	1–2	1–1	0–0	0–6	1–0	1–2		0–2	1–1	4–1	2–1	2–1	0–1	3–0
Vulcan	0–1	1–1	1–0	3–0	0–1	1–2	4–0	5–0	1–1		0–0	1–0	2–0	3–0	2–0	3–0
Electrica Timișoara	5–1	1–1	1–3	4–0	1–0	3–0	0–3	2–1	1–4	1–0		2–0	2–1	0–1	2–1	3–0
Inter Petrila	0–1	0–0	1–2	1–0	2–1	0–0	2–0	4–1	3–2	3–0	0–0		3–0	3–0	4–0	2–0
CFR Marmosim Simeria	1–3	1–0	0–1	2–0	0–0	1–0	1–1	3–2	1–1	5–0	0–0	4–1		2–1	4–0	8–1
Cuprirom Abrud	0–1	2–1	1–1	1–1	2–1	2–0	1–1	2–4	2–0	0–0	2–1	1–1	1–0		2–0	2–2
Minerul Uricani	2–4	0–2	0–1	2–0	2–4	2–1	3–1	0–2	0–0	0–1	4–0	3–1	2–0	1–4		3–0
Rapid CFR Teiuș	0–3	0–3	0–3	0–1	1–2	0–2	0–3	2–6	3–1	3–0	3–3	0–3	0–3	0–7	4–3	

Source: rsssf.com
Legend: Blue = home team win; Yellow = draw; Red = away team win.

=== Series VII ===
==== League table ====
Pos	Team	Pld	W	D	L	GF	GA	GD	Pts	Promotion or relegation
1	Oltul Sfântu Gheorghe (C, P)	30	19	4	7	58	24	+34	61	Promotion to Divizia B
2	Precizia Săcele (P)	30	18	7	5	54	24	+30	61	Promotion to Divizia B
3	Predeal	30	15	3	12	39	29	+10	48	
4	AMSO Sibiu	30	14	5	11	44	36	+8	47	
5	Gaz Metan Târgu Mureș	30	13	7	10	44	33	+11	46	
6	Chimica Târnăveni	30	11	11	8	29	25	+4	44	
7	Romradiatoare Brașov	30	13	4	13	40	40	0	43	
8	Unirea Ungheni	30	12	6	12	39	44	−5	42	
9	Viromet Victoria	30	12	5	13	32	40	−8	41	
10	Nitramonia Făgăraș	30	12	4	14	38	33	+5	40	
11	Budvar Odorheiul Secuiesc	30	11	6	13	38	34	+4	39	
12	Avântul Silva Reghin	30	10	9	11	42	32	+10	39	
13	Torpedo Zărnești	30	11	5	14	29	39	−10	38	
14	ASA Târgu Mureș (R)	30	9	9	12	34	38	−4	36	Relegation to Divizia D
15	Energia Feldioara (R)	30	8	7	15	24	45	−21	31	Relegation to Divizia D
16	Textila Cisnădie (Note: Textila Cisnădie withdrew during the winter break and lost all matches from the second half of the season with 0–3.) (R)	30	4	4	22	13	70	−57	16	Relegation to Divizia D

Source: rsssf.org
Rules for classification: 1) Points; 2) Goal difference; 3) Number of goals scored.
(C) Champions; (P) Promoted; (R) Relegated

==== Results ====
Home \ Away	SF	SAC	PRE	SIB	GAZ	TAR	ROM	UNG	VIC	NIT	ODO	REG	ZAR	ASA	FEL	CIS
Oltul Sfântu Gheorghe		1–0	1–0	5–0	1–0	5–0	3–1	2–0	6–0	5–3	0–0	2–0	–	4–0	1–0	–
Precizia Săcele	1–3		3–0	1–0	1–1	0–0	–	–	1–0	3–0	3–1	1–0	2–0	5–2	7–0	3–0
Predeal	–	1–1		1–0	–	0–2	1–0	2–1	4–1	3–0	1–1	2–1	0–2	3–1	1–0	3–0
AMSO Sibiu	2–1	2–4	2–0		2–1	2–0	0–0	4–0	–	4–1	–	3–0	0–0	–	0–0	1–1
Gaz Metan Târgu Mureș	1–2	3–0	1–0	2–1		2–0	3–1	4–2	3–0	1–0	2–1	2–0	1–1	–	1–1	–
Chimica Târnăveni	1–0	1–2	2–2	–	2–2		1–1	–	0–1	0–0	2–1	3–0	2–0	1–0	3–0	3–0
Romradiatoare Brașov	3–2	1–3	–	3–1	1–0	1–1		3–2	1–3	–	0–0	1–3	1–0	1–0	4–1	2–0
Unirea Ungheni	1–0	0–1	2–1	1–2	1–3	0–0	2–0		2–0	–	–	2–1	2–1	3–3	3–0	2–2
Viromet Victoria	0–1	–	1–0	1–0	2–0	–	2–3	0–0		2–0	2–1	1–1	1–0	1–0	1–2	3–0
Nitramonia Făgăraș	–	2–0	3–1	1–0	1–0	1–0	1–0	6–1	0–0		0–1	1–1	2–0	6–1	–	3–0 (Note: The match Nitramonia Făgăraș − Textila Cisnădie was awarded 3–0.)
Budvar Odorheiul Secuiesc	1–0	1–1	0–1	0–2	3–1	0–0	2–3	0–1	–	1–0		2–0	4–1	3–1	–	3–1
Avântul Silva Reghin	1–1	0–0	–	3–1	–	1–1	1–0	1–1	2–2	2–0	2–1		4–0	1–2	6–0	6–1
Torpedo Zărnești	0–1	0–4	1–3	3–1	1–1	2–0	–	3–0	1–2	1–0	2–0	–		1–1	3–1	3–0
ASA Târgu Mureș	1–1	1–0	1–0	0–1	2–2	–	2–1	0–2	0–2	2–1	1–0	0–0	0–0		0–1	–
Energia Feldioara	0–1	–	1–0	2–3	0–1	0–1	1–0	3–2	2–1	0–0	0–0	0–0	–	2–2		3–0
Textila Cisnădie	2–2	0–1	0–3	0–3	1–0	0–0	0–3	0–3	1–0	0–3	0–3	–	2–0	1–2	1–0	

Source: rsssf.org
Legend: Blue = home team win; Yellow = draw; Red = away team win.

=== Series VIII ===
==== League table ====
Pos	Team	Pld	W	D	L	GF	GA	GD	Pts	Promotion or relegation
1	Armătura Zalău (C, P)	28	22	2	4	83	17	+66	68	Promotion to Divizia B
2	Tricotaje Ineu (P)	28	20	5	3	63	23	+40	65	Promotion to Divizia B
3	Oașul Negrești-Oaș (P)	28	20	4	4	51	20	+31	64	Promotion to Divizia B
4	Dej	28	15	4	9	42	25	+17	49	
5	Unirea Dej	28	15	4	9	44	25	+19	49	
6	Minerul Sărmășag	28	15	1	12	46	38	+8	46	
7	Someș Gaz Beclean	28	13	4	11	47	39	+8	43	
8	Victoria Carei	28	12	3	13	32	37	−5	39	
9	Arieșul Turda	28	11	4	13	40	46	−6	37	
10	Frontiera Curtici	28	10	6	12	40	40	0	36	
11	Someșul Satu Mare	28	11	1	16	30	44	−14	34	
12	Olimpia Gherla	28	7	8	13	31	37	−6	29	
13	Petrom Marghita (R)	28	7	6	15	31	54	−23	27	Relegation to Divizia D
14	Plastunion Satulung (R)	28	2	4	22	19	88	−69	10	Relegation to Divizia D
15	Marmația Sighetu Marmației (Note: Marmația Sighetu Marmației withdrew during the winter break and lost all matches from the second half of the season with 0–3.) (R)	28	1	2	25	11	77	−66	5	Relegation to Divizia D
16	Crișul Aleșd (Note: Crișul Aleșd withdrew before the start of the championship.) (D)	0	0	0	0	0	0	0	0	Withdrew

Source: rsssf.org
Rules for classification: 1) Points; 2) Goal difference; 3) Number of goals scored.
(C) Champions; (D) Disqualified; (P) Promoted; (R) Relegated

==== Results ====
Home \ Away	ZAL	INE	OAS	CFD	UDJ	SAR	BEC	CAR	TUR	CUR	SSM	GHE	MAR	SAT	SIG
Armătura Zalău		5–0	4–0	1–0	3–1	3–0	7–1	5–0	4–1	4–0	4–0	4–0	5–0	6–0	4–0
Tricotaje Ineu	3–1		3–3	4–0	1–0	2–0	4–0	4–0	1–0	2–0	4–0	3–2	4–2	5–1	3–0
Oașul Negrești-Oaș	1–0	0–0		1–0	1–0	6–0	2–1	4–1	3–0	3–0	2–0	3–0	4–1	3–1	2–0
CF Dej	0–1	2–0	2–0		0–0	0–0	1–0	2–0	1–1	2–0	0–1	1–0	3–0	4–0	3–0
Unirea Dej	2–1	0–1	4–0	0–2		1–0	3–2	2–0	3–0	2–1	1–0	3–1	1–1	8–0	3–0
Minerul Sărmășag	3–1	1–3	0–2	1–2	2–1		2–0	1–0	5–1	5–1	0–1	3–0	3–0	3–1	3–0
Someș Gaz Beclean	1–1	0–2	2–1	2–1	3–0	3–1		2–0	2–3	2–0	4–1	2–1	6–0	2–0	3–0
Victoria Carei	0–2	0–0	0–0	4–1	1–0	2–0	1–0		1–1	2–0	5–2	2–1	1–0	2–0	3–1
Arieșul Turda	2–3	4–3	0–1	4–2	0–1	0–2	2–0	1–0		1–1	2–0	1–0	1–3	5–0	3–0
Frontiera Curtici	1–4	0–0	0–0	2–0	3–2	2–0	1–1	2–0	0–1		4–2	1–0	4–0	8–0	3–0
Someșul Satu Mare	0–1	0–1	0–1	0–4	0–1	1–2	2–0	2–0	2–0	1–0		0–0	4–2	4–1	2–1
Olimpia Gherla	0–1	2–2	1–2	0–0	1–1	3–0	2–2	2–0	0–0	2–1	2–0		1–0	4–1	3–0
Petrom Marghita	1–1	0–1	0–1	3–4	0–2	0–1	0–0	2–1	2–1	2–2	2–1	1–1		2–0	4–1
Plastunion Satulung	0–4	0–4	0–2	0–2	1–1	1–5	0–3	0–3	5–2	1–2	0–1	1–1	0–0		2–2
Marmația Sighetu Marmației	0–3	0–3	0–3	0–3	0–1	1–3	1–3	0–3	1–3	1–1	0–3	2–1	0–3	0–3	

Source: rsssf.org
Legend: Blue = home team win; Yellow = draw; Red = away team win.

== See also ==
- 2002–03 Divizia A
- 2002–03 Divizia B
- 2002–03 Divizia D
- 2002–03 Cupa României
