= Cornel Mihart =

Romanian footballer

Personal information
- Date of birth: 25 September 1974 (age 52)
- Place of birth: Drobeta-Turnu Severin, Romania
- Height: 1.83 m (6 ft 0 in)
- Position: Defender

Youth career
- Drobeta-Turnu Severin

Senior career*
Years	Team	Apps	(Gls)
1994–1996	Drobeta-Turnu Severin		
1996–1999	Dinamo București	4	(0)
1997–1998	→ Inter Sibiu (loan)	38	(2)
1998–1999	→ ARO Câmpulung (loan)	30	(9)
1999–2003	Astra Ploiești	95	(8)
2002	→ Metalul Plopeni (loan)	1	(0)
2003–2004	Petrolul Ploiești	37	(4)
2005–2007	Jiul Petroșani	62	(1)
2007–2010	Minerul Mehedinți		
Total		267	(24)

Managerial career
- 2007–2009: Minerul Mehedinți
- 2010–2011: Drobeta-Turnu Severin (assistant)
- 2010–: Sport Kids Drobeta (youth)
- * Club domestic league appearances and goals as of 31 October 2018

Cornel Mihart (born 25 September 1974) is a Romanian former professional footballer who played as a defender. In his career Mihart played 176 Liga I matches for important Romanian clubs such as: Dinamo București, Astra Ploiești, Petrolul Ploiești and Jiul Petroșani. In 2010 Cornel Mihart founded a football school named Sport Kids Drobeta, being the owner and one of the school's coaches.

== Personal life ==
His son, Ianis, is also a footballer.

== Honours ==
Jiul Petroșani

- Divizia B: 2004–05
