= Flavius Stoican =

Romanian footballer (born 1976)

Personal information
- Full name: Flavius Vladimir Stoican
- Date of birth: 24 November 1976 (age 49)
- Place of birth: Vânju Mare, Romania
- Height: 1.80 m (5 ft 11 in)
- Position: Right-back

Team information
- Current team: CS Drobeta-Turnu Severin (head coach)

Youth career
- –1994: Drobeta-Turnu Severin

Senior career*
Years	Team	Apps	(Gls)
1994–1995	Drobeta-Turnu Severin		
1995–2002	Universitatea Craiova	101	(2)
2002–2003	Dinamo București	29	(1)
2003–2006	Shakhtar Donetsk	48	(1)
2007	Metalist Kharkiv	1	(0)
2007–2008	Dinamo București	7	(0)
2009–2010	Minerul Mehedinți		
Total		186	(4)

International career
1999–2005	Romania	19	(0)

Managerial career
- 2009–2010: Minerul Mehedinți (player/coach)
- 2010–2011: CSMȘ Reșița
- 2011–2012: Dinamo II București
- 2012: Chindia Târgoviște
- 2012–2013: Mioveni
- 2013: Dinamo II București
- 2013–2014: Dinamo București
- 2015: Dinamo București
- 2015: Voluntari
- 2016: Zimbru Chișinău
- 2017: Pandurii Târgu Jiu
- 2017–2019: Politehnica Iași
- 2019: Petrolul Ploiești
- 2020–2021: Viitorul Târgu Jiu
- 2021: FC U Craiova
- 2021–2022: Dinamo București
- 2022: Mioveni
- 2022–2023: Botoșani
- 2023–2026: CSM Reșița
- 2026: Farul Constanța
- 2026–: CS Drobeta-Turnu Severin
- * Club domestic league appearances and goals

Flavius Vladimir Stoican (born 24 November 1976) is a Romanian professional football manager and former player, currently in charge of Liga III club CS Drobeta-Turnu Severin.

== Club career ==
Stoican started his career at FC Drobeta, but soon he left them for Universitatea Craviova, where he played for seven years. In the summer of 2002, Stoican moved to Romanian giants Dinamo București.

While playing for Dinamo, Shakhtar Donetsk manager, Mircea Lucescu, spotted Stoican's abilities and brought him to the Ukrainian Premier League club in the summer of 2003. He spent four years at Shakhtar Donetsk before moving to Metalist Kharkiv. He did not manage to find a place in the first team at Metalist and returned to Dinamo București for the final year of his playing career.

== International career ==
From 1999 to 2005, Stoican made 19 appearances for Romania, making his debut under coach Victor Pițurcă when he came as a substitute and replaced Dan Petrescu in a friendly against Cyprus which ended 2–2. He played two games at the Euro 2004 qualifiers and six at the 2006 World Cup qualifiers. Stoican's last game for the national team was a friendly against Nigeria which ended with a 3–0 victory.

== Managerial career ==
In 2009, after ending his player career, Stoican was appointed manager of Liga III club Minerul Valea Copcii. For the 2010–11 season he moved to CSM Reșița, and in July 2011 he was appointed head coach of Dinamo II București. After only six months, he resigned from Dinamo II and took control of Chindia Târgoviște. He left Chindia in September 2012, after a poor series of results. In October 2012, Stoican became head coach at Mioveni, with the primary objective of helping the team gain promotion to Liga I.

=== Dinamo ===
In August 2013, he came back to Dinamo II, now playing in the Liga III, with the objective of gaining promotion to Liga II. On 22 September 2013, Stoican was appointed as head coach at the main squad of FC Dinamo București. His contract was terminated by mutual agreement on 12 November 2014, when the club was placed sixth in Liga I and was eliminated from the Romanian Cup. From March to May 2015, Stoican had another brief spell in charge of Dinamo.

=== Politehnica Iași ===
In the summer of 2017, after his ambitious stint at Pandurii Târgu Jiu almost saved them from relegation to Liga II, Stoican was appointed head coach at Politehnica Iași. On 24 February 2018, in spite of a 0–1 loss to defending champions Viitorul Constanța, Stoican led Politehnica Iași to its first Liga I Championship play-off and to an eventual sixth-place finish at the end of the season.

=== Mioveni ===
On 24 August 2022, Stoican was appointed head coach at Mioveni on a one-year contract. His contract was terminated by mutual agreement on 1 November 2022.

== Personal life ==
His daughter Lorena is a professional handball player, who plays for SCM Craiova.

== Playing statistics ==
Appearances and goals by national team and year
National team	Year	Apps	Goals
Romania
Romania	1999	1	0
Romania	2002	2	0
Romania	2003	5	0
Romania	2004	8	0
Romania	2005	3	0
Total		19	0

== Managerial statistics ==
As of 31 May 2026

Managerial record by team and tenure
Team	From	To	Record				
Team	From	To	G	W	D	L	Win %
Minerul Mehedinți	6 April 2009	27 May 2010	37	18	13	6	48.65
CSMȘ Reșița	1 July 2010	29 March 2011	18	4	5	9	22.22
Dinamo II București	13 July 2011	3 January 2012	17	5	7	5	29.41
Chindia Târgoviște	9 January 2012	4 September 2012	17	5	5	7	29.41
Mioveni	1 October 2012	12 May 2013	18	6	7	5	33.33
Dinamo II București	23 August 2013	23 September 2013	4	3	1	0	75.00
Dinamo București	23 September 2013	12 November 2014	48	26	11	11	54.17
Dinamo București	12 March 2015	6 May 2015	10	2	3	5	20.00
Voluntari	14 August 2015	24 September 2015	7	0	1	6	0.00
Zimbru Chișinău	10 May 2016	22 September 2016	14	6	3	5	42.86
Pandurii Târgu Jiu	11 January 2017	8 June 2017	19	4	6	9	21.05
Politehnica Iași	9 June 2017	29 May 2019	80	28	16	36	35.00
Petrolul Ploiesti	24 June 2019	11 December 2019	24	12	7	5	50.00
Viitorul Târgu Jiu	28 August 2020	30 March 2021	25	15	3	7	60.00
FC U Craiova	26 October 2021	3 November 2021	4	1	1	2	25.00
Dinamo București	22 December 2021	9 March 2022	8	1	2	5	12.50
Mioveni	24 August 2022	1 November 2022	10	3	2	5	30.00
Botoșani	10 December 2022	21 May 2023	20	7	6	7	35.00
CSM Reșița	22 August 2023	9 March 2026	79	38	19	22	48.10
Farul Constanța	13 April 2026	2 June 2026	7	0	4	3	0.00
CS Drobeta-Turnu Severin	16 July 2026	present	0	0	0	0	—
Total			466	184	122	160	39.48

== Honours ==
=== Player ===
Universitatea Craiova

- Cupa României runner-up: 1997–98, 1999–00

Dinamo București

- Cupa României: 2002–03
- Supercupa României runner-up: 2002

Shakhtar Donetsk

- Ukrainian Premier League: 2004–05, 2005–06
- Ukrainian Cup: 2003–04
- Ukrainian Super Cup: 2005
