= 2003–04 Divizia B =

Divizia B
- Season: 2003–04
- Country: Romania
- Teams: 48 (3x16)
- Promoted: Politehnica Iași; Sportul Studențesc; CFR Cluj
- Relegated: Poiana Câmpina; Oltul Sfântu Gheorghe; Onești; Rarora Râmnicu Vâlcea; Cimentul Fieni; ARO Câmpulung; Reșița; Baia Mare; Minaur Zlatna
- Top goalscorer: Viorel Gheorghe (Series I, 13 goals); Gigel Bucur (Series II, 29 goals); Gabriel Apetri (Series III, 17 goals)

The 2003–04 Divizia B was the 64th season of the second tier of the Romanian football league system.

The format has been changed from two series of 16 teams to three series, each of them consisting of 16 teams. At the end of the season, the winners of the series promoted to Divizia A and the last three places from all the series relegated to Divizia C.

== Team changes ==
=== To Divizia B ===
Relegated from Divizia A

- Sportul Studențesc București
- UTA Arad

Promoted from Divizia C

- Petrolul Moinești
- Laminorul Roman
- Vaslui
- Unirea Urziceni
- Poiana Câmpina
- Juventus București
- Electrica Constanța
- Callatis Mangalia
- Dacia Mioveni
- Chindia Târgoviște
- Rarora Râmnicu Vâlcea
- Minerul Motru
- Building Vânju Mare
- Jiul Petroșani
- Certej
- ACU Arad
- Oltul Sfântu Gheorghe
- Precizia Săcele
- Armătura Zalău
- Tricotaje Ineu
- Oașul Negrești-Oaș

=== From Divizia B ===
Promoted to Divizia A

- Petrolul Ploiești
- Apulum Alba Iulia
- Oradea

Relegated to Divizia C

- Bucovina Suceava
- Gilortul Târgu Cărbunești
- Foresta Fălticeni
- UM Timișoara

=== Other changes ===
- Divizia A clubs and bitter rivals, Petrolul Ploiești and Astra Ploiești merged. Astra was absorbed by Petrolul and Oțelul Galați, which initially relegated after the promotion/relegation play-off against FC Oradea, remained in the top-flight.
- Chindia Târgoviște was renamed FCM Târgoviște.
- CS Certej merged with Mureșul Deva, was moved from Certeju de Sus to Deva and renamed CS Deva.
- Extensiv Craiova was renamed FC Craiova

== League tables ==
=== Series I ===
Pos	Team	Pld	W	D	L	GF	GA	GD	Pts	Qualification
1	Politehnica Iași (C, P)	30	21	7	2	61	20	+41	70	Promotion to Divizia A
2	Vaslui	30	18	4	8	52	21	+31	58	
3	Dacia Unirea Brăila	30	15	6	9	47	34	+13	51	
4	Petrolul Moinești	30	15	4	11	43	34	+9	49	
5	Laminorul Roman	30	14	4	12	39	35	+4	46	
6	Metalul Plopeni	30	13	6	11	35	36	−1	45	
7	Midia Năvodari	30	13	6	11	39	37	+2	45	
8	Unirea Focșani	30	11	7	12	40	34	+6	40	
9	Callatis Mangalia	30	11	6	13	30	33	−3	39	
10	Electrica Constanța	30	10	9	11	25	30	−5	39	
11	Precizia Săcele	30	10	7	13	21	28	−7	37	
12	Medgidia	30	10	7	13	32	34	−2	37	
13	Gloria Buzău	30	10	5	15	33	44	−11	35	
14	Poiana Câmpina (R)	30	9	5	16	35	44	−9	29 (Note: Poiana Câmpina were deducted 3 points.)	Relegation to Divizia C
15	Oltul Sfântu Gheorghe (R)	30	8	4	18	26	49	−23	28	Relegation to Divizia C
16	Onești (Note: Onești withdrew during the winter break and lost all the matches from the second part of the season by forfeit.) (R)	30	6	5	19	22	67	−45	23	Relegation to Divizia C

Source: romaniansoccer.ro (in Romanian)
Rules for classification: 1) Points; 2) Head-to-head points; 3) Head-to-head goal difference; 4) Head-to-head goals scored; 5) Head-to-head away goals scored; 6) Goal difference; 7) Goals scored.
(C) Champions; (P) Promoted; (R) Relegated

==== Top scorers ====
Rank	Player	Team	Goals
1	(Romania) Viorel Gheorghe	Petrolul Moinești	13
2	(Romania) Florin Anghel	Vaslui	12
2	(Romania) Valentin Badea	Vaslui	12
4	(Romania) Marius Păcurar	Politehnica Iași	8
5	(Romania) Constantin Borza	Midia Năvodari	7

=== Series II ===
Pos	Team	Pld	W	D	L	GF	GA	GD	Pts	Qualification
1	Sportul Studențesc București (C, P)	30	23	5	2	92	15	+77	74	Promotion to Divizia A
2	Pandurii Târgu Jiu	30	20	5	5	51	22	+29	65	
3	Dacia Mioveni	30	16	7	7	43	22	+21	55	
4	Inter Gaz București	30	13	9	8	42	31	+11	48	
5	Juventus București	30	12	11	7	27	26	+1	47	
6	Unirea Urziceni	30	12	8	10	30	23	+7	44	
7	Târgoviște	30	10	8	12	30	33	−3	38	
8	Internațional Pitești	30	10	8	12	31	37	−6	38	
9	Craiova	30	11	4	15	22	36	−14	37	
10	Minerul Motru	30	9	9	12	38	41	−3	36	
11	Rulmentul Alexandria	30	9	7	14	27	49	−22	34	
12	Building Vânju Mare	30	7	13	10	37	33	+4	34	
13	Electromagnetica București	30	9	5	16	29	48	−19	32	Ineligible for promotion
14	Rarora Râmnicu Vâlcea (R)	30	8	7	15	25	60	−35	31	Relegation to Divizia C
15	Cimentul Fieni (R)	30	9	3	18	24	40	−16	30	Relegation to Divizia C
16	ARO Câmpulung (R)	30	5	5	20	21	53	−32	20	Relegation to Divizia C

Source: romaniansoccer.ro (in Romanian)
Rules for classification: 1) Points; 2) Head-to-head points; 3) Head-to-head goal difference; 4) Head-to-head goals scored; 5) Head-to-head away goals scored; 6) Goal difference; 7) Goals scored.
(C) Champions; (P) Promoted; (R) Relegated

==== Top scorers ====
Rank	Player	Team	Goals
1	(Romania) Gheorghe Bucur	Sportul Studențesc	29
2	(Romania) Ionuț Mazilu	Sportul Studențesc	20
3	(Romania) Iulian Ștefan	Pandurii Târgu Jiu	9
3	(Romania) Florin Maxim	Sportul Studențesc	9
5	(Romania) Constantin Barbu	Dacia Mioveni	8
5	(Romania) Tiberiu Bălan	Sportul Studențesc	7
5	(Romania) Gigel Ene	Rulmentul Alexandria	7

=== Series III ===
Pos	Team	Pld	W	D	L	GF	GA	GD	Pts	Qualification
1	CFR Cluj (C, P)	30	21	6	3	75	19	+56	69	Promotion to Divizia A
2	Jiul Petroșani	30	21	5	4	67	17	+50	68	
3	Olimpia Satu Mare	30	21	4	5	50	12	+38	67	
4	Gaz Metan Mediaș	30	15	8	7	42	23	+19	53	
5	UTA Arad	30	16	5	9	44	35	+9	53	
6	Universitatea Cluj	30	15	7	8	49	28	+21	52	
7	Armătura Zalău	30	13	6	11	44	38	+6	45	
8	Oașul Negrești-Oaș	30	13	2	15	49	54	−5	41	
9	Tricotaje Ineu	30	13	2	15	57	53	+4	41	
10	Deva	30	12	3	15	46	41	+5	39	
11	IS Câmpia Turzii	30	10	9	11	35	41	−6	39	
12	Corvinul Hunedoara	30	11	3	16	41	59	−18	36	
13	ACU Arad	30	9	7	14	28	38	−10	34	
14	Reșița (R)	30	8	3	19	27	59	−32	27	Relegation to Divizia C
15	Baia Mare (R)	30	4	3	23	30	86	−56	15	Relegation to Divizia C
16	Minaur Zlatna (Note: Minaur Zlatna was excluded after round 27 and lost all remained matches from the second part by forfeit.) (R)	30	1	1	28	13	94	−81	4	Relegation to Divizia C

Source: romaniansoccer.ro (in Romanian)
Rules for classification: 1) Points; 2) Head-to-head points; 3) Head-to-head goal difference; 4) Head-to-head goals scored; 5) Head-to-head away goals scored; 6) Goal difference; 7) Goals scored.
(C) Champions; (P) Promoted; (R) Relegated

==== Results ====
Home \ Away	CFR	JIU	OLI	GAZ	UTA	UCJ	ARM	OAS	TRI	DEV	ISCT	COR	ACU	REȘ	BMA	ZLA
CFR Cluj		2–1	1–2	1–0	4–0	1–0	2–1	1–1	5–1	3–0	3–0	2–4	1–0	4–0	1–0	10–0
Jiul Petroșani	0–0		1–0	0–0	1–0	1–1	2–0	7–0	3–0	3–0	3–2	4–0	3–1	6–0	6–0	3–0
Olimpia Satu Mare	1–2	2–1		1–0	0–0	3–0	5–1	3–0	2–0	1–0	2–0	3–0	1–0	3–0	3–1	4–0
Gaz Metan Mediaș	2–2	0–2	0–0		0–0	2–2	0–0	2–0	3–0	1–0	3–1	5–1	2–0	1–0	4–2	3–0
UTA Arad	0–4	0–0	1–0	1–1		3–1	2–0	4–1	1–0	2–1	2–0	3–0	1–2	1–0	0–0	2–0
Universitatea Cluj	0–2	1–0	0–1	2–0	3–0		2–0	3–0	2–0	2–2	2–0	3–2	1–0	5–0	4–0	3–0
Armătura Zalău	0–0	2–2	0–3	1–0	3–1	0–2		0–0	3–1	1–0	1–1	2–1	0–0	2–0	7–1	2–0
Oașul Negrești-Oaș	0–1	1–4	0–1	1–2	4–2	3–2	2–1		4–2	2–1	2–4	2–0	3–0	3–0	3–3	5–2
Tricotaje Ineu	2–4	1–2	2–1	2–1	3–4	0–0	1–2	2–1		4–1	5–0	5–1	4–1	5–2	4–1	3–2
Deva	1–0	1–0	0–1	1–2	1–4	2–2	4–1	3–1	2–0		1–1	2–0	5–0	0–1	3–2	6–0
IS Câmpia Turzii	1–1	0–1	1–1	1–1	1–0	1–0	0–2	2–1	1–0	1–0		3–0	0–0	0–1	2–1	2–2
Corvinul Hunedoara	0–4	1–2	1–0	0–1	2–0	1–1	1–0	0–3	2–1	2–0	2–2		1–0	1–1	7–2	4–2
ACU Arad	1–1	1–2	0–0	1–0	1–2	2–2	1–1	1–0	0–0	0–2	2–0	1–3		3–0	2–0	3–0
Reșița	1–3	0–2	0–1	0–1	2–4	0–2	4–2	0–1	1–2	2–0	0–0	3–1	0–2		3–3	1–0
Baia Mare	0–7	0–2	0–2	1–4	0–3	2–0	0–3	0–2	0–4	1–3	1–2	2–1	3–1	1–2		3–0
Minaur Zlatna	0–3	1–3	0–3	0–1	0–1	0–1	0–5	0–3	1–3	1–4	1–6	0–2	0–2	0–3	1–0	

Source: tribuna (in Romanian)
Legend: Blue = home team win; Yellow = draw; Red = away team win.

==== Top scorers ====
Rank	Player	Team	Goals
1	(Romania) Gabriel Apetri	Jiul Petroșani	17
2	(Romania) Cristian Turcu	CFR Cluj	13
2	(Romania) Răzvan Cociș	Universitatea Cluj	12
3	(Romania) Robert Roszel	Olimpia Satu Mare	11
5	(Romania) Damian Militaru	Jiul Petroșani	7
5	(Romania) Dan Codreanu	Universitatea Cluj	7

== See also ==
- 2003–04 Divizia A
- 2003–04 Divizia C
- 2003–04 Divizia D
- 2003–04 Cupa României
