= 2003–04 Divizia D =

62nd season of the Liga IV, the fourth tier of the Romanian football league

Liga IV
- Season: 2003–04

The 2003–04 Divizia D was the 62nd season of the Liga IV, the fourth tier of the Romanian football league system. The champions of each county association promoted to Divizia C without promotion play-off.

== County leagues ==
- Alba (AB)
- Arad (AR)
- Argeș (AG)
- Bacău (BC)
- Bihor (BH)
- Bistrița-Năsăud (BN)
- Botoșani (BT)
- Brașov (BV)
- Brăila (BR)
- Bucharest (B)
- Buzău (BZ)
- Caraș-Severin (CS)
- Călărași (CL)
- Cluj (CJ)
- Constanța (CT)
- Covasna (CV)
- Dâmbovița (DB)
- Dolj (DJ)
- Galați (GL)
- Giurgiu (GR)
- Gorj (GJ)
- Harghita (HR)
- Hunedoara (HD)
- Ialomița (IL)
- Iași (IS)
- Ilfov (IF)
- Maramureș (MM)
- Mehedinți (MH)
- Mureș (MS)
- Neamț (NT)
- Olt (OT)
- Prahova (PH)
- Satu Mare (SM)
- Sălaj (SJ)
- Sibiu (SB)
- Suceava (SV)
- Teleorman (TR)
- Timiș (TM)
- Tulcea (TL)
- Vaslui (VS)
- Vâlcea (VL)
- Vrancea (VN)

=== Arad County ===
Pos	Team	Pld	W	D	L	GF	GA	GD	Pts	Promotion or relegation
1	Victoria Nădlac (C, P)	28	22	3	3	86	18	+68	69	Promotion to Divizia C
2	Gloria CTP Arad	28	20	5	3	73	22	+51	65	
3	Mureșul Zădăreni	28	17	4	7	52	29	+23	55	
4	Voința Mailat	28	12	7	9	52	51	+1	43	
5	Aqua Vest Arad	28	12	5	11	56	49	+7	41	
6	Dacia Beliu	28	11	6	11	42	38	+4	39	
7	Voința Macea	28	12	6	10	47	43	+4	42	
8	UTA Arad II	28	9	10	9	34	40	−6	37	
9	Romvest Arad	28	10	5	13	55	48	+7	35	
10	Universitatea Vinga	28	9	6	13	52	56	−4	33	
11	Șoimii Pâncota	28	8	8	12	36	35	+1	32	
12	Olimpia Bârzava	28	9	3	16	55	67	−12	30	
13	Înfrățirea Iratoșu	28	8	5	15	30	58	−28	29	
14	Crișul Chișineu-Criș	28	7	6	15	39	85	−46	27	
15	Șoimii Lipova	28	3	3	22	23	93	−70	12	Relegation to Arad County Championship
16	Vulturii Socodor (Note: Vulturii Socodor withdrew in the first part of the season and all its results were canceled.)	0	0	0	0	0	0	0	0	Withdrew

Rules for classification: 1) Points; 2) Goal difference; 3) Number of goals scored.
(C) Champions; (P) Promoted

=== Bihor County ===
Pos	Team	Pld	W	D	L	GF	GA	GD	Pts	Promotion or relegation
1	Olimpia Salonta (C, P)	28	26	0	2	108	26	+82	78	Promotion to Divizia C
2	Bihorul Beiuș	28	23	2	3	80	20	+60	71	
3	Lotus Băile Felix	28	23	1	4	105	27	+78	70	
4	Regiana Cefa	28	14	7	7	66	32	+34	49	
5	Unirea Valea lui Mihai	28	14	3	11	48	44	+4	45	
6	Crișul Aleșd	28	12	8	8	50	32	+18	44	
7	Oțelul Ștei	28	11	6	11	40	43	−3	39	
8	Biharea Vașcău	28	10	2	16	27	63	−36	32	
9	Crișana Tinca	28	8	4	16	27	62	−35	28	
10	Romtrans Oradea	28	7	6	15	28	51	−23	27	
11	Petrolul Suplac	28	7	5	16	44	81	−37	26	
12	Petrom Abram	28	7	5	16	38	53	−15	26	
13	Locadin Țețchea	28	7	5	16	47	73	−26	26	
14	Tricolorul Damore Alparea	28	4	8	16	27	65	−38	20	
15	Bihoreana Marghita	28	5	2	21	25	88	−63	15 (Note: Bihoreana Marghita deducted 2 points.)	
16	Tileagd (Note: Tileagd withdrew in the first part of the season and all its results were canceled.) (R)	0	0	0	0	0	0	0	0	Expelled

Rules for classification: 1) Points; 2) Goal difference; 3) Number of goals scored.
(C) Champions; (P) Promoted; (R) Relegated

=== Caraș-Severin County ===
Pos	Team	Pld	W	D	L	GF	GA	GD	Pts	Promotion or relegation
1	Universitatea Reșița (C, P)	30	25	2	3	85	19	+66	77	Promotion to Divizia C
2	Gloria Reșița	30	24	2	4	95	25	+70	74	
3	Luisa Radimna	30	18	5	7	68	52	+16	59	
4	Muncitorul Reșița	30	17	5	8	71	37	+34	56	
5	Hercules Băile Herculane	30	15	5	10	53	39	+14	50	
6	Oravița	30	13	6	11	38	42	−4	45	
7	Berzasca	30	12	7	11	56	45	+11	43	
8	Minerul Anina	30	10	9	11	41	42	−1	39	
9	Arsenal Reșița	30	10	6	14	52	54	−2	36	
10	Metalul Bocșa	30	9	7	14	42	52	−10	34	
11	Timișul Slatina-Timiș	30	9	7	14	47	70	−23	34	
12	Dunărea Moldova Nouă	30	10	2	18	36	78	−42	32	
13	Nera Bozovici	30	8	6	16	38	58	−20	30	
14	Ibrilont Ohaba-Mâtnic	30	8	5	17	34	54	−20	29	
15	Metalul Oțelu Roșu	30	4	11	15	30	68	−38	23	
16	Foresta Zăvoi	30	4	2	24	43	89	−46	14	

Rules for classification: 1) Points; 2) Goal difference; 3) Number of goals scored.
(C) Champions; (P) Promoted

=== Covasna County ===
Pos	Team	Pld	W	D	L	GF	GA	GD	Pts	Promotion or relegation
1	KSE Târgu Secuiesc (C, P)	30	22	4	4	107	21	+86	70	Promotion to Divizia C
2	Stăruința Bodoc	30	20	5	5	79	22	+57	65	
3	Valea Crișului	30	21	1	8	61	32	+29	64	
4	Perkő Sânzieni	30	15	5	10	56	34	+22	50	
5	Előre Tălișoara	30	15	5	10	55	33	+22	50	
6	Baraolt	30	14	6	10	64	41	+23	48	
7	Nemere Ghelința	30	14	4	12	44	61	−17	46	
8	Ojdula	30	12	8	10	58	50	+8	44	
9	Micfalău	30	13	3	14	52	60	−8	42	
10	Câmpul Frumos	30	10	10	10	59	62	−3	40	
11	Avântul Ilieni	30	10	7	13	49	58	−9	37	
12	Prima Brăduț	30	10	2	18	38	72	−34	32	
13	Progresul Sita Buzăului	30	9	4	17	58	95	−37	31	
14	Carpați Covasna	30	7	9	14	44	56	−12	30	
15	Viitorul Moacșa (R)	30	7	1	22	41	89	−48	22	Relegation to Liga V Covasna
16	Spartacus Hăghig (R)	30	3	2	25	44	125	−81	11	Relegation to Liga V Covasna

Rules for classification: 1) Points; 2) Goal difference; 3) Number of goals scored.
(C) Champions; (P) Promoted; (R) Relegated

=== Dâmbovița County ===
Pos	Team	Pld	W	D	L	GF	GA	GD	Pts	Promotion or relegation
1	Gloria Iris Cornești (C, P)	30	25	4	1	96	17	+79	79	Promotion to Divizia C
2	Petrolul Steaua Târgoviște	30	20	1	9	94	15	+79	61	
3	Electrica Fieni	30	17	4	9	45	47	−2	53 (Note: Electrica Fieni deducted 2 points.)	
4	Metalul Mija	30	16	4	10	45	26	+19	52	
5	Avicola Crevedia	30	16	2	12	69	36	+33	50	
6	Oțelul PAS Pucioasa	30	15	4	11	55	47	+8	49	
7	Renel Doicești	30	14	3	13	46	45	+1	45	
8	Chimia Găești	30	13	3	14	42	54	−12	42	
9	CSȘ Nucet	30	12	3	15	52	53	−1	39	
10	Larexim Comișani	30	11	4	15	43	65	−22	37	
11	Compan Târgoviște	30	11	3	16	40	53	−13	36	
12	Petrolul Corbii Mari	30	10	5	15	42	50	−8	35	
13	Motorep Viișoara	30	11	2	17	45	46	−1	35	
14	Minerul Șotânga	30	9	1	20	30	87	−57	28	
15	Victoria Moreni (R)	30	7	3	20	29	64	−35	24	Relegation to Liga V Dâmbovița
16	Unirea Cobia (R)	30	8	2	20	40	108	−68	20 (Note: Unirea Cobia deducted 6 points.)	Relegation to Liga V Dâmbovița

Rules for classification: 1) Points; 2) Goal difference; 3) Number of goals scored.
(C) Champions; (P) Promoted; (R) Relegated

=== Dolj County ===
Team changes from previous season.

Promoted to Divizia C

- Știința CFR Craiova

Relegated from Divizia C

- —

Promoted from Dolj Elite Category

- ~~Șoimii Maglavit (Seria I winners)~~
- Progresul Castranova (Seria II winners)
- ~~Venus Mofleni (Seria III winners)~~

Relegated to Dolj Elite Category

- Progresul Segarcea
- Spicul Unirea

Other changes

- Șoimii Maglavit and Venus Mofleni ceded their places in Divizia D to Rapid Almăj and Recolta Urzicuța.

Pos	Team	Pld	W	D	L	GF	GA	GD	Pts	Promotion or relegation
1	ȘF "Gică Popescu" Craiova (C, P)	34	30	3	1	141	15	+126	93	Promotion to Divizia C
2	Chimia Craiova	34	29	4	1	120	17	+103	91	
3	Unirea Podari	34	25	5	4	86	18	+68	80	
4	Avântul RAT Ișalnița	34	21	2	11	65	42	+23	65	
5	Victoria Călărași	34	18	4	12	90	59	+31	58	
6	Mârșani	34	17	0	17	95	55	+40	51	
7	Gaz Metan Pielești	34	14	7	13	79	51	+28	49	
8	Unirea Tricolor Dăbuleni	34	14	4	16	52	67	−15	46	
9	Progresul Băilești	34	14	4	16	57	80	−23	46	
10	Recolta Ostroveni	34	13	6	15	56	63	−7	45	
11	Vânătorul Desa	34	14	3	17	62	80	−18	45	
12	Portul Bechet	34	12	5	17	66	69	−3	41	
13	Tricolor Sadova (R)	34	13	5	16	58	84	−26	41 (Note: Tricolor Sadova deducted 3 points.)	Qualification to relegation play-out
14	Progresul Ciupercenii Vechi (O)	34	10	5	19	61	87	−26	35	Qualification to relegation play-out
15	Filiași (O)	34	9	5	20	54	87	−33	32	Qualification to relegation play-out
16	Recolta Urzicuța (R)	34	7	4	23	46	137	−91	25	Relegation to Dolj Elite Category
17	Progresul Castranova (R)	34	3	6	25	35	135	−100	15	Relegation to Dolj Elite Category
18	Rapid Almăj (Note: Rapid Almăj excluded after 30 rounds and lost all the remaining matches with 0–3.) (R)	34	6	2	26	34	111	−77	20	Relegation to Dolj Elite Category

Rules for classification: 1) Points; 2) Goal difference; 3) Number of goals scored.
(C) Champions; (O) Play-off winners; (P) Promoted; (R) Relegated
Notes:

Relegation play-out

The 13th, 14th and 15th-placed teams of the Divizia D faces the 2nd placed teams from the three series of Dolj Elite Category.
The matches was played on 12 June 2004, at Băilești, Craiova on Constructorul Stadium and Ișalnița.

Team 1	Score	Team 2
Tricolor Sadova	0–3 w/o	Șoimii Maglavit
Progresul Ciupercenii Vechi	2–0	Fulgerul Mârșani
Filiași	6–1	Amaradia Melinești

=== Galați County ===
Pos	Team	Pld	W	D	L	GF	GA	GD	Pts	Promotion or relegation
1	Junkers Galați (C, P)	30	27	2	1	149	11	+138	83	Promotion to Divizia C
2	Metal Galați	30	22	3	5	126	39	+87	69	
3	Sporting Voința Liești	30	21	3	6	72	40	+32	66	
4	Sporting Tecuci	30	17	2	11	83	43	+40	53	
5	Bujorii Târgu Bujor	30	14	6	10	53	59	−6	48	
6	Metalosport Galați	30	13	6	11	53	47	+6	45	
7	Viitorul Berești	30	14	1	15	50	55	−5	43	
8	Avântul Liești	30	12	3	15	53	55	−2	39	
9	Progresul Măstăcani	30	10	7	13	37	59	−22	37	
10	Mălina Smârdan	30	11	2	17	58	74	−16	35	
11	Dunis Ivești	30	10	5	15	46	64	−18	35	
12	Voința Cudalbi	30	11	1	18	36	68	−32	34	
13	Dunărea Galați II	30	10	1	19	38	64	−26	31	
14	Muncitorul Ghidigeni	30	8	5	17	46	119	−73	29	
15	Dueta Fântânele	30	8	4	18	41	91	−50	28	
16	Petrol Plus Oancea	30	4	2	24	13	72	−59	14	

Rules for classification: 1) Points; 2) Goal difference; 3) Number of goals scored.
(C) Champions; (P) Promoted

=== Harghita County ===
Pos	Team	Pld	W	D	L	GF	GA	GD	Pts	Promotion or relegation
1	Viitorul Gheorgheni (C, P)	20	19	1	0	81	8	+73	58	Promotion to Divizia C
2	Știința Sărmaș	20	16	2	2	68	19	+49	50	
3	Homorodul Merești	20	14	0	6	62	42	+20	42	
4	Roseal Odorheiu Secuiesc	20	13	1	6	67	29	+38	40	
5	Făgetul Borsec	20	8	3	9	47	66	−19	27	
6	CSȘ Miercurea Ciuc	20	8	2	10	42	43	−1	26	
7	DomSat Sândominic	20	7	1	12	34	52	−18	22	
8	Promtforest Toplița	20	6	3	11	34	38	−4	21	
9	Unirea Cristuru Secuiesc	20	6	2	12	32	52	−20	20	
10	Bucinul Joseni	20	3	0	17	13	73	−60	9	
11	Ditroit Ditrău	20	1	1	18	17	74	−57	4	

Rules for classification: 1) Points; 2) Goal difference; 3) Number of goals scored.
(C) Champions; (P) Promoted

=== Mureș County ===
Pos	Team	Pld	W	D	L	GF	GA	GD	Pts	Qualification or relegation
1	Mureșul Romvelo Luduș (Q)	20	14	4	2	54	12	+42	46	Qualification to play-off
2	Gliga Companies Reghin (Q)	20	12	3	5	56	19	+37	39	Qualification to play-off
3	Trans-Sil Târgu Mureș (Q)	20	11	5	4	47	22	+25	38	Qualification to play-off
4	Dealu Mare Sighișoara (Q)	20	11	3	6	46	31	+15	36	Qualification to play-off
5	Mureșul Rușii-Munți (Q)	20	11	2	7	35	29	+6	35	Qualification to play-off
6	Târnava Mică Sângeorgiu de Pădure (Q)	20	9	3	8	38	39	−1	30	Qualification to play-off
7	Avântul Miheșu de Câmpie	20	9	2	9	52	41	+11	29	
8	Iernut	20	9	2	9	36	35	+1	29	
9	Sticla Târnaveni	20	7	5	8	35	25	+10	26	
10	Mureșul Chirileu	20	1	2	17	21	89	−68	5	
11	Mureșul Târgu Mureș	20	0	1	19	4	72	−68	1	

Rules for classification: 1) Points; 2) Goal difference; 3) Number of goals scored.
(Q) Qualified for the phase indicated

Championship play-off

Pos	Team	Pld	W	D	L	GF	GA	GD	Pts	Qualification
1	Mureșul Romvelo Luduș (C, Q)	20	12	6	2	39	13	+26	42	Qualification to promotion play-off
2	Gliga Companies Reghin	20	13	2	5	32	13	+19	41	
3	Trans-Sil Târgu Mureș	20	11	3	6	37	24	+13	36	
4	Dealu Mare Sighișoara	20	5	4	11	32	48	−16	19	
5	Mureșul Rușii-Munți	20	4	4	12	31	38	−7	16	
6	Târnava Mică Sângeorgiu de Pădure	20	4	3	13	18	53	−35	15	

Rules for classification: 1) Points; 2) Goal difference; 3) Number of goals scored.
(C) Champions; (Q) Qualified for the phase indicated

=== Neamț County ===
Pos	Team	Pld	W	D	L	GF	GA	GD	Pts	Promotion or relegation
1	LPS Piatra Neamț (C, P)	30	26	0	4	134	37	+97	78	Promotion to Divizia C
2	Victoria Horia	30	22	2	6	87	36	+51	68	
3	Speranța Răucești	30	20	3	7	108	66	+42	63	
4	Inter Gârcina	30	19	4	7	70	42	+28	61	
5	Mavex Săvinești	30	15	2	13	68	56	+12	47	
6	Voința Ion Creangă	30	14	4	12	71	64	+7	46	
7	Vulturul Zănești	30	14	1	15	63	77	−14	43	
8	Viitorul Podoleni	30	12	6	12	75	57	+18	42	
9	Biruința Gherăiești	30	11	5	14	87	98	−11	38	
10	Spicul Tămășeni	30	11	5	14	49	64	−15	38	
11	Flacăra Brusturi	30	10	6	14	56	66	−10	36	
12	Bradul Roznov	30	10	2	18	56	84	−28	32	
13	Avântul Cordun	30	8	6	16	58	74	−16	30	
14	Viitorul Ruginoasa	30	9	3	18	44	103	−59	30	
15	Voința Pângărați	30	7	3	20	38	74	−36	24	
16	Grumăzești	30	5	2	23	46	112	−66	17	

Rules for classification: 1) Points; 2) Goal difference; 3) Number of goals scored.
(C) Champions; (P) Promoted

=== Timiș County ===
Pos	Team	Pld	W	D	L	GF	GA	GD	Pts	Promotion or relegation
1	Jimbolia (C, P)	30	26	2	2	95	20	+75	80	Promotion to Divizia C
2	Calor Timișoara	30	21	2	7	89	35	+54	65	
3	Textila Timișoara	30	18	6	6	72	29	+43	60	
4	Hexe Jebel	30	18	6	6	64	31	+33	60	
5	Unirea Peciu Nou	30	16	6	8	62	46	+16	54	
6	Frontiera Moravița	30	17	2	11	62	40	+22	53	
7	Timișul Albina	30	13	4	13	51	60	−9	43	
8	Telecom Timișul Șag	30	12	6	12	49	57	−8	40 (Note: Telecom Timișul Șag deducted 2 points.)	
9	Bega Belinț	30	12	4	14	48	68	−20	40	
10	Giarmata	30	12	3	15	60	48	+12	39	
11	Nuova Mama Mia Becicherecu Mic	30	11	3	16	37	49	−12	36	
12	ASU Politehnica Timișoara	30	9	5	16	42	62	−20	32	
13	Comprest Lugoj	30	9	3	18	36	66	−30	30	
14	Srbianca Deta	30	7	5	18	36	60	−24	26	
15	Plavii Delia Sânpetru Mare (R)	30	5	1	24	30	83	−53	16	Relegation to Timiș County Championship
16	Unirea Banloc (R)	30	4	2	24	31	98	−67	14	Relegation to Timiș County Championship

Rules for classification: 1) Points; 2) Goal difference; 3) Number of goals scored.
(C) Champions; (P) Promoted; (R) Relegated

== See also ==
- 2003–04 Divizia A
- 2003–04 Divizia B
- 2003–04 Cupa României
