= Vânju Mare =

- Town
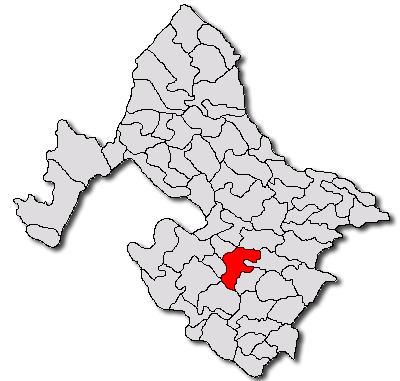
- Location in Mehedinți County

- Location in Romania
- Coordinates: 44°25′30″N 22°52′10″E
- Country: Romania
- County: Mehedinți

Government
  - Mayor (2024–2028): Alexandru Mijaiche (PSD)
- Area: 93.57 km^{2} (36.13 sq mi)
- Elevation: 100 m (330 ft)
- Population (2021-12-01): 5,078
  - Density: 54.27/km^{2} (140.6/sq mi)
- Time zone: UTC+02:00 (EET)
  - Summer (DST): UTC+03:00 (EEST)
- Postal code: 225400
- Area code: (+40) 02 52
- Vehicle reg.: MH
- Website: primariavinjumare.ro

Historical population
Year	Pop.	±%
1977	8,508	—
1992	7,645	−10.1%
2002	7,074	−7.5%
2011	5,311	−24.9%
2021	5,078	−4.4%
Source: Census data

Vânju Mare is a small town located in Mehedinți County, Romania. Four villages are administered by the town: Bucura, Nicolae Bălcescu, Orevița Mare, and Traian. It is situated in the historical region of Oltenia.

== Natives ==
- Victor Gomoiu (1882–1960), surgeon, medical historian, and politician
- Dan Iordăchescu (1930–2015), baritone
- Liliana Năstase (born 1962), track and field runner
- Flavius Stoican (born 1976), footballer and football manager

== See also ==
- CS Building Vânju Mare
- Stadionul Victoria (Vânju Mare)
