= CS Minerul Mehedinți =

Romanian football club

Minerul Mehedinți
- Full name: Clubul Sportiv Minerul Mehedinți
- Nickname(s): Minerii (The Miners)
- Short name: Minerul
- Founded: 1994; 2010 (refounded)
- Dissolved: 2015
- Ground: Minerul
- Capacity: 500
- 2014–15: Liga III, Seria IV, 13th (relegated)

Clubul Sportiv Minerul Mehedinți, commonly known as Minerul Mehedinți or Minerul Valea Copcii, was a Romanian football club based in Valea Copcii, Mehedinți County, founded in 1994 and dissolved in 2015. At its best, Minerul was ranked 3rd in the Liga III.

== History ==
Minerul Mehedinți achieved promotion to Divizia C at the end of the 2002–03 season after winning the Divizia D – Mehedinți County Championship, with Dorian Gugu as player-coach.

In the following seven consecutive seasons spent in the third tier of Romanian football, the club based in Valea Copcii consistently ranked among the top six teams: 5th in 2003–04 with Florin Cioroianu as head coach, 6th in 2004–05 under Marian Brihac and, from November 2004, Florin Cioroianu, 4th in 2005–06, 3rd in 2006–07, 5th in 2007–08, 3rd in 2008–09, both seasons coached by Cornel Mihart, and 6th in 2009–10 with Flavius Stoican as head coach.

In 2010, due to the financial withdrawal of its main sponsor, the National Company of Lignite Oltenia, the club ceded its Liga III place to Minerul Motru.

Minerul, coached by Cristian Boboescu, returned to Liga III at the end of the 2013–14 season, winning the Liga IV – Mehedinți County and the promotion play-off match against Gilortul Târgu Cărbunești, the Liga IV – Gorj County champion, 2–0 after extra time, at the 1 Mai Stadium in Slatina.

== Honours ==
Liga IV – Mehedinți County

- Winners (2): 2002–03, 2013–14

== Former managers ==
- (Romania) Dorian Gugu
- (Romania) Florin Cioroianu (2003−2004)
- (Romania) Marian Brihac (2004)
- (Romania) Florin Cioroianu (2004−2004)
- (Romania) Valeriu Tița
- (Romania) Dumitru Vizitiu
- (Romania) Emerich Vascko
- (Romania) Cornel Mihart (2007−2009)
- (Romania) Flavius Stoican (2009−2010)
