= Nicolae Szoboszlay =

Romanian footballer and manager (1925–2019)

Personal information
- Date of birth: 18 July 1925
- Place of birth: Orăștie, Romania
- Date of death: 2 January 2019 (aged 93)
- Place of death: Romania
- Height: 1.79 m (5 ft 10 in)
- Position: Goalkeeper

Senior career*
Years	Team	Apps	(Gls)
1943–1944	Universitatea Cluj (Note: The 1940–41 Divizia A was the last season before World War II and the 1946–47 Divizia A was the first one after, so the appearances and goals scored during this period for Universitatea Cluj are not official.)	0	(0)
1945–1946	Ferar Cluj		
1946–1947	Universitatea Cluj	1	(0)
1947–1948	Dermagarand Târgu Mureș	35	(0)
1948	CSCA București	7	(0)
1949	Armata Iași		
1950	Dermagarand Târgu Mureș	6	(0)
1950–1951	Universitatea Cluj	27	(0)
1952–1953	Armata Cluj		
1953	Universitatea Cluj	5	(0)
Total		81	(0)

International career
1948	Romania B	1	(0)

Managerial career
- 1955–1956: Dermata Cluj
- 1957: Universitatea Cluj
- 1957–1958: Universitatea Cluj (assistant)
- 1958–1959: Dermata Cluj
- 1959–1961: Arieșul Turda
- 1962–1963: Universitatea Cluj (assistant)
- 1966–1967: Industria Sârmei Câmpia Turzii
- 1967: Universitatea Cluj
- 1968: Universitatea Cluj (assistant)
- 1969–1972: Arieșul Turda
- 1973–1974: Corvinul Hunedoara
- 1974–1976: CFR Cluj
- 1976–1985: Universitatea Cluj (juniors)
- * Club domestic league appearances and goals

Nicolae Szoboszlay (also known as Nicolae Săbăslău; 18 July 1925 – 2 January 2019) was a Romanian football goalkeeper and manager.

== Club career ==
Szoboszlay, nicknamed "Portarul Zburător" (The Flying Goalkeeper), was born on 18 July 1925 in Orăștie, Romania. He began playing football at Universitatea Cluj during the hardest period of the club's history, as in 1940, the team moved from Cluj to Sibiu as a result of the Second Vienna Award, when the northern part of Transylvania was ceded to Hungary. In 1945, after the end of the Second World War and the return of the northern part of Transylvania to Romania, "U" returned to its home in Cluj. During that period he participated in a game played in Ploiești, which was postponed for one day due to a fog caused by the bombs thrown in the city by the United States Army Air Forces. In 1944, because of his Hungarian origins, Szoboszlay was forced to work for two months at the București-Craiova railway.

In 1945, Szoboszlay joined Ferar Cluj, but returned one year later to "U" Cluj in Divizia A, only to leave again in 1947 to play for Dermagarand Târgu Mureș in the same league. In 1948 he played for CSCA București under the name "Nicolae Săbăslău", as the person who was sent to Bucharest to make his ID wrongly wrote his name that way. On 21 November 1948 he played under coach Colea Vâlcov in the first ever CSCA București – Dinamo București derby. Subsequently, Szoboszlay went to Divizia C side Armata Iași and then made a comeback to Dermagarand Târgu Mureș in 1950. In the second half of the same year, he had his third spell at "U" Cluj, helping them gain promotion to Divizia A.

In 1952, he joined Divizia B club Armata Cluj. There, in May 1953 after one game, the team's coach Elemer Hirsch collapsed on his way to the team bus, and Szoboszlay tried to give him first aid, but Hirsch died in his arms. Szoboszlay ended his career in 1953, after playing five Divizia A matches for Universitatea Cluj.

== International career ==
On 24 October 1948, Szoboszlay played for Romania B in a 4–0 loss to Hungary B.

== Managerial career ==
After he retired from his playing career, Szoboszlay worked as a manager and as an assistant coach. His coaching career began in 1955 at Divizia B team Dermata Cluj. In 1957, he went to Universitatea Cluj, first as head coach, and then as an assistant of Ștefan Kovács, together gaining first-league promotion in the 1957–58 season. In 1958, he returned to Dermata as head coach, helping them earn promotion from Divizia C to the second league. Subsequently, Szoboszlay worked for Arieșul Turda which he helped reach the quarter-finals in the 1960–61 Cupa României, but was replaced afterwards, yet the club managed to win the competition without him. In 1962, he returned as an assistant coach of Constantin Rădulescu at "U" Cluj. In 1966, Szoboszlay served as head coach for one year in Divizia B at Industria Sârmei Câmpia Turzii, returning afterwards to Universitatea Cluj in first league football for one and a half years as head coach but also as an assistant of Constantin Teașcă. From 1969 to 1972, he coached Arieșul Turda, leading them to promotion from the third league to the second in the 1970–71 season. In 1972, he led Divizia B club Corvinul Hunedoara for one year. Subsequently, from 1974 to 1976, Szoboszlay worked as head coach for CFR Cluj in the first league. He has a total of 107 matches as a manager in the Romanian top-division, Divizia A, consisting of 36 victories, 29 draws and 42 losses. Between 1976 and 1985, Szoboszlay was the coordinator of the Center for Children and Juniors at Universitatea Cluj where he taught generations of players such as Remus Câmpeanu, Emil Petru, Vasile Suciu, Septimiu Câmpeanu, Alpar Meszaros, Zsolt Muzsnay, Ioan Sabău and Tiberiu Bălan.

== Personal life and death ==
On 18 July 2013, on the occasion of his 88th birthday, Szoboszlay was awarded the Honorary Citizen of Cluj County title. A book about him was written by Cristian Aszalos, titled Ultimul cavaler al fotbalului romantic, Nicolae Szoboszlay (The last knight of romantic football, Nicolae Szoboszlay), which was released on 26 November 2016.

Szoboszlay died on 2 January 2019 at age 93.

== Honours ==
=== Player ===
Universitatea Cluj

- Divizia B: 1950

=== Manager ===
Universitatea Cluj (assistant)

- Divizia B: 1957–58

Dermata Cluj

- Divizia C: 1958–59

Arieșul Turda

- Divizia C: 1970–71
