= CS Blejoi =

Romanian football club

- Full name: Clubul Sportiv Blejoi
- Short name: Blejoi
- Founded: 2008; 18 years ago
- Ground: Comunal
- Capacity: 1,500 (700 seated)
- Owner: Blejoi Commune
- Chairman: Gheorghe Biziniche
- Manager: Răzvan Vlad
- League: Liga III
- 2025–26: Liga III, Seria I, 8th
- Website: www.csblejoi.ro
| Home colours | Away colours |

Clubul Sportiv Blejoi, commonly known as CS Blejoi or simply as Blejoi, is a Romanian professional football club based in Blejoi, Prahova County. The club was founded in 2008 and currently competes in Liga III, the third tier of Romanian football.

== History ==
CS Blejoi was founded in 2008 and started in Liga C – Prahova County, the sixth tier of the Romanian football league system and the third level within the county structure, and was promoted to the county’s second tier at the end of the 2008–09 season under coach Constantin Ioniță.

After spending two years in the fifth tier, in 2011 the club bought the place of newly promoted Intersport Filipeștii de Târg in Liga IV – Prahova County and was renamed Vispești Blejoi, after the company that sponsored the team. Aurel Panait took over as head coach for the 2011–12 season, leading the team through the first eleven rounds before being replaced in October 2011 by former top-flight coach Victor Roșca, who guided the team to finish as runners-up and win the Prahova County phase of the Cupa României, with a squad that included B. Manea, Năescu, Al. Popa, Ad. Ioniță, B. Onuț (cpt), Nincă, Secrețeanu, Bridinel, Cr. Vlad, V. Răducanu, Sterie, Al. Simion, R. Catană, I. Radu, Fl. Gheorghe, O. Gheorghe, and D. Nae.

In the summer of 2012, after ending the collaboration with businessman Adrian Nistoroiu, the owner of Vispești Glass, the team reverted to the name CS Blejoi, and former team captain Bogdan Onuț was appointed head coach. However, he left the club in December, moving to rival CS Câmpina. He was replaced by Dragoș Mihalache, who managed the team and led them to finish the 2012–13 season in 5th place.

Mihalache was replaced by Răzvan Vlad during the following season, when Blejoi finished 10th. The team improved in the subsequent campaigns, finishing as runners-up in three consecutive seasons 2014–15, 2015–16, and 2016–17, the last time behind Petrolul Ploiești. In the 2017–18 season, CS Blejoi finally won the Liga IV – Prahova County title but failed to secure promotion to Liga III after losing the play-off against the Călărași County champions, Venus Independența, 1–5 away and 1–1 at home.

In the 2018–19 season, CS Blejoi, coached by Răzvan Vlad, won the county championship again and secured promotion to Liga III after defeating CS Mihai Bravu, the champions of Liga IV – Giurgiu County, 9–1 on aggregate (3–0 away and 6–1 at home). In the decisive second leg, Blejoi lined up with Ad. Gheorghe – Cl. Stoica, Bojoagă, Năstase, Vl. Badea (70 Anton) – Ir. Dumitru (cpt) (55 Ghinea), Rudaru – Ruptureanu, D. Iancu (60 Ursu), Chiși (48 Cr. Vasile) – Lambru.

Blejoi’s first season in Liga III was suspended in March 2020 due to the COVID-19 pandemic, with the team sitting mid-table in 8th place in Series III. In the 2020–21 season, Blejoi finished 3rd in Series V, followed by a 5th-place finish in both the regular season and the play-out round of Series V in 2021–22, with Răzvan Vlad replaced after eight years in charge by Marius Vișan.

The 2022–23 campaign proved more successful, as Blejoi and Vișan parted ways in October 2022 after five rounds, with Răzvan Vlad returning to the bench. Under his guidance, the team won Series V and qualified for the promotion play-offs, but was knocked out in the first round by Viitorul Dăești, winning 4–3 away but suffering a heavy 2–6 defeat at home. The squad that season included, among others, Bălănică, Ad. Gheorghe, A. Șerban, Ad. Nicolae, Ciuroiu, Cl. Stoica, Ghinea, C. Munteanu, Pahonțu, Dima, Enache, Mănescu, Brăilă, D. Ilie, Nițescu, Marinache, Costache, G. Bălașa, Cl. Dumitru, and Drăgoi.

In 2023–24, Blejoi finished 3rd in both the regular season and the play-off round of Series IV, and in the following 2024–25 season the club placed 2nd in Series V, once again reaching the promotion play-offs. This time, Blejoi was eliminated by AFC Odorheiu Secuiesc, losing 0–3 away and 1–4 at home.

== Honours ==
Liga III

- Winners (1): 2022–23

Liga IV – Prahova County

- Winners (2): 2017–18, 2018–19
- Runners-up (4): 2011–12, 2014–15, 2015–16, 2016–17

Cupa României – Prahova County

- Winners (2): 2011–12, 2018–19
- Runners-up (1): 2017–18

== Players ==
=== First-team squad ===
As of 10 September 2024

Note: Flags indicate national team as defined under FIFA eligibility rules; some limited exceptions apply. Players may hold more than one non-FIFA nationality.

| No. | Pos. | Nation | Player |
|---|---|---|---|
| 1 | GK | ROU | Eduard Berbeacă (on loan from Petrolul) |
| 2 | DF | ROU | Călin Piscan |
| 3 | DF | ROU | Ovidiu Costache |
| 4 | DF | ROU | Andrei Șerban |
| 7 | FW | ROU | Sebastian Bălașa |
| 8 | MF | ROU | Dragoș Mănescu |
| 9 | FW | ROU | Robert Tudor |
| 10 | MF | ROU | Mihai Nițescu |
| 11 | MF | ROU | Cristian Ionescu |
| 12 | GK | ROU | Paul Cernat |
| 14 | MF | ROU | Mihai Constantinescu |

| No. | Pos. | Nation | Player |
|---|---|---|---|
| 15 | MF | ROU | Sebastian Toma |
| 16 | MF | ROU | Valentin Toroiman |
| 17 | FW | ROU | Răzvan Șchiopu |
| 18 | MF | ROU | David Popenciu |
| 19 | FW | ROU | Mihai Tudor |
| 20 | MF | ROU | Iulian Drăgoi |
| 21 | MF | ROU | Bogdan Dima (Captain) |
| 24 | DF | ROU | Vlad Tudorache (on loan from U Cluj) |
| 25 | FW | ROU | Sebastian Guiu (on loan from Petrolul) |
| 30 | MF | ROU | Nicolae Răducea |
| 33 | GK | ROU | Mihai Cotolan |

=== Out on loan ===
Note: Flags indicate national team as defined under FIFA eligibility rules; some limited exceptions apply. Players may hold more than one non-FIFA nationality.

| No. / Pos. / Nation / Player | No. / Pos. / Nation / Player |

== Club officials ==
=== Board of directors ===
| Role | Name |
|---|---|
| Owners | (Romania) Blejoi Commune |
| President | (Romania) Gheorghe Biziniche |
| Vice-president | (Romania) Constantin Ioniţă |
| Sporting director | (Romania) Irinel Dumitru |
| Press Officer | (Romania) Paul Oprea |

=== Current technical staff ===
| Role | Name |
|---|---|
| Manager | (Romania) Răzvan Vlad |
| Assistant coach | (Romania) Emil Coșieru |
| Goalkeeping coach | (Romania) Adrian Gheorghe |
| Fitness coach | (Romania) Mădălin Ionescu |

== Former managers ==
- (Romania) Aurel Panait (2011)
- (Romania) Victor Roșca (2011–2012)
- (Romania) Bogdan Onuț (2012)
- (Romania) Dragoș Mihalache (2013–2014)
- (Romania) Răzvan Vlad (2014–2022)
- (Romania) Marius Vișan (2022)
- (Romania) Răzvan Vlad (2022–)

== League and Cup history ==
| Season | Tier | Division | Place | Notes | Cupa României |
|---|---|---|---|---|---|
| 2025–26 | 3 | Liga III (Seria II) | TBD | | Second round |
| 2024–25 | 3 | Liga III (Seria V) | 2nd | | Third round |
| 2023–24 | 3 | Liga III (Seria IV) | 3rd | | Third round |
| 2022–23 | 3 | Liga III (Seria V) | 1st (C) | | Third round |
| 2021–22 | 3 | Liga III (Seria V) | 5th | | Second round |
| 2020–21 | 3 | Liga III (Seria V) | 3rd | | Second round |
| 2019–20 | 3 | Liga III (Seria III) | 8th | | First round |
| 2018–19 | 4 | Liga IV (PH) | 1st (C) | Promoted | County phase - W |

| Season | Tier | Division | Place | Notes | Cupa României |
|---|---|---|---|---|---|
| 2017–18 | 4 | Liga IV (PH) | 1st (C) | | County phase - F |
| 2016–17 | 4 | Liga IV (PH) | 2nd | | County phase - QF |
| 2015–16 | 4 | Liga IV (PH) | 2nd | | County phase - R7 |
| 2014–15 | 4 | Liga IV (PH) | 2nd | | County phase - QF |
| 2013–14 | 4 | Liga IV (PH) | 10th | | County phase - QF |
| 2012–13 | 4 | Liga IV (PH) | 5th | | First round |
| 2011–12 | 4 | Liga IV (PH) | 2nd | | County phase - W |
