= Bogdan Onuț =

Romanian footballer

Personal information
- Full name: Bogdan Mihai Onuț
- Date of birth: 13 October 1976 (age 50)
- Place of birth: Ploiești, Romania
- Height: 1.85 m (6 ft 1 in)
- Position: Centre back

Youth career
- Petrolul Ploiești

Senior career*
Years	Team	Apps	(Gls)
1994–2000	Petrolul Ploiești	75	(18)
1995–1996	→ Petrolistul Boldești (loan)		
2000–2003	Dinamo București	71	(7)
2002	→ Poiana Câmpina (loan)	1	(0)
2003–2004	Farul Constanța	22	(0)
2004–2009	Politehnica Iași	130	(3)
2009–2010	Otopeni	12	(1)
2010–2011	Filipeștii de Pădure		
2011–2012	Vispești Blejoi		
2012–2013	Foresta Nehoiu		
Total		310	(29)

Managerial career
- 2010–2011: Filipeștii de Pădure (assistant)
- 2012–2013: Unirea Lipănești
- 2013: CSM Câmpina
Medal record
Dinamo București
Winner	Cupa României	2001
Runner-up	Cupa României	2002
Winner	Cupa României	2003
- * Club domestic league appearances and goals as of 10 August 2008

Bogdan Mihai Onuț (born 13 October 1976) is a Romanian former footballer played as a defender.

== Playing career ==
Onuț was born on 13 October 1976 in Ploiești, Romania. He began playing football at Petrolul Ploiești, making his Divizia A debut on 17 June 1995 under coach Marin Ion in a 2–0 away loss to Inter Sibiu. Shortly afterwards, he joined Divizia C club Petrolistul Boldești for a year-and-a-half stint. Onuț then returned to Petrolul, where in the 1998–99 season, he scored a career-best 12 goals.

In 2000, he moved to Dinamo București and managed to win the 2000–01 Cupa României in his first season, playing the entire match under coach Cornel Dinu in their 4–2 victory against Rocar București in the final. Subsequently, Onuț played two matches in the 2001–02 UEFA Cup campaign, as the team got past Dinamo Tirana in the qualifying round, but they were defeated by Grasshopper in the first round. During the same season, he made 27 league appearances with two goals under coaches Marin Ion and Dinu to help Dinamo win the championship. Furthermore, he also played for the club's then satellite team Poiana Câmpina in the second league. Onuț started the following season by playing in both legs of the 4–1 aggregate loss to Club Brugge in the 2002–03 Champions League second qualifying round. He finished the season by winning the Cupa României, playing the full 90 minutes under coach Ioan Andone in the 1–0 victory against Național București in the final.

For the 2003–04 season, Onuț played for Farul Constanța, after which he moved to Politehnica Iași. There, he made his last Liga I appearance on 23 May 2009 in a 4–1 away loss to Otopeni, totaling 298 matches with 28 goals in the competition. From 2009 to 2013, he played for Otopeni, Filipeștii de Pădure, Vispești Blejoi and Foresta Nehoiu in the Romanian lower leagues, helping the latter gain promotion to the third league, retiring afterwards.

== Managerial career ==
Onuț began his coaching career as an assistant to Victor Roșca during the 2010–11 Liga III season at Filipeștii de Pădure while he was still an active player for the club. In January 2012, he took over Unirea Lipănești, while still being an active player at Vispești Blejoi. Subsequently, in 2013, he briefly served as the head coach of both Unirea Lipănești and CSM Câmpina at the same time. During the same year, Onuț moved to the United States, settling in Houston where he coached at Dynamo Houston's youth center.

== Honours ==
Dinamo București

- Divizia A: 2001–02
- Cupa României: 2000–01, 2002–03

Foresta Nehoiu

- Liga IV: 2012–13
