= Stadionul Comunal (Blejoi) =

Multi-purpose stadium in Romania

- Arena Blejoi
- Interactive map of Stadionul Comunal
- Address: DN1B
- Location: Blejoi, Romania
- Coordinates: 44°58′59.4″N 26°00′48.2″E
- Owner: Commune of Blejoi
- Operator: CS Blejoi
- Capacity: 1,500 (700 seated)
- Surface: Grass

Construction
- Opened: 2011

Tenant
- Blejoi (2011–present)

Stadionul Comunal is a multi-purpose stadium in Blejoi, Romania. It is currently used mostly for football matches, is the home ground of CS Blejoi and has a capacity of 1,500 seats.
