= ACS Sticla Arieșul Turda =

Romanian football club

Sticla Arieșul Turda
- Full name: Asociația Club Sportiv Sticla Arieșul Turda
- Nicknames: Turdenii (The People from Turda); Sticlarii (The Glassmakers); Vulturii roșii (The Red Eagles)
- Short name: Arieșul
- Founded: 1922; 104 years ago as Muncitorul Turda; 2016; 10 years ago as Sticla Arieșul Turda
- Ground: Municipal
- Capacity: 10,000
- Owner: Turda Municipality
- Chairman: Artur Podar
- Manager: Marius Popescu
- League: Liga IV
- 2025–26: Liga III, Seria VIII, 12th (withdrew)
Home colours	Away colours

Asociația Club Sportiv Sticla Arieșul Turda, commonly known as Sticla Arieșul Turda, or simply as Arieșul Turda, is a Romanian football club from Turda, Cluj County, currently competing in Liga IV – Cluj County, the fourth tier of the Romanian football league system.

Established in 1922 the club spent most of its history in the second and in the third leagues of Romania. Its best performance was winning the 1960–61 Cupa României against Rapid București. With that performance, the club entered the history of Romanian football as the only club which succeeded to win the Romanian Cup without ever playing in the top league.

== History ==
The football club from the industrial town of Turda was founded in 1922 under the name Muncitorul Turda (lit. 'The Turda Worker') and represented the local glass factory. For more than a decade, its team competed in the regional championship until 1936, when it qualified for the national level for the first time.

In the 1936–37 season, Arieșul – named after the Arieș river that flows through Turda – joined the newly established Divizia C. The team finished last in Series I of the North League and withdrew midway through the following season.

During the post-war period, Divizia C was not held regularly, so the club played at the regional level. In 1950, it was renamed Flamura Roșie Turda. In the 1952 season, Flamura Roșie won the Cluj Regional Championship. After defeating Spartac Salonta in the first promotion round, they lost the decisive match against Metalul Hunedoara.

In 1957, the glass factory team merged with another local side, Progresul Turda, restoring the historic name Arieșul Turda and competing in Divizia C, finishing 3rd in the 1957–58 season and 4th in 1958–59.

When Divizia C was dissolved again in 1959, Arieșul returned to the Cluj Regional Championship. In the 1959–60 season, the team won the title but failed to secure promotion after finishing 4th in the final tournament held in Arad, behind Voința Târgu Mureș, Dinamo Săsar, and Voința Oradea. However, due to the merger between CFR Cluj and Rapid Cluj, Arieșul took CFR Cluj’s place in Divizia B.

The 1960–61 season remains a landmark in Arieșul Turda’s history. Initially coached by Nicolae Szoboszlay and from October 1961 by Ștefan Wetzer, the team finished 6th in Series III of Divizia B. More importantly, Arieșul made a historic run in the Cupa României, eliminating Corvinul Hunedoara (2–0), Penicilina Iași (7–1), Știința Timișoara (2–1), and UTA Arad (3–0) on the way to the final. On 12 November 1961, Arieșul defeated Rapid București 2–1 at the Republicii Stadium, lifting the Cupa României. The squad that played in the final included Vasile Suciu, Eugen Pantea, Ioachim Zăhan, Alexandru Vădan, Eugen Luparu, Ion Onacă, Vasile Mărgineanu, Vasile Pârvu, Dionisie Ursu, Gheorghe Băluțiu, and Liviu Husar.

Despite this achievement, Arieșul was unable to build on its successes, finishing 8th in both the 1961–62 and 1962–63 seasons, and 13th at the end of the 1963–64 season, tied on points with CSM Cluj and CSM Sibiu, and relegated on goal difference.

A comeback followed the next year, winning the North Series of the third division; however, instability marked the second half of the 1960s. Consecutive relegations followed after finishing last in Series II of Divizia B in 1965–66 and 13th in the North Series of Divizia C in 1966–67, eventually dropping to the fourth division.

Arieșul recorded a slight ascent by winning the Mureș Series of the 1967–68 Cluj Regional Championship, earning promotion back to the third division. Over the following years, the club showed steady progress, finishing 7th in Series VI in the 1968–69, 9th in Series VI in 1969–70, and then, under familiar coach Nicolae Szoboszlay, winning Series VII in the 1970–71. However, the club missed out on promotion after the final tournament held in Oradea. In the 1971–72 campaign, Arieșul finished 3rd in Series XI.

The 1972–73 season marked the club’s return to Divizia B under coach Gheorghe Váczi. The squad featured Cocan, Sebeng, Ispas, Ludușan, Popa, Gheorghe Fedeleș, Moș, Pop, Szűcs, Mîlna, Cheta, Ciortea, Deac, Szilaghi, Markiș, Moceanu, Ciocan, Neagu, Cocu, and Hășmășan.

The second-tier campaign lasted four seasons in Series III. In 1973–74, survival was secured narrowly on goal difference with a 14th-place finish. The following season, the club’s name changed to Sticla Turda, reflecting the local glass industry heritage. Improvements followed, with 10th place in 1974–75 and 7th in 1975–76. By 1976–77, however, the team slipped to 15th and was relegated back to Divizia C.

Competing in Series XII of the 1977–78 Divizia C season, the Glassmakers finished 4th, then 3rd in Series IX during the 1978–79 season. The club was runners-up in Series XI in both the 1979–80 and 1980–81 seasons and reached the semifinals of the Cupa României in the 1980–81 season after eliminating three first-division sides: FC Baia Mare (2–1), Sportul Studențesc (2–2, 4–1 on penalties), and Steaua București (0–0, 6–5 on penalties), before losing to Politehnica Timișoara (1–2). The lineup included Vlad – Bâlă, Ludușan, Șumfălean, Hexan – Șipoș, Goștilean (42’, Naghi), Tașnadi – Podar (84’, Botezan) – Pașca, Bakoș. This was followed by a 3rd place finish in 1981–82 and 4th in Series X in the 1982–83 season.

Promotion to Divizia B came after winning Series X in the 1983–84 season. The squad, led by head coach Titus Fărcaș, included Vlad, Enidety, Lupaș, Farkaș, Bâlă, Erman, Pop, Ludușan, Botezan, Borza, Doboș, Bozdoc, Sonica, Tehei, Riza, Bakoș, Nic, R. Rus, V. Rus, Osvadă, Pîrv, Horvath, and Pașca.

== Honours ==
=== Leagues ===
Liga III

- Winners (6): 1964–65, 1970–71, 1972–73, 1983–84, 1986–87, 2006–07
- Runners-up (4): 1979–80, 1980–81, 1998–99, 2001–02

Liga IV – Cluj County

- Winners (3): 1990–91, 1993–94, 2017–18

Cluj Regional Championship

- Winners (3): 1952, 1959–60, 1967–68

=== Cups ===
Cupa României

- Winners (1): 1960–61

Cupa României – Cluj County

- Winners (2): 2017–18, 2023–24

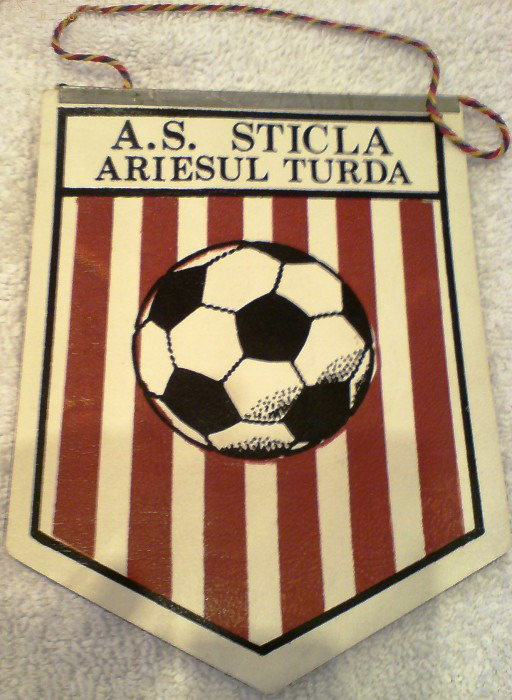
Sticla Arieșul former logo.

Arieșul Turda former logo.

== Chronology of names ==
Name	Period
Muncitorul Turda	1922–1950
Flamura Roșie Turda	1950–1957
Arieșul Turda	1957–1974
Sticla Turda	1974–1979
Sticla Arieșul Turda	1979–1999
Arieșul Turda	1999–2012
FCM Turda	2012–2013
Arieșul Turda	2013–2015
Sticla Arieșul Turda	2016–present

- Note: 1 year of inactivity between 2015 and 2016, and the team was refounded as Sticla Arieșul Turda in the Liga IV.

== League history ==
Season	Tier	Division	Place	Notes	Cupa României
2026–27	4	Liga IV	TBD		Regional phase
2025–26	3	Liga III (Seria VIII)	12th	Relegated	Regional phase
2024–25	4	Liga IV (CJ)	1st (C)	Promoted	Regional phase
2023–24	4	Liga IV (CJ)	4th		Cluj County Winners
2022–23	4	Liga IV (CJ)	9th		Round 1
2021–22	3	Liga III (Seria IX)	10th	Relegated	Round 2
2020–21	3	Liga III (Seria IX)	4th		Round 1
2019–20	3	Liga III (Seria V)	9th		Round 2
2018–19	3	Liga III (Seria V)	7th		Round 2
2017–18	4	Liga IV (CJ)	1st (C)	Promoted	Cluj County Winners
2016–17	4	Liga IV (CJ)	3rd		Regional phase
2014–15	3	Liga III (Seria V)	8th	Relegated	Round 5
2013–14	3	Liga III (Seria V)	7th		Round 4
2012–13	3	Liga III (Seria V)	13th		Round 3
2011–12	2	Liga II (Seria II)	16th	Relegated	Round 5
2010–11	2	Liga II (Seria II)	9th		Round 4
2009–10	2	Liga II (Seria II)	10th		Round 4

Season	Tier	Division	Place	Notes	Cupa României
2008–09	2	Liga II (Seria II)	13th		Round 5
2007–08	2	Liga II (Seria II)	14th		Round 5
2006–07	3	Liga III (Seria V)	1st (C)	Promoted	Round 3
2005–06	3	Divizia C (Seria VIII)	4th		Round 3
2004–05	3	Divizia C (Seria IX)	3rd		Round 2
2003–04	3	Divizia C (Seria IX)	6th		Round 2
2002–03	3	Divizia C (Seria VIII)	9th		Regional phase
2001–02	3	Divizia C (Seria VIII)	2nd		Regional phase
2000–01	3	Divizia C (Seria VII)	11th		Regional phase
1999–00	3	Divizia C (Seria VI)	7th		Regional phase
1998–99	3	Divizia C (Seria IV)	2nd		Regional phase
1997–98	3	Divizia C (Seria IV)	4th		Regional phase
1996–97	3	Divizia C (Seria IV)	10th		Regional phase
1995–96	3	Divizia C (Seria IV)	13th		Regional phase
1994–95	3	Divizia C (Seria IV)	15th		Regional phase
1991–92	3	Divizia C (Seria XI)	8th	Relegated	Regional phase
1990–91	4	County Championship (CJ)	1st (C)	Promoted	Regional phase
1989–90	3	Divizia C (Seria XI)	16th	Relegated	Regional phase

== Notable former players ==
The footballers mentioned below have played at least 1 season for Sticla Arieșul Turda and also played in Liga I for another team.

- (Romania) Valentin Lemnaru
- (Romania) Vasile Suciu
- (Romania) Cosmin Tilincă
- (Romania) Gheorghe Váczi

== Former managers ==
- (Romania) Gheorghe Váczi (1958–1959)
- (Romania) Nicolae Szoboszlay (1959–1961)
- (Romania) Nicolae Szoboszlay (1969–1972)
- (Romania) Constantin Rădulescu (1984–1986)
- (Romania) Sorin Cigan (2006–2007)
- (Romania) Victor Roșca (2007)
- (Romania) Leonida Nedelcu (2007)
- (Romania) Mircea Bolba (2007–2008)
- (Romania) Victor Roșca (2008)
- (Romania) Marin Tudorache (2009–2010)
- (Romania) George Ciorceri (2010–2012)
- (Romania) Dorin Toma (2022–2023)
- (Romania) Ștefan Wetzer
- (Romania) Ioan Tătăran
