= 1989–90 Divizia C =

Third tier Romanian football league

Divizia C
- Season: 1989–90

The 1989–90 Divizia C was the 34th season of Liga III, the third tier of the Romanian football league system.

== Team changes ==
=== To Divizia C ===
Relegated from Divizia B

- Metalul Plopeni
- FEPA 74 Bârlad
- Explorări Câmpulung Moldovenesc
- Delta Tulcea
- Electroputere Craiova
- Dacia Pitești
- Dunărea Călărași
- Metalul Mangalia
- Minerul Cavnic
- Paroșeni Vulcan
- Mecanica Orăștie
- Avântul Reghin

Promoted from County Championship

- Spicul Coteana
- Voința Negrești-Oaș
- Carpați Nehoiu
- Tricotex Panciu
- Mecos București
- Ceramica Jimbolia
- Minerul Ștei
- Mureșul Toplița
- Minerul Crucea
- Tepro Iași
- Gloria Ivești
- Chimia Brăila
- Chimia Găești
- Metalul-Voința Sibiu
- Unirea Dej
- Dacia Orăștie
- Metrom Brașov
- Rapid Fetești
- Dunărea Zimnicea
- Metalul Râmnicu Vâlcea
- Electro Botoșani
- CSM Drobeta-Turnu Severin
- Rapid Braniștea
- Soda Ocna Mureș

=== From Divizia C ===
Promoted to Divizia B

- Foresta Fălticeni
- Viitorul Vaslui
- Olimpia Râmnicu Sărat
- Unirea Slobozia
- Autobuzul București
- Mecanică Fină București
- Constructorul Craiova
- Vagonul Arad
- Mureșul Deva
- IMASA Sfântu Gheorghe
- CFR Cluj
- Someșul Satu Mare

Relegated to County Championship

- Metalul Botoșani
- Celuloza ITA Piatra Neamț
- Victoria CFR Tecuci
- ȘN Galați
- ȘN CSS Tulcea
- ASA Buzău
- Unirea Urziceni
- Victoria Munteni-Buzău
- Petrolul Roata de Jos
- Petrolul Poeni
- Electrica Fieni
- Forestierul Băbeni
- Metalurgistul Sadu
- Termoconstructorul Turnu Severin
- Minerul Oravița
- CFR Victoria Caransebeș
- Textila Cisnădie
- Automatica Mediaș
- Minerul Bălan
- Cimentul Hoghiz
- Lacul Ursu Sovata
- Olimpia Gherla
- Minerul Turț
- Minerul Șuncuiuș

=== Renamed teams ===
Voința ICS Medgidia was renamed as Voința Medgidia.

Metalul Mangalia was renamed as Callatis Mangalia.

Progresul CSȘ Medgidia was renamed as Progresul Medgidia.

Constructorul Șoimii Craiova was renamed as Constructorul Craiova.

Progresul Energia București was renamed as Progresul București.

Sticla Turda was renamed as Sticla Arieșul Turda.

Izomat Șimleu Silvaniei was renamed as Mobila Șimleu Silvaniei.

Victoria Carei was renamed as Victoria Fiut Carei.

Metalul-Voința Sibiu was renamed as Metalul Sibiu.

Chimia Buzău was renamed as Chimica Buzău.

Hidromatica Buzău was renamed as Hidrotehnica Buzău.

CSM Lugoj was renamed as Vulturii Lugoj.

Petrolul FSH Băicoi was renamed as Petrolul Băicoi.

Automatica Reșița was renamed as Automecanica Reșița.

Petrolul Brăila was renamed as Petrolul Ianca Brăila.

Dunăreana Giurgiu was renamed as Dunăreana Giurgiu.

Viitorul CSS Drăgășani was renamed as Viitorul CSS Drăgășani.

Unirea Poiana Câmpina was renamed as Unirea Poiana Câmpina.

=== Other changes ===
ASA Chimia Brazi moved to Ploiești and was renamed to ASA Chimia Ploiești.

Energia Săsciori moved to Sebeș and was renamed to Energia Sebeș.

Autobuzul Voința Odobești moved to Mărășești and was renamed Autobuzul Chimia Mărășești.

== League tables ==
=== Seria I ===
Pos	Team	Pld	W	D	L	GF	GA	GD	Pts	Qualification or relegation
1	Fortus Iași (C, P)	30	19	5	6	75	31	+44	43	Promotion to Divizia B
2	FEPA 74 Bârlad	30	18	5	7	64	20	+44	41	
3	Steaua Mecanică Huși	30	19	3	8	67	38	+29	41	
4	Partizanul Bacău	30	16	4	10	48	38	+10	36	
5	Aurora Târgu Frumos	30	16	2	12	56	54	+2	34	
6	Explorări Câmpulung Moldovenesc	30	16	1	13	55	34	+21	33	
7	Mecanica Vaslui	30	15	3	12	49	41	+8	33	
8	Metalul Rădăuți	30	14	2	14	48	44	+4	30	
9	Constructorul Iași	30	13	3	14	42	31	+11	29	
10	Carpați Gălănești	30	13	2	15	39	39	0	28	
11	CSM Bucecea	30	12	3	15	52	62	−10	27	
12	Unirea Negrești	30	12	2	16	40	54	−14	26	
13	Proletarul Bacău	30	11	1	18	38	59	−21	23	
14	Zimbrul Siret	30	11	1	18	37	74	−37	23	
15	Tepro Iași (R)	30	9	3	18	45	70	−25	21	Relegation to County Championship
16	Electro Botoșani (R)	30	5	2	23	22	88	−66	12	Relegation to County Championship

Source: romaniansoccer.ro
Rules for classification: 1) Points; 2) Goal difference; 3) Number of goals scored.
(C) Champions; (P) Promoted; (R) Relegated

=== Seria II ===
Pos	Team	Pld	W	D	L	GF	GA	GD	Pts	Qualification or relegation
1	CSM Borzești (C, P)	30	15	8	7	47	28	+19	38	Promotion to Divizia B
2	Avântul Reghin	30	15	5	10	53	32	+21	32 (Note: Avântul Reghin deducted 3 points.)	
3	Unirea Cristuru Secuiesc	30	14	4	12	44	47	−3	32	
4	Progresul Odorheiu Secuiesc	30	16	0	14	48	39	+9	32	
5	Petrolul Moinești	30	14	4	12	34	40	−6	32	
6	Minerul Comănești	30	15	2	13	45	48	−3	32	
7	Mureșul Luduș	30	14	4	12	49	52	−3	32	
8	Mecon Gheorghe Gheorghiu-Dej	30	13	4	13	44	44	0	30	
9	Textila Buhuși	30	13	4	13	37	45	−8	30	
10	Mureșul Toplița	30	14	1	15	55	37	+18	29	
11	Metalotehnica Târgu Mureș	30	13	3	14	46	46	0	29	
12	Viitorul Gheorgheni	30	11	6	13	30	48	−18	28	
13	Metalul Reghin	30	12	3	15	44	49	−5	27	
14	Rapid Miercurea Ciuc	30	12	2	16	42	47	−5	26	
15	Metalul Sighișoara (R)	30	9	7	14	28	33	−5	25	Relegation to County Championship
16	Oțelul Reghin (R)	30	9	5	16	37	48	−11	23	Relegation to County Championship

Source: romaniansoccer.ro
Rules for classification: 1) Points; 2) Goal difference; 3) Number of goals scored.
(C) Champions; (P) Promoted; (R) Relegated

=== Seria III ===
Pos	Team	Pld	W	D	L	GF	GA	GD	Pts	Qualification or relegation
1	Gloria CFR Galați (C, P)	30	21	3	6	91	23	+68	45	Promotion to Divizia B
2	Chimia Brăila	30	16	4	10	45	44	+1	36	
3	Mecano-sport Galați	30	15	4	11	52	39	+13	34	
4	Petrolul Ianca Brăila	30	16	2	12	54	40	+14	34	
5	Foresta Gugești	30	14	3	13	50	48	+2	31	
6	Celuloza Adjud	30	14	3	13	34	43	−9	31	
7	Autobuzul Chimia Mărășești	30	12	5	13	36	45	−9	29	
8	Tricotex Panciu	30	13	3	14	40	63	−23	29	
9	Știința Navrom Galați	30	11	6	13	47	43	+4	28	
10	Arrubium Măcin	30	13	2	15	39	42	−3	28	
11	Progresul Brăila	30	11	5	14	42	48	−6	27	
12	Delta Tulcea	30	13	3	14	56	36	+20	27 (Note: Delta Tulcea deducted 2 points.)	
13	Progresul Isaccea	30	13	1	16	38	67	−29	27	
14	Gloria Ivești	30	12	3	15	39	50	−11	27	
15	Granitul Babadag (R)	30	11	5	14	35	46	−11	27	Relegation to County Championship
16	Laminorul Brăila (R)	30	7	4	19	37	58	−21	18	Relegation to County Championship

Source: romaniansoccer.ro
Rules for classification: 1) Points; 2) Goal difference; 3) Number of goals scored.
(C) Champions; (P) Promoted; (R) Relegated

=== Seria IV ===
Pos	Team	Pld	W	D	L	GF	GA	GD	Pts	Qualification or relegation
1	Callatis Mangalia (C, P)	30	22	4	4	67	21	+46	48	Promotion to Divizia B
2	Metalul Plopeni	30	20	3	7	63	24	+39	43	
3	Progresul Medgidia	30	18	5	7	67	28	+39	41	
4	Victoria Florești	30	15	8	7	48	34	+14	38	
5	ISCIP Ulmeni	30	13	3	14	48	45	+3	29	
6	Olimpia Slobozia	30	12	4	14	52	52	0	28	
7	Șantierul Naval Oltenița	30	13	2	15	57	50	+7	28	
8	Dunărea Călărași	30	11	6	13	40	39	+1	28	
9	Portul Constanța	30	11	5	14	50	49	+1	27	
10	Victoria Lehliu	30	13	1	16	42	46	−4	27	
11	Conpref Constanța	30	10	6	14	49	62	−13	26	
12	ASA Chimia Ploiești	30	10	5	15	38	46	−8	25	
13	Viitorul Chirnogi	30	11	2	17	44	68	−24	24	
14	Rapid Fetești	30	9	6	15	36	80	−44	24	
15	Voința Medgidia (R)	30	10	2	18	39	50	−11	22	Relegation to County Championship
16	Victoria Țăndărei (R)	30	10	2	18	30	76	−46	22	Relegation to County Championship

Source: romaniansoccer.ro
Rules for classification: 1) Points; 2) Goal difference; 3) Number of goals scored.
(C) Champions; (P) Promoted; (R) Relegated

=== Seria V ===
Pos	Team	Pld	W	D	L	GF	GA	GD	Pts	Qualification or relegation
1	Progresul București (C, P)	30	18	6	6	57	21	+36	42	Promotion to Divizia B
2	Metalul București	30	17	3	10	70	35	+35	37	
3	Victoria Giurgiu	30	14	6	10	50	40	+10	34	
4	IMGB București	30	14	4	12	42	45	−3	32	
5	Avicola Crevedia	30	14	2	14	46	55	−9	30	
6	Mecos București	30	12	6	12	59	33	+26	30	
7	Mecon București	30	12	6	12	46	43	+3	30	
8	IUPS Chitila	30	14	2	14	42	44	−2	30	
9	Dunăreana Giurgiu	30	14	1	15	33	45	−12	29	
10	Automatica București	30	11	6	13	40	42	−2	28	
11	Tehnometal București	30	10	8	12	47	50	−3	28	
12	Viscofil București	30	12	3	15	54	64	−10	27	
13	Danubiana București	30	12	3	15	50	45	+5	27	
14	CFR BTA București	30	12	2	16	42	66	−24	26	
15	Rapid Braniștea (R)	30	11	3	16	33	66	−33	25	Relegation to County Championship
16	ASIC București (R)	30	9	7	14	36	53	−17	25	Relegation to County Championship

Source: romaniansoccer.ro
Rules for classification: 1) Points; 2) Goal difference; 3) Number of goals scored.
(C) Champions; (P) Promoted; (R) Relegated

=== Seria VI ===
Pos	Team	Pld	W	D	L	GF	GA	GD	Pts	Qualification or relegation
1	Electroputere Craiova (C, P)	30	18	4	8	101	37	+64	40	Promotion to Divizia B
2	ROVA Roșiori	30	14	4	12	57	38	+19	32	
3	Dunărea Zimnicea	30	16	0	14	47	69	−22	32	
4	Unirea Alexandria	30	14	3	13	70	38	+32	31	
5	Progresul Băilești	30	14	3	13	43	42	+1	31	
6	Constructorul Craiova	30	14	2	14	57	45	+12	30	
7	Recolta Stoicănești	30	14	2	14	42	64	−22	30	
8	Progresul Corabia	30	12	5	13	50	56	−6	29	
9	Petrolul Țicleni	30	14	1	15	37	45	−8	29	
10	IOB Balș	30	11	7	12	33	44	−11	29	
11	Chimia Victoria Turnu Măgurele	30	12	4	14	42	48	−6	28	
12	Viitorul CSS Drăgășani	30	12	4	14	59	58	+1	28	
13	SM Drăgănești-Olt	30	12	4	14	43	46	−3	28	
14	Minerul Mătăsari	30	13	2	15	39	48	−9	28	
15	Petrolul Stoina (R)	30	13	2	15	45	66	−21	28	Relegation to County Championship
16	Spicul Coteana (R)	30	10	7	13	39	60	−21	27	Relegation to County Championship

Source: romaniansoccer.ro
Rules for classification: 1) Points; 2) Goal difference; 3) Number of goals scored.
(C) Champions; (P) Promoted; (R) Relegated

=== Seria VII ===
Pos	Team	Pld	W	D	L	GF	GA	GD	Pts	Qualification or relegation
1	IPA Sibiu (C, P)	30	19	5	6	75	29	+46	43	Promotion to Divizia B
2	Electrica Titu	30	17	2	11	70	45	+25	36	
3	Dacia Pitești	30	14	6	10	46	28	+18	34	
4	Metrom Brașov	30	14	5	11	41	27	+14	33	
5	Unirea Pitești	30	13	6	11	49	34	+15	32	
6	CSU-Mecanica Sibiu	30	15	2	13	41	40	+1	32	
7	Electronistul Curtea de Argeș	30	14	2	14	30	42	−12	30	
8	Muscelul Câmpulung	30	14	1	15	32	43	−11	29	
9	Metalul Râmnicu Vâlcea	30	13	2	15	29	61	−32	28	
10	Carpați Mârșa	30	11	6	13	41	46	−5	28	
11	Nitramonia Făgăraș	30	12	4	14	50	43	+7	28	
12	Metalul Sibiu	30	11	5	14	37	46	−9	27	
13	Dacia Cozia Călimănești	30	11	5	14	31	41	−10	27	
14	Chimia Găești	30	12	3	15	33	42	−9	27	
15	Carpați Brașov (R)	30	12	1	17	44	57	−13	25	Relegation to County Championship
16	Carpați Agnita (R)	30	9	3	18	43	68	−25	21	Relegation to County Championship

Source: romaniansoccer.ro
Rules for classification: 1) Points; 2) Goal difference; 3) Number of goals scored.
(C) Champions; (P) Promoted; (R) Relegated

=== Seria VIII ===
Pos	Team	Pld	W	D	L	GF	GA	GD	Pts	Qualification or relegation
1	Montana Sinaia (C, P)	30	18	8	4	71	29	+42	44	Promotion to Divizia B
2	Metalul Filipeștii de Pădure	30	16	4	10	54	34	+20	36	
3	Minerul Filipeștii de Pădure	30	16	3	11	53	37	+16	35	
4	Hidrotehnica Buzău	30	15	4	11	57	47	+10	34	
5	Cimentul Fieni	30	13	6	11	67	42	+25	32	
6	Carpați Covasna	30	15	2	13	39	40	−1	32	
7	Precizia Săcele	30	12	5	13	47	48	−1	29	
8	Unirea Poiana Câmpina	30	13	3	14	36	49	−13	29	
9	Chimica Buzău	30	12	4	14	52	54	−2	28	
10	Metalul Târgu Secuiesc	30	12	4	14	65	48	+17	28	
11	Petrolul Berca	30	13	2	15	40	66	−26	28	
12	Electro Sfântu Gheorghe	30	13	2	15	46	48	−2	28	
13	Minerul Șotânga	30	12	2	16	36	58	−22	26	
14	Minerul Baraolt	30	11	4	15	39	46	−7	26	
15	Carpați Nehoiu (R)	30	10	4	16	35	65	−30	24	Relegation to County Championship
16	Petrolul Băicoi (R)	30	10	1	19	38	64	−26	21	Relegation to County Championship

Source: romaniansoccer.ro
Rules for classification: 1) Points; 2) Goal difference; 3) Number of goals scored.
(C) Champions; (P) Promoted; (R) Relegated

=== Seria IX ===
Pos	Team	Pld	W	D	L	GF	GA	GD	Pts	Qualification or relegation
1	Vulturii Lugoj (C, P)	30	19	3	8	75	28	+47	41	Promotion to Divizia B
2	Minerul Știința Vulcan	30	16	5	9	72	39	+33	37	
3	Minerul Lupeni	30	16	5	9	60	28	+32	37	
4	UM Timișoara	30	17	2	11	61	44	+17	36	
5	Paroșeni Vulcan	30	15	5	10	42	30	+12	35	
6	CSM Caransebeș	30	15	5	10	45	40	+5	35	
7	Minerul Anina	30	14	6	10	47	38	+9	34	
8	AS Sânmartinu Sârbesc	30	16	1	13	50	52	−2	33	
9	Minerul Moldova Nouă	30	13	6	11	43	36	+7	32	
10	Ceramica Jimbolia	30	15	1	14	38	42	−4	31	
11	Automecanica Reșița	30	14	0	16	42	46	−4	28	
12	Dierna Orșova	30	11	5	14	35	46	−11	27	
13	Energia Auto Timișoara	30	10	7	13	39	48	−9	27	
14	Retezatul Hațeg	30	10	6	14	37	54	−17	26	
15	CSM Drobeta-Turnu Severin (R)	30	5	3	22	21	74	−53	13	Relegation to County Championship
16	Mecanizatorul Șimian (R)	30	2	4	24	12	74	−62	8	Relegation to County Championship

Source: romaniansoccer.ro
Rules for classification: 1) Points; 2) Goal difference; 3) Number of goals scored.
(C) Champions; (P) Promoted; (R) Relegated

=== Seria X ===
Pos	Team	Pld	W	D	L	GF	GA	GD	Pts	Qualification or relegation
1	Aurul Brad (C, P)	30	19	3	8	65	25	+40	41	Promotion to Divizia B
2	Dacia Orăștie	30	18	5	7	67	28	+39	41	
3	Înfrățirea Oradea	30	17	3	10	66	30	+36	37	
4	Unirea Sânnicolau Mare	30	15	3	12	45	43	+2	33	
5	Motorul IMA Arad	30	15	2	13	55	51	+4	32	
6	Oțelul Ștei	30	14	3	13	53	52	+1	31	
7	Chimia Tășnad	30	14	2	14	44	53	−9	30	
8	Petrolul Arad	30	15	0	15	53	65	−12	30	
9	Strungul Chișineu-Criș	30	13	4	13	53	51	+2	30	
10	Unirea Tomnatic	30	14	1	15	61	58	+3	29	
11	Minerul Ștei	30	12	5	13	35	36	−1	29	
12	Dacia Mecanica Orăștie	30	14	1	15	50	38	+12	29	
13	CFR Simeria	30	12	2	16	37	52	−15	26	
14	Șoimii Lipova	30	12	2	16	43	67	−24	26	
15	Voința Oradea (R)	30	9	2	19	33	61	−28	20	Relegation to County Championship
16	Gloria Beiuș (R)	30	7	2	21	26	76	−50	16	Relegation to County Championship

Source: romaniansoccer.ro
Rules for classification: 1) Points; 2) Goal difference; 3) Number of goals scored.
(C) Champions; (P) Promoted; (R) Relegated

=== Seria XI ===
Pos	Team	Pld	W	D	L	GF	GA	GD	Pts	Qualification or relegation
1	Metalurgistul Cugir (C, P)	30	20	1	9	83	25	+58	41	Promotion to Divizia B
2	Industria Sârmei Câmpia Turzii	30	15	4	11	47	23	+24	34	
3	Laminorul Victoria Zalău	30	15	2	13	50	48	+2	32	
4	Oașul Negrești-Oaș	30	16	0	14	38	59	−21	32	
5	Voința Negrești-Oaș	30	16	0	14	29	44	−15	32	
6	Victoria Fiut Carei	30	15	2	13	49	39	+10	32	
7	Minerul Băița	30	13	5	12	41	37	+4	31	
8	Minerul Sărmășag	30	14	2	14	43	43	0	30	
9	Unirea Dej	30	14	2	14	47	52	−5	30	
10	CUPROM Baia Mare	30	14	1	15	48	41	+7	29	
11	Metalul Aiud	30	13	3	14	46	39	+7	29	
12	Mobila Șimleu Silvaniei	30	13	3	14	39	57	−18	29	
13	CUG Cluj-Napoca	30	12	4	14	41	38	+3	28	
14	Soda Ocna Mureș	30	12	3	15	35	50	−15	27	
15	Energia Sebeș (R)	30	11	3	16	36	59	−23	25	Relegation to County Championship
16	Sticla Arieșul Turda (R)	30	7	5	18	27	45	−18	19	Relegation to County Championship

Source: romaniansoccer.ro
Rules for classification: 1) Points; 2) Goal difference; 3) Number of goals scored.
(C) Champions; (P) Promoted; (R) Relegated

=== Seria XII ===
Pos	Team	Pld	W	D	L	GF	GA	GD	Pts	Qualification or relegation
1	CIL Sighetu Marmației (C, P)	30	18	4	8	72	27	+45	40	Promotion to Divizia B
2	Minerul Baia Sprie	30	15	3	12	66	37	+29	33	
3	Relonul Săvinești	30	14	4	12	41	42	−1	32	
4	Laminorul Beclean	30	13	6	11	45	49	−4	32	
5	Minerul Gura Humorului	30	14	3	13	43	41	+2	31	
6	Minerul Cavnic	30	14	2	14	67	48	+19	30	
7	Minerul Baia Borșa	30	14	2	14	48	50	−2	30	
8	Metalul Roman	30	14	1	15	44	34	+10	29	
9	Bradul Vișeu de Sus	30	14	1	15	35	53	−18	29	
10	Steaua Minerul Vatra Dornei	30	12	4	14	50	48	+2	28	
11	Chimia Năsăud	30	12	4	14	40	55	−15	28	
12	Avântul Frasin	30	13	2	15	24	48	−24	28	
13	Mecanica Bistrița	30	13	2	15	52	39	+13	28	
14	Cetatea Târgu Neamț	30	13	2	15	37	42	−5	28	
15	Minerul Crucea (R)	30	13	2	15	34	67	−33	28	Relegation to County Championship
16	Laminorul Roman (R)	30	12	2	16	35	53	−18	26	Relegation to County Championship

Source: romaniansoccer.ro
Rules for classification: 1) Points; 2) Goal difference; 3) Number of goals scored.
(C) Champions; (P) Promoted; (R) Relegated

== See also ==
- 1989–90 Divizia A
- 1989–90 Divizia B
- 1989–90 Cupa României
