= Constantin Dimitrescu =

Romanian classic composer

Constantin Dimitrescu (Romanian pronunciation: [konstanˈtin dimiˈtresku]; 19 March 1847 in Blejoi, Romania – 9 May 1928) was a Romanian classic composer and music teacher, one of the most prominent representatives of the late Romantic period.

== Background ==
Born in Blejoi, Prahova County, he was taken to Bucharest at an early age, once his musical talent was recognized. There he studied cello and composition with some of Romania's best-known music teachers. Funds were subsequently made available for him to continue his education in Vienna and then later in Paris where he studied with, among others, the famous cello virtuoso Auguste Franchomme.

== Musical work ==
Upon his return to Bucharest, he became principal cellist of the Bucharest Philharmonic and also of the National Theatre Orchestra. In later years, he served as conductor for both. He was also engaged as a professor at the Bucharest Conservatory, where one of his students was George Georgescu, later to become an important conductor after a hand injury forced him to abandon a successful career as a cellist.

Despite his many occupations and duties, Dimitrescu found time to compose orchestral and operatic works as well as chamber music. In fact, it was his great love of chamber music which led him to found Bucharest's first permanent string quartet. He served as its cellist for many years. Thus it comes as no surprise to find that throughout his long musical life, Dimitrescu composed string quartets, seven in all.

- Serenada română (Romanian Serenade) for cello and piano, Op. 9
- Dans țărănesc (Peasants Dance; also known as "Rustic Dance") for cello and piano, Op. 15
- String Quartet No. 1 in G major, Op. 21
- String Quartet No. 2 in D minor, Op. 26
- String Quartet No. 3 in B♭ major, Op. 33
- String Quartet No. 4 in G minor, Op. 38
- String Quartet No. 5 in F major, Op. 42 (published 1890)
- Concerto No. 1 for cello and orchestra
- Concerto No. 2 for cello and orchestra
- Sergentul Cartuș, Opera (1883)
- Renegatu, Opera (1886)
- Sanda, Opera (1886)
- Nini, Comic Opera in 3 acts (1897); premiered 1898 in Bucarest; libretto by Dimitrie Ionescu-Zane
- Sănziana şi Pepelea, Musical Fairytale in 5 Acts (1899); premiered 1899 in Bucarest; libretto by Vasile Alecsandri
