= Turda Municipal Stadium =

Sporting venue in Romania

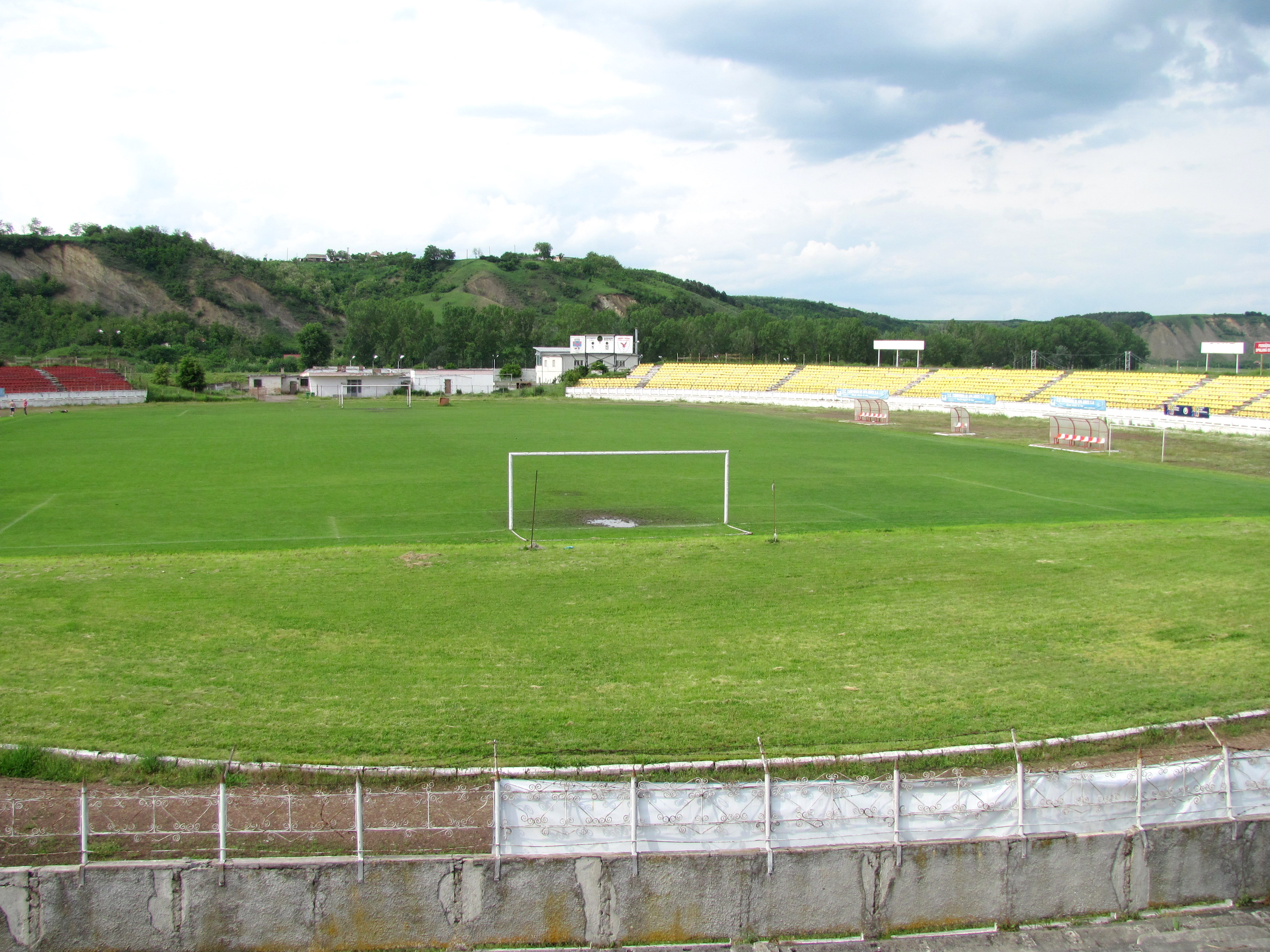
- The venue in 2010
- Interactive map of Turda Municipal Stadium
- Former names: Arieșul Stadium
- Address: Str. Stadionului
- Location: Turda, Romania
- Coordinates: 46°33′47″N 23°49′25″E
- Owner: Municipality of Turda
- Operator: Sticla Arieşul Turda
- Capacity: 10,000 (8,500 seated)
- Surface: Grass

Construction
- Opened: 1975
- Renovated: 2006–2007

Tenant
- Sticla Arieşul Turda (1975–present)

The Turda Municipal Stadium is a multi-use stadium in Turda, Romania. It is currently used mostly for football matches and is the home ground of Sticla Arieşul Turda. The stadium holds 10,000 people, of which 8,500 are seated.

The venue is a state of degradation.

== Gallery ==
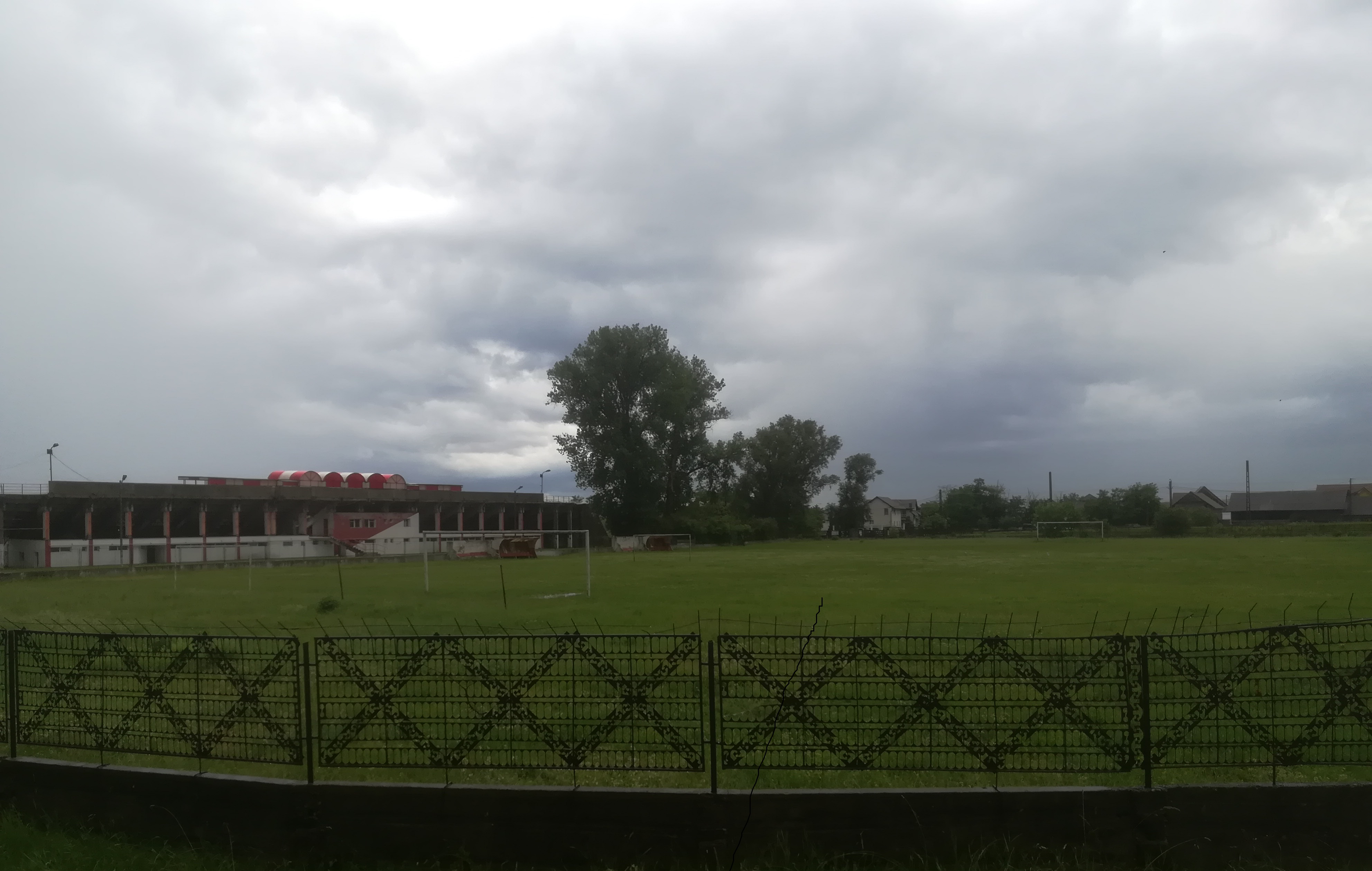
Exterior view of the stadium.

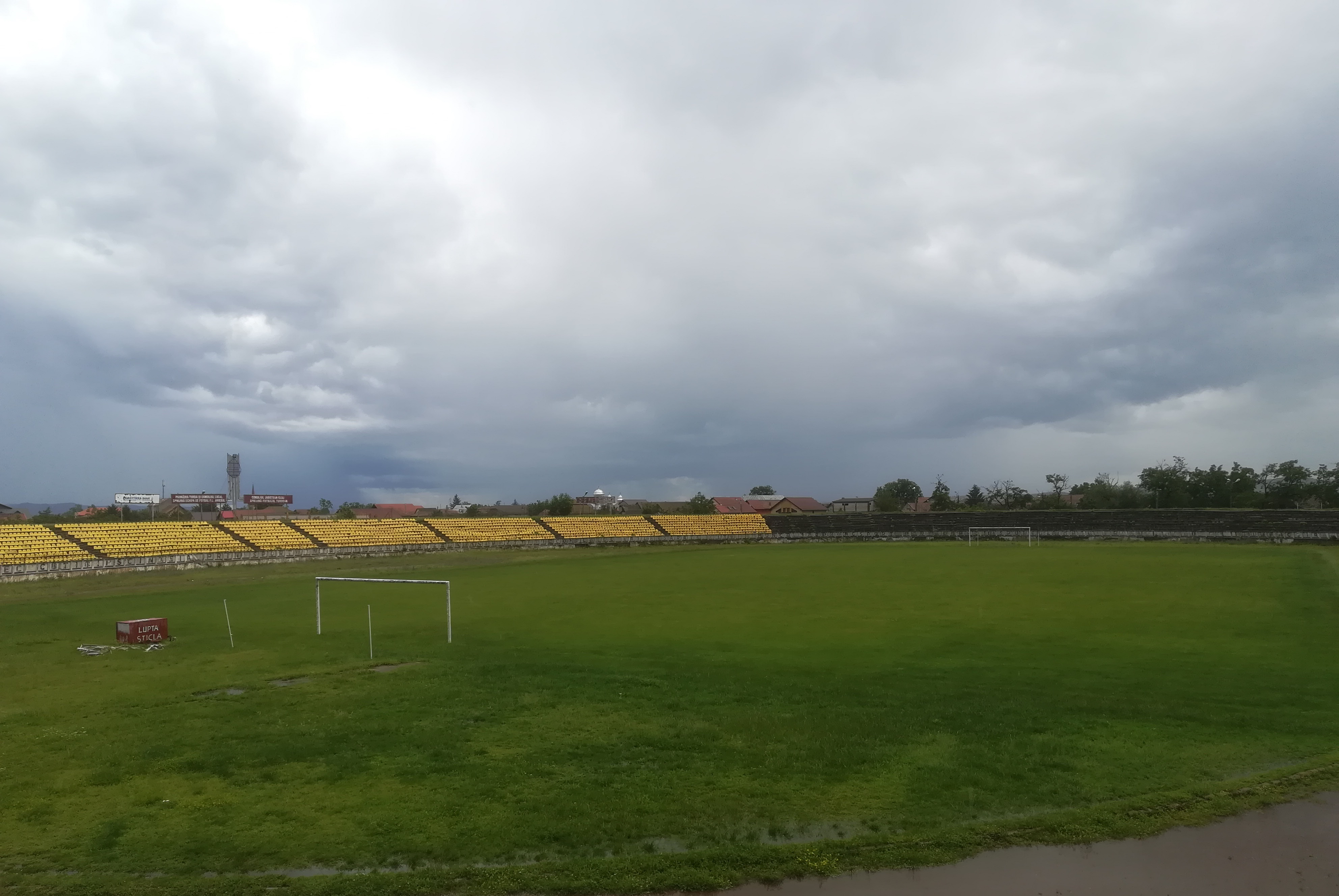
View of 2nd Stand and South End.

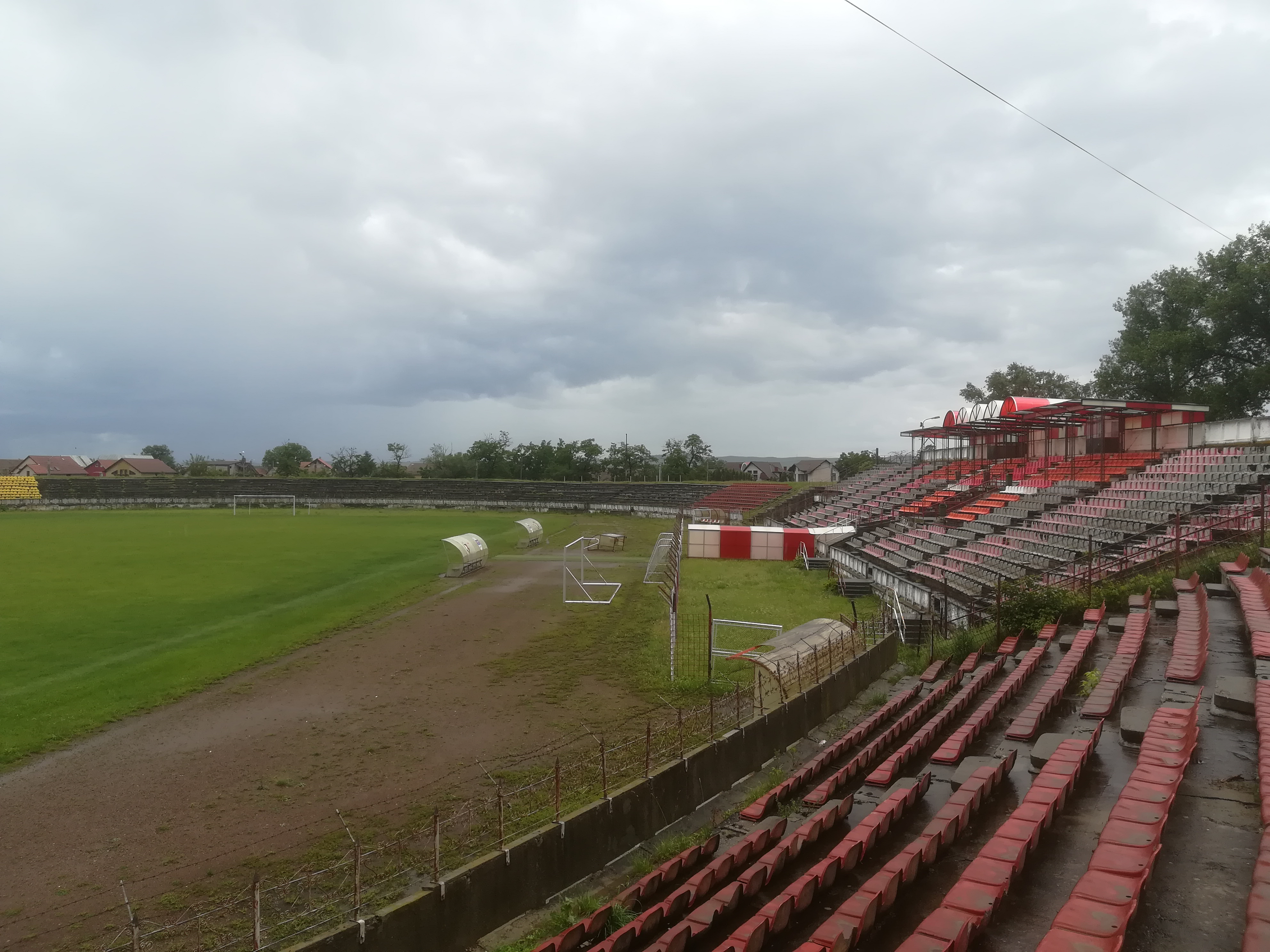
View of Main Stand.
