= 1990–91 County Championship =

49th season of the Liga IV, the fourth tier of the Romanian football league

Liga IV
- Season: 1990–91

The 1990–91 County Championship was the 49th season of the Liga IV, the fourth tier of the Romanian football league system. The champions of each county association played against those from neighboring counties in a play-off to gain promotion to Divizia C.

== County leagues ==
- Alba (AB)
- Arad (AR)
- Argeș (AG)
- Bacău (BC)
- Bihor (BH)
- Bistrița-Năsăud (BN)
- Botoșani (BT)
- Brașov (BV)
- Brăila (BR)
- Bucharest (B)
- Buzău (BZ)
- Caraș-Severin (CS)
- Călărași (CL)
- Cluj (CJ)
- Constanța (CT)
- Covasna (CV)
- Dâmbovița (DB)
- Dolj (DJ)
- Galați (GL)
- Giurgiu (GR)
- Gorj (GJ)
- Harghita (HR)
- Hunedoara (HD)
- Ialomița (IL)
- Iași (IS)
- Ilfov (IF)
- Maramureș (MM)
- Mehedinți (MH)
- Mureș (MS)
- Neamț (NT)
- Olt (OT)
- Prahova (PH)
- Satu Mare (SM)
- Sălaj (SJ)
- Sibiu (SB)
- Suceava (SV)
- Teleorman (TR)
- Timiș (TM)
- Tulcea (TL)
- Vaslui (VS)
- Vâlcea (VL)
- Vrancea (VN)

== Promotion play-off ==
Teams promoted to Divizia C without play-off matches, from underrepresented counties in the third division.

- (MH) CSM Drobeta-Turnu Severin
- (SV) Minerul Crucea
- (TL) Granitul Babadag
- (GR) Petrolul Roata de Jos
- (SB) Universitatea Hidrocon Sibiu
- (OT) Constructorul Slatina

The matches were played on 30 June and 7 July 1991.

Team 1	Agg.	Team 2	1st leg	2nd leg
CPL Arad (AR)	4–1	(BH) Minerul Voivozi	2–1	2–0
Steaua Electrica Fieni (DB)	5–3	(TR) Petrolul Videle	3–0	2–3
Forestierul Băbeni (VL)	2–7	(DJ) Autobuzul IJTL Craiova	2–2	0–5
Laminorul Roman (NT)	4–2	(HR) Metalul Vlăhița	3–0	1–2
Rulmentul Bârlad (VS)	1–6	(GL) Șantierul Naval Galați	1–2	0–4
Metalul Oțelu Roșu (CS)	0–4	(TM) Auto FZB Timișoara	0–0	0–4
Ardudeana Ardud (SM)	4–1	(MM) Minerul Băiuț	4–0	0–1
Rapid CFR Teiuș (AB)	3–4	(HD) Parângul Lonea	3–1	0–3
Metalul Sighișoara (MS)	1–4	(CJ) Sticla Arieșul Turda	1–0	0–4
Avîntul Catalina (CV)	4–6	(PH) Unirea Urlați	3–1	1–5
Carpați Nehoiu (BZ)	2–3	(BV) Carpați Brașov	1–0	1–3
Energia Vulturu (VN)	1–6	(BC) CPL Bacău	1–1	0–5
CFR Constanța (CT)	1–0	(BR) Laminorul Brăila	1–0	0–0
Victoria Țăndărei (IL)	2–6	(B) Calculatorul București	2–3	0–3
Minerul Rodna (BN)	3–4	(SJ) Rapid Jibou	2–0	1–4
Rapid Pitești (AG)	2–2 (6–7 p)	(GJ) Petrolul Târgu Cărbunești	2–0	0–2
Tepro Iași (IS)	5–3	(BT) Metalul Botoșani	3–0	2–3
Sportul IACMRS Călărași (CL)	4–1	(IF) Șoimii IEM Otopeni	2–0	2–1

== Championship standings ==
=== Arad County ===
Championship play-off

The championship play-off was played between the two best-ranked teams in the two series.

Semi-finals

The matches were played on 9 June 1991 at Strungul Stadium in Arad.

Team 1	Score	Team 2
CPL Arad	2–0	Blănarul Arad
Olimpia ISD Arad	3–1	Șoimii Pâncota

Final

The match took place on 16 June 1991 at Strungul Stadium in Arad.

Team 1	Score	Team 2
CPL Arad	2–0	Olimpia ISD Arad

CPL Arad won the Arad County Championship and qualify to promotion play-off in Divizia C.

=== Caraș-Severin County ===
Pos	Team	Pld	W	D	L	GF	GA	GD	Pts	Qualification or relegation
1	Metalul Oțelu Roșu (C, Q)	24	18	3	3	52	14	+38	39	Qualification to promotion play-off
2	Minerul Oravița	24	19	0	5	75	20	+55	38	
3	Foresta Caransebeș	24	15	2	7	54	24	+30	32	
4	Nera Bozovici	24	15	2	7	58	31	+27	32	
5	Muncitorul Reșița	24	14	3	7	52	31	+21	31	
6	ICM Reșița	24	8	5	11	39	35	+4	21	
7	Hercules ACH Băile Herculane	24	8	4	12	27	45	−18	20	
8	Autoforesta Bocșa	24	8	4	12	33	59	−26	20	
9	Metalul Topleț	24	8	3	13	35	47	−12	19	
10	Unirea Grădinari	24	7	5	12	35	62	−27	19	
11	Foresta Zăvoi	24	6	6	12	23	43	−20	18	
12	Energia Caransebeș	24	7	1	16	31	66	−35	15	
13	Minerul Ocna de Fier	24	3	2	19	19	57	−38	8	
14	Mecanizatorul Bocșa (Note: Mecanizatorul Bocșa, Minerul Berzasca and Voința Ciudanovița withdrew in the first part of the season and all their results were canceled.) (D)	0	0	0	0	0	0	0	0	Withdrew
15	Minerul Berzasca (D)	0	0	0	0	0	0	0	0	Withdrew
16	Voința Ciudanovița (D)	0	0	0	0	0	0	0	0	Withdrew

Rules for classification: 1) Points; 2) Goal difference; 3) Number of goals scored.
(C) Champions; (D) Disqualified; (Q) Qualified for the phase indicated

=== Galați County ===
Pos	Team	Pld	W	D	L	GF	GA	GD	Pts	Qualification or relegation
1	Șantierul Naval Galați (C, Q)	30	25	3	2	144	19	+125	53	Qualification to promotion play-off
2	Hidraulic Galați	30	20	8	2	82	30	+52	48	
3	Bujorii Târgu Bujor	30	17	2	11	81	57	+24	36	
4	Specialistul Tudor Vladimirescu	30	16	4	10	68	65	+3	36	
5	Avântul Matca	30	16	3	11	78	48	+30	35	
6	Metalosport Galați	30	14	6	10	52	42	+10	34	
7	Recolta Munteni	30	14	3	13	66	84	−18	31	
8	Rapid Șendreni	30	13	2	15	54	74	−20	28	
9	Voința Șivița	30	11	5	14	52	68	−16	27	
10	Petrolul Țepu	30	12	3	15	51	85	−34	27	
11	Avântul Liești	30	10	6	14	57	66	−9	26	
12	Aurul Slobozia Conachi	30	12	2	16	69	79	−10	26	
13	Automobilul Galați	30	9	6	15	51	67	−16	24	
14	Voința Cișmele	30	9	5	16	55	77	−22	23	
15	Știința ICPPAM Galați	30	8	1	21	53	92	−39	17	
16	Prutul Vlădești	30	3	3	24	20	83	−63	9	

Rules for classification: 1) Points; 2) Goal difference; 3) Number of goals scored.
(C) Champions; (Q) Qualified for the phase indicated

=== Maramureș County ===
Pos	Team	Pld	W	D	L	GF	GA	GD	Pts	Qualification or relegation
1	Minerul Băiuț (C, Q)	24	17	4	3	71	16	+55	38	Qualification to promotion play-off
2	IPIC-CF Șomcuta Mare	24	14	2	8	45	27	+18	30	
3	Mecanica Sighetu Marmației	24	12	5	7	47	29	+18	29	
4	Electrica Baia Mare	24	13	3	8	47	38	+9	29	
5	Tractorul Satulung	24	13	2	9	49	31	+18	28	
6	Metalul Bogdan Vodă	24	14	0	10	50	47	+3	28	
7	Maramureșana Sighetu Marmației	24	12	3	9	46	30	+16	27	
8	Viitorul Ocna Șugatag	24	11	1	12	43	67	−24	23	
9	Voința Poienile de sub Munte	24	9	3	12	46	56	−10	21	
10	Victoria FNC Baia Mare	24	9	1	14	40	63	−23	19	
11	Voința Târgu Lăpuș	24	8	2	14	20	34	−14	18	
12	Antena Baia Mare	24	6	4	14	41	51	−10	16	
13	Sticla Ulmeni (Note: Sticla Ulmeni excluded in the second part of the season for three non-show ups and lost all remaining matches with 0–3.)	24	3	0	21	14	70	−56	6	
14	Olimpia Baia Mare (Note: Olimpia Baia Mare withdrew in the first part of the season and all its results were canceled.) (D)	0	0	0	0	0	0	0	0	Withdrew

Rules for classification: 1) Points; 2) Goal difference; 3) Number of goals scored.
(C) Champions; (D) Disqualified; (Q) Qualified for the phase indicated

=== Mureș County ===
Pos	Team	Pld	W	D	L	GF	GA	GD	Pts	Qualification or relegation
1	Metalul Sighișoara (C, Q)	34	23	5	6	77	25	+52	51	Qualification to promotion play-off
2	Sticla Târnaveni	34	22	4	8	73	34	+39	48	
3	TCMRIC Târgu Mureș	34	20	3	11	65	50	+15	43	
4	Gaz Metan Târgu Mureș	34	20	3	11	56	43	+13	43	
5	Oțelul Reghin	34	18	5	11	72	30	+42	41	
6	Victoria Sărățeni	34	19	3	12	55	41	+14	41	
7	Voința Miercurea Nirajului	34	17	7	10	47	34	+13	41	
8	IRA Târgu Mureș	34	17	6	11	63	50	+13	40	
9	Energia Iernut	34	16	7	11	72	39	+33	39	
10	Lacul Ursu Mobila Sovata	34	14	6	14	53	50	+3	34	
11	Târnava Sighișoara	34	15	2	17	49	64	−15	32	
12	Voința Sângeorgiu de Pădure	34	14	2	18	54	62	−8	30	
13	IMATEX Târgu Mureș	34	13	4	17	36	46	−10	30	
14	Piscicola Zau	34	12	6	16	43	58	−15	30	
15	ILEFOR Târgu Mureș	34	11	4	19	41	48	−7	26	
16	Viitorul Prodcomplex Târgu Mureș	34	5	3	26	25	100	−75	13	
17	Transportul Târgu Mureș (R)	34	5	2	27	21	83	−62	12	Relegation to Mureș County Championship II
18	Faianța Sighișoara (R)	34	5	2	27	14	77	−63	12	Relegation to Mureș County Championship II

Rules for classification: 1) Points; 2) Goal difference; 3) Number of goals scored.
(C) Champions; (Q) Qualified for the phase indicated; (R) Relegated

=== Neamț County ===
Pos	Team	Pld	W	D	L	GF	GA	GD	Pts	Qualification or relegation
1	Laminorul Roman (C, Q)	24	19	2	3	71	14	+57	38 (Note: Laminorul Roman, Voința Piatra Neamț and Energia Săbăoani were deducted 2 points.)	Qualification to promotion play-off
2	Cimentul Bicaz	24	12	5	7	48	31	+17	29	
3	Bradul Roznov	24	14	1	9	48	31	+17	29	
4	Mobila Târgu Neamț	24	12	2	10	52	30	+22	26	
5	Voința Piatra Neamț	24	12	2	10	45	43	+2	24	
6	AZO-TCM Săvinești	24	11	2	11	36	55	−19	24	
7	Celuloza ITA Piatra Neamț	24	9	4	11	48	51	−3	22	
8	IM Piatra Neamț	24	10	2	12	47	56	−9	22	
9	Viitorul Podoleni	24	9	3	12	35	50	−15	21	
10	Voința Cauciucul Târgu Neamț	24	11	4	9	37	38	−1	18 (Note: Voința Cauciucul Târgu Neamț deducted 8 points.)	
11	Energia Săbăoani	24	8	2	14	46	60	−14	16	
12	Rapid Piatra Neamț	24	7	2	15	31	58	−27	16	
13	CPL Piatra Neamț (Note: CPL Piatra Neamț withdrew in the second part of the season and lost all remaining matches with 0–3.) (D)	24	5	3	16	23	50	−27	13	Excluded
14	Transformatorul Roman (Note: Transformatorul Roman was excluded in the first part of the season and all its results were canceled.) (D)	0	0	0	0	0	0	0	0	Excluded

Rules for classification: 1) Points; 2) Goal difference; 3) Number of goals scored.
(C) Champions; (D) Disqualified; (Q) Qualified for the phase indicated

=== Olt County ===
Championship final

Team 1	Score	Team 2
Constructorul Slatina	2–1	Oltețul Osica

Constructorul Slatina won the Olt County Championship and qualify to promotion play-off in Divizia C.

=== Prahova County ===
Teams changes from previous season

Relegated from Divizia C

- Petrolul Băicoi

Promoted to Divizia C

- Carpați Sinaia

Promoted from Prahova County Championship II

- Electromecanica Crângul lui Bot (Winners)
- Metalul Vălenii de Munte (Runners-up)

Relegated to Prahova County Championship II

- Vulturul Băicoi (17th place)
- Feroemail Ploiești (18th place)

Other changes

- Rafinorul Ploiești was renamed Astra Ploiești.
- AEI Urlați was renamed Unirea Dealu Mare Urlați.
- Electromontaj Câmpina merged with Energia Câmpina to form Electromecanica Câmpina.
- Caraimanul Bușteni merged with Divizia B side Montana Sinaia to form Montana Caraimanul Bușteni and take its place in the second division.
- PECO Ploiești took the of Caraimanul Bușteni.

Pos	Team	Pld	W	D	L	GF	GA	GD	Pts	Qualification or relegation
1	Unirea Dealu Mare Urlați (C, Q)	34	24	5	5	72	30	+42	53	Qualification to promotion play-off
2	Petrolistul Boldești	34	23	3	8	65	29	+36	49	
3	Astra Ploiești	34	20	8	6	102	48	+54	48	
4	Vega Ploiești	34	21	5	8	68	37	+31	47	
5	Petrolul Băicoi	34	20	5	9	86	28	+58	43 (Note: Petrolul Băicoi deducted 2 points.)	
6	Chimistul Valea Călugărească	34	18	6	10	69	41	+28	42	
7	Metalul Vălenii de Munte	34	16	7	11	48	31	+17	39	
8	Geamul Scăeni	34	16	6	12	43	49	−6	38	
9	PECO Ploiești	34	16	5	13	50	44	+6	37	
10	Electromecanica Crângul lui Bot	34	12	7	15	56	53	+3	31	
11	Precizia Breaza (R)	34	12	6	16	51	62	−11	30	Relegation to Prahova County Championship II
12	Carotajul Ploiești (R)	34	12	5	17	44	45	−1	29	Relegation to Prahova County Championship II
13	Avântul Măneciu (R)	34	11	6	17	50	51	−1	28	Relegation to Prahova County Championship II
14	Energia Bucov (R)	34	11	3	20	45	72	−27	25	Relegation to Prahova County Championship II
15	IUC Ploiești (R)	34	10	4	20	51	69	−18	24	Relegation to Prahova County Championship II
16	Electromecanica Câmpina (R)	34	9	5	20	53	91	−38	19 (Note: Electromecanica Câmpina and Viitorul Pleașa were deducted 4 points.)	Relegation to Prahova County Championship II
17	Oțelul Câmpina (Note: Oțelul Câmpina withdrew before the start of the second half of the season.) (R)	34	6	4	24	14	69	−55	16	Relegation to Prahova County Championship II
18	Viitorul Pleașa (R)	34	3	2	29	27	163	−136	4	Relegation to Prahova County Championship II

Rules for classification: 1) Points; 2) Goal difference; 3) Number of goals scored.
(C) Champions; (Q) Qualified for the phase indicated; (R) Relegated

=== Sibiu County ===
Series I

Pos	Team	Pld	W	D	L	GF	GA	GD	Pts	Qualification or relegation
1	Universitatea Hidrocon Sibiu (Q)	22	16	3	3	61	20	+41	35	Qualification to championship final
2	Bumbacul Cisnădie	22	14	4	4	57	14	+43	32	
3	Firul Roșu Tălmaciu	22	14	3	5	56	27	+29	31	
4	Unirea Ocna Sibiului	22	13	4	5	52	21	+31	30	
5	Construcții Sibiu	22	13	4	5	41	20	+21	30	
6	Electrica Sibiu	22	9	5	8	30	36	−6	23	
7	Sticla Avrig	22	7	2	13	38	58	−20	16	
8	CFR-IUPS Sibiu	22	6	3	13	48	66	−18	15	
9	Cibinul Cristian	22	7	1	14	41	73	−32	15	
10	Tractorul Sibiu	22	5	4	13	29	49	−20	14	
11	Textila Cisnădie	22	4	5	13	23	49	−26	13	
12	Progresul Orlat	22	3	4	15	20	63	−43	10	

Rules for classification: 1) Points; 2) Head-to-head points; 3) Head-to-head goal difference; 4) Head-to-head goals scored; 5) Head-to-head away goals scored; 6) Goal difference; 7) Goals scored.
(Q) Qualified for the phase indicated

Series II

Pos	Team	Pld	W	D	L	GF	GA	GD	Pts	Qualification or relegation
1	Vitrometan Mediaș (C, Q)	22	17	3	2	73	15	+58	37	Qualification to championship final
2	Carbomet Copșa Mică	22	15	5	2	54	15	+39	35	
3	Automecanica Mediaș	22	14	2	6	59	26	+33	30	
4	Relee Mediaș	22	12	5	5	35	14	+21	29	
5	ITA-Geamuri Mediaș	22	12	4	6	51	23	+28	28	
6	Record Mediaș	22	11	5	6	50	33	+17	27	
7	Sparta Mediaș	22	8	6	8	47	22	+25	22	
8	Textila Mediaș	22	6	4	12	23	42	−19	16	
9	Spicul Șeica Mare	22	5	3	14	21	68	−47	13	
10	Progresul Dumbrăveni	22	4	3	15	27	72	−45	11	
11	Mecanica Mediaș	22	3	2	17	14	59	−45	8	
12	Visa Agârbiciu	22	4	0	18	19	84	−65	8	

Rules for classification: 1) Points; 2) Head-to-head points; 3) Head-to-head goal difference; 4) Head-to-head goals scored; 5) Head-to-head away goals scored; 6) Goal difference; 7) Goals scored.
(C) Champions; (Q) Qualified for the phase indicated

Championship final

Team 1	Score	Team 2
Universitatea Hidrocon Sibiu	1–0	Vitrometan Mediaș

Universitatea Hidrocon Sibiu won the Sibiu County Championship and qualify to promotion play-off in Divizia C.

== See also ==
- 1990–91 Divizia A
- 1990–91 Divizia B
- 1990–91 Divizia C
- 1990–91 Cupa României
