= Mihai Constantinescu (footballer) =

Romanian footballer (born 2002)

Personal information
- Full name: Mihai Alexandru Constantinescu
- Date of birth: 10 October 2002 (age 24)
- Place of birth: Ploiești, Romania
- Height: 1.81 m (5 ft 11 in)
- Position: Central midfielder

Team information
- Current team: Blejoi
- Number: 14

Youth career
- –2019: Petrolul Ploiești

Senior career*
Years	Team	Apps	(Gls)
2019–2024	Petrolul Ploiești	49	(2)
2022–2023	→ Concordia Chiajna (loan)	15	(1)
2024–	Blejoi	14	(2)
- * Club domestic league appearances and goals as of 17:14, 26 December 2024 (UTC)

Mihai Alexandru Constantinescu (born 10 October 2002) is a Romanian professional footballer who plays as a central midfielder for CS Blejoi.

== Club career ==
Constantinescu made his professional debut for his boyhood club Petrolul Ploiești on 6 August 2023, in a 3–2 Liga I win to Farul Constanța.

== Honours ==
Petrolul Ploiești

- Liga II: 2021–22
