= 1970–71 Divizia C =

Third tier Romanian football league

Divizia C
- Season: 1970–71
- Dates: 24 August 1970 – 17 June 1971
- Country: Romania
- Teams: 128
- Matches: 1,920
- Goals: 5,067 (2.64 per match)
- Biggest home win: Vulturii Lugoj 9–0 Electromotor (14 April 1971); Carpați Brașov 9–0 Torpedo (13 September 1970)
- Biggest away win: Dermata 0–5 Arieșul Turda (6 June 1971)
- Highest scoring: Minobrad 7–3 Fulgerul (10 March 1971); Șoimii 5–5 Muncitorul (13 June 1971); Gherla 9–1 Someșul B. (6 June 1971); Tractorul 8–2 Unirea C.S. (7 March 1971)
- Longest winning run: 8 matches Chimia Făgăraș
- Longest unbeaten run: 15 matches Metalul Plopeni
- Longest winless run: 16 matches Muncitorul Tecuci
- Longest losing run: 9 matches Someșul Beclean; Unirea Cristuru Secuiesc

The 1970–71 Divizia C was the 15th season of Liga III, the third tier of the Romanian football league system.

The format was maintained with eight series, each consisting of 16 teams. At the end of the season, the winners of each series qualified for the Divizia B promotion play-off, from which four teams were promoted, while no teams were relegated, as Divizia C was expanded to twelve series of 14 teams each for the following season.

== Team changes ==
=== To Divizia C ===
Relegated from Divizia B

- Chimia Suceava
- Gloria Bârlad
- Chimia Râmnicu Vâlcea
- Metalul Turnu Severin

Promoted from County Championship

- Cimentul Bicaz
- ITA Pașcani
- Olimpia Râmnicu Sărat
- Unirea Tricolor Brăila
- Energia Slobozia
- Vulturul Tulcea
- Victoria Florești
- FC Caracal
- Lotru Brezoi
- Minerul Moldova Nouă
- Unirea Alba Iulia
- CFR Simeria
- Minerul Baia Sprie
- Someșul Beclean
- CFR Sighișoara
- Forestierul Târgu Secuiesc

=== From Divizia C ===
Promoted to Divizia B

- Șantierul Naval Oltenița
- CFR Pașcani
- UM Timișoara
- Gloria Bistrița

Relegated to County Championship

- Constructorul Piatra Neamț
- Foresta Ciurea
- Dunărea Brăila
- Locomotiva Adjud
- ITC Constanța
- ICAB Arcuda
- Unirea Câmpulung
- Progresul Balș
- Progresul Strehaia
- Unirea Orșova
- Tehnofrig Cluj-Napoca
- Minerul Baia de Arieș
- Bihoreana Marghita
- Dacia Oradea
- Medicina Târgu Mureș
- Avântul Reghin

=== Other changes ===
- Gloria Bârlad was moved from Bârlad to Slatina and was renamed Gloria Slatina.
- Unirea Focșani was renamed Automobilul Focșani.
- Chimia Gheorghe Gheorghiu-Dej was renamed Trotușul Gheorghe Gheorghiu-Dej.
- Unirea Mânăstirea was moved from Mânăstirea to București and was renamed Unirea București.
- Sportul Muncitoresc București was renamed TMB București.
- Victoria Târgu Jiu was renamed Pandurii Târgu Jiu.
- Dinamo Zalău was renamed Unirea Zalău.
- Metalul Salonta was renamed Recolta Salonta.
- Foresta Năsăud was renamed Progresul Năsăud.
- Energia Slobozia was renamed Azotul Slobozia
- Vulturul Tulcea and Dunărea Tulcea merged, the first one absorbed the second one and was renamed Dunărea Tulcea.
- Topitorul Baia Mare was replaced by Gloria Baia Mare.
- Gloria CFR Galați was dissolved and instead was formed FC Galați who took the place in Divizia B from Oțelul Galați.
- Dacia Galați took the place of dissolved Gloria CFR Galați.
- MEVA Drobeta-Turnu Severin took the place of Energetica Drobeta-Turnu Severin.

== League tables ==
=== Series I ===
==== League table ====
Pos	Team	Pld	W	D	L	GF	GA	GD	Pts	Promotion or relegation
1	Chimia Suceava (C)	30	19	4	7	58	17	+41	42	Qualification to promotion play-off
2	Victoria Roman	30	14	7	9	54	34	+20	35	
3	Minerul Comănești	30	15	5	10	45	26	+19	35	
4	Petrolul Moinești	30	15	4	11	39	33	+6	34	
5	Cimentul Bicaz	30	15	4	11	48	43	+5	34	
6	Foresta Fălticeni	30	14	4	12	38	41	−3	32	
7	Minerul Gura Humorului	30	12	7	11	47	36	+11	31	
8	Rarăul Câmpulung Moldovenesc	30	13	3	14	37	33	+4	29	
9	Nicolina Iași	30	10	9	11	37	40	−3	29	
10	ITA Pașcani	30	12	5	13	45	50	−5	29	
11	Penicilina Iași	30	11	5	14	33	44	−11	27	
12	Textila Botoșani	30	11	5	14	29	41	−12	27	
13	Minobrad Vatra Dornei	30	12	2	16	42	58	−16	26	
14	Letea Bacău	30	10	5	15	43	49	−6	25	
15	Textila Buhuși	30	10	5	15	41	53	−12	25	Spared from relegation
16	Fulgerul Dorohoi	30	8	4	18	41	79	−38	20	Spared from relegation

Source: romaniansoccer.ro
(C) Champions

==== Results ====
Home \ Away	CHI	VRO	MCO	PET	CBI	FOR	MGH	RAR	NIC	ITA	PEN	TBO	MVD	LET	TBU	FUL
Chimia Suceava		4–0	1–0	1–0	3–0	3–1	4–0	2–0	3–0	3–0	4–0	2–1	3–1	3–0	5–0	3–1
Victoria Roman	3–2		3–0	3–2	2–1	3–0	2–1	1–0	2–1	1–1	1–2	4–0	7–1	2–1	2–1	7–1
Minerul Comănești	3–0	0–0		4–0	3–2	3–0	1–0	2–0	1–0	4–0	6–1	2–0	4–0	3–0	2–1	2–0
Petrolul Moinești	1–0	2–0	1–0		2–0	0–1	1–1	3–1	5–3	3–0	2–1	1–0	1–0	3–1	1–1	2–0
Cimentul Bicaz	1–0	2–1	3–1	2–0		1–1	2–0	2–1	0–0	1–0	3–2	3–1	3–1	3–0	4–0	2–2
Foresta Fălticeni	1–1	2–1	0–0	1–0	2–0		2–1	2–0	2–0	4–1	1–0	1–0	4–0	2–1	4–0	4–0
Minerul Gura Humorului	1–1	1–1	2–0	3–0	3–1	2–0		2–0	0–0	5–1	3–1	5–2	2–0	4–0	2–0	4–1
Rarăul Câmpulung Moldovenesc	1–1	1–0	3–0	2–1	0–0	1–0	2–0		2–0	3–0	0–0	2–1	2–0	4–0	2–1	4–1
Nicolina Iași	2–1	1–0	0–0	2–0	1–2	2–2	1–1	2–1		6–0	0–1	4–0	4–0	3–1	0–0	0–0
ITA Pașcani	0–1	2–1	1–1	1–1	2–3	2–1	3–1	3–2	0–0		2–0	1–0	4–0	4–0	8–0	3–1
Penicilina Iași	0–1	0–3	1–0	1–0	3–2	1–0	1–1	2–0	1–2	2–1		1–1	5–0	0–0	2–1	2–1
Textila Botoșani	2–0	0–0	1–0	2–1	1–0	4–1	0–0	2–0	1–1	0–0	1–0		2–0	3–2	1–0	3–0
Minobrad Vatra Dornei	0–2	1–0	1–1	1–1	2–0	4–0	2–0	5–1	5–0	3–1	1–0	2–0		0–1	2–1	7–3
Letea Bacău	0–0	1–1	2–0	1–2	3–1	4–1	1–0	1–0	4–0	0–1	2–0	4–0	1–3		2–3	7–0
Textila Buhuși	1–0	1–1	2–0	0–2	1–2	3–1	3–1	1–0	0–2	2–1	2–2	3–0	4–1	1–1		8–0
Fulgerul Dorohoi	0–4	2–2	1–2	0–1	4–3	3–0	3–1	1–2	5–0	1–2	3–1	1–0	2–0	2–2	2–0	

Source: LT (in Romanian)
Legend: Blue = home team win; Yellow = draw; Red = away team win.

=== Series II ===
==== League table ====
Pos	Team	Pld	W	D	L	GF	GA	GD	Pts	Promotion or relegation
1	Metalul Plopeni (C)	30	20	5	5	49	19	+30	45	Qualification to promotion play-off
2	Șoimii Buzău	30	15	6	9	47	28	+19	36	
3	Rulmentul Bârlad	30	11	14	5	30	25	+5	36	
4	Olimpia Râmnicu Sărat	30	14	5	11	39	48	−9	33	
5	Metalul Buzău	30	12	7	11	46	36	+10	31	
6	Petrolistul Boldești	30	12	5	13	57	39	+18	29	
7	Unirea Tricolor Brăila	30	10	9	11	31	44	−13	29	
8	Ancora Galați	30	11	6	13	30	38	−8	28	
9	Voința București	30	9	9	12	33	32	+1	27	
10	Dacia Galați	30	9	9	12	35	38	−3	27	
11	Muncitorul Tecuci	30	7	13	10	43	49	−6	27	
12	Trotușul Gheorghe Gheorghiu-Dej	30	11	5	14	39	52	−13	27	
13	Automobilul Focșani	30	12	3	15	30	47	−17	27	
14	SUT Galați	30	9	8	13	32	26	+6	26	
15	Petrolul Berca	30	9	8	13	32	40	−8	26	Spared from relegation
16	Metalurgistul Brăila	30	9	8	13	31	43	−12	26	Spared from relegation

Source: romaniansoccer.ro
(C) Champions

==== Results ====
Home \ Away	PLO	ȘOI	RUL	ORS	MBZ	PBL	UTB	ANC	VOI	DGL	MTE	TRO	AFO	SUT	PBR	MBR
Metalul Plopeni		1–0	3–0	2–0	2–0	3–1	2–0	2–1	2–1	6–0	3–2	3–0	2–0	3–0	2–1	3–0
Șoimii Buzău	1–0		1–1	0–1	1–2	3–1	7–0	3–0	2–1	2–1	5–5	3–0	0–1	1–0	1–0	2–1
Rulmentul Bârlad	0–0	1–0		1–1	1–1	3–0	1–1	1–0	1–0	1–1	1–1	2–1	2–0	1–0	1–0	1–0
Olimpia Râmnicu Sărat	4–1	0–0	1–0		3–2	1–0	2–2	1–0	1–0	2–0	2–0	3–2	4–1	2–1	3–2	1–1
Metalul Buzău	1–1	0–1	1–1	4–1		2–1	2–0	2–1	3–1	0–0	3–1	3–1	2–0	0–1	4–0	3–0
Petrolistul Boldești	0–1	2–1	2–2	3–1	2–0		4–0	1–0	3–0	2–0	5–1	6–2	8–0	2–0	0–0	4–0
Unirea Tricolor Brăila	0–1	0–0	0–0	3–0	1–0	2–1		0–1	0–0	1–0	4–1	3–0	2–0	2–1	2–0	2–2
Ancora Galați	2–0	1–4	3–2	1–2	1–0	3–1	1–0		2–1	1–2	1–2	1–0	2–1	0–0	2–0	2–1
Voința București	1–1	1–0	2–0	2–0	1–1	2–1	4–0	2–0		0–1	2–1	1–0	0–1	0–0	1–1	3–0
Dacia Galați	0–1	2–1	1–3	5–0	2–3	0–0	0–0	0–0	1–1		5–1	2–1	2–1	0–0	2–0	4–3
Muncitorul Tecuci	0–0	0–0	1–1	0–0	3–3	1–1	4–1	0–0	2–0	1–1		3–3	4–0	1–0	3–2	3–1
Trotușul Gheorghe Gheorghiu-Dej	3–2	1–1	0–1	3–0	1–0	3–1	1–1	2–2	3–2	1–0	2–1		1–0	1–0	2–2	2–1
Automobilul Focșani	0–1	2–1	3–0	1–0	2–1	2–1	2–0	1–1	3–2	2–1	1–0	1–2		1–0	1–1	0–0
SUT Galați	0–1	0–1	1–1	6–0	3–1	1–1	6–2	1–1	1–1	1–0	0–0	4–0	2–0		1–0	2–0
Petrolul Berca	0–0	2–3	0–0	3–2	1–0	3–2	1–2	2–0	0–0	2–1	1–1	2–1	3–2	1–0		2–0
Metalurgistul Brăila	1–0	1–2	0–0	2–1	2–2	2–1	0–0	4–0	1–1	1–1	1–0	1–0	2–1	2–0	1–0	

Source: (in Romanian)
Legend: Blue = home team win; Yellow = draw; Red = away team win.

=== Series III ===
==== League table ====
Pos	Team	Pld	W	D	L	GF	GA	GD	Pts	Promotion or relegation
1	Delta Tulcea (C)	30	21	3	6	57	16	+41	45	Qualification to promotion play-off
2	Electronica București	30	18	3	9	46	20	+26	39	
3	Flacăra Roșie București	30	17	4	9	45	31	+14	38	
4	Prahova Ploiești	30	14	8	8	38	24	+14	36	
5	IMU Medgidia	30	13	7	10	44	31	+13	33	
6	Azotul Slobozia	30	13	5	12	35	51	−16	31	
7	Tehnometal București	30	8	13	9	28	31	−3	29	
8	Olimpia Giurgiu	30	11	7	12	30	35	−5	29	
9	Celuloza Călărași	30	11	6	13	37	38	−1	28	
10	Electrica Constanța	30	11	6	13	38	47	−9	28	
11	Cimentul Medgidia	30	10	7	13	35	37	−2	27	
12	Unirea București	30	12	3	15	39	42	−3	27	
13	Victoria Florești	30	7	12	11	30	36	−6	26	
14	Dunărea Tulcea	30	8	9	13	24	45	−21	25	
15	Laromet București	30	8	8	14	25	29	−4	24	Spared from relegation
16	Marina Mangalia	30	5	5	20	19	57	−38	15	Spared from relegation

Source: romaniansoccer.ro
(C) Champions

==== Results ====
Home \ Away	DEL	ELB	FRB	PRA	IMU	AZO	TEH	OLI	CEL	ECT	CIM	UNB	VFL	DTL	LAR	MAR
Delta Tulcea		1–0	4–1	2–0	3–0	7–0	0–0	3–1	2–0	2–0	2–0	4–0	4–1	4–0	2–0	3–1
Electronica București	1–0		2–2	0–1	1–0	2–0	1–0	2–0	6–0	5–1	2–1	3–0	2–1	8–0	1–0	3–0
Flacăra Roșie București	2–0	0–0		3–0	2–0	4–0	2–0	2–1	1–0	3–1	2–1	1–0	2–0	3–1	2–1	2–1
Prahova Ploiești	1–2	1–2	4–0		0–0	1–0	4–0	1–0	2–0	2–0	2–1	3–0	2–0	1–0	2–0	1–0
IMU Medgidia	1–0	4–0	2–0	1–0		7–1	3–1	0–2	1–2	4–3	1–1	3–1	2–0	3–0	2–0	3–1
Azotul Slobozia	0–2	1–0	2–3	1–0	1–1		2–1	1–0	2–0	2–1	3–1	1–0	1–1	1–0	2–1	3–0
Tehnometal București	0–0	0–0	1–2	3–1	1–0	0–1		2–0	1–1	1–1	3–1	0–0	0–0	1–0	0–0	2–0
Olimpia Giurgiu	0–1	0–1	0–0	2–2	2–0	1–1	2–1		1–0	2–1	1–1	1–0	0–1	2–0	2–0	2–0
Celuloza Călărași	0–2	1–0	1–3	1–1	1–0	5–2	0–0	3–2		2–1	1–0	4–2	0–0	5–0	1–1	5–0
Electrica Constanța	1–0	1–0	2–1	1–2	0–0	3–2	2–2	1–1	2–0		2–1	2–2	1–0	0–0	2–1	1–0
Cimentul Medgidia	3–0	2–0	1–0	1–1	1–1	4–0	1–2	1–1	3–2	2–1		1–0	0–0	0–0	1–0	2–0
Unirea București	1–3	1–0	2–1	1–0	3–1	2–0	1–2	7–0	0–2	3–1	2–0		2–1	0–3	2–0	3–1
Victoria Florești	1–0	1–2	2–1	1–1	1–1	2–2	0–0	2–1	1–0	1–2	4–0	1–1		4–4	0–1	2–0
Dunărea Tulcea	0–1	1–0	1–0	0–0	1–1	2–0	1–1	0–1	1–0	0–3	2–1	1–0	1–1		0–0	3–0
Laromet București	1–1	0–1	0–0	1–1	0–1	0–0	1–1	1–2	1–0	4–0	1–0	2–0	3–1	2–0		3–0
Marina Mangalia	0–2	0–1	1–0	1–1	2–1	0–3	4–2	0–0	0–0	2–1	1–3	0–3	0–0	2–2	2–0	

Source: (in Romanian)
Legend: Blue = home team win; Yellow = draw; Red = away team win.

=== Series IV ===
==== League table ====
Pos	Team	Pld	W	D	L	GF	GA	GD	Pts	Promotion or relegation
1	Chimia Râmnicu Vâlcea (C)	30	20	4	6	51	26	+25	44	Qualification to promotion play-off
2	FC Caracal	30	19	4	7	57	27	+30	42	
3	Chimia Turnu Măgurele	30	14	7	9	38	31	+7	35	
4	TMB București	30	12	8	10	41	31	+10	32	
5	IRA Câmpina	30	11	10	9	31	25	+6	32	
6	Comerțul Alexandria	30	13	6	11	37	35	+2	32	
7	Mașini Unelte București	30	15	2	13	51	51	0	32	
8	Petrolul Videle	30	12	6	12	37	33	+4	30	
9	Dacia Pitești	30	11	7	12	36	39	−3	29	
10	Petrolul Târgoviște	30	8	13	9	34	45	−11	29	
11	Gloria Slatina	30	10	7	13	28	30	−2	27	
12	Autobuzul București	30	10	4	16	39	34	+5	24	
13	Sirena București	30	8	8	14	35	49	−14	24	
14	Lotru Brezoi	30	9	6	15	32	48	−16	24	
15	Progresul Corabia	30	7	8	15	31	50	−19	22	Spared from relegation
16	Unirea Drăgășani	30	8	6	16	22	46	−24	22	Spared from relegation

Source: romaniansoccer.ro
(C) Champions

==== Results ====
Home \ Away	CRV	CAR	CTM	TMB	IRA	COM	MUB	PVI	DPI	PTG	GSL	AUT	SIR	LOT	PRC	UDR
Chimia Râmnicu Vâlcea		1–0	2–0	2–1	1–1	1–0	3–1	1–0	2–0	1–0	1–0	3–0	3–0	2–1	4–1	4–1
FC Caracal	1–0		1–0	4–3	3–1	3–0	3–1	4–0	4–1	1–0	1–0	2–1	7–0	4–0	3–1	2–0
Chimia Turnu Măgurele	4–2	4–2		1–0	2–1	1–0	3–1	3–1	2–0	1–0	2–1	2–0	1–1	4–1	1–0	1–1
TMB București	0–0	1–0	2–3		0–0	1–0	3–3	2–1	4–1	4–0	1–0	1–0	0–0	0–0	4–0	2–1
IRA Câmpina	2–1	3–1	2–0	0–2		4–0	2–1	1–0	1–1	0–0	2–1	1–0	4–1	1–1	0–0	2–0
Comerțul Alexandria	1–1	2–1	0–0	1–0	2–0		3–0	1–0	1–0	3–0	2–0	1–1	1–1	3–1	3–0	4–0
Mașini Unelte București	1–2	1–2	4–2	2–1	2–1	3–1		0–1	5–2	4–1	0–1	2–1	3–2	2–1	2–1	3–1
Petrolul Videle	2–1	1–1	1–0	1–0	0–0	2–3	1–2		4–0	2–2	2–0	1–0	4–2	3–0	3–1	1–0
Dacia Pitești	0–1	1–1	0–0	0–1	2–0	2–0	2–1	1–0		2–0	1–1	1–2	3–0	2–1	3–1	4–0
Petrolul Târgoviște	2–4	2–1	0–0	1–1	1–0	4–1	1–1	1–1	1–1		2–0	1–0	1–0	2–1	1–1	2–2
Gloria Slatina	3–1	0–0	0–0	1–2	2–0	0–0	0–1	1–0	1–0	1–1		0–0	0–0	4–0	4–0	1–0
Autobuzul București	1–3	1–2	1–0	1–1	0–0	4–1	5–1	1–0	0–1	6–0	1–2		2–1	1–0	5–1	3–0
Sirena București	2–0	0–1	0–0	1–1	1–0	0–1	2–1	0–1	2–3	2–2	2–3	2–1		2–2	3–1	3–0
Lotru Brezoi	0–2	1–1	3–0	1–0	0–2	1–0	1–2	2–1	2–1	3–3	2–0	2–1	2–1		2–0	0–0
Progresul Corabia	0–0	0–1	2–1	3–1	0–0	2–2	2–0	2–2	0–0	1–1	5–1	1–0	0–1	3–1		2–0
Unirea Drăgășani	1–2	1–0	2–0	3–2	0–0	2–0	0–1	1–1	1–1	0–2	1–0	1–0	1–3	1–0	1–0	

Source: (in Romanian)
Legend: Blue = home team win; Yellow = draw; Red = away team win.

=== Series V ===
==== League table ====
Pos	Team	Pld	W	D	L	GF	GA	GD	Pts	Promotion or relegation
1	Vulturii Textila Lugoj (C)	30	15	7	8	63	23	+40	37	Qualification to promotion play-off
2	Știința Petroșani	30	15	7	8	43	17	+26	37	
3	Minerul Lupeni	30	16	3	11	40	32	+8	35	
4	CFR Caransebeș	30	14	4	12	38	37	+1	32	
5	Dunărea Calafat	30	13	5	12	39	38	+1	31	
6	Electromotor Timișoara	30	12	7	11	35	39	−4	31	
7	Minerul Moldova Nouă	30	14	3	13	30	38	−8	31	
8	Metalul Turnu Severin	30	11	7	12	51	44	+7	29	
9	Pandurii Târgu Jiu	30	10	9	11	31	31	0	29	
10	MEVA Turnu Severin	30	11	6	13	38	53	−15	28	
11	Minerul Motru	30	9	10	11	20	36	−16	28	
12	Metalul Topleț	30	12	3	15	38	46	−8	27	
13	Steagul Roșu Plenița	30	11	5	14	31	39	−8	27	
14	Minerul Bocșa Montană	30	12	3	15	39	51	−12	27	
15	Victoria Caransebeș	30	9	8	13	36	41	−5	26	Spared from relegation
16	Furnirul Deta	30	10	5	15	35	42	−7	25	Spared from relegation

Source: romaniansoccer.ro
(C) Champions

==== Results ====
Home \ Away	VUL	ȘPT	LUP	CFR	DCA	ETM	MMN	MTS	PAN	MEV	MMO	MTO	SRP	MBM	VCA	FUR
Vulturii Textila Lugoj		1–2	2–0	2–0	5–0	9–0	4–0	3–1	3–0	2–2	4–0	2–0	5–0	3–0	1–1	4–0
Știința Petroșani	2–0		0–1	2–1	1–0	2–0	2–0	1–0	0–0	6–0	3–0	4–0	3–0	3–0	2–0	2–0
Minerul Lupeni	2–1	0–0		2–1	1–0	1–0	2–0	1–0	2–0	2–3	3–0	3–0	3–1	3–1	5–0	4–3
CFR Caransebeș	0–0	0–1	1–0		2–1	0–0	1–0	1–0	1–0	4–0	2–0	3–1	1–0	3–0	0–0	2–1
Dunărea Calafat	1–0	1–0	2–0	4–2		0–0	2–1	1–1	3–1	4–0	1–0	2–1	0–0	3–0	3–0	2–1
Electromotor Timișoara	1–0	2–1	0–1	3–1	1–1		2–0	1–0	2–1	4–3	0–1	3–0	3–0	4–1	1–0	2–1
Minerul Moldova Nouă	2–0	1–0	2–0	3–1	2–1	1–0		2–0	2–0	0–0	0–0	2–0	3–0	2–0	2–1	1–0
Metalul Turnu Severin	3–4	2–2	3–0	1–2	4–1	0–0	4–1		0–0	2–1	5–1	3–0	3–1	4–2	3–2	5–2
Pandurii Târgu Jiu	0–0	2–2	0–2	1–0	3–0	0–0	4–1	2–0		1–0	1–0	2–0	3–1	2–0	3–1	0–0
MEVA Turnu Severin	1–1	2–1	2–1	0–1	1–2	5–3	1–0	2–2	1–0		1–1	1–0	1–0	1–1	2–1	2–0
Minerul Motru	2–1	0–0	1–1	0–1	1–0	1–0	1–1	2–1	1–1	1–1		0–0	3–1	2–0	0–0	1–0
Metalul Topleț	1–1	1–0	1–0	4–3	2–1	3–0	4–0	4–0	1–1	2–1	3–0		1–0	2–3	3–0	3–2
Steagul Roșu Plenița	1–0	0–0	0–0	4–0	2–1	1–1	2–0	2–0	2–1	3–0	1–0	3–0		2–0	2–2	2–1
Minerul Bocșa Montană	1–2	1–0	3–0	4–0	1–1	2–0	3–0	1–1	3–1	4–3	2–0	2–1	1–0		1–1	2–0
Victoria Caransebeș	0–3	0–0	2–0	1–4	3–1	1–1	3–0	1–2	2–0	3–0	0–0	3–0	1–0	3–1		4–0
Furnirul Deta	0–0	2–1	3–0	1–1	2–0	2–1	0–1	1–1	1–1	2–0	3–0	1–0	2–0	3–0	1–0	

Source: (in Romanian)
Legend: Blue = home team win; Yellow = draw; Red = away team win.

=== Series VI ===
==== League table ====
Pos	Team	Pld	W	D	L	GF	GA	GD	Pts	Promotion or relegation
1	Independența Sibiu (C)	30	19	3	8	51	31	+20	41	Qualification to promotion play-off
2	Mureșul Deva	30	18	4	8	46	29	+17	40	
3	Chimica Târnăveni	30	17	4	9	59	31	+28	38	
4	Victoria Călan	30	15	3	12	34	31	+3	33	
5	Metalul Aiud	30	13	6	11	58	46	+12	32	
6	Minaur Zlatna	30	15	1	14	43	43	0	31	
7	Aurul Brad	30	14	3	13	36	36	0	31	
8	ASA Sibiu	30	10	9	11	32	29	+3	29	
9	Soda Ocna Mureș	30	11	7	12	39	47	−8	29	
10	IS Câmpia Turzii	30	12	4	14	38	34	+4	28	
11	Minerul Ghelar	30	13	2	15	32	35	−3	28	
12	Minerul Teliuc	30	12	3	15	36	43	−7	27	
13	Unirea Alba Iulia	30	11	5	14	29	44	−15	27	
14	Metalul Copșa Mică	30	10	5	15	33	45	−12	25	
15	CFR Simeria	30	9	5	16	35	40	−5	23	Spared from relegation
16	Arieșul Câmpia Turzii	30	6	6	18	17	54	−37	18	Spared from relegation

Source: romaniansoccer.ro
(C) Champions

==== Results ====
Home \ Away	IND	MUR	CHT	VCĂ	AIU	ZLA	AUR	ASA	SOD	ISC	GHE	TEL	UAI	COP	SIM	ACT
Independența Sibiu		2–0	4–1	2–0	0–0	1–0	5–1	2–1	2–1	3–1	2–0	4–1	1–0	2–0	2–0	5–0
Mureșul Deva	3–1		1–1	2–1	5–1	3–0	1–0	1–0	5–0	1–0	2–0	2–0	1–0	1–0	2–0	4–0
Chimica Târnăveni	1–1	1–1		4–0	6–0	3–0	2–0	2–1	2–0	3–2	2–0	3–2	4–0	6–0	2–0	5–0
Victoria Călan	1–0	2–1	2–0		3–0	6–1	1–0	1–0	0–0	3–2	1–0	2–1	2–1	1–0	1–0	3–1
Metalul Aiud	6–1	7–2	4–0	3–0		4–0	1–0	2–1	1–1	3–1	2–0	3–0	5–2	4–1	3–2	1–2
Minaur Zlatna	1–2	1–0	1–0	1–0	1–0		5–0	1–1	3–1	4–1	2–1	2–1	3–0	6–1	1–0	2–0
Aurul Brad	0–1	1–0	0–0	2–0	1–0	1–0		0–0	6–2	2–1	2–0	1–0	5–0	1–1	3–2	5–0
ASA Sibiu	0–1	0–0	4–1	1–1	2–2	0–1	1–0		2–0	2–0	2–0	3–1	1–1	2–0	1–0	0–0
Soda Ocna Mureș	2–1	3–0	0–3	1–0	1–1	1–0	3–0	1–1		3–1	4–2	3–0	1–0	0–0	3–0	2–1
IS Câmpia Turzii	0–1	2–1	1–2	1–0	1–1	2–0	2–1	3–0	3–0		0–0	2–0	3–0	2–0	3–0	3–0
Minerul Ghelar	2–0	0–1	2–1	0–1	3–2	3–5	3–0	1–0	2–0	1–0		1–0	3–0	1–0	0–0	3–0
Minerul Teliuc	3–1	3–0	1–0	2–1	2–1	1–0	2–0	3–1	2–1	0–0	0–1		3–1	1–0	2–1	0–0
Unirea Alba Iulia	1–2	0–0	1–0	2–0	1–0	3–1	2–0	0–0	2–2	2–0	2–0	1–0		2–0	3–1	1–1
Metalul Copșa Mică	1–1	1–2	1–0	2–1	1–1	1–0	1–2	1–2	2–2	1–0	2–0	5–2	4–0		2–0	1–0
CFR Simeria	3–1	2–3	1–2	0–0	5–0	4–0	0–1	3–2	2–0	0–0	2–0	2–1	1–0	3–1		0–0
Arieșul Câmpia Turzii	1–0	0–1	1–2	1–0	1–0	2–1	0–1	0–2	3–1	0–1	0–3	2–2	0–1	0–3	1–1	

Source: (in Romanian)
Legend: Blue = home team win; Yellow = draw; Red = away team win.

=== Series VII ===
==== League table ====
Pos	Team	Pld	W	D	L	GF	GA	GD	Pts	Promotion or relegation
1	Arieșul Turda (C)	30	17	7	6	69	31	+38	41	Qualification to promotion play-off
2	Unirea Dej	30	18	5	7	66	29	+37	41	
3	Victoria Carei	30	17	4	9	41	26	+15	38	
4	CIL Gherla	30	17	3	10	53	27	+26	37	
5	CIL Sighetu Marmației	30	14	6	10	39	34	+5	34	
6	Gloria Baia Mare	30	14	5	11	44	40	+4	33	
7	Unirea Zalău	30	12	8	10	41	31	+10	32	
8	Dermata Cluj	30	13	6	11	39	35	+4	32	
9	Recolta Salonta	30	12	8	10	37	43	−6	32	
10	Minerul Baia Sprie	30	14	3	13	42	41	+1	31	
11	Bradul Vișeu	30	10	6	14	36	41	−5	26	
12	Someșul Satu Mare	30	10	4	16	31	47	−16	24	
13	Progresul Năsăud	30	9	6	15	31	56	−25	24	
14	Constructorul Baia Mare	30	8	6	16	31	46	−15	22	
15	Chimistul Baia Mare	30	7	7	16	31	36	−5	21	Spared from relegation
16	Someșul Beclean	30	3	6	21	29	97	−68	12	Spared from relegation

Source: romaniansoccer.ro
(C) Champions

==== Results ====
Home \ Away	ARI	DEJ	VCA	GHE	CIL	GBM	ZAL	DER	SAL	MBS	BVI	SSM	PRN	CBM	CHB	SBE
Arieșul Turda		2–0	5–0	4–0	2–0	5–0	1–1	1–0	6–0	3–0	1–0	2–1	4–0	2–1	2–1	5–0
Unirea Dej	2–2		5–2	3–2	4–0	4–1	2–2	4–1	2–0	3–0	2–1	4–1	1–0	5–0	3–2	8–0
Victoria Carei	1–0	1–0		1–0	1–0	2–0	3–0	3–1	2–0	2–0	2–0	3–1	5–0	2–0	0–0	1–0
CIL Gherla	2–0	0–0	1–0		1–0	2–0	0–0	1–0	2–0	3–0	3–0	2–0	4–0	3–0	3–1	9–1
CIL Sighetu Marmației	2–1	1–0	1–3	2–0		2–0	3–0	3–0	3–0	3–2	1–1	2–0	4–0	1–0	3–0	0–0
Gloria Baia Mare	3–3	2–2	2–0	1–0	4–0		0–0	0–0	2–0	5–1	2–0	1–1	3–0	1–0	2–1	3–0
Unirea Zalău	1–1	1–3	3–0	1–2	3–0	2–0		0–0	2–1	1–0	4–0	3–0	6–1	3–1	0–1	3–0
Dermata Cluj	0–5	1–0	1–0	3–0	0–1	1–0	2–0		3–0	2–2	2–1	1–0	2–0	2–1	1–0	8–0
Recolta Salonta	1–1	2–1	1–1	2–2	0–0	2–0	3–0	2–0		3–2	2–1	3–0	1–0	1–1	1–0	3–0
Minerul Baia Sprie	3–1	1–0	0–0	2–0	4–2	1–2	2–0	2–1	0–0		1–0	2–0	4–0	3–1	2–1	3–0
Bradul Vișeu	2–2	2–0	1–0	1–3	1–1	2–0	0–2	1–1	1–2	3–0		3–0	4–1	1–0	1–0	4–1
Someșul Satu Mare	1–0	0–3	2–0	1–0	1–2	3–1	0–0	0–1	4–2	2–0	1–1		1–0	4–0	2–0	2–0
Progresul Năsăud	4–1	0–1	1–1	1–3	3–0	3–1	1–0	2–1	1–1	2–1	1–0	1–1		1–1	1–0	5–0
Constructorul Baia Mare	0–0	0–1	1–0	1–0	1–0	2–3	2–2	2–0	3–0	1–0	0–1	4–1	1–1		0–0	5–2
Chimistul Baia Mare	2–3	0–1	0–2	2–1	1–1	0–1	2–0	2–2	1–1	0–1	1–1	3–0	3–0	2–0		5–1
Someșul Beclean	3–4	2–2	0–3	0–4	1–1	1–4	0–1	2–2	2–3	0–3	5–2	3–1	1–1	4–2	0–0	

Source: (in Romanian)
Legend: Blue = home team win; Yellow = draw; Red = away team win.

=== Series VIII ===
==== League table ====
Pos	Team	Pld	W	D	L	GF	GA	GD	Pts	Promotion or relegation
1	Chimia Făgăraș (C)	30	22	4	4	69	19	+50	48	Qualification to promotion play-off
2	Oltul Sfântu Gheorghe	30	19	5	6	51	29	+22	43	
3	Tractorul Brașov	30	14	6	10	56	31	+25	34	
4	Lemnarul Odorheiu Secuiesc	30	14	6	10	58	43	+15	34	
5	Carpați Sinaia	30	13	6	11	55	37	+18	32	
6	Caraimanul Bușteni	30	13	5	12	45	44	+1	31	
7	Viitorul Gheorgheni	30	13	5	12	30	35	−5	31	
8	CFR Sighișoara	30	11	7	12	43	43	0	29	
9	Forestierul Târgu Secuiesc	30	13	3	14	43	49	−6	29	
10	Minerul Bălan	30	12	3	15	38	58	−20	27	
11	Torpedo Zărnești	30	11	3	16	28	57	−29	25	
12	Vitrometan Mediaș	30	11	2	17	43	52	−9	24	
13	Chimia Orașul Victoria	30	9	6	15	44	53	−9	24	
14	Unirea Cristuru Secuiesc	30	9	6	15	42	68	−26	24	
15	Carpați Brașov	30	10	3	17	48	47	+1	23	Spared from relegation
16	Colorom Codlea	30	9	4	17	32	60	−28	22	Spared from relegation

Source: romaniansoccer.ro
(C) Champions

==== Results ====
Home \ Away	CHF	OSG	TRA	LEM	CSI	CBU	VGH	SIG	FTS	BĂL	TOR	VIT	CHV	UCS	CBV	COL
Chimia Făgăraș		3–1	1–0	4–0	1–0	3–0	6–0	5–1	4–3	5–0	4–0	4–0	3–0	4–1	3–2	3–1
Oltul Sfântu Gheorghe	3–1		3–0	2–1	2–1	3–2	3–0	2–0	2–3	2–1	1–0	2–1	3–0	2–2	2–0	2–0
Tractorul Brașov	0–1	0–2		2–2	3–0	3–0	0–0	2–0	1–0	8–1	2–0	1–3	3–0	8–2	3–1	7–0
Lemnarul Odorheiu Secuiesc	0–0	4–0	1–2		4–1	4–2	2–1	0–0	2–0	4–0	1–0	3–1	5–1	7–1	2–0	1–0
Carpați Sinaia	0–2	3–2	2–1	2–0		1–1	1–2	4–1	6–1	4–1	6–0	2–2	2–0	4–0	2–0	3–1
Caraimanul Bușteni	1–0	0–0	0–1	6–3	0–0		1–0	2–1	5–1	2–0	3–1	2–3	2–1	3–0	1–0	4–2
Viitorul Gheorgheni	1–0	1–1	0–0	0–0	0–0	1–0		3–1	3–2	1–0	4–0	1–0	2–1	1–0	1–0	3–0
CFR Sighișoara	1–1	1–1	1–1	4–0	2–1	6–1	2–0		1–0	0–0	0–2	3–1	2–0	3–1	4–1	4–1
Forestierul Târgu Secuiesc	0–0	0–1	1–0	1–0	2–1	2–0	1–2	3–1		3–2	3–0	1–0	4–0	1–0	2–1	1–1
Minerul Bălan	0–1	0–2	0–3	2–0	1–1	1–0	2–1	1–0	2–1		4–1	2–0	2–0	2–2	3–2	2–1
Torpedo Zărnești	1–2	3–1	1–2	1–1	1–0	2–1	2–1	0–0	0–1	1–0		1–0	1–0	3–1	1–1	3–0
Vitrometan Mediaș	0–3	0–1	1–0	3–1	1–3	0–1	1–0	4–0	1–1	4–0	1–2		2–1	3–2	3–1	4–0
Chimia Orașul Victoria	0–2	0–0	4–1	3–3	0–0	1–1	3–0	4–2	5–1	3–1	3–0	5–1		2–1	2–1	1–1
Unirea Cristuru Secuiesc	1–0	0–3	1–1	1–3	2–1	2–1	2–1	1–1	2–1	2–3	4–1	4–1	2–2		1–0	3–2
Carpați Brașov	1–2	1–2	1–1	2–1	3–2	1–1	2–0	0–1	3–1	3–2	9–0	4–2	2–0	3–0		3–0
Colorom Codlea	1–1	1–0	2–0	1–3	1–2	1–2	2–0	1–0	3–2	1–3	1–0	1–0	3–2	1–1	2–0	

Source: (in Romanian)
Legend: Blue = home team win; Yellow = draw; Red = away team win.

== Promotion play-off ==
The winners of each series competed in a promotion play-off held in Bucharest and Oradea, with the eight teams divided into two groups of four. The top two teams from each group earned promotion to Divizia B.

=== Group I (București) ===
Pos	Team	Pld	W	D	L	GF	GA	GD	Pts	Promotion or relegation
1	Chimia Râmnicu Vâlcea (P)	3	1	2	0	4	3	+1	4	Promotion to Divizia B
2	Metalul Plopeni (P)	3	1	1	1	5	4	+1	3	Promotion to Divizia B
3	Chimia Suceava	3	1	1	1	2	2	0	3	
4	Delta Tulcea	3	1	0	2	2	4	−2	2	

Source: romaniansoccer.ro
(P) Promoted

20 June 1971	Delta Tulcea	1–0	Chimia Suceava	București
	Mahera 6'	Report		Stadium: Giulești; Referee: C. Ghemigean (București)

20 June 1971	Metalul Plopeni	2–2	Chimia Râmnicu Vâlcea	București
	P. Gheorghe 48'; Bogaciu 65'	Report	Decu 33'; H. Popescu 90'	Stadium: Politehnica; Referee: C. Bărbulescu (București)

24 June 1971	Chimia Râmnicu Vâlcea	2–1	Delta Tulcea	București
	H. Popescu 43'; Țurcan 47'	Report	Zaiț 66'	Stadium: Politehnica; Referee: C. Niculescu (București)

24 June 1971	Chimia Suceava	2–1	Metalul Plopeni	București
	Teodosiu 14'; Selymeși	Report	Bogaciu 18'	Stadium: Giulești; Referee: Aurel Bentu (București)

27 June 1971	Metalul Plopeni	2–0	Delta Tulcea	București
	Alexiu 68' (pen.); Bogaciu 78'	Report		Stadium: Politehnica; Referee: N. Pădureanu

27 June 1971	Chimia Râmnicu Vâlcea	0–0	Chimia Suceava	București
		Report		Stadium: Giulești; Referee: N. Petriceanu

=== Group II (Oradea) ===
Pos	Team	Pld	W	D	L	GF	GA	GD	Pts	Promotion or relegation
1	Vulturii Textila Lugoj (P)	3	1	2	0	5	2	+3	4	Promotion to Divizia B
2	Arieșul Turda (P)	3	2	0	1	3	4	−1	4	Promotion to Divizia B
3	Chimia Făgăraș	3	1	1	1	3	3	0	3	
4	Independența Sibiu	3	0	1	2	3	5	−2	1	

Source: romaniansoccer.ro
(P) Promoted

20 June 1971	Vulturii Textila Lugoj	1–1	Independența Sibiu	Oradea
	Ghișe 63'	Report	Mihai 31' (o.g.)	Stadium: Crișul; Referee: C. Pop (Hunedoara)

20 June 1971	Arieșul Turda	1–0	Chimia Făgăraș	Oradea
	Moceanu 63'	Report		Stadium: Tineretului; Referee: Traian Cruceanu (Arad)

23 June 1971	Chimia Făgăraș	2–1	Independența Sibiu	Oradea
	Ioniță 62'; Feher 86'	Report	Chercioiu 10'	Referee: M. Bădulescu (Oradea)

23 June 1972	Vulturii Textila Lugoj	3–0	Arieșul Turda	Oradea
	Mihai 46'; Luchescu 73'; Becheru 82'	Report		Referee: I. Barbu (Aiud)

27 June 1971	Vulturii Textila Lugoj	1–1	Chimia Făgăraș	Oradea
	Becheru 21'	Report	Boantă 88' (pen.)	Stadium: Tineretului; Referee: I. Rus (Târgu Mureș)

27 June 1971	Arieșul Turda	2–1	Independența Sibiu	Oradea
	Moceanu 10'; Moceanu 90+3'	Report	Recer 23'	Referee: Otto Anderco (Satu Mare)

== See also ==
- 1970–71 Divizia A
- 1970–71 Divizia B
- 1970–71 County Championship
- 1970–71 Cupa României
