= Victor Roșca =

Romanian footballer and manager

Personal information
- Full name: Victor Dorin Roșca
- Date of birth: 24 August 1954 (age 72)
- Place of birth: Podgoria, Romania
- Position: Goalkeeper

Senior career*
Years	Team	Apps	(Gls)
1974–1977	Rapid București		
1977–1985	Chimia Râmnicu Vâlcea	126	(1)
1985–1988	Gloria Reșița		
1988–1990	Metalul Bocșa		
Total		126+	(1)

Managerial career
- 1990–1992: Metalul Bocșa
- 1992–1996: Gloria Reșița
- 1997: CSM Reșița
- 1997: Politehnica Timișoara
- 1998: Minerul Motru
- 1999: CSM Reșița
- 1999–2000: Corvinul Hunedoara
- 2000–2001: Petrolul Ploiești
- 2002: Oțelul Galați
- 2002–2004: Inter Gaz București
- 2005–2006: UTA Arad
- 2006–2007: FCM Reșița
- 2007: Arieșul Turda
- 2007: CFR Simeria
- 2008: Arieșul Turda
- 2010–2011: Filipeștii de Pădure
- 2011: ABC Stoicescu
- 2011–2012: Blejoi
- 2012: CSM Câmpina
- 2015: Hunedoara
- * Club domestic league appearances and goals as of 20 April 2020

Victor Dorin Roșca (born 24 August 1954) is a Romanian former professional footballer and manager.

== Playing career ==
As a footballer, Roșca was the goalkeeper of Divizia A teams Rapid București and Chimia Râmnicu Vâlcea. Roșca promoted with Chimia in the top-flight in 1978 and is considered one of the best goalkeepers in the history of the club. "Vicky" Roșca played in 126 matches for Chimia and scored a goal, one of the few goalkeepers that scored in the Liga I.

== Manager career ==
Roșca retired in the late 1980s and started his manager career at Metalul Bocșa, subsequently managing second tier side Gloria Reșița. Roșca built at Gloria one of the best squads in the history of this club. As a reward for his work, Roșca was promoted in 1996 as the manager of CSM Reșița and at the end of the season he promoted "the Milan from Banat" in the Divizia A. After this performance, Roșca moved in the next years to Politehnica Timișoara, Minerul Motru and Corvinul Hunedoara, all second tier teams.

In 2000 he was signed as the new manager of Divizia A club Petrolul Ploiești, then in 2002 moved to Oțelul Galați. After 2002, Roșca never managed again in the top-flight, but was an active manager in the lower divisions and led from the bench, teams such as Inter Gaz București, UTA Arad, FCM Reșița, Arieșul Turda (second tier); AFC Filipeștii de Pădure, CS Blejoi or CS Hunedoara, among others (third and fourth tier).

In recent years, Victor Roșca was a match observer for the Romanian Football Federation.

=== Famous quote ===
In 2000, when Roșca was coach at Petrolul, at the press conference that was held before a game with Rapid București, a journalist kept insisting to ask him to reveal his tactic for the game, so Roșca said to him, ironically:"Short passes and up, you have, you don't have the ball, you shoot at the goal!".

== Honours ==
=== Player ===
Chimia Râmnicu Vâlcea

- Divizia B: Winner (1) 1977–78

=== Manager ===
CSM Reșița

- Divizia B: Winner (1) 1996–97

Blejoi

- Cupa României – Prahova County: Winner (1) 2011–12
