= 1960–61 Cupa României =

Tournament details
- Country: Romania

Final positions
- Champions: Arieșul Turda
- Runners-up: Rapid București

The 1960–61 Cupa României was the 23rd edition of Romania's most prestigious football cup competition.

The title was won by Arieșul Turda against Rapid București.

== Format ==
The competition is an annual knockout tournament.

In the first round proper, two pots were made, first pot with Divizia A teams and other teams till 16 and the second pot with the rest of teams qualified in this phase. Each tie is played as a single leg.

It is the fourth season in the history of Cupa României when all the games are played on a neutral location.

If a match is drawn after 90 minutes, the game goes in extra time, and if the scored is still tight after 120 minutes, then a replay will be played. In case the game is still tight after the replay, then the team from lower division will qualify for the next round.

From the first edition, the teams from Divizia A entered in competition in sixteen finals, rule which remained till today.

== First round proper ==
Team 1	Score	Team 2
18 April 1961
CSMS Iaşi (Div. A)	8–2	(Div. B) Rulmentul Bârlad
UTA Arad (Div. A)	4–1	(Div. B) CS Oradea
19 April 1961
CSM Reșița (Div. B)	2–1	(Div. A) Minerul Lupeni
ȘNM Constanța (Div. B)	2–1	(Div. A) Farul Constanța
Penicilina Iaşi (Div. C)	1–1 (a.e.t.)	(Div. C) Laminorul Roman
CCA București (Div. A)	4–2	(Div. B) Electroputere Craiova
Petrolul Ploiești (Div. A)	3–1	(Div. B) Prahova Ploiești
Voinţa București (Div. C)	3–1	(Div. C) Rapid Mizil
Progresul București (Div. A)	4–0	(Div. C) Dunărea Giurgiu
CFR Timișoara (Div. B)	0–3	(Div. A) Ştiinţa Timişoara
IS Câmpia Turzii (Div. B)	3–1	(Div. A) Ştiinţa Cluj
20 April 1961
Rapid București (Div. A)	3–1	(Div. B) Metalul București
24 May 1961
Steagul Roşu Braşov (Div. A)	6–1	(Div. B) Mureşul Târgu Mureş
Corvinul Hunedoara (Div. A)	1–1 (a.e.t.)	(Div. B) Arieșul Turda
25 June 1961
CSM Sibiu (Div. B)	1–0	(Div. A) Dinamo București
Dinamo Bacău (Div. A)	3–0 (forfait)	(Div. C) Unio Satu Mare
24 May 1961 — Replay
Penicilina Iaşi (Div. C)	1–0 (a.e.t.)	(Div. C) Laminorul Roman
31 May 1961 — Replay
Arieșul Turda (Div. B)	2–0	(Div. A) Corvinul Hunedoara

== Second round proper ==
Team 1	Score	Team 2
21 June 1961
CCA București	5–2	CSM Reșița
25 June 1961
UTA Arad	3–1	CSMS Iaşi
28 June 1961
Voinţa București	1–0	ŞNM Constanţa
Steagul Roşu Braşov	3–2	IS Câmpia Turzii
Arieșul Turda	7–1	Penicilina Iaşi
13 August 1961
Ştiinţa Timişoara	5–2	CSM Sibiu
Progresul București	5–1	Dinamo Bacău
30 August 1961
Rapid București	3–1	Petrolul Ploiești

== Quarter-finals ==
Team 1	Score	Team 2
12 October 1961
UTA Arad	3–2	Voinţa București
Arieșul Turda	2–1 (a.e.t.)	Ştiinţa Timişoara
18 October 1961
CCA București	3–0	Progresul București
Rapid București	5–1	Steagul Roşu Braşov

== Semi-finals ==
Team 1	Score	Team 2
22 October 1961
Rapid București	2–0	CCA București
Arieșul Turda	3–0	UTA Arad

== Final ==
12 November 1961
14:30 EET

Arieșul Turda	2–1	Rapid București
Băluţiu 50' (pen.), 51'	Report	Georgescu 24'

Republicii, Bucharest
Attendance: 25,000
Referee: Nicolae Mihăilescu (Bucharest)

Cupa României 1960–61 winners

1st title
