= Blejoi =

- Commune
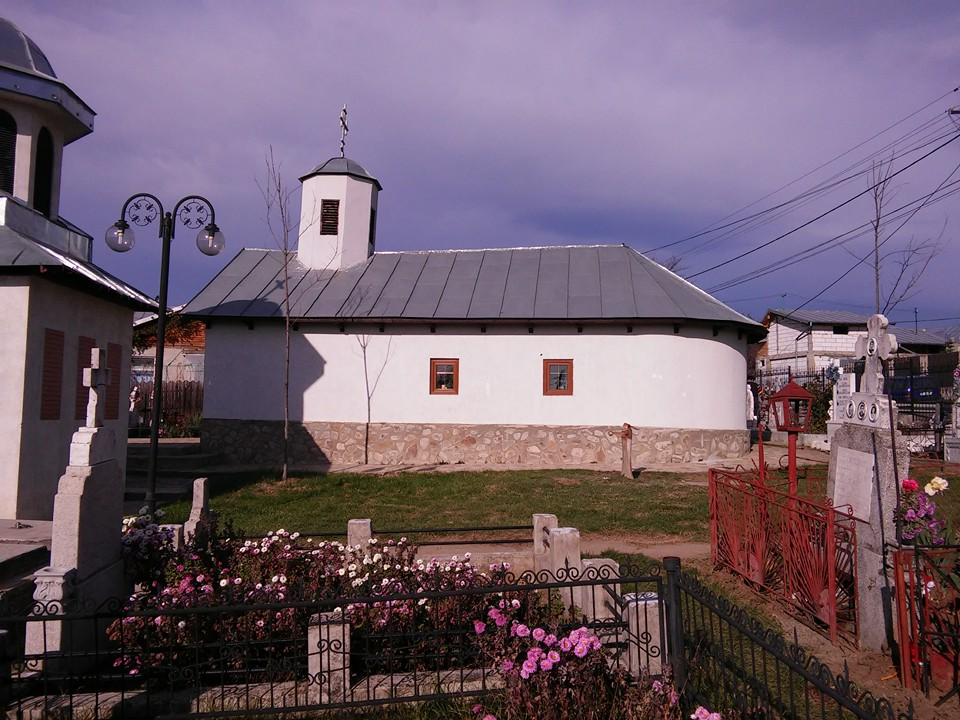
- St. Nicholas Church

- Coat of arms

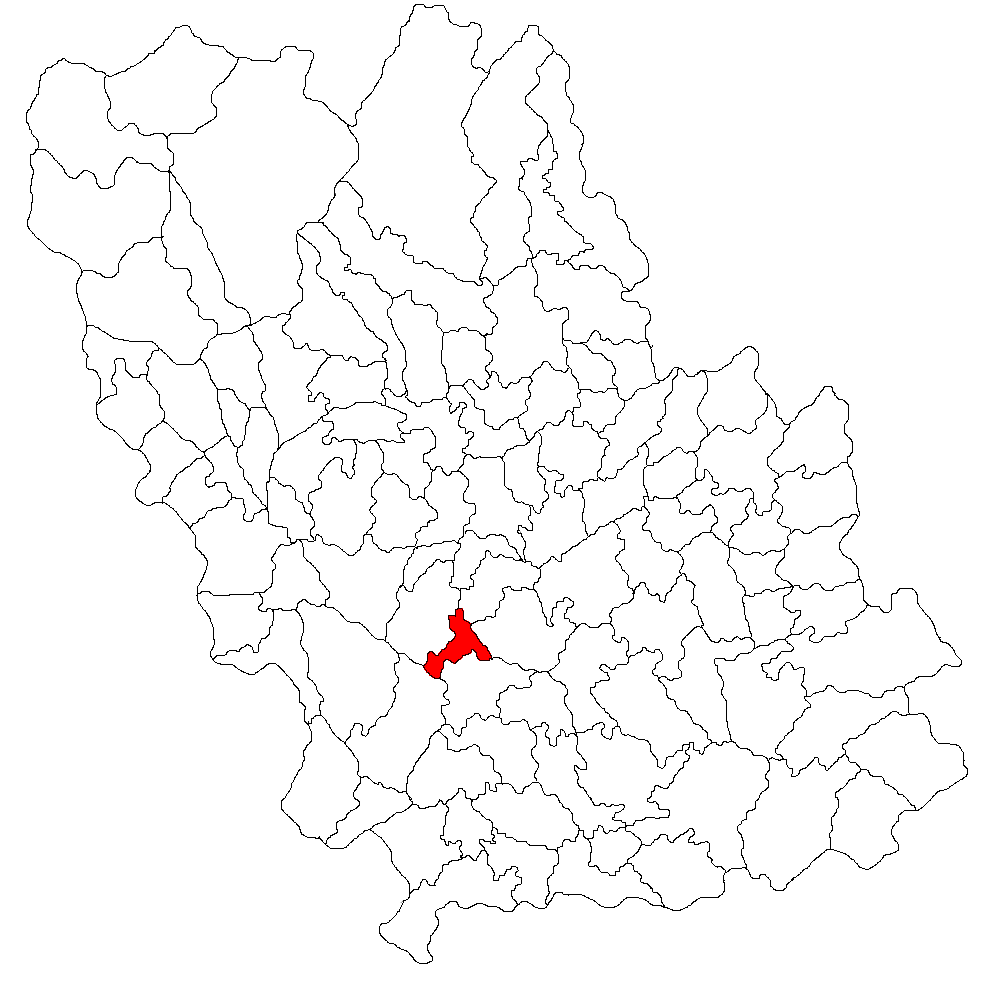
- Location in Prahova County

- Location in Romania
- Coordinates: 45°00′N 26°01′E
- Country: Romania
- County: Prahova

Government
  - Mayor (2020–2024): Adrian Dumitru (PSD)
- Area: 20.24 km^{2} (7.81 sq mi)
- Elevation: 182 m (597 ft)
- Population (2021-12-01): 9,254
  - Density: 457.2/km^{2} (1,184/sq mi)
- Time zone: UTC+02:00 (EET)
  - Summer (DST): UTC+03:00 (EEST)
- Postal code: 107070
- Area code: +(40) x44
- Vehicle reg.: PH
- Website: primariablejoi.ro

Blejoi is a commune in Prahova County, Muntenia, Romania. It is composed of three villages: Blejoi, Ploieștiori, and Țânțăreni.

Historical population
Year	Pop.	±%
1992	7,634	—
2002	7,922	+3.8%
2011	8,575	+8.2%
2021	9,254	+7.9%
Source: Census data

== Natives ==
- Geo Bogza (1908–1993), avant-garde theorist, poet, and journalist
- Constantin Dimitrescu (1847–1928), classic composer and music teacher
- Alec Sehon (1924–2018), immunologist
- Radu Tudoran (1910–1992), born Nicolae Bogza (brother of Geo), novelist
