= 1982–83 County Championship =

41st season of the Liga IV, the fourth tier of the Romanian football league

Liga IV
- Season: 1982–83

The 1982–83 County Championship was the 41st season of the Liga IV, the fourth tier of the Romanian football league system. The champions of each county association play against one from a neighboring county in a play-off to gain promotion to Divizia C.

== County championships ==
- Alba (AB)
- Arad (AR)
- Argeș (AG)
- Bacău (BC)
- Bihor (BH)
- Bistrița-Năsăud (BN)
- Botoșani (BT)
- Brașov (BV)
- Brăila (BR)
- Bucharest (B)
- Buzău (BZ)
- Caraș-Severin (CS)
- Călărași (CL)
- Cluj (CJ)
- Constanța (CT)
- Covasna (CV)
- Dâmbovița (DB)
- Dolj (DJ)
- Galați (GL)
- Giurgiu (GR)
- Gorj (GJ)
- Harghita (HR)
- Hunedoara (HD)
- Ialomița (IL)
- Iași (IS)
- Ilfov (IF)
- Maramureș (MM)
- Mehedinți (MH)
- Mureș (MS)
- Neamț (NT)
- Olt (OT)
- Prahova (PH)
- Satu Mare (SM)
- Sălaj (SJ)
- Sibiu (SB)
- Suceava (SV)
- Teleorman (TR)
- Timiș (TM)
- Tulcea (TL)
- Vaslui (VS)
- Vâlcea (VL)
- Vrancea (VN)

== Promotion play-off ==
Teams promoted to Divizia C without a play-off matches as teams from less represented counties in the third division.

- (SB) Unirea Ocna Sibiului
- (SJ) Chimia Zalău
- (VL) Recolta Mihăești
- (VS) Inter Vaslui
- (BT) Unirea Săveni
- (GR) Argeșul 30 Decembrie
- (CV) Metalul Târgu Secuiesc

Preliminary round

Team 1	Agg.	Team 2	1st leg	2nd leg
IUPS Chitila (IF)	–	(B) URBIS București	–	–

The matches was played on 10 and 17 July 1983.

Team 1	Agg.	Team 2	1st leg	2nd leg
Cimentul Bicaz (NT)	2–3	(BC) Proletarul Bacău	2–0	0–3
Simared Baia Mare (MM)	0–2	(SM) Unio Satu Mare	0–1	0–1
Constructorul Târgu Jiu (GJ)	2–6	(OT) Știința Drăgănești-Olt	1–3	1–3
Avântul ICRA Pitești (AG)	1–2	(TR) Textila Roșiori	0–0	1–2
Auto Timișoara (TM)	4–4 (Note: Metalul Oțelu Roșu won on the away goals rule.)	(CS) Metalul Oțelu Roșu	4–1	0–3
Petrolul Berca (BZ)	3–2	(PH) Avântul Măneciu	3–0	0–2
Azbestul Dubova (MH)	2–3	(DJ) Progresul Băilești	2–1	0–2
IUPS Chitila (IF)	7–2	(IL) Agronomia Slobozia	4–0	3–2
Electromureș Târgu Mureș (MS)	10–1	(HR) Metalul Vlăhița	6–0	4–1
CIL Blaj (AB)	2–3	(BH) Minerul Șuncuiuș	2–1	0–2
Unirea Dej (CJ)	5–1	(BN) Heniu Prundu Bârgăului	5–0	0–1
Chimia Arad (AR)	1–3	(HD) Mecanica Orăștie	1–1	0–2
Victoria Lehliu (CL)	2–2 (4–2 p)	(CT) Electrica Constanța	2–0	0–2
Progresul Pucioasa (DB)	4–5	(BV) Celuloza Zărnești	3–1	1–4
Avântul Gălănești (SV)	5–2	(IS) Voința Lețcani	4–0	1–2
Victoria TC Galați (GL)	3–2	(VN) Siretul Suraia	3–1	0–1
Tractorul Viziru (BR)	4–0	(TL) Șoimii Topolog	2–0	2–0

== Championships standings ==
=== Arad County ===
Series A

Pos	Team	Pld	W	D	L	GF	GA	GD	Pts	Qualification or relegation
1	Progresul Pecica (Q)	29	22	5	2	87	22	+65	49	Qualification to championship final
2	Gloria Arad	28	22	3	3	78	22	+56	47	
3	Motorul Arad	30	16	8	6	50	21	+29	40	
4	Fulgerul Arad	30	15	7	8	50	29	+21	37	
5	Semlecana Semlac	30	12	8	10	44	37	+7	32	
6	CPL Arad	30	13	6	11	45	47	−2	32	
7	Victoria Nădlac	30	13	4	13	54	44	+10	30	
8	Unirea Șeitin	29	11	6	12	48	39	+9	28	
9	Victoria Zăbrani	30	10	7	13	41	48	−7	27	
10	Mureșul Zădăreni	30	11	4	15	54	52	+2	26	
11	Victoria Ceasuri Arad	30	9	7	14	43	38	+5	25	
12	Înfrățirea Iratoșu	30	10	4	16	52	73	−21	24	
13	Viitorul Turnu	29	10	3	16	43	71	−28	22 (Note: Viitorul Turnu deducted 1 point.)	
14	Libertatea Arad	29	8	4	17	41	72	−31	20	
15	Victoria Felnac (R)	30	7	6	17	25	79	−54	20	Relegation to Arad County Championship II
16	Foraj Zădăreni (R)	30	4	6	20	19	80	−61	14	Relegation to Arad County Championship II

Rules for classification: 1) Points; 2) Goal difference; 3) Number of goals scored.
(Q) Qualified for the phase indicated; (R) Relegated
Notes:

Series B

Pos	Team	Pld	W	D	L	GF	GA	GD	Pts	Qualification or relegation
1	Chimia Arad (Q)	30	23	3	4	91	19	+72	48 (Note: Chimia Arad deducted 1 point.)	Qualification to championship final
2	Strungul Chișineu-Criș	30	16	9	5	71	27	+44	41	
3	Voința Macea	30	18	5	7	66	33	+33	41	
4	Șiriana Șiria	30	15	8	7	50	32	+18	38	
5	Unirea Ineu	30	14	7	9	56	45	+11	35	
6	Gloria Ineu	30	13	8	9	43	31	+12	34	
7	Crișana Sebiș	30	12	9	9	57	39	+18	33	
8	Înainte Sânmartin	29	10	8	11	40	39	+1	28	
9	Crișul Buteni	30	11	6	13	43	65	−22	28	
10	Șoimii Pâncota	29	9	8	12	34	53	−19	26	
11	Unirea Sântana	30	11	3	16	47	69	−22	25	
12	Confecția Hălmagiu	30	9	5	16	43	75	−32	23	
13	Dacia Beliu	30	9	5	16	40	74	−34	23	
14	Unirea Șofronea	30	9	3	18	50	64	−14	21	
15	Stăruința Dorobanți (R)	30	6	6	18	33	55	−22	18	Relegation to Arad County Championship II
16	Olimpia Bocsig (R)	30	4	7	19	29	73	−44	15	Relegation to Arad County Championship II

Rules for classification: 1) Points; 2) Goal difference; 3) Number of goals scored.
(Q) Qualified for the phase indicated; (R) Relegated
Notes:

Championship final

The matches was played on 4 and 8 June 1980.

Team 1	Agg.	Team 2	1st leg	2nd leg
Progresul Pecica	2–5	Chimia Arad	1–2	1–3

Chimia Arad won the Arad County Championship and qualify for promotion play-off in Divizia C.

=== Botoșani County ===
Pos	Team	Pld	W	D	L	GF	GA	GD	Pts	Qualification or relegation
1	Unirea Săveni (C, Q)	26	21	3	2	88	25	+63	44 (Note: Unirea Săveni, Electro-Avântul Botoșani, Sănătatea Darabani, Sportivul Trușești, Ceramica Mașini Unelte Dorohoi, Avântul Abator Răchiți, Rapid Ungureni, Spicul Avrămeni and Voința Șendriceni were deducted all with 1 point.)	Qualification to promotion play-off
2	Avântul Albești	26	19	2	5	81	35	+46	40	
3	Luceafărul Botoșani	26	16	3	7	60	28	+32	35	
4	Electro-Avântul Botoșani	26	14	3	9	68	44	+24	30	
5	Sănătatea Darabani	26	13	4	9	54	47	+7	29	
6	Sportivul Trușești	26	12	4	10	55	53	+2	27	
7	Flacăra Flămânzi	26	12	1	13	55	52	+3	25	
8	Ceramica Mașini Unelte Dorohoi	26	11	4	11	39	44	−5	25	
9	Avântul Abator Răchiți	26	11	3	12	51	40	+11	24	
10	Confecția Săveni	26	11	1	14	51	80	−29	23	
11	Rapid Ungureni	26	8	1	17	30	49	−19	16	
12	Spicul Avrămeni	26	7	2	17	31	77	−46	15	
13	Voința Șendriceni	26	6	3	17	40	73	−33	14	
14	Înainte Copălău	26	4	2	20	20	70	−50	10	

Rules for classification: 1) Points; 2) Goal difference; 3) Number of goals scored.
(C) Champions; (Q) Qualified for the phase indicated

=== Harghita County ===
Pos	Team	Pld	W	D	L	GF	GA	GD	Pts	Qualification or relegation
1	Metalul Vlăhița (C, Q)	22	19	1	2	71	17	+54	39	Qualification to promotion play-off
2	Unirea Hodoșa	22	15	2	5	60	32	+28	32	
3	Flamura Roșie Sânsimion	22	15	1	6	44	26	+18	31	
4	Mobila Ditrău	22	14	2	6	56	26	+30	30	
5	Harghita Miercurea Ciuc	22	13	2	7	55	27	+28	28	
6	Complexul Gălăuțaș	22	10	2	10	42	45	−3	22	
7	Rapid Porumbenii Mari	22	9	2	11	40	41	−1	20	
8	Șoimii Băile Tușnad	22	8	3	11	30	48	−18	19	
9	Constructorul Miercurea Ciuc	22	7	1	14	38	58	−20	15	
10	Viață Nouă Remetea	22	4	3	15	30	55	−25	11	
11	Bastionul Lăzarea	21	2	4	15	19	65	−46	8	
12	Spicul Ulieș	21	3	1	17	21	66	−45	7	

Rules for classification: 1) Points; 2) Goal difference; 3) Number of goals scored.
(C) Champions; (Q) Qualified for the phase indicated

=== Hunedoara County ===
Valea Jiului Series

Pos	Team	Pld	W	D	L	GF	GA	GD	Pts	Qualification or relegation
1	Minerul Uricani (Q)	18	17	0	1	58	17	+41	34	Qualification to championship final
2	Avântul Hațeg	18	13	1	4	53	19	+34	27	
3	Parângul Lonea	18	11	4	3	47	16	+31	26	
4	Preparatorul Petrila	18	9	2	7	50	35	+15	20	
5	Sănătatea Vulcan	18	7	1	10	33	53	−20	15	
6	Autobuzul Petroșani	18	5	4	9	31	43	−12	14	
7	Măgura Pui	18	6	1	11	38	45	−7	13	
8	CFR Petroșani	18	3	5	10	26	50	−24	11	
9	Preparatorul Lupeni	18	4	3	11	41	76	−35	11	
10	Hidromin Petroșani	18	4	2	12	24	47	−23	10	

Rules for classification: 1) Points; 2) Goal difference; 3) Number of goals scored.
(Q) Qualified for the phase indicated

Valea Mureșului Series

Pos	Team	Pld	W	D	L	GF	GA	GD	Pts	Qualification or relegation
1	Mecanica Orăștie (Q)	26	24	0	2	126	11	+115	48	Qualification to championship final after tie-breaker
2	Minerul Deva	26	23	2	1	116	20	+96	48	Qualification to tie-breaker
3	Constructorul Hunedoara	26	19	0	7	92	24	+68	38	
4	IMC Bârcea	26	13	5	8	66	35	+31	31	
5	Streiul Simeria Veche	26	13	2	11	51	51	0	28	
6	Voința CLF Ilia	26	12	3	11	53	47	+6	27	
7	Metalul Crișcior	26	11	3	12	50	48	+2	25	
8	Foresta Orăștie	26	12	0	14	60	79	−19	24	
9	Recolta Băcia	26	9	5	12	41	55	−14	23	
10	Constructorul Deva	26	8	3	15	43	80	−37	19	
11	Recolta Rapolt	26	8	2	16	34	92	−58	18	
12	Crișul Brad	26	5	5	16	42	100	−58	15	
13	Unirea Zam	26	6	3	17	48	122	−74	15	
14	Voința Brad	26	3	0	23	16	75	−59	6	

Rules for classification: 1) Points; 2) Goal difference; 3) Number of goals scored.
(Q) Qualified for the phase indicated

Championship tie-breaker

Mecanica Orăștie and Minerul Deva played a play-off match in order to determine the winner of Valea Mureșului Series. The match tie-breaker was played on 8 June 1983 at CFR Stadium in Simeria.

Team 1	Score	Team 2
Mecanica Orăștie	2–1	Minerul Deva

Championship final

The matches was played on 15, 19 and 23 June 1983.

Team 1	Series	Team 2	Game 1	Game 2	Game 3
Mecanica Orăștie	4–3	Minerul Uricani	3–2	1–2	1–0 (Note: The match was played on neutral ground at Hațeg.)

Mecanica Orăștie won the Hunedoara County Championship and qualify for promotion play-off in Divizia C.

=== Iași County ===
Pos	Team	Pld	W	D	L	GF	GA	GD	Pts	Qualification or relegation
1	Voința Lețcani (C, Q)	26	20	5	1	86	27	+59	45	Qualification to promotion play-off
2	Aurora Târgu Frumos	26	19	3	4	87	29	+58	41	
3	Spicul Țigănași	26	16	2	8	83	43	+40	34	
4	Fortus Iași	26	14	6	6	66	28	+38	34	
5	IJTL Iași	26	12	5	9	51	40	+11	29	
6	Olimpia Popricani	26	11	3	12	40	60	−20	25	
7	Barajul Blăgești	26	9	5	12	44	59	−15	23	
8	Terom Iași	26	10	3	13	52	74	−22	23	
9	Voința Moțca	26	9	4	13	46	61	−15	22	
10	Recolta Ruginoasa	26	9	2	15	61	66	−5	20	
11	Stejarul Sinești	26	8	2	16	40	54	−14	18	
12	Recolta Conțești	26	8	4	14	36	64	−28	18 (Note: Recolta Conțești deducted 2 points.)	
13	Mixten Iași	26	7	2	17	34	75	−41	16	
14	Siretul Hălăucești	26	4	6	16	41	98	−57	14	
15	ASA Iași (Note: ASA Iași and Integrata Pașcani withdrew during the season and all their results were canceled.) (D)	0	0	0	0	0	0	0	0	Withdrew
16	Integrata Pașcani (D)	0	0	0	0	0	0	0	0	Withdrew

Rules for classification: 1) Points; 2) Head-to-head points; 3) Head-to-head goal difference; 4) Head-to-head goals scored; 5) Head-to-head away goals scored; 6) Goal difference; 7) Goals scored.
(C) Champions; (D) Disqualified; (Q) Qualified for the phase indicated

=== Maramureș County ===
Pos	Team	Pld	W	D	L	GF	GA	GD	Pts	Qualification or relegation
1	Simared Baia Mare (C, Q)	26	19	2	5	71	27	+44	40	Qualification to promotion play-off
2	Stăruința Recea	26	17	3	6	61	26	+35	37	
3	Electrica Baia Mare	26	15	5	6	65	31	+34	35	
4	Recolta Rozavlea	26	15	3	8	53	44	+9	33	
5	Maramureșana Sighetu Marmației	26	14	3	9	57	31	+26	31	
6	Metalul Bogdan Vodă	26	14	2	10	47	42	+5	30	
7	IS Sighetu Marmației	26	12	4	10	55	37	+18	28	
8	IPP Coștiui	26	13	0	13	65	65	0	26	
9	Tractorul Satulung	26	12	2	12	51	55	−4	26	
10	Iza Dragomirești	26	11	4	11	50	54	−4	26	
11	Forestiera Câmpulung la Tisa	26	8	1	17	31	69	−38	17	
12	Olimpia Baia Mare	26	5	5	16	37	56	−19	15	
13	Voința Târgu Lăpuș (R)	26	5	4	17	27	79	−52	14 (Note: Voința Târgu Lăpuș and Recolta Cernești withdrew in the second part of the season and lost all remaining matches with 0–3.)	Relegation to Maramureș County Championship II
14	Recolta Cernești (R)	26	2	2	22	18	72	−54	6	Relegation to Maramureș County Championship II

Rules for classification: 1) Points; 2) Goal difference; 3) Number of goals scored.
(C) Champions; (Q) Qualified for the phase indicated; (R) Relegated

=== Olt County ===
Championship final

Team 1	Agg.	Team 2	1st leg	2nd leg
Comerțul Potcoava	1–2	Știința Drăgănești-Olt	1–1	0–1

Știința Drăgănești-Olt won the Olt County Championship and qualify for promotion play-off in Divizia C.

=== Prahova County ===
Pos	Team	Pld	W	D	L	GF	GA	GD	Pts	Qualification or relegation
1	Avântul Măneciu (C, Q)	34	22	5	7	76	28	+48	49	Qualification to promotion play-off
2	Sportul Muncitoresc Câmpina	34	19	7	8	64	36	+28	45	
3	Metalul Filipeștii de Pădure	34	19	6	9	49	37	+12	44	
4	IUC Ploiești	34	17	8	9	59	47	+12	42	
5	Chimistul Valea Călugărească	34	18	5	11	75	40	+35	41	
6	Victoria Florești	34	17	2	15	74	47	+27	36	
7	Precizia Breaza	34	16	3	15	58	46	+12	35	
8	Petrolistul Boldești	34	14	7	13	44	41	+3	35	
9	Geamul Scăieni	34	14	6	14	51	48	+3	34	
10	Feroemail Ploiești	34	13	6	15	60	57	+3	32	
11	Unirea Teleajen Ploiești	34	11	10	13	36	37	−1	32	
12	Știința IPG Ploiești	34	15	2	17	40	55	−15	32	
13	Voința Vărbilău	34	14	4	16	41	62	−21	32	
14	Neptun Câmpina	34	12	7	15	33	42	−9	31	
15	Metalul Vălenii de Munte	34	12	4	18	49	69	−20	28	
16	Electrica Câmpina (R)	34	7	11	16	32	61	−29	25	Relegation to Prahova County Championship II
17	Minerul Slănic (R)	34	9	4	21	31	66	−35	22	Relegation to Prahova County Championship II
18	Petrolul Teleajen Ploiești (R)	34	7	3	24	39	92	−53	17	Relegation to Prahova County Championship II

Rules for classification: 1) Points; 2) Goal difference; 3) Number of goals scored.
(C) Champions; (Q) Qualified for the phase indicated; (R) Relegated

=== Sălaj County ===
Series I

Pos	Team	Pld	W	D	L	GF	GA	GD	Pts	Qualification or relegation
1	Calmin Băbeni (Q)	22	16	4	2	68	24	+44	36	Qualification to championship final
2	Energia Sânmihaiu Almașului	22	13	4	5	47	24	+23	30	
3	Minerul Surduc	22	13	4	5	51	35	+16	30	
4	Someșul Someș-Odorhei	22	12	5	5	57	28	+29	29	
5	Progresul Bălan	22	10	5	7	46	38	+8	25	
6	Minerul Letca	22	10	4	8	73	36	+37	24	
7	Speranța Sânpetru Almașului	22	8	8	6	33	28	+5	24	
8	Luceafărul Someș-Guruslău	22	9	1	12	47	44	+3	19	
9	Unirea Hida	22	6	6	10	36	58	−22	18	
10	Recolta Agrij	22	6	5	11	47	49	−2	17	
11	Unirea Gârbou	22	3	5	14	33	82	−49	11	
12	Drum Nou Dragu	22	1	1	20	10	102	−92	3	

(Q) Qualified for the phase indicated

Series II

Pos	Team	Pld	W	D	L	GF	GA	GD	Pts	Qualification or relegation
1	Chimia Zalău (Q)	26	16	5	5	63	28	+35	37	Qualification to championship final
2	Voința Derșida	26	13	8	5	57	21	+36	34	
3	Spartac Crasna	26	16	2	8	68	37	+31	34	
4	Gloria Bobota	26	12	9	5	59	32	+27	33	
5	Recolta Sărmășag	26	12	9	5	60	35	+25	33	
6	Olimpic Bocșa	26	13	6	7	61	41	+20	32	
7	Izolatorul Armătura Șimleu Silvaniei	26	11	3	12	48	37	+11	25	
8	Unirea Hereclean	26	8	6	12	42	52	−10	22	
9	Avântul Lompirt	26	8	6	12	39	58	−19	22	
10	Minerul Sighetu Silvaniei	26	9	4	13	46	68	−22	22	
11	Recolta Zăuan	26	8	5	13	40	59	−19	21	
12	Recolta Crișeni	26	6	6	14	41	74	−33	18	
13	Tractorul Nușfalău	26	9	0	17	45	84	−39	18	
14	Unirea Vârșolț	26	5	3	18	33	76	−43	13	

(Q) Qualified for the phase indicated

Championship final

The match was played on 12 June 1983 at 23 August Stadium in Zalău.

Team 1	Score	Team 2
Chimia Zalău	1–0	Calmin Băbeni

Chimia Zalău won the Sălaj County Championship and qualify to promotion play-off in Divizia C.

=== Sibiu County ===
Pos	Team	Pld	W	D	L	GF	GA	GD	Pts	Qualification or relegation
1	Unirea Ocna Sibiului (C, Q)	30	22	6	2	78	9	+69	50	Qualification to promotion play-off
2	Metalul Copșa Mică	30	23	4	3	79	17	+62	50	
3	Mecanica Sibiu	30	16	4	10	43	37	+6	36	
4	Automecanica Mediaș	30	14	5	11	42	37	+5	33	
5	Sparta Mediaș	30	13	7	10	37	39	−2	33	
6	Metalul IO Sibiu	30	15	2	13	44	47	−3	32	
7	Construcții Sibiu	30	12	7	11	31	23	+8	31	
8	Firul Roșu Tălmaciu	30	13	2	15	41	40	+1	28	
9	Carbosin Copșa Mică	30	11	5	14	35	47	−12	27	
10	Record Mediaș	30	10	6	14	35	44	−9	26	
11	Relee Mediaș	30	9	8	13	45	60	−15	26	
12	Progresul Dumbrăveni	30	11	3	16	51	58	−7	25	
13	CSU-TCI Sibiu	30	9	7	14	40	50	−10	25	
14	CFR Sibiu	30	8	6	16	50	73	−23	22	
15	Amortizorul Sibiu	30	9	3	18	30	50	−20	21	
16	Textila Mediaș	30	5	5	20	15	65	−50	15	

Rules for classification: 1) Points; 2) Goal difference; 3) Number of goals scored.
(C) Champions; (Q) Qualified for the phase indicated

=== Suceava County ===
Series I

Pos	Team	Pld	W	D	L	GF	GA	GD	Pts	Qualification or relegation
1	Filatura Fălticeni (Q)	26	19	4	3	87	31	+56	42	Qualification to championship final
2	Minerul Crucea	26	18	3	5	72	30	+42	39	
3	Victoria Păltinoasa	26	12	5	9	56	55	+1	29	
4	Fuiorul Cornu Luncii	26	12	3	11	62	54	+8	27	
5	Recolta Bosanci	26	12	3	11	62	54	+8	27	
6	Bistrița Broșteni	26	10	7	9	40	46	−6	27	
7	Viitorul Câmpulung Moldovenesc	26	10	5	11	51	44	+7	25	
8	Sportul Muncitoresc Pojorâta	26	10	3	13	47	51	−4	23	
9	Minerul Fundu Moldovei	26	10	3	13	47	51	−4	23	
10	Constructorul Suceava	26	11	0	15	49	48	+1	22	
11	Gloria Măzănăești	26	9	4	13	34	55	−21	22	
12	Foresta Moldovița	26	7	7	12	38	46	−8	21	
13	Minerul Iacobeni	26	7	6	13	49	93	−44	20	
14	Bradul Vama	26	5	7	14	38	74	−36	17	

(Q) Qualified for the phase indicated

Series II

Pos	Team	Pld	W	D	L	GF	GA	GD	Pts	Qualification or relegation
1	Avântul Gălănești (Q)	26	18	1	7	80	31	+49	37	Qualification to championship final
2	Avântul Bădeuți	26	15	3	8	44	25	+19	33	
3	Recolta Volovăț	26	15	1	10	48	45	+3	31	
4	Recolta Fântânele	26	14	2	10	61	38	+23	30	
5	Avântul Todirești	26	12	4	10	46	33	+13	28	
6	Bucovina Calafindești	26	12	3	11	48	42	+6	27	
7	Viitorul Verești	26	12	2	12	42	38	+4	26	
8	Siretul Dolhasca	26	12	2	12	43	54	−11	26	
9	Constructorul Dărmănești	26	12	2	12	52	63	−11	26	
10	Avântul Grămești	26	10	3	13	43	57	−14	23	
11	Viitorul Arbore	26	9	3	14	42	54	−12	21	
12	Victoria Solca	26	10	0	16	42	49	−7	20	
13	Moldova Drăgușeni	26	7	5	14	34	62	−28	19	
14	Locomotiva Dornești	26	7	3	16	22	56	−34	17	

(Q) Qualified for the phase indicated

Championship final

The matches was played on 5 and 12 June 1983.

Team 1	Agg.	Team 2	1st leg	2nd leg
Filatura Fălticeni	1–3	Avântul Gălănești	1–1	0–2

Avântul Gălănești won the Suceava County Championship and qualify to promotion play-off in Divizia C.

== See also ==
- 1982–83 Divizia A
- 1982–83 Divizia B
- 1982–83 Divizia C
- 1982–83 Cupa României
