= 1981–82 Divizia C =

Third tier Romanian football league

Divizia C
- Season: 1981–82

The 1981–82 Divizia C was the 26th season of Liga III, the third tier of the Romanian football league system.

== Team changes ==
=== To Divizia C ===
Relegated from Divizia B

- CSM Borzești
- ROVA Roșiori
- Metalul Aiud
- Minerul Gura Humorului
- Poiana Câmpina
- Metalurgistul Cugir
- Cimentul Medgidia
- Nitramonia Făgăraș
- Minerul Moldova Nouă
- Chimia Brăila
- Sirena București
- Minerul Anina

Promoted from County Championship

- Integrata Pașcani
- Rapid Panciu
- Metalul Huși
- Minerul Filipeștii de Pădure
- ASA Chimia Buzău
- Autobuzul Făurei
- Granitul Babadag
- Dinamo Victoria București
- Petrolul Roata de Jos
- Dunărea Venus Zimnicea
- Constructorul Pitești
- Chimia Găești
- Parângul Novaci
- Mecanica Alba Iulia
- Minerul Aninoasa
- Bihorul Beiuș
- Chimia Arad
- Chimia Tășnad
- Silvania Cehu Silvaniei
- Bradul Vișeu de Sus
- Metalotehnica Târgu Mureș
- Unirea Cristuru Secuiesc
- Utilajul Făgăraș
- Metalul Sfântu Gheorghe

=== From Divizia C ===
Promoted to Divizia B

- Constructorul Iași
- Relonul Săvinești
- Victoria Tecuci
- Dunărea Călărași
- Automatica București
- Energie Slatina
- Drobeta-Turnu Severin
- Strungul Arad
- Someșul Satu Mare
- Minerul Ilba-Seini
- Carpați Mârșa
- ICIM Brașov

Relegated to County Championship

- Zimbrul Suceava
- Unirea Siret
- FEPA 74 Bârlad
- Hușana Huși
- Dacia Unirea Brăila
- Tractorul Viziru
- Electrica Constanța
- Unirea Eforie Nord
- Voința București
- Petrolul Bolintin-Vale
- Petrolul Târgoviște
- IPC Slatina
- Progresul Băilești
- Victoria Craiova
- CPL Caransebeș
- Metalul Oțelu Roșu
- Victoria Elcond Zalău
- Metalul Carei
- Silvicultorul Maieru
- Electrozahăr Târgu Mureș
- Metalul Copșa Mică
- Construcții Sibiu
- Constructorul Sfântu Gheorghe
- CSU Brașov

=== Renamed teams ===
Dorna Vatra Dornei was renamed Minerul Vatra Dornei.

Rapid Panciu was renamed Viticultorul Panciu.

Olimpia Râmnicu Sărat was renamed Ferodoul Râmnicu Sărat.

Chimia Buzău was renamed ASA Chimia Buzău.

Șantierul Naval Brăila was renamed Șantierul Naval ITA Brăila.

Sirena București was renamed during the winter break Aversa București.

CPL Sebeș was renamed Șurianu Sebeș.

Șoimii Strungul Lipova was renamed Șoimii Lipova

=== Other changes ===
Victoria Tecuci took the place of Oțelul Galați in Divizia B.

Metalosport Galați took the place of Victoria Tecuci.

Arrubium Măcin took the place of Viitorul Mahmudia.

ICIM Ploiești was moved during the winter break from Ploiești to Mizil and was renamed ASA Mizil.

Minerul Râmnicu Vâlcea was moved from Râmnicu Vâlcea to Horezu and was renamed Minerul Horezu.

CFR Caransebeș and Victoria Caransebeș merged, the second one being absorbed by the first one and was renamed as CFR Victoria Caransebeș.

== League tables ==
=== Seria I ===
Pos	Team	Pld	W	D	L	GF	GA	GD	Pts	Promotion or relegation
1	Minerul Gura Humorului (C, P)	30	19	4	7	67	25	+42	42 (Note: The matches from last round, Minerul Gura Humorului – Cristalul Dorohoi (9–1) and Cetatea Târgu Neamț – CFR Pașcani (0–14) were lost by all four teams with 0–3)	Promotion to Divizia B
2	CFR Pașcani	30	19	4	7	62	25	+37	42	
3	Tepro Iași	30	15	6	9	50	35	+15	36	
4	Foresta Fălticeni	30	14	5	11	57	41	+16	33	
5	Minerul Vatra Dornei	30	13	7	10	44	39	+5	33	
6	Metalul Botoșani	30	13	6	11	42	36	+6	32	
7	Metalul Rădăuți	30	15	2	13	51	51	0	32	
8	ASA Câmpulung Moldovenesc	30	12	6	12	39	35	+4	30	
9	Celuloza Piatra Neamț	30	13	2	15	42	50	−8	28	
10	Avântul TCMM Frasin	30	11	5	14	48	51	−3	27	
11	Siretul Bucecea	30	13	1	16	43	53	−10	27	
12	Cristalul Dorohoi	30	10	7	13	42	58	−16	27	
13	Nicolina Iași	30	9	9	12	28	44	−16	27	
14	Cetatea Târgu Neamț	30	11	4	15	37	47	−10	26	
15	Cimentul Bicaz (R)	30	7	9	14	34	50	−16	23	Relegation to County Championship
16	Integrata Pașcani (R)	30	4	3	23	28	86	−58	11	Relegation to County Championship

Source: romaniansoccer.ro
Rules for classification: 1) points; 2) goal difference; 3) number of goals scored.
(C) Champions; (P) Promoted; (R) Relegated

=== Seria II ===
Pos	Team	Pld	W	D	L	GF	GA	GD	Pts	Promotion or relegation
1	CSM Borzești (C, P)	30	20	3	7	76	21	+55	43	Promotion to Divizia B
2	Laminorul Roman	30	18	5	7	52	24	+28	41	
3	Partizanul Bacău	30	17	3	10	62	34	+28	37	
4	Letea Bacău	30	14	9	7	49	30	+19	37	
5	Victoria IRA Bacău	30	15	7	8	40	25	+15	37	
6	Petrolul Moinești	30	15	4	11	56	30	+26	34	
7	Energia Gheorghiu-Dej	30	13	4	13	44	37	+7	30	
8	Viticultorul Panciu	30	12	5	13	58	68	−10	29	
9	Luceafărul Adjud	30	11	6	13	33	39	−6	28	
10	Minerul Comănești	30	11	5	14	38	32	+6	27	
11	Rulmentul Bârlad	30	11	5	14	26	41	−15	27	
12	Foresta Gugești	30	11	4	15	47	53	−6	26	
13	Gloria Focșani	30	11	4	15	38	51	−13	26	
14	Demar Mărășești	30	11	4	15	37	63	−26	26	
15	Textila Buhuși (R)	30	12	1	17	40	60	−20	25	Relegation to County Championship
16	Metalul Huși (R)	30	3	1	26	9	97	−88	7 (Note: Metalul Huși withdrew before the start of second part of the season and lost all remaining matches with 0–3.)	Relegation to County Championship

Source: romaniansoccer.ro
Rules for classification: 1) points; 2) goal difference; 3) number of goals scored.
(C) Champions; (P) Promoted; (R) Relegated

=== Seria III ===
Pos	Team	Pld	W	D	L	GF	GA	GD	Pts	Promotion or relegation
1	Prahova Ploiești (C, P)	30	20	4	6	69	22	+47	44	Promotion to Divizia B
2	Poiana Câmpina	30	16	6	8	65	38	+27	38	
3	Chimia Brazi	30	15	7	8	57	31	+26	37	
4	ASA Mizil	30	16	4	10	36	28	+8	36	
5	Ferodoul Râmnicu Sărat	30	12	6	12	42	36	+6	30	
6	Minerul Filipeștii de Pădure	30	12	5	13	41	35	+6	29	
7	ASA Chimia Buzău	30	12	5	13	45	49	−4	29	
8	Metalul Mija	30	11	6	13	43	41	+2	28	
9	Carpați Sinaia	30	12	4	14	35	39	−4	28	
10	Carpați Nehoiu	30	13	2	15	45	54	−9	28	
11	Petrolul Băicoi	30	11	6	13	38	47	−9	28	
12	Șantierul Naval ITA Brăila	30	11	5	14	41	65	−24	27	
13	Chimia Brăila	30	11	4	15	39	37	+2	26	
14	Caraimanul Bușteni	30	9	8	13	32	41	−9	26	
15	Petrolul Berca (R)	30	12	2	16	41	52	−11	26	Relegation to County Championship
16	Autobuzul Făurei (R)	30	8	4	18	20	74	−54	20	Relegation to County Championship

Source: romaniansoccer.ro
Rules for classification: 1) points; 2) goal difference; 3) number of goals scored.
(C) Champions; (P) Promoted; (R) Relegated

=== Seria IV ===
Pos	Team	Pld	W	D	L	GF	GA	GD	Pts	Promotion or relegation
1	Metalosport Galați (C, P)	30	17	7	6	81	31	+50	41	Promotion to Divizia B
2	Portul Constanța	30	18	3	9	62	25	+37	39	
3	Rapid Fetești	30	16	5	9	45	29	+16	37	
4	Cimentul Medgidia	30	16	3	11	66	33	+33	35	
5	Voința Constanța	30	12	8	10	44	38	+6	32	
6	Șantierul Naval Tulcea	30	14	3	13	48	46	+2	31	
7	Arrubium Măcin	30	13	4	13	40	66	−26	30	
8	Ancora Galați	30	12	5	13	48	44	+4	29	
9	Granitul Babadag	30	13	3	14	28	54	−26	29	
10	Metalul Mangalia	30	13	2	15	37	38	−1	28	
11	Progresul Isaccea	30	13	2	15	48	59	−11	28	
12	Chimpex Constanța	30	10	7	13	40	43	−3	27	
13	Victoria Țăndărei	30	11	5	14	33	44	−11	27	
14	Avântul Matca	30	11	5	14	32	49	−17	27	
15	Șoimii Cernavodă (R)	30	10	4	16	38	54	−16	24	Relegation to County Championship
16	Marina Mangalia (R)	30	6	4	20	21	58	−37	16	Relegation to County Championship

Source: romaniansoccer.ro
Rules for classification: 1) points; 2) goal difference; 3) number of goals scored.
(C) Champions; (P) Promoted; (R) Relegated

=== Seria V ===
Pos	Team	Pld	W	D	L	GF	GA	GD	Pts	Promotion or relegation
1	Dinamo Victoria București (C, P)	30	21	7	2	69	23	+46	49	Promotion to Divizia B
2	ICSIM București	30	12	9	9	42	32	+10	33	
3	Aversa București	30	15	2	13	61	49	+12	32	
4	TMB București	30	15	2	13	43	36	+7	32	
5	Șantierul Naval Oltenița	30	11	9	10	37	37	0	31	
6	Abatorul București	30	11	8	11	48	42	+6	30	
7	Amonil Slobozia	30	11	8	11	27	32	−5	30	
8	Tehnometal București	30	11	7	12	36	34	+2	29	
9	Flacăra Roșie București	30	13	3	14	41	40	+1	29	
10	Danubiana București	30	10	9	11	32	35	−3	29	
11	Constructorul Călărași	30	11	5	14	45	43	+2	27	
12	FCM Giurgiu	30	12	3	15	35	43	−8	27	
13	Viitorul Chirnogi	30	12	3	15	32	53	−21	27	
14	Ferom Urziceni	30	11	4	15	37	53	−16	26	
15	Petrolul Roata de Jos (R)	30	11	4	15	37	60	−23	26	Relegation to County Championship
16	Electronica Obor București (R)	30	9	5	16	37	47	−10	23	Relegation to County Championship

Source: romaniansoccer.ro
Rules for classification: 1) points; 2) goal difference; 3) number of goals scored.
(C) Champions; (P) Promoted; (R) Relegated

=== Seria VI ===
Pos	Team	Pld	W	D	L	GF	GA	GD	Pts	Promotion or relegation
1	Rova Roșiorii de Vede (C, P)	30	21	1	8	57	29	+28	43	Promotion to Divizia B
2	Muscelul Câmpulung	30	16	5	9	48	27	+21	37	
3	Chimia Turnu Măgurele	30	16	2	12	46	29	+17	34	
4	Cimentul Fieni	30	15	3	12	43	43	0	33	
5	Dunărea Venus Zimnicea	30	15	3	12	36	44	−8	33	
6	Petrolul Videle	30	12	6	12	43	42	+1	30	
7	Cetatea Turnu Măgurele	30	13	4	13	39	48	−9	30	
8	Recolta Stoicănești	30	11	7	12	38	39	−1	29	
9	Dacia Pitești	30	13	2	15	35	30	+5	28	
10	Sportul Muncitoresc Caracal	30	12	4	14	33	34	−1	28	
11	Progresul Corabia	30	10	7	13	33	37	−4	27	
12	Electronistul Curtea de Argeș	30	11	4	15	37	42	−5	26	
13	Constructorul Pitești	30	12	2	16	37	44	−7	26	
14	Chimia Găești	30	10	6	14	44	63	−19	26	
15	Unirea Răcari (R)	30	7	11	12	33	40	−7	25	Relegation to County Championship
16	Progresul Pucioasa (R)	30	11	3	16	37	48	−11	25	Relegation to County Championship

Source: romaniansoccer.ro
Rules for classification: 1) points; 2) goal difference; 3) number of goals scored.
(C) Champions; (P) Promoted; (R) Relegated

=== Seria VII ===
Pos	Team	Pld	W	D	L	GF	GA	GD	Pts	Promotion or relegation
1	Minerul Motru (C, P)	30	19	4	7	68	28	+40	42	Promotion to Divizia B
2	Electroputere Craiova	30	17	5	8	57	20	+37	39	
3	Dierna Orșova	30	17	3	10	38	38	0	37	
4	Constructorul TCI Craiova	30	14	7	9	36	31	+5	35	
5	CFR Craiova	30	15	2	13	44	31	+13	32	
6	Minerul Moldova Nouă	30	13	5	12	41	35	+6	31	
7	Unirea Drobeta-Turnu Severin	30	13	4	13	47	44	+3	30	
8	Mecanizatorul Șimian	30	11	6	13	47	60	−13	28	
9	Minerul Oravița	30	13	1	16	48	37	+11	27	
10	Minerul Horezu	30	11	5	14	33	41	−8	27	
11	Viitorul Drăgășani	30	13	1	16	31	47	−16	27	
12	Metalurgistul Sadu	30	11	4	15	36	45	−9	26	
13	Dunărea Calafat	30	12	2	16	35	53	−18	26	
14	Jiul Rovinari	30	12	2	16	26	38	−12	26	
15	Parângul Novaci (R)	30	13	0	17	41	62	−21	26	Relegation to County Championship
16	IOB Balș (R)	30	9	3	18	30	48	−18	21	Relegation to County Championship

Source: romaniansoccer.ro
Rules for classification: 1) points; 2) goal difference; 3) number of goals scored.
(C) Champions; (P) Promoted; (R) Relegated

=== Seria VIII ===
Pos	Team	Pld	W	D	L	GF	GA	GD	Pts	Promotion or relegation
1	Metalurgistul Cugir (C, P)	30	20	2	8	64	24	+40	42	Promotion to Divizia B
2	Explormin Deva	30	17	3	10	55	31	+24	37	
3	Minerul Certej	30	14	4	12	48	32	+16	32	
4	Șurianu Sebeș	30	14	3	13	45	43	+2	31	
5	Minerul Știința Vulcan	30	13	4	13	47	41	+6	30	
6	Minerul Paroșeni	30	11	8	11	41	36	+5	30	
7	Lotru Brezoi	30	13	4	13	41	42	−1	30	
8	Victoria Călan	30	12	5	13	35	27	+8	29	
9	Mecanica Alba Iulia	30	13	3	14	46	48	−2	29	
10	CFR Simeria	30	12	5	13	26	35	−9	29	
11	Minerul Aninoasa	30	12	5	13	26	39	−13	29	
12	Textila Cisnădie	30	14	1	15	35	53	−18	29	
13	IMIX Agnita	30	12	4	14	34	33	+1	28	
14	Minerul Ghelar	30	12	4	14	44	47	−3	28	
15	Vitrometan Mediaș (R)	30	11	4	15	30	52	−22	26	Relegation to County Championship
16	Automecanica Mediaș (R)	30	9	3	18	24	58	−34	21	Relegation to County Championship

Source: romaniansoccer.ro
Rules for classification: 1) points; 2) goal difference; 3) number of goals scored.
(C) Champions; (P) Promoted; (R) Relegated

=== Seria IX ===
Pos	Team	Pld	W	D	L	GF	GA	GD	Pts	Promotion or relegation
1	Gloria Reșița (C, P)	30	18	3	9	56	31	+25	39	Promotion to Divizia B
2	CFR Arad	30	16	5	9	50	39	+11	37	
3	Minerul Anina	30	16	2	12	69	35	+34	34	
4	Șoimii Lipova	30	15	4	11	45	35	+10	34	
5	Voința Oradea	30	15	3	12	51	41	+10	33	
6	Electromotor Timișoara	30	14	4	12	59	49	+10	32	
7	Oțelul Bihor	30	12	7	11	41	35	+6	31	
8	Victoria Ineu	30	15	1	14	43	52	−9	31	
9	Unirea Sânnicolau Mare	30	14	2	14	53	48	+5	30	
10	Unirea Tomnatic	30	13	4	13	40	37	+3	30	
11	Metalul Bocșa	30	12	6	12	28	56	−28	30	
12	Bihorul Beiuș	30	12	5	13	43	46	−3	29	
13	CFR Victoria Caransebeș	30	13	2	15	40	51	−11	28	
14	Vulturii Textila Lugoj	30	11	3	16	47	56	−9	25	
15	Chimia Arad (R)	30	6	7	17	38	68	−30	19	Relegation to County Championship
16	Recolta Salonta (R)	30	7	4	19	32	56	−24	18	Relegation to County Championship

Source: romaniansoccer.ro
Rules for classification: 1) points; 2) goal difference; 3) number of goals scored.
(C) Champions; (P) Promoted; (R) Relegated

=== Seria X ===
Pos	Team	Pld	W	D	L	GF	GA	GD	Pts	Promotion or relegation
1	Armătura Zalău (C, P)	30	20	2	8	70	26	+44	42	Promotion to Divizia B
2	Victoria Carei	30	18	2	10	53	30	+23	38	
3	Unirea Valea lui Mihai	30	15	4	11	69	40	+29	34	
4	Bradul Vișeu de Sus	30	14	3	13	40	37	+3	31	
5	Minerul Băița	30	14	3	13	35	42	−7	31	
6	Minerul Băiuț	30	14	4	12	56	45	+11	30 (Note: Minerul Băiuț deducted 2 points.)	
7	Minerul Baia Sprie	30	12	6	12	54	47	+7	30	
8	Cuprom Baia Mare	30	13	4	13	47	42	+5	30	
9	Oașul Negrești-Oaș	30	13	4	13	44	40	+4	30	
10	Bihoreana Marghita	30	12	5	13	42	48	−6	29	
11	Chimia Tășnad	30	12	4	14	39	45	−6	28	
12	Silvania Cehu Silvaniei	30	12	3	15	48	56	−8	27	
13	Minerul Baia Borșa	30	12	3	15	42	57	−15	27	
14	Rapid Jibou	30	12	3	15	31	68	−37	27	
15	Tricolorul Oradea (R)	30	10	3	17	32	46	−14	23	Relegation to County Championship
16	Simared Baia Mare (R)	30	9	3	18	22	55	−33	21	Relegation to County Championship

Source: romaniansoccer.ro
Rules for classification: 1) points; 2) goal difference; 3) number of goals scored.
(C) Champions; (P) Promoted; (R) Relegated

=== Seria XI ===
Pos	Team	Pld	W	D	L	GF	GA	GD	Pts	Promotion or relegation
1	Industria Sârmei Câmpia Turzii (C, P)	30	18	6	6	56	21	+35	42	Promotion to Divizia B
2	Unirea Alba Iulia	30	15	7	8	61	33	+28	37	
3	Sticla Arieșul Turda	30	15	4	11	47	35	+12	34	
4	Avântul Reghin	30	14	5	11	37	30	+7	33	
5	Metalul Aiud	30	12	8	10	47	34	+13	32	
6	Minerul Rodna	30	14	4	12	53	45	+8	32	
7	Lăpușul Târgu Lăpuș	30	14	4	12	39	39	0	32	
8	Metalul Sighișoara	30	13	3	14	39	47	−8	29	
9	Foresta Bistrița	30	13	2	15	40	59	−19	28	
10	Metalotehnica Târgu Mureș	30	13	2	15	37	39	−2	28	
11	Construcții Electrometal Cluj-Napoca	30	9	9	12	40	42	−2	27	
12	Oțelul Reghin	30	10	7	13	38	47	−9	27	
13	Mureșul Luduș	30	8	10	12	37	42	−5	26	
14	Textila Năsăud	30	11	4	15	32	49	−17	26	
15	CIL Blaj (R)	30	9	7	14	20	44	−24	25	Relegation to County Championship
16	Unirea Dej (R)	30	9	4	17	44	61	−17	22	Relegation to County Championship

Source: romaniansoccer.ro
Rules for classification: 1) points; 2) goal difference; 3) number of goals scored.
(C) Champions; (P) Promoted; (R) Relegated

=== Seria XII ===
Pos	Team	Pld	W	D	L	GF	GA	GD	Pts	Promotion or relegation
1	Precizia Săcele (C, P)	30	18	5	7	36	24	+12	41	Promotion to Divizia B
2	Progresul Odorheiu Secuiesc	30	18	3	9	55	27	+28	39	
3	Nitramonia Făgăraș	30	13	8	9	44	30	+14	34	
4	Mureșul Toplița	30	12	8	10	38	30	+8	32	
5	Minerul Bălan	30	14	4	12	40	67	−27	32	
6	Metrom Brașov	30	11	8	11	28	25	+3	30	
7	Tractorul Miercurea Ciuc	30	13	4	13	44	42	+2	30	
8	Chimia Orașul Victoria	30	10	8	12	32	34	−2	28	
9	Unirea Cristuru Secuiesc	30	12	4	14	39	42	−3	28	
10	Utilajul Făgăraș	30	13	2	15	29	35	−6	28	
11	Minerul Baraolt	30	12	4	14	30	47	−17	28	
12	Mobila Măgura Codlea	30	12	3	15	31	32	−1	27	
13	Metalul Sfântu Gheorghe	30	11	4	15	38	34	+4	26	
14	Torpedo Zărnești	30	10	6	14	45	44	+1	26	
15	Metalul Târgu Secuiesc (R)	30	10	6	14	28	38	−10	26	Relegation to County Championship
16	Carpați Brașov (R)	30	9	7	14	38	44	−6	25	Relegation to County Championship

Source: romaniansoccer.ro
Rules for classification: 1) points; 2) goal difference; 3) number of goals scored.
(C) Champions; (P) Promoted; (R) Relegated

== See also ==
- 1981–82 Divizia A
- 1981–82 Divizia B
- 1981–82 County Championship
- 1981–82 Cupa României
