= 1982–83 Divizia C =

Third tier Romanian football league

Divizia C
- Season: 1982–83

The 1982–83 Divizia C was the 27th season of Liga III, the third tier of the Romanian football league system.

== Team changes ==
=== To Divizia C ===
Relegated from Divizia B

- CSU Galați
- Flacăra-Automecanica Moreni
- Dacia Orăștie
- Constructorul Iași
- Metalul Plopeni
- Minerul Lupeni
- Victoria Tecuci
- Tractorul Brașov
- CFR Cluj-Napoca
- Relonul Săvinești
- ICIM Brașov
- Minerul Ilba-Seini

Promoted from County Championship

- Zimbrul Suceava
- Constructorul Sfântu Gheorghe
- AZO-TCM Săvinești
- DVA Portul Galați
- FEPA 74 Bârlad
- Metalul Buzău
- Laminorul Brăila
- Dobrogea Canal Basarabi
- ISCIP Ulmeni
- Vâscoza București
- Electrica Titu
- Petrolul Bolintin-Vale
- Progresul Topoloveni
- Armătura Strehaia
- Petrolul Țicleni
- IPC Slatina
- Inter Sibiu
- Soda Ocna Mureș
- Minerul Sărmășag
- Minerul Bihor
- Olimpia Gherla
- Sticla Bistrița
- Textila Prejmer
- Metrom Brașov

=== From Divizia C ===
Promoted to Divizia B

- Minerul Gura Humorului
- Borzești
- Prahova Ploiești
- Metalosport Galați
- Dinamo Victoria București
- Rova Roșiori
- Minerul Motru
- Metalurgistul Cugir
- Gloria Reșița
- Armătura Zalău
- Industria Sârmei Câmpia Turzii
- Precizia Săcele

Relegated to County Championship

- Cimentul Bicaz
- Integrata Pașcani
- Textila Buhuși
- Metalul Huși
- Petrolul Berca
- Autobuzul Făurei
- Șoimii Cernavodă
- Marina Mangalia
- Petrolul Roata de Jos
- Electronica Obor București
- Unirea Răcari
- Progresul Pucioasa
- Parângul Novaci
- IOB Balș
- Vitrometan Mediaș
- Automecanica Mediaș
- Chimia Arad
- Recolta Salonta
- Tricolorul Oradea
- Simared Baia Mare
- CIL Blaj
- Unirea Dej
- Metalul Târgu Secuiesc
- Carpați Brașov

=== Renamed teams ===
Foresta Fălticeni was renamed as Chimia Fălticeni.

Zimbrul Suceava was moved from Suceava to Siret and was renamed as Zimbrul Siret.

Victoria IRA Bacău was renamed as Aripile Bacău.

Metalul Sfântu Gheorghe was renamed as Electro Sfântu Gheorghe.

Foresta Gugești was renamed as Victoria Gugești.

Ferodoul Râmnicu Sărat was renamed as Olimpia Râmnicu Sărat.

Vâscoza București was renamed as Viscofil București.

CFR Victoria Caransebeș was renamed as CFR Caransebeș.

Explormin Deva was renamed as Explorări Deva.

Minerul Ilba-Seini was renamed as Unirea Seini.

=== Other changes ===
Siretul Pașcani took the place of Nicolina Iași.

Petrolul Brăila took the place of Șantierul Naval ITA Brăila.

Șoimii Cernavodă was spared from relegation due to the merge between FCM Galați and CSU Galați.

== League tables ==
=== Seria I ===
Pos	Team	Pld	W	D	L	GF	GA	GD	Pts	Promotion or relegation
1	Chimia Fălticeni (C, P)	30	19	3	8	52	21	+31	41	Promotion to Divizia B
2	Zimbrul Siret	30	15	8	7	50	31	+19	38	
3	CFR Pașcani	30	14	7	9	44	28	+16	33 (Note: CFR Pașcani, Cetatea Târgu Neamț and Cristalul Dorohoi were deducted 2 points)	
4	Siretul Bucecea	30	14	4	12	36	36	0	32	
5	ASA Câmpulung Moldovenesc	30	13	3	14	36	40	−4	29	
6	Laminorul Roman	30	13	3	14	32	40	−8	29	
7	Siretul Pașcani	30	14	1	15	43	56	−13	29	
8	Metalul Rădăuți	30	13	2	15	42	38	+4	28	
9	Constructorul Iași	30	11	6	13	42	39	+3	28	
10	Minerul Vatra Dornei	30	12	4	14	41	44	−3	28	
11	Cetatea Târgu Neamț	30	13	4	13	38	42	−4	28	
12	Cristalul Dorohoi	30	13	4	13	39	44	−5	28	
13	Celuloza Piatra Neamț	30	10	8	12	36	45	−9	28	
14	Avântul TCMM Frasin	30	12	4	14	37	47	−10	28	
15	Tepro Iași (R)	30	9	8	13	37	40	−3	26	Relegation to County Championship
16	Metalul Botoșani (R)	30	9	3	18	29	43	−14	21	Relegation to County Championship

Source: romaniansoccer.ro
Rules for classification: 1) points; 2) goal difference; 3) number of goals scored.
(C) Champions; (P) Promoted; (R) Relegated

=== Seria II ===
Pos	Team	Pld	W	D	L	GF	GA	GD	Pts	Promotion or relegation
1	Partizanul Bacău (C, P)	30	19	4	7	69	32	+37	42	Promotion to Divizia B
2	Aripile Bacău	30	14	8	8	58	29	+29	36	
3	Petrolul Moinești	30	14	6	10	53	32	+21	34	
4	Gloria Focșani	30	16	1	13	41	32	+9	33	
5	Minerul Comănești	30	14	4	12	35	33	+2	32	
6	Minerul Baraolt	30	14	4	12	44	43	+1	32	
7	Electro Sfântu Gheorghe	30	12	5	13	41	48	−7	29	
8	Viticultorul Panciu	30	12	4	14	42	42	0	28	
9	Luceafărul Adjud	30	10	8	12	32	48	−16	28	
10	Relonul Săvinești	30	15	7	8	47	33	+14	27 (Note: Relonul Săvinești deducted 10 points.)	
11	Energia Gheorghe Gheorghiu-Dej	30	13	1	16	46	45	+1	27	
12	Letea Bacău	30	12	3	15	46	47	−1	27	
13	Demar Mărășești	30	12	3	15	47	51	−4	27	
14	Victoria Gugești	30	12	3	15	40	63	−23	27	
15	Constructorul Sfântu Gheorghe (R)	30	12	2	16	41	52	−11	26	Relegation to County Championship
16	AZO-TCM Săvinești (R)	30	7	1	22	30	82	−52	15 (Note: AZO-TCM Săvinești was excluded from championship.)	Relegation to County Championship

Source: romaniansoccer.ro
Rules for classification: 1) points; 2) goal difference; 3) number of goals scored.
(C) Champions; (P) Promoted; (R) Relegated

=== Seria III ===
Pos	Team	Pld	W	D	L	GF	GA	GD	Pts	Promotion or relegation
1	Olimpia Râmnicu Sărat (C, P)	30	21	4	5	61	29	+32	46	Promotion to Divizia B
2	Chimia Brăila	30	18	4	8	67	32	+35	40	
3	Carpați Nehoiu	30	16	4	10	63	38	+25	36	
4	Arrubium Măcin	30	15	5	10	57	34	+23	35	
5	DVA Portul Galați	30	13	7	10	49	48	+1	33	
6	Victoria Tecuci	30	13	4	13	50	45	+5	30	
7	Petrolul Brăila	30	12	6	12	41	43	−2	30	
8	Chimia Buzău	30	11	7	12	49	39	+10	29	
9	Metalul Buzău	30	13	2	15	50	48	+2	28	
10	Laminorul Brăila	30	10	7	13	33	39	−6	27	
11	Șantierul Naval Tulcea	30	11	5	14	33	49	−16	27	
12	Progresul Isaccea	30	12	3	15	45	65	−20	27	
13	Ancora Galați	30	9	8	13	44	47	−3	26	
14	FEPA 74 Bârlad	30	11	4	15	35	57	−22	26	
15	Avântul Matca (R)	30	9	3	18	36	56	−20	21	Relegation to County Championship
16	Rulmentul Bârlad (R)	30	8	3	19	21	65	−44	19	Relegation to County Championship

Source: romaniansoccer.ro
Rules for classification: 1) points; 2) goal difference; 3) number of goals scored.
(C) Champions; (P) Promoted; (R) Relegated

=== Seria IV ===
Pos	Team	Pld	W	D	L	GF	GA	GD	Pts	Promotion or relegation
1	Unirea Slobozia (C, P)	30	21	2	7	70	21	+49	44	Promotion to Divizia B
2	Șantierul Naval Oltenița	30	20	4	6	63	22	+41	44	
3	Portul Constanța	30	18	3	9	77	32	+45	39	
4	Cimentul Medgidia	30	12	8	10	48	38	+10	32	
5	Voința Constanța	30	12	7	11	49	44	+5	31	
6	Viitorul Chirnogi	30	14	3	13	42	45	−3	31	
7	Ferom Urziceni	30	14	2	14	50	47	+3	30	
8	Metalul Mangalia	30	11	8	11	34	41	−7	30	
9	Victoria Țăndărei	30	10	10	10	34	44	−10	30	
10	Rapid Fetești	30	12	5	13	47	50	−3	29	
11	Constructorul Călărași	30	12	4	14	41	43	−2	28	
12	Chimpex Constanța	30	10	6	14	32	42	−10	26	
13	Șoimii Cernavodă	30	11	4	15	30	53	−23	26	
14	ISCIP Ulmeni	30	10	5	15	35	54	−19	25	
15	Granitul Babadag (R)	30	9	7	14	32	61	−29	25	Relegation to County Championship
16	Dobrogea Canal Basarabi (R)	30	2	6	22	15	62	−47	10 (Note: Dobrogea Canal Basarabi was excluded from championship.)	Relegation to County Championship

Source: romaniansoccer.ro
Rules for classification: 1) points; 2) goal difference; 3) number of goals scored.
(C) Champions; (P) Promoted; (R) Relegated

=== Seria V ===
Pos	Team	Pld	W	D	L	GF	GA	GD	Pts	Promotion or relegation
1	Metalul Plopeni (C, P)	30	17	7	6	48	22	+26	41	Promotion to Divizia B
2	Viscofil București	30	13	10	7	29	24	+5	36	
3	Aversa București	30	13	5	12	45	44	+1	31	
4	ICSIM București	30	10	10	10	46	28	+18	30	
5	Flacăra Roșie București	30	12	6	12	36	33	+3	30	
6	Tehnometal București	30	12	6	12	35	35	0	30	
7	ASA Mizil	30	14	2	14	38	45	−7	30	
8	Danubiana București	30	12	6	12	34	42	−8	30	
9	Abatorul București	30	11	7	12	36	37	−1	29	
10	Petrolul Băicoi	30	13	3	14	38	49	−11	29	
11	Chimia Brazi	30	12	4	14	39	35	+4	28	
12	Poiana Câmpina	30	12	4	14	39	35	+4	28	
13	Minerul Filipeștii de Pădure	30	11	6	13	30	32	−2	28	
14	Carpați Sinaia	30	10	7	13	39	41	−2	27	
15	TMB București (R)	30	10	7	13	37	44	−7	27	Relegation to County Championship
16	Caraimanul Bușteni (R)	30	11	4	15	28	51	−23	26	Relegation to County Championship

Source: romaniansoccer.ro
Rules for classification: 1) points; 2) goal difference; 3) number of goals scored.
(C) Champions; (P) Promoted; (R) Relegated

=== Seria VI ===
Pos	Team	Pld	W	D	L	GF	GA	GD	Pts	Promotion or relegation
1	Chimia Turnu Măgurele (C, P)	30	18	4	8	55	28	+27	40	Promotion to Divizia B
2	Dacia Pitești	30	14	8	8	51	29	+22	36	
3	Flacăra-Automecanica Moreni	30	13	8	9	43	31	+12	34	
4	Metalul Mija	30	17	0	13	43	37	+6	34	
5	Electrica Titu	30	15	3	12	43	33	+10	33	
6	Muscelul Câmpulung	30	14	4	12	44	31	+13	32	
7	Petrolul Videle	30	14	4	12	47	38	+9	32	
8	Dunărea Venus Zimnicea	30	12	7	11	33	36	−3	31	
9	Chimia Găești	30	14	3	13	36	45	−9	31	
10	Cimentul Fieni	30	14	2	14	38	40	−2	30	
11	Electronistul Curtea de Argeș	30	12	6	12	37	43	−6	30	
12	Cetatea Turnu Măgurele	30	12	4	14	44	42	+2	28	
13	Petrolul Bolintin-Vale	30	11	5	14	35	32	+3	27	
14	FCM Giurgiu	30	12	3	15	28	35	−7	27	
15	Progresul Topoloveni (R)	30	10	5	15	33	53	−20	25	Relegation to County Championship
16	Constructorul Pitești (R)	30	4	2	24	21	78	−57	10	Relegation to County Championship

Source: romaniansoccer.ro
Rules for classification: 1) points; 2) goal difference; 3) number of goals scored.
(C) Champions; (P) Promoted; (R) Relegated

=== Seria VII ===
Pos	Team	Pld	W	D	L	GF	GA	GD	Pts	Promotion or relegation
1	Constructorul TCI Craiova (C, P)	30	18	4	8	46	27	+19	40	Promotion to Divizia B
2	Electroputere Craiova	30	16	6	8	56	25	+31	38	
3	Progresul Corabia	30	14	4	12	38	36	+2	32	
4	Armătura Strehaia	30	15	2	13	44	50	−6	32	
5	Sportul Muncitoresc Caracal	30	13	5	12	42	32	+10	31	
6	Dunărea Calafat	30	12	7	11	45	44	+1	31	
7	Metalurgistul Sadu	30	12	6	12	38	30	+8	30	
8	CFR Craiova	30	12	5	13	30	33	−3	29	
9	Viitorul Drăgășani	30	14	1	15	32	37	−5	29	
10	Lotru Brezoi	30	10	9	11	37	47	−10	29	
11	Recolta Stoicănești	30	14	0	16	53	43	+10	28	
12	Jiul Rovinari	30	12	4	14	34	38	−4	28	
13	Petrolul Țicleni	30	12	4	14	29	37	−8	28	
14	Mecanizatorul Șimian	30	12	3	15	37	46	−9	27	
15	IPC Slatina (R)	30	10	6	14	26	36	−10	26	Relegation to County Championship
16	Minerul Horezu (R)	30	10	2	18	27	53	−26	22	Relegation to County Championship

Source: romaniansoccer.ro
Rules for classification: 1) points; 2) goal difference; 3) number of goals scored.
(C) Champions; (P) Promoted; (R) Relegated

=== Seria VIII ===
Pos	Team	Pld	W	D	L	GF	GA	GD	Pts	Promotion or relegation
1	CFR Caransebeș (C, P)	30	17	5	8	55	30	+25	39	Promotion to Divizia B
2	Minerul Anina	30	18	1	11	80	36	+44	37	
3	Minerul Oravița	30	17	2	11	53	31	+22	36	
4	Șoimii Lipova	30	14	5	11	39	41	−2	33	
5	Dierna Orșova	30	16	0	14	47	49	−2	32	
6	Constructorul Timișoara	30	14	3	13	49	31	+18	31	
7	Metalul Bocșa	30	14	1	15	47	42	+5	29	
8	Unirea Sânnicolau Mare	30	13	3	14	39	37	+2	29	
9	CFR Arad	30	12	4	14	44	39	+5	28	
10	Minerul Certej	30	14	0	16	49	48	+1	28	
11	Victoria Ineu	30	14	0	16	47	50	−3	28	
12	Celuloza Drobeta-Turnu Severin	30	13	2	15	39	52	−13	28	
13	Unirea Tomnatic	30	14	0	16	33	49	−16	28	
14	Minerul Moldova Nouă	30	13	2	15	38	57	−19	28	
15	Vulturii Textila Lugoj (R)	30	11	4	15	34	61	−27	26	Relegation to County Championship
16	Frontiera Curtici (R)	30	8	4	18	25	65	−40	20	Relegation to County Championship

Source: romaniansoccer.ro
Rules for classification: 1) points; 2) goal difference; 3) number of goals scored.
(C) Champions; (P) Promoted; (R) Relegated

=== Seria IX ===
Pos	Team	Pld	W	D	L	GF	GA	GD	Pts	Promotion or relegation
1	Minerul Lupeni (C, P)	30	17	7	6	64	23	+41	41	Promotion to Divizia B
2	Explorări Deva	30	15	9	6	54	29	+25	39	
3	Dacia Orăștie	30	16	4	10	67	32	+35	36	
4	Unirea Alba Iulia	30	16	4	10	48	38	+10	36	
5	Șurianu Sebeș	30	14	5	11	51	40	+11	33	
6	Victoria Călan	30	15	3	12	34	41	−7	33	
7	Inter Sibiu	30	12	7	11	42	37	+5	31	
8	Metalul Aiud	30	13	4	13	38	29	+9	30	
9	Minerul Paroșeni	30	11	7	12	42	45	−3	29	
10	Mecanica Alba Iulia	30	12	4	14	43	44	−1	28	
11	Minerul Știința Vulcan	30	11	6	13	27	39	−12	28	
12	Minerul Aninoasa	30	11	5	14	37	55	−18	27	
13	Minerul Ghelar	30	11	4	15	38	47	−9	26	
14	Soda Ocna Mureș	30	10	5	15	38	55	−17	25	
15	CFR Simeria (R)	30	7	6	17	30	74	−44	20	Relegation to County Championship
16	Textila Cisnădie (R)	30	8	2	20	43	68	−25	18	Relegation to County Championship

Source: romaniansoccer.ro
Rules for classification: 1) points; 2) goal difference; 3) number of goals scored.
(C) Champions; (P) Promoted; (R) Relegated

=== Seria X ===
Pos	Team	Pld	W	D	L	GF	GA	GD	Pts	Promotion or relegation
1	CFR Cluj-Napoca (C, P)	30	20	3	7	64	31	+33	43	Promotion to Divizia B
2	Victoria Carei	30	17	8	5	65	20	+45	42	
3	Minerul Bihor	30	16	3	11	43	29	+14	35	
4	Sticla Arieșul Turda	30	16	2	12	72	44	+28	34	
5	Chimia Tășnad	30	13	4	13	50	53	−3	30	
6	Oașul Negrești-Oaș	30	14	2	14	39	48	−9	30	
7	Minerul Sărmășag	30	13	3	14	38	50	−12	29	
8	Oțelul Bihor	30	13	2	15	35	33	+2	28	
9	Voința Oradea	30	12	4	14	43	46	−3	28	
10	Bihoreana Marghita	30	12	3	15	43	48	−5	27	
11	Olimpia Gherla	30	11	5	14	26	35	−9	27	
12	Silvania Cehu Silvaniei	30	11	5	14	32	58	−26	27	
13	Unirea Valea lui Mihai	30	11	4	15	48	52	−4	26	
14	Construcții Electrometal Cluj-Napoca	30	10	6	14	40	46	−6	26	
15	Bihorul Beiuș (R)	30	9	7	14	38	55	−17	25	Relegation to County Championship
16	Rapid Jibou (R)	30	9	5	16	34	62	−28	23	Relegation to County Championship

Source: romaniansoccer.ro
Rules for classification: 1) points; 2) goal difference; 3) number of goals scored.
(C) Champions; (P) Promoted; (R) Relegated

=== Seria XI ===
Pos	Team	Pld	W	D	L	GF	GA	GD	Pts	Promotion or relegation
1	Avântul Reghin (C, P)	30	21	2	7	63	30	+33	44	Promotion to Divizia B
2	Minerul Baia Sprie	30	19	3	8	55	27	+28	41	
3	Metalotehnica Târgu Mureș	30	16	6	8	64	25	+39	38	
4	Mureșul Luduș	30	18	2	10	58	24	+34	38	
5	Minerul Băița	30	15	3	12	51	42	+9	33	
6	Minerul Rodna	30	15	2	13	39	27	+12	32	
7	Minerul Băiuț	30	15	2	13	45	43	+2	32	
8	Minerul Baia Borșa	30	14	2	14	42	46	−4	30	
9	Textila Năsăud	30	12	6	12	36	49	−13	30	
10	Oțelul Reghin	30	13	3	14	41	44	−3	29	
11	Cuprom Baia Mare	30	11	6	13	41	40	+1	28	
12	Foresta Bistrița	30	12	2	16	45	42	+3	26	
13	Lăpușul Târgu Lăpuș	30	12	2	16	33	44	−11	26	
14	Bradul Vișeu de Sus	30	12	2	16	34	49	−15	26	
15	Sticla Bistrița (R)	30	9	3	18	29	56	−27	21	Relegation to County Championship
16	Unirea Seini (R)	30	3	0	27	9	97	−88	6 (Note: Unirea Seini was excluded from championship.)	Relegation to County Championship

Source: romaniansoccer.ro
Rules for classification: 1) points; 2) goal difference; 3) number of goals scored.
(C) Champions; (P) Promoted; (R) Relegated

=== Seria XII ===
Pos	Team	Pld	W	D	L	GF	GA	GD	Pts	Promotion or relegation
1	Nitramonia Făgăraș (C, P)	30	20	3	7	51	14	+37	43	Promotion to Divizia B
2	Tractorul Brașov	30	19	4	7	49	16	+33	42	
3	Mobila Măgura Codlea	30	13	6	11	42	35	+7	32	
4	Metalul Sighișoara	30	15	2	13	39	33	+6	32	
5	Torpedo Zărnești	30	14	4	12	43	38	+5	32	
6	IMIX Agnita	30	14	4	12	33	31	+2	32	
7	Unirea Cristuru Secuiesc	30	12	6	12	36	47	−11	30	
8	Mureșul Toplița	30	12	4	14	37	37	0	28	
9	Minerul Bălan	30	13	2	15	31	45	−14	28	
10	Chimia Orașul Victoria	30	11	6	13	36	50	−14	28	
11	Textila Prejmer	30	11	6	13	22	38	−16	28	
12	ICIM Brașov	30	10	9	11	40	33	+7	27 (Note: ICIM Brașov deducted 2 points.)	
13	Metrom Brașov	30	10	7	13	36	33	+3	27	
14	Utilajul Făgăraș	30	12	3	15	48	46	+2	27	
15	Progresul Odorheiu Secuiesc (R)	30	10	7	13	37	42	−5	27	Relegation to County Championship
16	Tractorul Miercurea Ciuc (R)	30	5	5	20	23	65	−42	15	Relegation to County Championship

Source: romaniansoccer.ro
Rules for classification: 1) points; 2) goal difference; 3) number of goals scored.
(C) Champions; (P) Promoted; (R) Relegated

== See also ==
- 1982–83 Divizia A
- 1982–83 Divizia B
- 1982–83 County Championship
- 1982–83 Cupa României
