= 1981–82 Divizia B =

Divizia B
- Season: 1981–82
- Promoted: Politehnica Iași; Petrolul Ploiești; Bihor Oradea
- Relegated: CSU Galați; Flacăra-Automecanica Moreni; Dacia Orăștie; Constructorul Iași; Metalul Plopeni; Minerul Lupeni; Victoria Tecuci; Tractorul Brașov; CFR Cluj; Relonul Săvinești; ICIM Brașov; Minerul Ilba-Seini
- Top goalscorer: Iulius Nemțeanu (Series I, 26 goals); Ștefan Popa (Series II, 18 goals); Petre Grosu (Series III, 29 goals)

The 1981–82 Divizia B was the 42nd season of the second tier of the Romanian football league system.

The format has been maintained to three series, each of them having 18 teams. At the end of the season the winners of the series promoted to Divizia A and the last four places from each series relegated to Divizia C.

== Team changes ==
=== To Divizia B ===
Promoted from Divizia C

- Constructorul Iași
- Relonul Săvinești
- Victoria Tecuci
- Dunărea Călărași
- Automatica București
- Energie Slatina
- Drobeta-Turnu Severin
- Strungul Arad
- Someșul Satu Mare
- Minerul Ilba-Seini
- Carpați Mârșa
- ICIM Brașov

Relegated from Divizia A

- Politehnica Iași
- Baia Mare
- FCM Galați

=== From Divizia B ===
Relegated to Divizia C

- Borzești
- ROVA Roșiori
- Metalul Aiud
- Minerul Gura Humorului
- Poiana Câmpina
- Metalurgistul Cugir
- Cimentul Medgidia
- Nitramonia Făgăraș
- Minerul Moldova Nouă
- Chimia Brăila
- Sirena București
- Minerul Anina

Promoted to Divizia A

- FC Constanța
- CS Târgoviște
- UTA Arad

=== Renamed teams ===
Oltul Sfântu Gheorghe was renamed as CSM Sfântu Gheorghe.

Rulmentul Alexandria was renamed as Unirea Alexandria.

=== Other teams ===
Șoimii Sibiu and IPA Sibiu merged, the second one being absorbed by the first one. After the merge Șoimii Sibiu was renamed as Șoimii IPA Sibiu.

== League tables ==
=== Serie I ===
Pos	Team	Pld	W	D	L	GF	GA	GD	Pts	Promotion or relegation
1	Politehnica Iași (C, P)	34	21	6	7	79	37	+42	48	Promotion to Divizia A
2	Gloria Bistrița	34	17	8	9	60	25	+35	42	
3	Unirea Dinamo Focșani	34	19	4	11	48	30	+18	42	
4	CSM Suceava	34	18	5	11	68	36	+32	41	
5	Gloria Buzău	34	17	6	11	45	22	+23	40	
6	CS Botoșani	34	15	5	14	64	44	+20	35	
7	FCM Galați	34	13	9	12	50	34	+16	35	
8	IMU Medgidia	34	14	6	14	35	48	−13	34	
9	Progresul Brăila	34	12	9	13	41	38	+3	33	
10	Ceahlăul Piatra Neamț	34	13	7	14	44	44	0	33	
11	Sfântu Gheorghe	34	13	7	14	50	51	−1	33	
12	Viitorul Gheorgheni	34	13	7	14	40	44	−4	33	
13	Delta Tulcea	34	14	5	15	40	50	−10	33	
14	Viitorul Vaslui	34	15	3	16	39	50	−11	33	
15	CSU Galați (R)	34	13	5	16	47	63	−16	31	Relegation to Divizia C
16	Constructorul Iași (R)	34	11	6	17	39	64	−25	28	Relegation to Divizia C
17	Victoria Tecuci (R)	34	10	4	20	21	60	−39	24	Relegation to Divizia C
18	Relonul Săvinești (R)	34	2	10	22	22	92	−70	14	Relegation to Divizia C

Source: romaniansoccer.ro (in Romanian)
Rules for classification: 1) Points; 2) Goal difference; 3) Goals scored; 4) Head-to-head points; 5) Head-to-head goal difference; 6) Head-to-head goals scored; 7) Head-to-head away goals scored.
(C) Champions; (P) Promoted; (R) Relegated

=== Top scorers ===
The Series I top scorers:

26 goals

- (Romania) Iulius Nemțeanu (Politehnica Iași)

21 goals

- (Romania) Constantin Lala (CSU Galați)

17 goals

- (Romania) Mircea Cojocaru (CS Botoșani)

15 goals

- (Romania) Ion Petrescu (CSM Suceava)
- (Romania) Lorin Avădanei (CSM Suceava)

14 goals

- (Romania) Vasile Moga (Gloria Bistrița)

12 goals

- (Romania) Constantin Cioacă (Politehnica Iași)
- (Romania) Dorel Roșca (Ceahlăul Piatra Neamț)

11 goals

- (Romania) Vasile Simionaș (Politehnica Iași)
- (Romania) Marian Sima ((Unirea Dinamo Focșani)
- (Romania) Ferenc Bartha (Viitorul Gheorgheni)

=== Serie II ===
Pos	Team	Pld	W	D	L	GF	GA	GD	Pts	Promotion or relegation
1	Petrolul Ploiești (C, P)	34	22	8	4	61	22	+39	52	Promotion to Divizia A
2	Rapid București	34	21	8	5	76	23	+53	50	
3	Unirea Alexandria	34	17	5	12	36	30	+6	39	
4	Șoimii IPA Sibiu	34	14	9	11	40	32	+8	37	
5	Automatica București	34	15	6	13	53	57	−4	36	
6	Gaz Metan Mediaș	34	15	5	14	37	44	−7	35	
7	Dunărea Călărași	34	16	2	16	44	42	+2	34	
8	Chimica Târnăveni	34	13	7	14	35	43	−8	33	
9	Carpați Mârșa	34	12	8	14	38	43	−5	32	
10	Autobuzul București	34	15	2	17	41	48	−7	32	
11	Mecanică Fină București	34	12	8	14	36	45	−9	32	
12	Metalul București	34	11	9	14	33	32	+1	31	
13	Pandurii Târgu Jiu	34	14	3	17	53	55	−2	31	
14	Energia Slatina	34	13	5	16	35	50	−15	31	
15	Flacăra-Automecanica Moreni (R)	34	12	6	16	29	38	−9	30	Relegation to Divizia C
16	Metalul Plopeni (R)	34	12	4	18	35	42	−7	28	Relegation to Divizia C
17	Tractorul Brașov (R)	34	9	9	16	27	44	−17	27	Relegation to Divizia C
18	ICIM Brașov (R)	34	8	6	20	33	52	−19	22	Relegation to Divizia C

Source: romaniansoccer.ro (in Romanian)
Rules for classification: 1) Points; 2) Goal difference; 3) Goals scored; 4) Head-to-head points; 5) Head-to-head goal difference; 6) Head-to-head goals scored; 7) Head-to-head away goals scored.
(C) Champions; (P) Promoted; (R) Relegated

=== Top scorers ===
The Series II top scorers:

18 goals

- (Romania) Ștefan Popa (Rapid București)

17 goals

- (Romania) Nicolae Paraschiv (Rapid București)

16 goals

- (Romania) Florea Voicilă (Unirea Alexandria)

14 goals

- (Romania) Nicolae Toporan (Petrolul Ploiești)

13 goals

- (Romania) Cornel Grigore (Automatica București)

11 goals

- (Romania) Mihai Costea (Dunărea Călărași)

=== Serie III ===
Pos	Team	Pld	W	D	L	GF	GA	GD	Pts	Promotion or relegation
1	Bihor Oradea (C, P)	34	21	6	7	92	49	+43	48	Promotion to Divizia A
2	Baia Mare	34	17	7	10	71	36	+35	41	Qualification to Cup Winners' Cup first round
3	Aurul Brad	34	18	2	14	46	37	+9	38	
4	Olimpia Satu Mare	34	14	7	13	46	40	+6	35	
5	Strungul Arad	34	16	3	15	46	58	−12	35	
6	Înfrățirea Oradea	34	15	4	15	57	50	+7	34	
7	UM Timișoara	34	15	4	15	48	47	+1	34	
8	CIL Sighetu Marmației	34	14	6	14	36	44	−8	34	
9	Someșul Satu Mare	34	15	4	15	40	49	−9	34	
10	FCM Reșița	34	13	7	14	63	43	+20	33	
11	Minerul Cavnic	34	15	3	16	58	51	+7	33	
12	CFR Timișoara	34	13	7	14	48	44	+4	33	
13	Drobeta-Turnu Severin	34	15	3	16	49	54	−5	33	
14	Rapid Arad	34	13	7	14	40	48	−8	33	
15	Dacia Orăștie (R)	34	14	4	16	47	65	−18	32	Relegation to Divizia C
16	Minerul Lupeni (R)	34	13	5	16	47	59	−12	31	Relegation to Divizia C
17	CFR Cluj (R)	34	10	6	18	37	58	−21	26	Relegation to Divizia C
18	Minerul Ilba-Seini (R)	34	9	7	18	29	68	−39	25	Relegation to Divizia C

Source: romaniansoccer.ro (in Romanian)
Rules for classification: 1) Points; 2) Goal difference; 3) Goals scored; 4) Head-to-head points; 5) Head-to-head goal difference; 6) Head-to-head goals scored; 7) Head-to-head away goals scored.
(C) Champions; (P) Promoted; (R) Relegated

=== Top scorers ===
The Series III top scorers:

29 goals

- (Romania) Petre Grosu (Bihor Oradea)

26 goals

- (Romania) Cornel Georgescu (Bihor Oradea)

16 goals

- (Romania) Ferenc Portic (FCM Reșița)

15 goals

- (Romania) Petru Oancea (FCM Reșița)
- (Romania) Alexandru Koller (Baia Mare)

14 goals

- (Romania) M. Marian (Dacia Orăștie)
- (Romania) Ioan Cristea (Minerul Cavnic)
- (Romania) Vasile Nucă ((UM Timișoara)
- (Romania) Adalbert Roznai (Baia Mare)

13 goals

- (Romania) Gheorghe Tulba (Minerul Cavnic)
- (Romania) Dumitru Iordache (Drobeta-Turnu Severin)

11 goals

- (Romania) Marcel Pușcaș (Bihor Oradea)

== See also ==
- 1981–82 Divizia A
- 1981–82 Divizia C
- 1981–82 County Championship
- 1981–82 Cupa României
