= Rudolf Eisenmenger =

Austrian artist

Olympic medal record

Art competitions
Silver medal – second place	1936 Berlin	Paintings

Rudolf Hermann Eisenmenger (7 August 1902 – 3 November 1994) was an Austrian artist.

== Life ==
Professor Eisenmenger belonged to the Danube Swabians of Transylvania. He was born in Piskitelep, until 1918 part of Austria-Hungary, afterwards belonging to Romania. Between 1918 and 1921 he had Romanian citizenship, from 1922 Austrian and after 1938 German.

In 1936 he won a silver medal in the art competitions of the Olympic Games for his "Läufer vor dem Ziel" ("Runners at the Finishing Line").

He is known for the mural, Homecoming of the Ostmark, which shows the proud and glorious return of Austria to the German Empire 1938 after the Anschluss Österreichs in two parts, both seven metres wide. It was exhibited at the Great German Art Exhibition (Große Deutsche Kunstausstellung; GDK) of 1941 in Munich. In a highly controversial decision Eisenmenger was selected to create a large-scale picture for the safety curtain of the Vienna State Opera in 1955.

== Decorations and awards ==
- 1923: Lampi-Preis (Akademie der Bildenden Künste)
- 1925: Kleber-Preis
- 1927: Meisterschulpreis
- 1929: Rompreis für das „Bildnis auf goldenem Grund” und den Tapisserieentwurf „Tageszeiten”
- 1933: Jubiläumspreis der Schützengilde (Wiener Künstlerhaus)
- 1936: Silberne Medaille im olympischen Kunstwettbewerb für das Bild „Läufer vor dem Ziel”
- 1936: Österreichisches Verdienstkreuz für Kunst und Wissenschaft
- 1936: Goldene Ehrenmedaille des Künstlerhauses Wien
- 1936: Preis der Stadt Wien für Malerei
- 1938: Anton-Waldvogel-Stiftungspreis (Wiener Künstlerhaus)
- 1938: Preis der Stadt Wien
- 1941: Künstlerhaus-Jubiläumspreis
- 1942: Albrecht-Dürer-Preis (Nürnberg)
- 1944: Schirach-Preis
- 1956: Silberne Mitgliedsnadel des Wiener Künstlerhauses
- 1957: Austrian Cross of Honour for Science and Art, 1st class
- 1972: Goldener Lorbeer des Wiener Künstlerhauses
- 1973: Grand Silver Medal for Services to the Republic of Austria
