= CS CFR Simeria =

Romanian football club

CFR Simeria
- Full name: Club Sportiv CFR Simeria
- Nicknames: Simerienii (The People from Simeria), CFR-ul (The CFR)
- Founded: 1909; 117 years ago
- Ground: CFR
- Capacity: 200
- Chairman: Vasile Hrițac
- Manager: Adrian Moț
- League: Liga IV
- 2025–26: Liga IV, Hunedoara County, 7th of 11
Home colours	Away colours

Club Sportiv CFR Simeria, commonly known as CFR Simeria, is a Romanian football club based in Simeria, Hunedoara County, that currently competes in Liga IV – Hunedoara County, the fourth tier of Romanian football.

== History ==
CFR Simeria traces its origins back to the early 20th century as a team associated with railway workers. In Simeria's worker colony, cultural and social activities flourished, including choirs, brass bands, and reading clubs. Recognizing the need for physical education, on 28 May 1909, the Piski Vasutas Sport Egylet (PVSE) (lit. 'the Railway Sports Association of Simeria') was officially established.

The club faced difficulties in its early years due to a lack of infrastructure and local skepticism about organized sports. However, support came from railway officials such as engineers Mészko János and Szeitz Sándor. Despite these challenges, PVSE played its first recorded friendly match against Deva AK on 12 August 1909. Simeria fielded the following lineup: Pereny, Palatka, Telicsek, Horváth, Schett, Tóth, Schobel, Bátsker, Rublitzky, Fried, and Kánya.

By the 1910–11 season, PVSE joined the Northern League Championship in Transylvania, competing against established teams such as KVSC. In 1911, PVSE recorded major victories against renowned teams like Arad TC (7–1) and Temesvári Kinizsi Sport (8–2). The people of Simeria embraced football with great enthusiasm, hoping that in the 1911–12 season, the railwaymen would secure a leading position in the Northern League.

In 1913, PVSE won the county football trophy after defeating Hațeg SE 11–0, a competition that also included Deva TK, Dobra SE, and Ilia SE. However, sports activities declined in 1914 due to preparations for World War I.

After the war, in 1919, the club was renamed CFR Simeria (Căile Ferate Române – "Romanian Railways") and joined the Arad District Championship. The team, composed of both experienced and young players, competed in regional competitions. Football activities were centralized, and a new pitch was established in the city center.

== Honours ==
Liga IV – Hunedoara County

- Winners (5): 1969–70, 1983–84, 1984–85, 1999–2000, 2006–07
- Runners-up (2): 1968–69, 2004–05

Hunedoara Regional Championship

- Winners (1): 1957–58
- Runners-up (1): 1955

Cupa României – Hunedoara County

- Winners (2): 1996–97, 2004–05

== League history ==
Season	Tier	Division	Place	Cupa României
2004–05	4	Divizia D (HD)	2nd	
2003–04	3	Divizia C (Seria VII)	11th (R)	
2002–03	3	Divizia C (Seria VI)	11th	
2001–02	3	Divizia C (Seria VI)	12th	
2000–01	3	Divizia C (Seria VI)	11th	
1999–00	4	Divizia D (HD)	1st (C, P)	
1998–99	4	Divizia D (HD)	4th	
1997–98	4	Divizia D (HD)	5th	
1996–97	4	Divizia D (HD)	8th	
1995–96	4	Divizia D (HD)	14th	
1994–95	4	Divizia D (HD)	17th	
1993–94	4	Divizia D (HD)	?	
1992–93	4	County Championship (HD)	7th	
1991–92	3	Divizia C (Seria X)	12th (R)	
1990–91	3	Divizia C (Seria XI)	7th	
1989–90	3	Divizia C (Seria X)	13th	
1988–89	3	Divizia C (Seria IX)	14th	
1987–88	3	Divizia C (Seria X)	14th	
1986–87	3	Divizia C (Seria VIII)	9th	

Season	Tier	Division	Place	Cupa României
1985–86	3	Divizia C (Seria VIII)	10th	
1984–85	4	County Championship (HD)	1st (C, P)	
1983–84	4	County Championship (HD)	1st (C)	
1982–83	3	Divizia C (Seria IX)	15th (R)	
1981–82	3	Divizia C (Seria VIII)	10th	
1980–81	3	Divizia C (Seria XI)	4th	
1979–80	3	Divizia C (Seria VIII)	12th	
1978–79	3	Divizia C (Seria VIII)	12th	
1977–78	3	Divizia C (Seria VIII)	3rd	
1976–77	3	Divizia C (Seria XII)	12th	
1975–76	3	Divizia C (Seria VIII)	13th	
1974–75	3	Divizia C (Seria VIII)	3rd	
1973–74	3	Divizia C (Seria VIII)	5th	
1972–73	3	Divizia C (Seria VIII)	5th	
1971–72	3	Divizia C (Seria IX)	5th	
1970–71	3	Divizia C (Seria VI)	15th	
1969–70	4	County Championship (HD)	1st (C, P)	
1968–69	4	County Championship (HD)	2nd	

== Former managers ==
- (Romania) Victor Roșca (2007)
