= 1981–82 County Championship =

40th season of the Liga IV, the fourth tier of the Romanian football league

Liga IV
- Season: 1981–82

The 1981–82 County Championship was the 40th season of the Liga IV, the fourth tier of the Romanian football league system. The champions of each county association play against one from a neighboring county in a play-off to gain promotion to Divizia C.

== County championships ==
- Alba (AB)
- Arad (AR)
- Argeș (AG)
- Bacău (BC)
- Bihor (BH)
- Bistrița-Năsăud (BN)
- Botoșani (BT)
- Brașov (BV)
- Brăila (BR)
- Bucharest (B)
- Buzău (BZ)
- Caraș-Severin (CS)
- Călărași (CL)
- Cluj (CJ)
- Constanța (CT)
- Covasna (CV)
- Dâmbovița (DB)
- Dolj (DJ)
- Galați (GL)
- Giurgiu (GR)
- Gorj (GJ)
- Harghita (HR)
- Hunedoara (HD)
- Ialomița (IL)
- Iași (IS)
- Ilfov (IF)
- Maramureș (MM)
- Mehedinți (MH)
- Mureș (MS)
- Neamț (NT)
- Olt (OT)
- Prahova (PH)
- Satu Mare (SM)
- Sălaj (SJ)
- Sibiu (SB)
- Suceava (SV)
- Teleorman (TR)
- Timiș (TM)
- Tulcea (TL)
- Vaslui (VS)
- Vâlcea (VL)
- Vrancea (VN)

== Promotion play-off ==
Teams promoted to Divizia C without a play-off matches as teams from less represented counties in the third division.

- (SB) Inter Sibiu
- (SJ) Minerul Sărmășag
- (GJ) Petrolul Țicleni
- (VS) FEPA 74 Bârlad
- (BR) Laminorul Brăila
- (GR) Petrolul Bolintin-Vale
- (CV) Constructorul Sfântu Gheorghe

Preliminary round

Team 1	Agg.	Team 2	1st leg	2nd leg
Metalul Periș (IF)	–	(B) Vâscoza București	–	–

The matches was played on 5 and 12 July 1981.

Team 1	Agg.	Team 2	1st leg	2nd leg
Proletarul Bacău (BC)	3–3 (Note: DVA Portul Galați won on the away goals rule.)	(GL) DVA Portul Galați	3–1	0–2
Sticla Bistrița (BN)	2–2 (3–2 p)	(MM) IS Sighetu Marmației	2–0	0–2
Progresul Băilești (DJ)	4–4 (0–3 p)	(OT) IPC Slatina	3–1	1–3
Electrica Titu (DB)	4–3	(TR) Constructorul TCIF Buzescu	3–1	1–2
Auto Timișoara (TM)	3–5	(AR) Frontiera Curtici	2–3	1–2
Vâscoza București (B)	4–3	(PH) Victoria Florești	3–0	1–3
Progresul Topoloveni (AG)	5–2	(VL) Cauciucul Dragașani	2–1	3–1
Automecanica Reșița (CS)	4–5	(MH) Armătura Strehaia	4–0	0–5
Unio Satu Mare (SM)	0–2	(BH) Minerul Bihor	0–0	0–2
Soda Ocna Mureș (AB)	3–1	(HD) Constructorul Hunedoara	3–0	0–1
Olimpia Gherla (CJ)	4–3	(MS) Electromureș Târgu Mureș	3–1	1–2
Victoria Munteni-Buzău (IL)	1–2	(CL) ISCIP Ulmeni	1–1	0–1
Șoimii Topolog (TL)	2–2 (2–4 p)	(CT) Dobrogea Canal Basarabi	2–0	0–2
Sănătatea Darabani (BT)	0–16	(SV) Zimbrul Suceava	0–5	0–11
Textila Prejmer (BV)	3–3 (Note: Textila Prejmer won on the away goals rule.)	(HR) Flamura Roșie Sânsimion	2–0	1–3
Constructorul Voința Odobești (VN)	1–3	(BZ) Metalul Buzău	1–2	0–1
Tehnoton Iași (IS)	2–6	(NT) AZO-TCM Săvinești	1–1	1–5

== Championships standings ==
=== Arad County ===
Series A

Pos	Team	Pld	W	D	L	GF	GA	GD	Pts	Qualification or relegation
1	Gloria Arad (Q)	30	23	2	5	81	27	+54	48	Qualification to championship final
2	Motorul Arad	30	16	7	7	79	26	+53	39	
3	Victoria Nădlac	30	17	5	8	59	35	+24	39	
4	Semlecana Semlac	30	17	4	9	50	27	+23	38	
5	Unirea Șeitin	30	16	6	8	47	32	+15	38	
6	Victoria Zăbrani	30	15	7	8	62	45	+17	37	
7	Fulgerul Arad	30	13	8	9	57	43	+14	34	
8	AProgresul Pecica	30	11	9	10	50	41	+9	31	
9	Mureșul Zădăreni	30	11	6	13	63	49	+14	28	
10	Înfrățirea Iratoșu	30	13	1	16	61	55	+6	27	
11	Libertatea Arad	30	9	8	13	32	54	−22	26	
12	CPL Arad	30	7	11	12	33	35	−2	25	
13	Victoria Felnac	30	7	7	16	42	81	−39	21	
14	Viitorul Turnu	30	7	5	18	26	91	−65	19	
15	Banatul Vinga	30	5	7	18	32	77	−45	17	
16	Unirea Aluniș	30	4	5	21	28	84	−56	13	

Rules for classification: 1) Points; 2) Goal difference; 3) Number of goals scored.
(Q) Qualified for the phase indicated

Series B

Pos	Team	Pld	W	D	L	GF	GA	GD	Pts	Qualification or relegation
1	Frontiera Curtici (Q)	30	20	7	3	69	23	+46	47	Qualification to championship final
2	Crișana Sebiș	30	19	3	8	93	29	+64	41	
3	Stăruința Dorobanți	30	18	3	9	61	38	+23	39	
4	Gloria Ineu	30	16	5	9	76	30	+46	37	
5	Șiriana Șiria	30	15	7	8	70	45	+25	37	
6	Strungul Chișineu-Criș	30	14	6	10	76	42	+34	34	
7	Unirea Șofronea	30	15	4	11	82	48	+34	34	
8	Metalul Ineu	30	15	2	13	66	58	+8	32	
9	Șoimii Pâncota	30	12	4	14	35	39	−4	28	
10	Voința Macea	30	10	6	14	49	62	−13	26	
11	Crișul Buteni	30	11	4	15	55	76	−21	26	
12	Olimpia Bocsig	30	9	7	14	49	61	−12	25	
13	Dacia Beliu	30	9	5	16	41	105	−64	23	
14	Unirea Sântana	30	9	4	17	42	86	−44	22	
15	CFR Gurahonț	30	9	3	18	31	82	−51	21	
16	Victoria Seleuș	30	4	0	26	29	100	−71	8	

Rules for classification: 1) Points; 2) Goal difference; 3) Number of goals scored.
(Q) Qualified for the phase indicated

Championship final

The matches was played on 4 and 8 June 1980.

Team 1	Agg.	Team 2	1st leg	2nd leg
Gloria Arad	–	Frontiera Curtici	–	–

Frontiera Curtici won the 1981–82 Arad County Championship and qualify for promotion play-off in Divizia C.

=== Botoșani County ===
Pos	Team	Pld	W	D	L	GF	GA	GD	Pts	Qualification or relegation
1	Sănătatea Darabani (C, Q)	32	22	5	5	107	33	+74	49	Qualification to promotion play-off
2	Înainte Copălău	32	22	3	7	86	47	+39	47	
3	Luceafărul Botoșani	32	19	3	10	82	66	+16	41	
4	Munca Drăgușeni	32	18	2	12	82	66	+16	38	
5	Intex Botoșani	32	17	4	11	79	66	+13	38	
6	Mașini Unelte Dorohoi	32	16	3	13	67	56	+11	35	
7	Sportivul Trușești	32	14	2	16	83	78	+5	30	
8	Flacăra Flămânzi	32	13	3	16	68	54	+14	29	
9	Avântul Albești	32	11	7	14	57	61	−4	29	
10	Unirea Săveni	32	12	5	15	68	77	−9	29	
11	Avântul Mihai Eminescu	32	13	2	17	69	73	−4	28	
12	Rapid Ungureni	32	13	2	17	54	71	−17	28	
13	Viitorul Dersca	32	13	2	17	56	75	−19	28	
14	Zorile Roma	32	11	3	18	65	88	−23	25	
15	Zorile Havârna	32	11	3	18	45	96	−51	25	
16	Spicul Avrămeni	32	7	6	19	48	89	−41	20	
17	Sportivul Ripiceni	32	8	3	21	38	92	−54	19	

Rules for classification: 1) Points; 2) Goal difference; 3) Number of goals scored.
(C) Champions; (Q) Qualified for the phase indicated

=== Covasna County ===
Pos	Team	Pld	W	D	L	GF	GA	GD	Pts	Qualification or relegation
1	Constructorul Sfântu Gheorghe (C, Q)	34	26	3	5	79	25	+54	55	Qualification to promotion play-off
2	Electro Sfântu Gheorghe	34	23	5	6	123	43	+80	49 (Note: Electro Sfântu Gheorghe, Stăruința Bodoc, Progresul Chichiș, Progresul Catalina and Victoria Fotoș deducted 2 points.)	
3	Avântul Ilieni	34	19	2	13	65	44	+21	40	
4	IAS Câmpu Frumos	34	17	5	12	91	59	+32	39	
5	Carpați Covasna	34	16	5	13	56	39	+17	37	
6	Apemin Biborțeni	34	16	4	14	65	76	−11	36	
7	Venus Ozun	34	15	5	14	66	57	+9	35	
8	Ciucașul Întorsura Buzăului	34	14	6	14	55	50	+5	34	
9	Perkő Sânzieni	34	14	6	14	49	51	−2	34	
10	Stăruința Bodoc	34	13	8	13	54	55	−1	32	
11	Stăruința Cernat	34	12	8	14	60	65	−5	32	
12	Stăruința Zagon	34	14	3	17	63	75	−12	31	
13	Recolta Vârghiș	34	13	4	17	54	108	−54	30	
14	Progresul Chichiș	34	14	3	17	37	43	−6	29	
15	Unirea Reci	34	12	4	18	53	69	−16	28	
16	Recolta Tamașfalău	34	9	10	15	49	73	−24	28	
17	Progresul Catalina	34	10	4	20	59	85	−26	22	
18	Victoria Fotoș	34	5	3	26	33	97	−64	11	

Rules for classification: 1) Points; 2) Goal difference; 3) Number of goals scored.
(C) Champions; (Q) Qualified for the phase indicated

=== Harghita County ===
Pos	Team	Pld	W	D	L	GF	GA	GD	Pts	Qualification or relegation
1	Flamura Roșie Sânsimion (C, Q)	21	13	6	2	43	16	+27	32	Qualification to promotion play-off
2	Unirea Hodoșa	21	14	2	5	53	24	+29	30	
3	Metalul Vlăhița	22	12	5	5	62	22	+40	29	
4	Mobila Ditrău	22	12	5	5	46	19	+27	29	
5	Harghita Miercurea Ciuc	22	13	3	6	49	27	+22	29	
6	Spicul Ulieș	22	9	2	11	43	47	−4	20	
7	Rapid Porumbenii Mari	22	9	2	11	42	54	−12	20	
8	Complexul Gălăuțaș	22	7	4	11	33	47	−14	18	
9	Viață Nouă Remetea	22	7	2	13	35	72	−37	16	
10	Șoimii Băile Tușnad	22	6	3	13	36	53	−17	15	
11	Făgetul Borsec (Note: Făgetul Borsec withdrew after 16 rounds and lost all remaining matches with 0–3.) (R)	22	6	1	15	19	48	−29	13	Relegation to Harghita County Championship II
12	ITA Cârța (R)	22	4	3	15	23	55	−32	11	Relegation to Harghita County Championship II

Rules for classification: 1) Points; 2) Goal difference; 3) Number of goals scored.
(C) Champions; (Q) Qualified for the phase indicated; (R) Relegated

=== Hunedoara County ===
Pos	Team	Pld	W	D	L	GF	GA	GD	Pts	Qualification or relegation
1	Constructorul Hunedoara (C, Q)	22	16	1	5	48	22	+26	33	Qualification to promotion play-off
2	Avântul Hațeg	22	14	2	6	53	25	+28	30	
3	Minerul Deva	22	14	1	7	45	36	+9	29	
4	Minerul Uricani	22	13	1	8	58	33	+25	27	
5	IMC Bârcea	22	12	2	8	40	20	+20	26	
6	Metalul Crișcior	22	12	1	9	39	39	0	25	
7	Parângul Lonea	22	10	3	9	35	23	+12	23	
8	Mecanica Orăștie	22	8	5	9	27	34	−7	21	
9	Preparatorul Petrila	22	10	0	12	40	42	−2	20	
10	Minerul Teliuc	22	6	4	12	26	48	−22	16	
11	CFR Petroșani	22	4	3	15	19	44	−25	11	
12	Metalul Simeria	22	1	1	20	10	74	−64	3	

Rules for classification: 1) Points; 2) Goal difference; 3) Number of goals scored.
(C) Champions; (Q) Qualified for the phase indicated

=== Maramureș County ===
Pos	Team	Pld	W	D	L	GF	GA	GD	Pts	Qualification or relegation
1	IS Sighetu Marmației (C, Q)	26	19	3	4	78	22	+56	41	Qualification to promotion play-off
2	Electrica Baia Mare	26	16	3	7	62	30	+32	35	
3	Stăruința Recea	26	16	1	9	76	46	+30	33	
4	Metalul Bogdan Vodă	26	16	1	9	52	47	+5	33	
5	Tractorul Satulung	26	14	3	9	65	39	+26	31	
6	Recolta Rozavlea	26	14	3	9	56	41	+15	31	
7	Maramureșana Sighetu Marmației	26	12	3	11	44	28	+16	27	
8	IPP Coștiui	26	12	3	11	53	75	−22	27	
9	Iza Dragomirești	26	11	4	11	38	49	−11	26	
10	Voința Târgu Lăpuș	26	10	2	14	46	48	−2	22	
11	Forestiera Câmpulung la Tisa	26	9	4	13	37	43	−6	22	
12	Recolta Cernești	26	10	1	15	50	71	−21	21	
13	Voința Poienile de sub Munte (R)	26	6	2	18	39	81	−42	14	Relegation to Maramureș County Championship II
14	Minerul Valea Chioarului (Note: Minerul Valea Chioarului withdrew at the end of the first part of the season and lost all remaining matches with 0–3.) (R)	26	0	1	25	10	86	−76	1	Relegation to Maramureș County Championship II

Rules for classification: 1) Points; 2) Goal difference; 3) Number of goals scored.
(C) Champions; (Q) Qualified for the phase indicated; (R) Relegated

=== Mureș County ===
Pos	Team	Pld	W	D	L	GF	GA	GD	Pts	Qualification or relegation
1	Electromureș Târgu Mureș (C, Q)	32	20	9	3	75	16	+59	49	Qualification to promotion play-off
2	IRA Târgu Mureș	32	18	10	4	54	22	+32	46	
3	Autobuzul Târnăveni	32	19	6	7	74	27	+47	44	
4	Viitorul Târgu Mureș	32	16	8	8	66	36	+30	40	
5	Metalul Reghin	32	15	6	11	49	30	+19	36	
6	Constructorul Târgu Mureș	32	11	9	12	31	27	+4	31	
7	Sticla Târnăveni	32	10	11	11	39	38	+1	31	
8	Lacul Ursu Sovata	32	10	11	11	32	32	0	31	
9	Voința Miercurea Nirajului	32	11	8	13	33	39	−6	30	
10	Faianța Sighișoara	32	12	5	15	37	45	−8	29	
11	Voința Sărmașu	32	12	4	16	41	55	−14	28	
12	Transportul Târgu Mureș	32	9	9	14	34	54	−20	27	
13	Unirea Ungheni	32	10	7	15	32	72	−40	27	
14	Energia Iernut	32	9	7	16	37	57	−20	25	
15	Voința Sângeorgiu de Pădure	32	8	9	15	27	55	−28	25	
16	Recolta Vidrasău	32	9	5	18	40	60	−20	23	
17	Gaz Metan Daneș	32	6	10	16	34	70	−36	22	

Rules for classification: 1) Points; 2) Goal difference; 3) Number of goals scored.
(C) Champions; (Q) Qualified for the phase indicated

=== Prahova County ===
Pos	Team	Pld	W	D	L	GF	GA	GD	Pts	Qualification or relegation
1	Victoria Florești (C, Q)	34	22	8	4	78	19	+59	52	Qualification to promotion play-off
2	Chimistul Valea Călugărească	34	20	8	6	74	27	+47	48	
3	Petrolistul Boldești	34	21	6	7	52	27	+25	48	
4	Sportul Muncitoresc Câmpina	34	19	7	8	61	23	+38	45	
5	Avântul Măneciu	34	19	7	8	57	27	+30	45	
6	Metalul Filipeștii de Pădure	34	16	4	14	65	45	+20	36	
7	Unirea Teleajen Ploiești	34	15	5	14	49	40	+9	35	
8	IUC Ploiești	34	16	3	15	49	52	−3	35	
9	Tricolorul Breaza	34	14	6	14	56	54	+2	34	
10	Metalul Vălenii de Munte	34	13	6	15	45	45	0	32	
11	Feroemail Ploiești	34	12	7	15	44	51	−7	31	
12	Neptun Câmpina	34	11	6	17	41	71	−30	28	
13	Geamul Scăieni	34	10	6	18	44	61	−17	26	
14	Voința Vărbilău	34	10	6	18	36	66	−30	22 (Note: Voința Vărbilău deducted 4 points.)	
15	Electrica Câmpina	34	9	3	22	37	88	−51	21	
16	Petrolul PECO Ploiești	34	6	8	20	32	60	−28	20	
17	OJT Bucegi Sinaia (R)	34	6	2	26	28	92	−64	14	Relegation to Prahova County Championship II
18	ASA Mizil (Note: ASA Mizil merged at the end of the first part of the season with Divizia C side ICIM Ploiești and continued to play in the third level.) (D)	17	10	2	5	26	16	+10	22	Withdrew

Rules for classification: 1) Points; 2) Goal difference; 3) Number of goals scored.
(C) Champions; (D) Disqualified; (Q) Qualified for the phase indicated; (R) Relegated

=== Sălaj County ===
Pos	Team	Pld	W	D	L	GF	GA	GD	Pts	Qualification or relegation
1	Minerul Sărmășag (C, Q)	26	19	4	3	84	19	+65	42	Qualification to promotion play-off
2	Recolta Agrij	26	13	3	10	70	56	+14	29	
3	Energia Sânmihaiu Almașului	26	10	9	7	45	35	+10	29	
4	Voința Derșida	26	12	5	9	44	41	+3	29	
5	Someșul Someș-Odorhei	26	11	6	9	41	34	+7	28	
6	Chimia Zalău	26	9	8	9	51	35	+16	26	
7	Progresul Bălan	26	10	6	10	55	66	−11	26	
8	Minerul Surduc	26	11	3	12	52	54	−2	25	
9	Avântul Lompirt	26	11	3	12	39	52	−13	25	
10	Spartac Crasna	29	9	6	14	51	55	−4	24	
11	Calmin Băbeni	26	7	7	12	49	64	−15	21	
12	Minerul Letca	26	9	3	14	44	62	−18	21	
13	Izolatorul Șimleu Silvaniei	26	8	4	14	40	69	−29	20	
14	Olimpic Bocșa	26	8	3	15	50	73	−23	19	

Rules for classification: 1) Points; 2) Goal difference; 3) Number of goals scored.
(C) Champions; (Q) Qualified for the phase indicated

=== Sibiu County ===
Pos	Team	Pld	W	D	L	GF	GA	GD	Pts	Qualification or relegation
1	Inter Sibiu (C, Q)	34	29	4	1	133	10	+123	62	Qualification to promotion play-off
2	Unirea Ocna Sibiului	34	27	5	2	93	12	+81	59	
3	CSU-TCI Sibiu	34	24	6	4	92	31	+61	54	
4	Metalul IO Sibiu	34	22	6	6	58	28	+30	50	
5	Construcții Sibiu	34	20	6	8	68	34	+34	46	
6	Mecanica Sibiu	34	17	8	9	57	43	+14	42	
7	Sparta Mediaș	34	15	5	14	57	41	+16	35	
8	Metalul Copșa Mică	34	14	7	13	61	45	+16	35	
9	Firul Roșu Tălmaciu	34	14	3	17	51	52	−1	31	
10	Record Mediaș	34	14	3	17	36	47	−11	31	
11	Progresul Dumbrăveni	34	14	2	18	63	62	+1	30	
12	CFR Sibiu	34	12	5	17	56	72	−16	29	
13	Carbosin Copșa Mică	34	10	8	16	41	56	−15	28	
14	Textila Mediaș	34	11	5	18	36	76	−40	27	
15	ITA Mediaș (R)	34	8	6	20	31	81	−50	22	Relegation to Sibiu County Championship II
16	Păltiniș Rășinari (R)	34	8	4	22	38	107	−69	20	Relegation to Sibiu County Championship II
17	Spicul Șeica (Note: Spicul Șeica and Viitorul Nocrich were expelled in the second part of the season and lost all remaining matches with 0–3.) (R)	34	3	1	30	14	99	−85	7	Relegation to Sibiu County Championship II
18	Viitorul Nocrich (R)	34	0	2	32	6	101	−95	2	Relegation to Sibiu County Championship II

Rules for classification: 1) Points; 2) Goal difference; 3) Number of goals scored.
(C) Champions; (Q) Qualified for the phase indicated; (R) Relegated

=== Suceava County ===
Series I

Pos	Team	Pld	W	D	L	GF	GA	GD	Pts	Qualification or relegation
1	Zimbrul Suceava (Q)	26	18	7	1	80	23	+57	43	Qualification to championship final
2	Fuiorul Cornu Luncii	26	17	2	7	60	41	+19	36	
3	Bradul Vama	26	13	5	8	49	36	+13	31	
4	Avântul Todirești	26	14	1	11	63	57	+6	29	
5	Minerul Fundu Moldovei	26	14	0	12	49	43	+6	28	
6	Bistrița Broșteni	26	12	3	11	47	53	−6	27	
7	Viitorul Câmpulung Moldovenesc	26	11	3	12	64	48	+16	25	
8	Minerul Crucea	26	10	5	11	43	53	−10	25	
9	Minerul Iacobeni	26	10	4	12	58	65	−7	24	
10	Sportul Muncitoresc Pojorâta	26	10	4	12	55	54	+1	24	
11	Foresta Moldovița	26	11	1	14	46	49	−3	23	
12	Recolta Bosanci	26	11	1	14	53	62	−9	23	
13	Victoria Păltinoasa	26	8	3	15	38	63	−25	19	
14	Rapid Suceava	26	3	1	22	20	78	−58	7	

Rules for classification: 1) Points; 2) Goal difference; 3) Number of goals scored.
(Q) Qualified for the phase indicated

Series II

Pos	Team	Pld	W	D	L	GF	GA	GD	Pts	Qualification or relegation
1	Unirea Siret (Q)	26	19	3	4	82	15	+67	41	Qualification to championship final
2	Avântul Gălănești	26	14	8	4	77	32	+45	36	
3	Șoimii Calafindești	26	14	4	8	56	42	+14	32	
4	Viitorul Verești	26	13	4	9	54	41	+13	30	
5	Recolta Fântânele	26	12	3	11	62	54	+8	27	
6	Avântul Grămești	24	11	3	10	54	46	+8	25	
7	Constructorul Dărmănești	26	12	3	11	55	55	0	27	
8	Avântul Bădeuți	26	12	2	12	49	46	+3	26	
9	Recolta Zvoriștea	26	11	1	14	50	71	−21	23	
10	Siretul Dolhasca	26	10	2	14	54	51	+3	22	
11	Locomotiva Dornești	26	10	2	14	39	64	−25	22	
12	Viitorul Arbore	26	9	1	16	36	83	−47	19	
13	Moldova Drăgușeni	26	8	2	16	41	81	−40	18	
14	Recolta Volovăț	26	7	0	19	39	67	−28	14	

Rules for classification: 1) Points; 2) Goal difference; 3) Number of goals scored.
(Q) Qualified for the phase indicated

Championship final

The matches were played on 10 and 14 June 1982.

Team 1	Agg.	Team 2	1st leg	2nd leg
Zimbrul Suceava	4–2	Unirea Siret	4–1	0–1

Zimbrul Suceava won the Suceava County Championship and qualified to the promotion play-off for Divizia C.

== See also ==
- 1981–82 Divizia A
- 1981–82 Divizia B
- 1981–82 Divizia C
- 1981–82 Cupa României
