= 1983–84 Divizia B =

Divizia B
- Season: 1983–84
- Promoted: Gloria Buzău; FCM Brașov; Politehnica Timișoara
- Relegated: Delta Tulcea; Nitramonia Făgăraș; CFR Caransebeș; Borzești; ROVA Roșiori; Steaua CFR Cluj; Unirea Slobozia; Constructorul Craiova; Someșul Satu Mare; Dunărea Călărași; Chimia Turnu Măgurele; Rapid Arad

The 1983–84 Divizia B was the 44th season of the second tier of the Romanian football league system.

The format has been maintained to three series, each of them having 18 teams. At the end of the season the winners of the series promoted to Divizia A and the last four places from each series relegated to Divizia C.

== Team changes ==
=== To Divizia B ===
Promoted from Divizia C

- Chimia Fălticeni
- Partizanul Bacău
- Olimpia Râmnicu Sărat
- Unirea Slobozia
- Metalul Plopeni
- Chimia Turnu Măgurele
- Constructorul Craiova
- CFR Caransebeș
- Minerul Lupeni
- Steaua CFR Cluj
- Avântul Reghin
- Nitramonia Făgăraș

Relegated from Divizia A

- FCM Brașov
- Politehnica Timișoara
- FC Constanța

=== From Divizia B ===
Relegated to Divizia C

- Minerul Gura Humorului
- Pandurii Târgu Jiu
- CIL Sighetu Marmației
- IMU Medgidia
- MF Steaua București
- UM Timișoara
- Viitorul Mecanica Vaslui
- Drobeta-Turnu Severin
- Strungul Arad
- Viitorul Gheorgheni
- Precizia Săcele
- Înfrățirea Oradea

Promoted to Divizia A

- Dunărea CSU Galați
- Rapid București
- Baia Mare

=== Renamed teams ===
CSM Sfântu Gheorghe was renamed as IMASA Sfântu Gheorghe.

== League tables ==
=== Serie I ===
Pos	Team	Pld	W	D	L	GF	GA	GD	Pts	Promotion or relegation
1	Gloria Buzău (C, P)	34	20	7	7	67	31	+36	47	Promotion to Divizia A
2	Gloria Bistrița	34	18	3	13	50	27	+23	39	
3	Partizanul Bacău	34	17	4	13	43	44	−1	38	
4	Ceahlăul Piatra Neamț	34	15	6	13	41	32	+9	36	
5	FC Constanța	34	13	11	10	55	31	+24	35 (Note: FC Constanța were deducted 2 points.)	
6	CSM Suceava	34	13	9	12	36	35	+1	35	
7	Chimia Fălticeni	34	15	5	14	38	52	−14	35	
8	Oțelul Galați	34	13	8	13	45	38	+7	34	
9	CS Botoșani	34	16	2	16	45	42	+3	34	
10	Progresul Brăila	34	14	6	14	41	38	+3	34	
11	Unirea Dinamo Focșani	34	14	5	15	51	45	+6	33	
12	Olimpia Râmnicu Sărat	34	13	7	14	39	37	+2	33	
13	Metalul Plopeni	34	12	8	14	32	34	−2	32	
14	Prahova Ploiești	34	13	6	15	34	41	−7	32	
15	Delta Tulcea (R)	34	12	8	14	30	58	−28	32	Relegation to Divizia C
16	CSM Borzești (R)	34	11	5	18	39	67	−28	27	Relegation to Divizia C
17	Unirea Slobozia (R)	34	12	8	14	35	43	−8	26 (Note: Unirea Slobozia were deducted 6 points.)	Relegation to Divizia C
18	Dunărea Călărași (R)	34	8	6	20	28	54	−26	22	Relegation to Divizia C

Source: romaniansoccer.ro (in Romanian)
Rules for classification: 1) Points; 2) Goal difference; 3) Goals scored; 4) Head-to-head points; 5) Head-to-head goal difference; 6) Head-to-head goals scored; 7) Head-to-head away goals scored.
(C) Champions; (P) Promoted; (R) Relegated

=== Serie II ===
Pos	Team	Pld	W	D	L	GF	GA	GD	Pts	Promotion or relegation
1	FCM Brașov (C, P)	34	21	7	6	71	27	+44	49	Promotion to Divizia A
2	Șoimii IPA Sibiu	34	17	5	12	55	38	+17	39	
3	Dinamo Victoria București	34	14	9	11	42	32	+10	37	
4	Carpați Mârșa	34	14	9	11	52	53	−1	37	
5	Gaz Metan Mediaș	34	16	3	15	54	44	+10	35	
6	Autobuzul București	34	13	9	12	29	32	−3	35	
7	Avântul Reghin	34	15	5	14	44	53	−9	35	
8	IP Aluminiu Slatina	34	12	10	12	42	33	+9	34	
9	Chimica Târnăveni	34	15	4	15	52	44	+8	34	
10	Progresul Vulcan București	34	11	12	11	46	43	+3	34	
11	Unirea Alexandria	34	14	6	14	39	47	−8	34	
12	IMASA Sfântu Gheorghe	34	13	7	14	41	36	+5	33	
13	Automatica București	34	14	5	15	32	40	−8	33	
14	Metalul București	34	14	5	15	38	49	−11	33	
15	Nitramonia Făgăraș (R)	34	13	5	16	52	46	+6	31	Relegation to Divizia C
16	ROVA Roșiori (R)	34	12	4	18	32	61	−29	28	Relegation to Divizia C
17	Constructorul Craiova (R)	34	11	5	18	44	63	−19	27	Relegation to Divizia C
18	Chimia Turnu Măgurele (R)	34	10	4	20	35	59	−24	24	Relegation to Divizia C

Source: romaniansoccer.ro (in Romanian)
Rules for classification: 1) Points; 2) Goal difference; 3) Goals scored; 4) Head-to-head points; 5) Head-to-head goal difference; 6) Head-to-head goals scored; 7) Head-to-head away goals scored.
(C) Champions; (P) Promoted; (R) Relegated

=== Serie III ===
Pos	Team	Pld	W	D	L	GF	GA	GD	Pts	Promotion or relegation
1	Politehnica Timișoara (C, P)	34	25	4	5	93	22	+71	54	Promotion to Divizia A
2	Universitatea Cluj	34	25	1	8	78	25	+53	51	
3	CSM Reșița	34	20	2	12	59	30	+29	42	
4	Armătura Zalău	34	17	3	14	51	45	+6	37	
5	UTA Arad	34	15	5	14	50	49	+1	35	
6	Olimpia Satu Mare	34	16	2	16	55	44	+11	34	
7	Aurul Brad	34	15	4	15	41	44	−3	34	
8	Minerul Lupeni	34	14	5	15	43	47	−4	33	
9	Industria Sârmei Câmpia Turzii	34	15	3	16	38	41	−3	33	
10	Minerul Cavnic	34	15	2	17	53	46	+7	32	
11	Minerul Motru	34	14	4	16	36	50	−14	32	
12	CFR Timișoara	34	14	3	17	55	61	−6	31	
13	Gloria Reșița	34	14	3	17	34	45	−11	31	
14	Metalurgistul Cugir	34	13	5	16	40	61	−21	31	
15	CFR Caransebeș (R)	34	13	3	18	28	67	−39	29	Relegation to Divizia C
16	Steaua CFR Cluj (R)	34	13	2	19	44	52	−8	26 (Note: Steaua CFR Cluj were deducted 2 points.)	Relegation to Divizia C
17	Someșul Satu Mare (R)	34	10	4	20	26	54	−28	24	Relegation to Divizia C
18	Rapid Arad (R)	34	8	5	21	28	69	−41	21	Relegation to Divizia C

Source: romaniansoccer.ro (in Romanian)
Rules for classification: 1) Points; 2) Goal difference; 3) Goals scored; 4) Head-to-head points; 5) Head-to-head goal difference; 6) Head-to-head goals scored; 7) Head-to-head away goals scored.
(C) Champions; (P) Promoted; (R) Relegated

== See also ==
- 1983–84 Divizia A
- 1983–84 Divizia C
- 1983–84 County Championship
- 1983–84 Cupa României
