= 1982–83 Divizia B =

Divizia B
- Season: 1982–83
- Promoted: Dunărea CSU Galați; Rapid București; Baia Mare
- Relegated: Minerul Gura Humorului; Pandurii Târgu Jiu; CIL Sighetu Marmației; IMU Medgidia; MF Steaua București; UM Timișoara; Viitorul Mecanica Vaslui; Drobeta-Turnu Severin; Strungul Arad; Viitorul Gheorgheni; Precizia Săcele; Înfrățirea Oradea

The 1982–83 Divizia B was the 43rd season of the second tier of the Romanian football league system.

The format has been maintained to three series, each of them having 18 teams. At the end of the season the winners of the series promoted to Divizia A and the last four places from each series relegated to Divizia C.

== Team changes ==
=== To Divizia B ===
Promoted from Divizia C

- Minerul Gura Humorului
- Borzești
- Prahova Ploiești
- Metalosport Galați
- Dinamo Victoria București
- Rova Roșiori
- Minerul Motru
- Metalurgistul Cugir
- Gloria Reșița
- Armătura Zalău
- IS Câmpia Turzii
- Precizia Săcele

Relegated from Divizia A

- Universitatea Cluj
- UTA Arad
- Progresul Vulcan București

=== From Divizia B ===
Relegated to Divizia C

- CSU Galați
- Flacăra-Automecanica Moreni
- Dacia Orăștie
- Constructorul Iași
- Metalul Plopeni
- Minerul Lupeni
- Victoria Tecuci
- Tractorul Brașov
- CFR Cluj
- Relonul Săvinești
- ICIM Brașov
- Minerul Ilba-Seini

Promoted to Divizia A

- Politehnica Iași
- Petrolul Ploiești
- Bihor Oradea

=== Renamed teams ===
Energia Slatina was renamed as IP Aluminiu Slatina.

FCM Reșița was renamed as CSM Reșița.

Mecanică Fină București was renamed as Mecanică Fină Steaua București.

Viitorul Vaslui was renamed as Viitorul Mecanica Vaslui.

=== Other teams ===
FCM Galați and CSU Galați merged, the second one being absorbed by the first one. After the merge FCM Galați was renamed as Dunărea CSU Galați.

== League tables ==
=== Serie I ===
Pos	Team	Pld	W	D	L	GF	GA	GD	Pts	Promotion or relegation
1	Dunărea CSU Galați (C, P)	34	21	6	7	72	30	+42	48	Promotion to Divizia A
2	Gloria Buzău	34	19	4	11	62	38	+24	42	
3	Oțelul Galați	34	16	6	12	61	38	+23	38	
4	CSM Suceava	34	16	6	12	38	36	+2	38	
5	Gloria Bistrița	34	17	1	16	55	38	+17	35	
6	Progresul Brăila	34	17	1	16	62	54	+8	35	
7	Ceahlăul Piatra Neamț	34	16	3	15	49	43	+6	35	
8	CS Botoșani	34	16	3	15	44	40	+4	35	
9	Prahova Ploiești	34	14	6	14	46	42	+4	34	
10	Unirea Dinamo Focșani	34	15	4	15	39	47	−8	34	
11	Borzești	34	14	5	15	38	43	−5	33	
12	Sfântu Gheorghe	34	13	6	15	38	41	−3	32	
13	Dunărea Călărași	34	14	4	16	43	53	−10	32	
14	Delta Tulcea	34	14	3	17	35	58	−23	31	
15	Minerul Gura Humorului (Note: Minerul Gura Humorului were deducted 2 points.) (R)	34	15	2	17	45	63	−18	30	Relegation to Divizia C
16	IMU Medgidia (R)	34	11	5	18	42	57	−15	27	Relegation to Divizia C
17	Viitorul Mecanica Vaslui (R)	34	10	6	18	32	53	−21	26	Relegation to Divizia C
18	Viitorul Gheorgheni (R)	34	10	5	19	33	60	−27	25	Relegation to Divizia C

Source: romaniansoccer.ro (in Romanian)
Rules for classification: 1) Points; 2) Goal difference; 3) Goals scored; 4) Head-to-head points; 5) Head-to-head goal difference; 6) Head-to-head goals scored; 7) Head-to-head away goals scored.
(C) Champions; (P) Promoted; (R) Relegated

=== Serie II ===
Pos	Team	Pld	W	D	L	GF	GA	GD	Pts	Promotion or relegation
1	Rapid București (C, P)	34	26	4	4	68	23	+45	56	Promotion to Divizia A
2	Dinamo Victoria București	34	18	6	10	54	36	+18	42	
3	IP Aluminiu Slatina	34	17	7	10	50	37	+13	41	
4	Minerul Motru	34	16	3	15	56	59	−3	35	
5	Carpați Mârșa	34	14	6	14	52	43	+9	34	
6	Unirea Alexandria	34	15	4	15	46	41	+5	34	
7	ROVA Roșiori	34	15	4	15	34	41	−7	34	
8	Gaz Metan Mediaș	34	14	6	14	34	42	−8	34	
9	Metalul București	34	15	3	16	51	41	+10	33	
10	Progresul Vulcan București (Note: Progresul Vulcan București were deducted 4 points.)	34	15	7	12	48	42	+6	33	
11	Autobuzul București	34	13	7	14	40	36	+4	33	
12	Chimica Târnăveni	34	15	3	16	38	42	−4	33	
13	Șoimii IPA Sibiu	34	13	7	14	44	48	−4	33	
14	Automatica București	34	14	5	15	34	42	−8	33	
15	Pandurii Târgu Jiu (R)	34	13	4	17	46	46	0	30	Relegation to Divizia C
16	MF Steaua București (R)	34	10	8	16	42	49	−7	28	Relegation to Divizia C
17	Drobeta-Turnu Severin (R)	34	8	7	19	27	49	−22	23	Relegation to Divizia C
18	Precizia Săcele (R)	34	8	3	23	30	77	−47	19	Relegation to Divizia C

Source: romaniansoccer.ro (in Romanian)
Rules for classification: 1) Points; 2) Goal difference; 3) Goals scored; 4) Head-to-head points; 5) Head-to-head goal difference; 6) Head-to-head goals scored; 7) Head-to-head away goals scored.
(C) Champions; (P) Promoted; (R) Relegated

=== Serie III ===
Pos	Team	Pld	W	D	L	GF	GA	GD	Pts	Promotion or relegation
1	Baia Mare (C, P)	34	21	5	8	83	29	+54	47	Promotion to Divizia A
2	UTA Arad	34	18	7	9	65	26	+39	43	
3	Universitatea Cluj	34	19	3	12	61	26	+35	41	
4	IS Câmpia Turzii	34	17	3	14	53	41	+12	37	
5	Armătura Zalău	34	18	1	15	41	62	−21	37	
6	Minerul Cavnic	34	17	2	15	68	48	+20	36	
7	CSM Reșița	34	15	6	13	49	41	+8	36	
8	Olimpia Satu Mare	34	15	5	14	60	53	+7	35	
9	Rapid Arad	34	15	4	15	54	54	0	34	
10	Gloria Reșița	34	15	4	15	43	66	−23	34	
11	Aurul Brad	34	14	5	15	45	46	−1	33	
12	Someșul Satu Mare	34	15	3	16	53	63	−10	33	
13	Metalurgistul Cugir	34	14	5	15	44	60	−16	33	
14	CFR Timișoara	34	13	5	16	51	52	−1	31	
15	CIL Sighetu Marmației (R)	34	14	3	17	53	56	−3	31	Relegation to Divizia C
16	UM Timișoara (R)	34	11	5	18	41	65	−24	27	Relegation to Divizia C
17	Strungul Arad (R)	34	10	4	20	30	63	−33	24	Relegation to Divizia C
18	Înfrățirea Oradea (R)	34	8	4	22	27	70	−43	20	Relegation to Divizia C

Source: romaniansoccer.ro (in Romanian)
Rules for classification: 1) Points; 2) Goal difference; 3) Goals scored; 4) Head-to-head points; 5) Head-to-head goal difference; 6) Head-to-head goals scored; 7) Head-to-head away goals scored.
(C) Champions; (P) Promoted; (R) Relegated

== See also ==
- 1982–83 Divizia A
- 1982–83 Divizia C
- 1982–83 County Championship
- 1982–83 Cupa României
