= Simeria =

- Town
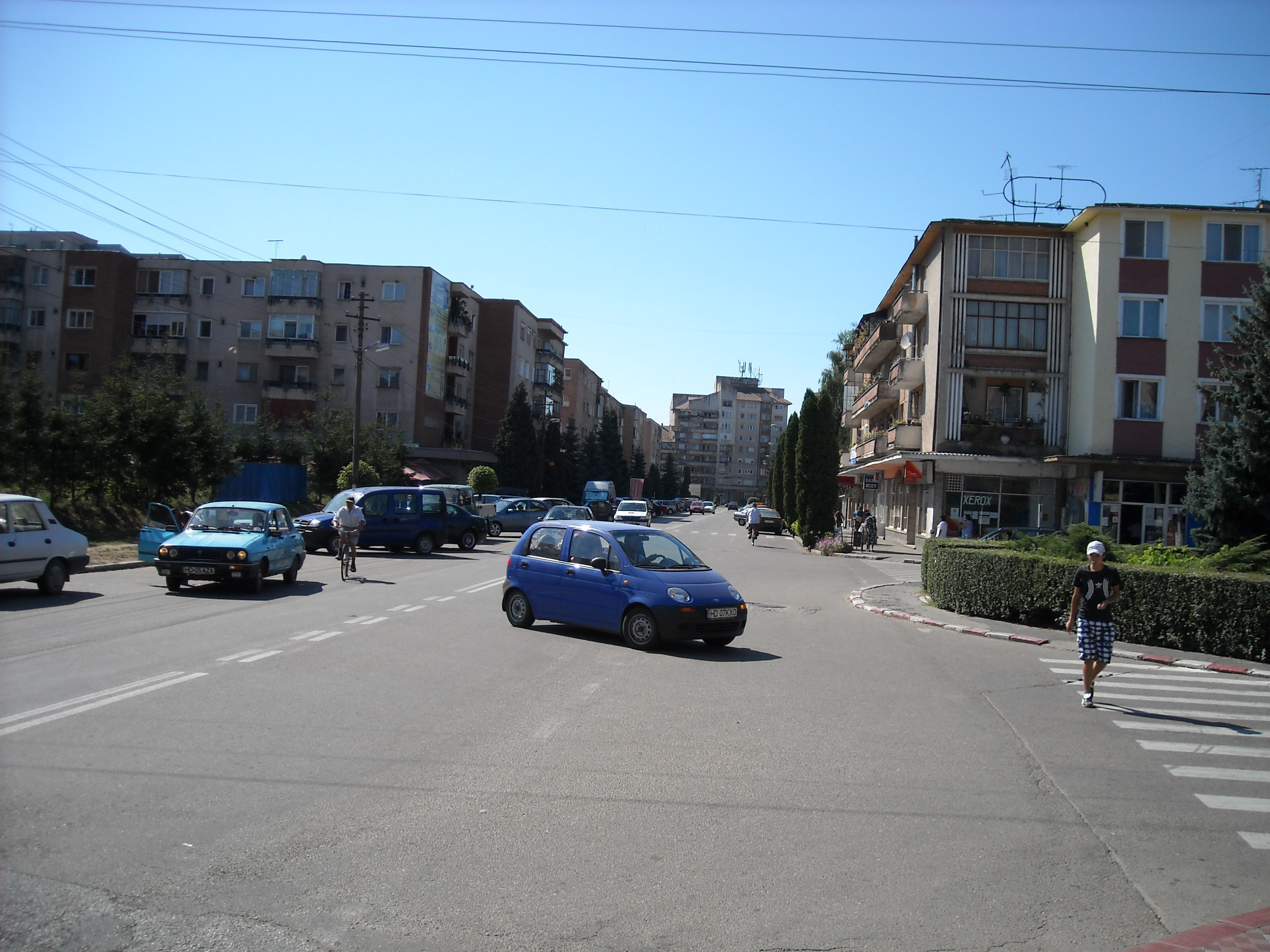
- Downtown Simeria

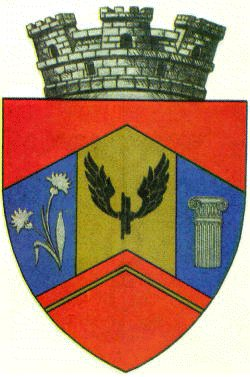
- Coat of arms

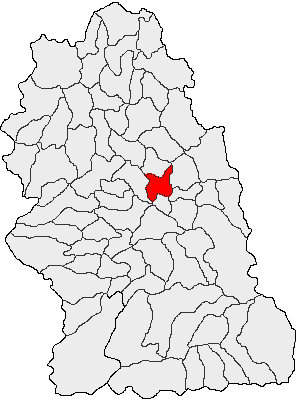
- Location in Hunedoara County

- Location in Romania
- Coordinates: 45°51′0″N 23°0′36″E
- Country: Romania
- County: Hunedoara

Government
  - Mayor (2024–2028): Emil-Ioan Rîsteiu (PNL)
- Area: 49.75 km^{2} (19.21 sq mi)
- Elevation: 200 m (660 ft)
- Population (2021-12-01): 11,268
  - Density: 226.5/km^{2} (586.6/sq mi)
- Time zone: UTC+02:00 (EET)
  - Summer (DST): UTC+03:00 (EEST)
- Postal code: 335900
- Area code: (+40) 02 54
- Vehicle reg.: HD
- Website: primariasimeria.ro

Simeria (Romanian pronunciation: [siˈmeri.a]; German: Fischdorf; Hungarian: Piski) is a town in Hunedoara County, Transylvania, Romania, and an important railway junction with a hump yard. Six villages are administered by the town: Bârcea Mare (Nagybarcsa), Cărpiniș (Gyertyános), Simeria Veche (Ópiski), Sântandrei (Szentandrás), Șăulești (Sárfalva), and Uroi (Arany).

The town lies on the banks of the Mureș River, near where the Strei River discharges into it. It is located in the central part of Hunedoara County, between the Apuseni Mountains to the north and the Retezat Mountains to the south. The county seat, Deva, is 8.5 km (5.3 mi) to the northwest.

Simeria is crossed by the A1 motorway (part of European route E68) and by national road DN7 (part of E79). The Simeria train station serve the CFR Main Line 200, which links Bucharest with the Banat region, in western Romania; it also serves Line 202, which links runs south to Filiași, Dolj County, and Line 207, which runs southwest to Hunedoara.

The local football club, CS CFR Simeria, competes in Liga IV Hunedoara; its home ground is Stadionul CFR.

== Natives ==
- Ilona Dajbukát (1892–1976), Hungarian actress
- Rudolf Eisenmenger (1902–1994), Austrian artist
- Ferenc Feketehalmy-Czeydner (1890–1946), Hungarian military officer
- Sigismund Toduță (1908–1991), Romanian composer, musicologist, and academic

Historical population
Year	Pop.	±%
1850	2,419	—
1910	7,607	+214.5%
1956	7,706	+1.3%
1966	9,365	+21.5%
1977	13,206	+41.0%
1992	14,311	+8.4%
2002	14,571	+1.8%
2011	12,556	−13.8%
2021	11,268	−10.3%
Source: Census data
