= Stadionul CFR (Simeria) =

Stadium in Romania

- Interactive map of Stadionul CFR
- Address: Str. Victoriei
- Location: Simeria, Romania
- Coordinates: 45°50′43.6″N 23°00′39.5″E
- Owner: Town of Simeria
- Operator: CFR Simeria
- Capacity: 200 seated
- Surface: Grass

Construction
- Opened: 19 November 1933

Tenants
- CFR Simeria (1933–present); Deva (2020–2021)

Stadionul CFR is a multi-purpose stadium in Simeria, Romania. It is currently used mostly for football matches, is the home ground of CFR Simeria and has a capacity of 200 seats.
