= CSM Borzești =

Romanian association football club

- Full name: Clubul Sportiv Muncitoresc Borzești
- Short name: Borzești
- Founded: 1975; 50 years ago
- Dissolved: 1994; 31 years ago
- Ground: CSM Borzești / Stadion Energia
- Capacity: 10,000 / 3,000

Clubul Sportiv Muncitoresc Borzești, commonly known as CSM Borzești was a Romania football club from Onești, Bacău County. In 1994 the club merged with Electromecon Onești to form FC Onești.

== History ==
CSM Borzești was founded 1975 after the merger of Știința Bacău with CAROM Onești, the first one being absorbed by the second one. After the merge, CAROM was moved to Borzești, a village (now part of Onești) and renamed as CSM Borzești.

== Honours ==
Divizia C

- Winners (3): 1979–80, 1981–82, 1989–90
- Runners-up (2): 1977–78, 1986–87

Liga IV – Bacău County

- Winners (1): 1993–94

=== Other performances ===
- Appearances in Divizia B: 7
- Appearances in Divizia C: 11
- Best finish in Divizia B: 9th 1975–76

== League history ==
Season	Tier	Division	Place	Notes	Cupa României
1992–93	3	Divizia C (Seria I)	19th	Relegated	
1991–92	2	Divizia B (Seria III)	18th	Relegated	
1990–91	2	Divizia B (Seria I)	14th		
1989-90	3	Divizia C (Seria II)	1st (C)	Promoted	Round of 32
1988–89	3	Divizia C (Seria II)	10th		
1987–88	3	Divizia C (Seria II)	6th		
1986–87	3	Divizia C (Seria II)	2nd		
1985–86	3	Divizia C (Seria II)	4th		
1984–85	3	Divizia C (Seria II)	3rd		

Season	Tier	Division	Place	Notes	Cupa României
1983–84	2	Divizia B (Seria I)	16th	Relegated	
1982–83	2	Divizia B (Seria I)	11th		
1981–82	3	Divizia C (Seria II)	1st (C)	Promoted	
1980–81	2	Divizia B (Seria I)	15th	Relegated	
1979-80	3	Divizia C (Seria II)	1st (C)	Promoted	
1978–79	3	Divizia C (Seria II)	6th		
1977–78	3	Divizia C (Seria II)	2nd		
1976–77	2	Divizia B (Seria I)	16th	Relegated	
1975–76	2	Divizia B (Seria I)	9th		

== Former managers ==
- (Romania) Teofil Codreanu (1983–1984)
- (Romania) Toader Șteț
- (Romania) Ioan Sdrobiș
