= List of minor Romanian football clubs =

This is a list of Romanian association football clubs which lack the prominence for their Wikipedia pages.

== Constructorul Arad ==
Constructorul Arad
- Full name: Asociația Sportivă Constructorul Arad
- Founded: 1946

Constructorul Arad was a Romanian football club from Arad, Arad County. The club founded in 1946.

Honours

Liga IV – Arad County

- Winners (1): 1971–72

Arad Regional Championship

- Winners (2): 1951, 1955

== Dinamo Bacău ==
Dinamo Bacău
- Full name: Fotbal Club Dinamo Bacău
- Founded: 2017
- Dissolved: 2023

Dinamo Bacău was founded in 2017 by physical education teachers Remus Pozânărea, Bogdan Ghica, and Mihai Voicu.

The team played its first season in Liga IV Bacău County, finishing 6th, followed by a 7th-place finish in the 2018–19 season. The 2019–20 season was suspended in March 2020 due to the COVID-19 pandemic. At the time, Dinamo was leading Series I of Liga IV Bacău County and played the championship final against Viitorul Curița, losing 2–3 on aggregate (1–0 and 1–3).

Dinamo bounced back by winning the 2020–21 Liga IV Bacău short tournament. Promotion to Liga III was secured after defeating Viitorul Cluj 2–2 (4–3 on penalties) in the preliminary round and benefiting from the withdrawal of the third-division side Bradu Borca from the promotion/relegation play-off.

In the 2021–22 season, Dinamo competed in Liga III Series II, finishing 8th in both the regular season and the play-out round. The 8th-place finish was repeated in the 2022–23 season.

In 2023, Dinamo Bacău merged with Academia FC Bacău to form FC Bacău, ceding its Liga III place to the newly formed club.

Honours

Liga IV – Bacău County

- Winners (1): 2020–21
- Runners-up (1): 2019–20

== Europa Alba Iulia ==
Europa Alba Iulia
- Full name: Club Sportiv Europa Alba Iulia
- Founded: 2009
- Ground: Cetate
- Capacity: 18,000

Europa Alba Iulia was founded in 2009.

Honours

Liga IV – Alba County

- Winners (1): 2011–12
- Runners-up (1): 2010–11

Liga V – Alba County

- Winners (1): 2009–10

== Inter Petrila ==
Inter Petrila
- Full name: Club Sportiv Inter Petrila
- Founded: 1921
- Ground: Parângul Lonea

The club was founded in 1921.

Honours

Liga IV – Hunedoara County

- Winners (4): 1990–91, 1992–93, 1998–99, 2016–17
- Runners-up (5): 1970–71, 1971–72, 2015–16, 2017–18, 2018–19

== Inter Voluntari ==
Inter Voluntari
- Full name: Asociația Sportivă Inter Voluntari
- Founded: 1987
- Dissolved: 2012
- Ground: Gheorghe Dincă
- Capacity: 1,500

Inter Voluntari was founded in 1987 and competed in the Ilfov County championships before entering Divizia C in 2001, taking the place of Metalul Filipeștii de Pădure and competing under the name CS Voluntari. The team finished 14th in Series II in the 2001–02 season but withdrew from the competition at the beginning of the second half of the campaign.

After leaving the national league system, the club competed in Liga IV Bucharest as Inter Voluntari until it disappeared in 2012.

== Minerul Rodna ==
Minerul Rodna
- Full name: Club Sportiv Minerul Rodna
- Founded: 1960
- Ground: Gabana

Minerul Rodna is a Romanian football club from Rodna, Bistrița-Năsăud County, that currently competes in Liga IV – Bistrița-Năsăud County, the fourth tier of Romanian football.

Honours

Liga III

- Runners-up (2): 1976–77, 1980–81

Liga IV – Bistrița-Năsăud County

- Winners (9): 1970–71, 1972–73, 1988–89, 1990–91, 1994–95, 2001–02, 2004–05, 2018–19, 2022–23
- Runners-up (1): 2021–22

== Quantum Club Galați ==
Quantum Club Galați
- Full name: Club Sportiv Quantum Club Galați
- Founded: 2011
- Dissolved: 2022

Quantum Club Galați was founded in 2011 and consistently ranked among the top teams in Liga IV – Galați County. After earning promotion to the fourth division by winning Series I of Liga V – Galați County, the team achieved its best performance in the 2014–15 season, finishing in 3rd place, while also securing 4th place in the 2012–13 and 2021–22 seasons. Unfortunately, due to financial difficulties, the club was dissolved in 2022.

Honours

Liga V – Galați County

- Winners (1): 2011–12

== Retezatul Hațeg ==
Retezatul Hațeg
- Full name: Club Sportiv Orășenesc Retezatul Hațeg
- Founded: 1946
- Ground: Orășenesc
- Capacity: 1,000
- Manager: Daniel Dăscălescu
- League: Liga IV Hunedoara

Retezatul Hațeg is a Romanian football club from Hațeg, Hunedoara County, that currently competes in Liga IV – Hunedoara County, the fourth tier of Romanian football. The club was founded in 1946 and over time has had several names such as Victoria, Unirea and Abatorul (the 60s), Gloria and Autotransport (the 70s), Avântul (1977–1987), Haber Hațeg (1991–1992), and from 1996 returned to Retezatul.

Honours

Liga IV – Hunedoara County

- Winners (5): 1987–88, 2008–09, 2013–14, 2018–19, 2021–22
- Runners-up (3): 1981–82, 2012–13, 2020–21

== Victoria Florești ==
Victoria Florești
- Full name: Club Sportiv Victoria Florești
- Founded: 1939

Victoria Florești was founded in 1939 in Florești, Prahova County as a representative of the local tire factory, Banloc Goodrich. The first name carried by the football team was Banloc Florești, and the club's colors were black and white.

Honours

Liga IV – Prahova County

- Winners (5): 1969–70, 1978–79, 1981–82, 1983–84, 1984–85

== Victoria Zăbrani ==
Victoria Zăbrani
- Full name: Club Sportiv Victoria Zăbrani
- Founded: 1932
- Ground: Iosif Scheirich
- Capacity: 1,500

Victoria Zăbrani is a Romanian football club from Zăbrani, Arad County, that currently competes in Liga IV – Arad County, the fourth tier of Romanian football. The club was founded in 1932 when a group of craftsmen from the local community decided to form a football team to participate in the sporting competitions of the time. Under the guidance of veterinarian Dr. Adam Mussar, the team was named "Guttenbrunner Sportverein.

Over time, the team underwent several name changes. In 1948, the team competed under the name "Viforul." By 1949–1950, under the management of the State Agricultural Enterprise (Gostat), the team played as "Recolta" and later as "G.A.S. (Gospodăria Agricolă de Stat—lit. 'State Agricultural Farm')" in the Banat Regional Championship. Following the reorganization of Gostat in the 1960s, the current name was adopted: Victoria Zăbrani. The club's colors are white and red.

Honours

Liga IV – Arad County

- Winners (1): 2019–20

== Viitorul Domnești ==
Viitorul Domnești
- Full name: Club Sportiv Viitorul Domnești
- Founded: 2010
- Ground: Voința

Viitorul Domnești is a Romanian football club from Domnești, Ilfov County, that currently competes only at youth level. The club was founded in 2010, after the former Liga III side Viscofil Popești-Leordeni was moved from Popești-Leordeni to Domnești.

Honours

Liga III

- Runners-up (2): 2011–12, 2016–17

Liga IV – Ilfov County

- Winners (1): 2019–20, 2020–21

== Viitorul Șoimuș ==
Viitorul Șoimuș
- Full name: Asociația Club Sportiv Viitorul Șoimuș
- Founded: 2017
- Ground: Chișcădaga

Viitorul Șoimuș was founded in April 2017 and currently competes at the youth level in the Hunedoara County Football Association (AJF Hunedoara) competitions

The senior team last played in the 2022–23 season of the Liga IV – Hunedoara County, finishing in last place.

== Viitorul Ungheni ==
Viitorul Ungheni
- Full name: Club Sportiv Viitorul Ungheni
- Founded: 2004
- Ground: Central

History

Viitorul Ungheni was founded in 2004 at the initiative of Professor Cristian Duran, playing their matches on the field in Gheorghe Doja commune, near Ungheni. In the 2014–15 season, the team won Liga IV – Mureș County and participated in the promotion play-off for Liga III, losing to Înfrățirea Hărman with an aggregate score of 4–8 (0–2 in Hărman and 4–6 in Ungheni).

Honours

Liga IV – Mureș County

- Winners (1): 2014–15
