= Stadionul Unirea (Jucu) =

Sports venue in Romania

- Interactive map of Stadionul Unirea
- Address: Str. Principală
- Location: Jucu de Mijloc, Romania
- Coordinates: 46°50′21.2″N 23°46′16.6″E
- Owner: Commune of Jucu
- Operator: Speranța Jucu; Minerul Ocna Dej
- Capacity: 800 seated
- Surface: Grass

Construction
- Opened: 1970s
- Renovated: 2010s

Tenants
- Speranța Jucu (1974–present); Minerul Ocna Dej (2022-present); Sănătatea Cluj (2020–2021)

Stadionul Unirea is a multi-purpose stadium in the Jucu de Mijloc village, Jucu commune, Romania. It is currently used mostly for football matches, is the home ground of Speranța Jucu and Minerul Ocna Dej and has a seated capacity of 800 seats.
