= Călin Harfaș =

Romanian footballer

Personal information
- Date of birth: 29 January 2003 (age 23)
- Place of birth: Mediaș, Romania
- Position: Defensive midfielder

Team information
- Current team: Minerul Ocna Dej

Youth career
- –2016: Viitorul Cluj
- 2016–2022: Gaz Metan Mediaș

Senior career*
| Years | Team | Apps | (Gls) |
| 2022 | Gaz Metan Mediaș | 13 | (0) |
| 2022 | Ceahlăul Piatra Neamț | 8 | (0) |
| 2023 | Unirea Constanța | 2 | (0) |
| 2023 | Unirea Alba Iulia | 0 | (0) |
| 2024– | Minerul Ocna Dej | 0 | (0) |
- * Club domestic league appearances and goals as of 16:22, 24 January 2024 (UTC)

Călin Harfaș (born 29 January 2003) is a Romanian professional footballer who plays as a defensive midfielder for Minerul Ocna Dej.
