= Florin Achim =

Romanian professional football player

Personal information
- Full name: Florin Vasile Achim
- Date of birth: 16 July 1991 (age 35)
- Place of birth: Baia Mare, Romania
- Height: 1.80 m (5 ft 11 in)
- Position: Right back

Team information
- Current team: Minaur Baia Mare (team manager)

Youth career
- –2009: FC Baia Mare

Senior career*
Years	Team	Apps	(Gls)
2009–2010	FC Baia Mare	24	(1)
2010–2013	FCMU Baia Mare	61	(3)
2012	→ Astra II Giurgiu (loan)	13	(0)
2013–2014	Săgeata Năvodari	26	(1)
2014–2015	Universitatea Cluj	4	(0)
2015–2016	Hapoel Petah Tikva	32	(2)
2016	Bregalnica Štip	12	(0)
2017	Hapoel Nir Ramat HaSharon	14	(1)
2017	Olimpia Satu Mare	12	(0)
2018–2021	Academica Clinceni	124	(4)
2022–2023	FCSB	1	(0)
2023–2024	Concordia Chiajna	9	(0)
Total		332	(12)

Managerial career
- 2024–: Minaur Baia Mare (Team Manager)
- * Club domestic league appearances and goals

Florin Vasile Achim (born 16 July 1991) is a former Romanian professional football player who played as a right back, currently team manager at Liga III club Minaur Baia Mare.

== Career ==
Achim started playing football in his hometown as a youngster for FC Baia Mare. In 2010 FC Baia Mare has dissolved and he joined the newborn FC Maramureș Baia Mare. During 2012 Achim was loaned to the second team of Astra Giurgiu. He returned to FC Maramureș and played for his team until it was dissolved, in 2013. In June 2013 Achim signed a contract with the first league team Săgeata Năvodari, after being spotted at a trial by their manager, Tibor Selymes. Săgeata Năvodari relegated in 2014 and Achim moved back in Transilvania at Universitatea Cluj.

== Career statistics ==
=== Club ===
Appearances and goals by club, season and competition
Club	Season	League			National Cup		League Cup		Continental		Other		Total	
Club	Season	Division	Apps	Goals	Apps	Goals	Apps	Goals	Apps	Goals	Apps	Goals	Apps	Goals
FC Baia Mare	2009–10	Liga II	24	1	0	0	–		–		–		24	1
FCMU Baia Mare	2010–11	Liga III	23	1	0	0	–		–		–		23	1
FCMU Baia Mare	2011–12	Liga II	15	1	0	0	–		–		–		15	1
FCMU Baia Mare	2012–13	Liga II	23	1	0	0	–		–		–		23	1
FCMU Baia Mare	Total		61	3	0	0	–	–	–	–	–	–	61	3
Astra II Giurgiu (loan)	2011–12	Liga II	13	0	–		–		–		–		13	0
Săgeata Năvodari	2013–14	Liga I	26	1	1	0	–		–		–		27	1
Universitatea Cluj	2014–15	Liga I	4	0	1	0	–		–		–		5	0
Hapoel Petah Tikva	2015–16	Liga Leumit	32	2	–		–		–		–		32	2
Bregalnica Štip	2016–17	Macedonian First Football League	12	0	1	0	–		–		–		13	0
Hapoel Nir Ramat HaSharon	2016–17	Liga Leumit	14	1	0	0	–		–		–		14	1
Olimpia Satu Mare	2017–18	Liga II	12	0	1	0	–		–		–		13	0
Academica Clinceni	2017–18	Liga II	14	1	–		–		–		–		14	1
Academica Clinceni	2018–19	Liga II	31	1	1	0	–		–		–		32	1
Academica Clinceni	2019–20	Liga I	33	2	3	0	–		–		–		36	2
Academica Clinceni	2020–21	Liga I	31	0	1	0	–		–		–		32	0
Academica Clinceni	2021–22	Liga I	15	0	1	0	–		–		–		16	0
Academica Clinceni	Total		124	4	6	0	–	–	–	–	–	–	130	4
FCSB	2021–22	Liga I	1	0	–		–		–		–		1	0
Concordia Chiajna	2023–24	Liga II	9	0	1	0	–		–		–		10	0
Career total			332	12	11	0	–	–	–	–	–	–	343	12

== Honours ==
FC Maramureș Baia Mare

- Liga III : 2010–11

Universitatea Cluj

- Cupa României runner-up: 2014–15
