= Gheorghe Barbu (footballer) =

Romanian footballer (1968–2021)

Personal information
- Date of birth: 20 July 1968
- Place of birth: Moreni, Romania
- Date of death: 31 October 2021 (aged 53)
- Place of death: Dej, Romania
- Positions: Forward; midfielder

Senior career*
Years	Team	Apps	(Gls)
1988–1989	Universitatea Craiova	5	(0)
1990–1991	Electroputere Craiova	31	(13)
1991–1992	Universitatea Craiova	30	(1)
1993–1997	Farul Constanța	140	(22)
1997	Ceahlăul Piatra Neamț	11	(0)
1998–1999	Național București	38	(3)
1999–2000	Farul Constanța	13	(2)
2000–2001	Universitatea Cluj	14	(2)
Total		282	(43)

Managerial career
- 2006–2010: Mureșul Deva
- 2011–2012: Universitatea II Cluj
- 2012: FCM Reșița
- 2013: Universitatea Cluj (assistant)
- 2013: Universitatea Cluj (caretaker)
- 2015–2016: Unirea Jucu
- 2016: Unirea Dej
- 2017: Unirea Dej
- 2017–2018: CFR II Cluj
- 2018: Dacia Unirea Brăila
- 2018–2019: Unirea Dej
- 2019–2020: Someșul Dej
- 2021: Victoria Cluj
- * Club domestic league appearances and goals

Gheorghe Barbu (20 July 1968 – 31 October 2021) was a Romanian footballer who played as a forward and midfielder. After he ended his playing career he worked as a manager, mainly at teams from the Romanian lower leagues, with a short spell in the first league at Universitatea Cluj.

== Playing career ==
Barbu was born on 20 July 1968 in Moreni, Romania. He began playing senior-level football at Universitatea Craiova, making his Divizia A debut on 5 March 1989 under coach Sorin Cârțu in a 2–0 away loss to Victoria București. Subsequently, he joined Divizia B side Electroputere Craiova, scoring 13 goals in the 1990–91 season to help them gain first league promotion. Then he made a comeback to "U" Craiova and played in both legs of the 3–2 aggregate loss to Apollon Limassol in the 1991–92 European Cup first round. Barbu also played in a 1–0 loss to Sigma Olomouc in the 1992–93 UEFA Cup first round. In the middle of the 1992–93 season, Barbu went to play for Farul Constanța, but Universitatea still managed to win the Cupa României. There, he made five appearances in the 1995 Intertoto Cup, scoring once in a win over Dnepr Mogilev, as the club reached the round of 16 where they were defeated by Heerenveen. In the 1995–96 season, Barbu netted a personal record of eight goals in the first league. He moved to Ceahlăul Piatra Neamț in 1997. However, he spent only half a year there, going to Național București. Barbu played six matches in the 1998 Intertoto Cup campaign, as they got past Hapoel Haifa and Iraklis, being eliminated by Bologna. In 1999, he made a comeback to Farul Constanța, making his last Divizia A appearance on 10 May 2000 in a 2–1 away loss to FC Onești, totaling 237 matches with 28 goals in the competition. During the 2000–01 Divizia C season, Barbu played for Universitatea Cluj under coach Ioan Sabău, helping them gain promotion to the second league and retiring afterwards.

== Managerial career ==
Barbu began coaching in 2006 at Mureșul Deva where he spent four years, helping the team gain promotion to the second league in 2007. Subsequently, between 2011 and 2012, he worked for Universitatea II Cluj and FCM Reșița. In 2013 he worked as Ionel Ganea's assistant for first league team Universitatea Cluj, while also serving as a caretaker coach for a short time after Ganea's departure. From 2015 to 2021, Barbu coached several teams in the Romanian lower leagues such as Unirea Jucu, Unirea Dej, CFR II Cluj, Dacia Unirea Brăila, Someșul Dej and Victoria Cluj.

== Death ==
Barbu died at age 53 while sleeping in Dej on 31 October 2021. At the time of his death, he was employed as a sporting manager at Liga III team Someșul Dej.

== Honours ==
=== Player ===
Electroputere Craiova

- Divizia B: 1990–91

Universitatea Craiova

- Cupa României: 1992–93

Universitatea Cluj

- Divizia C: 2000–01

=== Manager ===
- Liga IV – Cluj County: 2019–20
