= Kennedy Ndi Bahgob =

Cameroonian footballer

Personal information
- Full name: Kennedy Ndi Bahgob
- Date of birth: 4 June 1998 (age 28)
- Place of birth: Yaoundé, Cameroon
- Height: 1.84 m (6 ft 0 in)
- Position: Forward

Team information
- Current team: União Desportiva Sampedrense
- Number: 7

Youth career
- 2014: Panthere Bangante
- 2015: Cosmos Du Mbam
- 2016: Cosmos Du Mbam
- 2017: AS Matelo

Senior career*
| Years | Team | Apps | (Gls) |
| 2017 | Petrocub Hîncești | 5 | (0) |
| 2017-2020 | Unirea Dej | 32 | (9) |
| 2021-2022 | SFI F.C. | 15 | (5) |
| 2022-2023 | Atlético Clube Avelarense | 14 | (2) |
| 2023 | União Desportiva Sampedrense | 8 | (0) |
- * Club domestic league appearances and goals

Kennedy Ndi Bahgob (born 4 June 1998) is a Cameroonian footballer who plays as a forward for União Desportiva Sampedrense.

== Career ==
Bahgob signed for Moldovan National Division club Petrocub Hîncești on April 4, 2017. He made his league debut for the club on 30 April 2017 in a 1–0 loss against FC Dacia Chișinău. He left the club after making five appearances in total. On 1 July 2017, Kennedy joined Romanian club Unirea Dej.

In 2021, he joined Taiwan Second Division club SFI F.C. In the winter transfer window of 2022, he joined Portuguese club Atlético Clube Avelarense, with just a season in Portugal he moved the following season to join União Desportiva Sampedrense.
