= Alin Bota =

Romanian football goalkeeper

Personal information
- Full name: Alin Vasile Bota
- Date of birth: 29 May 1983 (age 43)
- Place of birth: Baia Mare, Romania
- Height: 1.93 m (6 ft 4 in)
- Position: Goalkeeper

Team information
- Current team: Minaur Baia Mare
- Number: 12

Youth career
- FC Baia Mare

Senior career*
Years	Team	Apps	(Gls)
2003–2006	FC Baia Mare	16	(2)
2007–2009	CFR Cluj	0	(0)
2007	→ Unirea Dej (loan)	7	(1)
2007–2008	→ Otopeni (loan)	3	(0)
2008	→ FC Baia Mare (loan)	0	(0)
2008–2010	FC Baia Mare	57	(8)
2010–2011	FCMU Baia Mare	10	(3)
2012–2013	Gloria Bistrița	11	(0)
2013–2016	FCM Baia Mare	50	(?)
2016–2021	Comuna Recea	103	(21)
2021–2022	Minaur Baia Mare	0	(0)

Managerial career
- 2021–: Minaur Baia Mare (GK Coach)
- * Club domestic league appearances and goals as of 08:41, 21 June 2022 (UTC)

Alin Vasile Bota (born 29 May 1983) is a Romanian football goalkeeper who plays for Liga III side Minaur Baia Mare. In his career he also played for teams such as: CFR Cluj, CS Otopeni, FC Baia Mare or Gloria Bistrița and is well known for scoring from penalties.

== Honours ==
Baia Mare

- Liga III : 2005–06, 2008–09, 2014–15, 2021–22

ACSF Comuna Recea

- Liga III : 2019–20
