= Daniel Rednic =

Romanian footballer

Personal information
- Full name: Daniel Eugen Rednic
- Date of birth: 9 February 1978 (age 48)
- Place of birth: Ieud, Romania
- Height: 1.74 m (5 ft 9 in)
- Position: Left midfielder

Youth career
- Maramureș Baia Mare

Senior career*
Years	Team	Apps	(Gls)
1994–1996	Maramureș Baia Mare	45	(5)
1997	Oțelul Galați	11	(6)
1997–1998	Dinamo București	35	(7)
1998–1999	Argeș Pitești	28	(3)
2000	Rocar București	9	(0)
2000–2002	Universitatea Craiova	35	(6)
2002–2004	MTK Hungária	52	(6)
2005–2006	Politehnica Iași	36	(6)
2006–2007	Argeș Pitești	16	(2)
2008–2010	Baia Mare	28	(1)
Total		295	(42)
- * Club domestic league appearances and goals

Daniel Eugen Rednic (born 2 February 1978) is a Romanian retired football player who played as a left midfielder.

== Playing career ==
Rednic was born on 2 February 1978 in Ieud, Romania and began playing junior-level football at Maramureș Baia Mare. He started to play for the team's senior squad by making his Divizia A debut on 20 August 1994 under coach Lucian Bălan in a 1–1 draw against Sportul Studențesc București. The team suffered relegation at the end of his first season, but Rednic stayed with the club for another one and a half years. Subsequently, he returned to Divizia A football by joining Oțelul Galați. On 2 August 1997, the front page of the first edition of the ProSport newspaper announced that Rednic and Daniel Florea were transferred from Oțelul to Dinamo București. There, Rednic played in both legs of the 4–1 aggregate loss to Knattspyrnufélag Reykjavíkur in the first qualifying round of the 1997–98 UEFA Cup. In 1998, he went to play for Argeș Pitești, moving one year later to Rocar București.

In 2000, Rednic joined Universitatea Craiova for a two-season spell, during which he played in a 2–2 draw against 1. FC Slovácko in the second round of the 2001 Intertoto Cup. Afterwards, he moved to Hungarian side MTK Hungária. His Nemzeti Bajnokság I debut took place on 26 July 2002, when coach Sándor Egervári sent him in the 59th minute to replace Péter Czvitkovics in a 3–1 victory against Videoton FC Fehérvár. He scored his first goal in the competition on 14 September in a 1–0 win over Siófok. Rednic made 26 appearances and scored four goals in the 2002–03 season, as MTK Hungária won the championship. He then helped the club win the 2003 Szuperkupa by playing as a starter under Egervári before being substituted by Czvitkovics at halftime of the 2–0 victory against Ferencváros. Afterwards, Rednic played three matches in the 2003–04 Champions League qualifying rounds, scoring once as the team got past HJK in the second round before they were defeated by Celtic in the following round. He made his last Nemzeti Bajnokság I appearance on 27 November 2004 in a 3–1 away loss to Vasas, totaling 52 matches with six goals in the competition.

In 2005, Rednic returned to Romania by joining Politehnica Iași. After one and a half years, he went for a second spell at Argeș Pitești but could not help the club avoid relegation to the second league. He made his last Liga I appearance on 5 May 2007 in a 5–1 away loss to Oțelul, accumulating a total of 174 matches and 30 goals in the competition. Rednic ended his career in 2010, after spending two seasons at Baia Mare, helping the team gain promotion from the third league to the second in the first season.

== Coaching career ==
After he ended his playing career in 2010, Rednic moved to the United States, settling in Concord, California, where he coached at a youth football club.

== Honours ==
MTK Hungária

- Nemzeti Bajnokság I: 2002–03
- Szuperkupa: 2003

Baia Mare

- Liga III: 2008–09
