= Caravan capitalism =

Economic concept

Caravan capitalism is the act of travelling between countries as wages increase. It takes its name from an alternative name for the travel trailer, and was coined by German minister of finance Peer Steinbrück in March 2007 after Nokia signed a memorandum with Cluj County Council, Romania to open a new plant near the city in Jucu commune closing the Bochum, Germany factory, to local criticism.
