= CS Minaur Baia Mare (football) =

Romanian football club from Baia Mare

Minaur Baia Mare
- Full name: Clubul Sportiv Minaur Baia Mare
- Short name: Minaur
- Founded: 1948
- Ground: Viorel Mateianu
- Capacity: 8,000
- Owner: Baia Mare Municipality
- Chairman: Ioachim Nicolae Făt
- Manager: Paul Pîrvulescu
- League: Liga III (Seria VIII)
- 2025–26: Liga III, 6th (play-off Seria IV)
- Website: https://csminaur.ro/fotbal/

Clubul Sportiv Minaur Baia Mare, commonly known as Minaur Baia Mare or simply Minaur, is a Romanian professional association football club based in Baia Mare, Maramureș County, founded in 1948. The present football section is part of the municipally owned CS Minaur Baia Mare multi-sport club. The Maramureș County Football Association lists the current football section as established in 2017, with yellow and blue as its colours and the Viorel Mateianu Stadium as its home ground. The team currently competes in Liga III, the third tier of the Romanian football league system.

The present side follows a much older football tradition in Baia Mare, but that history was not institutionally uninterrupted. The post-war club generally associated with the names Minerul, FC Baia Mare and FC Maramureș was formed in 1948 following the merger of Phoenix Baia Mare and Minaur, the latter having previously been known as Tricolor Baia Mare. That club ceased activity in 2010 amid serious financial problems. A new club, FC Municipal Baia Mare, was created in 2012 and withdrew from all competitions organised by the Romanian Football Federation in August 2016.

The historical FC Baia Mare lineage spent seven seasons in the Romanian top flight, achieving its best result with a fourth-place finish in 1979–80. It also reached two Cupa României finals, in 1959 and 1982, and represented Romania in the 1982–83 European Cup Winners' Cup, where it faced Real Madrid.

== History ==
=== Origins and the post-war club ===
The roots of the historical Baia Mare side came from two clubs formed during the interwar period. Tricolor Baia Mare was founded in 1927 under the patronage of the local mining administration, while Phoenix, the works team of the city's chemical industry, appeared in 1932. Tricolor used the name Minaur between 1946 and 1948. In 1948, Minaur and Phoenix merged and the resulting team entered competition as CSM Baia Mare.

The club went through several names during the 1950s. It became Metalul Baia Mare in 1950, Energia Trustul Miner in 1956 and Minerul in 1958, before returning briefly to the CSM and CSO names. On the field, Metalul was relegated from Divizia B in 1955, but immediately returned after winning its 1956 Divizia C series. The team reached its first major national final in the 1958–59 Cupa României, losing 0–4 to Dinamo București.

The Minerul name was restored in 1962. Two years later, the club won Series II of the 1963–64 Divizia B and earned its first promotion to the top division as the post-war Baia Mare side. Its stay in 1964–65 Divizia A lasted one season, with Minerul finishing 13th and returning to the second tier.

=== FC Baia Mare and the Mateianu era ===
In 1975, Minerul was renamed FC Baia Mare. The most successful period in the club's history began after Viorel Mateianu took charge during the second half of the 1970s. His side won promotion in 1977–78, then finished fifth in its first season back in Divizia A and fourth in 1979–80, which remains the club's highest top-flight placing.

Baia Mare was relegated in 1980–81, but the following season produced one of the club's best cup runs. Although playing in Divizia B, FC Baia Mare reached the 1981–82 Cupa României final, where Dinamo București won 3–2. As Dinamo also qualified for the European Cup as league champions, Baia Mare entered the following season's European Cup Winners' Cup.

The draw paired FC Baia Mare with Real Madrid in the first round. The first leg, played in Baia Mare on 15 September 1982, ended 0–0 in front of a reported 25,000 spectators. Real won the return at the Santiago Bernabéu Stadium 5–2, with Alexandru Koller and Viorel Buzgău scoring for the Romanian side. During the summer of 1982, the team also recorded a notable friendly victory in Italy, beating Fiorentina 3–1 in Florence.

FC Baia Mare won Divizia B again in 1982–83. Its next spell in the top division lasted two seasons: the club finished 15th in 1983–84 before being relegated from 17th place a year later. In 1985, it adopted the name FC Maramureș Baia Mare.

=== FC Maramureș and the end of the historical club ===
FC Maramureș spent most of the following decade in the second division. It came close to promotion several times, finishing runner-up in its series in 1985–86, 1986–87 and 1991–92. The 1992–93 Cupa României brought another notable run, with the team reaching the semi-finals.

Promotion finally came in 1993–94, when FC Maramureș won Series II. The return to Divizia A was again brief: it finished 17th in 1994–95 and was relegated after one season. The club reverted to the name FC Baia Mare in 1998, but fell into Divizia C at the end of 1998–99. It responded by winning Series VI in 1999–2000 and returned immediately to the second division.

In 2000–01, Baia Mare finished second in Series II and defeated Foresta Fălticeni on the away-goals rule in the promotion/relegation play-off, thereby earning a place in Divizia A. The club did not take up the promotion, however: its top-flight place was sold to FCM Bacău.

In the 2004–05 season, FC Baia Mare began with a seven-point deduction carried over from the previous campaign for failing to achieve the required points threshold. Coached initially by Ioan Tătăran, who left in November 2004 to join Unirea Dej, the team was subsequently led by Lucian Bălan until the winter break, when Adalbert Rozsnyai took charge and guided the side to a 9th-place finish out of 14 in Series IX. Rozsnyai then led FC Baia Mare to promotion at the end of the 2005–06 Divizia C season, winning Series VIII. The squad included, among others, Bota, Han, Paul, Dărăbuș, Ciceu, Colar, M. Pop, Hodor, Bichiri, Negrea, Szentlaszloi, Petrovan, Fabian, Popan and Batin.

The club soon encountered serious financial difficulties, and a hesitant start to the 2006–07 campaign resulted in Rozsnyai’s dismissal, with assistant coach Emil Kemenes taking over. In January 2007, Leontin Grozavu was appointed head coach but resigned in May 2007, and assistant Florin Mureșan briefly led the team before Emil Kemenes returned to finish the season. Despite these changes, FC Baia Mare finished 16th in Series II and was relegated. During this period, Brazilian Ayres Cerqueira Simão became the first foreign player in the club’s history.

In the 2007–08 season, FC Baia Mare, considered a strong contender for promotion, suffered a poor run of results and a players’ strike caused by unpaid wages due to financial instability, leading to Emil Kemenes being replaced by Ioan Tătăran during the second half of the campaign, and despite the managerial change, the club finished only 3rd in Series VI, remaining in the third tier. At the start of the 2008–09 season, Florin Fabian was appointed head coach and strengthened the squad with experienced first-division players such as Daniel Rednic and Sorin Iodi. FC Baia Mare went on to win Series VI, finishing eighteen points ahead of Silvania Șimleu Silvaniei and securing promotion back to Liga II.

In the 2009–10 Liga II season, coached by Florin Fabian in the first half and Ciprian Danciu in the second, the team finished 8th in Series II, with a squad that included Bota, Moțoc, Șomcherechi, Duruș, Hodor, Toma, Cornea, Hotico, Ernszt, Negrea, Rednic, Iațu, Drule, Vanca, Ardelean, Bumba, Pop, Chiorean, Pereș, Bichiri, Roszel and Tănasă. Despite this mid-table result, mounting debts and the withdrawal of financial support from the Maramureș County Council ultimately pushed the club into bankruptcy.

=== Successor projects and FC Municipal ===
After the dissolution, the football tradition in Baia Mare was continued by FC Maramureș Universitar Baia Mare, founded in 2010, but in 2012, due to the lack of financial support from the local authorities, FCMU relocated to Zlatna, leaving the city without a senior football team. Subsequently, FC Municipal Baia Mare was established and enrolled in the 2012–13 Liga IV Maramureș County season, and under the guidance of Ioan Onciu, the team won the South Series, defeated Iza Dragomirești, the North Series winners, 6–0 in the county final, and then overcame Heniu Prundu Bârgăului, the Bistrița-Năsăud County winners, 5–0 in the promotion play-off to secure promotion to Liga III, with a squad that included, among others, Danciu, Giurgiu, Hodor, Toma, Iațu, Gherman, Balmoș, Ignat, Vanca, Lazăr, Ernszt, Răduneață, Feraru, Ardeleanu and Moldovan.

FCM finished 6th in Liga III in 2013–14 and won Series V the following season, gaining promotion to Liga II. The newly promoted side made a strong start to the 2015–16 campaign and reached the promotion play-off group. It eventually finished 6th, while also reaching the round of 16 of the Cupa României, where it was eliminated by FCSB after a penalty shoot-out. Financial problems prevented the project from continuing. On 5 August 2016, the Romanian Football Federation formally recorded FCM Baia Mare's withdrawal from all competitions organised by the federation.

=== CS Minaur era ===
The current multi-sport Club Sportiv Minaur Baia Mare had been created by the Baia Mare Local Council in May 2015 as a public institution subordinated to the municipality. A football section was added in 2017, with the Maramureș County Football Association recording that year as the foundation date of the present team.

Minaur began in the 2017–18 Liga IV campaign and won the Maramureș title after defeating Bradul Vișeu de Sus 11–0 on aggregate in the county championship play-off. The club also won the Maramureș County phase of the Cupa României, beating Zorile Moisei 6–0 in the final. Minaur subsequently won the inter-county promotion play-off and entered Liga III.

After finishing third in 2018–19, Minaur was runner-up in its Liga III series in the shortened 2019–20 season. It met local rival Comuna Recea in a promotion play-off: each side won its home leg 2–1, before Recea secured promotion on penalties.

Minaur won Series X in 2020–21, but its promotion bid ended against Unirea Dej, following a 0–0 draw in Baia Mare and a 1–3 defeat away. The club again won its series in 2021–22. This time it eliminated Metalurgistul Cugir 7–2 on aggregate and then overturned a 1–2 first-leg defeat against Hunedoara by winning the return 4–1 at the Viorel Mateianu Stadium, securing promotion to Liga II.

The second-tier stay lasted a single season. Minaur finished the regular part of the 2022–23 Liga II campaign in 18th place and was relegated after finishing sixth in its play-out group. Back in Liga III, the team endured a difficult 2023–24 regular season but recovered during the play-out to finish seventh overall in Series X.

Minaur returned to the top of Series X in 2024–25. In the promotion semi-final it won 2–1 away to Politehnica Timișoara, but lost the return by the same score after extra time and was eliminated in the subsequent penalty shoot-out.

In 2025–26, Minaur finished first in the regular season of Series X but carried seven points into the cross-series promotion play-off and eventually placed sixth in Play-off Series IV. Paul Pîrvulescu was appointed head coach in July 2026. For 2026–27, Minaur was allocated to Liga III Series VIII. The club reached the play-off round of the Cupa României before losing 2–3 at home to Corvinul Hunedoara, and opened the league season with victories over CSM Sighetu Marmației and Academica Recea.

== Identity and chronology of names ==
The following chronology distinguishes the historical FC Baia Mare lineage from the later clubs created after its disappearance.

Entity	Name	Period
Historical club	CSM Baia Mare	1948–1950
Historical club	Metalul Baia Mare	1950–1956
Historical club	Energia Trustul Miner Baia Mare	1956–1957
Historical club	Minerul Baia Mare	1957–1958
Historical club	CSM Baia Mare	1958–1961
Historical club	CSO Baia Mare	1961–1962
Historical club	Minerul Baia Mare	1962–1975
Historical club	FC Baia Mare	1975–1985
Historical club	FC Maramureș Baia Mare	1985–1998
Historical club	FC Baia Mare	1998–2010
Separate successor project	FC Maramureș Universitar Baia Mare	2010–2013
Later club	FC Municipal Baia Mare	2012–2016
Current football section	CS Minaur Baia Mare	2017–present

== Ground ==
Minaur plays its home matches at the Viorel Mateianu Stadium, on Câmpul Tineretului Street in Baia Mare. The current club lists the stadium as having 8,000 seats and records its most recent major renovation as taking place in 2008. The Maramureș County Football Association also lists the Viorel Mateianu Stadium as Minaur's registered home ground.

Football has been played on the site for more than a century. Work on an early sports ground at the foot of Dealul Florilor began in 1922, with the arena inaugurated in April 1923. Tricolor, one of the predecessors of the post-war Baia Mare club, later used the ground. A major enlargement began in February 1946, and the rebuilt stadium was inaugurated on 9 August 1953 under the name Stadionul 23 August.

After the fall of the communist regime, the arena became known as Dealul Florilor. It was one of the best-attended provincial football grounds in Romania during FC Baia Mare's successful period in the late 1970s. Contemporary retrospectives estimate that it held around 20,000 spectators at the time, while some major matches attracted crowds of more than 30,000, with supporters also watching from the hillside behind the goal.

In December 2009, the Baia Mare Local Council renamed the stadium in honour of Viorel Mateianu, the coach associated with the club's most successful top-flight period. Municipal records confirm that H.C.L. 490/2009 formally assigned the Viorel Mateianu name to the former Dealul Florilor Stadium.

One of the most notable matches played at the ground was the 0–0 draw with Real Madrid in September 1982, when the stadium was still known as 23 August. RomanianSoccer records an attendance of 25,000 for the European Cup Winners' Cup tie.

== Honours ==
=== Domestic ===
Divizia A / Liga I

- Best finish: 4th – 1979–80

Divizia B / Liga II

- Winners (4): 1963–64, 1977–78, 1982–83, 1993–94
- Runners-up (11): 1959–60, 1960–61, 1965–66, 1966–67, 1971–72, 1981–82, 1985–86, 1986–87, 1991–92, 2000–01, 2001–02

Divizia C / Liga III

- Winners (8): 1956, 1999–2000, 2005–06, 2008–09, 2014–15, 2020–21, 2021–22, 2024–25
- Runners-up (1): 2019–20

Liga IV – Maramureș County

- Winners (2): 2012–13, 2017–18

Cupa României

- Runners-up (2): 1958–59, 1981–82
- Semi-finalists (1): 1992–93

Cupa României – Maramureș County

- Winners (1): 2017–18

=== European ===
European Cup Winners' Cup

- First round (1): 1982–83

== Players ==
=== First-team squad ===
As of 6 September 2026

Note: Flags indicate national team as defined under FIFA eligibility rules; some limited exceptions apply. Players may hold more than one non-FIFA nationality.

No.	Pos.	Nation	Player
1	GK	ROU	Andrei Tancău
12	GK	ROU	Cristian Breban
73	GK	ROU	Marco Șuldac
3	DF	ROU	Mihai Șandru
4	DF	ROU	Vlad Fărcășan
22	DF	ROU	Darius Mureșan
30	DF	ROU	Sebastian Radu
79	DF	ROU	Cristian Iosif
89	DF	ROU	Florin Bălan
90	DF	ROU	Costin Ghiocel
6	MF	ROU	Raul Krausz
7	MF	ROU	Emanuel Dat
8	MF	ROU	Raul Șteau

No.	Pos.	Nation	Player
10	MF	ROU	Andy Bădici
11	MF	ROU	Raphael Stănescu
14	MF	ROU	Dragoș Nedelcu
17	MF	ROU	Denis Buhai
19	MF	ROU	Raul Vitan
27	MF	ROU	Dorin Toma
47	MF	ROU	Robert Filip
88	MF	ROU	Alessio Calotă
97	MF	ROU	Viorel Chinde
9	FW	ROU	Alexandru Buziuc
29	FW	ROU	Paul Mercioiu
80	FW	ROU	David Ilcu
93	FW	ROU	David Ciubăncan

=== Notable former players ===
RomanianSoccer's historical profile of FC Baia Mare highlights, among others, the following players who represented the club during its post-war history.

- (Romania) Necula Răducanu
- (Romania) Lucian Bălan
- (Romania) Ioan Tătăran
- (Romania) Anton Weissenbacher
- (Romania) Alexandru Koller
- (Romania) Dionisiu Bumb
- (Romania) Mircea Sasu
- (Romania) Alexandru Terheș
- (Romania) Romulus Buia
- (Romania) Vasile Miriuță
- (Romania) Daniel Rednic
- (Romania) Dănuț Șomcherechi
- (Romania) Ciprian Vasilache
- (Romania) Ioan Oană
- (Romania) Marius Bilașco
- (Romania) Sandu Negrean
- (Romania) Gabriel Cânu

== Club officials ==
Role	Name	Source
Director	(Romania) Ioachim Nicolae Făt	
Head coach	(Romania) Paul Pîrvulescu	
Assistant coach	(Romania) Dănuț Șomcherechi	

== League and cup history ==
The table combines the competitive record of the historical FC Baia Mare lineage through 2010, FC Municipal Baia Mare between 2012 and 2016, and the current CS Minaur football section from 2017. FC Maramureș Universitar, active between 2010 and 2013, was a separate club and is not included in the seasonal record below. Historical league positions are based on RomanianSoccer and RSSSF records, while the later entries are supported by FRF, AJF Maramureș and CS Minaur sources.

Season	Tier	Division	Place	Cupa României	Europe
CS Minaur Baia Mare
2026–27	3	Liga III (Seria VIII)	TBD	Play-off round	
2025–26	3	Liga III (Seria X / play-off IV)	6th (play-off)	Second round	
2024–25	3	Liga III (Seria X)	1st (C)	Play-off round	
2023–24	3	Liga III (Seria X)	7th	Third round	
2022–23	2	Liga II	18th (R)	Group stage	
2021–22	3	Liga III (Seria X)	1st (C, P)	Round of 16	
2020–21	3	Liga III (Seria X)	1st (C)	Third round	
2019–20	3	Liga III (Seria V)	2nd	Third round	
2018–19	3	Liga III (Seria V)	3rd	Third round	
2017–18	4	Liga IV	1st (C, P)	County winners	
2016–17	No senior team in league competition				
FC Municipal Baia Mare
2015–16	2	Liga II (Seria II)	6th	Round of 16	
2014–15	3	Liga III (Seria V)	1st (C, P)	Third round	
2013–14	3	Liga III (Seria V)	6th	Third round	
2012–13	4	Liga IV	1st (C, P)		
2010–12	Historical FC Baia Mare inactive; FC Maramureș Universitar was a separate club				
Historical FC Baia Mare lineage
2009–10	2	Liga II (Seria II)	8th	Fourth round	
2008–09	3	Liga III (Seria VI)	1st (C, P)		
2007–08	3	Liga III (Seria VI)	3rd	Round of 32	
2006–07	2	Liga II (Seria II)	16th (R)		
2005–06	3	Divizia C (Seria VIII)	1st (C, P)		
2004–05	3	Divizia C (Seria IX)	9th		
2003–04	2	Divizia B (Seria III)	15th (R)		
2002–03	2	Divizia B (Seria II)	14th	Round of 16	
2001–02	2	Divizia B (Seria II)	2nd		
2000–01	2	Divizia B (Seria II)	2nd (P)	Round of 16	
1999–00	3	Divizia C (Seria VI)	1st (C, P)		
1998–99	2	Divizia B (Seria II)	17th (R)		
1997–98	2	Divizia B (Seria II)	3rd	Round of 32	
1996–97	2	Divizia B (Seria II)	14th		
1995–96	2	Divizia B (Seria II)	13th		
1994–95	1	Divizia A	17th (R)	Quarter-finals	
1993–94	2	Divizia B (Seria II)	1st (C, P)		
1992–93	2	Divizia B (Seria II)	6th	Semi-finals	
1991–92	2	Divizia B (Seria III)	2nd		
1990–91	2	Divizia B (Seria III)	4th		
1989–90	2	Divizia B (Seria III)	3rd		

Season	Tier	Division	Place	Cupa României	Europe
1988–89	2	Divizia B (Seria III)	6th		
1987–88	2	Divizia B (Seria III)	4th	Round of 16	
1986–87	2	Divizia B (Seria III)	2nd		
1985–86	2	Divizia B (Seria III)	2nd		
1984–85	1	Divizia A	17th (R)	Quarter-finals	
1983–84	1	Divizia A	15th	Round of 32	
1982–83	2	Divizia B (Seria III)	1st (C, P)		ECWC
1981–82	2	Divizia B (Seria III)	2nd	Final	
1980–81	1	Divizia A	17th (R)	Round of 32	
1979–80	1	Divizia A	4th	Round of 32	
1978–79	1	Divizia A	5th	Round of 32	
1977–78	2	Divizia B (Seria III)	1st (C, P)		
1976–77	2	Divizia B (Seria III)	3rd		
1975–76	2	Divizia B (Seria III)	3rd	Round of 16	
1974–75	2	Divizia B (Seria III)	3rd		
1973–74	2	Divizia B (Seria III)	5th	Round of 16	
1972–73	2	Divizia B (Seria II)	4th		
1971–72	2	Divizia B (Seria II)	2nd	Round of 32	
1970–71	2	Divizia B (Seria II)	10th		
1969–70	2	Divizia B (Seria II)	3rd		
1968–69	2	Divizia B (Seria II)	13th	Round of 32	
1967–68	2	Divizia B (Seria II)	4th	Round of 32	
1966–67	2	Divizia B (Seria II)	2nd	Quarter-finals	
1965–66	2	Divizia B (Seria II)	2nd	Round of 32	
1964–65	1	Divizia A	13th (R)	Round of 16	
1963–64	2	Divizia B (Seria II)	1st (C, P)	Round of 16	
1962–63	2	Divizia B (Seria III)	3rd	Quarter-finals	
1961–62	2	Divizia B (Seria III)	6th	Round of 16	
1960–61	2	Divizia B (Seria III)	2nd		
1959–60	2	Divizia B (Seria III)	2nd		
1958–59	2	Divizia B (Seria I)	9th	Final	
1957–58	2	Divizia B (Seria I)	4th		
1956	3	Divizia C (Seria III)	1st (C, P)		
1955	2	Divizia B (Seria II)	11th (R)	Round of 32	
1954	2	Divizia B (Seria II)	4th		
1953	2	Divizia B (Seria II)	13th	Round of 32	
1952	2	Divizia B (Seria II)	6th		
1951	2	Divizia B (Seria II)	4th		
1950	2	Divizia B (Seria II)	6th	Round of 32	
1948–49	2	Divizia B (Seria II)	3rd		

Note: FC Baia Mare earned promotion through the 2000–01 play-off, but its place in the following Divizia A season was subsequently sold to FCM Bacău, so the club remained in Divizia B.
