= China Petroleum Corporation =

China Petroleum Corporation may refer to:

- CPC Corporation, Taiwan, formerly known as "Chinese Petroleum Corporation", operating from Taiwan as a state-owned company of the Republic of China
- China National Petroleum Corporation, a state-owned company of the People's Republic of China operating in mainland China
- China Petroleum & Chemical Corporation, Sinopec
