= Alexandru Gego =

Romanian footballer

Personal information
- Full name: Alexandru Decebal Gego
- Date of birth: 12 December 1983 (age 42)
- Place of birth: Oradea, Romania
- Height: 1.87 m (6 ft 2 in)
- Position: Forward

Youth career
- Bihor Oradea

Senior career*
Years	Team	Apps	(Gls)
2002–2003	FC Oradea	1	(0)
2003–2004	CSM Reșița	11	(1)
2004	FC Oradea	0	(0)
2005	Unirea Dej	13	(1)
2005	Unirea Alba Iulia	11	(1)
2006	Olimpia Satu Mare	12	(1)
2006–2009	Gaz Metan Mediaș	23	(5)
2009	→ Târgu Mureș (loan)		(1)
2010	Victoria Brănești		(1)
2010	Silvania Șimleu Silvaniei	6	(0)
2011–2012	FCMU Baia Mare	10	(3)
2012	FC Cisnădie		
2012–2013	FCMU Baia Mare	15	(1)
2013–2014	Oșorhei		
2014–2015	Partium Oradea		
2015–2021	Unirea Valea lui Mihai	77	(21)
Total		179+	(36+)
- * Club domestic league appearances and goals as of 11:24, 14 July 2023 (UTC)

Alexandru Decebal Gego (born 12 December 1983) is a Romanian former professional footballer who played as a forward. In his career Gego also played for: FC Bihor Oradea, CSM Reșița, Unirea Alba Iulia, Olimpia Satu Mare, Gaz Metan Mediaș or Unirea Valea lui Mihai, among others.
