= Unirea Stadium (Dej) =

Sports venue in Dej, Romania

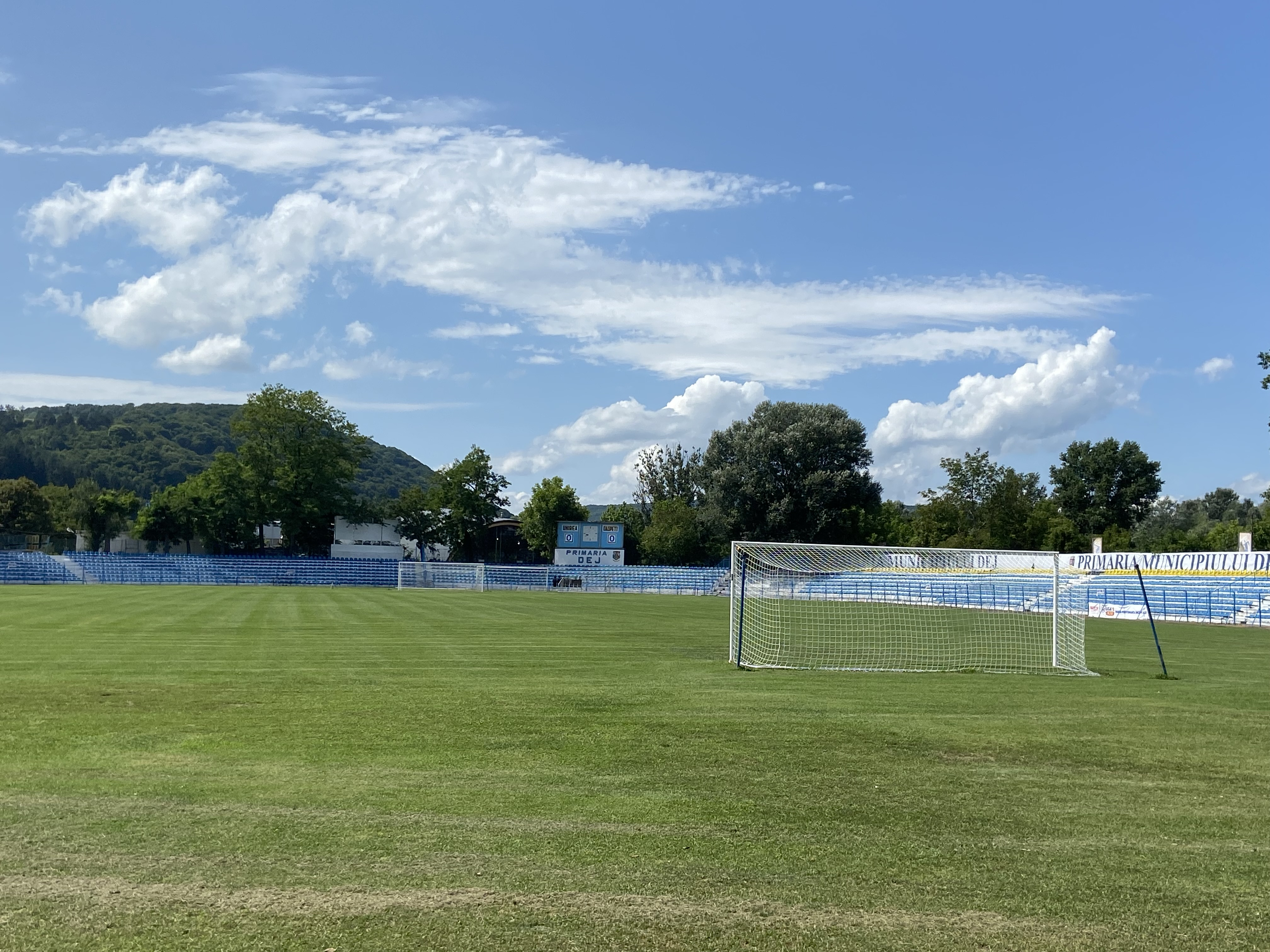
- Interactive map of Unirea Stadium
- Address: Str. Nicolae Titulescu, nr. 16A
- Location: Dej, Romania
- Coordinates: 47°08′50.1″N 23°52′20.2″E
- Owner: Municipality of Dej
- Operator: Unirea Dej
- Capacity: 6,000 seated
- Surface: Grass

Construction
- Opened: 1920s
- Renovated: 2021

Tenant
- Unirea Dej (1921–present)

The Unirea Stadium is a multi-purpose stadium in Dej, Romania. It is currently used mostly for football matches and is the home ground of Unirea Dej.
