= Romulus Buia =

Romanian footballer

Personal information
- Full name: Romulus Adrian Buia
- Date of birth: 15 June 1970 (age 56)
- Place of birth: Baia Mare, Romania
- Height: 1.73 m (5 ft 8 in)
- Position: Attacking midfielder

Team information
- Current team: Minaur Baia Mare (assistant)

Senior career*
Years	Team	Apps	(Gls)
1988–1989	Minerul Cavnic	20	(7)
1989–1992	FC Maramureș Baia Mare	50	(9)
1993–1995	Germinal Ekeren	22	(4)
1994–1995	→ Universitatea Craiova (loan)	24	(6)
1996	Sportul Studenţesc	21	(3)
1996–1998	Universitatea Craiova	50	(5)
1998–1999	Progresul Șomcuta Mare	30	(15)
2000–2001	Rocar București	25	(3)
2001	Dinamo București	9	(0)
2002	Gloria Bistrița	5	(0)
2002–2004	Politehnica Timişoara	48	(3)
2005–2006	Pandurii Târgu Jiu	20	(1)
2006	FCM Reșița	9	(0)
2006–2007	Fortuna Covaci	30	(17)
2007–2010	FC Chișoda	21	(9)
2010–2011	FCMU Baia Mare	2	(0)
Total		386	(82)

International career
1991–1992	Romania	2	(0)

Managerial career
- 2010–2012: FCMU Baia Mare
- 2012: FCMU Baia Mare (sporting director)
- 2013: FCMU Baia Mare
- 2015–2019: Comuna Recea
- 2020: Minaur Baia Mare (technical director)
- 2020–2021: Poli Timișoara (technical director)
- 2021: Sighetu Marmației
- 2022–2023: Academica Recea
- 2023–: Minaur Baia Mare (assistant)
- * Club domestic league appearances and goals

Romulus "Romică" Buia (born 15 June 1970 in Baia Mare) is a Romanian former football player and currently a manager. He was nicknamed "Figo from Berceni" by the fans of Rocar București which played the home games on the "Drumul Găzarului" field in the Berceni Neighborhood in Bucharest, because of the similarities with the Portuguese football star Luís Figo. His son Darius Buia is also a footballer.

== Career ==
Buia made his professional debut at the age of 18, playing for Minerul Cavnic in the Romanian Divizia B, before joining FC Baia Mare at the age of 19, a club also from Divizia B.

In 1991, at the age of 21, he made his international debut against United States in a friendly game. He also played for Romania national football team in 1992, this time against Mexico.

FC Barcelona paid a close attention to him during the 1991–92 season. In the summer of 1992, Johan Cruijff, the Catalan side coach, invited him to train with the team but in the end the transfer did not materialised.

Buia started the 1992–93 at FC Baia Mare but was then transferred to Germinal Ekeren (3550) of Belgium during the season. He played in Belgium for two years, before being loaned back to Romania, this time at Universitatea Craiova, therefore making his debut in Romanian top league, Divizia A. In 1995, he returned to Ekeren but after at half season he terminated his contract and returned in Romania, signing a contract with Sportul Studenţesc of Bucharest, before joining again Universitatea Craiova for two seasons.

In 1998 his contract with Universitatea Craiova terminated and he failed to find another one with a top team, and therefore played for Progresul Şomcuta Mare, a team from the Romanian fourth division.

In 2000, he returned to Divizia A after signing a contract with Rocar București. After only a year he joined Dinamo București but left the team at the end of 2001 to play for Gloria Bistriţa.

In 2002, he was signed by Politehnica Timișoara, where he stayed until 2005, before being sacked by the new Timișoara coach, Cosmin Olăroiu and subsequently joining Pandurii Târgu Jiu.

In the season 2005–06 he played at FCM Reșița in Liga II before signing for AS Covaci in Romanian Liga IV.

Between 2007 and 2011 he played for FC Chişoda in Liga IV and FCMU Baia Mare in Liga III.

Then he became the manager of FCMU Baia Mare between 2011 and 2013 until the dissolution of the club.

From July 2015, he is the manager of Liga III club, ACSF Comuna Recea.
