= Alpár Mészáros =

Romanian footballer and manager

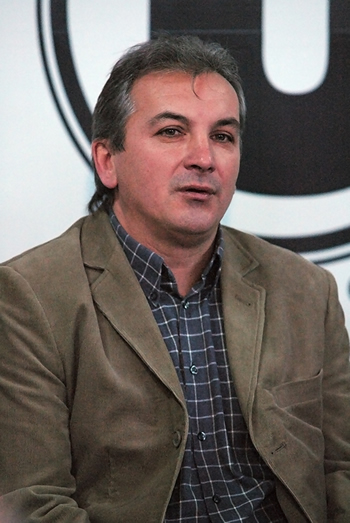
- Mészáros in 2009

Personal information
- Date of birth: 22 November 1964 (age 61)
- Place of birth: Cluj-Napoca, Romania
- Position: Defender

Youth career
- Universitatea Cluj

Senior career*
Years	Team	Apps	(Gls)
1982–1988	Universitatea Cluj	107	(5)
1989–1990	Dinamo București	15	(1)
1990–1991	Volán		
1992–1993	Rot Weiss Waldorf		
- Flensburg 08

Managerial career
- 2002–2005: 1.FC Gelnhausen
- 2007–2008: ISCT
- 2008: Universitatea Cluj
- 2009–2011: Unirea Florești
- 2015–2016: Unirea Dej
- 2016–2017: Unirea Jucu
- 2017: Unirea Dej
- 2018–2019: Odorheiu Secuiesc
- 2020–2021: Someșul Dej
- 2021–2022: Odorheiu Secuiesc (technical director)
- 2022: Minerul Ocna Dej (president)
- * Club domestic league appearances and goals

Alpár "Mesi" Mészáros (born 22 November 1964) is a Romanian football manager and former player.

== Club career ==
Mészáros started his football career at U Cluj. He was transferred to Dinamo București and later, he went abroad to the Hungarian side Volán FC. In 1991 Alpár Mészáros moved to Germany where he played until the end of his career at Rot Weiss Waldorf and Flensburg 08.

== Coaching career ==
Between 2002 and 2005, Mészáros trained SG Altenhaßlau / Eidengesäß from Germany. In 2007, he accepted to train the second division Romanian team ISCT. In January 2008 Alpár Mészáros started to coach the Liga I team, U Cluj. He was dismissed on 20 August 2008.

== Personal life ==
Mészáros lives in Cluj-Napoca, Romania.

== Honours ==
=== Player ===
Universitatea Cluj

- Divizia B: 1984–85

Dinamo București

- Divizia A: 1989–90
