= Lipănești =

- Commune
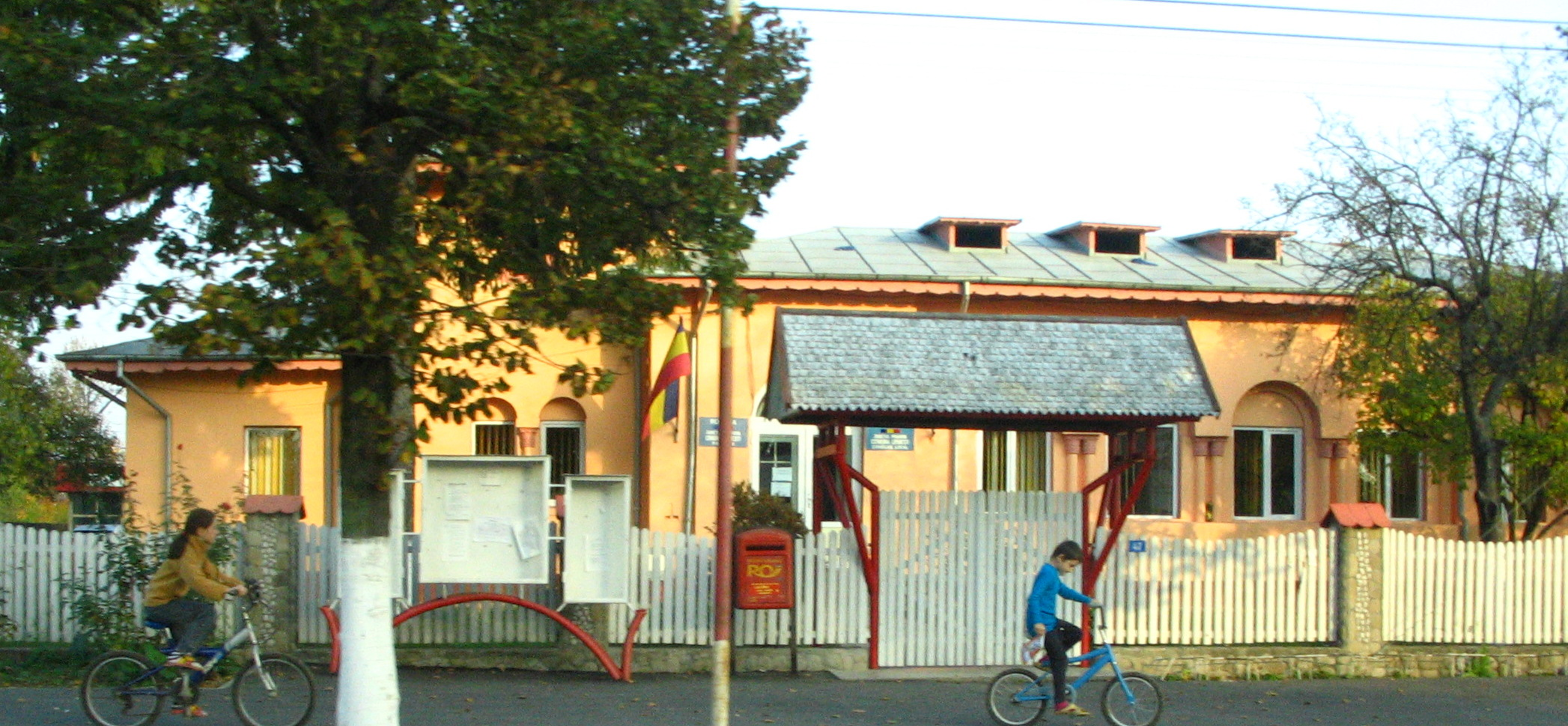
- Lipănești

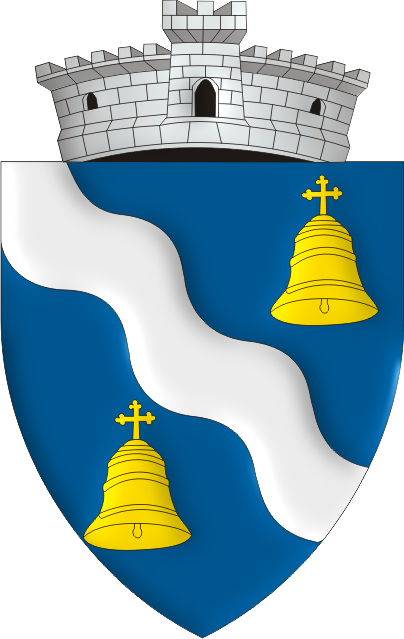
- Coat of arms

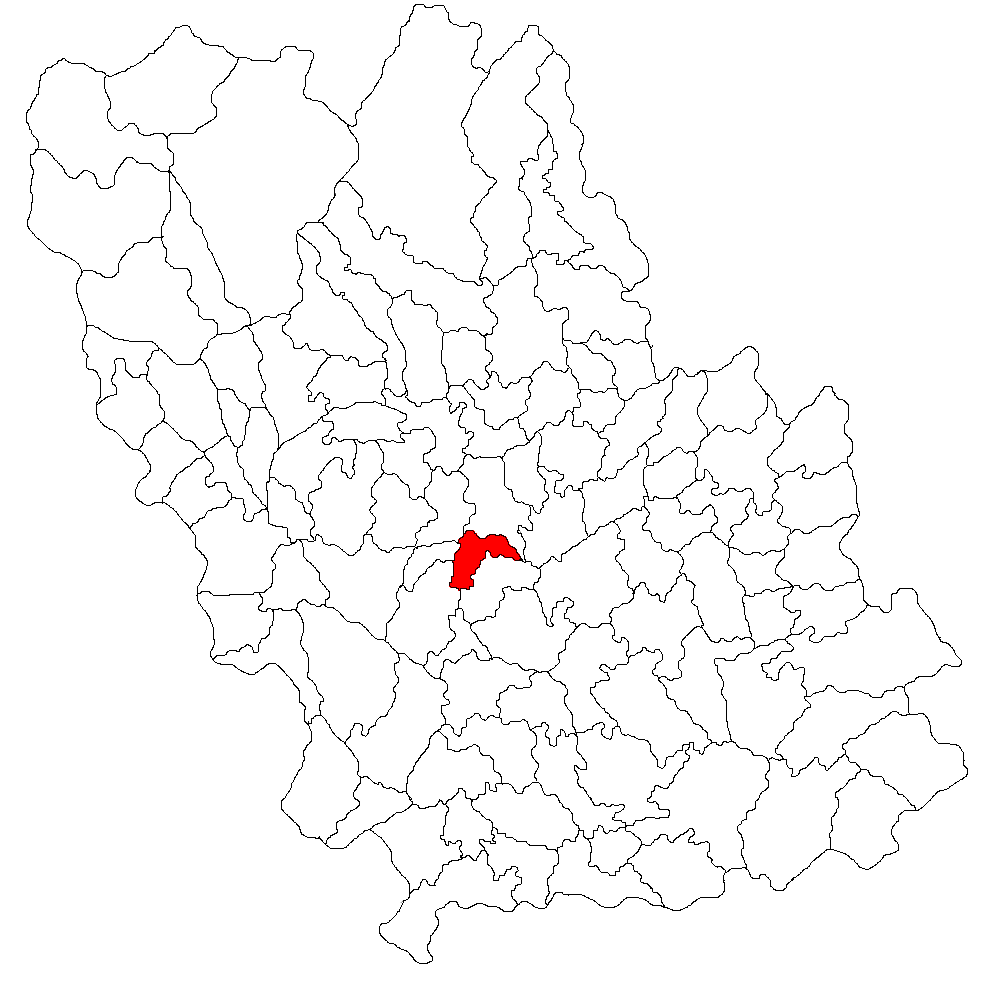
- Location in Prahova County

- Location in Romania
- Coordinates: 45°3′N 26°1′E
- Country: Romania
- County: Prahova

Government
  - Mayor (2020–2024): Robert Viorel Nica (PNL)
- Area: 18.2 km^{2} (7.0 sq mi)
- Elevation: 217 m (712 ft)
- Population (2021-12-01): 5,264
  - Density: 289/km^{2} (749/sq mi)
- Time zone: UTC+02:00 (EET)
  - Summer (DST): UTC+03:00 (EEST)
- Postal code: 107340
- Area code: +(40) 244
- Vehicle reg.: PH
- Website: lipanesti.ro

Lipănești is a commune in Prahova County, Muntenia, Romania. It is composed of four villages: Lipănești, Satu Nou, Șipotu, and Zamfira.

Zamfira Monastery is located in Lipănești.

Historical population
Year	Pop.	±%
1992	4,858	—
2002	5,068	+4.3%
2011	5,308	+4.7%
2021	5,264	−0.8%
Source: Census data

== Natives ==
- Viorel Mateianu (1938–1997), football player and coach.
