= Laur Aștilean =

Romanian footballer

Personal information
- Full name: Laur Marian Aștilean
- Date of birth: 25 July 1973 (age 53)
- Place of birth: Gherla, Romania
- Height: 1.79 m (5 ft 10 in)
- Position: Central defender

Team information
- Current team: Speranța Jucu (manager)

Senior career*
Years	Team	Apps	(Gls)
1996–1997	Unirea Dej	13	(0)
1998–2003	Universitatea Cluj	117	(8)
2003–2005	CFR Cluj	34	(0)
2005–2007	Gloria Bistrița	35	(0)
Total		199	(8)

Managerial career
- 2022–: Speranța Jucu
- * Club domestic league appearances and goals

Laur Marian Aștilean (born 25 July 1973) is a Romanian former footballer who played as a central defender.

== Honours ==
Universitatea Cluj

- Divizia C: 2000–01

CFR Cluj

- Divizia B: 2003–04
- UEFA Intertoto Cup runner-up: 2005
