= Vlasti Martinovic =

Romanian footballer

Personal information
- Full name: Vlasti Emanuel Martinovic
- Date of birth: 20 December 2004 (age 21)
- Place of birth: Drobeta Turnu-Severin, Romania
- Position: Centre-back

Team information
- Current team: Farul Constanța
- Number: 16

Youth career
- –2017: Luceafărul Drobeta Turnu Severin
- 2017–2023: Gheorghe Hagi Academy

Senior career*
Years	Team	Apps	(Gls)
2022–	Farul Constanța	1	(0)
2023–2024	→ Gloria Bistrița (loan)	21	(1)
2024–2025	→ Unirea Dej (loan)		

International career
2021	Romania U17	1	(0)
2021–2022	Romania U18	4	(0)
2023	Romania U19	3	(0)
2023	Romania U20	2	(0)
- * Club domestic league appearances and goals as of 14:49, 12 November 2024 (UTC)

Vlasti Emanuel Martinovic (born 20 December 2004) is a Romanian professional footballer who plays as a centre-back for Liga I club Farul Constanța.

== Club career ==
=== Farul Constanța ===
He made his league debut on 9 April 2022 in Liga I match against FC Argeș Pitești.

== Honours ==
Farul Constanţa

- Liga I: 2022–23

Gloria Bistrița

- Liga III: 2023–24
