= Ioan Tătăran =

Romanian footballer

Personal information
- Date of birth: 17 October 1961 (age 65)
- Place of birth: Baia Mare, Romania
- Position: Left back

Youth career
- 1979–1980: Luceafărul București

Senior career*
Years	Team	Apps	(Gls)
1980–1983	FC Baia Mare	68	(6)
1983–1985	Steaua București	40	(1)
1985–1986	FC Maramureș Baia Mare	22	(0)
1986–1988	Gloria Bistrița	42	(2)
1988–1990	Farul Constanța	50	(6)
1990–1992	Gloria Bistrița	60	(4)
1992–1994	Unirea Dej (Note: The statistics for the 1992–93 and 1993–94 Divizia C seasons are unavailable.)	3	(0)
1995	AS Sighet		
Total		285	(17)

International career
1983	Romania U21	4	(0)

Managerial career
- 1995–1996: Olimpia Gherla
- Arieșul Turda
- SESO Câmpia Turzii
- 2004: FC Baia Mare
- 2007–2008: Delta Tulcea
- 2008: FC Baia Mare
- 2010–2011: Unirea Dej
- 2011: FCMU Baia Mare (technical director)
- 2012: Astra Giurgiu II
- 2012–2013: FCMU Baia Mare
- * Club domestic league appearances and goals

Ioan Tătăran (born 17 October 1961) is a former Romanian footballer who played as a defender. After he ended his playing career he worked as a manager at teams from the Romanian lower leagues.

== Honours ==
FC Baia Mare

- Divizia B: 1982–83
- Cupa României runner-up: 1981–82

Steaua București

- Divizia A: 1984–85
- Cupa României: 1984–85, runner-up 1983–84

Unirea Dej

- Divizia C: 1993–94
