= Zamfira Monastery =

Monastery in Prahova County, Romania

Coordinates: 45°04′13″N 26°00′32″E

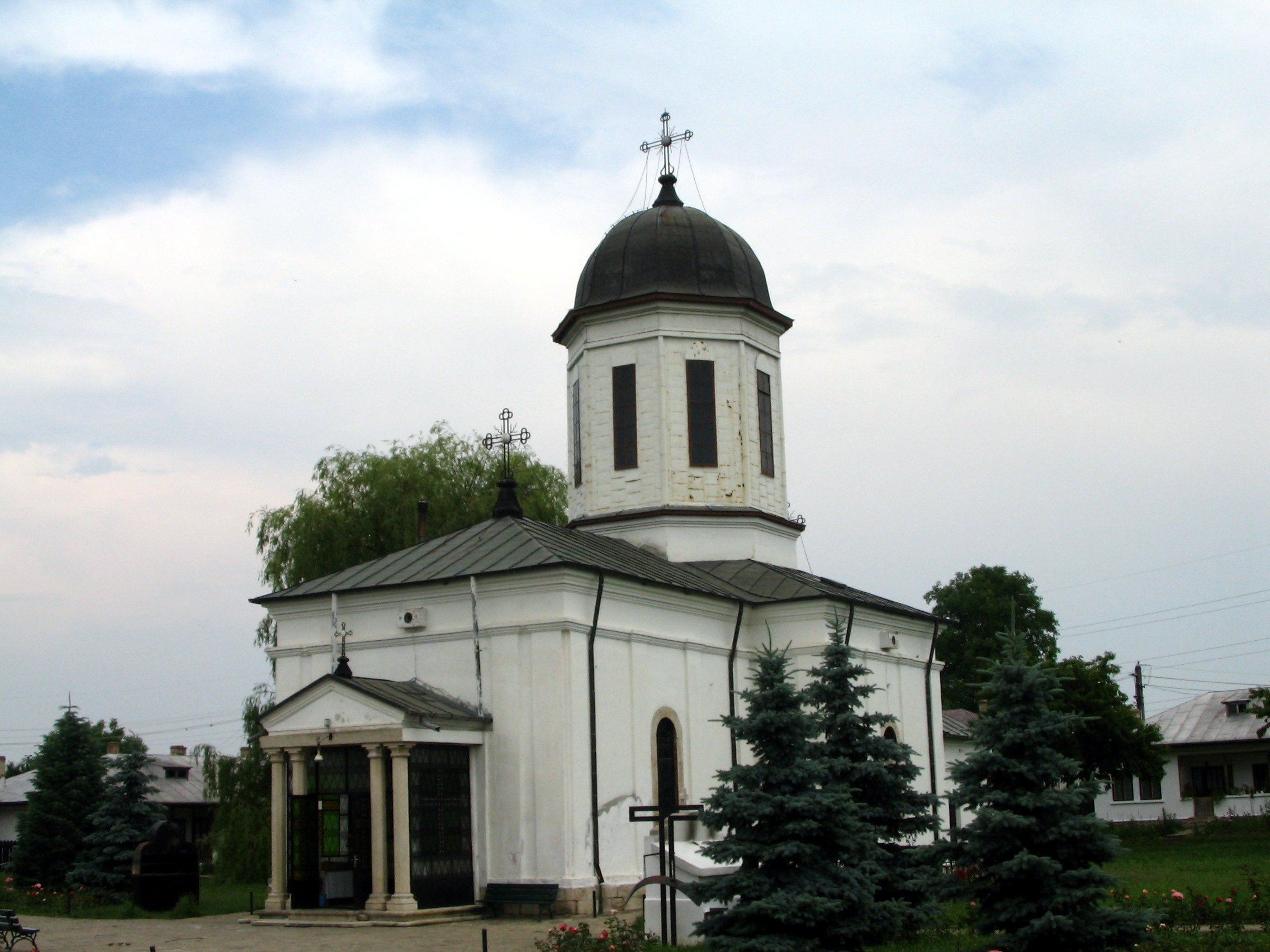

Religion
- Affiliation: Romanian Orthodox Church

Location
- Location: Lipănești, Prahova County, Romania
- Interactive map of Zamfira Monastery

Architecture
- Groundbreaking: 1721-1730
- Materials: stone, brick

The Zamfira monastery is a monastery of Eastern Orthodox nuns, located in the Lipănești commune, Prahova County, Romania.

== History ==
The church was erected in 1743, at the initiative of Zamfira Apostoli, the widow of a wealthy Wallachian salesman. As the church was damaged by earthquakes in 1802 and 1838; a newer one was built in 1858. The consecration of the church took place on 8 September 1857.

== Architecture ==
The compound is of a quadrilateral shape, with the new church in its center. The old church is outside the compound, near the cemetery.

The new church was painted in 1856-1857 by Nicolae Grigorescu, at the age of 18. Another painted involved was Master Cheladec.

== Renovation ==
The monastery suffered significant damage in the two earthquakes of 10 November 1940 and 4 March 1977. The monastery saw major restoration in 1941 and 1942. Then in 1950 further renovations were made, followed by still more in 1960, overseen by Patriarch Justinian. In 1986 and 1989, following the earthquake, there were further repairs and restorations to the buildings, under the supervision of Patriarch Teoctist.

== Gallery ==
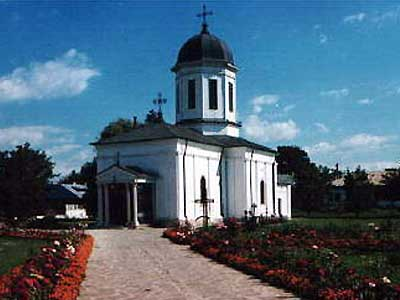
The new church

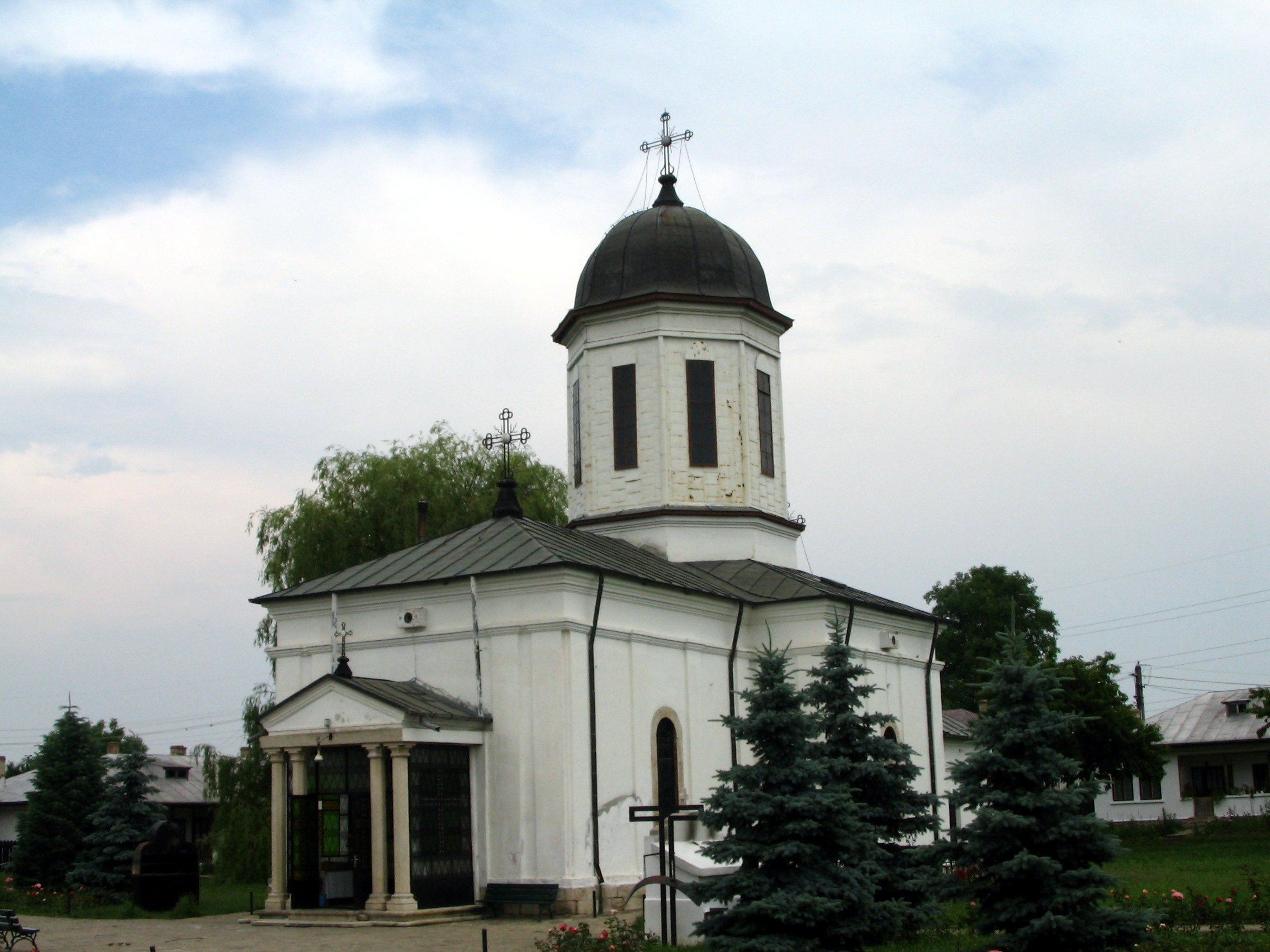
The new church

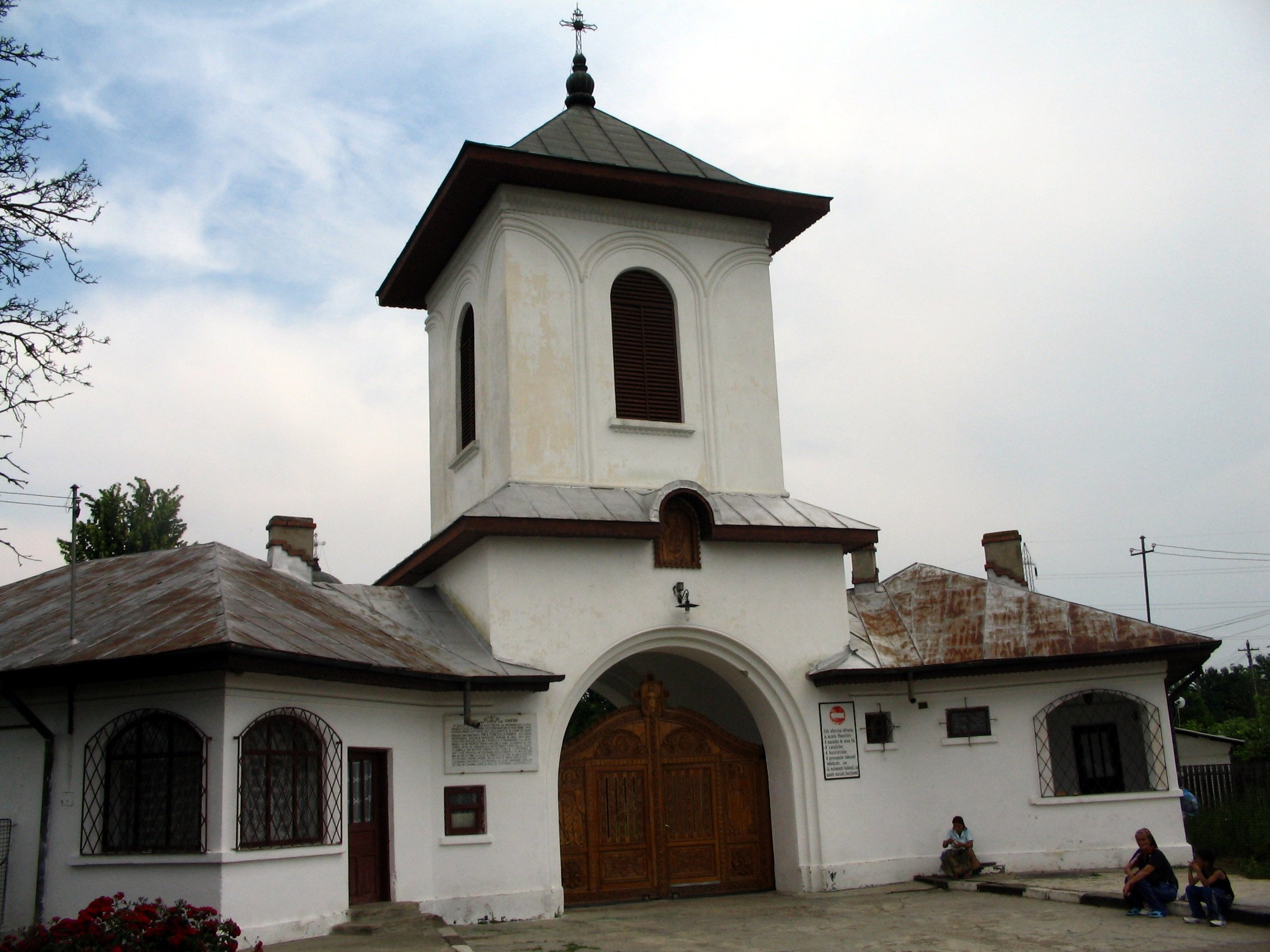
The main gate

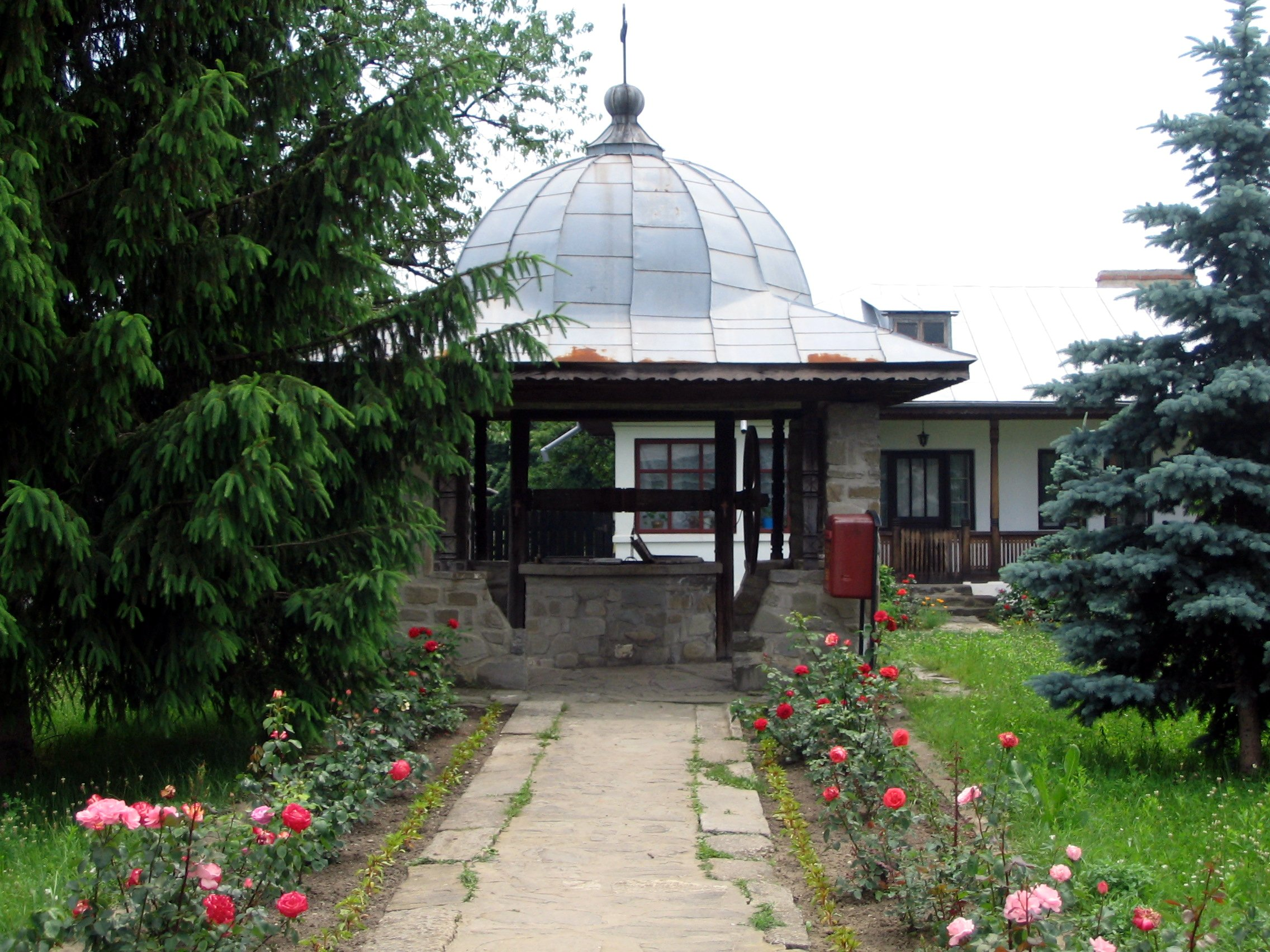
Zamfira Monastery
