= Cristian Fedor =

Romanian former footballer and coach

Personal information
- Full name: Cristian Teodor Fedor
- Date of birth: 19 November 1973 (age 52)
- Place of birth: Sighet, Romania
- Position: Defender

Youth career
- 1973–1990: CSS Sighetu Marmației

College career
| Years | Team | Apps | (Gls) |
- Babeș-Bolyai University

Senior career*
| Years | Team | Apps | (Gls) |
| 1990–1995 | Universitatea Cluj | 110 | (6) |
| 1995–1996 | Unirea Dej | 30 | (4) |
| 1996–1999 | Universitatea Cluj | 50 | (4) |
| 1999–2001 | CFR Cluj | 60 | (11) |
| 2001–2003 | DPMM FC | | |
| 2004 | Penang FA | 25 | (2) |

Managerial career
- 2005–2007: Unirea Dej (assistant)
- 2007–2010: Unirea Dej
- 2010–2011: Ontario Youth Soccer League (technical trainer)
- 2011–2014: Richmond Hill SC
- * Club domestic league appearances and goals

Cristian Teodor Fedor (born 19 November 1973 in Sighet) is a Romanian former footballer and coach.

== Playing career ==
=== Romania and Brunei ===
Despite there being discrepancies between sources on the dates Fedor played for Universitatea Cluj, CFR Cluj, and Unirea Dej, all of them agree that he has plied his trade with Brunei DPMM, finalizing the transfer in December 2001 and earning a reported 300000 dollars a year.

Featured in the 2003 ASEAN Club Championship while in DPMM FC colors.

=== Penang ===
Flying in to Penang for a trial with Penang FA of the Malaysia Super League in 2004, the defender stood at 1.90m tall. Convincing the club to sign him with his display in a practice match versus Tanjong Pagar, Fedor filled in their third foreign import slot that season and was the second Romanian to have ever plied their trade in Malaysia. In order to collect his International Transfer Certificate, he missed the season opener facing Perlis and the second round against Kedah.

== Honours ==
=== Club ===
DPMM FC

- Brunei Premier League

- Winner (1): 2002

- Brunei Super Cup

- Winner (1): 2002
