= Simão Goiano =

Brazilian footballer

Personal information
- Full name: Ayres Cerqueira Simão
- Date of birth: October 25, 1988 (age 38)
- Place of birth: Curitiba, Paranà, Brazil
- Height: 1.75 m (5 ft 9 in)
- Position: Striker

Youth career
- 2000–2005: Paraná Clube

Senior career*
Years	Team	Apps	(Gls)
2005–2006	Atlético-PR	?	(?)
2006–2007	FC Baia Mare	15	(4)
2007	Gloria Bistriţa	1	(0)
2008–2009	FC Botoşani	36	(7)
2009–2010	FCM Bacău	10	(5)
2011	Funorte Esporte Clube	0	(0)
2011–2014	Associação Atlética Anapolina	2	(1)
2014–2015	Żabbar St. Patrick	0	(0)
- * Club domestic league appearances and goals as of September 15, 2014

Ayres Cerqueira Simão (born October 25, 1988), known as Simão Goiano, is a Brazilian football player, who last played for FC Dallas.

== Career ==
He began his football career at 12, playing well for Paraná. After five years he moved to Atletico Paranaense. He injured himself and his team released him, but after a year he came in Romania playing for FC Baia Mare.

He was the top scorer of his team and he was sold by FC Baia Mare to Liga I's Gloria Bistriţa. He made only one appearance for Gloria Bistriţa in Romanian First Division, Liga I. He substituted Ion Dumitra in the 86th minute of the away game against Rapid, in the 2nd day of the season. After those 4 minutes, he never appeared even on the substitutes' bench, being sent to the satellite team, in the third league.

He moved to Liga II team FC Botoşani, in the January 2008 transfer window. After three appearances as a substitute, he became starter for FC Botoşani, playing in 16 of the 17 second half of the season fixtures. He scored his first goal on April 5, in the away game against Dunarea Giurgiu, but scored just anotherone until the end of the season.

However, in the 2008-2009 season, he managed to score 5 goals in 20 appearances (about half of them as a substitute) for FC Botoşani. In July 2009, he moved to FCM Bacău, also in Liga II. He had a great start of the season, managing to score 4 goals in the first five league games.
