= Viorel Mateianu =

Romanian footballer and coach

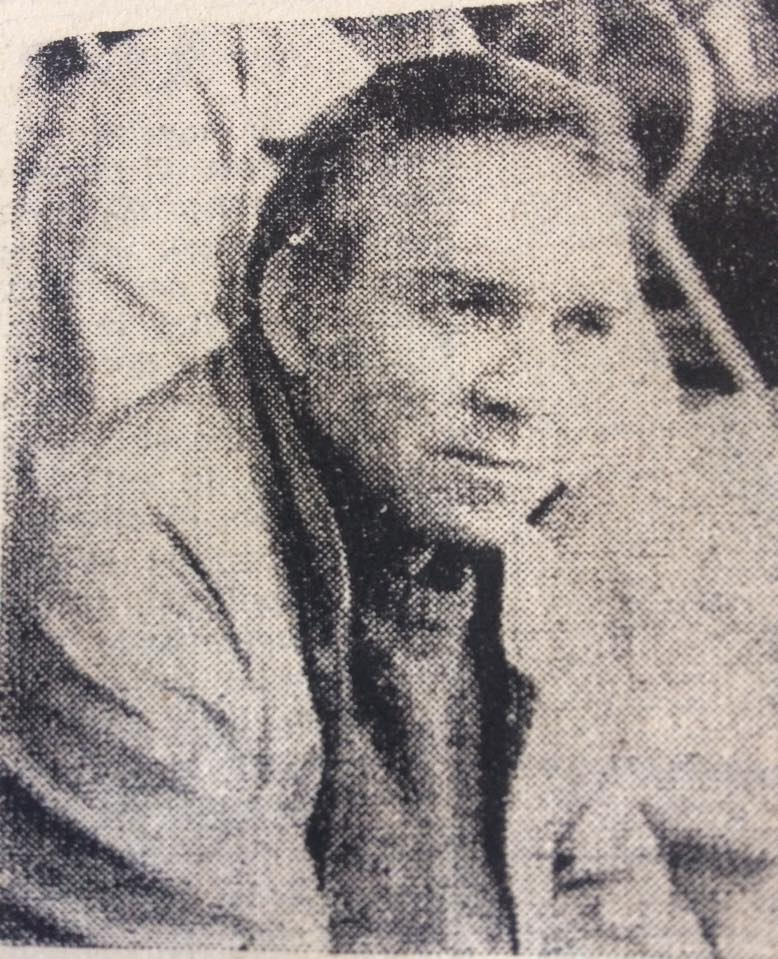
- Mateianu c. 1980

Personal information
- Date of birth: 1 June 1938
- Place of birth: Lipănești, Romania
- Date of death: 25 November 1997 (aged 59)
- Place of death: Bucharest, Romania
- Height: 1.74 m (5 ft 9 in)
- Position: Striker

Youth career
- 1950–1955: Flacăra Boldești Prahova
- 1955–1956: Progresul CPCS București

Senior career*
Years	Team	Apps	(Gls)
1957–1958	Progresul București (Note: The 1957 championship called Cupa Primăverii is unofficial, so the appearances and goals scored at that competition for Progresul București are not official.)	20	(13)
1958–1961	Știința Cluj	72	(21)
1961–1962	Steaua București	15	(3)
1963–1970	Progresul București (Note: The statistics for the 1969–70 Divizia B season are unavailable.)	140	(25)
1970–1973	TUS Wannsee Berlin		
1973	Alemannia Aachen		
Total		247	(62)

International career
1957–1961	Romania U23	4	(0)
1961	Romania B	2	(0)
1960–1966	Romania	6	(2)

Managerial career
- 1973–1976: Progresul București
- 1976–1981: Baia Mare
- 1981: Progresul București
- 1981–1982: Dacia Unirea Brăila
- 1982–1983: Petrolul Ploiești
- 1983–1984: Dacia Unirea Brăila
- 1985: Jiul Petroșani
- 1986: Danubiana București
- 1986–1987: Bihor Oradea
- 1987: Drobeta-Turnu Severin
- 1988: Bihor Oradea
- * Club domestic league appearances and goals

Viorel Mateianu (1 June 1938 – 25 November 1997) was a Romanian football player and coach.

== Club career ==
Mateianu was born on 1 June 1938 in Lipănești, Prahova County, Romania and began playing football in the Romanian lower leagues for Flacăra Boldești and Progresul CPCS București. He made his Divizia A debut under coach Ioan Lupaș on 25 August 1957, playing for Progresul București in a 3–2 victory in which he scored a goal against Energia Petroșani. Shortly afterwards, Mateianu was nicknamed "Little Alfredo Di Stéfano".

In 1957, during a football tournament held in San Sebastián, Spain where he participated with one of Romania's youth teams, Mateianu had an offer to play for Real Madrid. However, he declined it, not wanting to risk to never seeing his parents again, as he could have not been allowed to return to the country by the communist regime.

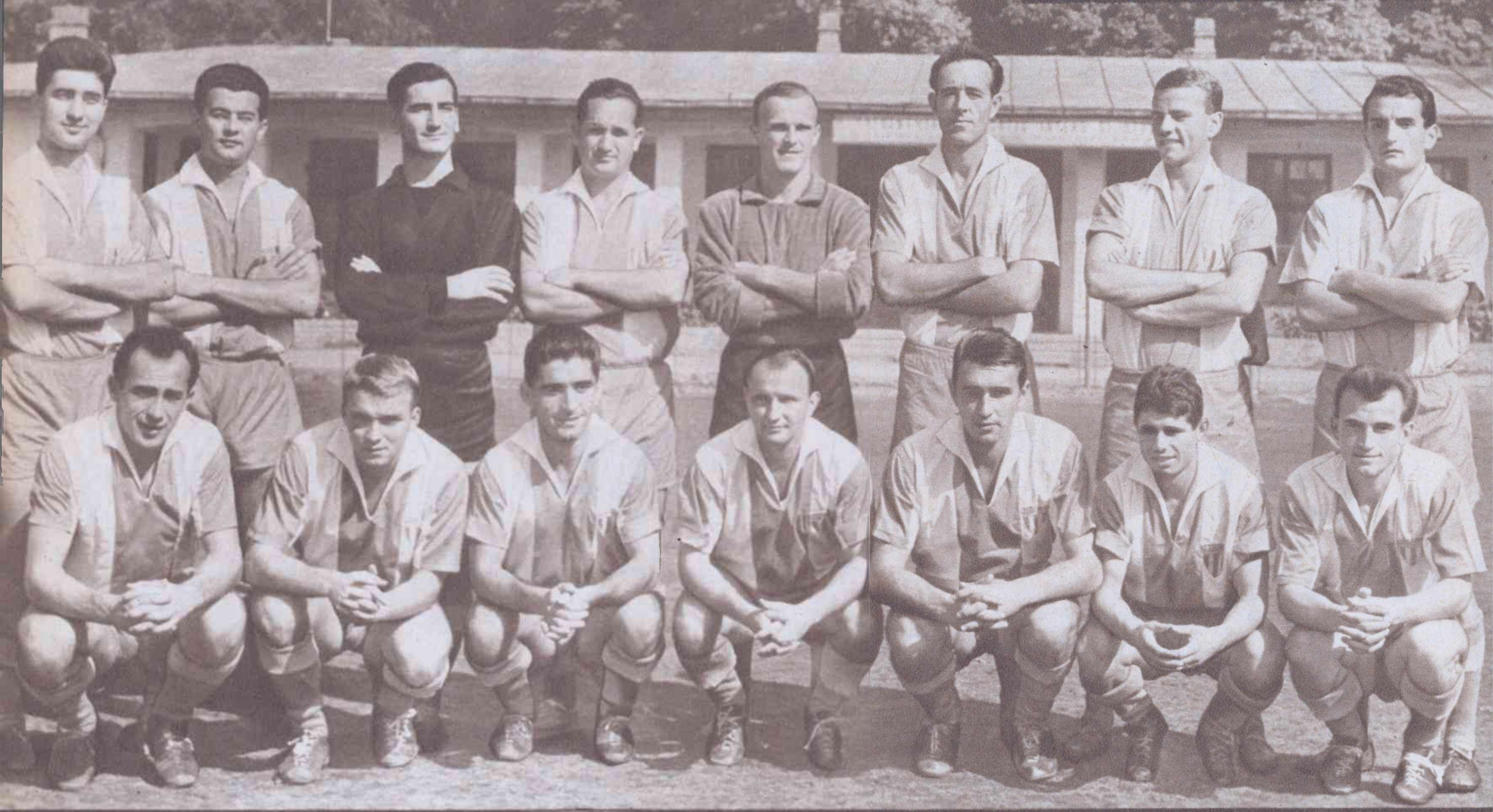
Mateianu (front row, second from left) with Progresul București in 1963.

In 1958, he joined Știința Cluj for three and a half seasons, during which he scored 21 goals in 72 Divizia A appearances, and also graduated the Faculty of Law. Then he joined Steaua București where under coach Gheorghe Popescu he won the 1961–62 Cupa României, opening the score in the 5–1 victory in the final against Rapid București.

In the middle of the 1962–63 season, he returned to Progresul București where he spent eight seasons. During his stay at The Bankers, the team was relegated twice to Divizia B, but Mateianu stayed with the club each time, helping it get promoted back to the first division. On 15 June 1969 he made his last Divizia A appearance in Progresul's 1–0 away loss to Farul Constanța, totaling 220 matches played with 62 goals in the competition. Subsequently, he was allowed by the communist authorities to play in West Germany at TUS Wannsee Berlin and Alemannia Aachen where he ended his playing career.

== International career ==
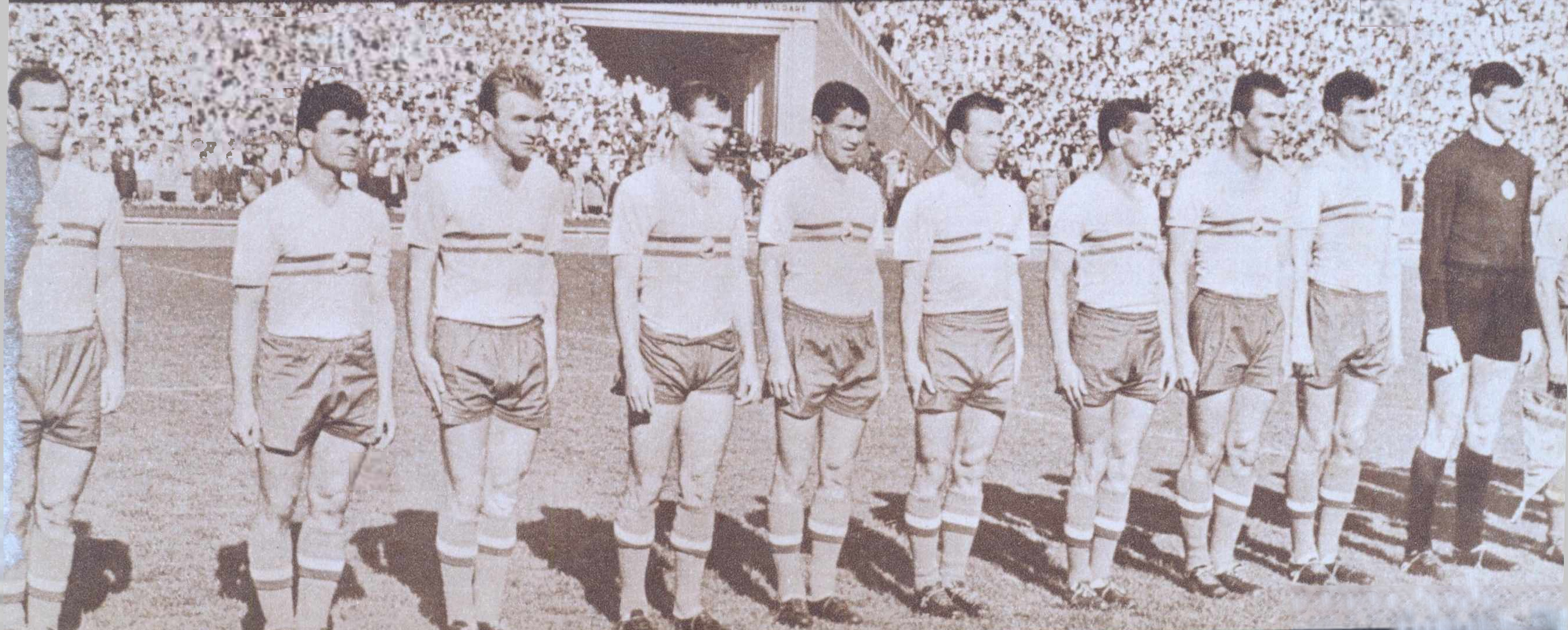
Mateianu (third from left) in the 1966 World Cup qualifiers match against Czechoslovakia, in which he scored the winning goal.

Between 1957 and 1961, Mateianu made several appearances for Romania's under-23 and B teams.

He played six games and scored two goals for Romania, making his debut under coach Augustin Botescu in the 1960 European Nations' Cup quarter-finals where they were defeated by Czechoslovakia, who advanced to the final tournament. Mateianu played three games and scored two goals in wins over Turkey and Czechoslovakia during the 1966 World Cup qualifiers. He made his last appearance for the national team in a friendly that ended with a 2–0 loss against East Germany.

== Managerial career ==
"The fact that Mateianu, with his new methods, anticipated many changes that would appear in football says a lot about how valuable he was."

— Mircea Lucescu

In 1973, just a few months after returning from West Germany where he graduated from a coaching course, Mateianu was given the role of head coach at his former club, Progresul București, then playing in Divizia B. He helped them get promoted back to Divizia A in the 1975–76 season, being dismissed in the beginning of the following season.

He went to coach Divizia B team Baia Mare in 1976 and with a team he formed mostly with local players from Maramureș County, Mateianu earned promotion in Divizia A, where the team finished twice in fourth place. During his period spent at Baia Mare, Mateianu became known for his coaching innovations, having many tactical schemes to which he gave names like Morișca ("The Hand-Mill") in which the strikers and midfielders swap places during the game, being considered an early form of tiki-taka. Other examples include Momeala mare ("The Big bait"), Momeala mică ("The Little bait"), Căciula ("The Hat"), Paralelogramul ("The Parallelogram"), Americana ("The American"), Fundul de sac ("The bottom of the bag") or Șarpele ("The Snake"). He also believed that the best football practice was to play football. That is why, unlike other clubs that organized long training camps and mountain training sessions during season breaks, he had his team play many friendly games. Mircea Lucescu was very impressed by Mateianu's working methods. He came to study his training sessions, sometimes asking Mateianu to extend the sessions to observe more of his methods. He would also go to his home where they would talk all night about football and draw tactical game schemes together.

However, after he left Baia Mare, Mateianu's career suffered a downfall, experiencing an unsuccessful second spell at Progresul București, and two stints at Divizia B team Dacia Unirea Brăila where he failed on both occasions to get promoted to the first league. Subsequently, he earned a modest 12th place in the 1982–83 Divizia A season with Petrolul Ploiești and suffered a relegation to Divizia B with Jiul Petroșani.

In 1988, Mateianu's last coaching stint was with Bihor Oradea. That September, during a controversial match against Steaua București, club officials instructed him to lose, but he declined. Bihor held a 2–1 halftime lead, yet Steaua ultimately won 3–2 after scoring twice in the second half. The decisive goal came in extra time, leading to widespread belief that the referee had intentionally prolonged the game by an uncommon six minutes to aid Steaua. In November 1988, Mateianu suffered a stroke after which he retired from coaching, many people believing that the stress caused by the game against Steaua was the cause of it. However, his wife Mihaela dismissed that idea, claiming that Mateianu had previously suffered a minor stroke in 1983. He suffered another stroke in 1994 after which he was unable to move, staying at home until his death on 25 November 1997. On 25 September 2009, he posthumously received the Honorary Citizen of Baia Mare title, and also the town's stadium is named after him. Mateianu has a total of 176 matches as a manager in the Romanian top-division, Divizia A, consisting of 70 victories, 25 draws and 81 losses.

== Playing statistics ==
Scores and results list Romania's goal tally first, score column indicates score after each Mateianu goal.

Goal	Date	Venue	Opponent	Score	Result	Competition
1	2 May 1965	23 August Stadium, Bucharest, Romania	Turkey	2–0	3–0	1966 World Cup qualifiers
2	30 May 1965	23 August Stadium, Bucharest, Romania	Czechoslovakia	1–0	1–0	1966 World Cup qualifiers

== Honours ==
=== Player ===
Progresul București

- Divizia B: 1965–66, 1969–70

Steaua București

- Cupa României: 1961–62

=== Manager ===
Progresul București

- Divizia B: 1975–76

Baia Mare

- Divizia B: 1977–78
