= Andrei Boroștean =

Romanian footballer

Andrei Boroştean
Personal information
- Full name: Andrei Ionuț Boroştean
- Date of birth: 25 February 1987 (age 39)
- Place of birth: Cluj-Napoca, Romania
- Height: 1.79 m (5 ft 10 1/2 in)
- Position: Midfielder

Senior career*
Years	Team	Apps	(Gls)
2002–2010	CFR Cluj	3	(0)
2004	→ Unirea Dej (loan)	2	(0)
2005–2008	→ Unirea Dej (loan)	21	(0)
2008–2009	→ Botoşani (loan)	22	(3)
2010–2011	Săgeata Năvodari	29	(1)
2011–2012	Arieşul Turda	11	(0)
2012	FC Hunedoara	?	(?)
2013	Seso Câmpia Turzii	?	(?)
Total		88+	(4+)
- * Club domestic league appearances and goals as of 27 February 2018

Andrei Ionuț Boroştean (born 25 February 1987) is a Romanian former footballer who played as a midfielder for CFR Cluj, Unirea Dej, FC Botoşani, Săgeata Năvodari, Arieşul Turda, FC Hunedoara and Seso Câmpia Turzii.
