= CS Speranța Jucu =

Romanian football club

Speranța Jucu
- Full name: Club Sportiv Speranța Jucu
- Nicknames: Jucanii (The Jucu People)
- Short name: Jucu
- Founded: 1974; 52 years ago as Unirea Jucu; 2017; 9 years ago as Speranța Jucu
- Ground: Unirea
- Capacity: 800
- Owner: Jucu Commune
- Chairman: Adrian Popescu
- Manager: Laur Aștilean
- League: Liga V
- 2025–26: Liga V, Cluj County, 2nd
Home colours	Away colours

Club Sportiv Speranța Jucu, commonly known as Speranța Jucu, is a Romanian football club based in Jucu, Cluj County, currently playing in the Liga IV – Cluj County, the fourth tier of the Romanian football league system.

The club was originally founded in 1974, under the name of Unirea Jucu, and for most of its existence played at amateur level, until 2013, when "jucanii" promoted to Liga III. The football club of Jucu played at the level of third tier between 2013 and 2017, when it was dissolved and then re-established in the fifth tier, under the name of Speranța Jucu.

== History ==
Former logo, as Unirea Jucu.

=== Amateur leagues ===
Speranța Jucu was founded in 1974, under the name of Unirea Jucu, and played for 39 years at amateur level, Liga IV and Liga V.

In the 2012–13 season, Unirea promoted to Liga III, winning the Liga IV – Cluj County after finishing 1st one point ahead of the second place CFR Cluj II and the promotion play-off against the Liga IV – Satu Mare County champion, Someșul Cărășeu, with 1–0, goal scored by Mănășturean, on neutral ground at the Măgura Stadium in Șimleu Silvaniei. The squad included following players: Andrei Ursu – Daniel Moldovan, Tudor Oprean, C.Grigoroșcuță, Ștefan Contraș, Ciprian Suciu, George Cotuț, V. Sântejudean, Vlad Mănășturean, D. Pop, Cristian Loghin. Substitutes: Zsolt Torkos, R.Moț, Horațiu Popa, Paul Mocan, A. Anca.

=== Liga III ===
In their first three Liga III seasons they finished on 8th (2013–14), 7th (2014–15) and 4th place (2015–16). In the summer of 2016 the club almost withdrew from Liga III after Jucu Municipality withdrew some funding, but a new investor bought the club and set an ambitious target, promotion to Liga II finishing 4th at the end of 2016–17 season. In the summer of 2017, the club was dissolved due to financial problems, but re-founded in the same period as Speranța Jucu and enrolled in the fifth tier.

== Honours ==
Liga IV – Cluj County

- Winners (1): 2012–13

== Former managers ==
- (Romania) Alpár Mészáros (2016–2017)
- (Romania) Adrian Iencsi (2017)
