= FC Maramureș Universitar Baia Mare =

FCMU Baia Mare
- Full name: Fotbal Club Maramureș Universitar Baia Mare
- Nicknames: Băimărenii (The People from Baia Mare); Maramureșenii (The People from Maramureș)
- Short name: FC Maramureș
- Founded: 2010
- Dissolved: 2013
- Ground: Viorel Mateianu
- Capacity: 15,500
Home colours	Away colours

Fotbal Club Maramureș Universitar Baia Mare, commonly known as FCMU Baia Mare or FC Maramureș, was a Romanian football club based in Baia Mare, Maramureș County, founded in 2010 and dissolved in 2013.

== History ==
The club was founded in 2010 to continue the football tradition in Baia Mare following the dissolution of FC Baia Mare. Shortly afterwards, it entered Liga Liga III by taking the place of Someșul Ileanda, newly promoted from Liga IV Sălaj County, allowing the new entity to compete nationally without inheriting the debts of the former club. Alongside president Dan Hotico, several former shareholders joined the project, ensuring continuity for local football.

In the 2010–11 season, FC Maramureș began under Ciprian Danciu and his assistant Cristian China with the squad that included Bota, Lovasz, Moțoc, Duruș, Șomcherechi, Toma, Loi, Moldovan, Gherman, Lauruc, Mălinătescu, Negrea, Iatu, Bichiri, Ernszt, Pop, Chiorean, Crăciun, Achim, M. Feraru, Brata, Răzmeriță, Ignat, Szentlaszloi, and Bumba. In October 2010, Romulus Buia, with Ciprian Dorobanțu as assistant, replaced Danciu. Ahead of the winter break, Mircea Bolba joined as technical director, was replaced in March by Dionisiu Bumb, and the squad was reinforced with Roszel, Podină, and Mureșan, helping the team win Series VI and secure promotion to Liga II.

In the 2011–12 Liga II campaign, it competed in Series II under Romulus Buia, with Ciprian Dorobanțu as assistant, while Ioan Tătăran briefly served as technical director before being dismissed. The squad was strengthened at the start and during the season with players including Filip, Roman, Buliga, Fritea, Gego, Tănasă, De Rosa, and Sidney Faye. FC Maramureș Universitar finished 11th, achieving its objective of remaining in the second tier.

== Honours ==
Liga III:

- Winners (1): 2010–11

== Former managers ==
- (Romania) Ciprian Danciu (2010)
- (Romania) Romulus Buia (2010–2012)
- (Romania) Ioan Tătăran (2012–2013)
