= Lucian Bălan =

Romanian footballer (1959–2015)

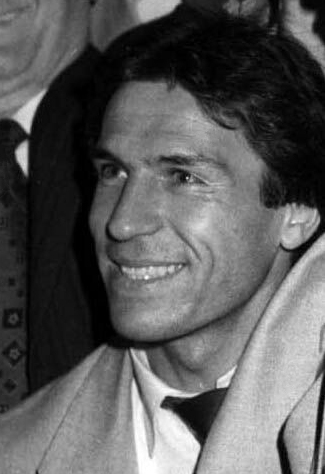
- Bălan in 1986

Personal information
- Date of birth: 25 June 1959
- Place of birth: Bucharest, Romania
- Date of death: 12 November 2015 (aged 56)
- Place of death: Baia Mare, Romania
- Height: 1.68 m (5 ft 6 in)
- Position: Midfielder

Youth career
- 1970–1973: Autobuzul București
- 1973–1976: High School No. 1 București
- 1976–1978: Minerul Cavnic

Senior career*
Years	Team	Apps	(Gls)
1978–1985	FC Baia Mare (Note: The statistics for the 1981–82 Divizia B season are unavailable.)	164	(17)
1985–1989	Steaua București	87	(5)
1989	Beerschot Antwerp	11	(1)
1990	Real Murcia	17	(0)
1990–1991	Steaua București	15	(0)
Total		294	(23)

International career
1987	Romania	1	(0)

Managerial career
- 1993–1994: Phoenix Baia Mare
- 1994: FC Baia Mare
- * Club domestic league appearances and goals

Lucian Bălan (25 June 1959 – 12 November 2015) was a Romanian football player and coach, winner of the European Cup and the European Supercup in 1986 with Steaua București and former coach at a football school in Baia Mare.

== Career ==
Bălan played one friendly game at international level for Romania, making his appearance on 8 April 1987 when coach Emerich Jenei sent him on the field at half-time to replace Gavril Balint in a 3–2 home victory against Israel.

On 25 March 2008, he was decorated by the president of Romania, Traian Băsescu for the winning of the UEFA Champions League with Ordinul "Meritul Sportiv" – (The Order "The Sportive Merit") class II.

Bălan died by suicide on 12 November 2015.

== Honours ==
FC Baia Mare

- Divizia B: 1981–82

Steaua București

- Divizia A: 1985–86, 1986–87, 1987–88, 1988–89
- Romanian Cup: 1986–87, 1988–89
- European Cup: 1985–86
- UEFA Super Cup: 1986
