= CS Minerul 1947 Ocna Dej =

Romanian football club

Minerul 1947 Ocna Dej
- Full name: Club Sportiv Minerul 1947; Ocna Dej
- Nickname(s): Minerii (The Miners)
- Founded: 1947; 2022 (refounded)
- Dissolved: 2024
- Ground: Vad
- Capacity: 650
- 2023–24: Liga III, Seria X, 10th (withdrew)
| Home colours | Away colours |

Club Sportiv Minerul 1947 Ocna Dej, commonly known as Minerul Ocna Dej, formerly known as Someșul Dej, was a Romanian football club based in Ocna Dejului, Cluj County, which at its best competed in the Liga III.

== History ==
The club was founded in 1947 as Minerul Ocna Dej by the workers of the mining exploitation Salina Ocna Dej and played most of its history in the fifth tier and more than thirty-five seasons in the fourth league.

Minerul promoted for the first time to third division winning the Divizia D – Cluj County at the end of the 1998–99 season, but after was ranked 11th in the 1999–2000 season “The Miners” relegated after finished in 15th-place in the next season.

For miners followed more than twenty seasons in the fourth and fifth division. In 2016, the club was taken over by the local businessman Vicențiu Știr who founded in 2017 another club, ACS Vicențiu Dej.

Vicențiu Dej promoted to 4th league after was finished 2nd in the Dej Zone of the 2017–18 season of the Liga V – Cluj County and was renamed as Someșul Dej before the next season.

After the 2019–20 season was suspended in March 2020, due to the COVID-19 pandemic in Romania, Someșul won the Liga IV – Cluj County championship play-off in the 90th minute against Victoria Cluj and, despite finished last in the promotion group, the team led by Gheorghe Barbu promoted to Liga III benefiting from the withdraw of Voința Budeasa.

In the first season in Liga III, Someșul, with Alpár Mészáros as head coach, who replaced Mircea Bolba after five rounds, finished in 7th place in the Series X, 6 points ahead of CSM Satu Mare and Progresul Șomcuta Mare, thus avoiding relegation in the fourth league.

Someșul began the 2021–22 season with Dănuț Șomcherechi on the bench, but the former defender from FC Argeș or Oțelul Galați in the early 2000s was sacked after qualifying the team for the Series X play-off and replaced with Tiberiu Bălan, that led the club to obtained the highest league finish as ranked 4th in the Series X play-off.

Someșul merged in the summer of 2022, with the other club financially sustained by Vicențiu Știr, Minerul Ocna Dej, to form Minerul 1947 Ocna Dej.

== Ground ==
The Miners played its home matches at the Vad Sport Base, based in Vad, which holds 650 seats and having natural grass.

== Honours ==
Liga IV – Cluj County

- Winners (2): 1998–99, 2019-20
- Runners-up (1): 2018–19

Liga V – Cluj County

- Winners (1): 2017–18

== League history ==
| Season | Tier | Division | Place | Notes | Cupa României |
|---|---|---|---|---|---|
| 2023–24 | 3 | Liga III (Seria X) | 10th | Withdrew | |
| 2022–23 | 3 | Liga III (Seria X) | 6th | | |
| 2021–22 | 3 | Liga III (Seria X) | 4th | | |

| Season | Tier | Division | Place | Notes | Cupa României |
|---|---|---|---|---|---|
| 2020–21 | 3 | Liga III (Seria X) | 7th | | |
| 2019–20 | 4 | Liga IV (CJ) | 1st (C) | Promoted | |
| 2018–19 | 4 | Liga IV (CJ) | 2nd | | |

== Notable former players ==
The footballers mentioned below have played at least 1 season for Minerul and also played in Liga I for another team.

- (Romania) Sergiu Costin
- (Romania) Sergiu Negruț
- (Romania) Mihai Onicaș

== Former managers ==
- (Romania) Mircea Bolba (2018–2019)
- (Romania) Gheorghe Barbu (2020)
- (Romania) Mircea Bolba (2020)
- (Romania) Alpár Mészáros (2020–2021)
- (Romania) Dănuț Șomcherechi (2021–2022)
- (Romania) Tiberiu Bălan (2022–2023)
- (Romania) Dănuț Șomcherechi (2023)
- (Romania) Dan Mugurel (2024–)
