= FC Unirea Dej =

Romanian football club

Unirea Dej
- Full name: Fotbal Club Unirea Dej
- Nicknames: Uniriștii; Alb-Albaștrii (The White and Blues)
- Short name: Unirea Dej
- Founded: 1921; 105 years ago
- Ground: Unirea
- Capacity: 6.000
- Owner: Dej Municipality
- Chairman: Adrian Gavriș
- Head coach: Alexandru Bourceanu
- League: Liga III
- 2025–26: Liga III, Seria VIII, 10th
- Website: https://unireadej.ro/
Home colours	Away colours

Fotbal Club Unirea Dej, commonly known as Unirea Dej, is a Romanian professional football club based in Dej, Cluj County, that competes in the Liga III, the third tier of the Romanian football.

It is one of Romania's oldest football teams, founded in 1921, although it never reached the Liga I. Unirea's home field, Stadionul Unirea, has 5,000 seats. In 2004 Unirea Dej became the reserve team of CFR Cluj, until the summer of 2007. It has an average attendance of about 300 fans.

== History ==
Unirea Dej was founded in 1921. For more than four decades, the club competed in regional and district championships. In the 1961–62 season, under the guidance of Victor Hușa, Unirea won the Cluj Regional Championship and finished 2nd in Series III of the six-team promotion play-off tournament held in Mediaș, behind AS Cugir, thus earning promotion to Divizia B for the first time in its history.

Renamed Steaua Dej before the start of the second half of the season, the team, coached by Gheorghe Tomescu, finished the 1962–63 season in 13th place in Series III and was relegated to the re-established Divizia C.

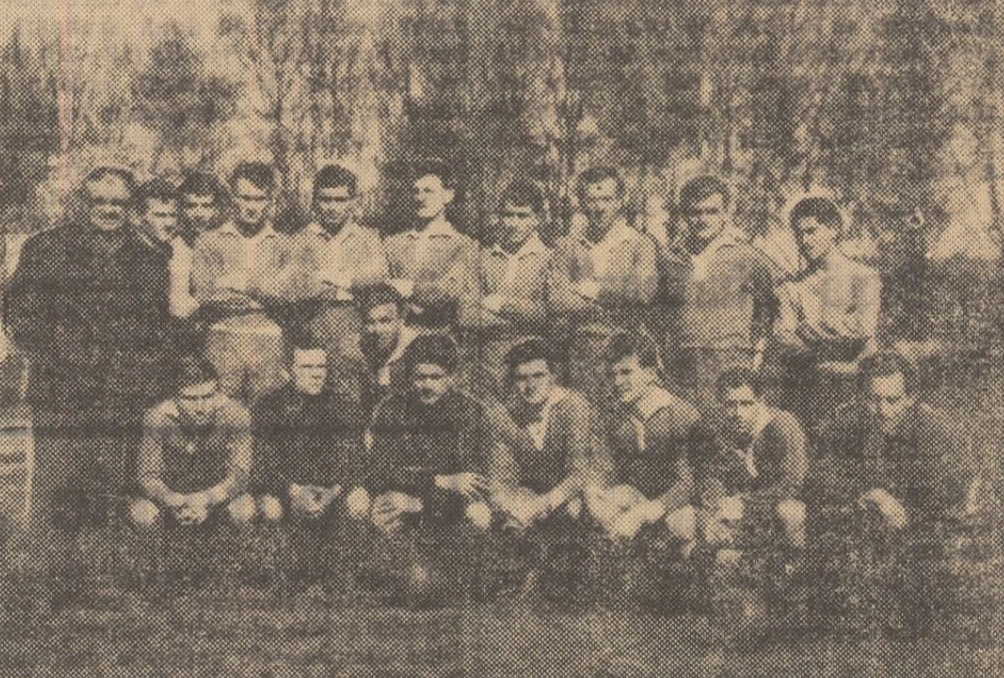
Unirea Dej squad in 1966

In the third division, the club reverted to the Unirea name and competed in the North Series, finishing 4th in 1963–64 and 9th in 1964–65, under coach Victor Hușa. In the 1965–66 season, Unirea won the series and earned promotion back to Divizia B under the guidance of Eutin Stepan. The squad included Mihai Măglaș, Mihai Silveșan, Francisc Boldiș, Emeric Farcaș, Gavril Butuza, Vasile Negrea, Mircea Gherman, Emil Drăgoi, Mihai Cristof, Alexandru Mardan, Francisc Maghiari, Geza Bandi, Victor Servațius, Ioan Curtu, Iosif Safar, Constantin Neagu and Iuliu Duca.

The team coached by Victor Hușa remained in the second division for only one season, finishing last in Series II and being relegated back to Divizia C.

The following season brought a 9th-place finish in the North Series, followed by 3rd place in Series VII in 1968–69 and 7th in the 1969–70 campaign.

In 1970–71, Unirea finished as runners-up, level on points with Arieșul Turda, but missed promotion on goal difference. In the same season, the club also reached the Round of 32 of the Cupa României, losing 0–2 to Universitatea Cluj. The team fielded by Vasile Vereș for the match consisted of Pugna — Covaciu, Racolța, Gall, Mikloș, Al. Mardan, Albert, Zavalschi (Nicoară, 46'), Iosif Pop, Dorin Pop and Constantin Catană.

Moved to Series XI, Unirea finished 7th in the 1971–72 season, followed by a 3rd-place finish in Series IX in 1972–73. Another runners-up finish followed in 1973–74, only one point behind Metalul Aiud.

The White and Blues continued to challenge for promotion with consecutive 2nd-place finishes in Series XI in 1974–75 and Series X in 1975–76, before finishing 4th in 1976–77, 7th in 1977–78 and 10th in Series IX in 1978–79.

The 1979–80 season brought a 7th-place finish in Series IX. Unirea also reached the Round of 32 of the 1979–80 Cupa României, where it lost 1–4 to top-flight side SC Bacău. Another runners-up finish followed in 1980–81. However, the 1981–82 campaign ended in disappointment, with the club unexpectedly finishing last in Series XI and being relegated to the fourth division.

Unirea Dej quickly returned to the third tier after winning the 1982–83 Cluj County Championship and defeating Heniu Prundu Bârgăului, the Bistrița-Năsăud County champions, 5–1 on aggregate in the promotion play-off, winning 5–0 at home and losing 0–1 away. However, its return to Divizia C was short-lived, as the team from the Someș River finished last in Series X of the 1983–84 season and was relegated once again.

In the 1988–89 season, after five years at county level, Unirea again won the Cluj County title and secured promotion by defeating Silvania Cehu Silvaniei, the Sălaj County champions, 4–2 on aggregate, following a 2–2 away draw and a 2–0 home victory.

During the following decades, Unirea became predominantly associated with the third tier, while also experiencing periods in the second and fourth divisions. The club remained an important part of football in Dej, although it generally competed outside the national spotlight.

In September 2008, the club announced a collaboration with AC Milan centred on youth development. Under the proposed partnership, Unirea became associated with the Italian club and intended to develop young players according to Milan's academy model. Eusebiu Șuvagău remained head coach until the summer of 2010, when he was replaced by Constantin Olariu. Olariu left in October 2010 and was succeeded by Ioan Tătăran. When Tătăran became technical director of FC Maramureș Universitar Baia Mare in July 2011, Șuvagău returned as head coach.

=== Centenary promotion and return to Liga II (2020–2024) ===
In the 2020–21 season, Unirea Dej finished 2nd in Series IX of Liga III and qualified for the promotion play-offs. In the first round, Unirea eliminated Minaur Baia Mare after a 0–0 away draw and a 3–1 home victory.

In the final promotion round, the club faced SCM Zalău. The first leg in Dej ended 0–0, while the return match in Zalău finished 1–1 after Unirea scored a dramatic equaliser in the closing moments. The away-goals rule sent the club back to Liga II after fourteen years, with the promotion coming in the year of Unirea's centenary.

Under head coach Dragoș Militaru, Unirea adapted well to the second tier. The club finished 9th in the regular season of the 2021–22 Liga II season. In the play-out, the White and Blues recorded five victories and only one defeat, finishing 2nd in their group and comfortably retaining their Liga II status.

The 2022–23 season became the club's strongest modern campaign. Unirea qualified for the six-team promotion play-off alongside Politehnica Iași, Steaua București, Oțelul Galați, Dinamo București and Gloria Buzău.

Although the team was unable to remain in the promotion places, Unirea recorded several notable results during the play-off, including a 1–0 home victory over Gloria Buzău and draws against Politehnica Iași, Steaua București and Dinamo București. Unirea eventually finished the season in 6th place, its highest position in the Romanian league system in the club's modern history.

The following 2023–24 season brought a sharp decline. Unirea failed to qualify for the promotion play-off and entered the relegation play-out. The club remained in danger until the final round and, despite defeating CSM Alexandria 1–0 in its last match, was relegated after CSC Dumbrăvița drew 1–1 with Ceahlăul Piatra Neamț. Unirea thus finished as the fourth team relegated from Liga II and returned to Liga III after three consecutive seasons in the second tier.

=== Return to Liga III and relegation (2024–2026) ===
Following relegation from Liga II, Unirea entered the 2024–25 Liga III season. The club failed to qualify for the promotion play-off and instead competed in the relegation play-out, where it secured its place in the third tier for another season.

Unirea continued in Liga III in 2025–26, but endured another difficult campaign. After finishing the regular season near the bottom of its series, the club entered the relegation play-out and was ultimately relegated to Liga IV at the end of the season, only two years after dropping out of Liga II.

As of August 2026, Unirea Dej's competitive status for the 2026–27 season had not yet been officially confirmed. The Cluj County Football Association set 21 August 2026 as the registration deadline for the county's Liga IV championship, while also allowing clubs not admitted to competitions organised by the Romanian Football Federation to apply after that date. At that stage, no official announcement had confirmed whether Unirea would compete in Liga IV or would be retained in Liga III following the finalisation of the third-tier composition.

== Honours ==
Liga III

- Winners (3): 1965–66, 1993–94, 2003–04
- Runners-up (7): 1970–71, 1973–74, 1974–75, 1975–76, 1980–81, 1991–92, 2020–21

Liga IV – Cluj County

- Winners (2): 1982–83, 1988–89

Cluj Regional Championship

- Winners (1): 1961–62

== Players ==
=== First team squad ===
As of 10 September 2024

Note: Flags indicate national team as defined under FIFA eligibility rules; some limited exceptions apply. Players may hold more than one non-FIFA nationality.

No.	Pos.	Nation	Player
1	GK	ROU	Rareș Pop
3	DF	ROU	Dominik Șoptirean (on loan from CFR Cluj)
4	DF	ROU	Daniel Anchidin
5	MF	ROU	Darius Șuteu
6	DF	ROU	Antonio Dobrin
8	MF	ROU	Vlad Moraru (on loan from U Cluj)
10	FW	ROU	Andrei Pop
11	MF	ROU	Adrian Măr
12	GK	ROU	Roland Csapó
14	MF	ROU	Tiago Mureșan (on loan from U Cluj)
15	MF	ROU	Vlasti Martinovic (Captain)

No.	Pos.	Nation	Player
17	FW	ROU	Marcus Georgiu
18	MF	ROU	Bogdan Popovici (on loan from Farul)
19	MF	ROU	Darius Mureșan
20	MF	ROU	Alexandru Zanc
21	DF	ROU	Iustin Neacșu (on loan from U Cluj)
22	DF	ROU	Rareș Uțiu (on loan from U Cluj)
23	DF	ROU	George Bălan
25	MF	ROU	Marius Ciobanu
28	GK	ROU	Eusebiu Urian
30	MF	ROU	Denis Calo
77	MF	ROU	Ciprian Călugăr (on loan from U Cluj)

=== Out on loan ===
Note: Flags indicate national team as defined under FIFA eligibility rules; some limited exceptions apply. Players may hold more than one non-FIFA nationality.

No. / Pos. / Nation / Player	No. / Pos. / Nation / Player

== Club Officials ==
=== Board of directors ===
Role	Name
Owner	(Romania) Dej Municipality
President	(Romania) Adrian Gavriș
Sporting director	(Romania) Iosif Martonoș
Head of Youth Development	(Romania) Ovidiu Fărcaş
Delegate	(Romania) Adrian Bud
Press Officer	(Romania) George Matei

=== Current technical staff ===
Role	Name
Manager	(Romania) Alexandru Bourceanu
Assistant coach	(Romania) Eusebio Șuvagău
Goalkeeping coach	vacant
Club doctor	(Romania) Mihai Alexandru
Kinetotherapist	(Romania) Răzvan Bonțidean

== Notable former players ==
The footballers enlisted below have had international cap(s) for their respective countries at junior and/or senior level and/or significant caps for FC Unirea Dej.

Romania

- (Romania) Gheorghe Albu
- (Romania) Laur Aștilean
- (Romania) Teodor Balmoș
- (Romania) Costel Bădan
- (Romania) Andrei Boroștean
- (Romania) Sandu Borș
- (Romania) Alin Burdeț
- (Romania) Ionuț Cazan
- (Romania) Ovidiu Ceclan
- (Romania) Octavian Chihaia
- (Romania) Cătălin Ciucur
- (Romania) Angelo Cocian
- (Romania) Sorin Corpodean
- (Romania) Sergiu Costin
- (Romania) Constantin Cremenițchi
- (Romania) Vasile Curileac
- (Romania) Ciprian Deac
- (Romania) Ioan Deac
- (Romania) Adrian Dulcea
- (Romania) Andrei Estinca
- (Romania) Adrian Falub
- (Romania) Alexandru Gego
- (Romania) Sabin Goia
- (Romania) Marius Grad
- (Romania) Emil Haitonic
- (Romania) Dumitru Halostă
- (Romania) Cristian Ivan
- (Romania) Cristian Lupuț
- (Romania) Dumitru Mitu
- (Romania) Aurel Nalați
- (Romania) Onișor Nicorec
- (Romania) Constantin Olariu
- (Romania) Paul Papp
- (Romania) Daniel Sabou
- (Romania) Viorel Sântejudean
- (Romania) Marius Suller
- (Romania) Emil Ștef
- (Romania) Eusebiu Șuvagău
- (Romania) Vladimir Tamaș
- (Romania) Dorin Toma
- (Romania) Cosmin Văsîie
- (Romania) Eugen Voica
- (Romania) Călin Zanc
- (Romania) Tiberiu Zelencz

Moldova

- (Moldova) Dorian Railean

== Notable former managers ==
- (Romania) Nicolae Manea (1992–1996)
- (Romania) George Ciorceri (2006)
- (Romania) Mircea Bolba (2008–2009)
- (Romania) Cristian Fedor (2007–2010)
- (Romania) Constantin Olariu (2010)
- (Romania) Ioan Tătăran (2010–2011)
- (Romania) Mircea Bolba (2011–2012)
- (Romania) Alin Minteuan (2012–2013)
- (Romania) Valentin Sinescu (2015)
- (Romania) Alpár Mészáros (2015–2016)
- (Romania) Gheorghe Barbu (2016)
- (Romania) Alpár Mészáros (2017)
- (Romania) Gheorghe Barbu (2017)
- (Romania) Mircea Bolba (2018)
- (Romania) Gheorghe Barbu (2018–2019)

== League history ==
Season	Tier	Division	Place	Notes	Cupa României
2026–27	3	Liga III	TBD		First Round
2025–26	3	Liga III	10th	Spared	
2024–25	3	Liga III	8th		
2023–24	2	Liga II	18th (R)	Relegated	Play-off round
2022–23	2	Liga II	6th		Third round
2021–22	2	Liga II	9th		
2020–21	3	Liga III (Seria IX)	2nd (P)	Promoted	
2019–20	3	Liga III (Seria V)	10th		
2018–19	3	Liga III (Seria V)	11th		
2017–18	3	Liga III (Seria V)	14th		
2016–17	3	Liga III (Seria V)	9th		
2015–16	3	Liga III (Seria V)	10th		
2014–15	3	Liga III (Seria V)	14th		
2013–14	3	Liga III (Seria V)	11th		
2012–13	3	Liga III (Seria V)	5th		
2011–12	3	Liga III (Seria VI)	12th		
2010–11	3	Liga III (Seria VI)	12th		
2009–10	3	Liga III (Seria VI)	9th		
2008–09	3	Liga III (Seria VI)	15th		

Season	Tier	Division	Place	Notes	Cupa României
2007–08	3	Liga III (Seria VI)	8th		
2006–07	2	Liga II (Seria II)	17th (R)	Relegated	
2005–06	2	Divizia B (Seria III)	12th		Round of 32
2004–05	2	Divizia B (Seria III)	13th		
2003–04	3	Divizia C (Seria IV)	1st (C, P)	Promoted	
2002–03	3	Divizia C (Seria VIII)	5th		
2001–02	3	Divizia C (Seria VIII)	3rd		
2000–01	3	Divizia C (Seria VIII)	6th		
1999–00	3	Divizia C (Seria VI)	14th		
1998–99	2	Divizia B (Seria II)	18th (R)	Relegated	Round of 32
1997–98	2	Divizia B (Seria II)	6th		
1996–97	2	Divizia B (Seria II)	6th		
1995–96	2	Divizia B (Seria II)	7th		
1994–95	2	Divizia B (Seria II)	9th		Round of 16
1993–94	3	Divizia C (Seria IV)	1st (C, P)	Promoted	
1992–93	3	Divizia C (Seria IV)	5th		
1991–92	3	Divizia C (Seria XI)	2nd		Round of 32
1990–91	3	Divizia C (Seria XI)	13th		
1989–90	3	Divizia C (Seria XI)	9th		
