= Jucu =

- Commune
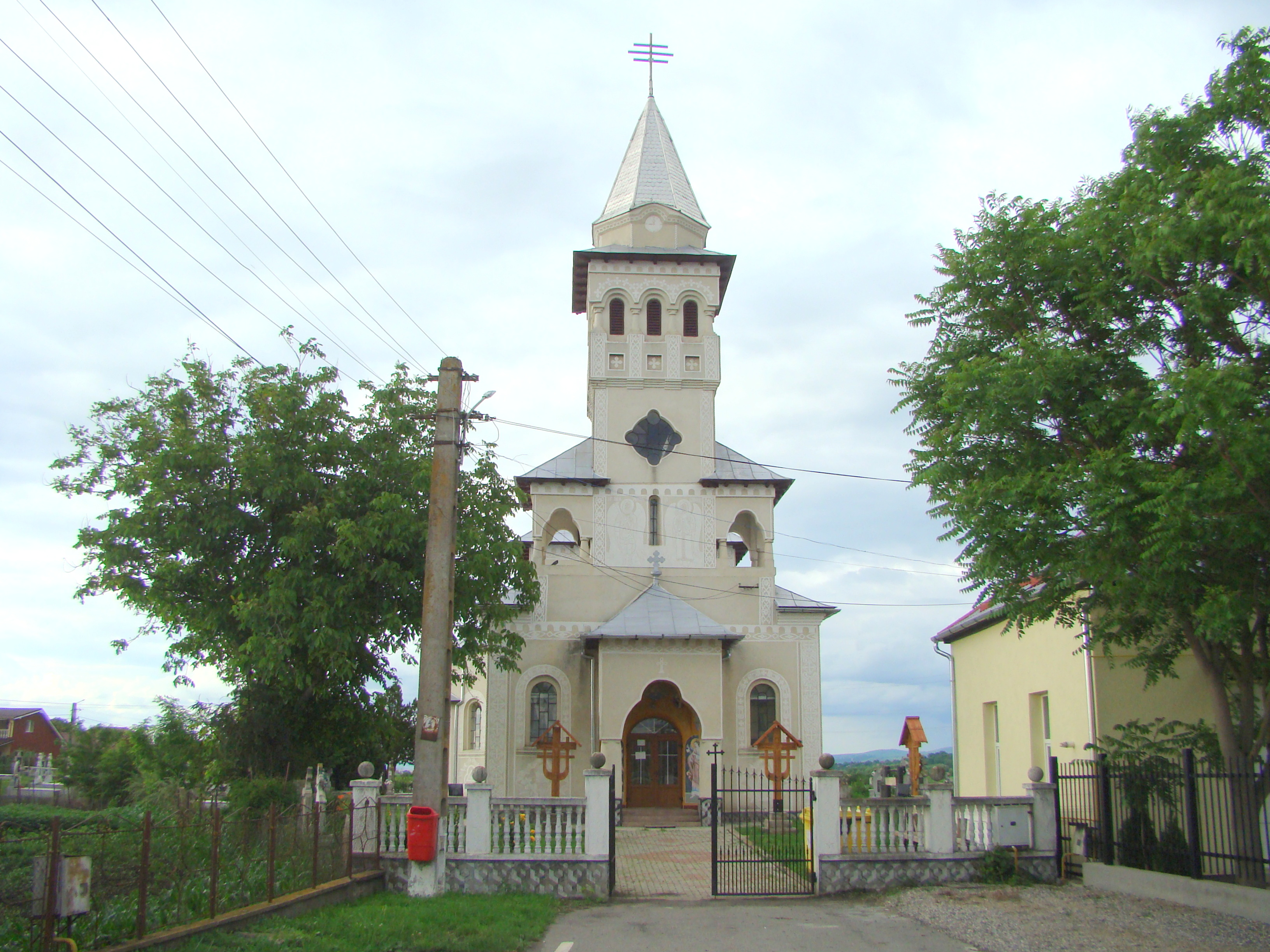
- Orthodox church in Jucu de Mijloc

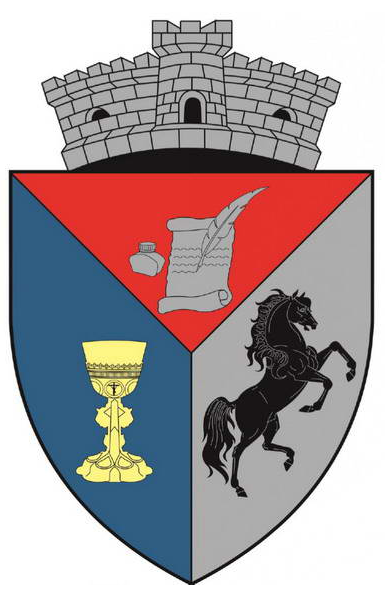
- Coat of arms

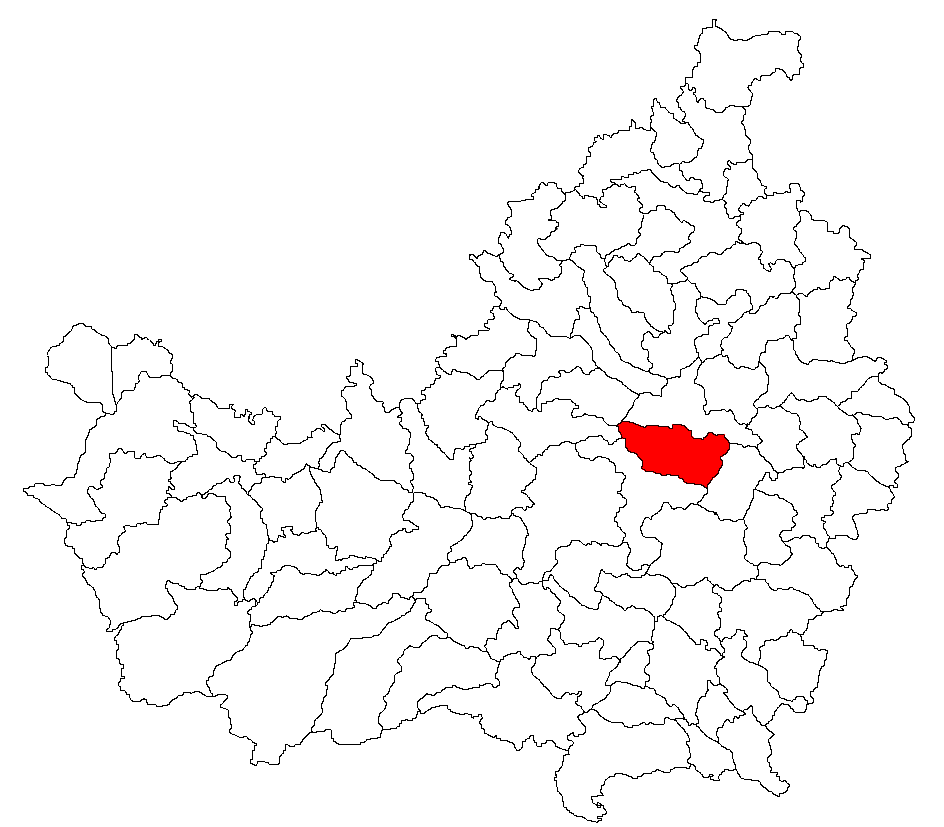
- Location in Cluj County

- Location in Romania
- Coordinates: 46°51′18″N 23°47′36″E
- Country: Romania
- County: Cluj
- Subdivisions: Gădălin, Juc-Herghelie, Jucu de Mijloc, Jucu de Sus, Vișea

Government
  - Mayor (2020–2024): Valentin-Dorel Pojar (PSD)
- Area: 85.13 km^{2} (32.87 sq mi)
- Elevation: 325 m (1,066 ft)
- Population (2021-12-01): 5,349
  - Density: 62.83/km^{2} (162.7/sq mi)
- Time zone: UTC+02:00 (EET)
  - Summer (DST): UTC+03:00 (EEST)
- Postal code: 407354
- Area code: +40 x64
- Vehicle reg.: CJ
- Website: primariajucu.ro

Jucu (Hungarian: Zsuk; German: Schucken) is a commune in Cluj County, Transylvania, Romania. It is composed of five villages: Gădălin (Kötelend), Juc-Herghelie (Zsukiménes), Jucu de Mijloc (Nemeszsuk), commune centre Jucu de Sus (Felsőzsuk), and Vișea (Visa).

== Economy ==
In 2007, Nokia started a €200 million investment in Jucu, building a cellphone factory that had 4,000 employees. It had begun production in 2008, but the factory closed in 2011.

German car components manufacturer Bosch also opened a factory in Jucu and a centre dedicated for training students in the dual educational system.

== Population ==
According to the census from 2011, there were 4,270 people living in Jucu; of this population, 84.26% were ethnic Romanians and 11.62% ethnic Hungarians. At the 2021 census, the commune had a population of 5,349; of those, 80.2% were Romanians and 8.6% Hungarians.

Census		Ethnicity
Year	Population	Romanians	Hungarians	Germans	Roma people	Other
1850	2529	2126	242	2	109	50
1880	2584	2029	437	6		112
1890	3055	2404	601	6		44
1900	3314	2608	648	29		29
1910	3799	3010	737	7		45
1920	3893	3266	575			52
1930	4382	3691	630	4	33	24
1930	4382	3649	635	4	68	26
1941	5238	4295	909	6	10	18
1956	5841	5027	773	2	33	6
1966	5452	4760	690		1	1
2002	4086	3524	516	1	43	2
2011	4270
2021	5349

== Buildings and administration ==
High-power broadcasting station: 3 masts 165 metres tall. The station broadcasts on 909 kHz with 200 kW and 1152 kHz with 950 kW.

Jucu is administered by a mayor and a local council composed of 13 councilors.

== Natives ==
- George Bariț (1812–1893), historian, philologist, playwright, politician, businessman, and journalist, the founder of the Romanian language press in Transylvania
